= 2021 Copa Paraguay =

Tournament details
- Country: Paraguay
- Dates: 27 July – 1 December 2021
- Teams: 64

Final positions
- Champions: Olimpia (1st title)
- Runners-up: Sol de América
- Third place: Libertad
- Copa Sudamericana: Sol de América

Tournament statistics
- Matches played: 64
- Goals scored: 199 (3.11 per match)

The 2021 Copa Paraguay was the third edition of the Copa Paraguay, Paraguay's domestic football cup competition. Originally known as the 2020 Copa Paraguay, the competition was scheduled to start on 14 April 2020 and conclude in late 2020, with the winners qualifying for the 2021 Copa Sudamericana as well as the 2020 Supercopa Paraguay against the Primera División champions with better record in the aggregate table.

The competition was suspended indefinitely due to the COVID-19 pandemic. On 9 July 2020, Paraguayan Football Association's Chief of Competitions Michael Sánchez stated that it would be postponed to 2021 with the same qualified teams given the unavailability of stadiums in the departments of Paraguay as well as the lack of dates to reschedule the competition in the remainder of 2020. As a result, the berth to the 2021 Copa Sudamericana was passed to the best team in the Primera División season that failed to qualify for international competition. The decision to suspend the competition was confirmed by the APF on 11 September 2020.

On 15 January 2021, the APF confirmed that the Copa Paraguay would be resumed in 2021, with this edition keeping the same format and fixture elaborated for the 2020 edition. On 15 July 2021, the APF announced that the competition would start on 27 July 2021.

Olimpia won their first Copa Paraguay title, beating Sol de América on penalties after a 2–2 draw over 90 minutes in the final. The winners qualified for the 2021 Supercopa Paraguay against the Primera División champions with better record in the aggregate table, with runners-up Sol de América qualifying for the 2022 Copa Sudamericana since Olimpia had already qualified for international competition on league performance. Libertad were the defending champions but were defeated by Olimpia in the semi-finals.

== Format ==
64 teams took part, with the competition keeping the same format used in the previous edition. The competition is played as a single-elimination tournament, with all teams directly qualifying for the first round, where they were drawn into 32 single-legged ties. Ties in all rounds will be played as a single game, with a penalty shootout deciding the winner in case of a draw.

== Teams ==
64 teams competed in this edition of the competition: the 10 Primera División and 18 División Intermedia teams, as well as 11 from the Primera B, 8 from the Primera C, and the 17 champions from each department of Paraguay representing the UFI.

=== Primera División ===
All of the 10 Primera División teams took part in the competition:

- 12 de Octubre (I)
- Cerro Porteño
- Guaireña
- Guaraní
- Libertad
- Nacional
- Olimpia
- River Plate
- Sol de América
- Sportivo Luqueño

=== División Intermedia ===
All of the 18 División Intermedia teams took part:

- 2 de Mayo
- 3 de Febrero (CDE)
- Atyrá
- Deportivo Capiatá
- Deportivo Santaní
- Fernando de la Mora
- Fulgencio Yegros
- General Caballero (JLM)
- General Díaz
- Guaraní (T)
- Independiente (CG)
- Resistencia
- Rubio Ñu
- San Lorenzo
- Sportivo Ameliano
- Sportivo Iteño
- Sportivo Trinidense
- Tacuary

=== Primera B ===
The 9 teams ranked from 2nd to 10th place in the 2019 Primera B season and the top two in the 2019 Primera C season qualified:

- 3 de Febrero (RB)
- 12 de Octubre (SD)
- 24 de Setiembre (VP)
- 29 de Setiembre
- Cristóbal Colón (JAS)
- Cristóbal Colón (Ñ)
- Olimpia (I)
- Presidente Hayes
- Recoleta
- Sportivo Limpeño
- Tembetary

=== Primera C ===
Teams ranked from 3rd to 10th place in the previous Primera C season qualified:

- Atlético Juventud
- Benjamín Aceval
- Deportivo Pinozá
- General Caballero (CG)
- Humaitá
- Oriental
- Silvio Pettirossi
- Sport Colonial

=== UFI ===
The champions from each of the 17 departments of Paraguay qualified for the competition:

- Teniente Rojas (Concepción)
- 12 de Octubre (VR) (San Pedro)
- 5 de Octubre (Cordillera)
- Karai Chivé (Guairá)
- Atlético Mil Palos (Caaguazú)
- Coronel Martínez (Caazapá)
- 22 de Setiembre (Itapúa)
- 24 de Junio (Misiones)
- Deportivo La Colmena (Paraguarí)
- Deportivo Primavera (Alto Paraná)
- Ytororó (Central)
- 1° de Marzo FBC (Ñeembucú)
- Mariscal Estigarribia (Amambay)
- Sport Pacobá (Canindeyú)
- Independiente (N) (Presidente Hayes)
- Atlético Trébol (Boquerón)
- Sport Sastreño (Alto Paraguay)

== Round of 64 ==
The draw for the round of 64 was held on 9 March 2020 and the matches were scheduled to be played from 14 April 2020 onwards. On 15 July 2021, the APF confirmed that the round of 64 games would be played from 27 July to 26 August 2021.

27 July 2021	Cristóbal Colón (Ñ) (3)	1–1 (4–2 p)	Guaraní (1)	Luque
17:00	Villalba 84' (pen.)	Report	Oviedo 73'	Stadium: Feliciano Cáceres; Referee: Sergio Melgarejo
	Penalties
	Villalba (penalty scored); Cáceres (penalty scored); Verón (penalty scored); Ruiz (penalty scored)		(penalty missed) González; (penalty scored) Villalva; (penalty missed) Colmán; (penalty scored) Oviedo

27 July 2021	3 de Febrero (RB) (3)	0–6	Sol de América (1)	Luque
19:30		Report	Viera 5', 26'; Da Costa 54'; Mencia 72'; Valle 79' (o.g.); Castro 84'	Stadium: Feliciano Cáceres; Referee: Julio Ojeda

28 July 2021	Recoleta (3)	1–2	General Caballero (JLM) (2)	Juan León Mallorquín
13:00	Espínola 82'	Report	De Souza 28', 67'	Stadium: Ka'arendy; Referee: Edgar Barrios

28 July 2021	Deportivo Primavera (4)	0–6	Olimpia (1)	Juan León Mallorquín
15:00		Report	Mendieta 2'; Camacho 41'; Peralta 44', 61'; Sosa 52' (pen.); Estigarribia 74'	Stadium: Ka'arendy; Referee: Derlis Benítez

29 July 2021	Benjamín Aceval (4)	0–2	Cerro Porteño (1)	Villa Hayes
15:00		Report	Báez 6'; Acosta 78'	Stadium: Isidro Roussillón; Referee: César Rolón

29 July 2021	Atlético Trébol (4)	0–17	Fernando de la Mora (2)	Villa Hayes
17:30		Report	Alonso 17', 45', 71', 78', 85'; Quintana 19', 24', 35'; Bareiro 47', 62'; Sanabria 48', 76'; Amarilla 65'; Araujo 67', 75', 80'; Esteche 87'	Stadium: Isidro Roussillón; Referee: Víctor Ruiz

3 August 2021	Sport Pacobá (4)	0–0 (2–3 p)	Tacuary (2)	San Estanislao
13:00		Report		Stadium: Juan José Vázquez; Referee: Ángel Brítez
	Penalties
	González (penalty scored); Rodríguez (penalty missed); Rodas (penalty scored); Caballero (penalty missed); Moral (penalty missed)		(penalty missed) Aranda; (penalty scored) Bernal; (penalty scored) Giménez; (penalty missed) Cantero; (penalty scored) Salcedo

3 August 2021	Teniente Rojas (4)	0–5	Deportivo Santaní (2)	San Estanislao
15:00		Report	Sequeira 55', 67'; A. Benítez 62' (o.g.); C. Villalba 74'; O. Villalba 80'	Stadium: Juan José Vázquez; Referee: Zulma Quiñónez

4 August 2021	Ytororó (4)	0–3	Sportivo Luqueño (1)	Luque
17:00		Report	Bazán 20' (pen.), 38'; González 41'	Stadium: Feliciano Cáceres; Referee: Jorge Ruiz Díaz

4 August 2021	29 de Setiembre (3)	0–5	Libertad (1)	Luque
19:30		Report	Melgarejo 34'; Franco 35'; Ferreira 50', 66', 90+2'	Stadium: Feliciano Cáceres; Referee: Marcos Galeano

5 August 2021	Sport Sastreño (4)	1–0	General Caballero (CG) (4)	Villa Hayes
15:00	Alarcón 62' (pen.)	Report		Stadium: Isidro Roussillón; Referee: Christian Aquino

5 August 2021	Independiente (N) (4)	0–2	3 de Febrero (CDE) (2)	Villa Hayes
17:30		Report	Caballero 51'; Garcete 90+4'	Stadium: Isidro Roussillón; Referee: Álvaro Giménez

10 August 2021	Sport Colonial (4)	1–2	Sportivo Ameliano (2)	Asunción
13:00	Alfonso 56' (o.g.)	Report	Caballero 17'; Arce 82'	Stadium: Roque Battilana; Referee: Dionicio Cristaldo

10 August 2021	Silvio Pettirossi (4)	0–3	Resistencia (2)	Asunción
15:00		Report	Benítez 38'; Ruiz Díaz 47'; Die. Martínez 90+1'	Stadium: Roque Battilana; Referee: Christian Aquino

11 August 2021	Presidente Hayes (3)	1–1 (3–1 p)	Fulgencio Yegros (2)	Villa Elisa
17:00	Núñez 8'	Report	Escobar 29'	Stadium: Luis Alfonso Giagni; Referee: Marco Franco
	Penalties
	Núñez (penalty scored); Cuesta (penalty missed); R. Ramírez (penalty missed); M. Ramírez (penalty scored); Enciso (penalty scored)		(penalty missed) Zarza; (penalty missed) Romero; (penalty missed) Curtido; (penalty scored) Acuña

11 August 2021	12 de Octubre (SD) (3)	1–2	Rubio Ñu (2)	Villa Elisa
19:30	Bernal 88' (o.g.)	Report	Aquino 23'; Mereles 63'	Stadium: Luis Alfonso Giagni; Referee: Juan Franco

12 August 2021	Oriental (4)	1–1 (4–3 p)	Deportivo Capiatá (2)	Asunción
17:00	Cabrera 53'	Report	Báez 83'	Stadium: Arsenio Erico; Referee: Sixto Mercado
	Penalties
	Martínez (penalty missed); Jara (penalty scored); Soler (penalty scored); Speratti (penalty scored); D. González (penalty scored)		(penalty scored) Pérez; (penalty missed) Bracho; (penalty scored) Aquino; (penalty missed) Saldívar; (penalty scored) Báez

12 August 2021	Humaitá (4)	2–2 (5–6 p)	Independiente (CG) (2)	Asunción
19:30	Arboleda 63'; Cardozo 75'	Report	Orué 13'; Garay 45+1'	Stadium: Arsenio Erico; Referee: Héctor Bernal
	Penalties
	Ortellado (penalty scored); Arrúa (penalty scored); Ramírez (penalty scored); González (penalty scored); Ibarra (penalty scored); Cardozo (penalty missed); Britez (penalty missed)		(penalty scored) Asta; (penalty scored) Benítez; (penalty scored) Villagra; (penalty scored) Fernández; (penalty scored) Garay; (penalty missed) Doldán; (penalty scored) Sanabria

16 August 2021	Mariscal Estigarribia (4)	5–1	San Lorenzo (2)	Pedro Juan Caballero
13:00	Fernández 11', 67' (pen.), 73'; Rojas 23'; Florenciano 47'	Report	Maciel 28'	Stadium: Río Parapití; Referee: Víctor Ruiz

16 August 2021	24 de Junio (4)	0–1	2 de Mayo (2)	Pedro Juan Caballero
15:00		Report	Cáceres 39'	Stadium: Río Parapití; Referee: Arthur Afara

17 August 2021	Sportivo Limpeño (3)	0–0 (3–4 p)	Tembetary (3)	Asunción
17:00		Report		Stadium: Martín Torres; Referee: Julio Ojeda
	Penalties
	Molinas (penalty missed); F. Galeano (penalty scored); A. González (penalty scored); Jara (penalty scored); Paniagua (penalty missed)		(penalty scored) Cáceres; (penalty scored) Ju. Roa; (penalty scored) Villamayor; (penalty scored) González

17 August 2021	5 de Octubre (4)	1–0	General Díaz (2)	Asunción
19:30	Delvalle 13' (pen.)	Report		Stadium: Martín Torres; Referee: Alberto Candia

18 August 2021	Deportivo La Colmena (4)	0–4	Sportivo Iteño (2)	Villarrica
17:00		Report	Escobar 6' (pen.); Guerreño 30', 51'; Barreto 49'	Stadium: Parque del Guairá; Referee: Arcenio Mereles

18 August 2021	Coronel Martínez (4)	0–2	River Plate (1)	Villarrica
19:30		Report	Gallardo 53'; Alvarenga 87' (o.g.)	Stadium: Parque del Guairá; Referee: Gedidías Zacarías

19 August 2021	22 de Setiembre (3)	2–1	Atyrá (2)	Trinidad
13:00	Cristaldo 74'; Ortiz 88'	Report	Lázaro 34'	Stadium: Los Fundadores; Referee: Sixto Mercado

19 August 2021	Olimpia (I) (3)	0–0 (6–7 p)	Guaraní (T) (2)	Trinidad
15:00		Report		Stadium: Los Fundadores; Referee: Héctor Bernal
	Penalties
	Ramos (penalty scored); Recalde (penalty scored); R. Gómez (penalty scored); Bourdier (penalty missed); Valdez (penalty scored); Caputo (penalty scored); Orué (penalty missed); Báez (penalty scored); Miranda (penalty missed)		(penalty scored) Portillo; (penalty scored) M. González; (penalty scored) Chaparro; (penalty missed) Gómez; (penalty scored) Lezcano; (penalty scored) Dávalos; (penalty missed) Britto; (penalty scored) Ortiz; (penalty scored) J. González

24 August 2021	Karai Chivé (4)	1–1 (4–2 p)	12 de Octubre (VR) (4)	Villarrica
17:00	Á. Velázquez 67' (o.g.)	Report	Giménez 62' (pen.)	Stadium: Parque del Guairá; Referee: Ángel Brítez
	Penalties
	Duarte (penalty scored); Gómez (penalty scored); Villalba (penalty missed); Lezcano (penalty scored); García (penalty scored)		(penalty scored) Mujica; (penalty scored) Giménez; (penalty missed) Oporto; (penalty missed) Á. Torres

24 August 2021	24 de Setiembre (VP) (3)	0–3	Guaireña (1)	Villarrica
19:30		Report	Duarte 52', 56' (pen.); Cáceres 68'	Stadium: Parque del Guairá; Referee: Héctor Bernal

25 August 2021	Atlético Juventud (4)	2–0	Sportivo Trinidense (2)	Asunción
13:00	González 52'; Arrúa 89' (pen.)	Report		Stadium: La Arboleda; Referee: Víctor Ruiz

25 August 2021	1° de Marzo FBC (4)	0–0 (3–0 p)	Nacional (1)	Asunción
15:15		Report		Stadium: La Arboleda; Referee: César Rolón
	Penalties
	Cabañas (penalty scored); Amarilla (penalty scored); Enciso (penalty scored)		(penalty missed) Prieto; (penalty missed) Fleitas; (penalty missed) Colmán

26 August 2021	Cristóbal Colón (JAS) (3)	4–0	Deportivo Pinozá (4)	Itauguá
17:00	Chaparro 24'; Centurión 35'; Ricardo 74', 79'	Report		Stadium: Luis Alberto Salinas; Referee: Rodrigo Serafini

26 August 2021	Atlético Mil Palos (4)	1–6	12 de Octubre (I) (1)	Itauguá
19:30	Araújo 70'	Report	Bobadilla 12', 90+1'; Ortiz 34'; Brítez 44', 50'; Álvarez 82'	Stadium: Luis Alberto Salinas; Referee: Derlis Benítez

== Round of 32 ==
The schedule for the round of 32 was confirmed by the APF on 26 August 2021. Matches in this round were played from 1 to 23 September 2021.

1 September 2021	5 de Octubre (4)	0–3	Deportivo Santaní (2)	Villa Elisa
17:00		Report	Leiva 37'; Meza 81', 83'	Stadium: Luis Alfonso Giagni; Referee: Víctor Ruiz

1 September 2021	Atlético Juventud (4)	0–2	Libertad (1)	Villa Elisa
19:30		Report	Espinoza 42'; Franco 45'	Stadium: Luis Alfonso Giagni; Referee: José Armoa

13 September 2021	Tembetary (3)	2–1	Presidente Hayes (3)	Capiatá
17:00	Maciel 52', 90+6'	Report	Núñez 63'	Stadium: Erico Galeano; Referee: César Rolón

13 September 2021	Sportivo Iteño (2)	1–1 (4–3 p)	Mariscal Estigarribia (4)	Capiatá
19:30	Díaz 43'	Report	Pérez 57'	Stadium: Erico Galeano; Referee: Luis Urunaga
	Penalties
	Gauto (penalty scored); Barreto (penalty scored); Loncharich (penalty scored); Díaz (penalty scored)		(penalty scored) Soares; (penalty scored) Blanco; (penalty missed) Mendoza; (penalty scored) Villamayor; (penalty missed) Fernández

14 September 2021	Guaraní (T) (2)	3–0	Sport Sastreño (4)	Villa Hayes
17:15	Dietze 45+1', 50'; Dávalos 88'	Report		Stadium: Isidro Roussillón; Referee: Marco Franco

15 September 2021	Cerro Porteño (1)	1–1 (4–1 p)	General Caballero (JLM) (2)	Juan León Mallorquín
14:45	Fariña 29'	Report	Arce 44'	Stadium: Ka'arendy; Referee: César Herebia
	Penalties
	Muñoz (penalty scored); Giménez (penalty scored); Bobadilla (penalty scored); Ovelar (penalty scored)		(penalty missed) Mareco; (penalty missed) Acuña; (penalty scored) Lezcano

15 September 2021	Resistencia (2)	8–4	Cristóbal Colón (Ñ) (3)	Asunción
17:15	Arévalos 6', 45+1', 58', 90+2'; Blanco 54'; J. Cáceres 74' (pen.), 89'; Báez 90'	Report	Ó. Cáceres 32'; Roa 60', 79', 82'	Stadium: Arsenio Erico; Referee: Julio Quintana

15 September 2021	Cristóbal Colón (JAS) (3)	2–3	Olimpia (1)	Asunción
19:45	Miranda 36'; Santa Cruz 72' (o.g.)	Report	Recalde 1'; Santa Cruz 17'; Sosa 41'	Stadium: Arsenio Erico; Referee: David Ojeda

16 September 2021	Guaireña (1)	2–1	Oriental (4)	Ciudad del Este
17:00	Florenciañez 40'; Alborno 90+3'	Report	Alvarenga 58'	Stadium: Antonio Aranda; Referee: Gedidías Zacarías

16 September 2021	3 de Febrero (CDE) (2)	0–1	12 de Octubre (I) (1)	Ciudad del Este
19:30		Report	D. Mendieta 30'	Stadium: Antonio Aranda; Referee: Blas Romero

21 September 2021	Karai Chivé (4)	2–4	River Plate (1)	Asunción
17:00	González 62'; Acosta 79'	Report	Sosa 45+1'; Zeballos 46', 67'; Caballero 84' (pen.)	Stadium: Martín Torres; Referee: Christian Aquino

21 September 2021	Sportivo Ameliano (2)	2–1	Independiente (CG) (2)	Asunción
19:30	Merlo 45'; Olmedo 74' (pen.)	Report	Riveros 40'	Stadium: Martín Torres; Referee: Julio Quintana

22 September 2021	Sportivo Luqueño (1)	3–2	Fernando de la Mora (2)	Asunción
16:15	Parra 40'; González Ozuna 58'; Pérez 74'	Report	Giménez 17'; Acosta 60'	Stadium: River Plate; Referee: Sergio Melgarejo

22 September 2021	Rubio Ñu (2)	3–4	Sol de América (1)	Asunción
20:15	Espínola 11'; Coronel 18'; Oviedo 35'	Report	Viera 22' (pen.), 70'; Báez 36'; Jiménez 64'	Stadium: River Plate; Referee: Blas Romero

23 September 2021	2 de Mayo (2)	3–0	22 de Setiembre (3)	Luque
15:30	Aranda 73'; Cáceres 79', 90+4'	Report		Stadium: Feliciano Cáceres; Referee: Sixto Mercado

23 September 2021	1° de Marzo FBC (4)	1–4	Tacuary (2)	Luque
18:00	R. Amarilla 18'	Report	Rodríguez 25'; Giménez 36'; V. Matta 72' (pen.); A. Amarilla 87'	Stadium: Feliciano Cáceres; Referee: David Ojeda

== Bracket ==
Round of 16
Cerro Porteño	0
Sol de América	2
2 de Mayo	1 (4)
Deportivo Santaní (p)	1 (5)
River Plate	0
Tembetary	1
Tacuary (p)	0 (4)
Sportivo Iteño	0 (3)
Olimpia	2
Resistencia	1
Sportivo Ameliano	0 (4)
Guaireña (p)	0 (5)
Libertad	5
Guaraní (T)	0
Sportivo Luqueño (p)	1 (4)
12 de Octubre (I)	1 (3)

Quarter-finals
Sol de América	1
Deportivo Santaní	0
Tembetary (p)	1 (4)
Tacuary	1 (2)
Olimpia	2
Guaireña	0
Libertad	2
Sportivo Luqueño	0

Semi-finals
Sol de América (p)	0 (5)
Tembetary	0 (4)
Olimpia (p)	1 (5)
Libertad	1 (4)

Final
Sol de América	2 (1)
Olimpia (p)	2 (3)
Third place play-off
Tembetary	0
Libertad	2

== Round of 16 ==
The schedule for the round of 16 was announced by the APF on 28 September 2021. Matches in this round were played from 5 to 20 October 2021.

5 October 2021	Sportivo Luqueño (1)	1–1 (4–3 p)	12 de Octubre (I) (1)	Villa Elisa
17:30	Pérez 61'	Report	Doldán 80'	Stadium: Luis Alfonso Giagni; Referee: César Rolón
	Penalties
	Borja (penalty scored); Castro (penalty scored); Palau (penalty scored); Ortiz (penalty scored)		(penalty missed) Aguilar; (penalty scored) González; (penalty scored) Paredes; (penalty scored) Núñez; (penalty missed) D. Mendieta

5 October 2021	Olimpia (1)	2–1	Resistencia (2)	Villa Elisa
20:00	D. González 36', 69'	Report	Olveira 46' (o.g.)	Stadium: Luis Alfonso Giagni; Referee: Gedidías Zacarías

6 October 2021	River Plate (1)	0–1	Tembetary (3)	Asunción
17:30		Report	Mereles 69'	Stadium: Arsenio Erico; Referee: Nelson Palma

6 October 2021	Cerro Porteño (1)	0–2	Sol de América (1)	Asunción
20:00		Report	Viera 53'; Cazal 81'	Stadium: Arsenio Erico; Referee: César Herebia

13 October 2021	Tacuary (2)	0–0 (4–3 p)	Sportivo Iteño (2)	San Estanislao
16:00		Report		Stadium: Juan José Vázquez; Referee: Aldo Quiñónez
	Penalties
	V. Matta (penalty scored); Velázquez (penalty scored); Bernal (penalty missed); M. Matta (penalty scored); Domínguez (penalty scored)		(penalty scored) Gauto; (penalty missed) Escobar; (penalty missed) Díaz; (penalty scored) O. Benítez; (penalty scored) E. Benítez

13 October 2021	2 de Mayo (2)	1–1 (4–5 p)	Deportivo Santaní (2)	San Estanislao
18:15	Cáceres 65'	Report	V. Villalba 47'	Stadium: Juan José Vázquez; Referee: Nelson Palma
	Penalties
	Jara (penalty scored); Oviedo (penalty scored); Paredes (penalty missed); Cáceres (penalty scored); Leguizamón (penalty scored)		(penalty scored) Álvarez; (penalty scored) V. Villalba; (penalty scored) Sequeira; (penalty scored) Coronel; (penalty scored) Ovando

20 October 2021	Libertad (1)	5–0	Guaraní (T) (2)	Villa Elisa
17:30	Ferreira 9'; Enciso 56', 83'; Bogarín 65'; Cardozo 85'	Report		Stadium: Luis Alfonso Giagni; Referee: César Rolón

20 October 2021	Sportivo Ameliano (2)	0–0 (4–5 p)	Guaireña (1)	Villa Elisa
20:00		Report		Stadium: Luis Alfonso Giagni; Referee: Derlis Benítez
	Penalties
	Báez (penalty scored); Duré (penalty scored); Rojas (penalty scored); Merlo (penalty missed); Cabrera (penalty missed); Gaitán (penalty scored); Riquelme (penalty missed)		(penalty missed) Candia; (penalty scored) Miño; (penalty scored) Cantero; (penalty scored) Brizuela; (penalty missed) Florenciañez; (penalty scored) Fr. Parra; (penalty scored) Ruiz

== Quarter-finals ==
The schedule for the quarter-finals was announced by the APF on 22 October 2021. Matches in this round were played from 3 to 10 November 2021.

3 November 2021	Libertad (1)	2–0	Sportivo Luqueño (1)	Villa Elisa
17:45	Enciso 60'; Melgarejo 87'	Report		Stadium: Luis Alfonso Giagni; Referee: César Rolón

3 November 2021	Tembetary (3)	1–1 (4–2 p)	Tacuary (2)	Villa Elisa
20:15	Maciel 49'	Report	Salcedo 65'	Stadium: Luis Alfonso Giagni; Referee: Gedidías Zacarías
	Penalties
	Cáceres (penalty scored); Fernández (penalty scored); Mazacote (penalty scored); Olmedo (penalty missed); Maciel (penalty scored)		(penalty missed) Domínguez; (penalty missed) Bareiro; (penalty scored) M. Matta; (penalty scored) Aguilar

4 November 2021	Olimpia (1)	2–0	Guaireña (1)	Luque
17:45	D. González 12'; Salcedo 57'	Report		Stadium: Feliciano Cáceres; Referee: Nelson Palma

10 November 2021	Sol de América (1)	1–0	Deportivo Santaní (2)	Luque
19:30	Ayala 27'	Report		Stadium: Feliciano Cáceres; Referee: Aldo Quiñónez

== Semi-finals ==
The schedule for the semi-finals was announced by the APF on 7 November 2021. Both matches were played on 14 November 2021 at Estadio Defensores del Chaco in Asunción.

14 November 2021	Olimpia (1)	1–1 (5–4 p)	Libertad (1)	Asunción
18:15	D. González 3'	Report	Melgarejo 35'	Stadium: Defensores del Chaco; Referee: Carlos Benítez
	Penalties
	Recalde (penalty scored); Quintana (penalty scored); Ortiz (penalty scored); W. González (penalty scored); D. González (penalty scored)		(penalty missed) Vangioni; (penalty scored) Bocanegra; (penalty scored) Melgarejo; (penalty scored) Espinoza; (penalty scored) Cardozo

14 November 2021	Sol de América (1)	0–0 (5–4 p)	Tembetary (3)	Asunción
20:30		Report		Stadium: Defensores del Chaco; Referee: Juan Gabriel Benítez
	Penalties
	Viera (penalty scored); Godoy (penalty scored); Leal (penalty missed); Rojas (penalty scored); De La Cruz (penalty scored); Leguizamón (penalty scored)		(penalty missed) Cáceres; (penalty scored) Fernández; (penalty scored) Mazacote; (penalty scored) Ortiz; (penalty scored) Maciel; (penalty missed) Ju. Roa

== Third place play-off ==
30 November 2021
19:00

Tembetary (3)	0–2	Libertad (1)
	Report	Enciso 30'; Melgarejo 63'

Estadio Luis Alfonso Giagni, Villa Elisa
Referee: David Ojeda

== Final ==
1 December 2021
19:00

Sol de América (1)	2–2	Olimpia (1)
Toledo 4', 43'	Report	Salcedo 23'; D. González 86' (pen.)
Penalties
Da Silva (penalty scored); Godoy (penalty missed); Rojas (penalty missed); Ozuna (penalty missed)	1–3	(penalty scored) Recalde; (penalty scored) Ortiz; (penalty scored) Torres

Estadio Defensores del Chaco, Asunción
Referee: José Méndez
