= 2021 Supercopa Paraguay =

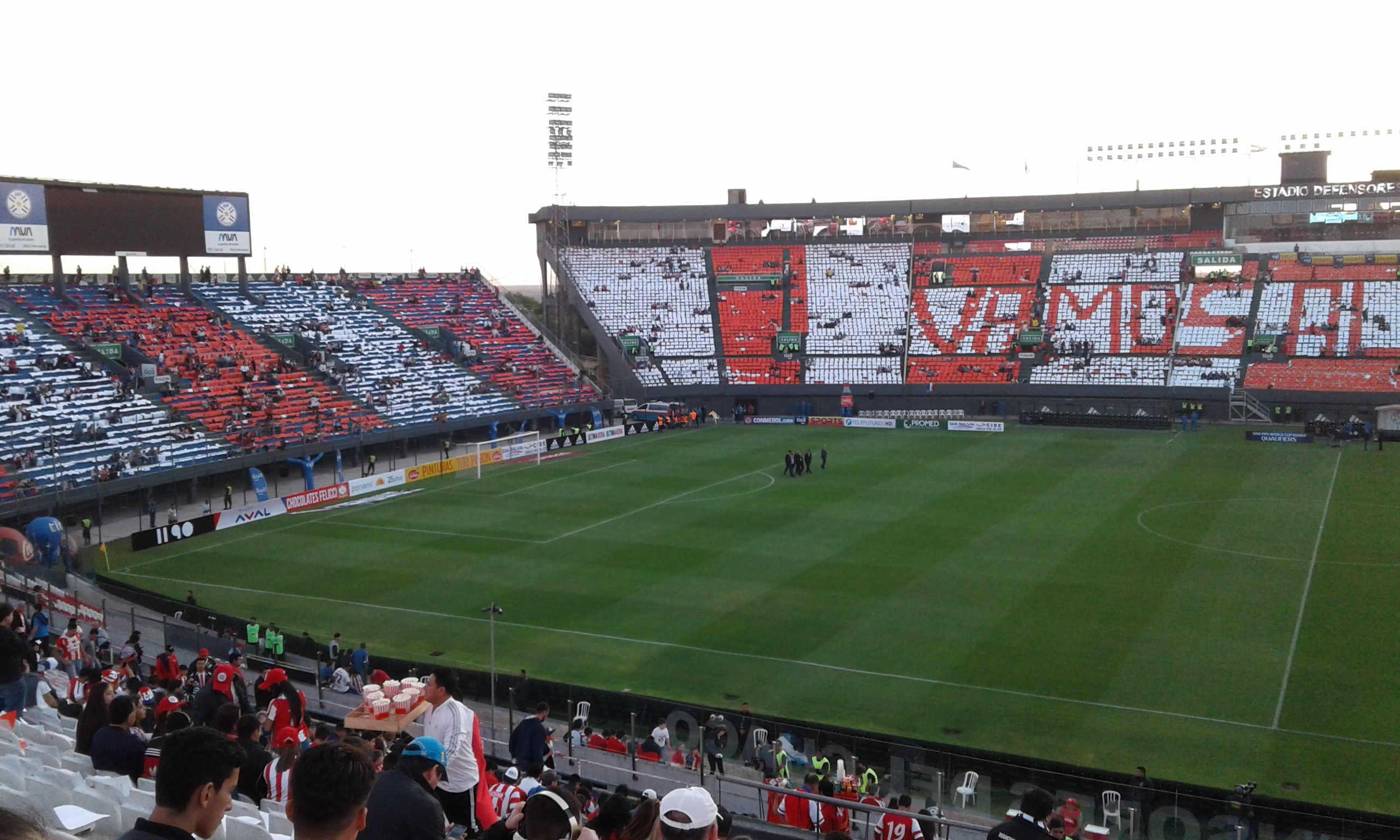
- Estadio Defensores del Chaco hosted the match.
| Olimpia | Cerro Porteño |
| 3 | 1 |
- Date: 12 December 2021
- Venue: Estadio Defensores del Chaco, Asunción
- Referee: Eber Aquino

The 2021 Supercopa Paraguay was the first edition of the Supercopa Paraguay, Paraguay's football super cup. It was held on 12 December 2021 between the 2021 Primera División best-ranked champions in the aggregate table Cerro Porteño and the 2021 Copa Paraguay champions Olimpia, as the match that closed the 2021 season of Paraguayan football.

Olimpia were the winners, defeating Cerro Porteño by a 3–1 score.

== Teams ==
The Supercopa Paraguay is contested by two teams: the champions of the Copa Paraguay and the Primera División (Apertura or Clausura) champions with the best record in the aggregate table of the season.

| Team | Qualification |
|---|---|
| Olimpia | 2021 Copa Paraguay champions |
| Cerro Porteño | 2021 Primera División champions with better record in aggregate table |

== Details ==
12 December 2021
19:00 UTC−3

| Olimpia | 3–1 | Cerro Porteño |
|---|---|---|
| Santa Cruz 15'; Ortiz 66'; Silva 78' (pen.) | Report | Franco 90+2' |

Estadio Defensores del Chaco, Asunción
Referee: Eber Aquino

| Olimpia | Cerro Porteño |

| GK | 12 | (Paraguay) Alfredo Aguilar |
| RB | 2 | (Argentina) Víctor Salazar |
| CB | 21 | (Paraguay) Antolín Alcaraz |
| CB | 5 | (Paraguay) Saúl Salcedo |
| LB | 11 | (Paraguay) Iván Torres |
| RM | 3 | (Uruguay) Alejandro Silva | (yellow card) 79' | (substituted off) 82' |
| CM | 38 | (Paraguay) Hugo Quintana | (substituted off) 83' |
| CM | 6 | (Paraguay) Richard Ortiz | (yellow card) 67' |
| LM | 14 | (Paraguay) Fernando Cardozo |
| CF | 10 | (Paraguay) Derlis González |
| CF | 24 | (Paraguay) Roque Santa Cruz (c) | (substituted off) 73' |
Substitutes:
| GK | 1 | (Uruguay) Gastón Olveira |
| DF | 15 | (Paraguay) Mateo Gamarra |
| MF | 7 | (Paraguay) Néstor Camacho |
| MF | 17 | (Paraguay) Ramón Sosa |
| MF | 23 | (Paraguay) Adelio Zárate | (substituted on) 83' |
| FW | 9 | (Paraguay) Walter González | (substituted on) 73' |
| FW | 17 | (Paraguay) Jorge Recalde | (substituted on) 82' |
Manager:
(Paraguay) Julio César Cáceres

| GK | 13 | (Brazil) Jean | (red card) 0' |
| RB | 17 | (Paraguay) Leonardo Rivas | (yellow card) 60' |
| CB | 4 | (Paraguay) Alexis Duarte | (yellow card) 76' |
| CB | 24 | (Paraguay) Juan Patiño (c) |
| LB | 21 | (Paraguay) Alan Rodríguez | (substituted off) 68' |
| RM | 2 | (Paraguay) Alan Benítez |
| CM | 7 | (Paraguay) Enzo Giménez | (substituted off) 82' |
| CM | 15 | (Paraguay) Ángel Cardozo Lucena |
| LM | 6 | (Colombia) Rafael Carrascal |
| CF | 31 | (Paraguay) Robert Morales | (yellow card) 69' |
| CF | 40 | (Argentina) Adrián Martínez | (substituted off) 72' |
Substitutes:
| GK | 1 | (Uruguay) Rodrigo Muñoz | (substituted on) 0' |
| DF | 19 | (Paraguay) Carlos Rolón |
| DF | 33 | (Paraguay) Fabián Franco | (substituted on) 82' |
| MF | 10 | (Argentina) Luis Fariña | (substituted on) 72' |
| MF | 28 | (Paraguay) Junior Noguera | (substituted on) 68' |
| MF | 32 | (Paraguay) Damián Bobadilla |
| FW | 18 | (Paraguay) Fernando Romero |
Manager:
(Paraguay) Francisco Arce

Assistant referees:
Eduardo Cardozo
Milciades Saldívar
Fourth official:
Carlos Benítez
Video assistant referee:
Mario Díaz de Vivar
Assistant video assistant referee:
Eduardo Britos
Support referee:
Fernando López

Match rules

- 90 minutes.
- Penalty shoot-out if scores still level.
- Seven named substitutes.
- Maximum of three substitutions.
