= 2022 APF División de Honor =

Paraguayan Primera División season

Primera División
- Season: 2022
- Dates: 4 February – 13 November 2022
- Champions: Apertura: Libertad (22nd title); Clausura: Olimpia (46th title)
- Relegated: Sol de América; 12 de Octubre
- Copa Libertadores: Olimpia; Libertad; Cerro Porteño; Nacional
- Copa Sudamericana: Guaraní; Tacuary; General Caballero (JLM); Sportivo Ameliano (via Copa Paraguay)
- Matches: 264
- Goals: 659 (2.5 per match)
- Top goalscorer: Apertura: Fernando Fernández (13 goals); Clausura: Derlis González and Lorenzo Melgarejo (12 goals each)
- Biggest home win: Olimpia 6–1 Resistencia (19 June); Cerro Porteño 5–0 Tacuary (25 September)
- Biggest away win: 12 de Octubre 1–6 Libertad (5 February); Resistencia 1–6 Olimpia (27 October)
- Highest scoring: 12 de Octubre 1–6 Libertad (5 February); Olimpia 6–1 Resistencia (19 June); Resistencia 1–6 Olimpia (27 October)

The 2022 División Profesional season (officially the Copa de Primera TIGO-Visión Banco 2022 for sponsorship reasons) was the 88th season of the Paraguayan Primera División, the top-flight professional football league in Paraguay. The season began on 4 February and ended on 13 November 2022. The fixtures for the season were announced on 14 December 2021.

In the Torneo Apertura Libertad won their twenty-second league championship, clinching the title with one match in hand after beating Cerro Porteño by a 1–0 score on 25 June, whilst the Torneo Clausura was won by Olimpia, who claimed their forty-sixth league title after drawing 1–1 with Nacional on the last matchday played on 12 November. Cerro Porteño were the defending champions, having won the 2021 Clausura tournament.

== Teams ==
Twelve teams competed in the season: the top eight teams in the relegation table of the 2021 season, the top three teams in the 2021 Paraguayan División Intermedia (General Caballero (JLM), Resistencia, and Tacuary), as well as Sportivo Ameliano, winners of the promotion/relegation play-off. The promoted teams replaced River Plate and Sportivo Luqueño, who were relegated to the second tier at the end of the previous season.

=== Stadia and locations ===
Locations of the 2022 Primera División teams

Team	Manager	City	Stadium (Note: Teams occasionally play their home matches at Estadio Defensores del Chaco in Asunción. Derbies between Cerro Porteño and Olimpia are also usually played at this stadium.)	Capacity
12 de Octubre	(Paraguay) Héctor Marecos	Itauguá	Luis Alberto Salinas	10,000
Cerro Porteño	(Paraguay) Francisco Arce	Asunción	General Pablo Rojas	45,000
General Caballero (JLM)	(Paraguay) Humberto Ovelar	Juan León Mallorquín	Ka'arendy	10,000
Guaireña	(Paraguay) Troadio Duarte	Villarrica	Parque del Guairá	12,000
Guaraní	(Spain) Fernando Jubero	Asunción	Rogelio Livieres	6,000
Libertad	(Argentina) Daniel Garnero	Asunción	Tigo La Huerta	10,000
Nacional	(Paraguay) Pedro Sarabia	Asunción	Arsenio Erico	4,000
Olimpia	(Paraguay) Julio César Cáceres	Asunción	Manuel Ferreira	25,000
Resistencia	(Argentina) Mario Jara	Asunción	Jardines del Kelito (Note: Used as home stadium for the season since Resistencia's stadium Estadio Tomás Beggan Correa did not meet APF requirements.)	6,500
Sol de América	(Paraguay) Alfredo Vera (caretaker)	Villa Elisa	Luis Alfonso Giagni	11,000
Sportivo Ameliano	(Argentina) Juan Pablo Pumpido	Asunción	Martín Torres (Note: Used as home stadium for the season since Sportivo Ameliano's stadium Estadio José Tomás Silva did not meet APF requirements.)	3,000
Tacuary	(Paraguay) Robert Pereira	Asunción	Jardines del Kelito (Note: Used as home stadium for the season since Tacuary's stadium Estadio Toribio Vargas did not meet APF requirements.)	6,500

=== Managerial changes ===
Team	Outgoing manager	Manner of departure	Date of vacancy	Position in table	Incoming manager	Date of appointment
Torneo Apertura
General Caballero (JLM)	(Paraguay) Humberto Ovelar	Resigned	22 October 2021	Pre-season	(Paraguay) Gustavo Bobadilla	4 December 2021
Resistencia	(Paraguay) Pablo Caballero	Sacked	25 November 2021	Pre-season	(Paraguay) Roberto Torres	27 November 2021
Tacuary	(Argentina) Daniel Lanata	Sacked	22 February 2022	10th	(Paraguay) Robert Pereira	22 February 2022
Nacional	(Uruguay) Hernán Rodrigo López	Sacked	12 March 2022	7th	(Paraguay) Carlos Bonet	12 March 2022
12 de Octubre	(Paraguay) Pedro Sarabia	Resigned	22 March 2022	10th	(Uruguay) Sergio Órteman	22 March 2022
Nacional	(Paraguay) Carlos Bonet	Return to sporting director post	24 March 2022	11th	(Paraguay) Pedro Sarabia	24 March 2022
Sol de América	(Argentina) Juan Pablo Pumpido	Resigned	3 April 2022	5th	(Paraguay) Celso Ayala	4 April 2022
General Caballero (JLM)	(Paraguay) Gustavo Bobadilla	Resigned	20 April 2022	10th	(Argentina) Luciano Theiler	21 April 2022
Tacuary	(Paraguay) Robert Pereira	Resigned	1 May 2022	7th	(Paraguay) Humberto Ovelar	2 May 2022
12 de Octubre	(Uruguay) Sergio Órteman	Sacked	3 June 2022	12th	(Paraguay) Robert Pereira	3 June 2022
Sol de América	(Paraguay) Celso Ayala	Resigned	2 July 2022	7th	(Argentina) Pablo Guiñazú	2 July 2022
Torneo Clausura
Tacuary	(Paraguay) Humberto Ovelar	Sacked	5 July 2022	Pre-tournament	(Paraguay) Iván Almeida	5 July 2022
General Caballero (JLM)	(Argentina) Luciano Theiler	Sacked	8 August 2022	8th	(Paraguay) Gustavo Florentín	8 August 2022
12 de Octubre	(Paraguay) Robert Pereira	Sacked	21 August 2022	12th	(Paraguay) Héctor Marecos	21 August 2022
Resistencia	(Paraguay) Roberto Torres	Sacked	11 September 2022	8th	(Argentina) Mario Jara	11 September 2022
General Caballero (JLM)	(Paraguay) Gustavo Florentín	Resigned	16 September 2022	11th	(Paraguay) Humberto Ovelar	17 September 2022
Sportivo Ameliano	(Paraguay) Humberto García	Sacked	18 September 2022	8th	(Argentina) Juan Pablo Pumpido	18 September 2022
Tacuary	(Paraguay) Iván Almeida	Sacked	12 October 2022	8th	(Paraguay) Robert Pereira	12 October 2022
Sol de América	(Argentina) Pablo Guiñazú	Sacked	9 November 2022	10th	(Paraguay) Alfredo Vera (Note: Caretaker manager.)	9 November 2022

== Torneo Apertura ==
The Campeonato de Apertura, named "Homenaje a Luis Alberto Pettengill Castillo", was the 125th official championship of the Primera División and the first championship of the 2022 season. It started on 4 February and ended on 3 July.

=== Standings ===
Pos	Team	Pld	W	D	L	GF	GA	GD	Pts	Qualification
1	Libertad (C)	22	18	3	1	49	14	+35	57	Qualification for Copa Libertadores group stage
2	Cerro Porteño	22	16	2	4	39	13	+26	50	
3	Olimpia	22	13	4	5	41	23	+18	43	
4	Guaraní	22	9	5	8	30	24	+6	32	
5	Resistencia	22	7	7	8	30	36	−6	28	
6	Nacional	22	7	5	10	27	32	−5	26	
7	Sol de América	22	6	7	9	20	28	−8	25	
8	Guaireña	22	5	8	9	21	26	−5	23	
9	General Caballero (JLM)	22	6	5	11	23	33	−10	23	
10	Tacuary	22	6	4	12	16	29	−13	22	
11	Sportivo Ameliano	22	5	4	13	25	39	−14	19	
12	12 de Octubre	22	3	8	11	16	40	−24	17	

Source: APF, Soccerway
Rules for classification: 1) Points, 2) Playoff game (only if needed to decide championship between two teams), 3) Goal difference, 4) Goals for, 5) Away goals for, 6) Drawing of lots.
(C) Champions

=== Results ===
Home \ Away	12O	CCP	GCM	GFC	GUA	LIB	NAC	OLI	RES	SOL	SPA	TAC
12 de Octubre	—	0–1	1–3	0–4	1–3	1–6	1–2	0–0	1–1	0–1	2–1	2–0
Cerro Porteño	2–0	—	3–1	0–0	2–0	4–0	1–0	0–2	1–0	4–0	3–2	1–0
General Caballero (JLM)	0–0	0–0	—	0–1	0–4	0–1	1–2	2–3	2–1	1–1	0–3	2–0
Guaireña	0–0	0–2	1–2	—	0–0	2–3	1–1	1–3	0–0	2–1	2–1	0–0
Guaraní	3–0	1–2	3–1	2–1	—	1–1	0–1	0–2	3–3	0–1	1–1	1–2
Libertad	4–0	1–0	1–0	2–0	2–0	—	1–0	1–0	2–2	3–1	2–0	3–0
Nacional	2–2	2–3	1–2	3–1	0–1	0–3	—	1–1	1–2	0–3	2–1	3–0
Olimpia	4–1	0–4	2–2	1–0	1–0	2–2	1–2	—	6–1	1–0	0–2	2–0
Resistencia	0–1	0–3	2–1	2–2	1–2	0–4	3–1	2–1	—	0–0	3–0	1–0
Sol de América	0–0	2–1	2–3	1–0	2–2	0–3	0–0	0–1	1–1	—	0–1	1–0
Sportivo Ameliano	2–2	0–1	1–0	2–2	0–1	1–3	2–2	1–4	1–4	3–1	—	0–2
Tacuary	1–1	2–0	0–0	0–1	0–2	0–1	2–1	1–4	3–1	2–2	1–0	—

Source: APF, Soccerway
Legend: Blue = home team win; Yellow = draw; Red = away team win.

=== Top scorers ===
Rank	Name	Club	Goals
1	(Paraguay) Fernando Fernández	Guaraní	13
2	(Argentina) Facundo Bruera	Nacional	12
3	(Paraguay) Julio César Enciso	Libertad	11
4	(Paraguay) Junior Marabel	General Caballero (JLM)	8
4	(Paraguay) Robert Morales	Cerro Porteño	8
4	(Paraguay) Alfio Oviedo	Cerro Porteño	8
4	(Paraguay) Guillermo Paiva	Olimpia	8
8	(Paraguay) Walter González	Olimpia	7
8	(Paraguay) Roque Santa Cruz	Libertad	7
8	(Uruguay) Alejandro Silva	Olimpia	7

Source: Soccerway

== Torneo Clausura ==
The Campeonato de Clausura, named "Homenaje to Alexandro Arce Añazco", was the 126th official championship of the Primera División and the second championship of the 2022 season. It began on 14 July and ended on 13 November.

=== Standings ===
Pos	Team	Pld	W	D	L	GF	GA	GD	Pts	Qualification
1	Olimpia (C)	22	15	4	3	42	19	+23	49	Qualification for Copa Libertadores group stage
2	Cerro Porteño	22	14	6	2	32	13	+19	48	
3	Nacional	22	13	6	3	30	16	+14	45	
4	Libertad	22	10	4	8	35	27	+8	34	
5	Tacuary	22	9	4	9	27	25	+2	31	
6	Sportivo Ameliano	22	9	2	11	29	32	−3	29	
7	General Caballero (JLM)	22	8	4	10	26	26	0	28	
8	Guaireña	22	7	6	9	26	31	−5	27	
9	Guaraní	22	6	5	11	23	32	−9	23	
10	Sol de América	22	5	6	11	21	33	−12	21	
11	Resistencia	22	5	6	11	16	32	−16	21	
12	12 de Octubre	22	3	3	16	16	37	−21	12	

Source: APF, Soccerway
Rules for classification: 1) Points, 2) Playoff game (only if needed to decide championship between two teams), 3) Goal difference, 4) Goals for, 5) Away goals for, 6) Drawing of lots.
(C) Champions

=== Results ===
Home \ Away	12O	CCP	GCM	GFC	GUA	LIB	NAC	OLI	RES	SOL	SPA	TAC
12 de Octubre	—	0–1	0–3	0–0	0–1	1–3	1–2	1–3	1–0	0–2	4–0	0–2
Cerro Porteño	2–1	—	2–1	2–2	1–1	1–0	0–0	1–2	1–0	2–0	2–1	5–0
General Caballero (JLM)	2–1	1–1	—	0–0	3–0	3–2	1–2	0–2	1–0	0–0	2–0	0–4
Guaireña	2–1	1–3	1–2	—	1–0	4–0	1–3	0–1	3–2	0–0	3–1	1–0
Guaraní	0–1	1–2	2–1	2–2	—	1–2	1–1	2–1	0–1	4–1	2–1	2–1
Libertad	2–2	0–0	1–0	4–2	2–2	—	0–1	4–2	4–0	4–1	2–1	2–0
Nacional	1–0	0–0	1–0	3–0	2–0	0–2	—	1–1	1–1	3–0	0–2	1–0
Olimpia	3–1	2–0	2–1	2–1	2–0	1–0	1–1	—	1–1	2–2	2–0	1–0
Resistencia	0–0	0–2	0–0	1–2	0–0	1–0	0–1	1–6	—	2–1	2–1	0–3
Sol de América	1–0	0–1	3–2	2–0	1–0	1–1	2–3	0–2	0–1	—	1–1	2–2
Sportivo Ameliano	2–0	0–2	2–0	2–0	4–2	2–0	1–2	0–2	3–2	2–1	—	2–0
Tacuary	5–1	0–1	0–3	0–0	2–0	1–0	2–1	2–1	1–1	1–0	1–1	—

Source: APF, Soccerway
Legend: Blue = home team win; Yellow = draw; Red = away team win.

=== Top scorers ===
Rank	Name	Club	Goals
1	(Paraguay) Derlis González	Olimpia	12
1	(Paraguay) Lorenzo Melgarejo	Libertad	12
3	(Paraguay) Óscar Cardozo	Libertad	11
4	(Paraguay) Fernando Fernández	Guaraní	8
4	(Paraguay) Danilo Santacruz	Nacional	8
4	(Paraguay) Nildo Viera	Guaireña	8
7	(Paraguay) Ronaldo Martínez	Resistencia	7
8	(Paraguay) Alex Arce	Sportivo Ameliano	6
8	(Argentina) Facundo Bruera	Nacional	6
8	(Paraguay) Brian Montenegro	Olimpia	6

Source: Soccerway

== Aggregate table ==
Pos	Team	Pld	W	D	L	GF	GA	GD	Pts	Qualification
1	Cerro Porteño	44	30	8	6	71	26	+45	98	Qualification for Copa Libertadores second stage
2	Olimpia (C)	44	28	8	8	83	42	+41	92	Qualification for Copa Libertadores group stage (Note: Olimpia also qualified for the 2022 Supercopa Paraguay as the best-ranked champions in the aggregate table.)
3	Libertad (C)	44	28	7	9	84	41	+43	91	Qualification for Copa Libertadores group stage
4	Nacional	44	20	11	13	57	48	+9	71	Qualification for Copa Libertadores first stage
5	Guaraní	44	15	10	19	53	56	−3	55	Qualification for Copa Sudamericana first stage
6	Tacuary	44	15	8	21	43	54	−11	53	Qualification for Copa Sudamericana first stage
7	General Caballero (JLM)	44	14	9	21	49	59	−10	51	Qualification for Copa Sudamericana first stage
8	Guaireña	44	12	14	18	47	57	−10	50	
9	Resistencia	44	12	13	19	46	68	−22	49	
10	Sportivo Ameliano	44	14	6	24	54	71	−17	48	Qualification for Copa Sudamericana first stage (Note: Sportivo Ameliano qualified for the Copa Sudamericana first stage by winning the 2022 Copa Paraguay.)
11	Sol de América	44	11	13	20	41	61	−20	46	
12	12 de Octubre	44	6	11	27	32	77	−45	29	

Source: APF
Rules for classification: 1) Points, 2) Playoff game (only if needed to decide international qualification between two teams), 3) Goal difference, 4) Goals for, 5) Away goals for, 6) Drawing of lots.
(C) Champions

== Relegation ==
Relegation was determined at the end of the season by computing an average of the number of points earned per game over the past three seasons. The two teams with the lowest average were relegated to the División Intermedia for the following season.

Pos	Team	2020 Pts	2021 Pts	2022 Pts	Total Pts	Total Pld	Avg	Relegation
1	Cerro Porteño	69	66	98	233	113	2.062	
2	Libertad	62	65	91	218	113	1.929	
3	Olimpia	62	51	92	205	113	1.814	
4	Guaraní	59	61	55	175	113	1.549	
5	Nacional	44	50	71	165	113	1.46	
6	Tacuary	—	—	53	53	44	1.205	
7	Guaireña	41	44	50	135	113	1.195	
8	General Caballero (JLM)	—	—	51	51	44	1.159	
9	Resistencia	—	—	49	49	44	1.114	
10	Sportivo Ameliano	—	—	48	48	44	1.091	
11	Sol de América (R)	35	42	46	123	113	1.088	Relegation to División Intermedia
12	12 de Octubre (R)	41	43	29	113	113	1	Relegation to División Intermedia

Source: APF

== Season awards ==
On 14 November 2022 a ceremony was held at the Sheraton Hotel in Asunción to announce the winners of the season awards (Premios de Primera), who were chosen based on voting by the managers of the 12 Primera División teams, local sports journalists, the APF's Referee Commission, the public as well as official statistics.

Award	Winner	Club
Best Player	(Paraguay) Derlis González	Olimpia
Revelation Player	(Paraguay) Diego Gómez	Libertad
People's Player	(Paraguay) Derlis González	Olimpia
Best Goal	(Paraguay) Richard Ortiz (against Cerro Porteño, Torneo Clausura Round 17)	Olimpia
Best Goalkeeper	(Brazil) Jean Paulo Fernandes	Cerro Porteño
Best Manager	(Paraguay) Julio César Cáceres	Olimpia
Best Referee	Éber Aquino	
Best VAR Referee	Fernando López	
Top Scorer	(Paraguay) Fernando Fernández (21 goals)	Guaraní
Fair Play Team	Guaraní	
Most Minutes played by U-19s	Libertad (1560 minutes)	

== See also ==
- 2022 Copa Paraguay
- 2022 Paraguayan División Intermedia
