= Gastón Olveira =

Paraguayan footballer (born 1993)

- Olveira with Paraguay in 2026

Personal information
- Full name: Gastón Hernán Olveira Echeverría
- Date of birth: 21 April 1993 (age 33)
- Place of birth: Montevideo, Uruguay
- Height: 1.91 m (6 ft 3 in)
- Position: Goalkeeper

Team information
- Current team: Olimpia
- Number: 1

Youth career
- River Plate Montevideo

Senior career*
Years	Team	Apps	(Gls)
2014–2021	River Plate Montevideo	95	(0)
2021	→ Olimpia (loan)	5	(0)
2022–	Olimpia	145	(0)

International career^{‡}
2026–	Paraguay	3	(0)
Medal record
Representing Uruguay
Men's Football
Pan American Games
Gold medal – first place	2015 Toronto	Team
- * Club domestic league appearances and goals as of 15 November 2026 ‡ National team caps and goals as of 15 November 2026

Gastón Hernán Olveira Echeverría (born 21 April 1993) is a professional footballer who plays as a goalkeeper for Paraguayan Primera División club Club Olimpia. Born in Uruguay, he plays for the Paraguay national team.

== Club career ==
Olveira began his career in 2013 with River Plate Montevideo. He made his league debut for the club on 19 April 2014 in a 2–1 away defeat to Sud América.

On 17 January 2021, Club Olimpia announced the signing of Olveira on a season long loan deal. At the end of the year, River Plate bought Olveira from River Plate and signed him on a permanently 4-year deal.

== International career ==
Olveira was part of Uruguay squad which won gold medal at the 2015 Pan American Games. On 11 October 2019, he received his first call-up to the Uruguay national team as a replacement for Fernando Muslera. On 21 October 2022, he was named in Uruguay's 55-man preliminary squad for the 2022 FIFA World Cup. However, he was not included in the final squad, which was announced three weeks later.

He was naturalized as Paraguayan in 2026, and was called up to the Paraguay national team in March 2026. On 1 June 2026, he was named by head coach Gustavo Alfaro in Paraguay's 26-man squad for the 2026 FIFA World Cup.

== Career statistics ==
=== Club ===
As of match played 7 November 2026

Appearances and goals by club, season and competition
Club	Season	League			Cup		Continental		Other		Total	
Club	Season	Division	Apps	Goals	Apps	Goals	Apps	Goals	Apps	Goals	Apps	Goals
River Plate Montevideo	2013–14	Liga AUF Uruguaya	1	0	—		0	0	—		1	0
River Plate Montevideo	2014–15	Liga AUF Uruguaya	15	0	—		0	0	—		15	0
River Plate Montevideo	2015–16	Liga AUF Uruguaya	12	0	—		0	0	—		12	0
River Plate Montevideo	2016	Liga AUF Uruguaya	7	0	—		—		—		7	0
River Plate Montevideo	2017	Liga AUF Uruguaya	4	0	—		—		—		4	0
River Plate Montevideo	2018	Liga AUF Uruguaya	0	0	—		—		—		0	0
River Plate Montevideo	2019	Liga AUF Uruguaya	35	0	—		4 (Note: Appearances in Copa Sudamericana.)	0	1 (Note: Appearance in Torneo Intermedio final.)	0	40	0
River Plate Montevideo	2020	Liga AUF Uruguaya	21	0	—		6	0	—		27	0
River Plate Montevideo	Total		95	0	—		10	0	1	0	106	0
Olimpia (loan)	2021	APF División de Honor	5	0	—		2 (Note: Appearances in Copa Libertadores.)	0	0	0	7	0
Olimpia	2022	APF División de Honor	33	0	—		11 (Note: Nine appearances in Copa Libertadores, and two appearances in Copa Sudamericana.)	0	—		44	0
Olimpia	2023	APF División de Honor	19	0	—		5	0	1 (Note: Appearance in Supercopa Paraguay.)	0	25	0
Olimpia	2024	APF División de Honor	42	0	3	0	1	0	—		46	0
Olimpia	2025	APF División de Honor	17	0	0	0	3	0	—		20	0
Olimpia	2026	APF División de Honor	33	0	0	0	9	0	—		42	0
Olimpia	Total		149	0	3	0	31	0	1	0	184	0
Career total			244	0	3	0	41	0	2	0	290	0

=== International ===
As of match played 13 November 2026

Appearances and goals by national team and year
National team	Year	Apps	Goals
Paraguay	2026	3	0
Total		3	0

== Honours ==
Olimpia

- Copa Paraguay: 2021
- Supercopa Paraguay: 2021
- APF División de Honor: 2022 Clausura, 2024 Clausura

Uruguay U22

- Pan American Games: 2015

Individual

- Uruguayan Primera División Team of the Year: 2019
