= Ramón Sosa =

Paraguayan footballer (born 1999)

- Sosa with Paraguay in 2026

Personal information
- Full name: Ramón Sosa Acosta
- Date of birth: 31 August 1999 (age 27)
- Place of birth: Maracaná, Paraguay
- Height: 1.78 m (5 ft 10 in)
- Position: Winger

Team information
- Current team: Palmeiras
- Number: 19

Youth career
- Tembetary
- River Plate-PY

Senior career*
| Years | Team | Apps | (Gls) |
| 2020–2021 | River Plate-PY | 29 | (4) |
| 2021–2022 | Olimpia | 30 | (3) |
| 2022–2023 | Gimnasia LP | 42 | (6) |
| 2023–2024 | Talleres | 48 | (14) |
| 2024–2025 | Nottingham Forest | 19 | (1) |
| 2025– | Palmeiras | 53 | (8) |

International career^{‡}
| 2022– | Paraguay | 32 | (1) |
- * Club domestic league appearances and goals as of 19 September 2026 ‡ National team caps and goals as of 21:15, 2 October 2026 (UTC)

Ramón Sosa Acosta (born 31 August 1999) is a Paraguayan professional footballer who plays as a winger for Campeonato Brasileiro Série A club Palmeiras, and the Paraguay national team.

Sosa started his senior career at River Plate Asunción, before moving to fellow Paraguayan club, Olimpia. He played for Argentine sides, such as Gimnasia La Plata and Talleres de Cordoba before moving to Europe, as he signed for the Premier League side, Nottingham Forest in August 2024. After one years in Nottingham Forest, Sosa signed for the Brazilian side, Palmeiras.

At international level, he made his debut for Paraguay at November 2022. He represented the nation at 2024 Copa América.

== Early life ==
Ramon Sosa was born in the small Paraguayan town of Maracaná. Since he was a child, he has always played football and began his career at the Tembetary club. After a brief stint training with Lanús, he moved to the capital city Asunción when he joined River Plate Asunción.

== Club career ==
=== River Plate ===
Sosa joined the youth setups of Division Profesional club Club River Plate (Asunción) at an early age. He eventually signed for the senior team in 2020, having a break-out season for the club. He scored his first goal for the club in a 1–1 draw against Club Nacional. Sosa went on to score 4 goals in 29 league appearances, as well as making two appearances in the Copa Sudamericana against Deportivo Cali, losing both games.

=== Olimpia ===
In January 2021, Sosa signed for Olimpia, in a deal reported to be about 800 thousand dollars. Sosa made his debut for the club in a 1–0 home loss to Club Libertad, playing the full 90 minutes. Sosa was performing well for his new club, with the team finishing second in the Torneo Apertura, and he was attracting attention from clubs such as Brazilian Serie A side Red Bull Bragantino, and even Brazilian giants Flamengo enguired about Sosa after their Copa Libertadores defeat to the Brazilians.

In the 2021 season, Sosa helped Olimpia to the 2021 Copa Paraguay trophy, scoring two goals in the competition, including the winner in a 3–2 win against Club Cristobal in the round of 32., as well as winning the Supercopa against bitter rivals Cerro Porteño, although he was an unused substitute in a 3–1 win.

In the entirety of the 2021 season, Sosa made 24 league appearances for Olimpia, scored two league goals. Sosa also made 6 appearances in the Copa Libertadores, scoring one goal.

=== Gimnasia ===
In January 2022 Sosa signed for Argentine Primera División team Gimasia La Plata for a reported $1.3 million on a three-year deal. On the signing, which he had been asking for a while, manager Néstor Gorosito said "Sosa arrives with an enormous projection from Paraguay," he also said that the Paraguayan team were looking at him. Sosa made his debut for his new club in a 0–0 draw away to Racing Club, receiving a yellow card. Sosa score his first goal for the club from the penalty spot in a 3–0 away win against Platense. Across the season Sosa scored 6 goals in 39 matches as he became a star player for Gimnasia, helping them back to continental football in qualification for the 2023 Copa Sudamericana.

=== Talleres ===
In January 2023, Sosa signed for Argentine Primera División team Talleres for a reported $2.26 million on a three-year deal. Sosa was subject to a bid from Major League Soccer side LA Galaxy in December 2023.

Sosa made his debut for the club in a 2–0 win over Atlético Tucumán in February 2023. He scored his first goal for the club in a 3–0 win over Instituto. He finished the season with 10 goals in 35 appearances in all competitions.

=== Nottingham Forest ===
On 16 August 2024, Sosa signed a five-year deal with Premier League club Nottingham Forest. He made his debut for the club in a EFL Cup second round fixture against Newcastle United, appearing as a 69th-minute substitute. Sosa scored his only Premier League goal for the club against Brighton & Hove Albion in an away game at the AMEX Stadium on 22 September.

== International career ==
Sosa never participated for any underage Paraguayan national teams, but in November 2022, he was called up to the senior team for their friendlies against Peru and Colombia, in which he made his debut in a 2–0 loss to Colombia.

Sosa was included in the Paraguay squad for the 2024 Copa América. The team was eliminated in the group stage, with Sosa playing every game and registering a goal in a 2–1 loss to Costa Rica.

Sosa was included in Paraguay's squad for the 2026 FIFA World Cup.

== Player profile ==
Ramón Sosa is 1.78 meters tall and weighs 75 kilograms. He primarily plays as a left winger, but he has also played on the right wing and as an attacking midfielder. While he has the ability to excel across the entire attacking front, his optimal performance is observed when he plays on the left. The Paraguayan footballer possesses several outstanding characteristics, with the most notable being his speed, acceleration, dribbling, and change of pace.

In a statistical report by SofaScore issued in March 2024, Sosa is ranked as the best dribbler in the 2024 Argentine Primera División.

He has been a standout in numerous matches with Talleres de Córdoba. During his time at the club, he was frequently regarded as "one of the most disruptive players in Argentine football" and also "the most disruptive player in Argentine football," often being described as "unstoppable."

== Career statistics ==
=== Club ===
As of match played 19 September 2026

Appearances, goals and assists by club, season and competition
| Club | Season | League | | | National cup (Note: Includes Copa Argentina, FA Cup, Copa do Brasil) | | League cup (Note: Includes EFL Cup) | | Continental | | Other | | Total | |
| Club | Season | Division | Apps | Goals | Apps | Goals | Apps | Goals | Apps | Goals | Apps | Goals | Apps | Goals |
|---|---|---|---|---|---|---|---|---|---|---|---|---|---|---|
| River Plate | 2020 | APF División de Honor | 29 | 4 | 0 | 0 | 0 | 0 | 2 (Note: Appearances in Copa Sudamericana) | 0 | 0 | 0 | 31 | 4 |
| Olimpia | 2021 | APF División de Honor | 24 | 2 | 0 | 0 | 0 | 0 | 6 (Note: Appearances in Copa Libertadores) | 1 | 0 | 0 | 30 | 3 |
| Gimasia La Plata | 2022 | AFA Liga Profesional de Fútbol | 39 | 6 | 3 | 0 | 0 | 0 | 0 | 0 | 0 | 0 | 42 | 6 |
| Talleres | 2023 | AFA Liga Profesional de Fútbol | 32 | 8 | 3 | 2 | 0 | 0 | 0 | 0 | 0 | 0 | 35 | 10 |
| Talleres | 2024 | AFA Liga Profesional de Fútbol | 16 | 6 | 0 | 0 | 0 | 0 | 5 | 1 | 0 | 0 | 21 | 7 |
| Talleres | Total | | 48 | 14 | 3 | 2 | 0 | 0 | 5 | 1 | 0 | 0 | 56 | 17 |
| Nottingham Forest | 2024–25 | Premier League | 19 | 1 | 3 | 2 | 1 | 0 | — | | — | | 23 | 3 |
| Palmeiras | 2025 | Série A | 23 | 3 | 2 | 0 | — | | 3 | 1 | — | | 28 | 4 |
| Palmeiras | 2026 | Série A | 20 | 4 | 3 | 2 | — | | 5 | 2 | 10 (Note: Appearances in Campeonato Paulista) | 1 | 38 | 9 |
| Palmeiras | Total | | 43 | 7 | 5 | 2 | — | | 7 | 3 | 10 | 1 | 65 | 13 |
| Career total | | | 202 | 34 | 14 | 6 | 1 | 0 | 21 | 5 | 10 | 1 | 248 | 46 |

=== International ===
As of match played 2 October 2026

Appearances and goals by national team and year
| National team | Year | Apps | Goals |
|---|---|---|---|
| Paraguay | 2022 | 1 | 0 |
| Paraguay | 2023 | 7 | 0 |
| Paraguay | 2024 | 12 | 1 |
| Paraguay | 2025 | 7 | 0 |
| Paraguay | 2026 | 5 | 0 |
| Total | | 32 | 1 |

List of international goals scored by Ramón Sosa
| No. | Date | Venue | Cap | Opponent | Score | Result | Competition |
|---|---|---|---|---|---|---|---|
| 1 | 2 July 2024 | Q2 Stadium, Austin, United States | 14 | Costa Rica | 1–2 | 1–2 | 2024 Copa America |

== Honours ==
Olimpia

- Copa Paraguay: 2021
- Supercopa Paraguay: 2021

Palmeiras

- Campeonato Paulista: 2026

Individual

- Arsenio Erico Award: 2024
