= Hugo Quintana =

Paraguayan footballer (born 2001)

Personal information
- Full name: Hugo Lorenzo Quintana Escobar
- Date of birth: 10 November 2001 (age 25)
- Place of birth: Asunción, Paraguay
- Height: 1.72 m (5 ft 8 in)
- Position: Midfielder

Team information
- Current team: Olimpia
- Number: 28

Youth career
- Albiverde
- 2015–2021: Olimpia
- 2020–2021: → Palmeiras (loan)

Senior career*
Years	Team	Apps	(Gls)
2018–	Olimpia	104	(13)
2020	→ 12 de Octubre (loan)	1	(0)
2024–2025	→ Liverpool Montevideo (loan)	36	(8)

International career
2019	Paraguay U20	1	(0)
- * Club domestic league appearances and goals as of 13 August 2025

Hugo Lorenzo Quintana Escobar (born 10 November 2001) is a Paraguayan professional footballer who plays as a midfielder for Olimpia.

== Club career ==
Born in Asunción, Quintana joined Olimpia's youth setup at the age of 14. He made his first team – and Primera División – debut on 29 April 2018, starting in a 3–0 home win over Sportivo Luqueño.

Quintana scored his first professional goal on 15 October 2018, netting his team's second in a 5–0 away routing of Deportivo Santaní. At the end of the season, he was elected as the Breakthrough Player.

In January 2020, Quintana moved on loan to 12 de Octubre, but only played one match before leaving to Palmeiras, where he was assigned to the under-20 team. He left the club in February 2021, after being rarely used.

Upon returning, Quintana was assigned back to Olimpia's first team, but suffered a knee injury in August 2022 which sidelined him for the remainder of the season.

== Career statistics ==
As of 12 December 2023

Club	Season	League			Cup		Continental		Other		Total	
Club	Season	Division	Apps	Goals	Apps	Goals	Apps	Goals	Apps	Goals	Apps	Goals
Olimpia	2018	Primera División	11	2	—		—		—		9	0
Olimpia	2019	Primera División	19	1	—		0	0	—		23	0
Olimpia	2021	Primera División	12	2	—		7 (Note: Appearance(s) in Copa Libertadores)	1	1 (Note: Appearance(s) in Supercopa Paraguay)	0	20	3
Olimpia	2022	Primera División	16	3	—		13 (Note: Eleven appearances and one goal in Copa Libertadores, two appearances in Copa Sudamericana)	1	—		29	4
Olimpia	2023	Primera División	32	2	0	0	6	0	—		38	2
Olimpia	Total		90	10	0	0	26	2	—		116	12
12 de Octubre (loan)	2020	Primera División	1	0	—		—		—		1	0
Career total			91	10	0	0	26	2	0	0	117	12
