= Jorge Recalde =

Jorge Recalde may refer to:

- Jorge Recalde (rally driver) (1951–2001), Argentine rally driver
- Jorge Recalde (footballer) (born 1992), Paraguayan footballer
