= Landaida =

Landaida is a surname. Notable people with the surname include:

- Enrique Landaida (born 1974), Paraguayan football manager
- Juan Landaida (born 1976), Argentine footballer
