= Derlis González =

Paraguayan footballer (born 1994)

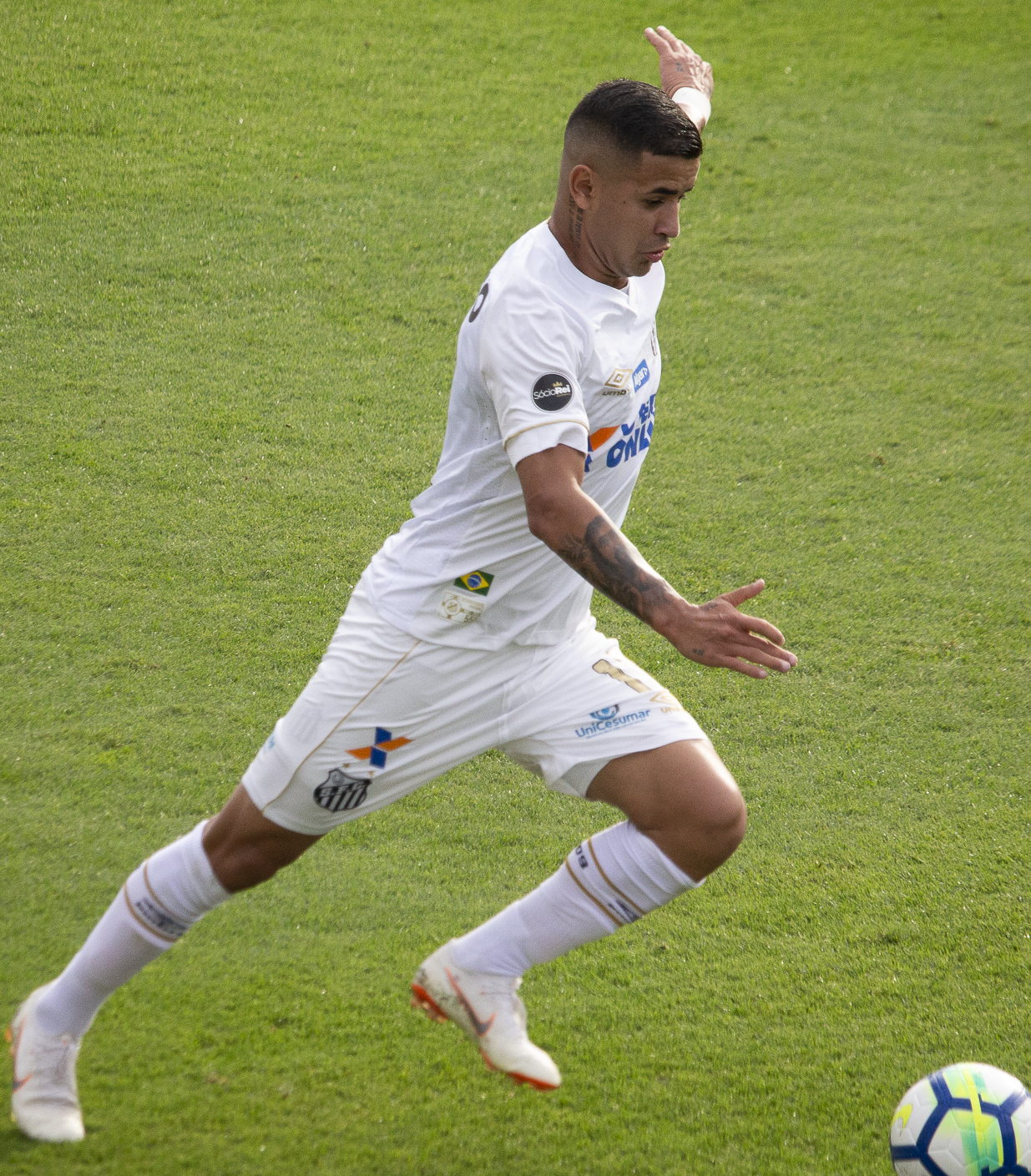
- González with Santos

Personal information
- Full name: Derlis Alberto González Galeano
- Date of birth: 20 March 1994 (age 32)
- Place of birth: Mariano Roque Alonso, Paraguay
- Height: 1.72 m (5 ft 8 in)
- Position: Forward

Team information
- Current team: Olimpia
- Number: 10

Youth career
- 2006–2009: Cerro Corá
- 2009–2010: Rubio Ñu
- 2012: Benfica

Senior career*
Years	Team	Apps	(Gls)
2009–2012	Rubio Ñu	51	(8)
2012–2014	Benfica	0	(0)
2013	→ Guaraní (loan)	32	(14)
2014	→ Olimpia (loan)	20	(9)
2014–2015	Basel	26	(3)
2015–2020	Dynamo Kyiv	50	(7)
2018–2020	→ Santos (loan)	31	(2)
2020–	Olimpia	140	(45)

International career^{‡}
2009	Paraguay U15		
2011	Paraguay U17	7	(6)
2013	Paraguay U20	12	(6)
2014–2022	Paraguay	50	(9)
- * Club domestic league appearances and goals as of 13 August 2025 ‡ National team caps and goals as of 17:57, 3 June 2024 (UTC)

Derlis Alberto González Galeano (born 20 March 1994) is a Paraguayan professional footballer who plays for Olimpia and the Paraguay national team. Mainly a forward, he can also play as a winger.

González began his career with Rubio Ñu in 2009, and in 2012 was signed by Portugal's Benfica, spending his time out on loan in Paraguay with Guaraní and Olimpia Asunción. In 2014, he joined Basel in the Swiss Super League.

In December 2015, González was awarded as the Paraguayan Footballer of the Year.

== Club career ==
=== Rubio Ñu ===
Born in Mariano Roque Alonso. González joined Rubio Ñu's youth setup in 2009, from Cerro Corá. He made his first-team – and Primera División – debut on 9 December of that year, starting in a 2–1 home win against 12 de Octubre; at the age of 15 years, becoming the club's youngest ever first-team player.

González scored his first senior goal on 19 September 2010, netting the opener in a 2–1 away defeat of Sportivo Trinidense. He would subsequently feature regularly for the first team in the following campaigns, as his side went on to establish themselves in the first division.

=== Benfica ===
On 10 October 2011, González agreed to a deal with Portuguese club Benfica, joining the club ahead of the 2012–13 season. Upon arriving, he was initially assigned to the under-19 squad in the Campeonato Nacional de Juniores.

In 2014, Benfica announced that González, together with compatriot Cláudio Correa, were sold to Master International FZC for €1.72 million.

==== Loan to Guaraní ====
On 12 February 2013, González was loaned to Guaraní until December. On 24 May 2013, González was referenced in the Spanish newspaper Marca as a future star, following the steps of Ángel Di María, who moved from Benfica to Real Madrid.

González scored 14 goals for Guaraní during the campaign, 12 only in the Clausura tournament. On 7 December 2013, he scored a hat-trick in a 6–0 home routing of Cerro Porteño PF.

==== Loan to Olimpia ====
On 16 January 2014, González moved to Olimpia until June, also in a temporary deal. He scored twice on his debut on 15 February, a 3–1 away success over General Díaz.

=== Basel ===
On 20 May 2014 Swiss club FC Basel announced that they had signed González on a five-year contract until 30 June 2019, for an undisclosed fee. He joined the team for their 2014–15 season under head coach Paulo Sousa. After playing in four test games González played his domestic league debut for the club in the away game in the Stadion Brügglifeld on 19 July 2014 as Basel won 2–1 against Aarau. He scored his first goal for his new club in the home game in the St. Jakob-Park on 31 August 2014. It was the first goal of the game, as Basel won 3–1 against BSC Young Boys.

The season ran well for Basel and their new striker. They entered the Champions League in the group stage. On 16 September González scored his first UEFA Champions League goal for Basel in a 5–1 group stage away defeat to Real Madrid. He added another on 4 November, in a 4–0 win over Ludogorets Razgrad. Basel reached the knockout phase on 9 December 2014, as they managed a 1–1 draw at Anfield against Liverpool. On 18 February 2015, González opened the scoring in the round of 16 first leg at home against Porto, the game ended with a 1–1 draw. Basel were knocked out of the competition after losing 4–0 in the second leg. At the end of the 2014–15 season, Basel won the championship for the sixth time in a row. In the 2014–15 Swiss Cup Basel reached the final. However for the third time in a row they finished as runners-up.

On 30 July 2015 Basel announced that González was leaving the club and had signed a five-year contract with Dynamo Kyiv. During his one season with the team, González played a total of 47 games for Basel scoring a total of seven goals. 26 of these games were in the Swiss Super League, two in the Swiss Cup, eight in the Champions League and 11 were friendly games. He scored three goals in the domestic league, three in the European games and the other was scored during the test games.

=== Dynamo Kyiv ===
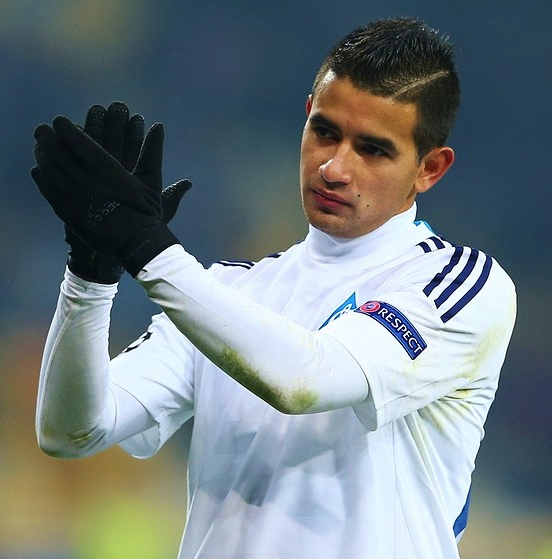
González with Dynamo Kyiv in 2015

On 30 July 2015, González signed a five-year contract with Ukrainian champions FC Dynamo Kyiv. Upon his signing, he became the second most expensive Paraguayan player and the second Paraguayan to play in Ukraine after Pedro Benítez (at Shakhtar Donetsk from 2004 to 2005).

On 22 August 2015, González made his official debut for Dynamo in a 0–6 away win in the 1/16 stage of the Ukrainian Cup against a Ukrainian First League team FC Hirnyk-Sport Komsomolsk, coming on as 45th-minute substitute. He scored his first goal for the club on 4 October, in a 4–0 away win against Vorskla Poltava in the Ukrainian Premier League.

==== Loan to Santos ====
On 31 July 2018, González agreed to a two-year loan deal with Santos. He made his debut for the club on 4 August, replacing Bruno Henrique late into a 0–0 away draw against Botafogo.

On 6 February 2020, González's loan was cut short.

=== Olimpia ===
On 7 February 2020, González returned to Paraguay joining Club Olimpia and signing a five-year contract.

== International career ==
González represented Paraguay at under-15 and the under-20 levels, playing for the latter at the 2013 FIFA U-20 World Cup held in Turkey; at that tournament he scored the winning goal in a match against Mexico.

González made his debut for the senior team in a friendly match against Costa Rica on 26 March 2014, replacing Pablo Velázquez after 58 minutes. In November of the same year, he scored his first senior international goal with a penalty kick in a 2–1 defeat of Peru.

On 28 May 2015, González was included in Paraguay's 23-man squad for the 2015 Copa América by coach Ramón Díaz. He appeared as a half-time substitute in the team's opening fixture against Argentina, helping Paraguay recover from a two-goal deficit to draw 2–2 in La Serena. On 27 June, after Thiago Silva's handball, he scored a penalty in the quarter-final against Brazil in Concepción to level the score at 1–1; in the resulting penalty shootout, he converted the winning kick to take Paraguay to the semi-final.

During match day one of the 2018 FIFA World Cup qualification (CONMEBOL) on 8 October 2015 González scored the winning goal in the 85 minute as Paraguay beat Venezuela 1–0.

== Career statistics ==
=== Club ===
As of match played 3 June 2024

Appearances and goals by club, season and competition
Club	Season	League			Cup		Continental		Other		Total	
Club	Season	Division	Apps	Goals	Apps	Goals	Apps	Goals	Apps	Goals	Apps	Goals
Rubio Ñú	2009	Paraguayan Primera División	1	0	—		—		—		1	0
Rubio Ñú	2010	Paraguayan Primera División	15	2	—		—		—		15	2
Rubio Ñú	2011	Paraguayan Primera División	22	4	—		—		—		22	4
Rubio Ñú	2012	Paraguayan Primera División	13	2	—		—		—		13	2
Rubio Ñú	Total		51	8	—		—		—		51	8
Guaraní (loan)	2013	Paraguayan Primera División	32	14	—		4 (Note: Appearance(s) in Copa Sudamericana)	1	—		36	15
Olimpia	2014	Paraguayan Primera División	20	9	—		—		—		20	9
Basel	2014–15	Swiss Super League	26	3	2	0	8 (Note: Appearance(s) in UEFA Champions League)	3	—		36	6
Dynamo Kyiv	2015–16	Ukrainian Premier League	14	2	4	0	8	1	—		26	3
Dynamo Kyiv	2016–17	Ukrainian Premier League	18	3	2	2	5	1	1 (Note: Appearance in Ukrainian Super Cup)	0	26	6
Dynamo Kyiv	2017–18	Ukrainian Premier League	18	2	2	0	12 (Note: Two appearances in UEFA Champions League, ten appearances and one goal in UEFA Europa League)	1	1	0	33	3
Dynamo Kyiv	Total		50	7	8	2	25	3	2	0	85	14
Santos (loan)	2018	Série A	16	1	0	0	2 (Note: Appearance(s) in Copa Libertadores)	0	—		18	1
Santos (loan)	2019	Série A	15	1	7	2	2	0	11 (Note: Appearance(s) in Campeonato Paulista)	5	35	8
Santos (loan)	2020	Série A	0	0	0	0	0	0	1	0	1	0
Santos (loan)	Total		31	2	7	2	4	0	12	5	54	9
Olimpia	2020	Paraguayan Primera División	15	7	—		5	0	—		20	7
Olimpia	2021	Paraguayan Primera División	21	6	—		6	2	1 (Note: Appearance in Supercopa Paraguay)	0	28	8
Olimpia	2022	Paraguayan Primera División	32	18	—		14 (Note: Two appearances and one goal in Copa Sudamericana and twelve appearances and one goal in Copa Libertadores)	2	1 (Note: Appearance in Supercopa Paraguay)	0	47	20
Olimpia	2023	Paraguayan Primera División	17	4	—		2	0	—		19	4
Olimpia	2024	Paraguayan Primera División	17	4	—		0	0	—		17	4
Olimpia	Total		102	39	—		27	2	2	0	131	41
Career total			312	82	17	4	68	9	16	5	413	100

=== International ===
As of match played 31 August 2022

Appearances and goals by national team and year
National team	Year	Apps	Goals
Paraguay	2014	8	1
Paraguay	2015	10	2
Paraguay	2016	8	1
Paraguay	2017	2	0
Paraguay	2018	2	0
Paraguay	2019	13	3
Paraguay	2022	7	2
Total		50	9

Scores and results list Paraguay's goal tally first, score column indicates score after each González goal.

List of international goals scored by Derlis González
No.	Date	Venue	Opponent	Score	Result	Competition
1	14 November 2014	Estadio Feliciano Cáceres, Luque, Paraguay	Peru	2–1	2–1	Friendly
2	27 June 2015	Estadio Municipal de Concepción, Concepción, Chile	Brazil	1–1	1–1 (4–3 p)	2015 Copa América
3	8 October 2015	Estadio Cachamay, Ciudad Guayana, Venezuela	Venezuela	1–0	1–0	2018 FIFA World Cup qualification
4	11 October 2016	Estadio Mario Alberto Kempes, Córdoba, Argentina	Argentina	1–0	1–0	2018 FIFA World Cup qualification
5	26 March 2019	Levi's Stadium, Santa Clara, United States	Mexico	2–3	2–4	Friendly
6	9 June 2019	Estadio Defensores del Chaco, Asunción, Paraguay	Guatemala	2–0	2–0	Friendly
7	16 June 2019	Estádio do Maracanã, Rio de Janeiro, Brazil	Qatar	2–0	2–2	2019 Copa América
8	2 June 2022	Sapporo Dome, Sapporo, Japan	Japan	1–2	1–4	2022 Kirin Challenge Cup
9	31 August 2022	Mercedes-Benz Stadium, Atlanta, United States	Mexico	1–0	1–0	Friendly

== Honours ==
Basel

- Swiss Super League: 2014–15
- Swiss Cup runner-up: 2014–15

Dynamo Kyiv

- Ukrainian Premier League: 2015–16
- Ukrainian Super Cup: 2016

Individual

- Paraguayan Footballer of the Year (ABC Color vote): 2015

== See also ==
- Players and Records in Paraguayan Football
