= Jorge Recalde (footballer) =

Paraguayan footballer (born 1992)

Personal information
- Full name: Jorge Eduardo Recalde Ramírez
- Date of birth: 8 May 1992 (age 34)
- Place of birth: Asunción, Paraguay
- Height: 1.79 m (5 ft 10 in)
- Positions: Attacking midfielder; right midfielder

Team information
- Current team: Club Libertad
- Number: 19

Youth career
- 2006–2007: Club 31 de Julio
- 2008–2011: Libertad

Senior career*
| Years | Team | Apps | (Gls) |
| 2012–2019 | Libertad | 169 | (42) |
| 2020–2023 | Olimpia | 53 | (25) |
| 2023 | Newell's Old Boys | 39 | (7) |
| 2024–2025 | Ceará | 36 | (5) |
| 2025– | Libertad | 3 | (0) |

International career^{‡}
| 2010 | Paraguay U20 | 7 | (2) |
| 2014– | Paraguay | 2 | (0) |
- * Club domestic league appearances and goals as of 24 November 2024 ‡ National team caps and goals as of 1 July 2017

Jorge Eduardo Recalde Ramírez (born 8 May 1992) is a Paraguayan professional footballer who plays as an attacking midfielder for Libertad.

== Career ==
Recalde debuted in the senior team in a friendly match against Costa Rica national team in March 2014.

== Career statistics ==
As of 2 October 2020

Appearances and goals by club, season and competition
| Club | Season | League | | | Cup | | Continental | | Other | | Total | |
| Club | Season | Division | Apps | Goals | Apps | Goals | Apps | Goals | Apps | Goals | Apps | Goals |
|---|---|---|---|---|---|---|---|---|---|---|---|---|
| Libertad | 2012 | Paraguayan Primera División | 1 | 0 | — | | — | | — | | 1 | 0 |
| Libertad | 2013 | Paraguayan Primera División | 20 | 4 | — | | 10 (Note: Appearance(s) in Copa Sudamericana) | 1 | — | | 30 | 5 |
| Libertad | 2014 | Paraguayan Primera División | 34 | 8 | — | | 4 | 0 | — | | 38 | 8 |
| Libertad | 2015 | Paraguayan Primera División | 37 | 11 | — | | 12 (Note: Six appearances in Copa Libertadores, six appearances in Copa Sudamericana with a goal in both) | 2 | — | | 49 | 13 |
| Libertad | 2016 | Paraguayan Primera División | 19 | 5 | — | | — | | — | | 19 | 5 |
| Libertad | 2017 | Paraguayan Primera División | 30 | 6 | — | | 10 (Note: Eight appearances, one goal in Copa Sudamericana; two appearances in Copa Libertadores) | 1 | — | | 40 | 7 |
| Libertad | 2018 | Paraguayan Primera División | 12 | 2 | — | | — | | — | | 12 | 2 |
| Libertad | 2019 | Paraguayan Primera División | 16 | 6 | — | | 8 (Note: Appearance(s) in Copa Libertadores) | 2 | — | | 24 | 8 |
| Libertad | Total | | 169 | 42 | 0 | 0 | 44 | 6 | 0 | 0 | 213 | 48 |
| Olimpia | 2020 | Paraguayan Primera División | 9 | 7 | — | | 2 | 2 | — | | 11 | 9 |
| Career total | | | 178 | 49 | 0 | 0 | 46 | 8 | 0 | 0 | 224 | 57 |

== Honours ==
Libertad

- Paraguayan Primera División: 2014 Apertura, 2014 Clausura, 2016 Apertura, 2017 Apertura
- Copa Paraguay: 2019

Olimpia

- Paraguayan Primera División: 2020 Clausura, 2022 Clausura
- Copa Paraguay: 2021
- Supercopa Paraguay: 2021

Ceará

- Campeonato Cearense: 2024, 2025
