= Jean (footballer, born 1972) =

Brazilian footballer

Personal information
- Full name: Jean Paulo Fernandes
- Date of birth: 1 October 1972 (age 54)
- Place of birth: Guarujá, Brazil
- Height: 1.90 m (6 ft 3 in)
- Position: Goalkeeper

Youth career
- 1992–1993: Bahia

Senior career*
| Years | Team | Apps | (Gls) |
| 1993 | Fluminense de Feira | | |
| 1994–1996 | Bahia | 68 | (0) |
| 1997 | Cruzeiro | | |
| 1998 | Bahia | | |
| 1998 | Flamengo | 3 | (0) |
| 1999–2002 | Vitória | 54 | (0) |
| 2002–2005 | Guarani | 76 | (0) |
| 2006 | Ponte Preta | 26 | (0) |
| 2007 | Corinthians | | |
| 2008 | Santa Cruz | | |
| 2009 | Madre de Deus | | |
| 2011 | Itabuna | | |
- * Club domestic league appearances and goals

Jean Paulo Fernandes or simply Jean (born 1 October 1972), is a Brazilian retired footballer who played as a goalkeeper. He was born in Guarujá, São Paulo.

His son, also named Jean, is a footballer and a goalkeeper. He too was groomed in Bahia's youth setup.

== Honours ==
Bahia

- Campeonato Baiano: 1994, 1998, 1999

Cruzeiro

- Campeonato Mineiro: 1997
- Copa Libertadores: 1997

Vitória

- Campeonato Baiano: 1999, 2000, 2002
