= Jean (footballer, born October 1995) =

Brazilian footballer

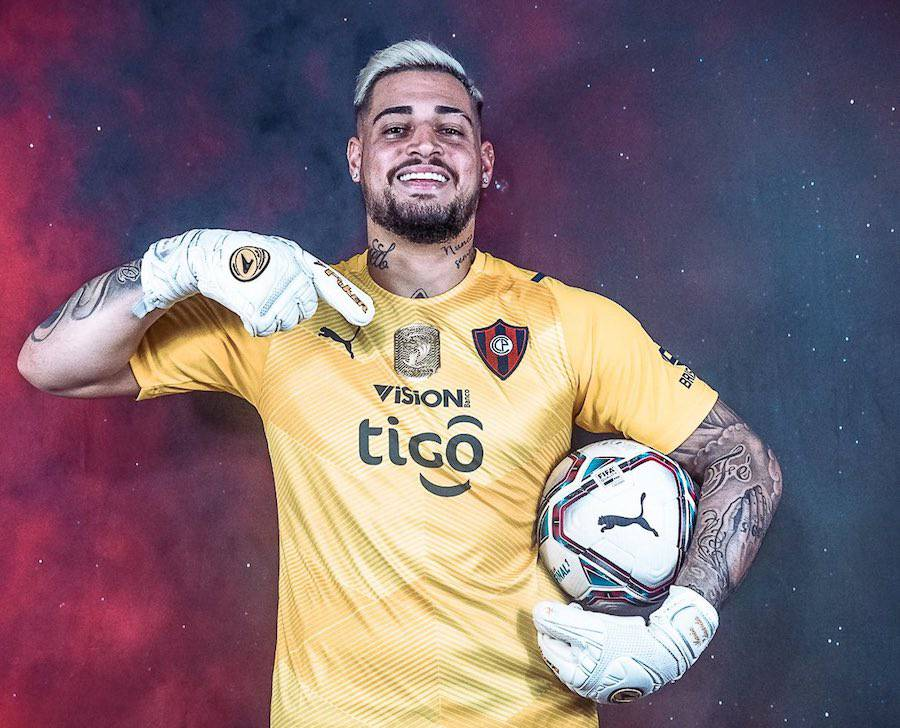
- Jean playing for Cerro Porteño.

Personal information
- Full name: Jean Paulo Fernandes Filho
- Date of birth: 26 October 1995 (age 31)
- Place of birth: Salvador, Brazil
- Height: 1.88 m (6 ft 2 in)
- Position: Goalkeeper

Team information
- Current team: Cerro Porteño
- Number: 13

Youth career
- 2011–2015: Bahia

Senior career*
Years	Team	Apps	(Gls)
2015–2017	Bahia	58	(0)
2018–2022	São Paulo	15	(0)
2020–2021	→ Atlético Goianiense (loan)	41	(5)
2021	→ Cerro Porteño (loan)	17	(0)
2022–	Cerro Porteño	166	(0)

International career
2015	Brazil U20	6	(0)
- * Club domestic league appearances and goals as of 1 September 2024

Jean Paulo Fernandes Filho (born 26 October 1995), simply known as Jean, is a Brazilian professional footballer who plays as a goalkeeper for Liga Dimayor club América de Cali.

== Club career ==
=== Bahia ===
Born in Salvador, Bahia, Jean graduated with Bahia's youth setup, being promoted to the main squad in 2015. In February 2015 he was elected as first-choice, profiting from an injury crisis in the squad, and signed a new three-year deal with the club late in the month.

Jean made his professional debut on 9 May 2015, starting in a 1–1 away draw against América Mineiro for the Série B championship. Mainly a backup during the club's promotion campaign, he only featured in three league matches during that year.

Jean became an undisputed starter during the 2017 season, and made his Série A debut on 14 May 2017 in a 6–2 home routing of Atlético Paranaense. He featured in all 38 league matches of the tournament, as his side finished in a mid-table position.

=== São Paulo ===
On 22 December 2017, Jean agreed to a five-year contract with fellow top tier club São Paulo. On 9 January 2020, the player had his contract suspended until the end of the year following an accusation of violence against his wife the previous month.

==== Atlético Goianiense (loan) ====
On 13 January 2020, Jean was loaned to fellow top tier club Atlético Goianiense. On 13 September, he scored the first goal of his career in a 1–0 Série A win at Bahia, volleying a rebound off the wall from a free kick he himself had taken. He scored a further five times during that season, all of which from penalty kicks. On 27 February 2021, he won the 2020 Campeonato Goiano title.

==== Cerro Porteño (loan) ====
On 27 March 2021, Jean joined Paraguayan Primera División club Cerro Porteño on loan until December. Fernandes joined the club in replacement of Cerro Porteno's first choice goalkeeper, the Uruguayan - Paraguayan Rodrigo Muñoz, who was injured. Upon arrival, Fernandes was only able to play games in the 2021 Copa Libertadores.

== International career ==
On 15 May 2015 Jean was included in Brazil under-20s' final list ahead of that year's FIFA U-20 World Cup.

== Career statistics ==
As of 21 November 2024

Appearances and goals by club, season and competition
Club	Season	League			State League		Cup		Continental		Other		Total	
Club	Season	Division	Apps	Goals	Apps	Goals	Apps	Goals	Apps	Goals	Apps	Goals	Apps	Goals
Bahia	2015	Série B	2	0	9	0	—		—		5 (Note: Appearance(s) in Copa do Nordeste)	0	16	0
Bahia	2016	Série B	3	0	0	0	0	0	—		1	0	4	0
Bahia	2017	Série A	38	0	6	0	2	0	—		10	0	56	0
Bahia	Total		43	0	15	0	2	0	—		16	0	76	0
São Paulo	2018	Série A	10	0	4	0	2	0	2 (Note: Appearance(s) in Copa Sudamericana)	0	—		18	0
São Paulo	2019	Série A	0	0	1	0	0	0	0	0	—		1	0
São Paulo	Total		10	0	5	0	2	0	2	0	—		19	0
Atlético Goianiense (loan)	2020	Série A	36	5	5	0	5	1	—		—		46	6
Cerro Porteño (loan)	2021	Paraguayan Primera División	17	0	—		—		8	0	0	0	25	0
Cerro Porteño	2022	Paraguayan Primera División	37	0	—		—		8	0	—		45	0
Cerro Porteño	2023	Paraguayan Primera División	40	0	—		2	0	8	0	—		50	0
Cerro Porteño	2024	Paraguayan Primera División	38	0	—		2	0	7	0	—		47	0
Cerro Porteño	Total		132	0	—		4	0	31	0	—		167	0
Career total			221	5	25	0	13	1	33	0	16	0	308	6

== List of goals scored ==
Following, is the list with the goals scored by Jean:

#	Date	Venue	Host team	Result	Away team	Competition	Score	Type	Opponent goalkeeper
1	13 September 2020	Estádio de Pituaçu, Salvador	Bahia	0–1	Atlético Goianiense	Campeonato Brasileiro	0–1	Free kick (rebound)	Douglas
2	28 October 2020	Estádio Olímpico Pedro Ludovico, Goiânia	Atlético Goianiense	1–2	Internacional	Copa do Brasil	1–2	Penalty kick	Marcelo Lomba
3	12 December 2020	Estádio Castelão, Fortaleza	Ceará	1–2	Atlético Goianiense	Campeonato Brasileiro	1–1	Penalty kick	Richard
4	16 December 2020	Estádio Antônio Accioly, Goiânia	Atlético Goianiense	2–1	Fluminense	Campeonato Brasileiro	2–0	Penalty kick	Marcos Felipe
5	24 January 2021	Estádio Antônio Accioly, Goiânia	Atlético Goianiense	2–0	Fortaleza	Campeonato Brasileiro	1–0	Penalty kick	Felipe Alves
6	6 February 2021	Estádio Antônio Accioly, Goiânia	Atlético Goianiense	1–1	Santos	Campeonato Brasileiro	1–0	Penalty kick	João Paulo

== Personal life ==
Jean's father, also named Jean, was also a footballer and a goalkeeper. He too was groomed at Bahia.

== Honours ==
Bahia

- Copa do Nordeste: 2017

Atlético Goianiense

- Campeonato Goiano: 2020

Cerro Porteño

- Paraguayan Primera División: 2021 (clausura)
