= David Ariel Mendieta =

Paraguayan footballer (born 1986)

David Mendieta
Personal information
- Full name: David Ariel Mendieta Chávez
- Date of birth: 22 August 1986 (age 40)
- Place of birth: Lambaré, Paraguay
- Height: 1.73 m (5 ft 8 in)
- Position: Attacking midfielder

Team information
- Current team: 12 de Octubre
- Number: 8

Youth career
- 2002–2005: Guarani

Senior career*
Years	Team	Apps	(Gls)
2005–2007	Guarani	10	(1)
2007–2008	Sport Colombia	23	(5)
2009–2010	12 de Octubre	30	(3)
2011	Guarani	17	(0)
2012	San Lorenzo	20	(2)
2013–2014	3 de Febrero		
2015	Deportivo Cali	18	(1)
2015	Sportivo Luqueño	15	(1)
2016	Libertad	5	(0)
2016	Sportivo Luqueño	11	(1)
2017	Deportivo Capiatá	27	(2)
2018	Libertad	15	(3)
2018	Independiente	19	(4)
2019	3 de Febrero		
2020–	12 de Octubre	7	(0)

International career
2014	Paraguay	3	(0)
- * Club domestic league appearances and goals as of 20:24, 31 May 2020 (UTC)

David Ariel Mendieta Chávez (born 22 August 1986) is a Paraguayan footballer who plays for 12 de Octubre in the Paraguayan Primera División.

== Career ==
=== 3 de Febrero ===
Tigo Sports Paraguay claimed that Mendieta was the best player at 3 de Febrero in the 2014 Primera División Paraguaya season. It seemed that he was about to sign with Sportivo Luqueño, but a good offer from Colombian football took him to Deportivo Cali.

=== Deportivo Cali ===
In 2015, Mendieta was presented as the new Deportivo Cali player and he was issued the number 10 jersey. During the 2015 pre-season, Mendieta had good performances in friendly matches, convincing the coach Fernando Castro who praised him in manifesting that Mendieta complies 1, 000%.

=== Sportivo Luqueño ===
In July 2015, Mendieta joined Primera División Paraguaya club Sportivo Luqueño for six months and having the opportunity to dispute the Copa Sudamericana.

== International career ==
In May 2014, Mendieta made his international debut against Cameroon. His following game was against France. In August 2014, Mendieta was selected by coach Victor Genes for the Paraguay national team for a friendly.
