= Badayco Maciel =

Paraguayan football manager (born 1981)

Personal information
- Full name: Badayco Jorge Crispín Maciel
- Date of birth: 23 April 1981 (age 45)
- Place of birth: Las Palmas, Spain
- Height: 1.90 m (6 ft 3 in)
- Position: Midfielder

Senior career*
Years	Team	Apps	(Gls)
2001–2003	Valladolid B		
2003	Sport Colombia		
2004	Olimpia	7	(0)
2005	General Caballero	1	(0)
2006–2007	Fernando de la Mora	10	(1)
Total		18	(1)

Managerial career
- 2012: Sportivo Trinidense
- 2012–2018: Deportivo Capiatá (youth)
- 2019: Sportivo Iteño (assistant)
- 2019: Sportivo Iteño
- 2020–2021: Sportivo Luqueño (youth)
- 2021: Sportivo Luqueño
- 2023: Tacuary (interim)
- * Club domestic league appearances and goals

Badayco Jorge Crispín Maciel (born 23 April 1981) is a Paraguayan football manager and former midfielder.

== Career ==
Born in Las Palmas, Canary Islands, Maciel played for Real Valladolid in his birth nation before moving to Paraguay, where he represented Sport Colombia, Olimpia, General Caballero and Fernando de la Mora. After retiring, he worked as a youth coach at Deportivo Capiatá.

In February 2019, Maciel was presented as Sportivo Iteño's assistant. He was later appointed manager before being sacked in October, and later joined Sportivo Luqueño's youth categories.

On 13 September 2021, Maciel was named interim manager of Luqueño after Alfredo Berti was sacked. Seven days later, he became the official manager.

On 29 March 2023, Maciel was presented as interim manager of Tacuary.

== Personal life ==
Maciel's father Crispín was also a footballer. A forward, he spent the most of his career in Spain.
