= Enzo Giménez =

Paraguayan footballer

Personal information
- Full name: Enzo Daniel Giménez Rojas
- Date of birth: 17 February 1998 (age 28)
- Place of birth: Luque, Paraguay
- Height: 1.78 m (5 ft 10 in)
- Positions: Full back; central midfielder

Team information
- Current team: Querétaro
- Number: 16

Youth career
- Club General Díaz (Luque)

Senior career*
Years	Team	Apps	(Gls)
2017–2020	Club General Díaz (Luque)	84	(12)
2020–2025	Cerro Porteño	148	(10)
2025–2026	Rosario Central	41	(3)
2026–	Querétaro	9	(0)
- * Club domestic league appearances and goals as of 18:16, 4 October 2026 (UTC)

Enzo Daniel Giménez Rojas (born 17 February 1998) is a Paraguayan professional footballer who plays as a right midfielder for Liga MX club Querétaro.

== Early life and youth career ==
Giménez was born in Luque, Paraguay. He began his football career with Club General Díaz, where he progressed through the youth ranks.

== Club career ==
=== General Díaz ===
Giménez made his professional debut with the club from the neighbourhood of General Díaz, called Club General Díaz, in 2016, where he played until 2019. During his tenure, he made significant contributions to the team's midfield.

=== Cerro Porteño ===
In 2020, Giménez transferred to Cerro Porteño, one of Paraguay's most prominent clubs. Over five seasons, he was instrumental in securing two league titles: the Apertura 2020 and Clausura 2021. His versatility allowed him to play as a right midfielder and occasionally as a central midfielder.

=== Rosario Central ===
On 13 January 2025, Giménez joined Rosario Central in Argentina on a free transfer after his contract with Cerro Porteño ended. He was welcomed as a valuable addition to the squad led by coach Ariel Holan.

=== Querétaro ===
On July 11, 2026, he was announced as a new player for the Mexican football club Querétaro, that plays in Liga BBVA MX, in the frist national tier, signing a contract valid until June 30, 2030.

== International career ==
Giménez represented Paraguay at the U-23 level, participating in the 2020 CONMEBOL Pre-Olympic Tournament in Colombia. His performances at the club level have positioned him as a potential candidate for future call-ups to the senior national team.

== Honours ==
Cerro Porteño

- Paraguayan Primera División: Apertura 2020, Clausura 2021

Rosario Central

- Primera División: 2025 Liga
