= Robert Pereira =

Paraguayan football manager

Personal information
- Full name: Robert Pereira Molina
- Date of birth: 30 May 1968 (age 58)
- Place of birth: Paraguay

Managerial career
- Years: Team
- 2013: Fernando de la Mora (assistant)
- 2013–2016: Fernando de la Mora
- 2016–2017: General Caballero ZC
- 2018: Sportivo Iteño
- 2018: Tacuary
- 2019: Rubio Ñu
- 2020: General Díaz
- 2021: Sportivo Iteño
- 2022: Tacuary
- 2022: 12 de Octubre
- 2022–2023: Tacuary
- 2023: Sportivo San Lorenzo
- 2024: Tacuary

Robert Pereira Molina (born 30 May 1968) is a Paraguayan football manager.

== Career ==
Pereira was an assistant of Jorge Amado Nunes at Fernando de la Mora in 2013, before being named manager of the club September of that year. He resigned in July 2016, and took over Primera División side General Caballero de Zeballos Cué.

Despite the club's relegation, Pereira remained in charge in 2017 but was replaced by Roberto Sánchez. Ahead of the 2018 season, he was named in charge of Sportivo Iteño, but ended the campaign at Tacuary.

On 8 January 2019, Pereira was appointed Rubio Ñu manager. In June 2020, he was named at the helm of General Díaz, but was sacked on 6 October.

Pereira was named manager of Iteño in June 2021, but left in the following month. On 21 February 2022, he replaced Daniel Lanata at the helm of Tacuary, now in the top tier, but resigned on 1 May.

On 3 June 2022, Pereira was named manager of 12 de Octubre also in the first division. Sacked on 21 August, he returned to Tacuary on 12 October, but was also dismissed on 3 February 2023.
