= Diego Godoy =

Paraguayan footballer (born 1992)

Personal information
- Full name: Diego Armando Godoy Vázquez
- Date of birth: 1 April 1992 (age 34)
- Place of birth: Asunción, Paraguay
- Height: 1.74 m (5 ft 8 1/2 in)
- Position: Midfielder

Team information
- Current team: Tacuary
- Number: 6

Senior career*
| Years | Team | Apps | (Gls) |
| 2010–2015 | Cerro Porteño | 27 | (2) |
| 2011 | → Rubio Ñu (loan) | 19 | (1) |
| 2012 | → Luqueño (loan) | 18 | (3) |
| 2013 | → Carapeguá (loan) | 17 | (1) |
| 2015 | → Capiatá (loan) | 6 | (0) |
| 2015–2017 | Rubio Ñu | 36 | (9) |
| 2016–2017 | → Unión Santa Fe (loan) | 17 | (4) |
| 2018–2019 | General Díaz | 38 | (4) |
| 2020 | Millonarios | 18 | (0) |
| 2021 | River Plate | 9 | (1) |
| 2021 | Sol de América | 6 | (0) |
| 2022 | Guaireña | 28 | (3) |
| 2023 | Resistencia | 15 | (0) |
| 2023 | Guaireña | 15 | (1) |
| 2024 | Resistencia | 14 | (0) |
| 2024 | 12 de Junio | 8 | (2) |
| 2025– | Tacuary | 10 | (4) |
- * Club domestic league appearances and goals as of 26 May 2025

Diego Armando Godoy Vázquez (born 1 April 1992) is a Paraguayan professional footballer who plays as a midfielder for Tacuary.

== Career ==
Godoy's career started with Paraguayan Primera División side Cerro Porteño in 2010. He remained with the team for five years whilst making 27 appearances and scoring 2 goals, but most of his time with Cerro Porteño was spent out on loan. Firstly, Godoy joined Rubio Ñu and went on to play 19 times and score once. Loans to Sportivo Luqueño and Carapeguá followed before a final one to Capiatá, after 41 league appearances with those three aforementioned sides he left parent club Cerro Porteño to join his first loan team, Rubio Ñu, in 2015.

His permanent debut for Rubio Ñu came on 30 January in a 3–1 defeat against Sol de América. In his first full season with the team, 2016, Godoy scored 8 goals in 20 appearances including a brace versus Nacional. On 21 July 2016, Godoy joined Argentine Primera División side Unión Santa Fe on loan. He returned to Rubio Ñu at the end of 2016–17, he made nineteen appearances and scored four times in total for Unión. In January 2018, Godoy signed for General Díaz. Two years later, Godoy headed to Colombia with Millonarios. He made his bow on 31 January 2020 against Cúcuta Deportivo.

== Career statistics ==
As of 10 July 2020.

Club statistics
| Club | Season | League | | | Cup | | League Cup | | Continental | | Other | | Total | |
| Club | Season | Division | Apps | Goals | Apps | Goals | Apps | Goals | Apps | Goals | Apps | Goals | Apps | Goals |
|---|---|---|---|---|---|---|---|---|---|---|---|---|---|---|
| Cerro Porteño | 2010 | Paraguayan Primera División | 1 | 0 | — | | — | | 0 | 0 | 0 | 0 | 1 | 0 |
| Cerro Porteño | 2011 | Paraguayan Primera División | 4 | 0 | — | | — | | 0 | 0 | 0 | 0 | 4 | 0 |
| Cerro Porteño | 2012 | Paraguayan Primera División | 0 | 0 | — | | — | | 0 | 0 | 0 | 0 | 0 | 0 |
| Cerro Porteño | 2013 | Paraguayan Primera División | 6 | 1 | — | | — | | 0 | 0 | 0 | 0 | 6 | 1 |
| Cerro Porteño | 2014 | Paraguayan Primera División | 16 | 1 | — | | — | | 4 (Note: Appearance(s) in the Copa Libertadores) | 0 | 0 | 0 | 20 | 1 |
| Cerro Porteño | 2015 | Paraguayan Primera División | 0 | 0 | — | | — | | 0 | 0 | 0 | 0 | 0 | 0 |
| Cerro Porteño | Total | | 27 | 2 | — | | — | | 4 | 0 | 0 | 0 | 31 | 2 |
| Rubio Ñu (loan) | 2011 | Paraguayan Primera División | 19 | 1 | — | | — | | — | | 0 | 0 | 19 | 1 |
| Sportivo Luqueño (loan) | 2012 | Paraguayan Primera División | 18 | 3 | — | | — | | — | | 0 | 0 | 18 | 3 |
| Carapeguá (loan) | 2013 | Paraguayan Primera División | 17 | 1 | — | | — | | — | | 0 | 0 | 17 | 1 |
| Capiatá (loan) | 2015 | Paraguayan Primera División | 6 | 0 | — | | — | | — | | 0 | 0 | 6 | 0 |
| Rubio Ñu | 2015 | Paraguayan Primera División | 5 | 1 | — | | — | | — | | 0 | 0 | 5 | 1 |
| Rubio Ñu | 2016 | Paraguayan Primera División | 20 | 8 | — | | — | | — | | 0 | 0 | 20 | 8 |
| Rubio Ñu | 2017 | Paraguayan Primera División | 11 | 0 | — | | — | | — | | 0 | 0 | 11 | 0 |
| Rubio Ñu | Total | | 36 | 9 | — | | — | | — | | 0 | 0 | 36 | 9 |
| Unión Santa Fe (loan) | 2016–17 | Argentine Primera División | 17 | 4 | 2 | 0 | — | | — | | 0 | 0 | 19 | 4 |
| General Díaz | 2018 | Paraguayan Primera División | 7 | 0 | 0 | 0 | — | | 1 (Note: Appearance(s) in the Copa Sudamericana) | 0 | 0 | 0 | 8 | 0 |
| General Díaz | 2019 | Paraguayan Primera División | 31 | 4 | 0 | 0 | — | | 0 | 0 | 0 | 0 | 31 | 4 |
| General Díaz | Total | | 38 | 4 | 0 | 0 | — | | 1 | 0 | 0 | 0 | 39 | 4 |
| Millonarios | 2020 | Categoría Primera A | 5 | 0 | 0 | 0 | — | | 2 | 0 | 0 | 0 | 7 | 0 |
| Career total | | | 183 | 24 | 2 | 0 | — | | 7 | 0 | 0 | 0 | 192 | 24 |

== Honours ==
Cerro Porteño

- Paraguayan Primera División: 2013 Clausura
