= 2021 APF División de Honor =

Primera División
- Season: 2021
- Dates: 5 February – 5 December 2021
- Champions: Apertura: Libertad (21st title); Clausura: Cerro Porteño (34th title)
- Relegated: Sportivo Luqueño; River Plate
- Copa Libertadores: Cerro Porteño; Libertad; Guaraní; Olimpia
- Copa Sudamericana: Nacional; Guaireña; Sol de América (via Copa Paraguay)
- Matches: 180
- Goals: 456 (2.53 per match)
- Top goalscorer: Apertura: Leonardo Villagra (10 goals); Clausura: Sebastián Ferreira and Lorenzo Melgarejo (9 goals each)
- Biggest home win: Libertad 5–0 Sportivo Luqueño (29 August); Libertad 5–0 River Plate (3 December)
- Biggest away win: 12 de Octubre 0–5 Sol de América (20 February); Guaraní 1–6 Libertad (16 May)
- Highest scoring: Guaraní 1–6 Libertad (16 May)

The 2021 División Profesional season (officially the Copa de Primera TIGO-Visión Banco 2021 for sponsorship reasons) was the 87th season of the Paraguayan Primera División, the top-flight professional football league in Paraguay. The season began on 5 February and ended on 5 December 2021. The fixtures for the season were announced on 15 January 2021. Olimpia were the defending champions after winning the 2020 Clausura tournament.

In the Torneo Apertura, Libertad secured their twenty-first league title with one match to spare following Nacional's loss to River Plate on 23 May, whilst in the Torneo Clausura Cerro Porteño won their thirty-fourth league title after drawing with eventual runners-up Guaraní 2–2 on the last matchday played on 4 December.

== Teams ==
Ten teams competed in the season: the top ten teams in the relegation table of the previous season, with no teams promoted from the División Intermedia since the 2020 seasons of the lower-tier club tournaments of Paraguayan football were cancelled by the Paraguayan Football Association due to the COVID-19 pandemic. General Díaz and San Lorenzo were both relegated to the second tier at the end of the previous season after eight and two years in the top flight, respectively.

=== Stadia and locations ===
Locations of the 2021 Primera División teams

Team	Manager	City	Stadium (Note: Teams occasionally play their home matches at Estadio Defensores del Chaco in Asunción. Derbies between Cerro Porteño and Olimpia are also played at this stadium.)	Capacity
12 de Octubre	(Paraguay) Pedro Sarabia	Itauguá	Luis Alberto Salinas	10,000
Cerro Porteño	(Paraguay) Francisco Arce	Asunción	General Pablo Rojas	45,000
Guaireña	(Paraguay) Troadio Duarte	Villarrica	Parque del Guairá	12,000
Guaraní	(Spain) Fernando Jubero	Asunción	Rogelio Livieres	6,000
Libertad	(Argentina) Daniel Garnero	Asunción	Dr. Nicolás Leoz	10,000
Nacional	(Uruguay) Hernán Rodrigo López	Asunción	Arsenio Erico	4,000
Olimpia	(Paraguay) Julio César Cáceres	Asunción	Manuel Ferreira	25,000
River Plate	(Paraguay) Iván Almeida	Asunción	River Plate	6,500
Sol de América	(Argentina) Juan Pablo Pumpido	Villa Elisa	Luis Alfonso Giagni	11,000
Sportivo Luqueño	(Argentina) Miguel Ángel Zahzú	Luque	Feliciano Cáceres	25,000

=== Managerial changes ===
Team	Outgoing manager	Manner of departure	Date of vacancy	Position in table	Incoming manager	Date of appointment
Torneo Apertura
River Plate	(Paraguay) Ariel Galeano	End of caretaker spell	18 December 2020	Pre-season	(Argentina) Mario Jara	21 December 2020
Libertad	(Paraguay) Juan Samudio	End of caretaker spell	23 December 2020	Pre-season	(Argentina) Daniel Garnero	30 December 2020
Sol de América	(Paraguay) Celso Ayala	Sacked	17 February 2021	10th	(Paraguay) Gustavo Florentín	17 February 2021
River Plate	(Argentina) Mario Jara	Resigned	9 March 2021	8th	(Paraguay) Enrique Landaida	10 March 2021
Olimpia	(Argentina) Néstor Gorosito	Sacked	15 March 2021	4th	(Uruguay) Sergio Órteman	15 March 2021
Sol de América	(Paraguay) Gustavo Florentín	Resigned	23 March 2021	8th	(Paraguay) Ever Hugo Almeida	23 March 2021
River Plate	(Paraguay) Enrique Landaida	Sacked	17 April 2021	10th	(Paraguay) Celso Ayala	18 April 2021
Sportivo Luqueño	(Paraguay) Luis Escobar	Sacked	1 May 2021	8th	(Paraguay) Gilberto Fleitas (caretaker)	1 May 2021
Sol de América	(Paraguay) Ever Hugo Almeida	Sacked	3 May 2021	9th	(Paraguay) Iván Almeida (caretaker)	3 May 2021
Sportivo Luqueño	(Paraguay) Gilberto Fleitas	End of caretaker spell	9 May 2021	8th	(Argentina) Alfredo Berti	9 May 2021
Guaraní	(Argentina) Gustavo Costas	Mutual consent	28 May 2021	6th	(Spain) Fernando Jubero	12 June 2021
Torneo Clausura
Sol de América	(Paraguay) Iván Almeida	End of caretaker spell	10 June 2021	Pre-tournament	(Argentina) Juan Pablo Pumpido	10 June 2021
Olimpia	(Uruguay) Sergio Órteman	Resigned	14 August 2021	9th	(Paraguay) Enrique Landaida	15 August 2021
Olimpia	(Paraguay) Enrique Landaida	Change of role	12 September 2021	10th	(Uruguay) Álvaro Gutiérrez	9 September 2021
Sportivo Luqueño	(Argentina) Alfredo Berti	Sacked	12 September 2021	5th	(Spain) Badayco Maciel (Note: Originally as caretaker manager, appointed as manager until the end of the tournament on 20 September 2021.)	13 September 2021
Olimpia	(Uruguay) Álvaro Gutiérrez	Resigned	14 October 2021	10th	(Paraguay) Julio César Cáceres	15 October 2021
River Plate	(Paraguay) Celso Ayala	Sacked	18 October 2021	6th	(Paraguay) Iván Almeida	19 October 2021
Sportivo Luqueño	(Spain) Badayco Maciel	Replaced	7 December 2021	Relegation play-off	(Argentina) Miguel Ángel Zahzú	8 December 2021

== Torneo Apertura ==
The Campeonato de Apertura, named "Centenario del Sportivo Luqueño", was the 123rd official championship of the Primera División and the first championship of the 2021 season. It started on 5 February and ended on 30 May.

=== Standings ===
Pos	Team	Pld	W	D	L	GF	GA	GD	Pts	Qualification
1	Libertad (C)	18	12	2	4	36	15	+21	38	Qualification for Copa Libertadores group stage
2	Olimpia	18	10	3	5	34	23	+11	33	
3	Nacional	18	8	6	4	26	19	+7	30	
4	Cerro Porteño	18	8	4	6	24	22	+2	28	
5	Guaireña	18	6	8	4	20	14	+6	26	
6	Guaraní	18	7	4	7	24	27	−3	25	
7	12 de Octubre	18	5	7	6	20	25	−5	22	
8	Sportivo Luqueño	18	5	3	10	19	29	−10	18	
9	Sol de América	18	3	5	10	18	28	−10	14	
10	River Plate	18	2	6	10	13	32	−19	12	

Source: APF, Soccerway
Rules for classification: 1) Points, 2) Playoff game (only if needed to decide championship between two teams), 3) Goal difference, 4) Goals for, 5) Away goals for, 6) Drawing of lots.
(C) Champions

=== Results ===
Home \ Away	12O	CCP	GFC	GUA	LIB	NAC	OLI	RIV	SOL	SLU
12 de Octubre	—	0–2	1–1	1–1	2–1	2–2	0–2	2–2	0–5	1–0
Cerro Porteño	0–1	—	2–2	2–1	0–3	2–2	2–0	3–0	1–0	1–0
Guaireña	0–0	0–1	—	0–0	1–0	1–0	1–2	0–0	2–2	3–0
Guaraní	2–1	2–0	0–3	—	1–6	2–2	0–3	2–0	2–0	0–1
Libertad	3–1	2–1	2–1	1–1	—	1–1	0–1	2–1	1–2	2–0
Nacional	1–1	2–0	1–3	2–0	0–3	—	2–1	0–1	1–0	1–0
Olimpia	2–2	2–0	0–0	2–1	0–1	1–4	—	5–1	3–3	4–1
River Plate	0–2	1–1	0–1	1–4	1–3	0–0	1–2	—	0–2	1–0
Sol de América	0–3	1–3	0–0	1–3	0–2	1–2	0–2	1–1	—	0–2
Sportivo Luqueño	1–0	3–3	3–1	1–2	1–3	0–3	4–2	2–2	0–0	—

Source: Soccerway
Legend: Blue = home team win; Yellow = draw; Red = away team win.

=== Top scorers ===
Rank	Name	Club	Goals
1	(Paraguay) Leonardo Villagra	Nacional	10
2	(Paraguay) Óscar Cardozo	Libertad	9
3	(Argentina) Mauro Boselli	Cerro Porteño	7
3	(Paraguay) Robert Morales	Cerro Porteño	7
3	(Paraguay) Jorge Recalde	Olimpia	7
6	(Paraguay) Carlos Arrua	Nacional	6
6	(Paraguay) Fernando Fernández	Guaraní	6
6	(Uruguay) Alejandro Silva	Olimpia	6
9	(Paraguay) José Ariel Núñez	12 de Octubre	5
9	(Paraguay) Fernando Romero	Guaireña	5
9	(Paraguay) Pablo Velázquez	12 de Octubre	5
9	(Paraguay) Pablo Zeballos	River Plate	5

Source: Soccerway

== Torneo Clausura ==
The Campeonato de Clausura, named "Homenaje a César Zabala", was the 124th official championship of the Primera División and the second championship of the 2021 season. It began on 16 July and ended on 5 December.

=== Standings ===
Pos	Team	Pld	W	D	L	GF	GA	GD	Pts	Qualification
1	Cerro Porteño (C)	18	11	5	2	27	8	+19	38	Qualification for Copa Libertadores group stage
2	Guaraní	18	10	6	2	39	19	+20	36	
3	Sol de América	18	8	4	6	22	22	0	28	
4	Libertad	18	7	6	5	32	21	+11	27	
5	12 de Octubre	18	5	6	7	18	22	−4	21	
6	Sportivo Luqueño	18	5	6	7	16	27	−11	21	
7	Nacional	18	4	8	6	17	25	−8	20	
8	Olimpia	18	6	0	12	24	29	−5	18	
9	Guaireña	18	4	6	8	12	21	−9	18	
10	River Plate	18	4	5	9	15	28	−13	17	

Source: APF, Soccerway
Rules for classification: 1) Points, 2) Playoff game (only if needed to decide championship between two teams), 3) Goal difference, 4) Goals for, 5) Away goals for, 6) Drawing of lots.
(C) Champions

=== Results ===
Home \ Away	12O	CCP	GFC	GUA	LIB	NAC	OLI	RIV	SOL	SLU
12 de Octubre	—	0–1	0–0	1–2	0–1	2–2	1–3	2–2	1–0	0–1
Cerro Porteño	1–0	—	2–0	0–0	1–1	0–2	1–0	2–0	3–0	0–1
Guaireña	0–1	0–2	—	1–1	2–1	0–0	0–2	1–2	1–1	1–2
Guaraní	4–1	2–2	3–0	—	2–2	1–1	3–1	2–1	3–0	2–1
Libertad	3–3	0–2	0–0	2–0	—	1–2	0–3	5–0	1–1	5–0
Nacional	1–1	1–5	0–2	1–1	1–0	—	1–3	1–1	1–1	0–0
Olimpia	1–2	0–3	0–2	1–3	2–3	1–2	—	1–3	0–1	4–0
River Plate	0–2	0–0	1–1	1–5	0–1	1–0	1–2	—	0–2	0–0
Sol de América	0–1	1–2	3–0	2–1	0–4	3–0	1–0	1–0	—	2–1
Sportivo Luqueño	0–0	0–0	0–1	1–4	2–2	2–1	2–0	0–2	3–3	—

Source: Soccerway
Legend: Blue = home team win; Yellow = draw; Red = away team win.

=== Top scorers ===
Rank	Name	Club	Goals
1	(Paraguay) Sebastián Ferreira	Libertad	9
1	(Paraguay) Lorenzo Melgarejo	Libertad	9
3	(Brazil) Chico	Sol de América	8
4	(Argentina) Claudio Aquino	Cerro Porteño	7
4	(Paraguay) José Florentín	Guaraní	7
4	(Paraguay) José Verdún	Guaireña	7
7	(Paraguay) Enrique Borja	Sportivo Luqueño	6
7	(Paraguay) Robert Morales	Cerro Porteño	6
7	(Paraguay) Alfio Oviedo	Guaraní	6
10	(Paraguay) Hernesto Caballero	River Plate	5
10	(Paraguay) Fernando Fernández	Guaraní	5
10	(Paraguay) Marcelo González	Guaraní	5

Source: Soccerway

== Aggregate table ==
Pos	Team	Pld	W	D	L	GF	GA	GD	Pts	Qualification
1	Cerro Porteño (C)	36	19	9	8	51	30	+21	66	Qualification for Copa Libertadores group stage (Note: Cerro Porteño also qualified for the 2021 Supercopa Paraguay as the best-ranked champions in the aggregate table.)
2	Libertad (C)	36	19	8	9	68	36	+32	65	Qualification for Copa Libertadores group stage
3	Guaraní	36	17	10	9	63	46	+17	61	Qualification for Copa Libertadores second stage
4	Olimpia	36	16	3	17	58	52	+6	51	Qualification for Copa Libertadores first stage
5	Nacional	36	12	14	10	43	44	−1	50	Qualification for Copa Sudamericana first stage
6	Guaireña	36	10	14	12	32	35	−3	44	Qualification for Copa Sudamericana first stage
7	12 de Octubre	36	10	13	13	38	47	−9	43	
8	Sol de América	36	11	9	16	40	50	−10	42	Qualification for Copa Sudamericana first stage (Note: Sol de América qualified for the Copa Sudamericana first stage as 2021 Copa Paraguay runners-up.)
9	Sportivo Luqueño	36	10	9	17	35	56	−21	39	
10	River Plate	36	6	11	19	28	60	−32	29	

Source: APF
Rules for classification: 1) Points, 2) Playoff game (only if needed to decide international qualification between two teams), 3) Goal difference, 4) Goals for, 5) Away goals for, 6) Drawing of lots.
(C) Champions

== Relegation ==
Relegation is determined at the end of the season by computing an average of the number of points earned per game over the past three seasons. The team with the lowest average was relegated to the División Intermedia for the following season, while the team with the second lowest average played a double-legged relegation play-off against the 2021 Intermedia fourth placed team.

=== Relegation table ===
Pos	Team	2019 Pts	2020 Pts	2021 Pts	Total Pts	Total Pld	Avg	Relegation
1	Olimpia	108	62	51	221	113	1.956	
2	Cerro Porteño	80	69	66	215	113	1.903	
3	Libertad	85	62	65	212	113	1.876	
4	Guaraní	69	59	61	189	113	1.673	
5	Nacional	52	44	50	146	113	1.292	
6	Guaireña	—	41	44	85	69	1.232	
7	12 de Octubre	—	41	43	84	69	1.217	
8	Sol de América	57	35	42	134	113	1.186	
9	Sportivo Luqueño (R)	52	36	39	127	113	1.124	Qualification for Relegation play-off
10	River Plate (R)	52	38	29	119	113	1.053	Relegation to División Intermedia

Source: APF

=== Promotion/relegation play-off ===
7 December 2021
19:30 UTC−3

Sportivo Ameliano	3–2	Sportivo Luqueño
Giménez 21', 72'; Arce 63'	Report	Ortiz 17'; Palau 76'

Estadio Defensores del Chaco, Asunción
Referee: Carlos Benítez

11 December 2021
19:30 UTC−3

Sportivo Luqueño	1–1	Sportivo Ameliano
Castro 77'	Report	Giménez 42'

Estadio Defensores del Chaco, Asunción
Referee: Alipio Colmán

Sportivo Ameliano won 4–3 on aggregate and were promoted to Primera División. Sportivo Luqueño were relegated to the División Intermedia.

== Season awards ==
On 14 December 2021 a ceremony was held at the Paraguayan Football Association's headquarters to announce the winners of the season awards (Premios de Primera), who were chosen based on voting by the managers of the 10 Primera División teams, local sports journalists, the APF's Referee Commission, the public as well as official statistics.

Award	Winner	Club
Best Player	(Argentina) Claudio Aquino	Cerro Porteño
Revelation Player	(Paraguay) Julio César Enciso	Libertad
People's Player	(Brazil) Jean Paulo Fernandes	Cerro Porteño
Top Scorer	(Paraguay) Leonardo Villagra (14 goals)	Nacional
Best Goal	(Argentina) Claudio Aquino (against Olimpia, Torneo Clausura Round 14)	Cerro Porteño
Best Goalkeeper	(Brazil) Jean Paulo Fernandes	Cerro Porteño
Best Manager	(Paraguay) Francisco Arce	Cerro Porteño
Fair Play Team	Guaireña	
Best Referee	Giancarlo Juliadoza	
Best VAR Referee	Mario Díaz de Vivar	
