= Iván Almeida =

Paraguayan football manager (1978–2023)

Personal information
- Full name: Ever Iván Almeida Romero
- Date of birth: 22 January 1978
- Place of birth: Asunción, Paraguay
- Date of death: 23 December 2023 (aged 45)
- Height: 1.80 m (5 ft 11 in)
- Position: Goalkeeper

Senior career*
Years	Team	Apps	(Gls)
2005	Olimpia	0	(0)
2006–2007	Sportivo Patria	10	(0)

Managerial career
- 2010–2013: Guatemala (assistant)
- 2013–2014: Olimpia (assistant)
- 2014: Olimpia de Itá
- 2015–2017: Libertad (assistant)
- 2017: Olimpia (reserves)
- 2018: Sportivo Trinidense
- 2019: Resistencia
- 2021: Sol de América (assistant)
- 2021: Sol de América (interim)
- 2021: Olimpia (youth)
- 2021: River Plate Asunción
- 2022: Tacuary
- 2023: Tacuary
- * Club domestic league appearances and goals

Ever Iván Almeida Romero (22 January 1978 – 23 December 2023) was a Paraguayan football manager and player who played as a goalkeeper.

== Career ==
Ever Iván Almeida Romero was born in Asunción, and notably represented Olimpia and Sportivo Patria during his playing career. After retiring, he started working as an assistant coach of his father at the Guatemala national team and Olimpia.

On 22 April 2014, Almeida was named manager of Olimpia de Itá. He returned to his assistant role in the following year at Libertad, before returning to Olimpia in 2017 as manager of the reserve side.

On 3 April 2018, Almeida took over Sportivo Trinidense, but was sacked in May after only one win in eight matches. On 17 April 2019, he was named in charge of Resistencia, being relieved of his duties on 19 May.

In 2020, Almeida worked as a sports commentator before being again assistant of his father at Sol de América in 2021. On 3 May of that year, he was named interim manager after his father was sacked, but still left the club on 2 June.

Almeida returned to Olimpia in June 2021, as manager of the under-17 side. On 19 October, he replaced sacked Celso Ayala at the helm of River Plate Asunción, but left in the end of the season after suffering relegation.

On 5 July 2022, Almeida returned to the top tier after replacing Humberto Ovelar at the helm of Tacuary. On 12 October, he was himself dismissed.

== Personal life and death ==
Almeida's father Ever was also a footballer and a goalkeeper. He too later became a manager.

Iván Almeida died from a heart complication after an aortic valve surgery done on 23 December 2023, at the age of 45.
