= Estadio Martín Torres =

Football stadium in Asunción, Paraguay

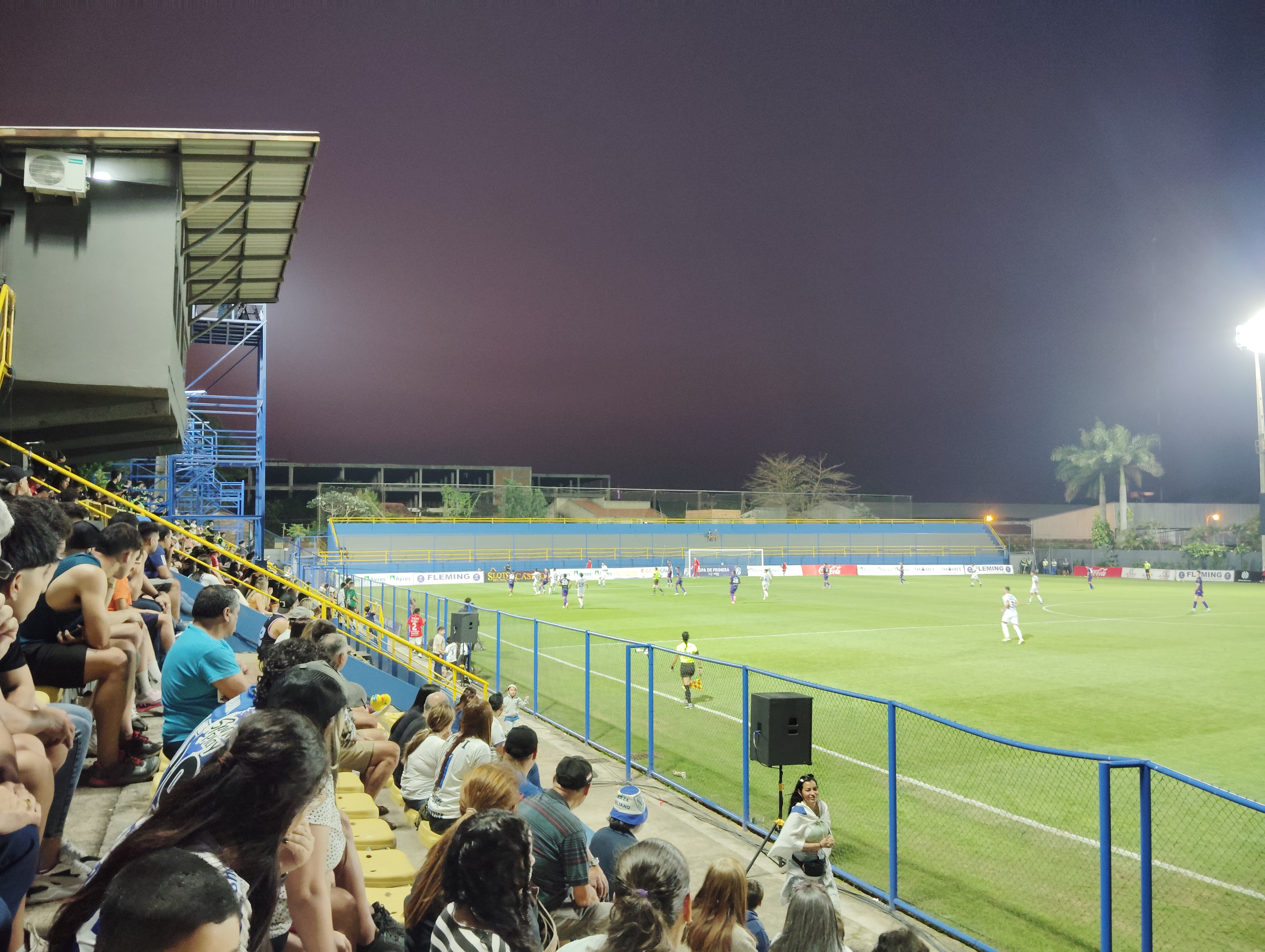
- Coordinates: 25°15′35″S 57°35′2″W

Estadio Martín Torres is a multi-use stadium in Asunción, Paraguay. It is currently used mostly for football matches and is the home stadium of Sportivo Trinidense. The stadium holds 3,000 people and opened in 1957.
