= Enrique Landaida =

Paraguayan football manager

Personal information
- Full name: Orlando Enrique Landaida Franco
- Date of birth: 14 September 1974 (age 52)
- Place of birth: Paraguay

Team information
- Current team: Recoleta (technical coordinator)

Managerial career
- Years: Team
- 2005–2012: Cerro Porteño (youth)
- 2012: Nacional Asunción (youth)
- 2013: Paraguay U15
- 2018–2021: Olimpia (interim)
- 2020: Sportivo San Lorenzo (assistant)
- 2020: Olimpia (interim)
- 2021: River Plate Asunción
- 2021: Olimpia
- 2021–2022: Olimpia (youth)
- 2023: Independiente FBC
- 2023: Recoleta (interim)

Orlando Enrique Landaida Franco (born 14 September 1974) is a Paraguayan football manager. He is the current technical coordinator of Recoleta.

== Career ==
Landaida began his career with Cerro Porteño, being a youth football coordinator while also a manager of the youth setup. In 2012 he moved to Club Nacional, under the same role.

In August 2012, Landaida took a role in the Paraguayan Football Association as a youth coordinator. In 2013, he was also in charge of the under-15 team in the 2013 South American U-15 Championship, and was subsequently named FIFA development director in the association.

After returning to Cerro in 2013, Landaida was appointed sporting director of the club in 2016, but left in March 2017. In May, he moved to Club Olimpia as a technical coordinator.

In December 2017, Landaida was named manager of Olimpia's youth setup. In 2020, he also had a brief spell as Roberto Torres' assistant at Sportivo San Lorenzo.

On 26 October 2020, after the dismissal of Daniel Garnero, Landaida was appointed interim manager of Olimpia's main squad. He left the role after the appointment of Néstor Gorosito, with three wins in three matches.

On 11 March 2021, Landaida was named at the helm of River Plate Asunción in the place of sacked Mario Jara.
