= Saúl Salcedo =

Paraguayan footballer (born 1997)

Personal information
- Full name: Saúl Savín Salcedo Zárate
- Date of birth: 29 August 1997 (age 29)
- Place of birth: Capiatá, Paraguay
- Height: 1.83 m (6 ft 0 in)
- Position: Centre-back

Team information
- Current team: Newell's Old Boys
- Number: 15

Youth career
- 2010–2015: Olimpia

Senior career*
Years	Team	Apps	(Gls)
2014–2018	Olimpia	52	(5)
2017–2018	→ Huracán (loan)	22	(0)
2018–2021	Huracán	50	(0)
2021–2024	Olimpia	79	(2)
2024–	Newell's Old Boys	54	(1)

International career^{‡}
2015–2018	Paraguay U20	10	(0)
2020	Paraguay U23	4	(1)
2019–	Paraguay	2	(0)
- * Club domestic league appearances and goals as of 17:27, 8 May 2026 (UTC) ‡ National team caps and goals as of 31 August 2022

Saúl Savín Salcedo Zárate (born 29 August 1997) is a Paraguayan professional footballer who plays as a centre-back for Newell's Old Boys, which he captains, and the Paraguay national team.

== International career ==
He was summoned for Paraguay national under-20 football team to play 2015 South American Youth Football Championship. Salcedo was named in Paraguay's provisional squad for Copa América Centenario but was cut from the final squad.

On 2 March 2019, Salcedo received a call-up to the Paraguay national team from Eduardo Berizzo ahead of that month's friendlies with Peru and Mexico. On 10 September 2019, Salcedo made his senior international debut in a 4–2 friendly win away to Jordan.

== Career statistics ==
=== International ===
As of match played 1 September 2022

Appearances and goals by national team and year
National team	Year	Apps	Goals
Paraguay	2019	1	0
Paraguay	2022	1	0
Total		2	0
