= Richard Ortiz =

Paraguayan footballer (born 1990)

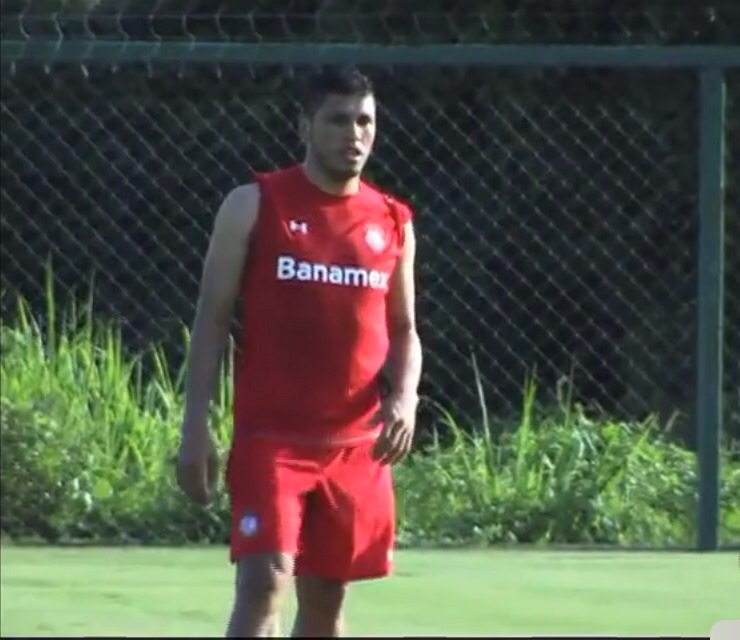
- Ortiz with Toluca in 2014

Personal information
- Full name: Richard Ortiz Busto
- Date of birth: 22 May 1990 (age 36)
- Place of birth: Asunción, Paraguay
- Height: 1.74 m (5 ft 8 1/2 in)
- Position: Central midfielder

Team information
- Current team: Olimpia
- Number: 6

Youth career
- 8 de Diciembre
- 2008–2009: Sportivo Iteño
- 2009: Olimpia Asunción

Senior career*
Years	Team	Apps	(Gls)
2009–2013	Olimpia	124	(10)
2013–2017	Toluca	53	(5)
2015	→ Libertad (loan)	17	(4)
2016–2017	→ Olimpia (loan)	41	(7)
2018–	Olimpia	225	(21)

International career^{‡}
2011–	Paraguay	36	(6)
- * Club domestic league appearances and goals as of 13 August 2025 ‡ National team caps and goals as of 31 August 2022

Richard Ortiz Busto (Spanish: [ˈritʃaɾð ˈoɾtis]; born 22 May 1990), is a Paraguayan professional footballer who plays as a central midfielder for Olimpia and the Paraguay national team. Ortiz is a fast player who plays as a central/defensive midfielder and is renowned for his long-distances strikes with his left foot.

On 19 July 2015, Paraguayan newspaper ExtraPRESS named Ortiz one of the most expensive player in Paraguay.

== Club career ==
=== Olimpia ===
In 2009, Ortiz signed for Paraguayan Primera División club Olimpia. He was named captain for the 2013 Season. After outstanding performances with the Paraguay national team and Olimpia, he was linked to several teams in the summer of 2013. Among the teams were Mexican side Toluca FC where his former coach and Paraguayan international José Saturnino Cardozo requested his services. Other sides from around the world, including Italian teams AS Roma, Genoa C.F.C and Bologna F.C., Premier League side West Ham United, Ligue 1's Toulouse FC, 2010 Champions Olympique Marseille, 2011 Champions Lille OSC, 2012 champions Montpellier SC and Argentinian giants Boca Juniors were reportedly interested in signing the midfielder. Olimpia finally agreed a US$2.5 million transfer to Toluca FC, which Ortiz also accepted.

=== Toluca ===
On 28 May 2013, José Saturnino Cardozo (actual manager) announced that Richard Ortiz would join Toluca FC. The club agreed to sign Ortiz in a 5-year contract for US$2.5 million. Ortiz would be the fourth Paraguayan in the squad joining then compatriots, Paulo da Silva, Edgar Benítez, and Pablo Velázquez. He scored his first goal for the Red Devils in the second match of the season against Monarcas Morelia. On 28 December 2015, Toluca FC announced the return of Ortiz.

=== Dorados de Sinaloa ===
On 11 June 2015, Dorados de Sinaloa announced via Twitter that they had reached an agreement with Toluca to sign Ortiz on loan in a 6-month contract. At that time Richard was concentrated with the Paraguay national team in Chile to play the 2015 Copa America, According to media, he let know his teammates his disagreement of playing with Dorados, the newly promoted team of the Liga MX.

=== Club Libertad ===
On 13 July, Club Libertad agreed to sign Ortiz from Deportivo Toluca on loan in a 6-month period, after he refused playing for Dorados de Sinaloa.

== International career ==
On 11 October 2011 he made his debut for the Paraguay national football team and also scored his first goal for his country in a 2014 World Cup qualifier match against Uruguay.

=== International goals ===
Scores and results list Paraguay's goal tally first.

No	Date	Venue	Opponent	Score	Result	Competition
1.	11 October 2011	Estadio Defensores del Chaco, Asunción, Paraguay	Uruguay	1–1	1–1	2014 FIFA World Cup qualification
2.	6 February 2013	Estadio Dr. Nicolás Léoz, Asunción, Paraguay	El Salvador	2–0	3–0	Friendly
3.	6 February 2013	Estadio Dr. Nicolás Léoz, Asunción, Paraguay	El Salvador	3–0	3–0	Friendly
4.	6 September 2013	Estadio Defensores del Chaco, Asunción, Paraguay	Bolivia	3–0	4–0	2014 FIFA World Cup qualification
5.	31 August 2017	Estadio Monumental David Arellano, Santiago, Chile	Chile	3–0	3–0	2018 FIFA World Cup qualification
6.	12 June 2018	Tivoli-Neu, Innsbruck, Austria	Japan	2–3	2–4	Friendly

== Honours ==
=== Club ===
Olimpia Asunción

- Paraguayan Primera División (6): 2011 Apertura, 2018 Apertura, 2018 Clausura, 2019 Apertura, 2019 Clausura, 2020 Clausura
