= Alfio Oviedo =

Paraguayan footballer (born 1995)

Personal information
- Full name: Alfio Ovidio Oviedo Álvarez
- Date of birth: 18 December 1995 (age 30)
- Place of birth: Ypacaraí, Paraguay
- Height: 1.81 m (5 ft 11 in)
- Position: Forward

Team information
- Current team: Tigre
- Number: 19

Youth career
- 2007–2010: Sportivo Luqueño
- 2010–2011: Estudiantes de La Plata
- 2011: Rubio Ñu

Senior career*
Years	Team	Apps	(Gls)
2011–2015	Rubio Ñu	23	(2)
2016–2017	Independiente FBC	42	(31)
2017–2019	Cerro Porteño	40	(12)
2018–2019	→ Newell's Old Boys (loan)	10	(1)
2019–2023	Libertad	26	(6)
2021	→ Guaraní (loan)	16	(6)
2022	→ Cerro Porteño (loan)	31	(8)
2023–2024	Cerro Porteño	24	(7)
2024–2025	Bolívar	23	(9)
2025–	Tigre	36	(3)

International career^{‡}
2017–	Paraguay	2	(0)
- * Club domestic league appearances and goals as of 17:51, 9 November 2026 (UTC) ‡ National team caps and goals as of 19 November 2024

Alfio Ovidio Oviedo Álvarez (born 18 December 1995) is a Paraguayan footballer who plays as a forward for Argentine club Tigre.

== International career ==
Alfio has been called to the U-20 team but only for friendlies. In the senior team, he had his chance when being called to make his debut for Paraguay by the coach Francisco Arce for the friendly match against the Mexico national team in Seattle on 1 July 2017, where he made his debut at 88'.

== Career statistics ==
=== International ===
As of 19 November 2024

National team	Year	Apps	Goals
Paraguay	2017	1	0
Paraguay	2024	1	0
Total		2	0
