= Supercopa Paraguay =

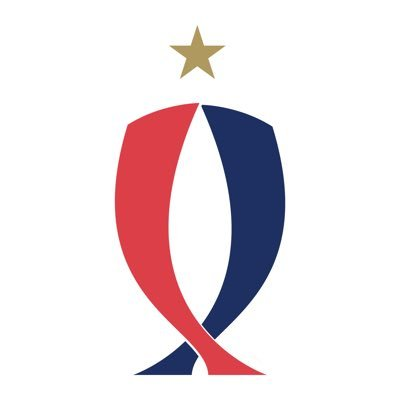
- Organiser(s): APF
- Founded: 2019; 7 years ago
- Region: Paraguay
- Teams: 2
- Related competitions: Primera División; Copa Paraguay
- Current champions: Cerro Porteño (1st title)
- Most championships: Libertad (2 titles)
- 2026 Supercopa Paraguay

The Supercopa Paraguay (Paraguay Supercup) is an annual one-match football official competition in Paraguay, organised by the Paraguayan Football Association (APF) which is played by the Primera División champions with the best record in the season's aggregate table and the Copa Paraguay champions, starting from 2021. This competition, created in October 2019, serves as the season's closing event and is scheduled to be played in December each year, one week after the end of the league season.

The competition was originally scheduled to be played for the first time in 2020, but its implementation had to be postponed to 2021 due to the COVID-19 pandemic and the cancellation of that year's Copa Paraguay.

== Participating clubs ==
The Supercopa Paraguay is played between:

- The Copa Paraguay champions
- The best-ranked Primera División champions in the season's aggregate table

In the event the same club wins the Copa Paraguay and also ends the season as the best-ranked league champion, its rival in the Supercopa will be the champion of the remaining league tournament (Apertura or Clausura).

In 2023, it was decided that if the same club won both Primera División Apertura and Clausura tournaments and the Copa Paraguay, the Supercopa Paraguay match would be cancelled and said club would be awarded the title automatically.

== Competition format ==
- One 90-minute game at a neutral venue (Estadio Defensores del Chaco)
- If tied, the winner is decided in a penalty shootout

== Finals ==
| Ed. | Season | Champions | Score | Runners-up | Ref. |
|---|---|---|---|---|---|
| 1 | 2021 | Olimpia (1) | 3–1 | Cerro Porteño | |
| 2 | 2022 | Sportivo Ameliano (1) | 1–0 | Olimpia | |
| 3 | 2023 | Libertad (1) | Match cancelled | —N/a | |
| 4 | 2024 | Libertad (2) | 2–1 | Olimpia | |
| 5 | 2025 | Cerro Porteño (1) | 5–2 | General Caballero (JLM) | |
| 6 | 2026 | | | | |

== Performance by club ==
| Club | Winners | Runners-up | Winning years | Runner-up years |
|---|---|---|---|---|
| Libertad | 2 | — | 2023, 2024 | — |
| Olimpia | 1 | 2 | 2021 | 2022, 2024 |
| Cerro Porteño | 1 | 1 | 2025 | 2021 |
| Sportivo Ameliano | 1 | — | 2022 | — |
| General Caballero (JLM) | — | 1 | — | 2025 |
