= 2017 APF División de Honor =

Primera División
- Season: 2017
- Dates: 3 February – 15 December 2017
- Champions: Apertura: Libertad (20th title); Clausura: Cerro Porteño (32nd title)
- Relegated: Rubio Ñu; Sportivo Trinidense
- Copa Libertadores: Cerro Porteño; Libertad; Guaraní; Olimpia
- Copa Sudamericana: Sol de América; General Díaz; Sportivo Luqueño; Nacional
- Matches: 265
- Goals: 673 (2.54 per match)
- Top goalscorer: Apertura: Santiago Salcedo (15 goals); Clausura: Rodrigo Bogarín and Diego Churín (11 goals each)
- Biggest home win: Nacional 5–0 Independiente CG (4 December)
- Biggest away win: General Díaz 0–5 Sol de América (30 March); Nacional 0–5 Sportivo Trinidense (15 September)
- Highest scoring: General Díaz 5–2 Guaraní (7 December)

The 2017 División Profesional season (officially the 2017 Copa TIGO-Visión Banco for sponsorship reasons) was the 83rd season of top-flight professional football in Paraguay.

== Teams ==
=== Stadia and locations ===
Locations of the 2017 Primera División teams

Team	Manager	Home city	Stadium	Capacity
Cerro Porteño	(Colombia) Leonel Álvarez	Asunción	General Pablo Rojas^{a}	45,000
Deportivo Capiatá	(Paraguay) Gustavo Florentín	Capiatá	Lic. Erico Galeano Segovia	10,000
General Díaz	Vacant	Luque	General Adrián Jara	3,500
Guaraní	(Argentina) Daniel Garnero	Asunción	Rogelio Livieres	6,000
Independiente	(Paraguay) Pablo Caballero	Asunción	Ricardo Gregor	1,500
Libertad	(Spain) Fernando Jubero	Asunción	Dr. Nicolás Leoz	10,000
Nacional	(Paraguay) Celso Ayala	Asunción	Arsenio Erico	4,000
Olimpia	(Paraguay) Aldo Bobadilla	Asunción	Manuel Ferreira	15,000
Rubio Ñu	(Argentina) Miguel Pavani (caretaker)	Asunción	La Arboleda	5,000
Sol de América	(Paraguay) Héctor Marecos	Villa Elisa	Luis Alfonso Giagni	5,000
Sportivo Luqueño	(Argentina) Javier Sanguinetti	Luque	Feliciano Cáceres	25,000
Sportivo Trinidense	(Paraguay) Carlos Jara Saguier	Asunción	Martín Torres	3,000

a: Played its Torneo Apertura home games at Estadio Defensores del Chaco due to remodeling works at Estadio General Pablo Rojas.

=== Managerial changes ===
Team	Outgoing manager	Manner of departure	Date of vacancy	Position in table	Incoming manager	Date of appointment
Torneo Apertura
Rubio Ñu	(Paraguay) Carlos Humberto Paredes	Resigned	14 February	10th	(Paraguay) Víctor Genes	14 February
Olimpia	(Uruguay) Pablo Repetto	Sacked	24 February	4th	(Paraguay) Mauro Caballero	24 February
Sportivo Luqueño	(Paraguay) Héctor Marecos	Sacked	25 February	11th	(Argentina) Adrián Coria	25 February
Sportivo Trinidense	(Paraguay) Juan Daniel Cáceres	Sacked	3 March	10th	(Paraguay) Daniel Farrar	4 March
Cerro Porteño	(Paraguay) Gustavo Florentín	Sacked	6 March	3rd	(Paraguay) Félix Darío León	6 March
Nacional	(Paraguay) (Uruguay) Ever Hugo Almeida	Resigned	19 March	10th	(Paraguay) Roberto Torres	19 March
Cerro Porteño	(Paraguay) Félix Darío León	End of caretaker spell	19 March	4th	(Uruguay) Gustavo Matosas	24 March
Sportivo Trinidense	(Paraguay) Daniel Farrar	Resigned	3 April	12th	(Paraguay) Carlos Morales	5 April
Deportivo Capiatá	(Paraguay) Diego Gavilán	Sacked	8 April	9th	(Paraguay) Héctor Marecos	8 April
Sportivo Trinidense	(Paraguay) Carlos Morales	End of caretaker spell	9 April	12th	(Paraguay) (Uruguay) Ever Hugo Almeida	9 April
Sportivo Luqueño	(Argentina) Adrián Coria	Resigned	9 April	11th	(Paraguay) Héctor Schönhauser	10 April
Olimpia	(Paraguay) Mauro Caballero	Resigned	10 May	5th	(Paraguay) (Uruguay) Ever Hugo Almeida	11 May
Sportivo Trinidense	(Paraguay) (Uruguay) Ever Hugo Almeida	Signed by Olimpia	11 May	12th	(Paraguay) Diego Gavilán	12 May
Sportivo Luqueño	(Paraguay) Héctor Schönhauser	Sacked	25 May	11th	(Argentina) Javier Sanguinetti	25 May
Deportivo Capiatá	(Paraguay) Héctor Marecos	Sacked	9 June	10th	(Paraguay) Nelson Bernal	9 June
Cerro Porteño	(Uruguay) Gustavo Matosas	Resigned	15 June	4th	(Paraguay) Jorge Núñez	15 June
Torneo Clausura
Rubio Ñu	(Paraguay) Víctor Genes	Sacked	25 June	Pre-season	(Argentina) Hernán Lisi	25 June
Sportivo Trinidense	(Paraguay) Diego Gavilán	Mutual consent	25 June	Pre-season	(Paraguay) Carlos Jara Saguier	28 June
Cerro Porteño	(Paraguay) Jorge Núñez	End of caretaker spell	27 June	Pre-season	(Colombia) Leonel Álvarez	27 June
Sol de América	(Argentina) Fernando Ortiz	Sacked	13 August	12th	(Paraguay) Diego Gavilán	14 August
Deportivo Capiatá	(Paraguay) Nelson Bernal	Sacked	11 September	11th	(Paraguay) Gustavo Florentín	11 September
Rubio Ñu	(Argentina) Hernán Lisi	Sacked	30 September	8th	(Argentina) Miguel Pavani	3 October
Olimpia	(Paraguay) (Uruguay) Ever Hugo Almeida	Sacked	30 September	2nd	(Paraguay) Aldo Bobadilla	1 October
General Díaz	(Paraguay) Aldo Bobadilla	Signed by Olimpia	1 October	1st	(Argentina) Mario Jara	2 October
Sol de América	(Paraguay) Diego Gavilán	Resigned	4 October	12th	(Paraguay) Héctor Marecos	4 October
Independiente CG	(Paraguay) Celso Ayala	Sacked	18 October	11th	(Paraguay) Pablo Caballero	18 October
Nacional	(Paraguay) Roberto Torres	Resigned	5 November	9th	(Paraguay) Celso Ayala	6 November
General Díaz	(Argentina) Mario Jara	Resigned	6 December	4th		

== Torneo Apertura ==
The Campeonato de Apertura, also the Copa TIGO-Visión Banco for sponsorship reasons, was the 115th official championship of the Primera División, called "Mario Agustín Sapriza Nunes", and the first championship of the 2017 season. It began on February 3 and ended on June 24.

=== Standings ===
Pos	Team	Pld	W	D	L	GF	GA	GD	Pts	Qualification
1	Libertad (C)	22	15	4	3	40	14	+26	49	Qualification to Copa Libertadores group stage
2	Guaraní	22	15	3	4	48	31	+17	48	
3	Olimpia	22	9	9	4	32	23	+9	36	
4	Cerro Porteño	22	11	2	9	26	26	0	35	
5	Sol de América	22	8	10	4	31	17	+14	34	
6	Independiente	22	7	8	7	27	27	0	29	
7	General Díaz	22	6	7	9	22	32	−10	25	
8	Deportivo Capiatá	22	7	3	12	21	31	−10	24	
9	Nacional	22	5	8	9	24	30	−6	23	
10	Rubio Ñu	22	4	8	10	25	35	−10	20	
11	Sportivo Luqueño	22	3	8	11	21	33	−12	17	
12	Sportivo Trinidense	22	1	12	9	23	41	−18	15	

Source: APF, Soccerway
Rules for classification: 1) Points, 2) Playoff game, in case two teams are tied in points.
If there are more than two teams tied in points: 2) Goal difference, 3) Goals for, 4) Away goals for, 5) Drawing of lots
(C) Champions

=== Results ===
Home \ Away	CCP	CAP	GEN	GUA	IND	LIB	NAC	OLI	RUB	SOL	SLU	STR
Cerro Porteño	—	2–1	1–0	0–4	1–1	1–0	2–1	2–1	4–0	0–3	2–1	0–0
Deportivo Capiatá	1–0	—	1–2	1–0	0–1	1–2	2–0	1–5	1–2	0–1	0–1	0–3
General Díaz	1–2	1–1	—	1–2	2–1	0–2	1–1	0–0	0–3	0–5	2–1	3–0
Guaraní	2–1	4–2	0–0	—	3–2	2–1	1–3	3–3	2–1	2–1	4–2	4–1
Independiente	1–2	1–0	0–0	4–2	—	0–2	0–2	1–1	0–1	0–0	1–0	2–2
Libertad	2–1	0–1	3–0	3–2	2–0	—	1–1	3–0	1–1	3–0	3–2	2–2
Nacional	2–0	1–2	2–4	1–2	1–2	0–1	—	2–4	0–3	1–1	0–0	1–1
Olimpia	2–0	2–0	2–0	0–2	1–1	0–3	0–0	—	1–1	2–2	2–1	1–1
Rubio Ñu	0–3	1–3	2–3	1–2	2–2	0–0	1–2	0–1	—	0–1	1–1	1–1
Sol de América	1–0	1–1	0–0	2–2	1–1	0–1	0–0	0–1	3–0	—	1–1	3–0
Sportivo Luqueño	2–0	1–1	2–1	0–1	1–2	0–3	1–2	0–0	1–1	0–3	—	0–0
Sportivo Trinidense	0–2	0–1	1–1	1–2	1–4	0–2	1–1	0–3	3–3	2–2	3–3	—

Source: Soccerway
Legend: Blue = home team win; Yellow = draw; Red = away team win.

=== Top goalscorers ===
Rank	Name	Club	Goals
1	(Paraguay) Santiago Salcedo	Libertad	15
2	(Paraguay) Alfio Oviedo	Independiente CG	11
3	(Paraguay) Néstor Camacho	Guaraní	10
4	(Paraguay) Brian Montenegro	Olimpia	8
5	(Argentina) Guido Di Vanni	Sportivo Luqueño	7
5	(Paraguay) Nicolás Martínez	Sportivo Trinidense	7
5	(Paraguay) Jesús Medina	Libertad	7
5	(Paraguay) Jorge Ortega	Rubio Ñu	7

Source: Soccerway

== Torneo Clausura ==
The Campeonato de Clausura, also the Copa TIGO-Visión Banco for sponsorship reasons, was the 116th official championship of the Primera División, called "Centenario del Club General Díaz - Dr. Hassel Aguilar Sosa", and the second championship of the 2017 season. It began on July 21 and ended on December 10.

=== Standings ===
Pos	Team	Pld	W	D	L	GF	GA	GD	Pts	Qualification
1	Cerro Porteño (C)	22	14	3	5	41	23	+18	45	Qualification to Copa Libertadores group stage
2	Olimpia	22	12	6	4	37	20	+17	42	
3	Guaraní	22	12	1	9	36	29	+7	37	
4	General Díaz	22	9	8	5	30	21	+9	35	
5	Sportivo Luqueño	22	9	6	7	36	31	+5	33	
6	Sol de América	22	7	7	8	27	32	−5	28	
7	Nacional	22	6	9	7	26	30	−4	27	
8	Libertad	22	7	5	10	26	27	−1	26	
9	Deportivo Capiatá	22	6	8	8	19	22	−3	26	
10	Rubio Ñu	22	6	7	9	16	25	−9	25	
11	Sportivo Trinidense	22	4	7	11	20	28	−8	19	
12	Independiente	22	5	3	14	16	41	−25	18	

Source: APF, Soccerway
Rules for classification: 1) Points, 2) Playoff game, in case two teams are tied in points.
If there are more than two teams tied in points: 2) Goal difference, 3) Goals for, 4) Away goals for, 5) Drawing of lots
(C) Champions

=== Results ===
Home \ Away	CCP	CAP	GEN	GUA	IND	LIB	NAC	OLI	RUB	SOL	SLU	STR
Cerro Porteño	—	2–0	2–1	4–0	1–0	1–1	3–1	1–1	1–0	3–2	4–1	1–0
Deportivo Capiatá	2–1	—	0–2	3–2	0–1	1–0	1–0	1–2	1–2	3–0	2–3	0–0
General Díaz	2–1	0–0	—	5–2	4–0	0–2	1–1	1–0	0–0	4–1	1–1	1–1
Guaraní	2–1	3–2	0–1	—	3–0	2–1	3–2	3–0	0–1	0–1	1–2	2–3
Independiente	3–2	0–0	1–3	0–1	—	0–1	1–2	1–3	0–0	4–1	0–3	0–2
Libertad	2–3	0–0	1–2	0–0	3–0	—	0–2	2–1	0–0	0–3	1–2	0–1
Nacional	1–2	0–0	2–0	0–4	5–0	2–1	—	1–1	1–1	1–1	1–1	0–5
Olimpia	2–1	1–2	1–0	2–0	2–2	1–0	2–0	—	3–0	2–2	3–2	2–0
Rubio Ñu	0–3	2–0	0–0	0–1	0–1	2–4	0–1	0–0	—	1–2	3–3	1–0
Sol de América	0–0	1–1	1–1	0–2	3–1	1–2	1–1	0–3	1–2	—	1–0	2–1
Sportivo Luqueño	2–3	0–0	3–0	0–2	2–0	1–3	1–1	1–1	3–0	0–2	—	1–0
Sportivo Trinidense	0–1	0–0	1–1	1–3	0–1	2–2	1–1	0–4	0–1	0–0	2–4	—

Source: Soccerway
Legend: Blue = home team win; Yellow = draw; Red = away team win.

=== Top goalscorers ===
Rank	Name	Club	Goals
1	(Paraguay) Rodrigo Bogarín	Guaraní	11
1	(Argentina) Diego Churín	Cerro Porteño	11
3	(Paraguay) Blas Díaz	General Díaz	9
3	(Paraguay) Walter González	Olimpia	9
5	(Paraguay) Gerardo Arévalos	Sportivo Luqueño	8
5	(Paraguay) Néstor Camacho	Olimpia	8
5	(Paraguay) Alfio Oviedo	Cerro Porteño	8
5	(Argentina) Javier Toledo	Sol de América	8
9	(Uruguay) Juan Manuel Salgueiro	Nacional	7
10	(Paraguay) Antonio Bareiro	Libertad	6
10	(Paraguay) Junior Marabel	Deportivo Capiatá	6
10	(Paraguay) Óscar Ruiz	Cerro Porteño	6
10	(Paraguay) Pablo Zeballos	Sol de América	6

Source: Soccerway

== Aggregate table ==
Pos	Team	Pld	W	D	L	GF	GA	GD	Pts	Qualification
1	Guaraní	44	27	4	13	84	60	+24	85	Qualification to Copa Libertadores second stage
2	Cerro Porteño (C)	44	25	5	14	67	49	+18	80	Qualification to Copa Libertadores group stage
3	Olimpia	44	21	15	8	69	43	+26	78	Qualification to Copa Libertadores first stage
4	Libertad (C)	44	22	9	13	66	41	+25	75	Qualification to Copa Libertadores group stage
5	Sol de América	44	15	17	12	57	49	+8	62	Qualification to Copa Sudamericana first stage
6	General Díaz	44	15	15	14	52	53	−1	60	Qualification to Copa Sudamericana first stage
7	Sportivo Luqueño	44	12	14	18	57	64	−7	50	Qualification to Copa Sudamericana first stage
8	Nacional	44	11	17	16	50	60	−10	50	Qualification to Copa Sudamericana first stage
9	Deportivo Capiatá	44	13	11	20	40	53	−13	50	
10	Independiente	44	12	11	21	43	68	−25	47	
11	Rubio Ñu	44	10	15	19	41	60	−19	45	
12	Sportivo Trinidense	44	5	19	20	43	69	−26	34	

Source: APF
Rules for classification: 1) Points, 2) Playoff game, in case two teams are tied in points.
If there are more than two teams tied in points: 2) Goal difference, 3) Goals for, 4) Away goals for, 5) Drawing of lots
(C) Champions

== Relegation ==
Relegation is determined at the end of the season by computing an average of the number of points earned per game over the past three seasons. The two teams with the lowest average were relegated to the División Intermedia for the following season.

Pos	Team	2015 Pts	2016 Pts	2017 Pts	Total Pts	Total Pld	Avg	Relegation
1	Guaraní	86	83	85	254	132	1.9242	
2	Olimpia	79	90	78	247	132	1.8712	
3	Cerro Porteño	96	66	80	242	132	1.8333	
4	Libertad	76	83	75	234	132	1.7727	
5	Sol de América	57	63	62	182	132	1.3788	
6	Deportivo Capiatá	54	67	50	171	132	1.2955	
7	Sportivo Luqueño	57	53	50	160	132	1.2121	
8	General Díaz	45	46	60	151	132	1.1439	
9	Nacional	43	54	50	147	132	1.1136	
10	Independiente (O)	—	—	47	47	44	1.0682	Qualification to Relegation playoff decider
11	Rubio Ñu (R)	48	48	45	141	132	1.0682	Qualification to Relegation playoff decider
12	Sportivo Trinidense (R)	—	—	34	34	44	0.7727	Relegation to División Intermedia

Source: APF

=== Relegation playoff decider ===
Since Independiente CG and Rubio Ñu ended with the same average, a match on neutral ground between both teams was played to determine the second relegated team. The loser was relegated to the División Intermedia.

15 December 2017
19:00 UTC–3

Rubio Ñu	1–3	Independiente
González 74'	Report	Portillo 2'; Bogado 8'; Ferreira 64'

Estadio General Adrián Jara, Luque
Attendance: 1,300
Referee: Éber Aquino

== See also ==
- 2017 in Paraguayan football
