= 2018 APF División de Honor =

Primera División
- Season: 2018
- Dates: 2 February – 8 December 2018
- Champions: Apertura: Olimpia (41st title); Clausura: Olimpia (42nd title)
- Relegated: Independiente; 3 de Febrero
- Copa Libertadores: Olimpia; Cerro Porteño; Libertad; Nacional
- Copa Sudamericana: Sol de América; Independiente; Deportivo Santaní; Guaraní (cup winners)
- Matches: 264
- Goals: 736 (2.79 per match)
- Top goalscorer: Apertura: Néstor Camacho (14 goals); Clausura: Óscar Cardozo (15 goals)
- Biggest home win: Cerro Porteño 5–0 Nacional (13 April); Guaraní 5–0 3 de Febrero (11 November)
- Biggest away win: Deportivo Santaní 0–5 Olimpia (15 October)
- Highest scoring: Guaraní 6–2 Sol de América (3 February); 3 de Febrero 4–4 Libertad (17 November)

The 2018 División Profesional season (officially the Copa de Primera TIGO-Visión Banco 2018 for sponsorship reasons) was the 84th season of top-flight professional football in Paraguay. The season began on 2 February and ended on 8 December. Cerro Porteño were the defending champions.

In the Torneo Apertura, Olimpia won their forty-first league title with two matches to spare following a 2–1 win over Libertad on 30 May. Olimpia also clinched their forty-second league title in the Torneo Clausura with two matches to spare after beating Guaraní 4–1 on 28 November.

== Teams ==
=== Stadia and locations ===
Locations of the 2018 Primera División teams

Team	Manager	Home city	Stadium	Capacity
3 de Febrero	(Uruguay) Eduardo Rivera	Ciudad del Este	Antonio Aranda	23,500
Cerro Porteño	(Spain) Fernando Jubero	Asunción	General Pablo Rojas	45,000
Deportivo Capiatá	(Paraguay) Julio Cabrera (caretaker)	Capiatá	Lic. Erico Galeano Segovia	10,000
Deportivo Santaní	(Paraguay) Héctor Marecos	San Estanislao	Juan José Vázquez^{a}	8,000
General Díaz	(Paraguay) Florencio Villalba	Luque	General Adrián Jara	3,500
Guaraní	(Paraguay) Gustavo Florentín	Asunción	Rogelio Livieres^{b}	6,000
Independiente	(Argentina) Mario Jara	Asunción	Ricardo Gregor	1,500
Libertad	(Colombia) Leonel Álvarez	Asunción	Dr. Nicolás Leoz	10,000
Nacional	(Argentina) Fernando Gamboa	Asunción	Arsenio Erico	4,000
Olimpia	(Argentina) Daniel Garnero	Asunción	Manuel Ferreira	25,000
Sol de América	(Paraguay) Ever Hugo Almeida	Villa Elisa	Luis Alfonso Giagni	10,000
Sportivo Luqueño	(Paraguay) Pedro Sarabia	Luque	Feliciano Cáceres	25,000

Note: Teams occasionally play their home games at Estadio Defensores del Chaco in Asunción. Derbies between Cerro Porteño and Olimpia are also played at this stadium.
a: Deportivo Santaní played their Torneo Apertura home match against Olimpia at Estadio Antonio Aranda in Ciudad del Este instead of their regular stadium Estadio Juan José Vázquez in San Estanislao.
b: Guaraní played their home games at Estadio Defensores del Chaco in Asunción until mid-May while their regular stadium Estadio Rogelio Livieres underwent maintenance works. Guaraní played their Torneo Apertura home match against Olimpia at Estadio Antonio Aranda in Ciudad del Este.

=== Managerial changes ===
Team	Outgoing manager	Manner of departure	Date of vacancy	Position in table	Incoming manager	Date of appointment
Torneo Apertura
General Díaz	(Argentina) Mario Jara	Resigned	6 December 2017	Pre-season	(Paraguay) Aldo Bobadilla	15 December 2017
Guaraní	(Argentina) Daniel Garnero	Signed by Olimpia	7 December 2017	Pre-season	(Argentina) Sebastián Saja	8 December 2017
Olimpia	(Paraguay) Aldo Bobadilla	Mutual consent	11 December 2017	Pre-season	(Argentina) Daniel Garnero	13 December 2017
Libertad	(Spain) Fernando Jubero	Resigned	23 December 2017	Pre-season	(Paraguay) Aldo Bobadilla	28 December 2017
General Díaz	(Paraguay) Aldo Bobadilla	Resigned	28 December 2017	Pre-season	(Paraguay) Florencio Villalba (caretaker)	2 January 2018
General Díaz	(Paraguay) Florencio Villalba	End of caretaker spell	24 January 2018	Pre-season	(Paraguay) Francisco Arce	24 January 2018
Cerro Porteño	(Colombia) Leonel Álvarez	Resigned	31 January 2018	Pre-season	(Paraguay) Jorge Núñez (caretaker)	31 January 2018
Cerro Porteño	(Paraguay) Jorge Núñez	End of caretaker spell	5 February 2018	10th	(Argentina) Luis Zubeldía	5 February 2018
Sportivo Luqueño	(Argentina) Javier Sanguinetti	Sacked	25 February 2018	12th	(Uruguay) Eduardo Rivera	25 February 2018
3 de Febrero	(Brazil) Marcio Marolla	Sacked	4 March 2018	12th	(Paraguay) José Arrúa	5 March 2018
Deportivo Santaní	(Paraguay) Pedro Sarabia	Mutual consent	14 March 2018	11th	(Argentina) Mario Jara	15 March 2018
Guaraní	(Argentina) Sebastián Saja	Resigned	25 March 2018	9th	(Spain) Fernando Burgo (caretaker)	25 March 2018
Sportivo Luqueño	(Uruguay) Eduardo Rivera	Resigned	3 April 2018	8th	(Argentina) Fernando Ortiz	4 April 2018
General Díaz	(Paraguay) Francisco Arce	Sacked	8 April 2018	8th	(Paraguay) Florencio Villalba (caretaker)	9 April 2018
Deportivo Capiatá	(Paraguay) Gustavo Florentín	Resigned	26 May 2018	8th	(Paraguay) Diego Gavilán	27 May 2018
Sportivo Luqueño	(Argentina) Fernando Ortiz	Sacked	27 May 2018	11th	(Paraguay) Héctor Schönhauser (caretaker)	28 May 2018
Guaraní	(Spain) Fernando Burgo	End of caretaker spell	30 May 2018	7th	(Argentina) Juan Manuel Azconzábal	31 May 2018
Sol de América	(Paraguay) Héctor Marecos	Sacked	31 May 2018	6th	(Paraguay) Alfredo Vera (caretaker)	1 June 2018
Sol de América	(Paraguay) Alfredo Vera	End of caretaker spell	8 June 2018	6th	(Argentina) Fernando Ortiz	9 June 2018
Sportivo Luqueño	(Paraguay) Héctor Schönhauser	End of caretaker spell	9 June 2018	10th	(Paraguay) Gustavo Florentín	9 June 2018
Torneo Clausura
Libertad	(Paraguay) Aldo Bobadilla	Mutual consent	21 July 2018	9th	(Paraguay) Eduardo Villalba (caretaker)	21 July 2018
General Díaz	(Paraguay) Florencio Villalba	End of caretaker spell	22 July 2018	6th	(Paraguay) Aldo Bobadilla	22 July 2018
3 de Febrero	(Paraguay) José Arrúa	Resigned	5 August 2018	7th	(Uruguay) Eduardo Rivera	5 August 2018
Cerro Porteño	(Argentina) Luis Zubeldía	Sacked	20 August 2018	3rd	(Spain) Fernando Jubero	22 August 2018
Sol de América	(Argentina) Fernando Ortiz	Resigned	24 August 2018	10th	(Paraguay) Ever Hugo Almeida	25 August 2018
Deportivo Santaní	(Argentina) Mario Jara	Sacked	26 August 2018	9th	(Paraguay) Héctor Marecos	28 August 2018
Guaraní	(Argentina) Juan Manuel Azconzábal	Sacked	9 September 2018	10th	(Paraguay) Gustavo Florentín	10 September 2018
Sportivo Luqueño	(Paraguay) Gustavo Florentín	Signed by Guaraní	9 September 2018	5th	(Argentina) Javier Sanguinetti	10 September 2018
Independiente (CG)	(Paraguay) Pablo Caballero	Resigned	23 September 2018	12th	(Paraguay) Víctor Genes	24 September 2018
Libertad	(Paraguay) Eduardo Villalba	End of caretaker spell	8 October 2018	3rd	(Colombia) Leonel Álvarez	9 October 2018
Deportivo Capiatá	(Paraguay) Diego Gavilán	Resigned	20 October 2018	6th	(Paraguay) Pablo Caballero	20 October 2018
Sportivo Luqueño	(Argentina) Javier Sanguinetti	Sacked	22 October 2018	12th	(Paraguay) Pedro Sarabia	23 October 2018
Independiente (CG)	(Paraguay) Víctor Genes	Health issues	2 November 2018	11th	(Paraguay) Osvaldo Cohener (caretaker)	2 November 2018
Independiente (CG)	(Paraguay) Osvaldo Cohener	End of caretaker spell	4 November 2018	12th	(Argentina) Mario Jara	4 November 2018
Nacional	(Paraguay) Celso Ayala	Resigned	5 November 2018	8th	(Argentina) Fernando Gamboa	6 November 2018
General Díaz	(Paraguay) Aldo Bobadilla	Mutual consent	13 November 2018	12th	(Paraguay) Florencio Villalba	13 November 2018
Deportivo Capiatá	(Paraguay) Pablo Caballero	Sacked	8 December 2018	8th	(Paraguay) Julio Cabrera (caretaker)	8 December 2018

== Torneo Apertura ==
The Campeonato de Apertura, named "Centenario del Estadio Defensores del Chaco", was the 117th official championship of the Primera División and the first championship of the 2018 season. It started on February 2 and concluded on June 10.

=== Standings ===
Pos	Team	Pld	W	D	L	GF	GA	GD	Pts	Qualification
1	Olimpia (C)	22	16	5	1	52	22	+30	53	Qualification to Copa Libertadores group stage
2	Cerro Porteño	22	12	6	4	43	17	+26	42	
3	Libertad	22	11	6	5	37	24	+13	39	
4	Nacional	22	10	8	4	32	21	+11	38	
5	Independiente	22	9	4	9	30	32	−2	31	
6	Sol de América	22	8	6	8	36	40	−4	30	
7	General Díaz	22	6	6	10	27	39	−12	24	
8	Guaraní	22	6	5	11	25	39	−14	23	
9	Deportivo Santaní	22	4	10	8	22	25	−3	22	
10	Sportivo Luqueño	22	5	6	11	25	37	−12	21	
11	Deportivo Capiatá	22	5	6	11	31	44	−13	21	
12	3 de Febrero	22	2	8	12	21	40	−19	14	

Source: APF, Soccerway
Rules for classification: 1) Points, 2) Playoff game, if needed to decide championship.
If there are more than two teams tied in points: 2) Goal difference, 3) Goals for, 4) Away goals for, 5) Drawing of lots.
(C) Champions

=== Results ===
Home \ Away	3FE	CCP	CAP	SAN	GEN	GUA	IND	LIB	NAC	OLI	SOL	SLU
3 de Febrero	—	1–1	3–0	0–0	2–2	1–2	0–2	1–4	1–1	0–4	2–1	0–2
Cerro Porteño	3–1	—	2–2	0–0	4–1	2–1	4–0	0–2	5–0	1–0	2–0	2–0
Deportivo Capiatá	2–1	2–3	—	2–1	1–1	0–1	2–1	2–4	0–1	2–2	1–1	4–1
Deportivo Santaní	1–0	1–1	3–3	—	0–1	2–0	1–1	1–2	1–1	1–5	2–0	3–0
General Díaz	3–2	1–0	1–1	1–0	—	0–3	1–1	0–2	1–2	1–2	1–1	2–1
Guaraní	1–1	0–4	2–1	1–1	2–2	—	0–1	0–2	1–4	0–0	6–2	1–4
Independiente	1–1	0–3	3–1	1–0	2–3	2–1	—	3–1	0–3 (Note: Match awarded 3–0 to Nacional due to Independiente (CG) fielding a non-native Paraguayan under-19 player. The original result was a 4–0 win for Independiente (CG).)	1–2	3–1	4–1
Libertad	2–0	1–1	3–2	1–1	1–0	2–0	1–0	—	0–0	0–1	1–2	1–2
Nacional	0–0	2–1	4–0	0–0	3–1	3–0	1–0	1–1	—	0–0	1–1	0–2
Olimpia	3–2	1–0	1–0	2–1	3–1	5–2	4–2	2–1	4–2	—	3–3	3–0
Sol de América	4–1	0–3	5–1	3–2	4–3	0–0	0–1	3–3	1–0	0–3	—	3–1
Sportivo Luqueño	1–1	1–1	1–2	0–0	2–0	0–1	1–1	2–2	1–3	2–2	0–1	—

Source: APF, Soccerway
Legend: Blue = home team win; Yellow = draw; Red = away team win.

=== Top goalscorers ===
Rank	Name	Club	Goals
1	(Paraguay) Néstor Camacho	Olimpia	14
2	(Paraguay) Sebastián Ferreira	Independiente	11 (Note: Sebastián Ferreira's official goal tally excludes 2 goals scored in the match awarded to Nacional.)
2	(Paraguay) William Mendieta	Olimpia	11
4	(Paraguay) Antonio Bareiro	Libertad	10
5	(Paraguay) Adam Bareiro	Nacional	9
5	(Paraguay) César Villagra	Sol de América	9
7	(Paraguay) Óscar Cardozo	Libertad	8
7	(Paraguay) Fabio Escobar	Deportivo Santaní	8
9	(Paraguay) Enrique Borja	General Díaz	7
10	(Paraguay) Ernesto Álvarez	Sol de América	6
10	(Argentina) Diego Churín	Cerro Porteño	6

Source: APF, Soccerway

== Torneo Clausura ==
The Campeonato de Clausura, named "Dr. Gerónimo Angulo Gastón", was the 118th official championship of the Primera División and the second championship of the 2018 season. It started on July 17 and concluded on December 8.

=== Standings ===
Pos	Team	Pld	W	D	L	GF	GA	GD	Pts	Qualification
1	Olimpia (C)	22	15	4	3	48	20	+28	49	Qualification to Copa Libertadores group stage
2	Cerro Porteño	22	11	7	4	36	21	+15	40	
3	Libertad	22	10	7	5	33	20	+13	37	
4	Sol de América	22	9	6	7	29	30	−1	33	
5	Deportivo Santaní	22	7	7	8	22	29	−7	28	
6	Nacional	22	6	9	7	28	31	−3	27	
7	Guaraní	22	6	7	9	27	30	−3	25	
8	3 de Febrero	22	6	7	9	32	37	−5	25	
9	Sportivo Luqueño	22	6	7	9	23	30	−7	25	
10	Deportivo Capiatá	22	6	6	10	25	36	−11	24	
11	General Díaz	22	5	7	10	30	38	−8	22	
12	Independiente	22	4	8	10	22	32	−10	20	

Source: APF, Soccerway
Rules for classification: 1) Points, 2) Playoff game, if needed to decide championship.
If there are more than two teams tied in points: 2) Goal difference, 3) Goals for, 4) Away goals for, 5) Drawing of lots.
(C) Champions

=== Results ===
Home \ Away	3FE	CCP	CAP	SAN	GEN	GUA	IND	LIB	NAC	OLI	SOL	SLU
3 de Febrero	—	1–3	0–0	0–0	1–1	2–1	4–1	4–4	1–3	1–0	0–2	0–2
Cerro Porteño	1–1	—	1–0	1–1	3–1	1–1	2–0	0–1	1–1	0–2	2–0	0–1
Deportivo Capiatá	2–1	2–4	—	0–2	3–1	1–1	3–0	1–1	1–1	1–4	0–1	2–1
Deportivo Santaní	1–3	2–2	0–1	—	3–1	2–2	0–0	1–0	3–0	0–5	2–1	1–0
General Díaz	1–5	1–4	2–3	4–0	—	3–1	2–1	1–1	1–2	1–1	1–0	2–2
Guaraní	5–0	0–1	1–0	1–0	0–2	—	0–0	2–2	1–1	0–3	2–1	3–0
Independiente	1–4	0–1	2–0	0–0	2–2	1–0	—	1–0	2–2	1–1	2–2	1–1
Libertad	0–0	1–1	3–0	3–1	1–0	3–0	2–1	—	1–0	0–2	4–0	2–3
Nacional	4–2	0–3	3–1	3–1	1–1	0–0	0–3	1–2	—	1–2	0–0	3–1
Olimpia	1–0	2–2	4–1	0–1	2–2	4–1	3–2	1–0	2–0	—	3–2	4–2
Sol de América	3–1	2–1	2–2	1–1	1–0	3–2	2–1	0–2	1–1	2–1	—	1–0
Sportivo Luqueño	1–1	1–2	1–1	1–0	2–0	0–3	1–0	0–0	1–1	0–1	2–2	—

Source: APF, Soccerway
Legend: Blue = home team win; Yellow = draw; Red = away team win.

=== Top goalscorers ===
Rank	Name	Club	Goals
1	(Paraguay) Óscar Cardozo	Libertad	15
2	(Argentina) Diego Churín	Cerro Porteño	12
2	(Argentina) Adrián Martínez	Sol de América	12
2	(Paraguay) Santiago Salcedo	Deportivo Capiatá	12
5	(Paraguay) Adam Bareiro	Nacional	10
5	(Paraguay) Jorge Ortega	Olimpia	10
7	(Paraguay) Enrique Borja	General Díaz	9
7	(Paraguay) Roque Santa Cruz	Olimpia	9
9	(Paraguay) William Mendieta	Olimpia	8
10	(Argentina) Facundo Parra	3 de Febrero	7

Source: APF, Soccerway

== Aggregate table ==
Pos	Team	Pld	W	D	L	GF	GA	GD	Pts	Qualification
1	Olimpia (C)	44	31	9	4	100	42	+58	102	Qualification to Copa Libertadores group stage
2	Cerro Porteño	44	23	13	8	79	38	+41	82	Qualification to Copa Libertadores group stage
3	Libertad	44	21	13	10	70	44	+26	76	Qualification to Copa Libertadores second stage
4	Nacional	44	16	17	11	60	52	+8	65	Qualification to Copa Libertadores first stage
5	Sol de América	44	17	12	15	65	70	−5	63	Qualification to Copa Sudamericana first stage (Note: Guaraní qualified for the Copa Sudamericana first stage as 2018 Copa Paraguay champions.)
6	Independiente	44	13	12	19	52	64	−12	51	Qualification to Copa Sudamericana first stage
7	Deportivo Santaní	44	11	17	16	44	54	−10	50	Qualification to Copa Sudamericana first stage
8	Guaraní	44	12	12	20	52	69	−17	48	Qualification to Copa Sudamericana first stage
9	Sportivo Luqueño	44	11	13	20	48	67	−19	46	
10	General Díaz	44	11	13	20	57	78	−21	46	
11	Deportivo Capiatá	44	11	12	21	56	80	−24	45	
12	3 de Febrero	44	8	15	21	53	77	−24	39	

Source: APF
Rules for classification: 1) Points, 2) Playoff game, only if needed to decide international qualification between two teams.
If there are more than two teams tied in points: 2) Goal difference, 3) Goals for, 4) Away goals for, 5) Drawing of lots.
(C) Champions

== Relegation ==
Relegation is determined at the end of the season by computing an average of the number of points earned per game over the past three seasons. The two teams with the lowest average were relegated to the División Intermedia for the following season.

Pos	Team	2016 Pts	2017 Pts	2018 Pts	Total Pts	Total Pld	Avg	Relegation
1	Olimpia	90	78	102	270	132	2.045	
2	Libertad	83	75	76	234	132	1.773	
3	Cerro Porteño	66	80	82	228	132	1.727	
4	Guaraní	83	85	48	216	132	1.636	
5	Sol de América	63	62	63	188	132	1.424	
6	Nacional	54	50	65	169	132	1.28	
7	Deportivo Capiatá	67	50	45	162	132	1.227	
8	General Díaz	46	60	46	152	132	1.152	
9	Deportivo Santaní	—	—	50	50	44	1.136	
10	Sportivo Luqueño	53	50	46	149	132	1.129	
11	Independiente (R)	—	47	51	98	88	1.114	Relegation to División Intermedia
12	3 de Febrero (R)	—	—	39	39	44	0.886	Relegation to División Intermedia

Source: APF
