= Óscar Ruiz (footballer) =

Paraguayan footballer (born 1991)

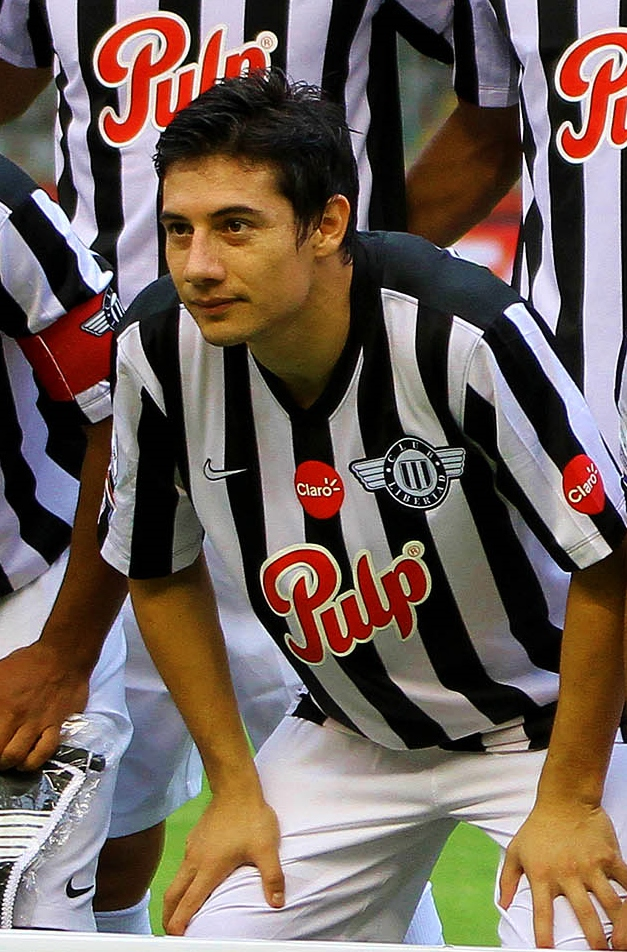
- Ruiz with Libertad in 2015

Personal information
- Full name: Óscar Ramón Ruiz Roa
- Date of birth: 14 May 1991 (age 35)
- Place of birth: Asunción, Paraguay
- Height: 1.71 m (5 ft 7 in)
- Position: Winger

Team information
- Current team: Novorizontino
- Number: 22

Youth career
- 2005–2010: Libertad

Senior career*
Years	Team	Apps	(Gls)
2010–2011	Libertad	5	(0)
2011	General Caballero ZC	19	(1)
2012	Guarani	6	(0)
2012	Rubio Ñu	10	(1)
2013–2015	Deportivo Capiatá	70	(13)
2015–2016	Libertad	10	(0)
2015	→ Sportivo Luqueño (loan)	25	(3)
2016	→ Deportivo Capiatá (loan)	39	(13)
2017–2021	Cerro Porteño	148	(36)
2021–2022	Bahia	25	(1)
2022	→ Juventude (loan)	24	(5)
2023–2024	Tacuary	54	(8)
2024–	Novorizontino	21	(2)

International career^{‡}
2007	Paraguay U17	11	(2)
2011	Paraguay U20	10	(2)
2014–	Paraguay	2	(0)
- * Club domestic league appearances and goals as of 16 December 2025 ‡ National team caps and goals as of 1 April 2015

Óscar Ramón Ruiz Roa (born 14 May 1991) is a Paraguayan professional footballer who plays as a left winger for Novorizontino.

== Club career ==
Ruiz played in different clubs of Paraguay starting with Libertad, General Caballero ZC, Guarani, Rubio Ñu and Deportivo Capiatá.

On 31 March 2021, Ruiz moved abroad for the first time in his career, signing a three-year deal with the Bahia.

== International career ==
Ruiz's first call up was for a friendly match against Peru in November 2014.

== Career statistics ==
=== Club ===
As of match played 23 October 2024

Appearances and goals by club, season and competition
Club	Season	League			State league		National cup (Note: Includes Copa Paraguay, Copa do Brasil)		Continental		Other		Total	
Club	Season	Division	Apps	Goals	Apps	Goals	Apps	Goals	Apps	Goals	Apps	Goals	Apps	Goals
Libertad	2011	Paraguayan Primera División	5	0	—		—		0	0	—		5	0
General Caballero ZC	2011	Paraguayan Primera División	19	1	—		—		—		—		19	1
Guaraní	2012	Paraguayan Primera División	6	0	—		—		—		—		6	0
Rubio Ñu	2012	Paraguayan Primera División	10	1	—		—		—		—		10	1
Deportivo Capiatá	2013	Paraguayan Primera División	38	9	—		—		—		—		38	9
Deportivo Capiatá	2014	Paraguayan Primera División	32	4	—		—		6 (Note: Appearance(s) in Copa Sudamericana)	1	—		38	5
Deportivo Capiatá	Total		70	13	—		—		6	1	—		76	14
Libertad	2015	Paraguayan Primera División	10	0	—		—		3 (Note: Appearance(s) in Copa Libertadores)	0	—		13	0
Sportivo Luqueño (loan)	2015	Paraguayan Primera División	17	2	—		—		8	1	—		25	3
Deportivo Capiatá (loan)	2016	Paraguayan Primera División	39	13	—		—		—		—		39	13
Cerro Porteño	2017	Paraguayan Primera División	38	10	—		—		5	1	—		43	11
Cerro Porteño	2018	Paraguayan Primera División	26	5	—		0	0	4	0	—		30	5
Cerro Porteño	2019	Paraguayan Primera División	29	10	—		0	0	8	1	—		37	11
Cerro Porteño	2020	Paraguayan Primera División	26	7	—		—		4	1	—		30	8
Cerro Porteño	2021	Paraguayan Primera División	6	0	—		0	0	0	0	—		6	0
Cerro Porteño	Total		125	32	—		0	0	21	3	—		146	35
Bahia	2021	Série A	19	0	0	0	3	0	6	0	5 (Note: Appearance(s) in Copa do Nordeste)	1	33	1
Bahia	2022	Série B	0	0	1 (Note: Appearance(s) in Campeonato Baiano)	0	0	0	—		0	0	1	0
Bahia	Total		19	0	1	0	3	0	6	0	5	1	34	1
Juventude (loan)	2022	Série A	24	5	0	0	2	1	—		—		26	6
Tacuary	2023	Paraguayan Primera División	37	6	—		0	0	5	2	—		42	8
Tacuary	2024	Paraguayan Primera División	17	2	—		0	0	—		—		17	2
Tacuary	Total		54	8	—		0	0	5	2	—		59	10
Novorizontino	2024	Série B	4	0	0	0	—		—		—		4	0
Career total			402	75	1	0	5	1	49	7	5	1	462	84

=== International ===
As of match played 18 November 2014

Appearances and goals by national team and year
National team	Year	Apps	Goals
Paraguay	2014	2	0
Total		2	0

== Honours ==
Cerro Porteño

- Paraguayan Primera División: 2017 Clausura, 2020 Apertura

Bahia

- Copa do Nordeste: 2021
