= Osmar Leguizamón =

Paraguayan football player (born 1994)

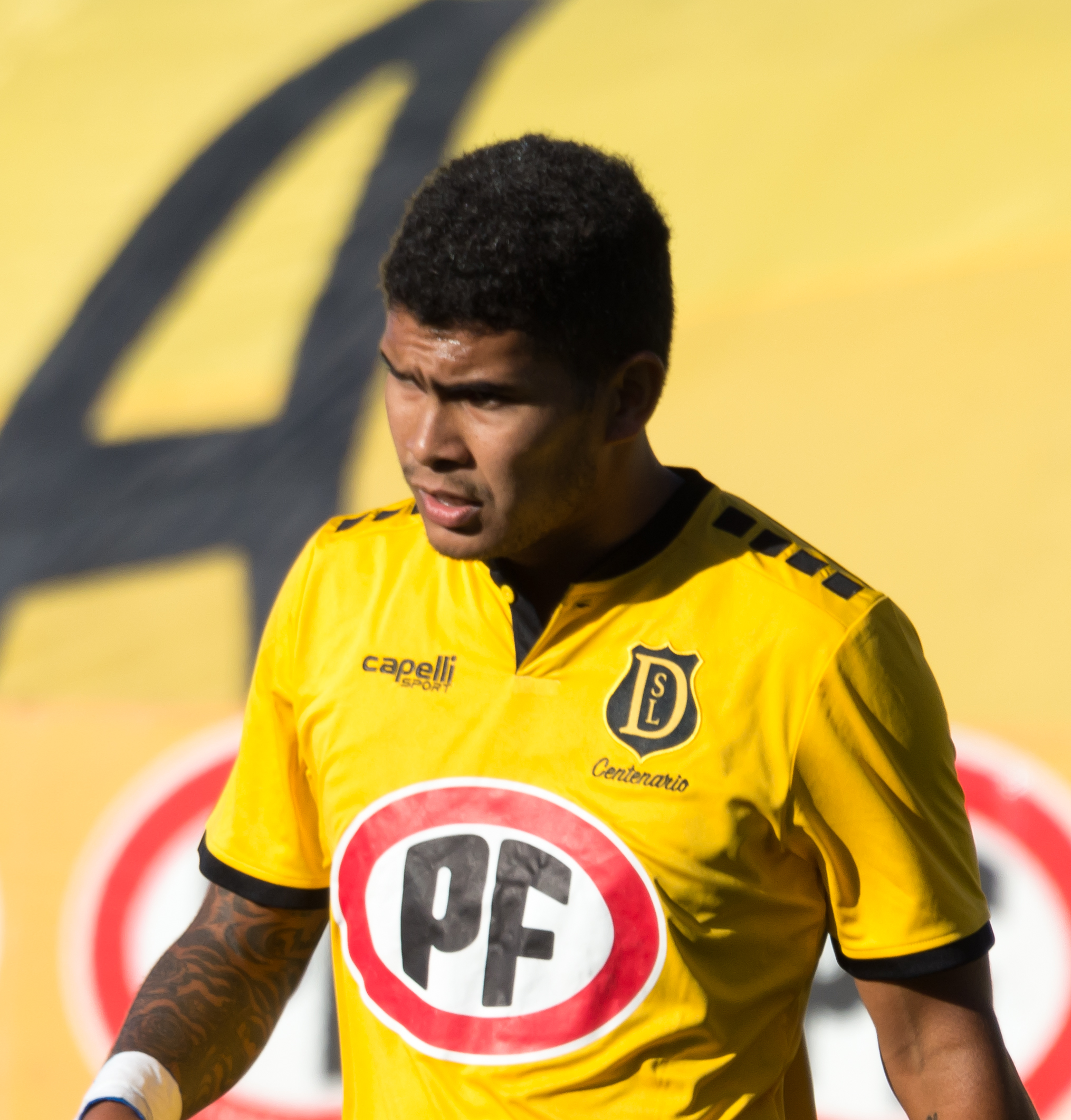

Personal information
- Full name: Osmar Leguizamón Pavón
- Date of birth: 11 May 1994 (age 32)
- Place of birth: Concepción, Paraguay
- Position: Forward

Team information
- Current team: Deportivo Santaní

Senior career*
| Years | Team | Apps | (Gls) |
| 2012–2019 | Olimpia | 7 | (1) |
| 2016 | → General Caballero (loan) | 32 | (18) |
| 2017 | → Rubio Ñu (loan) | 6 | (0) |
| 2017–2018 | → Sportivo Luqueño (loan) | 36 | (8) |
| 2018 | → Godoy Cruz (loan) | 5 | (0) |
| 2019 | San Luis | 12 | (1) |
| 2019– | Deportivo Santaní | 4 | (1) |

International career
| 2011 | Paraguay U17 | 4 | (0) |
- * Club domestic league appearances and goals as of 14:22, 5 May 2019 (UTC)

Osmar Leguizamón Pavón (born 11 May 1994) is a Paraguayan professional footballer who plays as a forward for Deportivo Santaní.

== Career ==
=== Club ===
Leguizamón began his career with Olimpia. He was selected by José Cardozo for his pro debut on 15 December 2012, featuring in the final moments of a 4–1 defeat to Sportivo Carapeguá in the Paraguayan Primera División. Two years later, in December 2014, Leguizamón scored his first goal during a league fixture with General Díaz. 2016 saw Leguizamón join newly promoted Paraguayan Primera División team General Caballero on loan. His first goals, a brace, arrived in a 3–7 defeat to Deportivo Capiatá on 2 April, with a hat-trick following days later against General Díaz. Thirteen more goals followed.

Rubio Ñu loaned Leguizamón at the beginning of the 2017 campaign. He was selected six times for Rubio Ñu, which preceded his return to Olimpia in June. Upon arriving back to his parent club, Leguizamón was loaned out again as he agreed to sign for Sportivo Luqueño. He remained for the rest of 2017 as well as the beginning of the 2018 season, making thirty-eight appearances whilst netting eight goals. On 8 August 2018, Argentine Primera División side Godoy Cruz loaned Leguizamón. His bow for the club came on 18 August in a goalless draw with Argentinos Juniors, which was one of five matches for them.

Leguizamón joined San Luis of Primera B de Chile in January 2019. Six months later, he returned to Paraguay and joined Deportivo Santaní.

=== International ===
Leguizamón represented Paraguay's U17s at the 2011 South American U-17 Championship in Ecuador. He won four caps as his nation went on to finish bottom of the final stage.

== Career statistics ==
As of 22 January 2019.

Club statistics
| Club | Season | League | | | Cup | | Continental | | Other | | Total | |
| Club | Season | Division | Apps | Goals | Apps | Goals | Apps | Goals | Apps | Goals | Apps | Goals |
|---|---|---|---|---|---|---|---|---|---|---|---|---|
| Olimpia | 2012 | Paraguayan Primera División | 1 | 0 | — | | 0 | 0 | 0 | 0 | 1 | 0 |
| Olimpia | 2013 | Paraguayan Primera División | 0 | 0 | — | | 0 | 0 | 0 | 0 | 0 | 0 |
| Olimpia | 2014 | Paraguayan Primera División | 6 | 1 | — | | — | | 0 | 0 | 6 | 1 |
| Olimpia | 2015 | Paraguayan Primera División | 0 | 0 | — | | 0 | 0 | 0 | 0 | 0 | 0 |
| Olimpia | 2016 | Paraguayan Primera División | 0 | 0 | — | | 0 | 0 | 0 | 0 | 0 | 0 |
| Olimpia | 2017 | Paraguayan Primera División | 0 | 0 | — | | 0 | 0 | 0 | 0 | 0 | 0 |
| Olimpia | 2018 | Paraguayan Primera División | 0 | 0 | 0 | 0 | 0 | 0 | 0 | 0 | 0 | 0 |
| Olimpia | Total | | 7 | 1 | 0 | 0 | 0 | 0 | 0 | 0 | 7 | 1 |
| General Caballero (loan) | 2016 | Paraguayan Primera División | 32 | 18 | — | | — | | 0 | 0 | 32 | 18 |
| Rubio Ñu (loan) | 2017 | Paraguayan Primera División | 6 | 0 | — | | — | | 0 | 0 | 6 | 0 |
| Sportivo Luqueño (loan) | 2017 | Paraguayan Primera División | 15 | 3 | — | | 0 | 0 | 0 | 0 | 15 | 3 |
| Sportivo Luqueño (loan) | 2018 | Paraguayan Primera División | 21 | 5 | 0 | 0 | 2 (Note: Appearance(s) in the Copa Sudamericana) | 0 | 0 | 0 | 23 | 5 |
| Sportivo Luqueño (loan) | Total | | 36 | 8 | 0 | 0 | 2 | 0 | 0 | 0 | 38 | 8 |
| Godoy Cruz (loan) | 2018–19 | Argentine Primera División | 5 | 0 | 0 | 0 | — | | 0 | 0 | 5 | 0 |
| San Luis | 2019 | Primera B | 0 | 0 | 0 | 0 | — | | 0 | 0 | 0 | 0 |
| Career total | | | 86 | 27 | 0 | 0 | 2 | 0 | 0 | 0 | 88 | 27 |
