= 2015 APF División de Honor =

Primera División
- Season: 2015
- Champions: Apertura: Cerro Porteño (31st title); Clausura: Olimpia (40th title)

The 2015 División Profesional season (officially the 2015 Copa TIGO- Visión Banco for sponsorship reasons) is the 81st season of top-flight professional football in Paraguay.

== Teams ==
=== Stadia and location ===
Locations of the 2015 Primera División teams

Team	Manager	Home city	Stadium	Capacity
Cerro Porteño	(Paraguay) Roberto Torres	Asunción	General Pablo Rojas	32,000
Deportivo Capiatá	(Paraguay) Humberto García	Capiatá	Capiatá	6,000
Deportivo Santaní	(Paraguay) Félix Darío León	San Estanislao	Juan José Vázquez	8,000
Guaraní	(Spain) Fernando Jubero	Asunción	Rogelio Livieres	6,000
General Díaz	(Argentina) Mario Jara	Luque	General Adrián Jara	3,500
Libertad	(Paraguay) Pedro Sarabia	Asunción	Dr. Nicolás Leoz	10,000
Nacional	(Switzerland) Daniel Raschle	Asunción	Arsenio Erico	4,000
Olimpia	(Paraguay) Francisco Arce	Asunción	Manuel Ferreira	15,000
Rubio Ñu	(Paraguay) Alicio Solalinde	Asunción	La Arboleda	5,000
San Lorenzo	(Paraguay) Héctor Marecos	San Lorenzo	Gunther Vogel	5,000
Sol de América	(Paraguay) Mario Jacquet	Villa Elisa	Luis Alfonso Giagni	5,000
Sportivo Luqueño	(Uruguay) Eduardo Rivera	Luque	Feliciano Cáceres	25,000

== Torneo Apertura ==
The Campeonato de Apertura, also the Copa TIGO-Visión Banco for sponsorship reasons, was the 112º official championship of the Primera División, called "Lic. Juan Ángel Napout", and is the first championship of the 2015 season. It began on January 30 and ended on May 31.

=== Standings ===
Pos	Team	Pld	W	D	L	GF	GA	GD	Pts	Qualification or relegation
1	Cerro Porteño	22	16	4	2	41	19	+22	52	2016 Copa Libertadores Second Stage
2	Guaraní	22	15	2	5	40	26	+14	47	
3	Libertad	22	10	8	4	30	23	+7	38	
4	Olimpia	22	9	8	5	32	22	+10	35	
5	Sportivo Luqueño	22	10	4	8	35	29	+6	34	
6	Sol de América	22	8	7	7	26	26	0	31	
7	Rubio Ñu	22	6	8	8	34	36	−2	26	
8	Nacional	22	5	7	10	28	37	−9	22	
9	Deportivo Santaní	22	4	9	9	27	33	−6	21	
10	General Díaz	22	5	6	11	26	32	−6	21	
11	Deportivo Capiatá	22	5	6	11	29	41	−12	21	
12	San Lorenzo	22	2	5	15	24	48	−24	11	

Updated to match(es) played on May 31, 2015. Source: APF
Rules for classification: 1st points. If two teams are tied on points, a playoff game will be held to break the tie. If more than two clubs are tied on points, the following will be used as a tiebreaker: 1st goal difference; 2nd goals scored; 3rd away-goals scored; 4th draw of lots

== Torneo Clausura ==
The Campeonato de Clausura, also the Copa TIGO-Visión Banco for sponsorship reasons, is the 113º official championship of the Primera División, called "Luis Óscar Giagni", and is the last championship of the 2015 season. It began on July 4 and ended on December 6.

=== Standings ===
Pos	Team	Pld	W	D	L	GF	GA	GD	Pts	Qualification or relegation
1	Olimpia	22	13	5	4	40	22	+18	44	2016 Copa Libertadores Second Stage
2	Cerro Porteño	22	14	2	6	32	23	+9	44	
3	Guaraní	22	12	3	7	52	29	+23	39	
4	Libertad	22	9	11	2	35	23	+12	38	
5	Deportivo Capiatá	22	9	6	7	31	34	−3	33	
6	Sol de América	22	7	5	10	35	35	0	26	
7	Deportivo Santaní	22	7	5	10	29	37	−8	26	
8	General Díaz	22	6	6	10	18	35	−17	24	
9	Sportivo Luqueño	22	6	5	11	39	43	−4	23	
10	Rubio Ñu	22	5	7	10	22	29	−7	22	
11	San Lorenzo	22	5	7	10	29	38	−9	22	
12	Nacional	22	5	6	11	21	35	−14	21	

Updated to match(es) played on December 5, 2015. Source: APF
Rules for classification: 1st points. If two teams are tied on points, a playoff game will be held to break the tie. If more than two clubs are tied on points, the following will be used as a tiebreaker: 1st goal difference; 2nd goals scored; 3rd away-goals scored; 4th draw of lots

=== Clausura play-off ===
Because Olimpia and Cerro Porteño tied with 44 points, a title play-off on neutral ground was played as the tournament rules specify.

December 9, 2015
18:00
Clausura play-off

Cerro Porteño	1–2	Olimpia

Defensores del Chaco, Asunción

== Aggregate table ==
Pos	Team	Pld	W	D	L	GF	GA	GD	Pts	Qualification or relegation
1	Cerro Porteño	44	30	6	8	73	42	+31	96	2016 Copa Libertadores Second Stage and 2016 Copa Sudamericana First Stage
2	Guaraní	44	27	5	12	92	55	+37	86	2016 Copa Libertadores First Stage
3	Olimpia	44	22	13	9	72	44	+28	79	2016 Copa Libertadores Second Stage
4	Libertad	44	19	19	6	65	46	+19	76	2016 Copa Sudamericana First Stage
6	Sol de América	44	15	12	17	61	61	0	57 (Note: Positions decided by draw, as both clubs agreed to not play the extra playoff game.)	2016 Copa Sudamericana First Stage
5	Sportivo Luqueño	44	16	9	19	74	72	+2	57	2016 Copa Sudamericana First Stage
7	Deportivo Capiatá	44	14	12	18	60	75	−15	54	
8	Rubio Ñú	44	11	15	18	56	65	−9	48	
9	Deportivo Santaní	44	11	14	19	56	70	−14	47	
10	General Díaz	44	11	12	21	44	67	−23	45	
11	Nacional	44	10	13	21	49	72	−23	43	
12	San Lorenzo	44	7	12	25	53	86	−33	33	

Updated to match(es) played on December 2015. Source:
Rules for classification: 1st points. If two teams are tied on points, a playoff game will be held to break the tie. If more than two clubs are tied on points, the following will be used as a tiebreaker: 1st goal difference; 2nd goals scored; 3rd away-goals scored; 4th draw of lots

== Relegation ==
Relegations is determined at the end of the season by computing an average of the number of points earned per game over the past three seasons. The two teams with the lowest average are relegated to the División Intermedia for the following season.

Pos	Team	2012 Pts	2013 Pts	2014 Pts	Total Pts	Total Pld	Avg	Relegation
1	Cerro Porteño	87	75	96	258	132	1.9545	
2	Guaraní	77	87	86	250	132	1.8939	
3	Libertad	75	96	76	247	132	1.8712	
4	Olimpia	55	63	79	197	132	1.4924	
5	Nacional	79	62	43	184	132	1.3939	
6	Sportivo Luqueño	54	63	57	174	132	1.3182	
7	Deportivo Capiatá	65	47	54	166	132	1.2576	
8	Sol de América	46	55	57	158	132	1.197	
9	General Díaz	61	48	45	154	132	1.1667	
10	Rubio Ñu	50	50	48	148	132	1.1212	
11	Deportivo Santaní	—	—	47	47	44	1.0682	Relegated to the División Intermedia
12	San Lorenzo	—	—	33	33	44	0.75	Relegated to the División Intermedia

Source: D10 Paraguay

== See also ==
- 2015 in Paraguayan football
