= 2016 APF División de Honor =

Primera División
- Season: 2016
- Champions: Apertura: Libertad (19th title); Clausura: Guaraní (11th title)
- Relegated: General Caballero; River Plate
- Copa Libertadores: Libertad; Guaraní; Olimpia; Deportivo Capiatá
- Copa Sudamericana: Cerro Porteño; Sol de América; Nacional; Sportivo Luqueño
- Top goalscorer: Apertura: Brian Montenegro (18 goals); Clausura: Ernesto Álvarez; Cecilio Domínguez (14 goals each)

The 2016 División Profesional season (officially the 2016 Copa TIGO-Visión Banco for sponsorship reasons) was the 82nd season of top-flight professional football in Paraguay.

== Teams ==
=== Stadia and location ===
Locations of the 2016 Primera División teams

Team	Manager	Home city	Stadium	Capacity
Cerro Porteño	(Paraguay) Gustavo Florentín	Asunción	General Pablo Rojas	32,000
Deportivo Capiatá	(Paraguay) Víctor Genes	Capiatá	Lic. Erico Galeano Segovia	10,000
General Caballero	(Paraguay) Robert Pereira	Asunción	Hugo Bogado Vaceque	5,000
General Díaz	(Paraguay) Humberto García	Luque	General Adrián Jara	3,500
Guaraní	(Argentina) Daniel Garnero	Asunción	Rogelio Livieres	6,000
Libertad	(Paraguay) Eduardo Villalba	Asunción	Dr. Nicolás Leoz	10,000
Nacional	(Paraguay) Ever Almeida	Asunción	Arsenio Erico	4,000
Olimpia	(Paraguay) Mauro Caballero	Asunción	Manuel Ferreira	15,000
River Plate	(Paraguay) Roberto Lugo	Asunción	River Plate	5,000
Rubio Ñu	(Uruguay) Gregorio Pérez	Asunción	La Arboleda	5,000
Sol de América	(Paraguay) Daniel Farrar	Villa Elisa	Luis Alfonso Giagni	5,000
Sportivo Luqueño	(Argentina) Mario Jara	Luque	Feliciano Cáceres	25,000

== Torneo Apertura ==
The Campeonato de Apertura, also the Copa TIGO-Visión Banco for sponsorship reasons, was the 113th official championship of the Primera División, called "Abraham Zapag", and the first championship of the 2016 season. It began on January 22 and ended on May 22.

=== Standings ===
Pos	Team	Pld	W	D	L	GF	GA	GD	Pts	Qualification or relegation
1	Libertad (C)	22	14	2	6	38	23	+15	44	2017 Copa Libertadores Group Stage
2	Olimpia	22	14	1	7	57	30	+27	43	
3	Sol de América	22	9	8	5	41	36	+5	35	
4	Guaraní	22	10	5	7	35	31	+4	35	
5	Rubio Ñu	22	10	3	9	31	32	−1	33	
6	Cerro Porteño	22	9	4	9	40	32	+8	31	
7	Deportivo Capiatá	22	8	6	8	42	42	0	30	
8	Sportivo Luqueño	22	7	6	9	28	31	−3	27	
9	General Caballero	22	7	5	10	36	47	−11	26	
10	General Díaz	22	6	6	10	32	44	−12	24	
11	Nacional	22	6	5	11	36	42	−6	23	
12	River Plate	22	3	7	12	17	43	−26	16	

Updated to match(es) played on May 25, 2016. Source: APF
Rules for classification: 1st points. If two teams are tied on points, a playoff game will be held to break the tie. If more than two clubs are tied on points, the following will be used as a tiebreaker: 1st goal difference; 2nd goals scored; 3rd away-goals scored; 4th drawing of lots
(C) Champions

=== Results ===
Home \ Away	CEP	CAP	GCA	GEN	GUA	LIB	NAC	OLI	RIV	RUB	SOL	SLU
Cerro Porteño		3–2	3–0	2–2	3–4	0–1	1–2	1–2	4–0	1–2	1–4	2–1
Deportivo Capiatá	0–2		3–2	2–1	0–2	0–2	2–4	3–5	1–1	2–2	1–1	1–0
General Caballero	2–4	3–7		5–1	0–1	0–2	1–3	2–1	2–3	0–1	1–1	0–0
General Díaz	2–5	2–2	1–3		3–2	1–0	1–1	4–1	3–0	0–2	2–1	2–2
Guaraní	0–0	0–3	1–2	3–0		1–3	1–0	0–2	4–2	3–1	2–1	3–2
Libertad	2–1	4–2	2–2	2–1	0–0		4–3	3–1	3–1	0–1	1–2	1–0
Nacional	1–1	0–1	2–3	1–3	2–1	1–3		2–2	0–0	3–1	0–3	1–1
Olimpia	0–1	1–3	7–1	4–1	3–2	1–0	3–1		3–0	4–1	6–0	2–0
River Plate	0–2	1–1	0–0	1–1	1–1	1–3	1–3	0–3		1–4	1–1	0–1
Rubio Ñu	1–0	1–2	1–2	0–0	2–2	2–0	2–1	1–4	1–2		0–2	1–2
Sol de América	2–2	3–2	3–3	3–1	0–0	2–1	4–3	2–1	0–1	1–2		3–3
Sportivo Luqueño	2–1	2–2	0–2	2–0	1–2	0–1	3–2	2–1	2–0	0–2	2–2	

Updated to match(es) played on May 25, 2016. Source: Soccerway
Legend: Blue = home team win; Yellow = draw; Red = away team win.

=== Top goalscorers ===
Rank	Name	Club	Goals
1	(Paraguay) Brian Montenegro	Nacional	18
2	(Paraguay) Santiago Salcedo	Libertad	13
3	(Paraguay) Roberto Gamarra	Deportivo Capiatá	12
3	(São Tomé and Príncipe) Luís Leal	Cerro Porteño	12
3	(Paraguay) William Mendieta	Olimpia	12
3	(Uruguay) Alejandro Silva	Olimpia	12

Source: Soccerway

== Torneo Clausura ==
The Campeonato de Clausura, also the Copa TIGO-Visión Banco for sponsorship reasons, was the 114h official championship of the Primera División, called "Centenario de la Conmebol", and the second championship of the 2016 season. It began on July 8 and ended on December 18.

=== Standings ===
Pos	Team	Pld	W	D	L	GF	GA	GD	Pts	Qualification or relegation
1	Guaraní (C)	22	15	3	4	32	19	+13	48	2017 Copa Libertadores Group Stage
2	Olimpia	22	14	5	3	44	22	+22	47	
3	Libertad	22	11	6	5	33	22	+11	39	
4	Deportivo Capiatá	22	10	7	5	33	25	+8	37	
5	Cerro Porteño	22	9	8	5	45	30	+15	35	
6	Nacional	22	9	4	9	33	34	−1	31	
7	Sol de América	22	7	7	8	32	34	−2	28	
8	Sportivo Luqueño	22	6	8	8	19	31	−12	26	
9	General Díaz	22	5	7	10	20	28	−8	22	
10	General Caballero	22	4	8	10	23	34	−11	20	
11	Rubio Ñu	22	3	6	13	15	27	−12	15	
12	River Plate	22	3	3	16	25	48	−23	12	

Updated to match(es) played on December 18, 2016. Source: APF, Soccerway
Rules for classification: 1st points. If two teams are tied on points, a playoff game will be held to break the tie. If more than two clubs are tied on points, the following will be used as a tiebreaker: 1st goal difference; 2nd goals scored; 3rd away-goals scored; 4th drawing of lots
(C) Champions

=== Results ===
Home \ Away	CEP	CAP	GCA	GEN	GUA	LIB	NAC	OLI	RIV	RUB	SOL	SLU
Cerro Porteño		2–1	1–2	2–3	1–3	2–1	1–1	1–1	4–0	1–0	2–2	4–1
Deportivo Capiatá	2–2		3–2	3–0	1–1	0–1	0–1	1–0	0–3	1–0	1–1	1–1
General Caballero	1–1	1–2		2–2	0–1	1–5	1–2	2–3	1–0	1–1	2–1	0–1
General Díaz	1–1	0–1	0–0		1–2	0–1	0–2	1–2	2–0	1–1	1–2	1–1
Guaraní	0–2	1–1	2–1	1–0		1–3	1–0	0–1	2–0	1–0	4–3	2–1
Libertad	1–1	1–1	1–0	2–1	0–1		3–0	2–2	1–1	2–1	0–0	1–2
Nacional	1–6	2–2	4–1	1–2	1–1	1–2		3–4	2–0	3–1	2–1	1–2
Olimpia	4–2	4–0	0–0	3–0	0–1	1–1	2–1		5–3	3–1	1–0	4–1
River Plate	2–3	2–4	1–1	0–0	0–2	2–0	2–3	0–2		0–2	2–4	0–2
Rubio Ñu	0–4	0–1	0–1	0–2	0–2	0–1	0–0	0–0	5–1		1–1	0–0
Sol de América	3–2	0–3	1–1	0–1	3–0	4–2	0–1	2–1	2–6	1–0		1–1
Sportivo Luqueño	0–0	0–4	2–2	1–1	0–3	0–2	2–1	0–1	1–0	0–2	0–0	

Updated to match(es) played on December 18, 2016. Source: Soccerway
Legend: Blue = home team win; Yellow = draw; Red = away team win.

=== Top goalscorers ===
Rank	Name	Club	Goals
1	(Paraguay) Ernesto Álvarez	Sol de América	14
1	(Paraguay) Cecilio Domínguez	Cerro Porteño	14
3	(Paraguay) Santiago Salcedo	Libertad	13
4	(Paraguay) Néstor Camacho	Guaraní	12
5	(Paraguay) Osmar Leguizamón	General Caballero	10
5	(Paraguay) William Mendieta	Olimpia	10

Source: Soccerway

== Aggregate table ==
Pos	Team	Pld	W	D	L	GF	GA	GD	Pts	Qualification or relegation
1	Olimpia	44	28	6	10	101	52	+49	90	2017 Copa Libertadores Second Stage
2	Libertad	44	25	8	11	71	45	+26	83	2017 Copa Libertadores Group Stage
3	Guaraní	44	25	8	11	67	50	+17	83	2017 Copa Libertadores Group Stage
4	Deportivo Capiatá	44	18	13	13	75	67	+8	67	2017 Copa Libertadores First Stage
5	Cerro Porteño	44	18	12	14	85	62	+23	66	2017 Copa Sudamericana First Stage
6	Sol de América	44	16	15	13	73	70	+3	63	2017 Copa Sudamericana First Stage
7	Nacional	44	15	9	20	69	76	−7	54	2017 Copa Sudamericana First Stage
8	Sportivo Luqueño	44	13	14	17	47	62	−15	53	2017 Copa Sudamericana First Stage
9	Rubio Ñu	44	13	9	22	46	59	−13	48	
10	General Díaz	44	11	13	20	52	72	−20	46	
11	General Caballero	44	11	13	20	59	81	−22	46	
12	River Plate	44	6	10	28	42	91	−49	28	

Updated to match(es) played on December 18, 2016. Source:
Rules for classification: 1st points. If two teams are tied on points, a playoff game will be held to break the tie. If more than two clubs are tied on points, the following will be used as a tiebreaker: 1st goal difference; 2nd goals scored; 3rd away-goals scored; 4th drawing of lots

== Relegation ==
Relegations is determined at the end of the season by computing an average of the number of points earned per game over the past three seasons. The two teams with the lowest average are relegated to the División Intermedia for the following season.

Pos	Team	2014 Pts	2015 Pts	2016 Pts	Total Pts	Total Pld	Avg	Relegation
1	Guaraní	87	86	83	256	132	1.9394	
2	Libertad	96	76	83	255	132	1.9318	
3	Cerro Porteño	75	96	66	237	132	1.7955	
4	Olimpia	63	79	90	232	132	1.7576	
5	Sol de América	55	57	63	175	132	1.3258	
6	Sportivo Luqueño	63	57	53	173	132	1.3106	
7	Deportivo Capiatá	47	54	67	168	132	1.2727	
8	Nacional	62	43	54	159	132	1.2045	
9	Rubio Ñu	50	48	48	146	132	1.1061	
10	General Díaz	48	45	46	139	132	1.053	
11	General Caballero (R)	—	—	46	46	44	1.0455	Relegated to the División Intermedia
12	River Plate (R)	—	—	28	28	44	0.6364	Relegated to the División Intermedia

Source: APF

== See also ==
- 2016 in Paraguayan football
