= 2024 Paraguayan Primera C =

Primera División C
- Season: 2024
- Dates: 5 May – TBC 2024

The Primera División C 2024 championship was the twenty-seventh official edition of Paraguay's Primera División C, one of the Fourth Division tournaments, organized by the Paraguayan Football Association.

A total of 12 teams competed in the championship.

== Competition system ==
This tournament maintains the same format as the previous seasons, operating as a double round-robin tournament. It consists of two separate phases of 11 rounds each, where every team plays against each other twice- once at home and once at away, for a total of 22 matches. The team which accumulates the most points at the end of the 22 matches is declared the champion.

In the event of a tie on points for the championship title between two teams, a single playoff match will be played to determine the winner. If three or more teams are tied in the standings, the positions are resolved using the following tie-breaking rules, in descending order:

1. Head-to-head points: Points obtained in the matches only played between the tied teams.
2. Head-to-head goal difference: Goal difference calculated exclusively from the matches played between the tied teams.
3. Goal difference: Total goal difference across the entire competition.
4. Highest number of goals scored: Goals scored in the overall competition.
5. A drawing of lots (Sorteo.)

== Qualification ==
- This tournament crowned the 27th champion in the history of the Primera División C.
- Both the champion and the runner-up earned direct promotion to the Third Division (Primera División B).
- Meanwhile, the club which finished last in the (relegation average) table was de-affiliated and suspended from competing for the following season.

== Promotions and relegations ==
=== Leaving the Primera C ===
Pos	Promoted to Primera B
1.º	12 de Octubre SD
2.º	Sport Colombia

Pos	Descheduled for one season
12º	General Caballero CG

=== Joining the Primera C ===
Pos	Relegated from Primera B
16.°	Sportivo Iteño
17.°	Humaitá

Pos	Returning descheduled team
12°	Deportivo Pinozá

== Teams ==
=== Location ===
The clubs are divided into two halves. The first half is distributed throughout the country's capital and the second through the Central Department.

Department	Quantity	Teams
Asunción	6	Sport Colonial, Atlético Juventud, Oriental, Valois Rivarola, Deportivo Pinozá, General Caballero ZC
Departamento Central	6	Fulgencio Yegros (Ñemby); 1° de Marzo (Fernando de la Mora); Sportivo Iteño (Itá); Capitán Figari (Lambaré); Pilcomayo y Humaitá (Mariano Roque Alonso)

=== Stadia ===
List of the teams that will compete in this tournament. The number of participating teams for this season is 12.

Team	City	Stadium	Capacity	Foundation
1° de Marzo	Fernando de la Mora	1° de marzo	2,000	1 March 1963
Sportivo Iteño	Itá	Salvador Morga	4,500	1 June 1924
Atlético Juventud	Asunción	Genaro Azcurra	2,000	28 August 1920
Capitán Figarí	Lambaré	Juan B. Ruíz Díaz	5,500	1 March 1931
Fulgencio Yegros	Ñemby	Parque Fulgencio Yegros	1,000	14 May 1924
General Caballero ZC	Asunción	Hugo Bogado Vaceque	5,000	6 September 1918
Humaitá	Mariano Roque Alonso	Pioneros de Corumba Cué	7,000	19 February 1932
Oriental	Asunción	Oriental	1,800	12 March 1912
Pilcomayo	Mariano Roque Alonso	Agustín Báez	800	9 June 1915
Deportivo Pinozá	Asunción	Alfredo Stroessner	80	11 January 1922
Sport Colonial	Asunción	Celestino Mongelós	600	18 January 1948
Valois Rivarola	Asunción	Gregorio Sarubbi	500	12 July 1936

== Standings ==
Pos	Team	Pld	W	D	L	GF	GA	GD	Pts	Qualification
1	Sportivo Iteño	6	4	2	0	12	3	+9	14	Promotion to Primera B
2	General Caballero ZC	6	4	1	1	8	4	+4	13	Promotion to Primera B
3	1° de Marzo	6	2	3	1	9	7	+2	9	
4	Humaitá	6	2	2	2	11	9	+2	8	
5	Atlético Juventud	6	2	2	2	5	5	0	8	
6	Sport Colonial	6	2	2	2	7	8	−1	8	
7	Fulgencio Yegros	6	2	1	3	9	6	+3	7	
8	Capitán Figari	6	1	4	1	8	7	+1	7	
9	Valois Rivarola	6	2	1	3	6	8	−2	7	
10	Oriental	6	2	0	4	7	17	−10	6	
11	Deportivo Pinozá	6	1	2	3	4	7	−3	5	
12	Pilcomayo	6	1	2	3	6	11	−5	5	

Updated to match(es) played on 9 June 2024. Source: APF

== Relegation ==
The average points of a club is the quotient obtained by dividing its accumulated score in the last three seasons in the division, by the number of games it has played during said period. This determines, at the end of each season, the team that will be deprogrammed for one year.

Updated on 8 June 2024

Pos.	Team	Average	Pts.	PG	'22	'23	'24
1º	Sportivo Iteño	2.200	11	5	-	-	11
2º	General Caballero ZC	1.893	53	28	-	40	13
3º	Capitán Figari	1.370	37	27	-	31	6
4º	Pilcomayo	1.360	68	50	40	23	5
5º	Deportivo Humaitá	1.333	8	6	-	-	8
6º	Fulgencio Yegros	1.333	36	27	-	32	4
7º	Oriental	1.306	64	49	28	30	6
8º	1° de Marzo	1.180	59	50	33	17	9
9º	Sport Colonial	1.180	56	50	26	25	8
10º	Atlético Juventud	0.959	47	49	17	23	7
11º	Valois Rivarola	0.939	46	49	17	22	7
12º	Deportivo Pinozá	0.833	5	6	-	-	5

In deprogramming zone for one year.
