= Óscar Ruiz =

Óscar Ruiz may refer to:

- Óscar Ruiz (footballer), Paraguayan footballer
- Óscar Ruiz (referee), Colombian football referee
- Oscar Ruiz-Tagle, Chilean politician
