= Hiroki Uchida =

Japanese footballer

Personal information
- Date of birth: 15 December 1990 (age 35)
- Place of birth: Chiba, Japan
- Height: 1.75 m (5 ft 9 in)
- Position: Forward

Team information
- Current team: Yokohama Fortress
- Number: 80

Youth career
- 2003–2007: ACC Yotsukaido
- 2007–2009: Teikyo High School
- 2009–2011: Japan Institute of Technology

Senior career*
Years	Team	Apps	(Gls)
2012–2013	Yokohama F. Marinos		
2013	Cerro Porteño PF		
2013	Huachipato	8	(0)
2014	Nihon Kogakuin F. Marinos		
2015	Deportivo Santaní	0	(0)
2016–	Yokohama Fortress	0	(0)
- * Club domestic league appearances and goals

Hiroki Uchida (内田 大貴, Uchida Hiroki; born 15 December 1990) is a Japanese footballer who plays as a forward for Yokohama Fortress Football Club in the Kanto Football League 1.

== Career ==
Uchida was born in Chiba.

=== Cerro Porteño PF ===
In 2012, Uchida was present with Cerro Porteño Presidente Franco in 2012 and was part of their squad for the 2013 Primera División Paraguaya season.

=== Huachipato ===
On 21 July 2013, Huachipato reported on their official website that they had signed Uchida for the 2013-14 Primera División Chilena season. Uchida's first league appearance for Huachipato came in a 0–1 home defeat against Santiago Wanderers on 27 July 2013. Uchida was substituted onto the field in the 77th minute for Carlos Labrin. On 8 September, Uchida was in the starting line up and played a full 90 minutes of a first-leg Copa Chile fixture against Concepción, the match ended 0–0. Huachipato eventually defeated Concepción on penalties in the second-leg. On 12 November, Uchida was again part of the starting line up and played another full 90 minutes in Huachipato's second round Copa Chile fixture away against Deportes Temuco. Huachipato went on to win 4–0. In the second leg on 19 November, Uchida again played a full 90 times as Huachipato defeated Deportes Temuco 2–0 at home, with an aggregate score line of 6–0. Uchida was yellow carded in the 56th minute of the match. Uchida's last league appearance for Huachipato was in a 3–2 away victory against Everton on 6 December 2013. Uchida was substituted onto the field for Francisco Arrue in the 80th minute. Uchida made 8 league appearances in total for Huachipato and 11 appearances in all competitions.

=== Deportivo Santaní ===
On 18 February 2015, it was announced that Primera División Paraguaya team Deportivo Santaní signed Uchida for the 2015 season. Uchida, who was being transferred from Nihon Kogakuin F. Marinos, and Mexican Alonso Collazo were both signed by the club at the same time and were the only two foreigners. It was published that Uchida could debut for Deportivo Santaní against Club Olimpia Asunción in the eighth round in a game to be played in Ciudad del Este. On 21 March 2015, Uchida stated his intention to continue playing in South America as the continent has a better level of football than his country. The player was yet to debut for the first-team of Deportivo Santaní but was eager to do so.

On 10 July 2015, Uchida was detached from Deportivo Santaní and was unable to return to Japan. Uchida could not speak much Spanish and visited Paraguayan newspaper ABC Color to inform the difficulty he was living due to his agent, Kazunori Sato, who abandoned the player. A letter that was signed by Uchida's lawyer revealed his problem and stated as to why the player could not return to Japan.

"During the five months of contract with Santaní, I haven't been able to receive my salaries and despite my requests of help from Mr. Sato, he only responds to me evasively, which is why I feel abandoned on my luck." – Uchida responded to his circumstances at Deportivo Santaní.

Uchida could not understand Spanish and explained that his agent included things in their contract which Uchida did not understand at the time. In the contract, Sato insterted a pay out sum of USD $18, 000.00 in order to release Uchida from his services. Uchida thanked Deportivo Santaní, who provided accommodation for him at the Victoria Complex in Ypacaraí and it was thanks to them that Uchida did not go hungry. However, Uchida explained that because of the loneliness and preoccupation he lost a lot of weight. He also explained that when Deportivo Santani would not stay at the Victoria Complex for concentration, Uchida had to abandon the place and stay at a hotel that he'd pay for from his own wallet. Uchida ultimately possessed the intention of appealing to the Asociación Paraguaya de Fútbol.

On 17 July 2015, it was reported that Uchida and Sato achieved an agreement and Uchida was able to regress to Japan, explaining that there had been a misunderstanding between his agent and himself. Both parties were able to converse and mutually discuss the contract which impeded Uchida in returning to Japan. Uchida stated that since February 2015, he had not been paid and that his agent took advantage of his lack of understanding in Spanish. He had not received contact from his agent.

Julio Scarone, a representative of Sato's, explained that Uchida had been in contact with Sato since 2012 whilst trialing with Cerro Porteño PF. Scarone explained that Sato brought Uchida from Spain and put him in a hotel, signing him with Deportivo Santaní. Scarone also denied that there was an agreement on a USD $18, 000.00 pay out sum, saying that when Uchida did not have money whilst in Spain and in Chile, Sato lent him USD $18, 000.00 and informed that he repay him when possible. Uchida confirmed that it was all a misunderstanding.

=== Yokohama Fortress ===
After returning to Japan, Uchida signs with Yokohama Fortress Football Club of the Kanto Football League 1.
