= James Freitas =

Brazilian football manager

Personal information
- Full name: James Francisco Freitas Iahnke
- Date of birth: 2 June 1968 (age 58)
- Place of birth: São Lourenço do Sul, Brazil

Managerial career
- Years: Team
- 2000: Grêmio (women)
- 2001: Internacional U17 (assistant)
- 2002: Brasil de Farroupilha U20
- 2003: São José de Cachoeira U20
- 2004: Santa Cruz-RS U20
- 2005–2008: Grêmio U17
- 2008–2009: Juventude U17
- 2009: Juventude U20
- 2009: Juventude (interim)
- 2010: Internacional U20
- 2011: Luverdense (assistant)
- 2011: Guaraní (assistant)
- 2011: Guaraní (interim)
- 2012–2013: Juventude U20
- 2012: Juventude B
- 2013–2015: Grêmio U20
- 2015: Grêmio (interim)
- 2015–2016: Grêmio (assistant)
- 2016: Grêmio (interim)
- 2017: Cruzeiro (assistant)
- 2018: Palmeiras (assistant)
- 2019: Cruzeiro (assistant)
- 2019–2020: Atlético Mineiro (assistant)
- 2020: Atlético Mineiro (interim)
- 2020–2021: Bahia (assistant)
- 2021: Fluminense (assistant)
- 2021–2022: Athletico Paranaense U23
- 2022–2023: Grêmio (assistant)
- 2023: Cerro Porteño (assistant)
- 2023–2024: Coritiba (assistant)
- 2024: Coritiba (interim)
- 2024–2025: Grêmio (assistant)
- 2025: Grêmio (interim)

James Francisco Freitas Iahnke (born 16 August 1968), known as James Freitas, is a Brazilian football coach.

== Career ==
Freitas was born in São Lourenço do Sul, Rio Grande do Sul, and started his career in lower clubs in his state, as a fitness coach. His first managerial experience came up in 2000, as he took over Grêmio's women squad.

After being an assistant of Internacional's under-17 squad, Freitas took over the under-20 sides of Brasil de Farroupilha, São José de Cachoeira and Santa Cruz-RS before returning to Grêmio in 2005, as manager of the under-17s. He left the club in 2008 for Juventude, being in charge of the under-17s and under-20s while also acting as an interim first team manager for one Série B match.

For the 2010 season, Freitas returned to Internacional, being named in charge of the under-20 team. In April of the following year, he was appointed Lisca's assistant at Luverdense.

In August 2011, Freitas moved abroad for the first time in his career, joining Paraguayan side Club Guaraní as Beto Almeida's assistant; in late November, as Almeida was sacked, he took over the side in an interim manner. He then returned to Juventude the following February, being again named in charge of the under-20s while also taking over the B-team.

Freitas then returned to Grêmio in 2013, being manager of the under-20s; in May 2015, he was named interim manager of the first team, as Luiz Felipe Scolari was sacked. He was in charge for two matches before the appointment of Roger Machado, and was later promoted to the role of permanent assistant manager of the first team. In 2016, as Roger was dismissed, he was again interim for a further three matches.

On 21 December 2016, Freitas was announced as Mano Menezes' assistant at Cruzeiro. The following November, he moved to Palmeiras under the same role, but returned to Cruzeiro on 15 February 2019.

In September 2019, Freitas moved to Cruzeiro's rivals Atlético Mineiro as an assistant manager and coordinator of a "transition team". The following 27 February, he was named interim manager of the first team, after the dismissal of Rafael Dudamel.

Returning to his previous role after the appointment of Jorge Sampaoli, Freitas was dismissed by Galo in March 2020. He was subsequently an assistant of Roger Machado at Bahia and Fluminense before being named manager of Athletico Paranaense's under-23 team on 27 November 2021.

On 8 February 2022, Freitas was dismissed after a poor start of the Campeonato Paranaense. He returned to Grêmio shortly after, as an assistant, and subsequently worked in the same role at Cerro Porteño, Coritiba and back at Grêmio.
