= Óscar Bóveda =

Paraguayan footballer (born 1989)

Personal information
- Full name: Óscar Adán Bóveda Rojas
- Date of birth: 16 January 1989 (age 37)
- Place of birth: Asunción, Paraguay
- Height: 1.84 m (6 ft 0 in)
- Position: Forward

Senior career*
Years	Team	Apps	(Gls)
2009	12 de Octubre	7	(0)
2010	Independiente F.B.C.	0	(0)
2011	3 de Febrero	2	(0)
2011	General Caballero	0	(0)
2012	Magallanes	9	(0)
Total		18	(0)
- * Club domestic league appearances and goals

Óscar Adán Bóveda Rojas (born 16 January 1989) is a Paraguayan former professional footballer who played as a forward.
