= Nelson Bernal =

Paraguayan goalkeeper coach (born 1972)

Nelson Germán Bernal (born 24 January 1972 in Paraguay) is a Paraguayan goalkeeper coach for Primera Division Paraguaya club 12 de Octubre Football Club and a former goalkeeper. Bernal retired from professional football in 2016 and returned as a fill-in goalkeeper for 12 de Octubre in the 2021 Primera Division Paraguaya season.

== Career ==
=== 2004 season ===
Bernal played for Guarani during the 2004 season, his last game for the club was against Cerro Porteño.

=== 2006 season ===
In 2006, Bernal was a goalkeeper for Club Sportivo San Lorenzo in the Primera B, the Paraguayan third-tier. Later, he was active until 2016 in San Lorenzos League, the Paraguayan fourth-tier.

=== 2021 season ===
On 20 February 2021, Bernal played five minutes of the 2021 season, coming on as a replacement for Mario Fleitas in a 5–0 defeat to Sol de America.
