= 2016 in Paraguayan football =

The 2016 season was the 106th season of competitive football in Paraguay.

== Primera División ==
- Torneo Apertura champions: Libertad (19^{th} title)
- Torneo Clausura champions: Guaraní (11^{th} title)

== División Intermedia ==
- Promoted as champions: Independiente de Campo Grande
- Promoted as runners-up: Sportivo Trinidense
- Relegated: Sportivo San Lorenzo
- Relegated: Sport Colombia

== Tercera División ==
=== Primera División B Metropolitana ===
- Champions: Martín Ledesma (Capiatá)

=== Primera División B Nacional ===
- Champions: 22 de Setiembre (Encarnación)
- Runners-up: R.I. 3 Corrales (Ciudad del Este)

== Cuarta División ==
- Champions: Pilcomayo

== Transfers ==
- List of transfers during the 2016 season registered under the Asociación Paraguaya de Fútbol.
