= Fabricio Bassa =

Uruguayan football manager

Personal information
- Full name: Fabricio Nicolás Bassa Carrero
- Date of birth: 2 August 1979 (age 47)
- Place of birth: Uruguay

Managerial career
- Years: Team
- 2012: Sportivo Iteño
- 2015-2016: Club Guaraní
- 2018: Atlas F.C. (director)

Fabricio Bassa (born 2 August 1979 in Uruguay) is a Uruguayan football manager who last worked as director of Atlas in Mexico.

== Career ==
Bassa started his managerial career with Sportivo Iteño. In 2015, he was appointed head coach of Club Guaraní in the Paraguayan Primera División, a position he held until 2016.
