= Estadio Hugo Bogado Vaceque =

Sports venue in Asunción, Paraguay

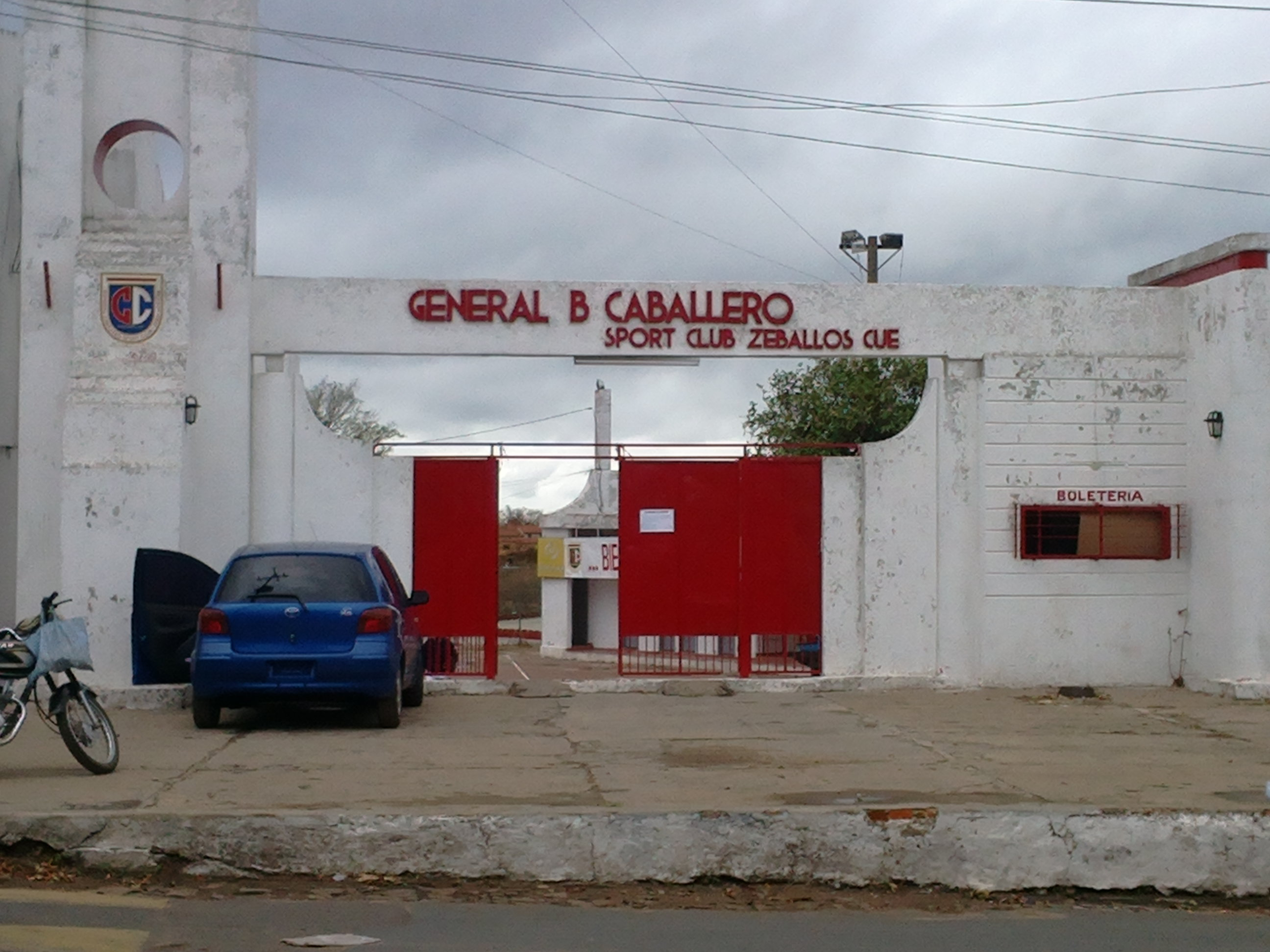
- Interactive map of Estadio Hugo Bogado Vaceque
- Full name: Estadio Hugo Bogado Vaceque
- Location: Asunción, Paraguay
- Coordinates: 25.2357966°S 57.5577479°W
- Capacity: 5,000
- Surface: natural grass

Construction
- Built: 1918

Tenant
- Club General Caballero

Estadio Hugo Bogado Vaceque is a multi-use stadium in the Zeballos Cué barrio of Asunción, Paraguay. It is the home ground of the Club General Caballero of Primera División de Paraguay. The stadium holds 5,000 spectators and opened in 1918.

The name comes from one of its presidents, José Hugo Bogado Vaceque.
