= Zeballos Cué =

Coordinates: 25.23245°S 57.56819°W

- Barrio
- Interactive map of Zeballos Cué
- Country: Paraguay
- Autonomous Capital District: Gran Asunción
- City: Asunción

Area
  - Total: 1.07 km^{2} (0.41 sq mi)
- Elevation: 43 m (141 ft)

Population
  - Total: 18,553

Zeballos Cué is a neighbourhood (barrio) of Asunción, Paraguay.

== Geography ==
Limits

- Paraguay River to the north
- Loma Pytá neighbourhood to the south
- Mariano Roque Alonso City to the east
- Bótanico neighbourhood to the west
