= Victor Matta =

Paraguayan footballer (born 1990)

Victor Hugo Matta (born 21 April 1990) is a Paraguayan footballer who plays as a midfielder.

== Career ==
=== Olimpia Asunción ===
Born in Asunción, Matta emerged through Olimpia Asunción's youth system. Whilst at the Olimpia Asunción reserve team, Matta was coached by Mauro Caballero, who took him to the first squad. In 2011, Matta was in Olimpia Asunción's championship winning team. Matta appeared on the bench in both of Olimpia Asunción's 2012 Copa Sudamericana home and away games against Uruguayan team Danubio in July and August. In February 2013, Matta was added to Olimpia Asunción's first team, as were Alberto Contrera, Argentine Emanuel Biancucchi, Miguel Angel Montorfaro and Colombian Yair Ibarguen. In September 2013, Matta was joined by his brother, Marcelo, in the Olimpia Asunción first squad.

=== General Díaz ===
On 27 August 2014, Matta appeared on the bench for General Díaz in a 2–2 away draw against Chile team Cobresal in the Copa Sudamericana. On 2 April 2016, Matta played in his last Primera División Paraguaya game for General Díaz in a 7–3 home defeat against Deportivo Capiatá, appearing in the roster's starting line-up.

=== General Caballero ZC ===
Following General Caballero ZC, Matta left football for close to one year and a half.

=== Tacuary ===
At Tacuary, Matta achieved two consecutive promotions.

== Style of play ==
Matta plays as a mixed winger, on the left and right.

== Personal life ==
Matta's idol is former Barcelona footballer Xavi.

Before and following the 2020 COVID-19 pandemic, Matta studied architecture at the Universidad Americana. Matta studied accounting for two years, and while in the 2020 COVID-19 pandemic, he worked as an assistant accountant to his father.
