= 2017 in Paraguayan football =

The 2017 season is the 107th season of competitive football in Paraguay.

== División Intermedia ==
- Promotoed as Winners: 3 de Febrero
- Promoted as Runners Up: Deportivo Santaní
- Relegated: Deportivo Caacupé
- Relegated: Olimpia Itá

== Tercera División ==
=== Primera División B Metropolitana ===
- Promoted as Winners: Sportivo San Lorenzo
- Promotion Play-off: Colegiales
- Relegated: Benjamín Aceval
- Relegated: Cerro Corá

=== Primera División B Nacional ===
- Promoted as Winners: 2 de Mayo
- Promotion Play-off: R.I 3 Corrales

=== Promotion play-off ===
- Colegiales 3–3 R.I 3 Corrales on aggregate. Corrales won 4–2 on penalties.

== Transfers ==
- List of transfers during the 2017 season registered under the Asociación Paraguaya de Fútbol.
