= Jorge Samaniego =

Jorge Samaniego (1947 – August 12, 1987) was a Cuban-American dancer with the New York City Opera Ballet, Western Ballet, Nederlands Dans Theater, and Milwaukee Ballet. He choreographed for Puerto Rican Dance Theater and the Des Moines Ballet in Iowa. In 1981 he choreographed a PBS production of Romeo and Juliet, in which he played the role of Mercutio. His company was called the Samaniego Dance Gallery, established in 1977. Dance Magazine reports: "His annual stagings of A Christmas Carol, Peter and the Wolf, and The Nutcracker were holiday favorites in southern California."

== Early life ==
Jorge Samaniego was born in 1947 in Cuba. He studied at Los Angeles’s American School of Dance before moving to New York, where he performed with the New York Metropolitan Opera Ballet.

== Career ==
The Des Moines Ballet was founded in 1966 with the express purpose of providing training and performance opportunities for young dancers in the area. In 1978, the Board of Directors directed their attention towards a more professional presentation and retained Jorge Samaniego as Artistic Director and Kenneth MacDonald (December 31, 1948 - April 20, 1995) as Associate Artistic Director. Samaniego had been the ballet master and choreographed for the Milwaukee Ballet. The size of the performing body was reduced and one year after the change in artistic direction, the Association elected to support professional dancers on a seasonal contract. The dancers included Samaniego and MacDonald plus six additional young performers. Three were from Des Moines and three were from other parts of the country. In addition to these performers, the company included lighting and set designer Wayne Mikos, costume designer Donette Yeaton, and business manager, Kay McElrath.

Samaniego's task had been to take the company to a higher level of professional development. His background as a performer with the New York City Opera Ballet, the Netherlands Dance Ballet Theater, and the Milwaukee Lar Lubovitch Dance Company provided the necessary professional experience to facilitate this task. In addition, he choreographed for Milwaukee and Princeton ballets and for the Puerto Rican dance theater. MacDonald complemented Samaniego's efforts with his own training with American Concert Ballet, Lottie Gosslar, and the Milwaukee Ballet.

Jorge Samaniego chose to create his own works for the company to perform. The titles of his works Isolations, Tocata and Fugue, Rhapsody in Blue, Adam and Eve ... A Rib, and The Times They Are A-Dancing, suggested a range of ballets that include pure movement works, comic and whimsical dances, and those which probe the conflicting forces of modern life. Samaniego's choreography exhibited sufficient variety and artistic depth to satisfy the dancers and their growing audiences.

Samaniego moved back to Los Angeles in 1984 and reestablished his Dance Gallery, which performed regularly at the Assistance League Playhouse.

== Personal life ==
Jorge Samaniego died on August 12, 1987. Both Dance Magazine and the Los Angeles Times obituaries list Samaniego's companion, Kenneth MacDonald, as a survivor. MacDonald grew up in San Mateo County and met Samaniego at a ballet studio in Los Angeles in the early 1970s. They were together for 14 years. On the AIDS quilt MacDonald did for Samaniego, he wrote: "To Jorge Samaniego, my tears, my love, Kenneth." Kenneth MacDonald died of AIDS on April 20, 1995. On another panel, they are listed together, side by side.
