= Beto Almeida =

Brazilian football manager (born 1955)

Personal information
- Full name: Roberto de Almeida
- Date of birth: April 5, 1955 (age 71)
- Place of birth: Porto Alegre, Brazil

Team information
- Current team: Grêmio U20 (manager)

Managerial career
- Years: Team
- 1998–1999: Kawasaki Frontale
- 2006: Porto Alegre
- 2006: São José-RS
- 2007: Esportivo
- 2007: Juventude
- 2008: Brasil de Pelotas
- 2008: CRAC-MT
- 2009: Veranópolis
- 2010–2011: Juventude
- 2011: Guaraní
- 2012–2013: Pelotas
- 2013: CSA
- 2014: São Luiz
- 2014: ASA
- 2015: União Frederiquense
- 2016: Grêmio U17
- 2017–: Grêmio U20

Roberto de Almeida (born April 5, 1955), commonly known as Beto Almeida, is a Brazilian football manager.

== Managerial statistics ==
Team	From	To	Record				
Team	From	To	G	W	D	L	Win %
Kawasaki Frontale	1999	1999	5	1	1	3	20.00
Total			5	1	1	3	20.00
