= Aldo Bobadilla =

Paraguayan footballer (born 1976)

Personal information
- Full name: Aldo Antonio Bobadilla Ávalos
- Date of birth: 20 April 1976 (age 50)
- Place of birth: Pedro Juan Caballero, Paraguay
- Height: 1.92 m (6 ft 4 in)
- Position: Goalkeeper

Senior career*
Years	Team	Apps	(Gls)
1997–2004	Cerro Porteño	198	(0)
2005	Gimnasia La Plata	19	(0)
2005–2006	Libertad	28	(0)
2006–2007	Boca Juniors	20	(0)
2007–2010	Independiente Medellín	108	(0)
2010	Corinthians	0	(0)
2011	Olimpia	22	(0)
Total		395	(0)

International career
1999–2010	Paraguay	19	(0)

Managerial career
- 2012–2013: Rubio Ñu (youth)
- 2013: San Lorenzo
- 2013–2015: General Caballero ZC
- 2015: Carapeguá
- 2015: Sportivo Trinidense
- 2015–2016: General Caballero ZC
- 2016: Sportivo Trinidense
- 2016: General Caballero ZC
- 2016–2017: General Díaz
- 2017: Olimpia
- 2018: Libertad
- 2018: General Díaz
- 2019: Nacional
- 2019–2020: Independiente Medellín
- 2020–2023: Paraguay U17
- 2020–2023: Paraguay U20
- 2023: Tacuary
- 2024: Tacuary
- 2024–2025: Sportivo Ameliano
- * Club domestic league appearances and goals

Aldo Antonio Bobadilla Ávalos (born 20 April 1976) is a Paraguayan football manager and former player who played as a goalkeeper.

== Club career ==
Bobadilla started his career at Paraguayan club Cerro Porteño already in the junior league, he was trained by Modesto Sandoval that is how he got the skills to play in the pro team some years later, then moved to Gimnasia y Esgrima de La Plata of Argentina. He returned to Paraguay to play for Club Libertad until mid-2006, when he signed for Argentine Boca Juniors.

Though he started the last season as the first-choice goalkeeper for Boca Juniors, he lost his place to Caranta after his rival's good performances in friendly matches.

In early September 2007 he signed a contract with Colombian side Independiente Medellín helping the team overcome the problem they had in the previous season by being the team with the most goals scored against.

Early in 2011, Bobadilla signed a two-year contract with Club Olimpia of Asunción. After Olimpia finishing in second place during that year's Apertura Tournament, Bobadilla decided to end his career, starting to take managerial jobs with Paraguayan lower-ranking teams.

== International career ==
Bobadilla was part of the Paraguay national team that competed in the 2006 FIFA World Cup. He went as a substitute and was not expected to play. However, Bobadilla had to replace starting goalkeeper Justo Villar after Villar's injury in the first match, against England.

== Personal life ==
Aldo is father of the midfielder Damián Bobadilla.

== Honours ==
Cerro Porteño

- Paraguayan Primera División (2): 2001, 2004

Libertad

- Paraguayan Primera División (1): 2006

Boca Juniors

- Recopa Sudamericana (1): 2006
- Copa Libertadores (1): 2007

Independiente Medellín

- Categoría Primera A (1): 2009 Finalización
