= Botánico =

Coordinates: 25.2439°S 57.5706°W

- Barrio
- Interactive map of Botánico
- Country: Paraguay
- Autonomous Capital District: Gran Asunción
- City: Asunción

Botánico is a neighbourhood (barrio) of Asunción, Paraguay.
