= 2015 in Paraguayan football =

The 2015 season is the 105th season of competitive football in Paraguay.

== Transfers ==
- List of transfers during the 2015 season registered under the Asociación Paraguaya de Fútbol.

== National team ==
26 March 2015 Friendly	Costa Rica	0 – 0	Paraguay	San José, Costa Rica
		Report		Stadium: Estadio Nacional; Referee: John Pitti (Panama)

31 March 2015 Friendly	Mexico	1 – 0	Paraguay	Kansas City, USA
20:00 UTC-6	E. Herrera 3'	Report		Stadium: Arrowhead Stadium; Attendance: 38,144; Referee: Walter López (Guatemala)

6 June 2015 Friendly	Paraguay	2 – 2	Honduras	Asunción, Paraguay
20:15	Santa Cruz 20', 56'	Report	Santa Cruz 8' (o.g.); Castillo 23'	Stadium: Estadio Manuel Ferreira; Attendance: 9,500; Referee: Fernando Falce (Uruguay)

13 June 2015 2015 Copa América	Argentina	2 – 2	Paraguay	La Serena, Chile
18:30 (UTC−3)	Agüero 28'; Messi 35' (pen.)	Report	Valdez 59'; Barrios 89'	Stadium: Estadio La Portada; Attendance: 16,281; Referee: Wilmar Roldán (Colombia)

16 June 2015 2015 Copa América	Paraguay	1 – 0	Jamaica	Antofagasta, Chile
18:00 (UTC−3)	E. Benítez 35'	Report		Stadium: Estadio Regional de Antofagasta; Attendance: 6,099; Referee: Carlos Vera (Ecuador)

20 June 2015 2015 Copa América	Uruguay	1 – 1	Paraguay	La Serena, Chile
16:00 (UTC−3)	Giménez 28'	Report	Barrios 44'	Stadium: Estadio La Portada; Attendance: 16,021; Referee: Roberto García (Mexico)

27 June 2015 2015 Copa América	Brazil	1 – 1 (3 – 4 p)	Paraguay	Concepción, Chile
18:30 (UTC−3)	Robinho 14'	Report	González 72' (pen.)	Stadium: Estadio Municipal de Concepción; Referee: Andrés Cunha (Uruguay)
	Penalties
	Fernandinho (penalty scored); Ribeiro (penalty missed); Miranda (penalty scored); Douglas Costa (penalty missed); Coutinho (penalty scored)		(penalty scored) Martínez; (penalty scored) M. Cáceres; (penalty scored) Bobadilla; (penalty missed) Santa Cruz; (penalty scored) González

June 30, 2015 2015 Copa América	Argentina	6 – 1	Paraguay	Concepción, Chile
20:30 (UTC−3)	Rojo 15'; Pastore 27'; Di María 47', 53'; Agüero 80'; Higuaín 83'	Report	Barrios 43'	Stadium: Estadio Municipal de Concepción; Attendance: 29,205; Referee: Sandro Ricci (Brazil)

July 3, 2015 2015 Copa América	Peru	2 – 0	Paraguay	Concepción, Chile
20:30 (UTC−3)	Carrillo 48'; Guerrero 89'	Report		Stadium: Estadio Municipal de Concepción; Attendance: 29,143; Referee: Raúl Orosco (Bolivia)

September 5 Friendly	Chile	3 – 2	Paraguay	Santiago, Chile
18:00 (UTC−3)	Gutiérrez 8', 64'; Sánchez 82'	Report	Fabbro 51'; Benítez 53'	Stadium: Estadio Nacional Julio Martínez Prádanos; Referee: Mauro Vigliano (Argentina)

8 October 2015 2018 FIFA WCQ	Venezuela	0 – 1	Paraguay	Ciudad Guayana, Venezuela
			Derlis González 85'	Stadium: Estadio Cachamay

13 October 2015 2018 FIFA WCQ	Paraguay	0 – 0	Argentina	Asunción, Paraguay
				Stadium: Estadio Defensores del Chaco

November 2015 2018 FIFA WCQ	Peru	1 – 0	Paraguay	Lima, Peru
				Stadium: Estadio Nacional

November 2015 2018 FIFA WCQ	Paraguay	2 – 1	Bolivia	Asunción, Paraguay
				Stadium: Estadio Defensores del Chaco

Win Draw Loss
