= Gustavo Florentín =

Paraguayan footballer and manager (born 1978)

Personal information
- Full name: Gustavo Atilano Florentín Morínigo
- Date of birth: 30 June 1978 (age 48)
- Place of birth: San Antonio, Paraguay
- Height: 1.73 m (5 ft 8 in)
- Position: Defender

Team information
- Current team: Oriente Petrolero (manager)

Senior career*
Years	Team	Apps	(Gls)
- Sud America de Paraguarí
1996–1998	Cerro Porteño		
1999–2000	12 de Octubre		
2000–2001	Sportivo San Lorenzo		
2001	Colegiales		
2002	Recoleta		
2002–2003	Sol de América		
2003	Farul Constanța		
2004	Sportivo Luqueño		
2005–2006	Fernando de la Mora	11	(1)
2006–2007	Guaraní		
2008	Tacuary		

International career
1997	Paraguay U20		

Managerial career
- 2009–2012: Cerro Porteño (youth)
- 2013–2015: Cerro Porteño (assistant)
- 2015: Cerro Porteño (interim)
- 2016–2017: Cerro Porteño
- 2017–2018: Deportivo Capiatá
- 2018: Sportivo Luqueño
- 2018: Guaraní
- 2019–2021: Huachipato
- 2021: Sol de América
- 2021: The Strongest
- 2021–2022: Sport Recife
- 2022: General Caballero JLM
- 2023: Sportivo Luqueño
- 2024: Deportivo Pasto
- 2025: Atlético Bucaramanga
- 2025: Águilas Doradas
- 2026: Jaguares de Córdoba
- 2026–: Oriente Petrolero
- * Club domestic league appearances and goals

Gustavo Atilano Florentín Morínigo (born 30 June 1978) is a Paraguayan football manager and former player who played as a defender. He is the current manager of Bolivian club Oriente Petrolero.

== Playing career ==
Born in San Antonio, Florentín started playing for Paraguarí-based side Sud América before joining Cerro Porteño in 1996. He rarely settled for a club during his career, representing local sides 12 de Octubre, Sportivo San Lorenzo, Colegiales, Recoleta, Sol de América, Sportivo Luqueño, Fernando de la Mora, Guaraní and Tacuary. He also spent a short time abroad in 2003, representing Romanian side Farul Constanța.

At the international level, Florentín played for the under-20 national team in the 1997 FIFA World Youth Championship in Malaysia.

== Managerial career ==
After retiring, Florentin began coaching in 2009 with Cerro Porteño, being in charge of their youth categories. In 2013, he became the main squad's assistant manager, and was also an interim manager in November 2015 after Roberto Torres left.

Florentín returned to his previous duties after the appointment of César Farías, but was named manager in July 2016 after Gustavo Morínigo was sacked. On 6 March of the following year, he was himself dismissed.

On 11 September 2017, Florentín was appointed manager of Deportivo Capiatá also in the Primera División. He resigned the following 27 May, and took over fellow league team Sportivo Luqueño on 9 June.

On 10 September 2018, Florentín left Luqueño to take over Guaraní. He left the club on a mutual consent on 29 May of the following year, and was appointed in charge of Chilean Primera División side Huachipato on 11 July.

In December 2020, Florentín was hugely criticized after his post-match comments related to substituting off Antonio Castillo in the first-half of a 2–2 home draw against Colo Colo, where he stated that "if a footballer is not brave, he is not in the right occupation". He was sacked by Huachipato on 6 January 2021.

Florentín returned to his home country on 17 February 2021, to manage Sol de América. He opted to leave the latter on 23 March 2021, and was presented at the helm of The Strongest on 26 April.

On 15 August 2021, Florentín resigned from the Tigre, and switched teams and countries again eleven days later after taking over Campeonato Brasileiro Série A side Sport Recife. Despite suffering relegation, he was kept as manager for the 2022 season, but was sacked nonetheless on 3 March of that year.

On 8 August 2022, Florentín was presented as manager of General Caballero JLM in his home country, but resigned on 16 September. On 27 October, he took over Sportivo Luqueño, newly promoted to the top tier, but resigned on 30 May 2023.

On 8 April 2024, he was appointed as manager of Deportivo Pasto, in the Colombian Categoría Primera A.

== Managerial statistics ==
As of 23 April 2025

Managerial record by team and tenure
Team	Nat.	From	To	Record								Ref
Team	Nat.	From	To	G	W	D	L	GF	GA	GD	Win %	Ref
Cerro Porteño (interim)	(Paraguay)	24 November 2015	15 December 2015	3	2	0	1	5	4	+1	66.67	
Cerro Porteño	(Paraguay)	16 July 2016	6 March 2017	35	16	11	8	65	38	+27	45.71	
Deportivo Capiatá	(Paraguay)	11 September 2017	27 May 2018	34	11	10	13	44	51	−7	32.35	
Sportivo Luqueño	(Paraguay)	9 June 2018	10 September 2018	10	4	2	4	17	14	+3	40.00	
Guaraní	(Paraguay)	10 September 2018	29 May 2019	42	18	13	11	67	49	+18	42.86	
Huachipato	(Chile)	11 July 2019	6 January 2021	41	15	11	15	48	51	−3	36.59	
Sol de América	(Paraguay)	17 February 2021	23 March 2021	6	1	2	3	8	9	−1	16.67	
The Strongest	(Bolivia)	26 April 2021	15 August 2021	15	9	0	6	21	22	−1	60.00	
Sport Recife	(Brazil)	26 August 2021	3 March 2022	29	9	8	12	26	31	−5	31.03	
General Caballero (JLM)	(Paraguay)	8 August 2022	16 September 2022	7	1	2	4	6	12	−6	14.29	
Sportivo Luqueño	(Paraguay)	27 October 2022	31 May 2023	20	5	8	7	23	26	−3	25.00	
Deportivo Pasto	(Colombia)	8 April 2024	13 December 2024	33	13	7	13	40	34	+6	39.39	
Atlético Bucaramanga	(Colombia)	18 December 2024	14 March 2025	10	1	5	4	4	10	−6	10.00	
Águilas Doradas	(Colombia)	22 March 2025	23 April 2025	6	1	3	2	3	4	−1	16.67	
Career total				291	106	82	103	377	355	+22	36.43	—

== Honours ==
=== Manager ===
Guaraní

- Copa Paraguay: 2018
