= Fernando Ortiz (footballer, born 1977) =

Argentine footballer and manager

Personal information
- Date of birth: 25 December 1977 (age 48)
- Place of birth: Corral de Bustos, Argentina
- Height: 1.86 m (6 ft 1 in)
- Position: Centre-back

Team information
- Current team: Colo-Colo (head coach)

Youth career
- Sportivo Corral de Bustos

Senior career*
Years	Team	Apps	(Gls)
1998–2001	Boca Juniors	3	(2)
1999	→ Mallorca B (loan)	13	(0)
1999–2000	→ San Lorenzo (loan)	22	(0)
2000–2001	→ Unión (loan)	30	(1)
2001–2004	Unión	57	(1)
2003–2004	→ Banfield (loan)	38	(4)
2004–2006	Estudiantes LP	79	(5)
2007–2008	Santos Laguna	80	(6)
2009–2010	América	15	(1)
2009–2010	→ Tigres UANL (loan)	21	(0)
2010–2012	Vélez Sársfield	59	(2)
2012–2014	Racing	45	(2)
Total		462	(24)

Managerial career
- 2016: Estudiantes (B-team)
- 2017: Sol de América
- 2018: Sportivo Luqueño
- 2018: Sol de América
- 2022: América (under-20)
- 2022: América (Interim)
- 2022–2023: América
- 2023–2024: Monterrey
- 2025: Santos Laguna
- 2025–: Colo-Colo
- * Club domestic league appearances and goals

Fernando Damián Ortiz (born 25 December 1977) is an Argentine professional football manager and former footballer. He is the current manager of Chilean club Colo-Colo.

== Playing career ==
Ortiz was spotted by Argentine giants Boca Juniors in 1997. He made his debut in 1998, and helped Boca to win the Primera División 1998 Apertura championship. He played eight games for Boca in all competitions, scoring three goals.

In 1999, he was loaned to RCD Mallorca in Spain, where he played half-a-season for their B team (RCD Mallorca B). He returned that same year to Argentina to play for San Lorenzo. Subsequently, he had spells at Unión de Santa Fe and Banfield, before joining Estudiantes de La Plata in 2004.

Ortiz helped Estudiantes to win the 2006 Apertura. He was a starter in the championship playoff played against his former club Boca Juniors on 13 December, that Estudiantes won 2–1. Shortly after being crowned champion in Argentina, Ortiz signed with Mexican side Santos Laguna along with other players in order to help the team avoid relegation. He left Santos Laguna to join Club América on 17 December 2008.

In August 2010, Ortiz returned to Argentina to play for Vélez Sársfield. Ortiz was a regular starter along Sebastián Domínguez in Vélez Sársfield's centre back during his two-year stay at the club, in which he won with the team the 2011 Clausura and reached the semifinals of the 2011 Copa Libertadores and quarter-finals of the 2012 Copa Libertadores.

Aged 34, Ortiz did not renew his contract with Vélez after it expired in June 2012, signing instead for Racing. However, despite a "free agent", Racing had to pay a fee to Sud América, a proxy club for an unknown third parties. Racing received a warning for the transfer. After not being able to fully recover from a knee injury, he officially announced his retirement in 2014, and began his studies to become a coach.

== Managerial career ==
Ortiz began his managerial career in 2016, being in charge of the Estudiantes reserve side. His first role as manager of a senior squad came the following year, being appointed manager of Paraguayan side Sol de América. He had a brief stint with Sportivo Luqueño in 2018 before returning to Sol de América that same year.

In January 2022, Ortiz moved to Mexico and was announced as the new head coach of the Club América Under-20 side. On 3 March, Ortiz was appointed interim manager of the first team following the dismissal of Santiago Solari. On 21 May 2023, after losing in the semifinals to Chivas, Ortiz said, "As far as my staff and I are concerned, this is the end of an era here at Club America."

On 29 May 2023, Monterrey appointed Ortiz as their new manager. On 6 August 2024, Ortiz was dismissed from his position following an underwhelming group stage exit from the Leagues Cup.

On 23 November 2024, Santos Laguna announced Ortiz as their new head coach for the upcoming tournament. On 5 May 2025, he was relieved from his pos.

In September 2025, Ortiz was appointed as the head coach of Colo-Colo in Chile. In November 2026, he won his first title as manager after leading the club to their 35th league championship.

== Managerial statistics ==
As of match played 8 November 2026

Managerial record by team and tenure
Team	Nat	From	To	Record					Ref
Team	Nat	From	To	P	W	D	L	Win %	Ref
Sol de América	(Paraguay)	2 January 2017	13 August 2017	30	10	12	8	33.3	
Sportivo Luqueño	(Paraguay)	4 April 2018	29 May 2018	9	2	1	6	22.2	
Sol de América	(Paraguay)	5 June 2018	25 August 2018	10	2	4	4	20.0	
América U20	(Mexico)	5 January 2022	3 March 2022	5	2	1	2	40.0	
América	(Mexico)	3 March 2022	21 May 2023	55	32	14	9	58.2	
Monterrey	(Mexico)	29 May 2023	6 August 2024	61	35	11	15	57.4	
Santos Laguna	(Mexico)	23 November 2024	5 May 2025	17	2	1	14	11.8	
Colo-Colo	(Chile)	30 August 2025	present	52	33	8	11	63.5	
Total				239	118	52	69	49.4	

== Honours ==
=== Club ===
Boca Juniors

- Argentine Primera División (1): 1998 Apertura

Estudiantes LP

- Argentine Primera División (1): 2006 Apertura

Santos Laguna

- Mexican Primera División (1): 2008 Clausura

Vélez Sársfield

- Argentine Primera División (1): 2011 Clausura

=== Manager ===
Colo-Colo

- Chilean Primera División: 2026

=== Individual ===
- Mexican Primera División Best Central Defender: 2008 Clausura
