= General Caballero Sport Club =

Paraguayan football club

General Caballero
- Full name: General Caballero Sport Club de Zeballos Cué
- Nickname: Los Rojos
- Founded: September 6, 1918
- Ground: Estadio Hugo Bogado Vaceque; Zeballos Cué, Asunción, Paraguay
- Capacity: 5,000
- League: Primera División B
- 2018: División Intermedia, 13th (Relegated by average)
Home colours	Away colours

General Caballero Sport Club, also referred as General Caballero ZC, is an association football club from Zeballos Cué, Asunción, Paraguay. The club was founded September 6, 1918 and plays in the Primera División B, the third division of the Paraguayan football league. Their home games are played at the Estadio Hugo Bogado Vaceque which has a capacity of approximately 5,000 seats.

== Stadium ==
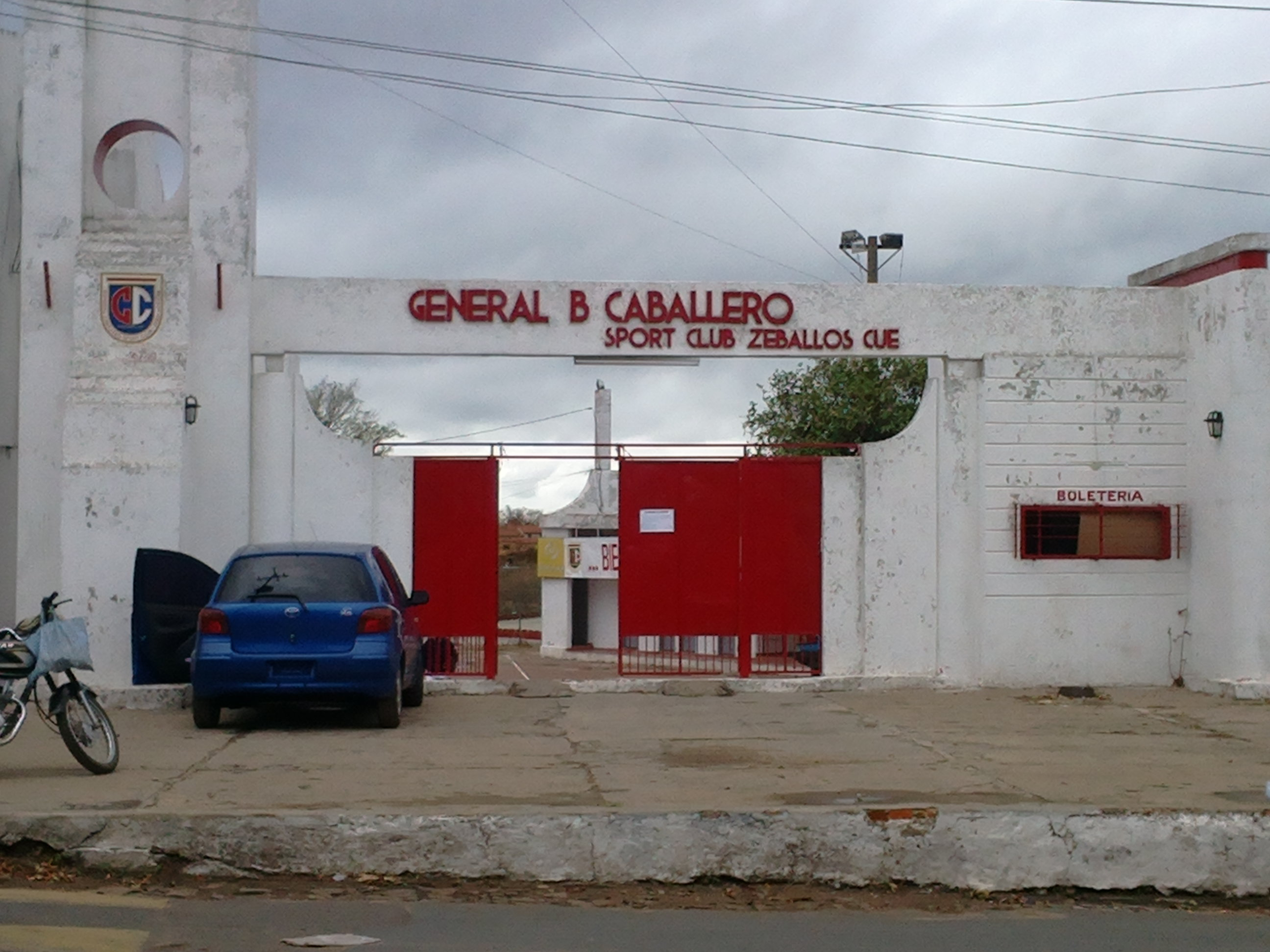
Estadio Hugo Bogado Vaceque

The home stadium of the Club General Caballero is the Estadio Hugo Bogado Vaceque, a multi-use stadium in Asunción that was opened in 1918 and holds 5,000 spectators.

== Honours ==
- Paraguayan Second Division: 6

1923, 1928, 1962, 1970, 1986, 2010

- Paraguayan Third Division: 2

1993, 2000

- Federación Paraguaya de Deportes: 1: 1937

== Current squad ==
As of January 7, 2016.

Note: Flags indicate national team as defined under FIFA eligibility rules; some limited exceptions apply. Players may hold more than one non-FIFA nationality.

No.	Pos.	Nation	Player
1	GK	PAR	Blas Hermosilla
2	DF	PAR	Hugo Centurión
3	DF	PAR	Bladimiro Duarte
4	DF	PAR	Eugenio Montiel
5	MF	PAR	Hernesto Caballero
6	DF	PAR	Oscar Noguera
7	DF	PAR	Aldo Olmedo
8	MF	PAR	Richard Franco
9	FW	PAR	Oscar Giménez
10	MF	PAR	Victor Matta
11	MF	PAR	Cristhian Aguada
12	GK	PAR	Rubén Escobar
13	MF	PAR	Adilson Ruiz
14	FW	PAR	Jorge Quintana
15	FW	PAR	Víctor Dávalos
16	MF	PAR	Jesús Araujo
17	MF	PAR	Anibal Martinez
17	FW	PAR	Jorge Colman
18	DF	PAR	Jorge Aguilar
18	FW	PAR	Osmar Leguizamón
19	FW	PAR	José Ñamandú

No.	Pos.	Nation	Player
30	MF	PAR	Matías Espinoza
—	GK	PAR	Armando Vera
—	DF	PAR	Diego Benítez
—	DF	PAR	Fredy Ayala
—	DF	PAR	Jorge Escobar
—	DF	PAR	Marcos González
—	MF	PAR	Hector Caballero
—	MF	PAR	Luis Lezcano
—	MF	PAR	Cristhian Bogado
—	MF	PAR	Jorge Samaniego
—	MF	PAR	Jonathan Salinas
—	MF	PAR	Fabio Caballero
—	MF	PAR	Joel Román
—	MF	PAR	Erme Valdez
—	FW	COL	César Caicedo
—	FW	PAR	Victor Quintana
—	FW	PAR	Diego Areco
—	FW	VEN	Rodderyk Perozo
—	FW	PAR	Éver Alfaro
—	FW	BRA	Josías Cardoso

== Notable players ==
To appear in this section a player must have either:

- Played at least 125 games for the club.
- Set a club record or won an individual award while at the club.
- Been part of a national team at any time.
- Played in the first division of any other football association (outside of Paraguay).
- Played in a continental and/or intercontinental competition.

2000's

- (Brazil) Josías Paulo Cardoso Júnior (2005–2006, 2011)
- (Paraguay) Aldo Paniagua (2007–08), (2011)

2010's

- (Paraguay) Salvador Cabañas (2013)
- (Venezuela) Rodderyk Perozo (2016–)
- (Colombia) César Caicedo (2016–)

Non-CONMEBOL players

- (Japan) Jumpei Shimmura (2010)
- (South Korea) Jim Sek Balg (1988)
