= Félix Darío León =

Paraguayan footballer and manager (born 1961)

Personal information
- Full name: Félix Darío León Núñez
- Date of birth: 2 May 1961 (age 65)
- Place of birth: Luque, Paraguay
- Height: 1.80 m (5 ft 11 in)
- Position: Forward

Senior career*
Years	Team	Apps	(Gls)
1980–1985	Guaraní		
1986	Sportivo Luqueño		
1987	Guaraní		
1988	River Plate Asunción		
1989–1990	San Lorenzo	16	(5)
1990	Deportivo Mandiyú	5	(0)
1991–1992	Cerro Porteño		
1992	Deportes Antofagasta	3	(2)
1994–1997	River Plate Asunción		

Managerial career
- 2004–2008: Guaraní (youth)
- 2008–2009: Guaraní
- 2010–2011: Guaraní
- 2012: Sportivo Luqueño
- 2012: Sportivo San Lorenzo
- 2013: Cerro Porteño PF
- 2014: 12 de Octubre
- 2014–2015: Deportivo Santaní
- 2015: 3 de Febrero
- 2015–2016: Deportivo Capiatá
- 2016: Sportivo Luqueño
- 2017: Cerro Porteño
- * Club domestic league appearances and goals

Félix Darío León Núñez (born May 2, 1961, in Luque, Paraguay) is a Paraguayan football manager and former footballer who played for clubs of Paraguay, Argentina and Chile.

== Teams ==
- (Paraguay) River Plate 1988
- (Argentina) San Lorenzo 1989-1990
- (Argentina) Mandiyú de Corrientes 1990
- (Paraguay) Cerro Porteño 1991
- (Chile) Deportes Antofagasta 1992
