= Eduardo Rivera (footballer) =

Uruguayan association football coach

Eduardo Rivera is a Uruguayan association football coach who manages Club Libertad in the Primera División Paraguaya.

== Career ==
Rivera coached for many years in Ciudad del Este and Presidente Franco, coaching Paranaense, Cerro Porteño PF and 3 de Febrero before moving to Sportivo Luqueño of the city of Luque, where he took the club to the semi-finals of the 2015 Copa Sudamericana.

On 11 December 2015, it was announced by D10 Paraguay that Rivera was the new coach of Club Libertad, over taking Ever Hugo Almeida.
