= Pablo Caballero (footballer, born 1972) =

Paraguayan footballer

Personal information
- Full name: Pablo Leonardo Caballero Cáceres
- Date of birth: 25 June 1972 (age 54)
- Place of birth: Asunción, Paraguay
- Height: 1.78 m (5 ft 10 in)
- Position: Striker

Team information
- Current team: Independiente FBC (manager)

Senior career*
Years	Team	Apps	(Gls)
1992–1995	Cerro Porteño		
1996	Colegiales		
1996	Guaraní		
1997	Everton		(19)
1997	Real Zacatecas		
1998	Palestino	6	(3)
1999	Huachipato	44	(17)
2000	Cobreloa	8	(4)
2000	UNAM	16	(4)
2001–2003	Puebla	70	(17)
2004	Sportivo Luqueño		
2004	Universidad Católica	10	(2)
2005	Alianza Atlético		
2006	3 de Febrero	7	(4)
2006–2007	Universal Encarnación		
2007	Boca Unidos		

International career
1999	Paraguay	1	(0)

Managerial career
- 2009: 3 de Febrero
- 2010–2011: Independiente FBC
- 2012: Sportivo Luqueño
- 2012–2013: Sportivo Carapeguá
- 2013: 12 de Octubre
- 2014: Rubio Ñu
- 2014: Independiente FBC
- 2014–2015: Sportivo Luqueño
- 2015: Sportivo San Lorenzo
- 2015–2016: The Strongest
- 2016: Independiente FBC
- 2016: Nacional Asunción
- 2017: Caacupé FBC
- 2017: Sport Boys Warnes
- 2017: 22 de Septiembre
- 2017–2018: Independiente FBC
- 2018: Deportivo Capiatá
- 2019: Deportivo Santaní
- 2021: Resistencia
- 2022: Fernando de la Mora
- 2022–2023: Rubio Ñu
- 2023: Deportivo Santaní
- 2023–: Independiente FBC
- * Club domestic league appearances and goals

Pablo Leonardo Caballero Cáceres (born 25 June 1972) is a Paraguayan football manager and former player who played as a striker. He is the current manager of Independiente FBC.

== Career ==
Born in Asunción, Caballero had a well-traveled playing career, appearing for clubs in Chile, Mexico and Peru. In Chile, he played for Everton in the second level and Palestino, Huachipato, Cobreloa and Universidad Católica in the top level. He played for 15 different clubs before leaving 3 de Febrero in 2006, after a dispute with manager Alicio Solalinde.

In 2003, Primera División de México side Puebla canceled his contract, ending a seven-year stint playing abroad, so Caballero returned to Paraguay to play for Cerro Porteño.

After he retired from playing, Caballero became a football coach. In December 2008, he was appointed to manage 3 de Febrero, his first coaching position with professional club.
