= Fernando Jubero =

Spanish football manager

Personal information
- Full name: Fernando Jubero Carmona
- Date of birth: 27 February 1974 (age 52)
- Place of birth: Barcelona, Spain

Team information
- Current team: Cerro Porteño (sporting manager)

Managerial career
- Years: Team
- 2013: Guaraní (caretaker)
- 2013–2015: Guaraní
- 2016: Olimpia
- 2017: Libertad
- 2018–2019: Cerro Porteño
- 2019–2020: Júbilo Iwata
- 2021–2022: Guaraní

Fernando Jubero Carmona (born 27 February 1974) is a Spanish football manager. He is the current sporting manager of Paraguayan club Cerro Porteño.

== Career ==
Born in Barcelona, Catalonia, Jubero worked as a scout for the youth categories of FC Barcelona and the Aspire Academy. Ahead of the 2012 season, he was named the new director of football of Paraguayan club Guaraní.

In June 2013, Jubero was named interim manager of Guaraní, after Diego Alonso left the club. He was in charge of the club for the remaining matches of the 2023 Apertura tournament, and later returned to his previous role as Gustavo Díaz was named manager.

On 6 August 2013, Jubero was again appointed interim, after Díaz was sacked. He was later appointed as permanent manager, but left the club on 4 December 2015.

On 21 February 2016, Jubero was appointed Olimpia manager, replacing Francisco Arce. On 20 November, he was himself dismissed, and was named at the helm of Libertad on 11 December.

On 23 December 2017, Jubero left Libertad after having to make a treatment back in his home country. The following 22 August, he took over Cerro Porteño back in Paraguay, leaving on a mutual consent on 20 May 2019.

On 3 December 2019, Jubero was named in charge of Japanese club Júbilo Iwata for the 2020 season, but was dismissed on 2 October 2020. On 12 June 2021, he returned to Guaraní after being appointed in the place of Gustavo Costas.

On 24 November 2022, Jubero left Guaraní on a mutual consent. On 19 July 2023, he returned to Cerro, but now as a sporting manager.

== Managerial statistics ==
As of 13 November 2022.

Managerial record by team and tenure
Team	Nat	From	To	Record				
Team	Nat	From	To	P	W	D	L	Win %
Guaraní	(Paraguay)	7 August 2013	31 December 2015	125	69	25	31	55.2
Olimpia	(Paraguay)	21 February 2016	21 November 2016	40	26	5	9	65.0
Libertad	(Paraguay)	11 December 2016	23 December 2017	58	28	14	16	48.3
Cerro Porteño	(Paraguay)	22 August 2018	20 May 2019	48	28	10	10	58.3
Júbilo Iwata	(Japan)	20 August 2019	1 October 2020	35	11	11	13	31.4
Guaraní	(Paraguay)	14 June 2021	24 November 2022	70	29	18	23	41.4
Total				376	191	83	102	50.8
