= Estadio Rogelio Livieres =

Multi-use stadium in Asunción, Paraguay

Coordinates: 25.3034502°S 57.6159901°W

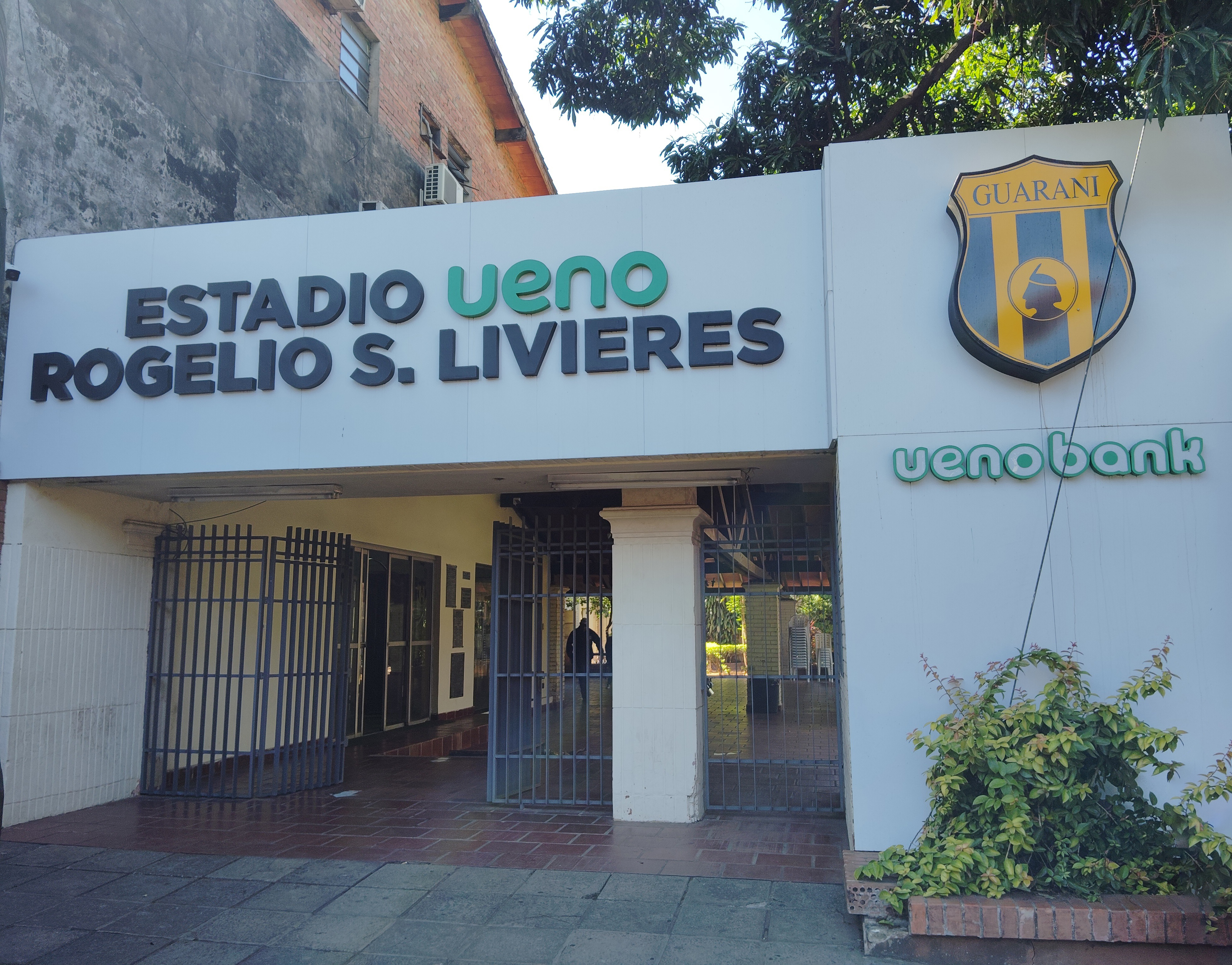
- Interactive map of Estadio Rogelio Livieres
- Full name: Estadio Rogelio Silvino Livieres
- Location: Pinozá, Asunción, Paraguay
- Capacity: 8,000
- Surface: Grass

Construction
- Opened: 1986

Tenant
- Club Guaraní

Estadio Rogelio Livieres is a multi-use stadium in Asunción, Paraguay. It is currently used mostly for football matches and is the home stadium of Club Guaraní. The stadium holds 8,000 people.
