= Club Guaraní =

Paraguayan football club in Asunción

Guarani
- Full name: Club Guarani
- Nicknames: El Cacique; El Legendario; El Aborigen
- Founded: 12 October 1903; 123 years ago
- Ground: Estadio Rogelio Livieres
- Capacity: 8,000
- Chairman: Emilio Daher
- Manager: Víctor Bernay
- League: División de Honor
- 2025: División de Honor, 2nd of 12
- Website: clubguarani.com.py
Home colours	Away colours

Club Guarani is a Paraguayan professional football club, based in the neighbourhood of Pinozá in outer Asunción.

Founded in 1903, it is one of the oldest and one of the most successful in the country, with eleven Primera División titles, and has never been relegated to a lower division.

== History ==
Club Guarani is the second oldest Paraguayan football club. It was founded on 12 October 1903 under the name of "Football Club Guarani" and its first president was Juan Patri. The name of the club derives from the Guarani people, a big part of Paraguayan culture and history. The colours of the club, black and yellow, were proposed by the Melina brothers (also among the founders of the club) in reference to the colours of Uruguayan club Peñarol, where the Melina brothers played for a few years. The mentioned colors were also used by English privateer Francis Drake in his emblem and shield, which is another reason why they were chosen to represent the club.

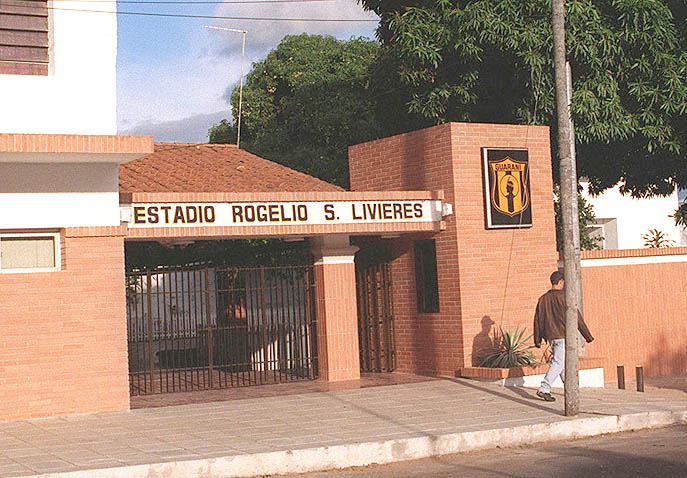
The club's stadium

Guarani is one of the traditional teams from the Paraguayan football league and during their history they have won a total of ten championships and were runners-up in fourteen occasions. The most successful era in their history was in the 1960s, where they had an excellent team that won three titles. This era is known as the "golden decade" by the Guarani fans.

Along with Olimpia, they play the "clásico añejo" (the oldest derby) because they are the two oldest teams from Paraguay. Also, Guarani, Cerro Porteño and Olimpia are the only teams that have never played in the second division of the Paraguayan league.

In late May 2010, Guarani became champions after 26 years after defeating Olimpia 2–1 to clinch the 2010 Apertura title. The club won its 11th championship in the Clausura 2016 tournmanent.

The club had a good campaign in the 2015 Copa Libertadores, qualifying to the semi-finals after beating Corinthians 3-0 on aggregate in the round of 16, and Racing Club 1-0 on aggregate. In the semi-finals, Guarani was eliminated by champions River Plate 3-1 on aggregate.

In 2018, the club won the inaugural edition of the Copa Paraguay, defeating their classic rival Olimpia on penalties after a 2-2 draw on aggregate.

The club had good seasons in 2020 and 2021, finishing runner-up to Olimpia and Cerro Porteño respectively.

== Youth ==
One of the club's youth teams played at the 2008 Torneo di Viareggio, the 2010 Torneo di Viareggio, the 2012 Torneo di Viareggio and the 2014 Torneo di Viareggio. The team is also the best-positioned Paraguayan team at the U-20 Copa Libertadores reaching the third place in the 2022 edition.

== Honours ==
=== National ===
- Primera División
  - Winners (11): 1906, 1907, 1921, 1923, 1949, 1964, 1967, 1969, 1984, 2010 Apertura, 2016 Clausura
- Copa Paraguay
  - Winners (1): 2018

== Players ==
=== First-team squad ===
As of 11 April, 2026

Note: Flags indicate national team as defined under FIFA eligibility rules; some limited exceptions apply. Players may hold more than one non-FIFA nationality.

No.	Pos.	Nation	Player
1	GK	ARG	Gaspar Servio
2	DF	ARG	Imanol Segovia
3	DF	PAR	Alcides Barbotte
4	DF	PAR	Sebastián Zaracho
5	MF	ARG	Patricio Tanda
6	MF	PAR	Bruno Díaz
7	MF	PLE	Agustín Manzur
8	MF	PAR	Matías López
9	FW	PAR	Iván Ramírez
10	FW	PAR	Derlis Rodríguez (on loan from Cerro Porteño)
11	FW	VEN	Jhon Sánchez (on loan from Emelec)
14	DF	ARG	Mariano Ramos
15	DF	PAR	Thiago Servín
17	FW	PAR	Richard Torales

No.	Pos.	Nation	Player
18	FW	PAR	César Miño
19	DF	PAR	César Ramírez
20	MF	PAR	Ricardo Quiñónez
25	MF	PAR	Giovanni Gómez
26	MF	PAR	Diego Fernández
27	MF	PAR	Marcos Gómez (on loan from Olimpia)
28	FW	PAR	Nelson Romero
29	MF	PAR	Jesús Llano
30	GK	PAR	Aldo Pérez
31	GK	PAR	Marino Arzamendia (on loan from Olimpia)
36	MF	PAR	Luis Martínez
37	DF	PAR	Daniel Pérez
38	DF	PAR	Patricio Coronel
40	FW	PAR	Fernando Fernández

=== Out on loan ===
Note: Flags indicate national team as defined under FIFA eligibility rules; some limited exceptions apply. Players may hold more than one non-FIFA nationality.

No. / Pos. / Nation / Player	No. / Pos. / Nation / Player

== Notable players ==
To appear in this section a player must have either:

- Played at least 125 games for the club.
- Set a club record or won an individual award while at the club.
- Been part of a national team at any time.
- Played in the first division of any other football association (outside of Paraguay).
- Played in a continental and/or intercontinental competition.

1980s

- (Paraguay) José Luis Chilavert (1984)

2000s

- (Paraguay) Aldo Barreto (2003–04)
- (Paraguay) Aureliano Torres (2004–06)
- (Paraguay) Federico Santander (2008–10), (2011–12), (2013–15)

2010s

- (Uruguay) Marcelo Palau (2012), (2014–)
- (Paraguay) Julio César Cáceres (2013–)
- (Paraguay) Fernando Fernández (2013–15)
- (Colombia) César Caicedo (2014)

Non-CONMEBOL players

- (Japan) Kenji Fukuda (2004)
- (Japan) Yuki Tamura (2010)

== Average attendance ==
Year	Average
2009 Clausura	1.228
2010 Apertura	2.038
2010 Clausura	1.247
2011 Apertura	1.240
2011 Clausura	1.838
2012 Apertura	2.046
2012 Clausura	1.487
2013 Apertura	1.043
2013 Clausura	1.146
2014 Apertura	1.078
2014 Clausura	794
2015 Apertura	1.184

== Managerial information ==
- (Paraguay) Atilio López
- (Uruguay) Ondino Viera (1963–64)
- (Uruguay) José María Rodríguez (1967–71)
- (Paraguay) Cayetano Ré (1985)
- (Uruguay) Julio Comesaña (1988)
- (Uruguay) José María Rodríguez (1989)
- (Argentina) Oscar Malbernat (1993)
- (Paraguay) Rolando Chilavert (1999)
- (Paraguay) Cayetano Ré (2000)
- (Uruguay) Aníbal Ruiz (2000–01)
- (Argentina) Gustavo Costas (2001–03)
- (Paraguay) Carlos Diarte (2003)
- (Argentina) Juan Amador Sánchez (2005)
- (Argentina) Alberto Jose Fanesi (Jan 1, 2006 – Jan 1, 2007)
- (Chile) Roberto Rojas (2007)
- (Paraguay) Félix Darío León (Feb 2008 – Aug 20, 2011)
- (Brazil) Beto Almeida (Aug 23, 2011 – Nov 29, 2011)
- (Brazil) James Freitas (interim) (2011)
- (Paraguay) Pablo Caballero (Dec 20, 2011 – July 9, 2012)
- (Uruguay) Diego Alonso (July 12, 2012 – June 18, 2013)
- (Spain) Fernando Jubero (interim) (2013)
- (Uruguay) Gustavo Díaz (July 3, 2013 – Aug 6, 2013)
- (Spain) Fernando Jubero (interim) (Aug 7, 2013 – Dec 10, 2015)
- (Uruguay) Fabricio Bassa (Dec 16, 2015–Feb 23, 2016)
- (Paraguay) Francisco Arce (Feb 23, 2016–Aug 3, 2016)
- (Argentina) Daniel Garnero (Aug 6, 2016–Dec 7,2017)
- (Argentina) Sebastián Saja (Dec 8, 2017–Mar 26, 2018)
- (Spain) Fernando Burgo (interim) (2018)
- (Argentina) Juan Manuel Azconzábal (2018)
- (Paraguay) Gustavo Florentín (2018–2019)
- (Argentina) Gustavo Costas (2019–2021)
- (Spain) Fernando Jubero (2021–2022)
- (Uruguay) Hernán Rodrigo López (2023)
- (Argentina) Juan Pablo Pumpido (2023)
- (Argentina) Pablo De Muner (2023)
- (Argentina) Lucas Bovaglio (2023–2024)
- (Paraguay) Francisco Arce (2024–)

=== Championship winning managers ===
Name	Season	Nationality
Salvador Melián	1906	(Spain)
Manuel Bella	1907	(Argentina)
Idelfonso López	1921	(Paraguay)
Idelfonso López	1923	(Paraguay)
Fulgencio Romaro	1949	(Paraguay)
Ondino Viera	1964	(Uruguay)
José María Rodríguez	1967	(Uruguay)
José María Rodríguez	1969	(Uruguay)
Cayetano Ré	1984	(Paraguay)
Félix Darío León	2010	(Paraguay)
Daniel Garnero	2016	(Argentina)
