= 2020 APF División de Honor =

Primera División
- Season: 2020
- Dates: 17 January – 30 December 2020
- Champions: Apertura: Cerro Porteño (33rd title); Clausura: Olimpia (45th title)
- Relegated: San Lorenzo; General Díaz
- Copa Libertadores: Cerro Porteño; Olimpia; Libertad; Guaraní
- Copa Sudamericana: Nacional; Guaireña; 12 de Octubre; River Plate
- Matches: 205
- Goals: 548 (2.67 per match)
- Top goalscorer: Apertura: Sebastián Ferreira (13 goals); Clausura: Jorge Recalde (9 goals)
- Biggest home win: Olimpia 7–0 Sportivo Luqueño (19 September)
- Biggest away win: River Plate 0–4 Olimpia (26 August)
- Highest scoring: Libertad 5–2 Guaireña (5 September); General Díaz 2–5 Sol de América (19 November); Nacional 4–3 Cerro Porteño (7 December)

The 2020 División Profesional season (officially the Copa de Primera TIGO-Visión Banco 2020 for sponsorship reasons) was the 86th season of the Paraguayan Primera División, the top-flight professional football league in Paraguay. The season began on 17 January and ended on 30 December. The fixtures for the season were announced on 16 December 2019. Olimpia were the defending champions after winning both tournaments of the 2019 season.

On 26 September, Cerro Porteño won the Torneo Apertura and clinched their thirty-third domestic championship with one match to spare following a 3–1 victory over River Plate, while the Torneo Clausura was won by Olimpia who clinched their forty-fifth domestic championship after defeating Guaraní on penalties in the final played on 30 December.

The tournament was suspended from 13 March to 21 July due to the COVID-19 pandemic.

== Teams ==
Twelve teams competed in the season: the top ten teams in the relegation table of the previous season, and two teams promoted from the División Intermedia. The new teams were 2019 División Intermedia champions Guaireña and runners-up 12 de Octubre, with the former competing in the top tier for the first time ever and the latter returning after a five-year absence. Both teams replaced Deportivo Capiatá and Deportivo Santaní, who were relegated to the second tier after seven and two years, respectively.

=== Stadia and locations ===
Locations of the 2020 Primera División teams

Team	Manager	City	Stadium (Note: Teams occasionally play their home matches at Estadio Defensores del Chaco in Asunción. Derbies between Cerro Porteño and Olimpia are also played at this stadium.)	Capacity
12 de Octubre	(Paraguay) Pedro Sarabia	Itauguá	Luis Alberto Salinas	10,000
Cerro Porteño	(Paraguay) Francisco Arce	Asunción	General Pablo Rojas	45,000
General Díaz	(Paraguay) Héctor Marecos	Luque	General Adrián Jara	3,500
General Díaz	(Paraguay) Héctor Marecos	Asunción	River Plate (Note: Used by General Díaz for their Torneo Apertura home match against Nacional since Estadio General Adrián Jara was still not suitable for VAR use.)	6,500
General Díaz	(Paraguay) Héctor Marecos	San Lorenzo	Gunther Vogel (Note: Used by General Díaz for their Torneo Apertura home match against Sportivo Luqueño since Estadio General Adrián Jara was still not suitable for VAR use.)	5,000
Guaireña	(Paraguay) Troadio Duarte	Villarrica	Parque del Guairá	12,000
Guaireña	(Paraguay) Troadio Duarte	Itauguá	Luis Alberto Salinas (Note: Used by Guaireña for their Torneo Apertura home match against River Plate since Estadio Parque del Guairá was still not suitable for VAR use.)	10,000
Guaraní	(Argentina) Gustavo Costas	Asunción	Rogelio Livieres	6,000
Libertad	(Paraguay) Juan Samudio (caretaker)	Asunción	Dr. Nicolás Leoz	10,000
Nacional	(Uruguay) Hernán Rodrigo López	Asunción	Arsenio Erico	4,000
Olimpia	(Argentina) Néstor Gorosito	Asunción	Manuel Ferreira	25,000
River Plate	(Paraguay) Ariel Galeano (caretaker)	Asunción	River Plate	6,500
San Lorenzo	(Paraguay) Roberto Torres	San Lorenzo	Gunther Vogel	5,000
Sol de América	(Paraguay) Celso Ayala	Villa Elisa	Luis Alfonso Giagni	10,000
Sportivo Luqueño	(Paraguay) Luis Escobar	Luque	Feliciano Cáceres	25,000
Sportivo Luqueño	(Paraguay) Luis Escobar	San Lorenzo	Gunther Vogel (Note: Used by Sportivo Luqueño for their Torneo Apertura home match against Guaireña since Estadio Feliciano Cáceres in Luque is closed for repairs.)	5,000
Sportivo Luqueño	(Paraguay) Luis Escobar	Itauguá	Luis Alberto Salinas (Note: Used by Sportivo Luqueño for their Torneo Apertura home match against Libertad.)	10,000
Sportivo Luqueño	(Paraguay) Luis Escobar	Asunción	River Plate (Note: Used by Sportivo Luqueño for their Torneo Apertura home match against Guaraní.)	6,500

=== Managerial changes ===
Team	Outgoing manager	Manner of departure	Date of vacancy	Position in table	Incoming manager	Date of appointment
Torneo Apertura
Guaireña	(Paraguay) Troadio Duarte	Self-demoted to assistant	7 December 2019	Pre-season	(Paraguay) Mario Jacquet	7 December 2019
Cerro Porteño	(Argentina) Víctor Bernay	End of caretaker spell	15 December 2019	Pre-season	(Paraguay) Francisco Arce	20 December 2019
Libertad	(Argentina) José Chamot	End of contract	15 December 2019	Pre-season	(Argentina) Ramón Díaz	17 December 2019
Nacional	(Paraguay) Francisco Arce	Signed by Cerro Porteño	19 December 2019	Pre-season	(Paraguay) Roberto Torres	20 December 2019
Guaireña	(Paraguay) Mario Jacquet	Resigned	12 January 2020	Pre-season	(Paraguay) Troadio Duarte	13 January 2020
Sol de América	(Bolivia) Pablo Escobar	Mutual consent	2 February 2020	9th	(Argentina) Luis Islas	2 February 2020
12 de Octubre	(Paraguay) Daniel Farrar	Sacked	21 February 2020	12th	(Argentina) Mario Jara	21 February 2020
Sportivo Luqueño	(Paraguay) Celso Ayala	Sacked	1 March 2020	10th	(Uruguay) Hernán Rodrigo López	2 March 2020
River Plate	(Argentina) Marcelo Philipp	Sacked	2 March 2020	9th	(Paraguay) Celso Ayala	2 March 2020
General Díaz	(Paraguay) Cristian Martínez	Resigned	26 June 2020	12th	(Paraguay) Robert Pereira	26 June 2020
Sol de América	(Argentina) Luis Islas	Sacked	28 July 2020	8th	(Uruguay) Sergio Órteman	28 July 2020
San Lorenzo	(Uruguay) Sergio Órteman	Mutual consent	28 July 2020	11th	(Paraguay) Cristian Martínez	28 July 2020
Sportivo Luqueño	(Uruguay) Hernán Rodrigo López	Resigned	11 September 2020	8th	(Paraguay) Carlos Humberto Paredes	12 September 2020
Nacional	(Paraguay) Roberto Torres	Sacked	16 September 2020	6th	(Uruguay) Hernán Rodrigo López	16 September 2020
San Lorenzo	(Paraguay) Cristian Martínez	Sacked	16 September 2020	12th	(Paraguay) Roberto Torres	16 September 2020
Libertad	(Argentina) Ramón Díaz	Resigned	24 September 2020	3rd	(Paraguay) Gustavo Morínigo	24 September 2020
Torneo Clausura
General Díaz	(Paraguay) Robert Pereira	Sacked	6 October 2020	Pre-tournament	(Paraguay) Julio Javier Doldán (caretaker)	6 October 2020
Olimpia	(Argentina) Daniel Garnero	Sacked	26 October 2020	9th	(Paraguay) Enrique Landaida (caretaker)	26 October 2020
River Plate	(Paraguay) Celso Ayala	Sacked	26 October 2020	12th	(Spain) Carlos Aitor García	26 October 2020
Sportivo Luqueño	(Paraguay) Carlos Humberto Paredes	Sacked	8 November 2020	8th	(Paraguay) Luis Escobar	9 November 2020
Olimpia	(Paraguay) Enrique Landaida	End of caretaker spell	11 November 2020	1st	(Argentina) Néstor Gorosito	4 November 2020 (Note: Taking office from 14 November 2020 onwards.)
General Díaz	(Paraguay) Julio Javier Doldán	End of caretaker spell	11 November 2020	12th	(Paraguay) Héctor Marecos	11 November 2020
12 de Octubre	(Argentina) Mario Jara	Sacked	12 November 2020	8th	(Paraguay) Pedro Sarabia	13 November 2020
River Plate	(Spain) Carlos Aitor García	Sacked	7 December 2020	11th	(Paraguay) Ariel Galeano (caretaker)	8 December 2020
Sol de América	(Uruguay) Sergio Órteman	Sacked	9 December 2020	7th	(Paraguay) Celso Ayala	9 December 2020
Libertad	(Paraguay) Gustavo Morínigo	Sacked	16 December 2020	5th	(Paraguay) Juan Samudio (caretaker)	16 December 2020

== Effects of the COVID-19 pandemic ==
On 10 March, and following a 15-day suspension of all public or private mass gathering events ordered by the Paraguayan government as a response to the COVID-19 pandemic, the Paraguayan Football Association announced that every match of its official competitions, including the Primera División, would be played behind closed doors during that period of time. However, on 13 March the APF announced the suspension of the tournament, following advise from its Medical Directorate.

On 28 May 2020, the APF and the presidents of the 12 Primera División clubs reached an agreement to resume the competition on 17 July, with the ninth round of the Torneo Apertura. The plan to resume competition included socialization of health protocols to the Paraguayan government and application of COVID-19 tests before the start of individual training sessions on 10 June, with collective training to resume between 16 and 22 June. On the early morning of 17 July, within hours of the planned resumption of the competition, the APF announced the postponement of the matches involving 12 de Octubre, Guaraní and San Lorenzo, due to the confirmation of COVID-19 cases in those clubs, and after consultation with its Medical Directorate as well as the presidents of the league's 12 clubs, the governing body officially announced the postponement of the return of the competition to at least 22 July.

Following new tests in those three clubs which reported negative results, the competition was eventually confirmed to resume on 21 July, with the River Plate vs. Nacional and Cerro Porteño vs. Libertad matches.

Due to the four-month suspension of the season caused by the pandemic, the format for the Torneo Clausura had to be altered. Instead of the originally scheduled double round-robin, there was a first stage in which teams played each other once for a total of 11 games, five of which at home and another away, with the remaining match (on the sixth matchday) being played on neutral ground. The top eight teams after that single round-robin stage qualified for a play-off stage, with the quarter-finals, semi-finals and final to be played as single matches, and a penalty shootout deciding the winner in case of a draw.

== Torneo Apertura ==
The Campeonato de Apertura, named "Dr. Emilio Insfrán Villalba", was the 121st official championship of the Primera División and the first championship of the 2020 season. It started on 17 January and concluded on 4 October. Prior to the COVID-19 pandemic, it was scheduled to conclude on 31 May.

=== Standings ===
Pos	Team	Pld	W	D	L	GF	GA	GD	Pts	Qualification
1	Cerro Porteño (C)	22	15	5	2	37	14	+23	50	Qualification for Copa Libertadores group stage
2	Olimpia	22	13	6	3	54	20	+34	45	
3	Libertad	22	13	5	4	43	23	+20	44	
4	Guaraní	22	11	8	3	30	16	+14	41	
5	River Plate	22	8	5	9	23	30	−7	29	
6	Guaireña	22	6	9	7	30	29	+1	27	
7	Nacional	22	6	7	9	22	22	0	25	
8	Sportivo Luqueño	22	6	7	9	22	32	−10	25	
9	12 de Octubre	22	5	6	11	23	39	−16	21	
10	Sol de América	22	4	7	11	23	40	−17	19	
11	San Lorenzo	22	2	10	10	18	36	−18	16	
12	General Díaz	22	3	5	14	22	46	−24	14	

Source: APF, Soccerway
Rules for classification: 1) Points, 2) Playoff game (only if needed to decide championship between two teams), 3) Goal difference, 4) Goals for, 5) Away goals for, 6) Drawing of lots.
(C) Champions

=== Results ===
Home \ Away	12O	CCP	GEN	GFC	GUA	LIB	NAC	OLI	RIV	SSL	SOL	SLU
12 de Octubre	—	1–4	3–3	0–2	1–3	0–3	0–2	0–3	0–1	1–0	3–1	3–2
Cerro Porteño	1–0	—	0–1	2–2	1–0	2–1	1–0	2–0	3–1	4–1	4–1	2–1
General Díaz	1–1	1–3	—	1–1	0–1	0–2	0–2	1–3	2–1	2–1	1–1	1–3
Guaireña	3–3	1–2	2–1	—	1–1	3–2	0–0	0–1	2–0	4–0	2–0	0–1
Guaraní	2–2	1–0	0–0	0–0	—	1–1	1–0	0–3 (Note: Match awarded 3–0 to Olimpia due to Guaraní fielding more foreign players than allowed. The match originally ended with Guaraní winning by a 4–2 score.)	3–0	0–0	1–1	3–0
Libertad	1–1	0–0	5–1	5–2	1–3	—	2–0	1–1	2–1	3–0	2–1	0–0
Nacional	0–0	0–0	3–0	3–0	1–2	1–2	—	1–0	1–2	2–0	2–2	1–2
Olimpia	4–0	1–1	2–1	1–1	1–2	2–1	4–0	—	1–1	4–2	4–0	7–0
River Plate	0–2	0–2	3–2	2–1	1–0	1–2	1–1	0–4	—	4–2	3–0	0–0
San Lorenzo	1–0	1–1	2–1	1–1	1–1	1–2	1–1	2–2	0–0	—	1–1	0–0
Sol de América	0–1	0–1	3–1	2–1	1–2	1–3	1–1	2–4	0–0	2–1	—	1–0
Sportivo Luqueño	2–1	0–1	4–1	1–1	0–3	1–2	1–0	2–2	0–1	0–0	2–2	—

Source: Soccerway
Legend: Blue = home team win; Yellow = draw; Red = away team win.

=== Top goalscorers ===
Rank	Name	Club	Goals
1	(Paraguay) Sebastián Ferreira	Libertad	13
2	(Paraguay) Roque Santa Cruz	Olimpia	10
3	(Paraguay) Néstor Camacho	Olimpia	9
4	(Paraguay) Óscar Cardozo	Libertad	8
4	(Paraguay) Fernando Fernández	Guaraní	8
4	(Paraguay) Pablo Zeballos	12 de Octubre	8
7	(Paraguay) Raúl Bobadilla	Guaraní	7
7	(Argentina) Diego Churín	Cerro Porteño	7
7	(Paraguay) Derlis González	Olimpia	7
7	(Paraguay) Isidro Pitta	Sportivo Luqueño / Olimpia	7
7	(Paraguay) Jorge Recalde	Olimpia	7

Source: Soccerway

== Torneo Clausura ==
The Campeonato de Clausura, named "Profesor Cristóbal Maldonado", was the 122nd official championship of the Primera División and the second championship of the 2020 season. It started on 16 October and concluded on 30 December with the final.

=== First stage ===
==== Standings ====
Pos	Team	Pld	W	D	L	GF	GA	GD	Pts	Qualification
1	12 de Octubre	11	6	2	3	15	12	+3	20	Advance to play-offs
2	Nacional	11	4	7	0	18	12	+6	19	Advance to play-offs
3	Cerro Porteño	11	5	4	2	16	11	+5	19	Advance to play-offs
4	Libertad	11	5	3	3	20	15	+5	18	Advance to play-offs
5	Guaraní	11	5	3	3	11	7	+4	18	Advance to play-offs
6	Olimpia	11	5	2	4	20	16	+4	17	Advance to play-offs
7	Sol de América	11	4	4	3	19	14	+5	16	Advance to play-offs
8	Guaireña	11	3	5	3	10	14	−4	14	Advance to play-offs
9	San Lorenzo	11	2	6	3	13	15	−2	12	
10	Sportivo Luqueño	11	3	2	6	13	19	−6	11	
11	River Plate	11	2	3	6	10	17	−7	9	
12	General Díaz	11	0	3	8	12	25	−13	3	

Source: APF, Soccerway
Rules for classification: 1) Points, 2) Playoff game (only if needed to decide championship between two teams), 3) Goal difference, 4) Goals for, 5) Away goals for, 6) Drawing of lots.

==== Results ====
Home \ Away	12O	CCP	GEN	GFC	GUA	LIB	NAC	OLI	RIV	SSL	SOL	SLU
12 de Octubre	—	2–1	2–1	3–0	1–0	—	—	—	—	0–1	—	—
Cerro Porteño	—	—	3–1	—	—	1–0	—	1–0	—	1–1	0–0	2–0
General Díaz	—	—	—	—	—	3–4	—	—	0–0	0–1	2–5	0–1
Guaireña	—	1–1	1–1	—	—	0–3	—	2–1	—	2–2	—	1–0
Guaraní	—	1–1	2–0	1–0	—	—	—	2–0	—	2–1	—	2–1
Libertad	3–0	—	—	—	1–1	—	0–2	2–1	3–1	—	0–2	—
Nacional	1–1	4–3	2–2	0–0	0–0	—	—	—	—	—	—	—
Olimpia	2–1	—	4–2	—	—	—	1–1	—	3–1	3–1	—	—
River Plate	1–2	1–2	—	1–2	1–0	—	1–1	—	—	—	—	—
San Lorenzo	—	—	—	—	—	2–2	1–1	—	0–0	—	2–2	1–2
Sol de América	0–0	—	—	1–1	1–0	—	2–3	1–3	2–3	—	—	—
Sportivo Luqueño	2–3	—	—	—	—	2–2	1–3	2–2	2–0	—	0–3	—

Source: Soccerway
Legend: Blue = home team win; Yellow = draw; Red = away team win.

=== Play-offs ===
Quarter-finals
1	12 de Octubre	1
8	Guaireña	2
4	Libertad	1
5	Guaraní	3
2	Nacional	0
7	Sol de América	1
3	Cerro Porteño	1 (1)
6	Olimpia (p)	1 (4)

Semi-finals
8	Guaireña	0
5	Guaraní	1
7	Sol de América	2
6	Olimpia	4

Final
5	Guaraní	2 (4)
6	Olimpia (p)	2 (5)

==== Quarter-finals ====
22 December 2020	Nacional	0–1	Sol de América	Asunción
18:30		Report	Valdez 82'	Stadium: Manuel Ferreira; Attendance: 0 Referee: Mario Díaz de Vivar

22 December 2020	Cerro Porteño	1–1 (1–4 p)	Olimpia	Asunción
21:00	Giménez 15'	Report	Recalde 10'	Stadium: Defensores del Chaco; Attendance: 0 Referee: Éber Aquino
	Penalties
	Valdez (penalty missed); Villasanti (penalty scored); Giménez (penalty missed)		(penalty scored) Silva; (penalty scored) Camacho; (penalty scored) Polenta; (penalty scored) I. Torres

23 December 2020	12 de Octubre	1–2	Guaireña	Villa Elisa
18:30	Garcete 74'	Report	González 8', 24'	Stadium: Luis Alfonso Giagni; Attendance: 0 Referee: José Méndez

23 December 2020	Libertad	1–3	Guaraní	Luque
21:00	Cardozo 13'	Report	F. Fernández 49'; Domínguez 80'; Bobadilla 86'	Stadium: Feliciano Cáceres; Attendance: 0 Referee: Juan Gabriel Benítez

==== Semi-finals ====
27 December 2020	Sol de América	2–4	Olimpia	Asunción
18:30	Cazal 83'; Portillo 89'	Report	I. Torres 54'; Recalde 55'; Ortiz 67'; D. Torres 82'	Stadium: Defensores del Chaco; Attendance: 0 Referee: Carlos Benítez

27 December 2020	Guaireña	0–1	Guaraní	Asunción
21:00		Report	Florentín 72'	Stadium: General Pablo Rojas; Attendance: 0 Referee: Mario Díaz de Vivar

==== Final ====
30 December 2020
19:30 UTC−3

Guaraní	2–2	Olimpia
Maná 36'; Báez 39'	Report	Recalde 57'; Silva 69' (pen.)
Penalties
Báez (penalty scored); Benítez (penalty missed); Morel (penalty scored); Florentín (penalty scored); Merlini (penalty scored); Bobadilla (penalty missed)	4–5	(penalty scored) Silva; (penalty scored) Polenta; (penalty scored) I. Torres; (penalty missed) Domingo; (penalty scored) Ortiz; (penalty scored) Ojeda

Estadio Defensores del Chaco, Asunción
Attendance: 0
Referee: Juan Gabriel Benítez

=== Top goalscorers ===
Rank	Name	Club	Goals
1	(Paraguay) Jorge Recalde	Olimpia	9
2	(Paraguay) Roque Santa Cruz	Olimpia	7
3	(Paraguay) Pablo Velázquez	General Díaz	6
4	(Paraguay) Óscar Cardozo	Libertad	5
4	(Paraguay) Pablo Zeballos	12 de Octubre	5
6	(Paraguay) Cecilio Domínguez	Guaraní	4
6	(Paraguay) Sebastián Ferreira	Libertad	4
6	(Paraguay) Jorge Ortega	Sportivo Luqueño	4
6	(Paraguay) Nildo Viera	Sol de América	4

Source: Soccerway

== Aggregate table ==
Pos	Team	Pld	W	D	L	GF	GA	GD	Pts	Qualification
1	Cerro Porteño (C)	33	20	9	4	53	25	+28	69	Qualification for Copa Libertadores group stage
2	Olimpia (C)	33	18	8	7	74	36	+38	62	Qualification for Copa Libertadores group stage
3	Libertad	33	18	8	7	63	38	+25	62	Qualification for Copa Libertadores second stage
4	Guaraní	33	16	11	6	41	23	+18	59	Qualification for Copa Libertadores first stage
5	Nacional	33	10	14	9	40	34	+6	44	Qualification for Copa Sudamericana first stage (Note: Since the 2020 Copa Paraguay was postponed to 2021 due to the COVID-19 pandemic in Paraguay, the spot awarded to its champions (Copa Sudamericana first stage) was passed over to the aggregate table fourth best-placed team not qualified for the Copa Libertadores.)
6	Guaireña	33	9	14	10	40	43	−3	41	Qualification for Copa Sudamericana first stage
7	12 de Octubre	33	11	8	14	38	51	−13	41	Qualification for Copa Sudamericana first stage
8	River Plate	33	10	8	15	33	47	−14	38	Qualification for Copa Sudamericana first stage
9	Sportivo Luqueño	33	9	9	15	35	51	−16	36	
10	Sol de América	33	8	11	14	42	54	−12	35	
11	San Lorenzo	33	4	16	13	31	51	−20	28	
12	General Díaz	33	3	8	22	34	71	−37	17	

Source: APF
Rules for classification: 1) Points, 2) Playoff game (only if needed to decide international qualification between two teams), 3) Goal difference, 4) Goals for, 5) Away goals for, 6) Drawing of lots.
(C) Champions

== Relegation ==
Relegation is determined at the end of the season by computing an average of the number of points earned per game over the past three seasons. The two teams with the lowest average will be relegated to the División Intermedia for the following season.

Pos	Team	2018 Pts	2019 Pts	2020 Pts	Total Pts	Total Pld	Avg	Relegation
1	Olimpia	102	108	62	272	121	2.248	
2	Cerro Porteño	82	80	69	231	121	1.909	
3	Libertad	76	85	62	223	121	1.843	
4	Guaraní	48	69	59	176	121	1.455	
5	Nacional	65	52	44	161	121	1.331	
6	Sol de América	63	57	35	155	121	1.281	
7	Guaireña	—	—	41	41	33	1.242	
8	12 de Octubre	—	—	41	41	33	1.242	
9	River Plate	—	52	38	90	77	1.169	
10	Sportivo Luqueño	46	52	36	134	121	1.107	
11	San Lorenzo (R)	—	49	28	77	77	1	Relegation to División Intermedia
12	General Díaz (R)	46	41	16	103	121	0.851	Relegation to División Intermedia

Updated to matches played on 19 December 2020. Source: APF
