= 2023 APF División de Honor =

Paraguayan Primera División season

Primera División
- Season: 2023
- Dates: 27 January – 1 December 2023
- Champions: Apertura: Libertad (23rd title); Clausura: Libertad (24th title)
- Relegated: Guaireña; Resistencia
- Copa Libertadores: Libertad; Cerro Porteño; Sportivo Trinidense; Nacional (via Copa Paraguay)
- Copa Sudamericana: Guaraní; Olimpia; Sportivo Ameliano; Sportivo Luqueño
- Matches: 264
- Goals: 664 (2.52 per match)
- Top goalscorer: Apertura: Óscar Cardozo (10 goals); Clausura: Óscar Cardozo (11 goals)
- Biggest home win: Libertad 5–0 Cerro Porteño (2 April); Nacional 5–0 Resistencia (6 November); Spvo. Trinidense 7–2 Guaireña (29 November)
- Biggest away win: Resistencia 0–4 Guaraní (17 February); Guaireña 1–5 Libertad (7 October)
- Highest scoring: Spvo. Trinidense 7–2 Guaireña (29 November)

The 2023 Primera División season (officially the Copa de Primera Tigo – Ueno 2023 for sponsorship reasons) was the 89th season of the Paraguayan Primera División, the top-flight professional football league in Paraguay. The season consisted of two tournaments, Apertura and Clausura, and it began on 27 January and ended on 1 December 2023. The fixtures for the season were announced on 14 November 2022.

In the Torneo Apertura, Libertad were the champions, clinching their twenty-third title with three matches in hand following a 1–0 win over Olimpia and a 2–1 defeat for Cerro Porteño against General Caballero (JLM) on 20 May. Libertad also won the Torneo Clausura, securing their twenty-fourth league championship with two games in hand and a 1–0 victory over Sportivo Luqueño on 12 November. Olimpia started the season as defending champions, having won the 2022 Clausura tournament.

== Teams ==
Twelve teams competed in this season: the top ten teams in the relegation table of the 2022 season, and the top two teams in the 2022 Paraguayan División Intermedia (Sportivo Trinidense and Sportivo Luqueño). The promoted teams replaced Sol de América and 12 de Octubre, who were relegated to the second tier at the end of the previous season.

Pos.	Relegated from 2022 Primera División
11th	Sol de América
12th	12 de Octubre

Pos.	Promoted from 2022 División Intermedia
1st	Sportivo Trinidense
2nd	Sportivo Luqueño

=== Stadia and locations ===
Locations of the 2023 Primera División teams
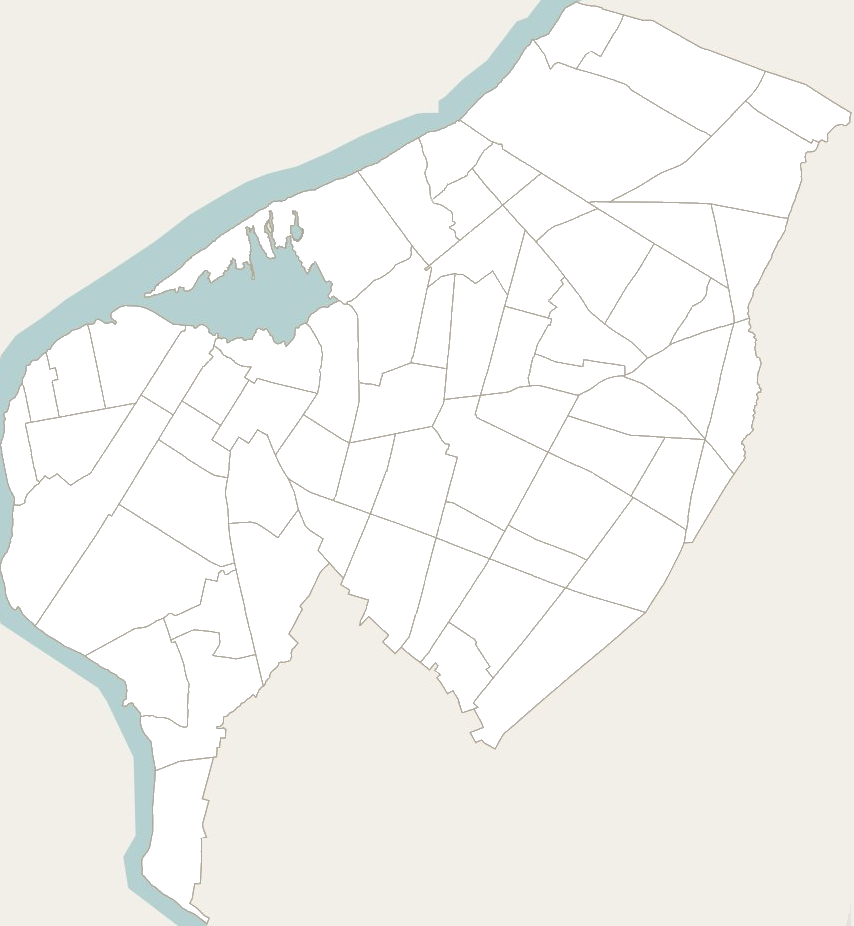
Locations of the 2023 Primera División teams – Asunción

Team	City	Stadium (Note: Teams occasionally play their home matches at Estadio Defensores del Chaco in Asunción. Derbies between Cerro Porteño and Olimpia are also usually played at this stadium.)	Capacity
Cerro Porteño	Asunción	General Pablo Rojas	45,000
General Caballero (JLM)	Juan León Mallorquín	Ka'arendy	10,000
Guaireña	Villarrica	Parque del Guairá	12,000
Guaraní	Asunción	Rogelio Livieres	6,000
Libertad	Asunción	Tigo La Huerta	10,000
Nacional	Asunción	Arsenio Erico	4,000
Olimpia	Asunción	Tigo Manuel Ferreira	25,000
Resistencia	Asunción	Luis Alfonso Giagni (Note: Used as home stadium for the season since Resistencia's stadium Estadio Tomás Beggan Correa did not meet APF requirements.)	11,000
Sportivo Ameliano	Asunción	Martín Torres (Note: Used as home stadium for the season since Sportivo Ameliano's stadium Estadio José Tomás Silva did not meet APF requirements.)	3,000
Sportivo Luqueño	Luque	Feliciano Cáceres	23,000
Sportivo Trinidense	Asunción	Martín Torres	3,000
Tacuary	Asunción	Luis Alfonso Giagni (Note: Used as home stadium for the season since Tacuary's stadium Estadio Toribio Vargas did not meet APF requirements.)	11,000

=== Personnel and kits ===
Team	Manager	Kit manufacturer	Shirt sponsor
Cerro Porteño	(Argentina) Víctor Bernay (caretaker)	Puma	Tigo, Visión Banco
General Caballero (JLM)	(Argentina) Fabián Ponce (caretaker)	Kappa	Sanatorio San Sebastián
Guaireña	(Paraguay) Humberto Ovelar	Kyrios	Coopeduc, CLS Remates
Guaraní	(Argentina) Pablo de Muner	Kyrios	Tigo
Libertad	(Paraguay) Ariel Galeano	Puma	Tigo
Nacional	(Argentina) Juan Pablo Pumpido	Kappa	Banco Continental, Coca-Cola
Olimpia	(Paraguay) Francisco Arce	Nike	Tigo, Visión Banco
Resistencia	(Paraguay) Carlos Recalde	Lotto	Pulp, CPS
Sportivo Ameliano	(Paraguay) Humberto García	Garcis	Ayres, FerreShop, Slots del Sol
Sportivo Luqueño	(Paraguay) Julio César Cáceres	Kyrios	Comercial Vírgen del Rosario, Banco Río
Sportivo Trinidense	(Paraguay) José Arrúa	Saltarín Rojo	Noroda, Lácteos Trébol, Chorti Beef
Tacuary	(Brazil) Vinícius Eutrópio	Saltarín Rojo	Argor, Fleming

=== Managerial changes ===
Team	Outgoing manager	Manner of departure	Date of vacancy	Position in table	Incoming manager	Date of appointment
Torneo Apertura
Sportivo Luqueño	(Argentina) Miguel Ángel Zahzú	Resigned	23 October 2022	Pre-season	(Paraguay) Gustavo Florentín	27 October 2022
Resistencia	(Argentina) Mario Jara	Sacked	17 November 2022	Pre-season	(Argentina) Miguel Ángel Zahzú	24 November 2022
Sportivo Ameliano	(Argentina) Juan Pablo Pumpido	Resigned	20 November 2022	Pre-season	(Paraguay) Humberto García	22 November 2022
Guaraní	(Spain) Fernando Jubero	Mutual agreement	24 November 2022	Pre-season	(Uruguay) Hernán Rodrigo López	24 November 2022
Guaireña	(Paraguay) Troadio Duarte	End of contract	28 November 2022	Pre-season	(Paraguay) Roberto Torres	30 November 2022
Tacuary	(Paraguay) Robert Pereira	Sacked	3 February 2023	12th	(Paraguay) Carlos Humberto Paredes	6 February 2023
Cerro Porteño	(Paraguay) Francisco Arce	Sacked	6 February 2023	3rd	(Paraguay) Diego Gavilán (Note: Caretaker manager.)	6 February 2023
Cerro Porteño	(Paraguay) Diego Gavilán	End of caretaker spell	11 February 2023	3rd	(Argentina) Facundo Sava	12 February 2023
General Caballero (JLM)	(Paraguay) Humberto Ovelar	Sacked	26 February 2023	7th	(Paraguay) Troadio Duarte	27 February 2023
Olimpia	(Paraguay) Julio César Cáceres	Sacked	6 March 2023	5th	(Spain) Carlos Aitor García	6 March 2023
Resistencia	(Argentina) Miguel Ángel Zahzú	Resigned	6 March 2023	11th	(Uruguay) Sergio Órteman	6 March 2023
Olimpia	(Spain) Carlos Aitor García	End of caretaker spell	12 March 2023	2nd	(Uruguay) Diego Aguirre	11 March 2023
Tacuary	(Paraguay) Carlos Humberto Paredes	Sacked	27 March 2023	12th	(Paraguay) Badayco Maciel	28 March 2023
Guaireña	(Paraguay) Roberto Torres	Mutual agreement	2 April 2023	10th	(Argentina) Luciano Theiler	4 April 2023
Tacuary	(Paraguay) Badayco Maciel	End of caretaker spell	12 April 2023	12th	(Paraguay) Iván Almeida	13 April 2023
Resistencia	(Uruguay) Sergio Órteman	Sacked	9 May 2023	10th	(Paraguay) Carlos Recalde	9 May 2023
Sportivo Luqueño	(Paraguay) Gustavo Florentín	Resigned	30 May 2023	8th	(Paraguay) Julio César Cáceres	31 May 2023
Guaraní	(Uruguay) Hernán Rodrigo López	Sacked	10 June 2023	4th	(Argentina) Juan Pablo Pumpido	9 June 2023
Torneo Clausura
Cerro Porteño	(Argentina) Facundo Sava	Sacked	9 July 2023	11th	(Argentina) Víctor Bernay	9 July 2023
Cerro Porteño	(Argentina) Víctor Bernay	End of caretaker spell	19 July 2023	7th	(Paraguay) Diego Gavilán	19 July 2023
Olimpia	(Uruguay) Diego Aguirre	Sacked	20 July 2023	11th	(Paraguay) Francisco Arce	21 July 2023
Guaireña	(Argentina) Luciano Theiler	Sacked	8 August 2023	9th	(Paraguay) Humberto Ovelar	8 August 2023
Guaraní	(Argentina) Juan Pablo Pumpido	Sacked	13 August 2023	9th	(Paraguay) Buenaventura Ferreira	13 August 2023
Nacional	(Paraguay) Pedro Sarabia	Sacked	23 August 2023	8th	(Argentina) Juan Pablo Pumpido	26 August 2023
Guaraní	(Paraguay) Buenaventura Ferreira	End of caretaker spell	27 August 2023	6th	(Argentina) Pablo de Muner	23 August 2023
Tacuary	(Paraguay) Iván Almeida	Sacked	17 September 2023	7th	(Paraguay) Aldo Bobadilla	18 September 2023
Cerro Porteño	(Paraguay) Diego Gavilán	Sacked	18 September 2023	2nd	(Argentina) Víctor Bernay (Note: Caretaker manager until the end of the season.)	18 September 2023
Libertad	(Argentina) Daniel Garnero	Signed by Paraguay	20 September 2023	1st	(Paraguay) Ariel Galeano	22 September 2023
Tacuary	(Paraguay) Aldo Bobadilla	Resigned	18 October 2023	12th	(Brazil) Vinícius Eutrópio	20 October 2023
General Caballero (JLM)	(Paraguay) Troadio Duarte	Sacked	12 November 2023	9th	(Argentina) Fabián Ponce	13 November 2023

== Torneo Apertura ==
The Torneo Apertura, named "Homenaje al Dr. Marcelo Pecci", was the 127th official championship of the Primera División and the first championship of the 2022 season. It started on 27 January and ended on 11 June.

=== Standings ===
Pos	Team	Pld	W	D	L	GF	GA	GD	Pts	Qualification
1	Libertad (C)	22	16	3	3	39	15	+24	51	Qualification for Copa Libertadores group stage
2	Cerro Porteño	22	11	8	3	40	29	+11	41	
3	Sportivo Trinidense	22	11	5	6	34	21	+13	38	
4	Guaraní	22	8	9	5	29	24	+5	33	
5	Nacional	22	9	6	7	23	21	+2	33	
6	Olimpia	22	8	7	7	32	26	+6	31	
7	Sportivo Ameliano	22	7	9	6	27	28	−1	30	
8	Sportivo Luqueño	22	6	9	7	27	28	−1	27	
9	General Caballero (JLM)	22	6	6	10	21	28	−7	24	
10	Guaireña	22	3	8	11	15	31	−16	17	
11	Resistencia	22	4	5	13	14	35	−21	17	
12	Tacuary	22	4	3	15	16	31	−15	15	

Source: APF, Soccerway
Rules for classification: 1) Points, 2) Head-to-head points, 3) Head-to-head goal difference, 4) Overall goal difference, 5) Goals for, 6) Playoff game (if needed to decide championship between two teams) or Drawing of lots (if three teams or more are tied).
(C) Champions

=== Results ===
Home \ Away	CCP	GCM	GFC	GUA	LIB	NAC	OLI	RES	SPA	SLU	TRI	TAC
Cerro Porteño	—	1–2	2–0	1–1	2–0	4–1	2–2	1–1	1–1	3–3	3–2	1–0
General Caballero (JLM)	2–3	—	3–0	0–0	0–2	0–1	1–2	2–0	0–1	3–2	1–4	1–0
Guaireña	0–2	0–0	—	2–2	0–2	1–3	1–0	1–3	0–1	0–2	1–1	0–1
Guaraní	0–3	3–1	1–1	—	0–0	2–2	1–2	1–0	2–2	3–1	0–2	1–0
Libertad	5–0	1–0	2–0	1–0	—	2–1	1–0	4–0	1–1	1–1	2–1	1–0
Nacional	2–1	2–0	2–2	0–2	1–2	—	1–1	0–0	1–0	0–1	0–1	2–0
Olimpia	2–2	1–1	1–1	0–1	2–1	0–1	—	4–1	1–3	2–1	1–1	4–0
Resistencia	1–2	1–1	0–2	0–4	0–2	0–1	0–3	—	1–1	1–1	1–0	1–0
Sportivo Ameliano	1–2	0–1	1–1	1–1	2–5	0–0	2–2	0–3	—	2–0	2–1	2–1
Sportivo Luqueño	1–1	1–1	0–0	3–0	0–2	0–1	1–0	1–0	1–1	—	2–2	2–0
Sportivo Trinidense	0–1	2–0	1–0	1–1	1–2	2–1	3–1	2–0	2–0	2–2	—	2–0
Tacuary	2–2	1–1	1–2	1–3	3–0	0–0	0–1	2–0	1–3	3–1	0–1	—

Source: APF, Soccerway
Legend: Blue = home team win; Yellow = draw; Red = away team win.

=== Top scorers ===
Rank	Name	Club	Goals
1	(Paraguay) Óscar Cardozo	Libertad	10
2	(Paraguay) Marcelo Pérez	Sportivo Luqueño	8
3	(Paraguay) Pedro Delvalle	Sportivo Trinidense	7
4	(Argentina) Claudio Aquino	Cerro Porteño	6
4	(Paraguay) Néstor Camacho	Guaraní	6
4	(Paraguay) Lorenzo Melgarejo	Libertad	6
4	(Paraguay) Cristhian Ocampos	Nacional	6
4	(Paraguay) Elías Sarquis	Sportivo Ameliano	6
4	(Paraguay) Iván Valdez	Tacuary	6
4	(Paraguay) Héctor Villalba	Libertad	6

Source: Soccerway

== Torneo Clausura ==
The Torneo Clausura, named "Centenario del Club Tacuary", was the 128th official championship of the Primera División and the second and last championship of the 2022 season. It began on 7 July and ended on 1 December.

=== Standings ===
Pos	Team	Pld	W	D	L	GF	GA	GD	Pts	Qualification
1	Libertad (C)	22	14	6	2	45	14	+31	48	Qualification for Copa Libertadores group stage
2	Cerro Porteño	22	10	10	2	41	21	+20	40	
3	Nacional	22	8	8	6	33	23	+10	32	
4	Guaraní	22	9	5	8	20	29	−9	32	
5	Olimpia	22	8	7	7	28	26	+2	31	
6	Tacuary	22	7	8	7	24	29	−5	29	
7	Sportivo Trinidense	22	7	6	9	34	35	−1	27	
8	Sportivo Ameliano	22	8	3	11	32	34	−2	27	
9	General Caballero (JLM)	22	6	7	9	18	24	−6	25	
10	Sportivo Luqueño	22	6	6	10	24	28	−4	24	
11	Guaireña	22	6	6	10	29	41	−12	24	
12	Resistencia	22	5	4	13	20	44	−24	19	

Source: APF, Soccerway
Rules for classification: 1) Points, 2) Head-to-head points, 3) Head-to-head goal difference, 4) Overall goal difference, 5) Goals for, 6) Playoff game (if needed to decide championship between two teams) or Drawing of lots (if three teams or more are tied).
(C) Champions

=== Results ===
Home \ Away	CCP	GCM	GFC	GUA	LIB	NAC	OLI	RES	SPA	SLU	TRI	TAC
Cerro Porteño	—	2–0	1–3	4–0	1–1	1–1	1–1	4–1	3–2	2–0	4–1	1–1
General Caballero (JLM)	1–1	—	0–0	0–1	0–0	0–0	0–1	2–0	1–4	1–0	2–0	0–0
Guaireña	1–4	2–1	—	2–1	1–5	0–0	0–1	4–1	2–2	2–2	2–0	1–2
Guaraní	1–0	2–0	0–0	—	0–3	1–1	0–1	3–2	0–3	2–1	0–2	2–0
Libertad	1–1	0–0	4–3	0–0	—	2–0	4–0	4–1	3–0	2–0	0–1	1–2
Nacional	1–1	2–3	2–0	4–0	2–3	—	1–0	5–0	2–1	2–1	1–2	1–1
Olimpia	0–0	3–1	1–1	5–3	1–3	1–2	—	0–0	4–0	2–1	2–2	1–2
Resistencia	0–1	1–1	1–0	0–1	0–1	2–1	3–2	—	0–3	0–0	1–4	1–3
Sportivo Ameliano	0–1	1–2	4–0	0–0	0–2	2–0	1–0	1–2	—	0–2	0–3	2–1
Sportivo Luqueño	2–2	1–0	1–0	1–2	0–1	1–1	0–1	2–2	1–2	—	2–1	3–1
Sportivo Trinidense	2–5	0–3	7–2	0–0	1–1	1–1	1–1	1–2	3–2	1–2	—	1–1
Tacuary	1–1	3–0	1–3	0–1	0–4	0–3	0–0	1–0	2–2	1–1	1–0	—

Source: APF, Soccerway
Legend: Blue = home team win; Yellow = draw; Red = away team win.

=== Top scorers ===
Rank	Name	Club	Goals
1	(Paraguay) Óscar Cardozo	Libertad	11
2	(Paraguay) Gustavo Aguilar	Nacional	9
3	(Paraguay) Elvio Vera	Sportivo Ameliano	8
4	(Paraguay) Oscar Giménez	Sportivo Trinidense	7
4	(Paraguay) Héctor Villalba	Libertad	7
6	(Paraguay) Cecilio Domínguez	Cerro Porteño	6
6	(Paraguay) Alfio Oviedo	Cerro Porteño	6
6	(Paraguay) Kevin Parzajuk	Guaireña	6
6	(Paraguay) José Verdún	Guaireña	6

Source: Soccerway

== Aggregate table ==
Pos	Team	Pld	W	D	L	GF	GA	GD	Pts	Qualification
1	Libertad (C)	44	30	9	5	84	29	+55	99	Qualification for Copa Libertadores group stage
2	Cerro Porteño	44	21	18	5	81	50	+31	81	Qualification for Copa Libertadores group stage
3	Sportivo Trinidense	44	18	11	15	68	56	+12	65	Qualification for Copa Libertadores second stage
4	Nacional	44	17	14	13	56	44	+12	65	Qualification for Copa Libertadores first stage (Note: Nacional qualified for the Copa Libertadores first stage as the 2023 Copa Paraguay third-placed team.)
5	Guaraní	44	17	14	13	49	53	−4	65	Qualification for Copa Sudamericana first stage
6	Olimpia	44	16	14	14	60	52	+8	62	Qualification for Copa Sudamericana first stage
7	Sportivo Ameliano	44	15	12	17	59	62	−3	57	Qualification for Copa Sudamericana first stage
8	Sportivo Luqueño	44	12	15	17	51	56	−5	51	Qualification for Copa Sudamericana first stage
9	General Caballero (JLM)	44	12	13	19	39	52	−13	49	
10	Tacuary	44	11	11	22	40	60	−20	44	
11	Guaireña	44	9	14	21	44	72	−28	41	
12	Resistencia	44	9	9	26	34	79	−45	36	

Source: APF
Rules for classification: 1) Points, 2) Head-to-head points, 3) Head-to-head goal difference, 4) Overall goal difference, 5) Goals for, 6) Playoff game (if needed to decide international qualification between two teams) or Drawing of lots (if three teams or more are tied).
(C) Champions

== Relegation ==
Relegation is determined at the end of the season by computing an average of the number of points earned per game over the past three seasons. The two teams with the lowest average were relegated to the División Intermedia for the following season.

Pos	Team	2021 Pts	2022 Pts	2023 Pts	Total Pts	Total Pld	Avg	Relegation
1	Libertad	65	91	99	255	124	2.056	
2	Cerro Porteño	66	98	81	245	124	1.976	
3	Olimpia	51	92	62	205	124	1.653	
4	Nacional	50	71	65	186	124	1.5	
5	Sportivo Trinidense	—	—	65	65	44	1.477	
6	Guaraní	61	55	65	181	124	1.46	
7	Sportivo Ameliano	—	48	57	105	88	1.193	
8	Sportivo Luqueño	—	—	51	51	44	1.159	
9	General Caballero (JLM)	—	51	49	100	88	1.136	
10	Tacuary	—	53	44	97	88	1.102	
11	Guaireña (R)	44	50	41	135	124	1.089	Relegation to División Intermedia
12	Resistencia (R)	—	49	36	85	88	0.966	Relegation to División Intermedia

Source: APF

== Season awards ==
On 4 December 2023, a ceremony was held at the headquarters of the Paraguayan Football Association in Luque to announce the winners of the season awards (Premios de Primera), who were chosen based on voting by the managers of the Primera División teams, local sports journalists, the APF's Referee Commission, the public, as well as the tournament's official broadcaster Tigo Sports and official statistics.

Award	Winner	Club
Best Player	(Paraguay) Óscar Cardozo	Libertad
Revelation Player	(Paraguay) Romeo Benítez	Guaraní
People's Player	(Paraguay) Damián Bobadilla	Cerro Porteño
Best Goal	(Paraguay) Jorge Ortega (against Nacional, Torneo Clausura Round 2)	Tacuary
Best Goalkeeper	(Uruguay) Martín Silva	Libertad
Best Manager	(Paraguay) Daniel Garnero	Libertad
Best Referee	Juan Gabriel Benítez	
Best Assistant Referee	Eduardo Cardozo	
Best VAR Referee	Carlos Paul Benítez	
Top Scorer	(Paraguay) Óscar Cardozo (21 goals)	Libertad
Fair Play Team	Libertad	
Most Minutes played by U-18s	Libertad (1560 minutes)	

== See also ==
- 2023 Copa Paraguay
- 2023 Paraguayan División Intermedia
