= 2019 APF División de Honor =

Primera División
- Season: 2019
- Dates: 22 January – 15 December 2019
- Champions: Apertura: Olimpia (43rd title); Clausura: Olimpia (44th title)
- Relegated: Deportivo Capiatá; Deportivo Santaní
- Copa Libertadores: Olimpia; Libertad; Cerro Porteño; Guaraní
- Copa Sudamericana: Sol de América; Nacional; River Plate; Sportivo Luqueño
- Matches: 264
- Goals: 724 (2.74 per match)
- Top goalscorer: Apertura: William Mendieta and Roque Santa Cruz (11 goals each); Clausura: Roque Santa Cruz (15 goals)
- Biggest home win: Cerro Porteño 7–2 Sol de América (18 March); Guaraní 5–0 General Díaz (1 September); Cerro Porteño 5–0 Nacional (10 November)
- Biggest away win: Deportivo Santaní 0–6 Olimpia (4 May); Deportivo Capiatá 0–6 Olimpia (30 August)
- Highest scoring: Cerro Porteño 7–2 Sol de América (18 March)

The 2019 División Profesional season (officially the Copa de Primera TIGO-Visión Banco 2019 for sponsorship reasons) was the 85th season of top-flight professional football in Paraguay. The season began on 22 January and ended on 15 December. The fixtures for the season were announced on 13 December 2018. Olimpia were the defending champions after winning both tournaments of the 2018 season, and won a third championship in a row in the Torneo Apertura with three matches to spare after defeating Deportivo Santaní by a 6–0 score on 4 May. Olimpia also crowned themselves in the Torneo Clausura, winning a fourth title in a row with one matchday remaining, following a 2–2 draw at home against Guaraní on 8 December.

== Teams ==
Twelve teams competed in the season: the top ten teams in the relegation table of the previous season, and two teams promoted from the División Intermedia. The new teams were 2018 División Intermedia champions River Plate and runners-up San Lorenzo, who returned to the top flight after two and three years, respectively. Both replaced Independiente (CG) and 3 de Febrero, who were relegated to the second tier after two and one year, respectively.

=== Stadia and locations ===
Locations of the 2019 Primera División teams

Team	Manager	Home city	Stadium	Capacity
Cerro Porteño	(Argentina) Víctor Bernay (caretaker)	Asunción	General Pablo Rojas	45,000
Deportivo Capiatá	(Paraguay) Carlos Recalde	Capiatá	Erico Galeano	10,000
Deportivo Santaní	(Paraguay) Robert Gauto (caretaker)	San Estanislao	Juan José Vázquez	8,000
General Díaz	(Paraguay) Cristian Martínez	Luque	General Adrián Jara	3,500
Guaraní	(Argentina) Gustavo Costas	Asunción	Rogelio Livieres	6,000
Libertad	(Argentina) José Chamot	Asunción	Dr. Nicolás Leoz	10,000
Nacional	(Paraguay) Francisco Arce	Asunción	Arsenio Erico	4,000
Olimpia	(Argentina) Daniel Garnero	Asunción	Manuel Ferreira	25,000
River Plate	(Argentina) Marcelo Philipp	Asunción	River Plate	6,500
San Lorenzo	(Uruguay) Sergio Órteman	San Lorenzo	Gunther Vogel	5,000
Sol de América	(Bolivia) Pablo Escobar	Villa Elisa	Luis Alfonso Giagni	10,000
Sportivo Luqueño	(Paraguay) Celso Ayala	Luque	La Arboleda^{a}	8,000

Note: Teams occasionally play their home games at Estadio Defensores del Chaco in Asunción. Derbies between Cerro Porteño and Olimpia are also played at this stadium.
a: Sportivo Luqueño will play their home games at Estadio La Arboleda in Asunción as their regular stadium Estadio Feliciano Cáceres is closed for repair works. They played their Torneo Apertura home game against San Lorenzo at Estadio Erico Galeano in Capiatá.

=== Managerial changes ===
Team	Outgoing manager	Manner of departure	Date of vacancy	Position in table	Incoming manager	Date of appointment
Torneo Apertura
Deportivo Capiatá	(Paraguay) Julio Cabrera	End of caretaker spell	8 December 2018	Pre-season	(Argentina) José Basualdo	19 December 2018
Nacional	(Argentina) Fernando Gamboa	Sacked	31 January 2019	12th	(Paraguay) Hugo Caballero (caretaker)	31 January 2019
General Díaz	(Paraguay) Florencio Villalba	Resigned	10 February 2019	10th	(Paraguay) Luis Escobar (caretaker)	11 February 2019
Sportivo Luqueño	(Paraguay) Pedro Sarabia	Resigned	15 February 2019	10th	(Paraguay) Roberto Torres	11 February 2019
Deportivo Santaní	(Paraguay) Héctor Marecos	Sacked	17 February 2019	12th	(Paraguay) Carlos Jara	17 February 2019
Sol de América	(Paraguay) Ever Hugo Almeida	Resigned	22 February 2019	5th	(Paraguay) Alfredo Vera (caretaker)	23 February 2019
Deportivo Capiatá	(Argentina) José Basualdo	Sacked	28 February 2019	8th	(Paraguay) Celso Ayala	1 March 2019
Nacional	(Paraguay) Hugo Caballero	End of caretaker spell	4 March 2019	11th	(Paraguay) Aldo Bobadilla	4 March 2019
Libertad	(Colombia) Leonel Álvarez	Sacked	6 March 2019	8th	(Argentina) José Chamot	7 March 2019
Sol de América	(Paraguay) Alfredo Vera	End of caretaker spell	18 March 2019	9th	(Argentina) Javier Sanguinetti	19 March 2019
Deportivo Santaní	(Paraguay) Carlos Jara	Sacked	20 March 2019	12th	(Uruguay) Martín García	21 March 2019
General Díaz	(Paraguay) Luis Escobar	End of caretaker spell	18 April 2019	11th	(Paraguay) Cristian Martínez	18 April 2019
Deportivo Santaní	(Uruguay) Martín García	Resigned	21 April 2019	12th	(Paraguay) Pablo Caballero	22 April 2019
Torneo Clausura
Cerro Porteño	(Spain) Fernando Jubero	Mutual consent	20 May 2019	Pre-tournament	(Argentina) Miguel Ángel Russo	7 June 2019
Deportivo Capiatá	(Paraguay) Celso Ayala	Sacked	22 May 2019	Pre-tournament	(Argentina) Mario Jara	23 May 2019
Guaraní	(Paraguay) Gustavo Florentín	Mutual consent	29 May 2019	Pre-tournament	(Argentina) Gustavo Costas	6 June 2019
Deportivo Santaní	(Paraguay) Pablo Caballero	Resigned	4 June 2019	Pre-tournament	(Paraguay) Pedro Sarabia	6 June 2019
Deportivo Capiatá	(Argentina) Mario Jara	Sacked	25 August 2019	7th	(Paraguay) Héctor Marecos	25 August 2019
Sol de América	(Argentina) Javier Sanguinetti	Mutual consent	25 August 2019	9th	(Bolivia) Pablo Escobar	28 August 2019
Deportivo Santaní	(Paraguay) Pedro Sarabia	Sacked	26 August 2019	12th	(Paraguay) Robert Gauto (caretaker)	27 August 2019
Sportivo Luqueño	(Paraguay) Roberto Torres	Mutual consent	30 August 2019	11th	(Paraguay) Hugo Centurión	31 August 2019
Deportivo Santaní	(Paraguay) Robert Gauto	End of caretaker spell	31 August 2019	12th	(Argentina) Mario Jara	1 September 2019
Nacional	(Paraguay) Aldo Bobadilla	Signed by Independiente Medellín	4 September 2019	8th	(Paraguay) Francisco Arce	9 September 2019
Deportivo Capiatá	(Paraguay) Héctor Marecos	Sacked	26 September 2019	12th	(Paraguay) Carlos Recalde	26 September 2019
River Plate	(Paraguay) Daniel Farrar	Resigned	2 October 2019	8th	(Argentina) Marcelo Philipp	3 October 2019
Cerro Porteño	(Argentina) Miguel Ángel Russo	Mutual consent	8 October 2019	4th	(Argentina) Víctor Bernay (caretaker)	8 October 2019
Sportivo Luqueño	(Paraguay) Hugo Centurión	Sacked	8 October 2019	12th	(Paraguay) Celso Ayala	8 October 2019
Deportivo Santaní	(Argentina) Mario Jara	Resigned	27 October 2019	10th	(Paraguay) Robert Gauto (caretaker)	27 October 2019

== Torneo Apertura ==
The Campeonato de Apertura, named "Víctor Genes", was the 119th official championship of the Primera División and the first championship of the 2019 season. It started on January 22 and concluded on May 20.

=== Standings ===
Pos	Team	Pld	W	D	L	GF	GA	GD	Pts	Qualification
1	Olimpia (C)	22	16	6	0	61	17	+44	54	Qualification for Copa Libertadores group stage
2	Cerro Porteño	22	13	4	5	48	25	+23	43	
3	Libertad	22	11	4	7	39	29	+10	37	
4	Guaraní	22	10	7	5	37	29	+8	37	
5	Sportivo Luqueño	22	8	7	7	28	30	−2	31	
6	River Plate	22	7	7	8	25	31	−6	28	
7	San Lorenzo	22	8	3	11	33	37	−4	27	
8	Deportivo Capiatá	22	6	8	8	24	32	−8	26	
9	Sol de América	22	8	2	12	31	43	−12	26	
10	Nacional	22	5	8	9	19	27	−8	23	
11	General Díaz	22	3	7	12	22	41	−19	16	
12	Deportivo Santaní	22	2	7	13	15	38	−23	13	

Source: APF, Soccerway
Rules for classification: 1) Points, 2) Playoff game (only if needed to decide championship between two teams), 3) Goal difference, 4) Goals for, 5) Away goals for, 6) Drawing of lots.
(C) Champions

=== Results ===
Home \ Away	CCP	CAP	SAN	GEN	GUA	LIB	NAC	OLI	RIV	SSL	SOL	SLU
Cerro Porteño	—	1–0	3–2	2–0	5–2	1–2	1–1	1–3	3–1	1–1	7–2	2–0
Deportivo Capiatá	1–1	—	2–1	2–2	0–1	2–1	1–0	2–2	3–3	1–1	3–2	1–3
Deportivo Santaní	1–3	0–0	—	0–1	1–1	0–3	1–2	0–6	1–1	1–0	2–3	0–1
General Díaz	1–3	1–0	2–0	—	1–1	1–3	1–1	0–2	0–1	3–3	1–4	0–0
Guaraní	0–1	1–2	0–0	1–1	—	3–1	2–2	1–5	2–1	4–1	3–1	2–2
Libertad	1–0	5–1	4–0	4–0	1–1	—	1–2	2–3	2–1	2–1	2–2	1–0
Nacional	0–3	2–1	0–0	1–0	0–2	0–1	—	2–4	0–0	3–1	0–1	0–1
Olimpia	2–2	3–0	2–2	4–1	2–0	3–0	0–0	—	0–0	2–0	4–0	2–0
River Plate	1–5	1–0	1–2	3–2	0–1	1–1	1–1	2–2	—	2–1	1–0	2–1
San Lorenzo	2–1	0–1	2–0	2–1	1–3	3–0 (Note: Match awarded 3–0 to San Lorenzo due to Libertad fielding more foreign players than allowed. The match originally ended with a 3–4 win for Libertad.)	1–0	1–4	1–0	—	2–4	0–3
Sol de América	0–1	0–0	1–0	3–0	1–4	2–0	3–1	0–1	0–1	1–6	—	0–1
Sportivo Luqueño	2–1	1–1	1–1	2–2	0–2	2–2	1–1	1–5	3–1	0–3	3–1	—

Source: APF, Soccerway
Legend: Blue = home team win; Yellow = draw; Red = away team win.

=== Top goalscorers ===
Rank	Name	Club	Goals
1	(Paraguay) William Mendieta	Olimpia	11
1	(Paraguay) Roque Santa Cruz	Olimpia	11
3	(Uruguay) Sebastián Fernández	San Lorenzo	9
3	(Paraguay) Jorge Ortega	Olimpia	9
3	(Paraguay) César Villagra	Sol de América	9
6	(Paraguay) José Ortigoza	Guaraní	8
6	(Paraguay) Nildo Viera	River Plate	8
8	(Paraguay) Jorge Benítez	Cerro Porteño	7
8	(Paraguay) Óscar Cardozo	Libertad	7
8	(Argentina) Joaquín Larrivey	Cerro Porteño	7

Source: Soccerway

=== Attendances ===
#	Football club	Home games	Average attendance
1	Cerro Porteño	11	15,753
2	Club Olimpia	11	11,323
3	Deportivo Santaní	11	3,392
4	CS San Lorenzo	11	2,369
5	Deportivo Capiatá	11	1,522
6	Sportivo Luqueño	11	1,196
7	Club Libertad	11	1,074
8	Club Sol de América	11	957
9	Club Guaraní	11	935
10	Club General Díaz	11	874
11	CRP	11	537
12	Club Nacional	11	514

== Torneo Clausura ==
The Campeonato de Clausura, named "Ranulfo Miranda y 100 años de la Cruz Roja Paraguaya", was the 120th official championship of the Primera División and the second championship of the 2019 season. It started on July 12 and concluded on December 15.

=== Standings ===
Pos	Team	Pld	W	D	L	GF	GA	GD	Pts	Qualification
1	Olimpia (C)	22	17	3	2	53	15	+38	54	Qualification for Copa Libertadores group stage
2	Libertad	22	15	3	4	35	12	+23	48	
3	Cerro Porteño	22	11	4	7	42	28	+14	37	
4	Guaraní	22	9	5	8	32	28	+4	32	
5	Sol de América	22	8	7	7	22	23	−1	31	
6	Nacional	22	7	8	7	29	27	+2	29	
7	General Díaz	22	6	7	9	27	33	−6	25	
8	River Plate	22	6	6	10	18	24	−6	24	
9	San Lorenzo	22	5	7	10	23	36	−13	22	
10	Sportivo Luqueño	22	5	6	11	20	37	−17	21	
11	Deportivo Capiatá	22	5	6	11	18	38	−20	21	
12	Deportivo Santaní	22	5	4	13	20	39	−19	19	

Source: APF, Soccerway
Rules for classification: 1) Points, 2) Playoff game (only if needed to decide championship between two teams), 3) Goal difference, 4) Goals for, 5) Away goals for, 6) Drawing of lots.
(C) Champions

=== Results ===
Home \ Away	CCP	CAP	SAN	GEN	GUA	LIB	NAC	OLI	RIV	SSL	SOL	SLU
Cerro Porteño	—	3–0	4–0	2–4	2–2	1–3	5–0	0–0	2–0	2–0	1–0	1–2
Deportivo Capiatá	3–2	—	3–1	0–2	1–2	1–1	0–0	0–6	0–1	1–1	0–4	1–0
Deportivo Santaní	0–2	1–2	—	1–1	2–1	1–0	3–1	0–1	0–1	1–1	1–1	2–3
General Díaz	2–2	3–1	0–1	—	0–3	1–0	1–1	1–4	1–1	1–1	0–3	3–0
Guaraní	1–2	2–1	2–1	5–0	—	1–1	0–5	1–1	1–3	3–1	0–1	1–3
Libertad	2–1	2–0	2–0	3–1	1–0	—	2–0	2–0	2–1	3–0	1–0	0–0
Nacional	1–1	3–0	4–0	0–0	0–2	1–0	—	1–3	1–1	4–2	0–0	1–1
Olimpia	4–2	1–0	4–0	2–0	2–2	2–1	3–0	—	2–1	4–1	2–0	3–1
River Plate	1–2	1–1	1–0	1–0	0–1	0–2	0–1	0–1	—	0–0	2–2	1–1
San Lorenzo	2–1	1–1	3–2	1–1	0–0	0–1	0–3	1–4	2–0	—	1–2	2–0
Sol de América	0–2	1–1	2–2	1–0	0–1	0–1	2–1	0–4	1–0	1–0	—	2–2
Sportivo Luqueño	1–2	0–1	0–1	0–5	1–0	1–5	1–1	1–0	1–2	1–3	0–0	—

Source: APF, Soccerway
Legend: Blue = home team win; Yellow = draw; Red = away team win.

=== Top goalscorers ===
Rank	Name	Club	Goals
1	(Paraguay) Roque Santa Cruz	Olimpia	15
2	(Paraguay) Antonio Bareiro	Libertad	10
3	(Paraguay) Santiago Salcedo	Deportivo Capiatá	9
4	(Paraguay) Fernando Fernández	Guaraní	8
4	(Paraguay) Brian Montenegro	Olimpia	8
6	(Argentina) Diego Churín	Cerro Porteño	6
6	(Paraguay) Nelson Haedo Valdez	Cerro Porteño	6
6	(Paraguay) José Ortigoza	Guaraní	6
6	(Paraguay) Óscar Ruiz	Cerro Porteño	6
6	(Uruguay) Alejandro Silva	Olimpia	6
6	(Paraguay) Leonardo Villagra	Nacional	6

Source: Soccerway

== Aggregate table ==
Pos	Team	Pld	W	D	L	GF	GA	GD	Pts	Qualification
1	Olimpia (C)	44	33	9	2	114	32	+82	108	Qualification for Copa Libertadores group stage
2	Libertad	44	26	7	11	74	41	+33	85	Qualification for Copa Libertadores group stage
3	Cerro Porteño	44	24	8	12	90	53	+37	80	Qualification for Copa Libertadores second stage
4	Guaraní	44	19	12	13	68	57	+11	69	Qualification for Copa Libertadores first stage
5	Sol de América	44	16	9	19	53	66	−13	57	Qualification for Copa Sudamericana first stage
6	Nacional	44	12	16	16	48	54	−6	52	Qualification for Copa Sudamericana first stage
7	River Plate	44	13	13	18	43	55	−12	52	Qualification for Copa Sudamericana first stage
8	Sportivo Luqueño	44	13	13	18	47	66	−19	52	Qualification for Copa Sudamericana first stage (Note: Sportivo Luqueño qualified for the Copa Sudamericana first stage since Deportivo Capiatá, the 2019 Copa Paraguay third-placed team, were relegated and lost the right to claim their berth.)
9	San Lorenzo	44	13	10	21	56	73	−17	49	
10	Deportivo Capiatá	44	11	14	19	42	70	−28	47	
11	General Díaz	44	9	14	21	49	74	−25	41	
12	Deportivo Santaní	44	7	11	26	35	77	−42	32	

Source: APF
Rules for classification: 1) Points, 2) Playoff game (only if needed to decide international qualification between two teams), 3) Goal difference, 4) Goals for, 5) Away goals for, 6) Drawing of lots.
(C) Champions

== Relegation ==
Relegation is determined at the end of the season by computing an average of the number of points earned per game over the past three seasons. The two teams with the lowest average were relegated to the División Intermedia for the following season.

Pos	Team	2017 Pts	2018 Pts	2019 Pts	Total Pts	Total Pld	Avg	Relegation
1	Olimpia	78	102	108	288	132	2.182	
2	Cerro Porteño	80	82	80	242	132	1.833	
3	Libertad	75	76	85	236	132	1.788	
4	Guaraní	85	48	69	202	132	1.53	
5	Sol de América	62	63	57	182	132	1.379	
6	Nacional	50	65	52	167	132	1.265	
7	River Plate	—	—	52	52	44	1.182	
8	Sportivo Luqueño	50	46	52	148	132	1.121	
9	San Lorenzo	—	—	49	49	44	1.114	
10	General Díaz	60	46	41	147	132	1.114	
11	Deportivo Capiatá (R)	50	45	47	142	132	1.076	Relegation to División Intermedia
12	Deportivo Santaní (R)	—	50	32	82	88	0.932	Relegation to División Intermedia

Updated to games played on 15 December 2019. Source: APF
