= Óscar Cardozo =

Paraguayan footballer (born 1983)

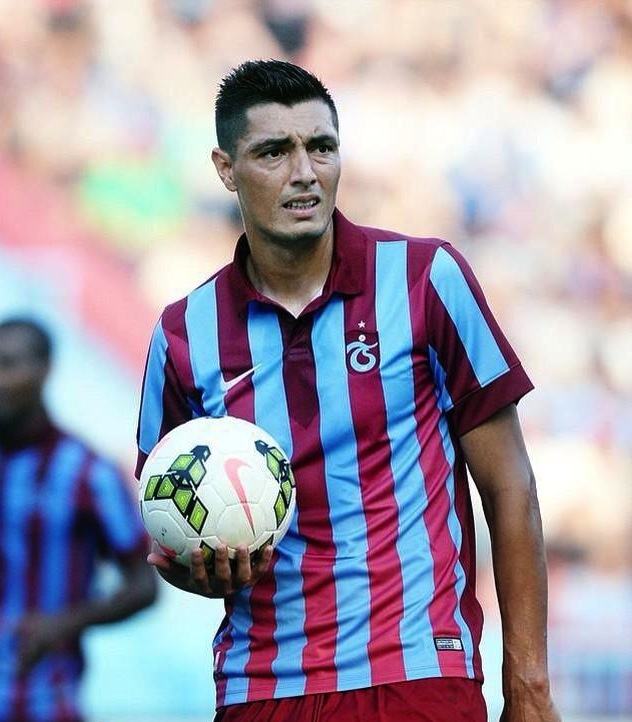
- Cardozo in 2014

Personal information
- Full name: Óscar René Cardozo Marín
- Date of birth: 20 May 1983 (age 43)
- Place of birth: Raúl Arsenio Oviedo, Paraguay
- Height: 1.93 m (6 ft 4 in)
- Position: Striker

Youth career
- Club 24 de Junio

Senior career*
Years	Team	Apps	(Gls)
2003–2004	3 de Febrero	34	(20)
2004–2006	Nacional Asunción	63	(22)
2006–2007	Newell's Old Boys	33	(21)
2007–2014	Benfica	175	(112)
2014–2016	Trabzonspor	50	(25)
2016–2017	Olympiacos	22	(3)
2017–2025	Libertad	288	(110)
Total		630	(300)

International career^{‡}
2006–2023	Paraguay	58	(12)
- * Club domestic league appearances and goals as of 7:03, 03 February 2026 (UTC) ‡ National team caps and goals as of 21 November 2023 (UTC)

Óscar René Cardozo Marín (Spanish pronunciation: [ˈoskaɾ reˈne kaɾˈðoso maˈɾin]; born 20 May 1983), best known as Tacuara (Guarani for Guadua), is a Paraguayan former professional footballer who played as a striker.

Known for his powerful left-foot shot and free-kick skills, he first gained attention whilst playing for Newell's Old Boys, which led to a move to Benfica in 2007. He scored nearly 200 official goals for the Portuguese club and won eight major titles, including the 2010 national championship, where he also was the top scorer, and the domestic treble in the 2013–14 season. He then spent two years with Trabzonspor in Turkey before joining Olympiacos.

Nicknamed "Tacuara" (from Takuára – Big cane in Guarani), Cardozo gained more than 50 caps for Paraguay, representing the nation at the 2007 Copa América, 2010 FIFA World Cup and 2019 Copa América. In 2006 and 2009, he was named Paraguayan Footballer of the Year.

== Early life ==
Cardozo is the son of Rosa María, who claimed that "Óscar has been a very good son and has managed to help us and take us away from poverty". His father is Arnaldo and his parents have five children.

== Club career ==
=== Club Atlético 3 de Febrero ===
==== 2003 season ====
Cardozo commenced his professional career with modest Club Atlético 3 de Febrero of Ciudad del Este, participating in the División Intermedia championship in 2003 and forming a partner ship with striker Roberto Gamarra. In Round 1 of the 2003 season, Cardozo scored in a 1–1 home draw against Cerro Corá. In the following fixture, he scored in a 2–0 home victory against Sportivo Iteño on 11 May. Two weeks later, he netted in a 3–0 home victory against River Plate Asunción on 25 May. Cardozo would not score again until Round 11, where the player scored the only goal in a 1–0 away victory for 3 de Febrero against Cerro Porteño de Presidente Franco on 13 July. The following week, Cardozo would again score against Cerro Corá in a 1–1 away draw on 27 July.

On 10 August, Cardozo scored his first double in a 2–0 home victory against Nacional Asunción. On 7 May, Cardozo would score the only goal for 3 de Febrero as they were defeated 3–1 away against River Plate Asunción on 16 August. In the following fixture, Cardozo would again score, this time in a 1–1 home draw against Presidente Hayes on 23 August. On 30 August, Cardozo scored in a 5–1 away thrashing against Colegiales, which totaled to five consecutive goals in four matches. Cardozo's last league goal would come in Round 21, when the player netted in a 2–1 away victory against Deportivo Recoleta on 27 September. 3 de Febrero had finished in 2nd place of the División Intermedia table and were drawn into promotion play-off fixtures. On 12 October, Cardozo scored in 3 de Febrero's 4–2 victory against River Plate Asunción and one week later would score against Cerro Corá in his side's 2–0 victory on 19 October. Cardozo again scored in the following play-off fixture, a 3–2 victory against General Caballero Zeballos Cué on 25 October. Having won three qualifying promotion play-off fixtures successfully, 3 de Febrero ultimately faced Club Tacuary in a promotion-relegation play-off, which saw the latter win 4–2 on aggregate.

==== 2004 season ====
Cardozo scored his first goal of the 2004 División Intermedia season in a 1–0 away victory against Cerro Corá in Round 6 on 2 May, with 3 de Febrero continuing an undefeated run. One week later, Cardozo scored a double against Sportivo San Lorenzo in a 2–0 home victory on 7 May. In the following round, 3 de Febrero suffered their first defeat of the season after 8 eight rounds in a 1–0 away defeat against General Caballero, however, consistent results continued as Cardozo scored in a 1–1 draw in the Superclásico of Alto Paraná against Cerro Porteño PF one week later on 23 May. Cardozo scored his 5th league goal of the season in a 2–1 home victory against Cerro Corá in Round 15 on 9 July. 3 de Febrero had been on a 9-game undefeated streak, which ultimately lasted until Round 18, the last match of the season against Cerro Porteño PF which they narrowly lost 4–3 on 31 July. The match saw Cardozo score his 6th league goal of the season and his final goal as a 3 de Febrero player. Cardozo then joined Nacional Asunción during the 2004 season. Before signing with Nacional Asunción, Cardozo had played in 12 out of 3 de Febrero's 18 league matches, scoring 6 goals, which ultimately saw the club finish in first position of the División Intermedia, with 34 points and having lost just two league matches, and gain promotion to the 2005 Paraguayan Primera División season. Cardozo went on to participate in the second half of the 2004 season for Club Nacional Asunción, participating in the Torneo Clasura.

=== Club Nacional ===
In 2004, he moved to the top level with Asunción's Club Nacional, where he quickly established himself as the team's top scorer, scoring 17 overall goals in his last season.

=== Newell's Old Boys ===
Cardozo arrived at Argentina and Newell's Old Boys in the second half of the 2006–07 season for a transfer fee of $1.2 million, joining compatriots Diego Gavilán, Santiago Salcedo and Justo Villar. He netted 11 goals in only 16 games in the Apertura, but his team could only finish 18th in the tournament, and 13th overall. As a result of his performances, he was voted the 2006 Paraguayan Footballer of the Year.

=== S.L. Benfica ===
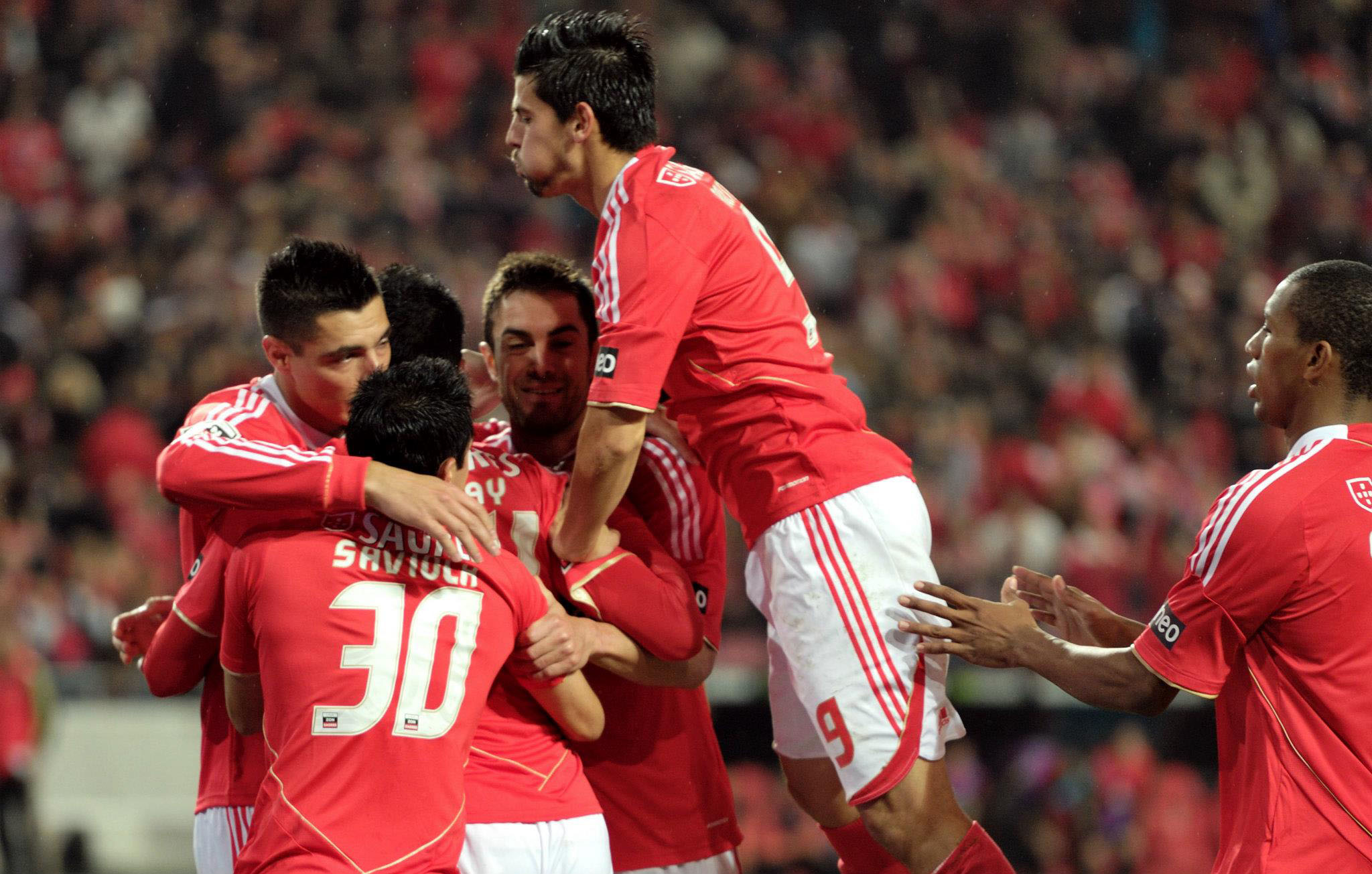
Cardozo (left) celebrating a Benfica goal in 2011

On 21 June 2007, Cardozo officially signed for Portuguese club Benfica, after being bought for an approximate €9.1 million for 80% of his playing rights– this made him the second most expensive signing in the club's history, only surpassed by Simão for whom the club paid €13 million in 2001. Cardozo finished his first season with 22 official goals, but Benfica came out empty in silverware. On 22 February 2008, he scored a last-minute goal against 1. FC Nürnberg for the campaign's UEFA Cup (2–2 away draw, 3–2 aggregate win), thereby keeping his promise of surpassing the 20-goal mark.

In 2008–09 Cardozo scored 17 goals, all in the league, including the equalizer against Porto on 30 August 2008. He finished second in the Bola de Prata race, losing only to Nenê of Nacional. In April 2008, Benfica bought out the remaining 20% of his rights for a further €2.5 million, thus investing €11.6 million total in his economic rights.

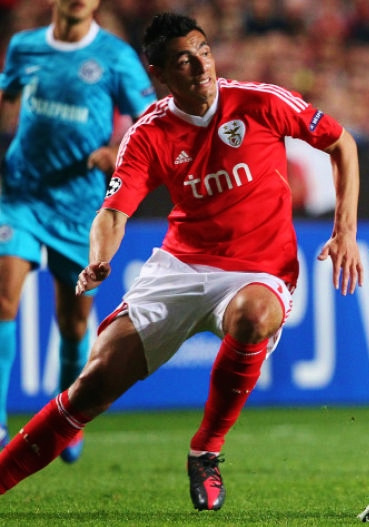
Cardozo playing against Zenit in 2012

Cardozo had a very positive 2009–10 pre-season, netting eight times in ten matches. On 31 August 2009, in the third league game, he scored a hat-trick in an 8–1 home demolition of Vitória de Setúbal. On 22 October, in the Europa League group stage match against Everton, Tacuara netted twice in two minutes in a 5–0 thrashing at the Estádio da Luz, and added a further three in the league against Nacional (6–1, at home), and with Académica de Coimbra (4–0, home).

In the Europa League quarter-finals against Liverpool, Cardozo scored two penalties for a 2–1 home win. He also found the net in the second leg at Anfield with a free kick, but in a 1–4 loss and subsequent elimination; as Benfica won the national championship, adding the year's domestic League Cup, he finished with a career-high 38 goals in 47 matches (26 in the domestic league, leading Porto's Radamel Falcao by only one), partnering well with Argentine Javier Saviola. On 10 February 2010, Benfica sold 20% of his economic rights to Benfica Stars Fund for €4 million, valuing him at €20 million.

At the end of the 2011–12 campaign Cardozo was crowned the Primeira Liga's top scorer for the second time, with 20 goals – joint with Braga's Lima – as Benfica finished in second position. On 10 December 2012, he scored three in a 3–1 Lisbon derby win at Sporting (even though one of the goals was initially attributed to Marcos Rojo as an own goal), repeating the feat the following week at home against Marítimo (4–1), which resulted in him surpassing the 100-goal mark in domestic league play.

On 2 January 2013, Cardozo took his season tally to 21 goals in 19 official games after netting three in a 6–0 home routing of Desportivo das Aves for the campaign's Taça de Portugal. On 2 May, he scored his fifth and sixth in eight contests in the season's Europa League, being crucial to a 3–1 home win against Fenerbahçe in the semi-finals second leg with the subsequent 3–2 aggregate qualification to the final in Amsterdam. In the decisive match, he netted from the penalty spot in the 68th minute for the 1–1 equalizer against Chelsea, who won it 2–1.

Cardozo was replaced after 70 minutes in the domestic cup final on 26 May 2013, with Benfica leading 1–0 but then losing 1–2 to Vitória de Guimarães. At the end of the game, he angrily confronted manager Jorge Jesus, inclusively pushing him; he later apologised for his actions, being fined for half of his monthly salary.

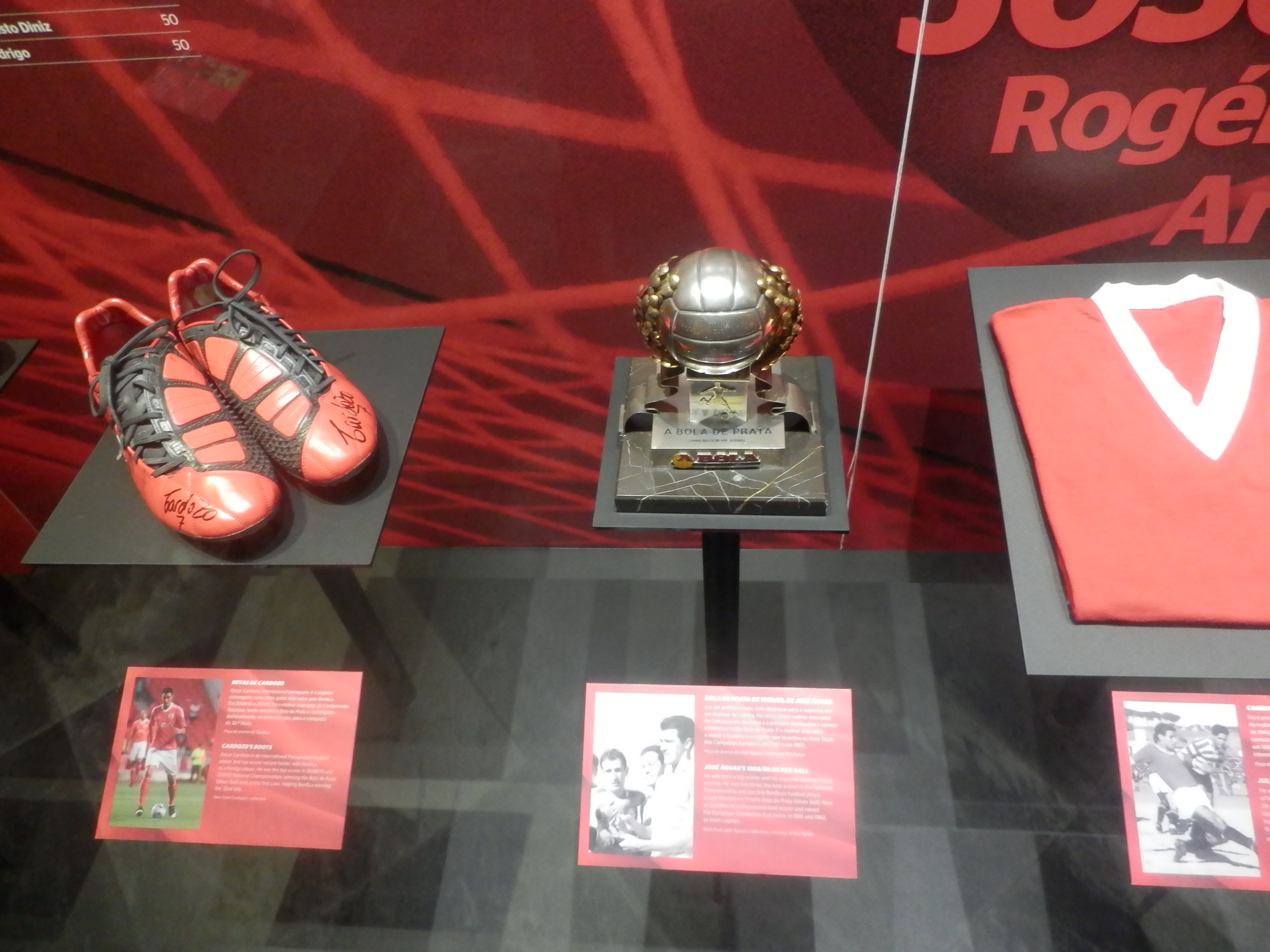
Cardozo's boots at the Museu Benfica

Cardozo started the new season after his teammates due to the controversy, but soon returned to his scoring ways. His goals against Guimarães, Estoril, and Nacional were vital in keeping Benfica in the race for the title. On 9 November 2013, he put three past Sporting in a 4–3 home win for the domestic cup's fourth round, increasing to 13 the goals he scored against Sporting, surpassing Manuel Fernandes in the list of top goalscorers of the Lisbon derby. In November 2013, an injury ruled him out for 2 1/2 months. When he returned, he found himself relegated to the bench, with the team now fully adapted to play with Lima and Rodrigo. On 1 February, after missing his ninth penalty kick in Primeira Liga, in a match against Gil Vicente, Cardozo became the player with most missed penalties in the competition.

On 14 May 2014, Cardozo missed a penalty shootout against Sevilla in a Europa League final loss on penalties. He still finished the campaign with 11 goals all competitions comprised, including seven in the domestic league which was won for the 33rd time.

In early August 2014, Trabzonspor announced they were negotiating with Benfica and Cardozo. On 4 August 2014, Cardozo left Benfica and thanked the club by stating, "You will always be in my heart".

Cardozo played for Benfica since 2007 and, together with Maxi Pereira and Luisão, was one of the team captains. He is Benfica's ninth all-time goalscorer, second in European competitions, and the highest-scoring foreigner at the club, with 172 goals.

=== Trabzonspor ===
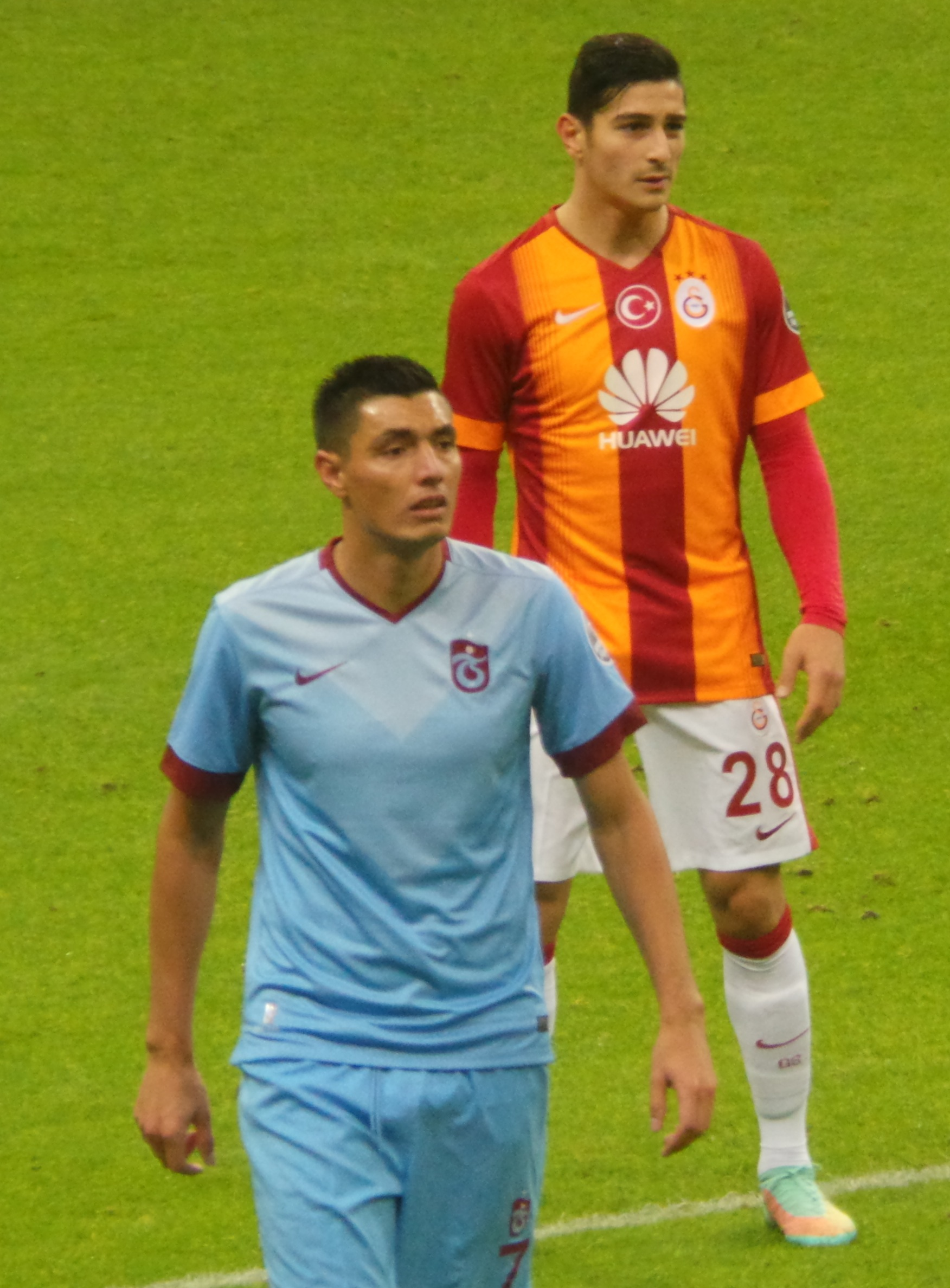
Cardozo playing for Trabzonspor against Galatasaray in 2014

On 4 August 2014, Cardozo moved Turkish Süper Lig side Trabzonspor for a €5 million fee, (Benfica received €4 million, the fund €1 million) with a further €1.65 million contingent on performance-related bonuses. He signed a contract with €2.5 million per season plus bonuses.

On 21 August, he scored his first goal for the club, in a 2–0 home win against Russian side Rostov for the campaign's UEFA Europa League. Cardozo made his league debut in a 1–1 away draw against İstanbul Başakşehir on 22 September. He came onto the field in the 52nd minute for Fatih Atik, and scored a 93rd-minute penalty to equalise.

On 1 December, Cardozo scored his first hat-trick in a 4–1 home victory against Gençlerbirliği. He scored in the 8th, 40th and 65th minutes of the match before being substituted off of the field for Fatih Atik in the 70th minute. Cardozo brought his goal scoring tally to eight goals in nine league appearances. During a group stage match of the 2014–15 Turkish Cup, Cardozo scored a double in Trabzonspor's 9–0 home victory against Manisaspor on 25 December.

Cardozo rounded off the season scoring 17 league goals in 29 appearances as Trabzonspor finished in fifth place and qualified for the 2015–16 UEFA Europa League second qualifying round. He finished in third place of the Süper Lig top goalscorers list, behind Demba Ba (18 goals) and Fernandão (22 goals).

After the 2014–15 season, it was announced that Cardozo would not play in the 2015 Copa América for Paraguay due to a back injury, whereupon it was then revealed by his agent that he had been playing through the pain for his club side.

=== Olympiacos ===
On 31 August 2016, Cardozo joined Greek champions Olympiacos. He scored his first goal in the Super League Greece on 12 December that year, opening the score in a 2–0 away win over PAS Giannina and thus ending his seven-match goalless run.

=== Libertad ===
==== 2017–22: Back-to-back Torneo Apertura titles ====
On 28 June 2017, Cardozo signed with Libertad in Paraguay. In his first match for the team, Cardozo scored a double in a 5–1 away win over Huracán in the 2017 Copa Sudamericana on 12 July. On 13 February 2019, he scored a half-way line goal, the fourth in a 5–1 home win over Bolivian side The Strongest in the second qualifying stage of the Copa Libertadores.

On 5 November 2019, he scored the opening goal of Libertad's 4–1 away victory over Sol América in the Copa Paraguay semifinals. In the following month, on 4 December, Libertad won their first Copa Paraguay after beating Guaraní 3–0. Cardozo came on in the 83rd minute of the final.

On 21 May 2021, Libertad faced Sol América on the last matchday of the 2021 Torneo Apertura with the title on the line, but Cardozo did not play the match due to having tested positive for COVID-19 a few days before. Without him, Libertad lost 0–1, but two days later, the club secured their twenty-first league title after Nacional failed to win their match. Cardozo contributed with nine goals and nine assists during the campaign. On 25 June 2022, Libertad faced fellow title contenders Cerro Porteño on the penultimate matchday of the 2022 Torneo Apertura, winning the match 1–0 and thus securing their twenty-second league title.

==== 2023: Best player in Paraguay at the age of 40 ====
On 3 April 2023, Cardozo scored four goals in a 5–0 trashing of Cerro Porteño, marking his first-ever poker in his professional career, with his final goal of the night being also his 100th with the Libertad shirt in official competitions, thus becoming the second player in the history of Libertad to do so after Juan Samudio. In doing so at the age of 39 years and 318 days, he became the oldest player to score a poker in the 21st century, surpassing Pablo Escobar's record from 2018 by 19 days, as well as the second in history, only behind Josef Bican in 1955, aged 41. In the following month, on 4 May, just 16 days shy from his 40th birthday, Cardozo scored the opening goal in an eventual 1–2 loss to Athletico Paranaense in the 2023 Copa Libertadores group stage, thus becoming one of the oldest goalscorers in Copa Libertadores history. Libertad finished third in the group and it was therefore relegated to the 2023 Copa Sudamericana final stages, where on 13 July, Cardozo scored a last-minute winner against Atlético Tigre in the first leg of the knockout round play-offs in an eventual 3–1 aggregate win. On 20 October, he scored his 400th career goal in a 3–0 win over Sportivo Ameliano. On 26 November, Cardozo scored a brace in a 3–1 comeback victory over Club Olimpia, the first from the penalty spot and the second with a free-kick, while Libertad's third goal was scored by his fellow 40-year-old attacking partner Roque Santa Cruz.

At the end of the season, the 40-year-old Cardozo emerged as the top scorer of the 2023 Paraguayan Primera División season and with ease, being the top scorer in both the Apertura tournament (10 goals) and the Clausura tournament (11 goals) for a total of 21 goals in the Paraguayan league, which was 7 more than his closest pursuer, the 23-year-old Gustavo Aguilar. Furthermore, Cardozo was also champion in both tournaments and then helped Libertad win the Paraguay Cup to complete the domestic treble. On 5 December 2023, the Paraguayan Football Association elected him as the best player in Paraguay, becoming the oldest player to do so in the process.

==== 2024–present: Libertad all-time top scorer ====
On 30 May 2024, Cardozo scored a first-half equaliser in an eventual 2–1 win over Uruguay's Club Nacional in the last match of the 2024 Copa Libertadores group stage, becoming, at the age of 41 years and 10 days, the fourth-oldest player to score in the Copa Libertadores. The following week, on 5 June 2024, he scored a free-kick against Club Olimpia to help his team to a 3–1 win. Later that year, on 29 November 2024, Cardozo scored a stoppage-time equaliser from the penalty spot in an eventual 3–2 victory over Cerro Porteño in the Torneo Apertura; this was his 132nd goal for Libertad, overtaking Juan Samudio to become the club's all-time top scorer. The following week, on 6 December, he played in the final of the 2024 Copa Paraguay, coming off the bench in the second-half to help his side to a 1–0 win over Nacional. In total, he scored 12 goals and made two assists in 47 games for Libertad in 2024.

On 27 May 2025, just seven days after turning 42, Cardozo converted a penalty in a 2–2 draw with Alianza Lima, whose forward 41-year-old Paolo Guerrero also scored, marking the first time in the history of Copa Libertadores that two 40-year-old players scored for each team in the same match. This goal also saw him become the third-oldest goalscorer in the history of the Copa Libertadores, only behind his teammate Roque Santa Cruz in 2024 (42 years and 8 months) and Zé Roberto in 2017 (42 years and 10 months).

=== Retirement ===
On 15 April 2026, Cardozo announced his retirement from professional football.

== International career ==
On 7 October 2006, Cardozo made his international debut for Paraguay in an exhibition game with Australia, and he scored his first goal on 5 June of the following year in another friendly, against Mexico. He was selected for the squad that appeared in that year's Copa América: the tournament in Venezuela ended in the quarter-finals and the player netted once, in a 3–1 group stage win against the United States.

Cardozo scored two goals in the 2010 FIFA World Cup qualification stages, as Paraguay qualified for the finals in South Africa. On 29 June 2010, he netted the winning penalty in the shootout against Japan (5–3 victory), as La Albirroja qualified for the World Cup quarter-finals for the first time ever. In the following game, however, with the score at 0–0, he missed a 59th-minute penalty against Spain in a 0–1 defeat against the eventual champions.

Cardozo was overlooked by coach Gerardo Martino for the 2011 Copa América squad, despite scoring 23 official goals for Benfica in 2010–11. Having already been included by Ramón Díaz in the Albirroja preliminary squad, Cardozo would again miss out 2015 Copa América due to a back injury. On 16 June 2019, aged 36, he scored against Qatar in Copa América and became the oldest player in Paraguay's history to score in that competition, breaking Delfín Benítez Cáceres' 1946 record.

== Personal life ==
In spite of the same surname, a similar nickname and physical resemblance, he is not related to Ramón Cardozo (known as "Tacuarita"), who is also a footballer and a forward. He obtained Portuguese citizenship in November 2014.

== Career statistics ==
=== Club ===
As of match played 13 October 2024

Appearances and goals by club, season and competition
Club	Season	League			National cup (Note: Includes Taça de Portugal, Turkish Cup, Greek Football Cup, Copa Paraguay)		League cup (Note: Includes Taça da Liga)		Continental		Other		Total	
Club	Season	Division	Apps	Goals	Apps	Goals	Apps	Goals	Apps	Goals	Apps	Goals	Apps	Goals
3 de Febrero	2003	Paraguayan División Intermedia	22	14	–		–		–		–		22	14
3 de Febrero	2004	Paraguayan División Intermedia	12	6	–		–		–		–		12	6
3 de Febrero	Total		34	20	–		–		–		–		34	20
Nacional Asunción	2004	Paraguayan Primera División	14	3	–		–		–		–		14	3
Nacional Asunción	2005	Paraguayan Primera División	29	9	–		–		–		–		29	9
Nacional Asunción	2006	Paraguayan Primera División	20	10	–		–		0	0	–		20	10
Nacional Asunción	Total		63	22	–		–		0	0	–		63	22
Newell's Old Boys	2006–07	Argentine Primera División	33	21	–		–		–		–		33	21
Benfica	2007–08	Primeira Liga	29	13	5	5	0	0	11 (Note: Eight appearances and three goals in UEFA Champions League, three appearances and one goal in UEFA Cup)	4	–		45	22
Benfica	2008–09	Primeira Liga	26	17	2	0	4	0	3 (Note: Appearances in UEFA Cup)	0	–		35	17
Benfica	2009–10	Primeira Liga	29	26	0	0	5	2	13 (Note: Appearances in UEFA Europa League)	10	–		47	38
Benfica	2010–11	Primeira Liga	22	12	5	5	2	1	12 (Note: Four appearances and one goal in UEFA Champions League, eight appearances and four goals in UEFA Europa League)	5	1 (Note: Appearance in Supertaça Cândido de Oliveira)	0	42	23
Benfica	2011–12	Primeira Liga	29	20	0	0	4	3	12 (Note: Appearances in UEFA Champions League)	5	–		45	28
Benfica	2012–13	Primeira Liga	25	17	5	6	2	1	14 (Note: Five appearances and two goals in UEFA Champions League, nine appearances and seven goals in UEFA Europa League)	9	–		46	33
Benfica	2013–14	Primeira Liga	15	7	5	3	1	0	11 (Note: Four appearances and two goals in UEFA Champions League, seven appearances in UEFA Europa League)	1	–		32	11
Benfica	Total		175	112	22	19	18	7	76	34	1	0	292	172
Trabzonspor	2014–15	Süper Lig	29	17	3	2	–		10	1	–		42	20
Trabzonspor	2015–16	Süper Lig	21	8	1	0	–		2	0	–		24	8
Trabzonspor	Total		50	25	4	2	–		12	1	–		66	28
Olympiacos	2016–17	Super League Greece	22	3	7	0	–		5	0	–		34	3
Libertad	2017	Paraguayan Primera División	14	4	–		–		6 (Note: Appearances in Copa Sudamericana)	4	–		20	8
Libertad	2018	Paraguayan Primera División	43	23	0	0	–		6 (Note: Appearances in Copa Libertadores)	5	–		49	28
Libertad	2019	Paraguayan Primera División	32	9	3	1	–		11	4	–		46	14
Libertad	2020	Paraguayan Primera División	31	13	–		–		9	4	–		40	17
Libertad	2021	Paraguayan Primera División	30	12	0	0	–		8 (Note: Two appearances in Copa Libertadores, six appearances in Copa Sudamericana)	0	–		38	12
Libertad	2022	Paraguayan Primera División	34	13	0	0	–		7	1	–		41	14
Libertad	2023	Paraguayan Primera División	39	21	3	1	–		8 (Note: Four appearances and two goals in Copa Libertadores, four appearances and one goal in Copa Sudamericana)	3	0	0	50	25
Libertad	2024	Paraguayan Primera División	30	8	1	0	–		7 (Note: Three appearances and one goal in Copa Libertadores, four appearances and two goals in Copa Sudamericana)	3	0	0	38	11
Libertad	2025	Paraguayan Primera División	21	5										
Libertad	Total		253	103	7	2	–		62	24	0	0	323	129
Career total			630	300	40	23	18	7	153	59	1	0	843	395

=== International ===
As of match played 21 November 2023

Appearances and goals by national team and year
National team	Year	Apps	Goals
Paraguay	2006	2	0
Paraguay	2007	10	2
Paraguay	2008	10	1
Paraguay	2009	7	1
Paraguay	2010	6	0
Paraguay	2011	7	4
Paraguay	2012	3	1
Paraguay	2013	4	0
Paraguay	2014	0	0
Paraguay	2015	0	0
Paraguay	2016	0	0
Paraguay	2017	2	1
Paraguay	2018	0	0
Paraguay	2019	4	2
Paraguay	2020	0	0
Paraguay	2021	2	0
Paraguay	2022	0	0
Paraguay	2023	1	0
Total		58	12

Scores and results list Paraguay's goal tally first, score column indicates score after each Cardozo goal.

List of international goals scored by Óscar Cardozo
No.	Date	Venue	Opponent	Score	Result	Competition
1	5 June 2007	Estadio Azteca, Mexico City, Mexico	Mexico	1–0	1–0	Friendly
2	28 June 2007	Estadio Agustín Tovar, Barinas, Venezuela	United States	2–1	3–1	2007 Copa América
3	15 October 2008	Estadio Defensores del Chaco, Asunción, Paraguay	Peru	1–0	1–0	2010 FIFA World Cup qualification
4	10 October 2009	Polideportivo Cachamay, Ciudad Guayana, Venezuela	Venezuela	2–0	2–1	2010 FIFA World Cup qualification
5	29 March 2011	LP Field, Nashville, United States	United States	1–0	1–0	Friendly
6	2 September 2011	Estadio Rommel Fernández, Panama City, Panama	Panama	1–0	2–0	Friendly
7	6 September 2011	Estadio Olímpico Metropolitano, San Pedro Sula, Honduras	Honduras	2–0	3–0	Friendly
8	6 September 2011	Estadio Olímpico Metropolitano, San Pedro Sula, Honduras	Honduras	3–0	3–0	Friendly
9	15 August 2012	RFK Stadium, Washington, D.C., United States	Guatemala	1–0	3–3	Friendly
10	5 October 2017	Estadio Metropolitano Roberto Meléndez, Barranquilla, Colombia	Colombia	1–1	2–1	2018 FIFA World Cup qualification
11	5 June 2019	Estadio Antonio Aranda, Ciudad del Este, Paraguay	Honduras	1–0	1–1	Friendly
12	16 June 2019	Estádio do Maracanã, Rio de Janeiro, Brazil	Qatar	1–0	2–2	2019 Copa América

== Honours ==
3 de Febrero

- Paraguayan División Intermedia: 2004

Benfica

- Primeira Liga: 2009–10, 2013–14
- Taça de Portugal: 2013–14
- Taça da Liga: 2008–09, 2009–10, 2010–11, 2011–12, 2013–14
- Supertaça Cândido de Oliveira runner-up: 2010
- UEFA Europa League runner-up: 2012–13, 2013–14

Olympiacos

- Super League Greece: 2016–17

Libertad

- Paraguayan Primera División: 2021 Apertura, 2022 Apertura, 2023 Apertura, 2023 Clausura, 2024 Apertura, 2025 Apertura
- Copa Paraguay: 2019, 2023, 2024
- Supercopa Paraguay: 2023, 2024

Individual

- Paraguayan Footballer of the Year: 2006, 2009
- Primeira Liga Top scorer: 2009–10, 2011–12
- SJPF Player of the Month: May 2009, 2011–12
- Taça de Portugal Top scorer: 2007–08, 2010–11, 2012–13
- UEFA Europa League top scorer: 2009–10
- Goal.com Team of the Year: 2009–10
- Paraguayan Primera División Top scorer: 2018, 2023
- Paraguayan Primera División Best Player: 2023

== See also ==
- Players and Records in Paraguayan Football
