= Ariel Galeano =

Paraguayan football manager (born 1996)

Personal information
- Full name: Ariel Sebastián Galeano Arce
- Date of birth: 7 September 1996 (age 30)
- Place of birth: Asunción, Paraguay

Team information
- Current team: Libertad (manager)

Managerial career
- Years: Team
- 2016: Sol de América (assistant)
- 2017: Sportivo Trinidense (assistant)
- 2017: Deportivo Liberación (assistant)
- 2018–2019: River Plate Asunción (assistant)
- 2019: Fulgencio Yegros
- 2020: River Plate Asunción (assistant)
- 2020: River Plate Asunción (caretaker)
- 2021: 2 de Mayo
- 2022–2023: Libertad (youth)
- 2023–2024: Libertad
- 2024–2025: PAS Giannina
- 2025: ŁKS Łódź
- 2026: Guaraní
- 2026–: Libertad

Ariel Sebastián Galeano Arce (born 7 September 1996) is a Paraguayan professional football manager, currently in charge of Libertad.

== Career ==
Galeano worked as an assistant at Sol de América, Sportivo Trinidense, Deportivo Liberación and River Plate Asunción. On 9 June 2019, he replaced Ricardo Torressi at the helm of Fulgencio Yegros.

In September 2019, Galeano was sacked by Fulgencio, and subsequently returned to an assistant role at River Plate. On 7 December 2020, he was named caretaker manager of the latter side for the remainder of the year, replacing Carlos Aitor García.

On 6 December 2020, Galeano agreed to become the manager of 2 de Mayo for the upcoming season. He was dismissed on 26 May, after nine matches.

In January 2022, Galeano joined Libertad as a manager of the youth sides. On 21 September 2023, he became a first team manager until the end of the year, after Daniel Garnero took over the Paraguay national team.

Despite winning the 2023 Clausura and the 2024 Apertura, Galeano was sacked on 19 August 2024, after a poor run of form. On 26 October, he moved abroad for the first time in his career, after being named manager of Greek side PAS Giannina.

On 6 February 2025, Galeano was sacked despite being in the third position and having just one defeat. Nineteen days later, he was announced as new manager of Polish side ŁKS Łódź. Two months later, on 24 April, Galeano was dismissed following a five-game winless streak.

On 14 July 2026, Galeano was announced as manager of Guaraní back in his home country, but was sacked on 31 August. On 1 November, he returned to Libertad.

== Managerial statistics ==
As of match played 30 August 2026

Managerial record by team and tenure
Team	Nat	From	To	Record							
Team	Nat	From	To	G	W	D	L	GF	GA	GD	Win %
Fulgencio Yegros	(Paraguay)	9 June 2019	1 September 2019	13	1	3	9	10	27	−17	7.69
River Plate Asunción (caretaker)	(Paraguay)	8 December 2020	31 December 2020	2	0	2	0	1	1	+0	0.00
2 de Mayo	(Paraguay)	1 January 2021	26 May 2021	9	2	3	4	10	11	−1	22.22
Libertad	(Paraguay)	21 September 2023	20 August 2024	52	27	17	8	93	47	+46	51.92
PAS Giannina	(Greece)	28 October 2024	6 February 2025	12	5	6	1	17	12	+5	41.67
ŁKS Łódź	(Poland)	25 February 2025	24 April 2025	8	2	2	4	9	13	−4	25.00
Guaraní	(Paraguay)	16 July 2026	31 August 2026	8	2	3	3	8	9	−1	25.00
Total				104	39	36	29	148	120	+28	37.50

== Honours ==
Libertad

- Paraguayan Primera División: 2023 Clausura, 2024 Apertura
- Copa Paraguay: 2023
