= Luciano Theiler =

Argentinian footballer and manager (born 1981)

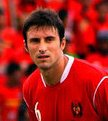
- Luciano Theiler in 2010.

Personal information
- Full name: Luciano Ariel Theiler
- Date of birth: 1 June 1981 (age 45)
- Place of birth: Justiniano Posse, Argentina
- Height: 1.82 m (6 ft 0 in)
- Position: Defender

Youth career
- Teniente Origone
- Sportivo Unión General Ordóñez
- Teniente Origone

Senior career*
| Years | Team | Apps | (Gls) |
| 1997–1998 | Renato Cesarini | | |
| 1999 | Lanús | | |
| 2000–2003 | Belgrano | 9 | (0) |
| 2004 | Alumni de Villa María | 2 | (0) |
| 2004 | General Paz Juniors | 5 | (0) |
| 2005 | Alumni de Villa María | 25 | (3) |
| 2005–2006 | Independiente de La Rioja | 22 | (1) |
| 2006 | San José | | |
| 2007 | Patronato | 13 | (0) |
| 2008 | Victory Sports Club | | |
| 2008–2009 | Al-Karamah | | |
| 2009 | Al Ahed | | |
| 2009–2010 | Persiba Bantul | | |
| 2010–2011 | Muktijoddha Sangsad | | |
| 2011–2012 | Talleres de Perico | | |

Managerial career
- 2012–2017: Sportivo Belgrano (assistant)
- 2017–2018: Instituto (assistant)
- 2018–2019: Guillermo Brown
- 2019: Independiente Rivadavia
- 2020: Alumni de Villa María
- 2020–2021: Deportivo Maipú
- 2021–2022: Sportivo Belgrano (youth)
- 2022: General Caballero JLM
- 2023: Guaireña
- 2024: Alianza Atlético
- 2025: Wilstermann
- 2025–: Maccabi Haifa (assistant manager)
- * Club domestic league appearances and goals

Luciano Theiler (born 1 June 1981) is an Argentine football assistant manager and former player who played as a defender.

== Club career ==
Theiler started his senior career with Club Atlético Belgrano in the Primera B Nacional, where he made nine league appearances and scored zero goals. After that, he played for Alumni de Villa María, General Paz Juniors, Independiente de La Rioja, Club San José, Club Atlético Patronato, Victory Sports Club, Al-Karamah SC, Al Ahed, Persiba Bantul, Muktijoddha Sangsad KC, and Talleres de Perico before retiring.
