= Fabián Ponce =

Argentine footballer and manager

Personal information
- Full name: Héctor Fabián Ponce
- Date of birth: 10 July 1971 (age 55)
- Place of birth: Corrientes, Argentina
- Position: Midfielder

Team information
- Current team: Patriotas FC (manager)

Senior career*
Years	Team	Apps	(Gls)
1993–1994	Deportivo Mandiyú		
1994–1995	Rosamonte		
1996–1997	Ferrocarril Urquiza		
- Tigre de Santo Pipó

Managerial career
- 2010–2011: Guaraní Antonio Franco (youth)
- 2011–2012: Jorge Gibson Brown (assistant)
- 2012: Deportivo Mandiyú (assistant)
- 2012–2013: Deportivo Mandiyú
- 2014–2015: Madariaga
- 2015–2016: Jorge Gibson Brown (assistant)
- 2016: Peñarol de Corrientes
- 2016–2019: Madariaga
- 2022: River Plate Asunción (assistant)
- 2023: General Caballero JLM (reserves)
- 2023: General Caballero JLM (interim)
- 2024: General Caballero JLM
- 2024–: Patriotas FC
- * Club domestic league appearances and goals

Héctor Fabián Ponce (born 10 July 1971) is an Argentine football manager and former player who played as a midfielder. He is the current manager of Paraguayan club Patriotas FC.

== Playing career ==
Born in Corrientes, Ponce notably represented Deportivo Mandiyú, Rosamonte, Ferrocarril Urquiza and Tigre de Santo Pipó.

== Managerial career ==
After retiring, Ponce worked as a fitness and youth coach for Guaraní Antonio Franco before becoming an assistant of Carlos Suirezs at Jorge Gibson Brown on 29 September 2011. On 14 August 2012, he moved to Deportivo Mandiyú under the same role.

On 5 November 2012, Ponce was named manager of Mandiyú, replacing Waldino Casco. He was sacked on 13 February of the following year, and took over Madariaga in January 2014.

On 15 May 2015, Ponce returned to Jorge Gibson Brown, again as an assistant. On 8 July 2016, after a brief period in charge of Peñarol de Corrientes, he returned to Madariaga.

On 9 August 2019, Ponce left Madariaga to work as a youth coordinator at Guaraní Antonio Franco. In 2022, he moved to Paraguay and became an assistant at River Plate Asunción.

Ponce started the 2023 season as the manager of General Caballero JLM's reserve team, but became an interim of the main squad on 13 November. On 6 December, he was confirmed as manager of the main squad for the upcoming campaign.

Ponce was sacked from General Caballero on 14 April 2024.
