= Iván Torres =

Paraguayan footballer (born 1991)

Personal information
- Full name: Iván Arturo Torres Riveros
- Date of birth: 27 February 1991 (age 35)
- Place of birth: Ñemby, Paraguay
- Height: 1.78 m (5 ft 10 in)
- Position: Left-back

Team information
- Current team: Sportivo Luqueño
- Number: 13

Senior career*
Years	Team	Apps	(Gls)
2009–2014	Cerro Porteño	81	(5)
2015–2023	Olimpia	212	(11)
2016–2017	→ Colón (loan)	26	(4)
2024	Goiás	10	(1)
2024–	Sportivo Luqueño	12	(0)

International career^{‡}
2011	Paraguay U20	4	(1)
2019–	Paraguay	1	(0)
- * Club domestic league appearances and goals as of 15 September 2024 ‡ National team caps and goals as of 5 June 2019

Iván Arturo Torres Riveros (born 27 February 1991) is a Paraguayan professional footballer who plays as a left-back for Sportivo Luqueño.

== International ==
He made his Paraguay national football team debut on 5 June 2019, in a friendly against Honduras, as a starter.

== Personal life ==
Torres married Cristina "Vita" Aranda, with whom he had three children. Aranda was shot while attending the Ja'umina Fest music festival at the Jose Asuncion Flores Amphitheatre in San Bernardino on 30 January 2022 and she later died from her injuries. Aranda was one of two people killed as a result of the shooting, and four others were injured.

== See also ==
- Players and Records in Paraguayan Football
