= Luis Fernando Escobar =

Paraguayan football manager (born 1975)

Personal information
- Full name: Luis Fernando Escobar Zelaya
- Date of birth: 25 April 1975 (age 51)
- Place of birth: Luque, Paraguay
- Position: Midfielder

Team information
- Current team: Tembetary (manager)

Youth career
- Sport Primavera
- Sportivo Luqueño

Senior career*
Years	Team	Apps	(Gls)
1994–199X	Sportivo Luqueño		
- Colegiales
1998–1999	Cerro Porteño		
- 12 de Octubre
- Sport Colombia
- Santa Lucía Cotzumalguapa
- Sportivo San Lorenzo
- Nacional Asunción

Managerial career
- 2006–2009: Salto del Guairá
- 2012: 16 de Agosto
- 2013–2014: Sportivo Ycuá Duré
- 2015–2016: Sportivo Yuquyry
- 2016: Sportivo Luqueño (youth)
- 2017–2019: General Díaz (youth)
- 2018: Tembetary
- 2019: General Díaz (interim)
- 2019: Tembetary
- 2020–2021: Sportivo Luqueño
- 2021: Deportivo Santaní
- 2023: Sportivo San Lorenzo
- 2023: 24 de Setiembre
- 2024: 12 de Octubre
- 2025: Olimpia de Itá
- 2025–: Tembetary
- * Club domestic league appearances and goals

Luis Fernando Escobar Zelaya (born 25 April 1975) is a Paraguayan football manager and former player who played as a midfielder. He is the current manager of Tembetary.

== Career ==
Born in Luque, Escobar graduated from Sportivo Luqueño. After making his first team debut in 1994, he subsequently represented Colegiales, Cerro Porteño, 12 de Octubre, Sport Colombia, Sportivo San Lorenzo, and Nacional Asunción in his home country, aside from a period in Guatemala's Santa Lucía Cotzumalguapa.

After retiring Escobar became a manager and won three regional championships in a row with Salto del Guairá. He then managed lower league sides in his native region before being named in charge of General Díaz's youth setup in 2017.

In 2018, while still working for General Díaz, Escobar led Tembetary to the Cuarta División title and subsequent promotion to the Primera División B. On 10 February 2019, he was named interim manager of General Díaz in the Primera División.

Escobar returned to the youth setup in April 2019, after the appointment of Cristian Martínez. He returned to Tembetary for the 2019 campaign, narrowly missing out on another promotion.

On 9 November 2020, Escobar returned to his first club Sportivo Luqueño, now appointed first team manager. After leaving the club the following 1 May, he was in charge of Deportivo Santaní, Sportivo San Lorenzo, 24 de Setiembre, 12 de Octubre and Olimpia de Itá before returning to Tembetary on 30 July 2025, with the club now in the top tier.

== Honours ==
Tembetary

- Paraguayan Cuarta División: 2018
