= Héctor Marecos =

Paraguayan football manager (born 1979)

Personal information
- Full name: Héctor Fernando Marecos Silvera
- Date of birth: 4 January 1979 (age 47)
- Place of birth: Lima, Paraguay
- Position: Goalkeeper

Youth career
- Capitán Bado

Senior career*
Years	Team	Apps	(Gls)
- Colegiales
- Tembetary
- Capitán Figari
- Vencedor
- 13 de Junio

Managerial career
- 2012–2013: Deportivo Capiatá (assistant)
- 2013: Deportivo Capiatá (interim)
- 2014–2015: Deportivo Capiatá
- 2015: Sportivo Iteño
- 2015: Sportivo San Lorenzo
- 2016: Sportivo Luqueño
- 2016: General Díaz
- 2017: Sportivo Luqueño
- 2017: Deportivo Capiatá
- 2017–2018: Sol de América
- 2018–2019: Deportivo Santaní
- 2019: Deportivo Capiatá
- 2020: General Díaz
- 2021: Rubio Ñu
- 2021: Independiente CG
- 2022: 12 de Octubre
- 2023: Ovetense
- 2024–2025: Rubio Ñu
- * Club domestic league appearances and goals

Héctor Fernando Marecos Silvera (born 4 January 1979) is a Paraguayan football manager and former player who played as a goalkeeper.

== Playing career ==
Born in Lima, San Pedro, Marecos played for Capitán Bado before making his debut with Colegiales in 1996. He subsequently represented Tembetary, Capitán Figari, Vencedor and 13 de Junio before playing for other amateur sides.

== Coaching career ==
After retiring, Marecos started working as Edgar Denis' assistant before taking over Deportivo Capiatá in the later stages of 2013, as an interim. Confirmed as manager for the 2014 season, he led the side to the round of 16 in the Copa Sudamericana, defeating Boca Juniors at the La Bombonera but being knocked out on penalties.

Marecos left Capiatá on 14 March 2015, and took over Sportivo Iteño on 12 May. Six days later, however, he was named in charge of Sportivo San Lorenzo, but was unable to avoid relegation.

On 11 December 2015, Marecos was named in charge of Sportivo Luqueño, but was sacked the following 27 April. He was appointed General Díaz manager on 27 May 2016, but was dismissed on 22 November.

Marecos returned to Luqueño on 20 December 2016, but was again relieved from his duties on 25 February 2017. He returned to Capiatá on 8 April, but was sacked on 9 June.

On 4 October 2017, Marecos was appointed in charge of Sol de América, being dismissed the following 1 June. On 27 August 2018, he took over Deportivo Santaní, leaving the following 17 February.

Marecos returned to Capiatá for a third spell on 25 August 2019, being sacked on 26 September. He returned to General Díaz on 11 November 2020, but again suffered relegation.

During the 2021 season, Marecos was in charge of Rubio Ñu and Independiente de Campo Grande in the second level. On 21 August 2022, he was appointed manager of 12 de Octubre in the top tier.

== Honours ==
Rubio Nu

- División Intermedia: 2025
