= Víctor Bernay =

Argentine football manager (born 1970)

Personal information
- Full name: Víctor Eduardo Ceferino Bernay
- Date of birth: 4 April 1970 (age 56)
- Place of birth: Concordia, Argentina

Team information
- Current team: Nacional Asunción (manager)

Youth career
- Victoria de Concordia
- Newell's Old Boys

Senior career*
| Years | Team | Apps | (Gls) |
- Victoria de Concordia

Managerial career
- Ferro de Concordia
- –2005: Atlético Uruguay
- 2006–2007: Gimnasia La Plata (assistant)
- 2007–2008: Independiente (assistant)
- 2008–2010: Cerro Porteño (assistant)
- 2010–2011: Argentinos Juniors (assistant)
- 2011–2016: Gimnasia La Plata (assistant)
- 2016: Tigre (assistant)
- 2017–2018: Universitario (assistant)
- 2018–2019: Gimnasia La Plata (assistant)
- 2019–2020: Cerro Porteño (youth)
- 2019: Cerro Porteño (caretaker)
- 2021: Santos (assistant)
- 2023: Cerro Porteño (caretaker)
- 2023: Cerro Porteño (caretaker)
- 2024: Cerro Porteño
- 2024–2025: Nacional Asunción
- 2025–2026: Guaraní
- 2026–: Nacional Asunción
- * Club domestic league appearances and goals

Víctor Eduardo Ceferino Bernay (Spanish pronunciation: [ˈbiɣtoɾ βeɾˈnaj]; born 4 April 1970) is an Argentine football coach, currently the manager of Paraguayan club Nacional Asunción.

== Career ==
Born in Concordia, Entre Ríos, Bernay played youth football for Club Atlético Victoria de Concordia as a youth, making his senior debut at the age of 16 while being the club's fitness coach. He later studied accounting before moving to physical education. He also had a short spell at Newell's Old Boys' youth setup, but had to leave due to military service.

Bernay began his managerial career at CA Ferrocarril de Concordia before moving to Atlético Uruguay. He left the latter club on 30 December 2005, to join Pedro Troglio's staff at Gimnasia La Plata.

Bernay continued to work with Troglio in the following seasons, being his assistant at Independiente, Cerro Porteño, Argentinos Juniors, Gimnasia (two stints), Tigre and Universitario.

In April 2019, Bernay was named Secretary of Sports of his hometown. He left the post in June to return to Cerro Porteño, being a youth football coordinator while in charge of the youth categories.

On 8 October 2019, Bernay was named first team manager in an interim manager for the remainder of the season. He returned to his previous role in December, after nine matches.

On 23 February 2021, Bernay was appointed Ariel Holan's assistant at Santos. He left with Holan in April, and returned to Cerro in January 2022, as a director of the youth sides.

Bernay became a caretaker manager of Cerro in July 2023, after the dismissal of Facundo Sava, but returned to his previous role after the appointment of Diego Gavilán. In September, he was named caretaker for the remainder of the year, after Gavilán was sacked.

On 6 December 2023, Bernay was confirmed as manager of Cerro for the 2024 season, but was sacked on 10 March. On 1 April 2024, he took over Nacional Asunción also in the Paraguayan top tier.

On 2 February 2025, Bernay resigned from Nacional. On 4 June, he was announced as manager of Guaraní, but was sacked from the latter on 16 March 2026.

On 8 April 2026, Bernay returned to Nacional.

== Managerial statistics ==
As of 23 February 2021

Managerial record by team and tenure
| Team | Nat | From | To | Record | | | | | | | | Ref |
| Team | Nat | From | To | G | W | D | L | GF | GA | GD | Win % | Ref |
|---|---|---|---|---|---|---|---|---|---|---|---|---|
| Cerro Porteño (caretaker) | (Paraguay) | 8 October 2019 | 15 December 2019 | 9 | 6 | 0 | 3 | 19 | 14 | +5 | 66.67 | |
| Total | | | | 9 | 6 | 0 | 3 | 19 | 14 | +5 | 66.67 | — |
