= Carlos Recalde =

Paraguayan footballer (born 1983)

Personal information
- Full name: Carlos Ariel Recalde González
- Date of birth: 14 December 1983 (age 42)
- Place of birth: Ñemby, Paraguay
- Height: 1.77 m (5 ft 10 in)
- Position: Left winger

Team information
- Current team: Resistencia (manager)

Youth career
- Sol de América

Senior career*
| Years | Team | Apps | (Gls) |
| 2004 | Sol de América | 14 | (3) |
| 2005–2007 | Guaraní | 69 | (13) |
| 2008 | San Martín (SJ) | 15 | (1) |
| 2008–2011 | Argentinos Juniors | 17 | (3) |
| 2009–2010 | → Cerro Porteño (loan) | 26 | (2) |
| 2011–2012 | Independiente Rivadavia | 14 | (1) |
| 2012–2013 | Sol de América | 10 | (0) |
| 2013 | Olimpo | 8 | (2) |
| 2013 | Sportivo Carapeguá | 10 | (0) |
| 2014 | Manta | 8 | (0) |
| 2014 | 12 de Octubre | 3 | (0) |
| 2015 | Fernando de la Mora | | |
| 2015 | General Caballero | | |
| 2016 | Olimpia de Itá | | |
| 2016 | Martín Ledesma | | |
| 2016 | Caacupé FBC | | |

Managerial career
- 2019: Deportivo Capiatá (reserves)
- 2019: Deportivo Capiatá
- 2020–2021: Resistencia
- 2021: Deportivo Capiatá
- 2022: Deportivo Santaní
- 2023–: Resistencia
- * Club domestic league appearances and goals

Carlos Ariel Recalde González (born 14 December 1983), is a Paraguayan football manager and former player who played as a left winger. He is the current manager of Resistencia.

Recalde previously played for Sol de América and Guaraní of the Paraguayan league where he scored 16 goals in 82 games. He is the father of fellow footballer José Recalde.
