= Troadio Duarte =

Paraguayan footballer (born 1977)

Personal information
- Full name: Troadio Daniel Duarte Barreto
- Date of birth: 3 April 1977 (age 49)
- Place of birth: Villarrica, Paraguay
- Height: 1.79 m (5 ft 10 in)
- Position: Midfielder

Senior career*
Years	Team	Apps	(Gls)
1996–1997	Olimpia		
1998–1999	Guaraní		
2000–2002	Sol de América	38	(2)
2002	Sportivo San Lorenzo	14	(0)
2003	Sportivo Luqueño	25	(0)
2004–2007	Nacional Asunción	123	(8)
2007	Barcelona SC	18	(1)
2008–2009	3 de Febrero		
2008	Macará	13	(0)
2009	3 de Febrero		
2009	Total Chalaco	9	(0)
2010	Sport Huancayo	18	(0)
2011	3 de Febrero		

Managerial career
- 2017: Guaireña
- 2018–2022: Guaireña
- 2023: General Caballero JLM
- 2024: Guaireña
- 2024: Sol de América
- 2025: General Caballero JLM
- 2025: Guaireña
- 2026: Deportivo Capiatá
- 2026: Sportivo San Lorenzo
- * Club domestic league appearances and goals

Troadio Daniel Duarte Barreto (born 3 April 1977) is a Paraguayan football manager and former player who played as a midfielder.
