= Roberto Torres (footballer, born 1972) =

Paraguayan footballer and manager

Personal information
- Full name: Roberto Ismael Torres Báez
- Date of birth: 6 April 1972 (age 54)
- Place of birth: Asunción, Paraguay
- Height: 1.73 m (5 ft 8 in)
- Position: Midfielder

Team information
- Current team: Guaraní de Fram (manager)

Youth career
- Cerro Porteño

Senior career*
Years	Team	Apps	(Gls)
1990–1998	Cerro Porteño		
1999	O'Higgins	5	(0)
1999–2000	Júbilo Iwata		
2001–2002	Sportivo Luqueño		
2003–2005	Sportivo San Lorenzo		

International career
1996	Paraguay	1	(0)

Managerial career
- 2013: Cerro Porteño (caretaker)
- 2014: Cerro Porteño (caretaker)
- 2015: Cerro Porteño
- 2016: Libertad
- 2017: Nacional Asunción
- 2019: Sportivo Luqueño
- 2020: Nacional Asunción
- 2020–2021: Sportivo San Lorenzo
- 2022: Resistencia
- 2023: Guaireña
- 2024: Sol de América
- 2025: Boyacá Chicó
- 2025–: Guaraní de Fram
- * Club domestic league appearances and goals

Roberto Ismael Torres Báez (born 6 April 1972) is a Paraguayan football manager and former player who played as a midfielder. He is currently in charge of Guaraní de Fram.

Torres has played for the Paraguay national team.

== Playing career ==
Torres played for Cerro Porteño, Sportivo Luqueño and Sportivo San Lorenzo in his homeland. Abroad, he has stints with Chilean club O'Higgins and the Japanese club Júbilo Iwata.

== Coaching career ==
Torres began his coaching career as an interim manager for Cerro Porteño for two matches in 2013. In 2015 he became permanent manager, winning the 2015 Apertura and ending as runner-up in the Clausura tournament that same year. Torres left the club immediately afterwards and took over Libertad, winning the 2016 Apertura with the Gumarelo side. On 19 February 2019, Torres was appointed as manager of Sportivo Luqueño. Aside from Cerro Porteño, Libertad, and Sportivo Luqueño, Torres also coached Paraguayan clubs Nacional, San Lorenzo, Resistencia, Guaireña, and Sol de América. On 23 February 2025, he was announced as the new manager of Colombian club Boyacá Chicó, where he worked for two months until resigning on 21 April after going winless in 10 matches.

In July 2025, he was appointed as the manager of Guaraní de Fram.

== Career statistics ==
=== Club ===
Club performance			League		Cup		League Cup		Total	
Season	Club	League	Apps	Goals	Apps	Goals	Apps	Goals	Apps	Goals
Japan			League		Emperor's Cup		J.League Cup		Total	
1999	Júbilo Iwata	J1 League	1	0	0	0	0	0	1	0
2000	Júbilo Iwata	J1 League	0	0	0	0	0	0	0	0
Total			1	0	0	0	0	0	1	0

=== International ===
Paraguay national team
Year	Apps	Goals
1996	1	0
Total	1	0
