= Diego Gavilán =

Paraguayan footballer and coach (born 1980)

Personal information
- Full name: Diego Antonio Gavilán Zarate
- Date of birth: 1 March 1980 (age 46)
- Place of birth: Asunción, Paraguay
- Height: 1.76 m (5 ft 9 in)
- Position: Defensive midfielder

Youth career
- 1996–1998: Cerro Porteño

Senior career*
Years	Team	Apps	(Gls)
1998–1999	Cerro Porteño	24	(7)
2000–2003	Newcastle United	7	(1)
2002–2003	→ UAG (loan)	14	(1)
2003	→ Internacional (loan)	39	(5)
2003–2004	→ Udinese (loan)	15	(0)
2004–2005	Internacional	57	(2)
2005–2007	Newell's Old Boys	26	(1)
2007	Grêmio	17	(0)
2008	Flamengo	4	(9)
2008	Portuguesa	22	(6)
2009	Independiente	5	(4)
2010	Olimpia	2	(0)
2011	Juan Aurich	4	(0)
2011	Independiente FBC	0	(4)
Total		221	(55)

International career
1999–2006	Paraguay	43	(7)

Managerial career
- 2013: Cerro Porteño U15
- 2014: Olimpia de Itá
- 2015: Sport Colombia
- 2015: Independiente FBC
- 2016: Olimpia de Itá
- 2017: Deportivo Capiatá
- 2017: Sportivo Trinidense
- 2017: Sol de América
- 2018: Deportivo Capiatá
- 2018–2019: Pelotas
- 2021–2023: Cerro Porteño (reserves)
- 2023: Cerro Porteño
- * Club domestic league appearances and goals

Diego Antonio Gavilán Zarate (born 1 March 1980) is a Paraguayan former footballer and current coach.

== Career ==
Gavilán's nickname pampero – literally meaning the horse or the man that runs like the wind in the Pampa – offers a fair indication of his purposeful and hard-running style. He began his top-flight career at Cerro Porteño and he became the first-ever Paraguayan to play in England, when he signed for Newcastle United in 2000.

=== Newcastle United ===
Gavilan signed with the club in January 2000. On the eve of playing the 2000 Pre-Olympic CONMEBOL Tournament, was surprised by being transferred to Newcastle United, attending a meeting on one and then signing a contract the next day. Gavilán did not participate in the Pre-Olympic Tournament and went directly to his new club. Upon joining from Cerro Porteño, Gavilan was labelled Paraguay's David Beckham. Gavilán already studied English whilst in High School in Paraguay, but had to take classes twice a week once he was in Newcastle to improve his English.

Gavilán cost Newcastle £2m when he left his native Paraguay behind at the age of just 19. He made his Premiership debut in a 2–2 draw at Sunderland. He struggled however, to stake a real claim for a first team place, making some appearances for the club as a substitute. He scored once in the league, against Coventry in a 2–0 win in April 2000.

Gavilan mentioned the difference between English and Paraguayan football and the physicality in the Premier League, that he was tackled hardly by Jaap Stam in his first game against Manchester United.

In December 2001, it was announced that Newcastle would loan out Gavilan to Mexican club Universidad Autonoma de Guadalajara for the remainder of the 2001/02 season. His last first-team appearance fifteen months prior to this was in a League Cup victory over Leyton Orient, and by this time he had played only two further games for the club.

In 2003, he joined Internacional of Brazil.

Gavilan later revealed that Gary Speed was like a father to him, praising Speed for helping him settle into life at St. James' Park and for also congratulating Gavilan when he was selected for Paraguay's squad for the 2002 FIFA World Cup.

=== Newell's Old Boys ===
In 2006, Gavilán signed with the Argentinian side Newell's Old Boys.

=== Gremio ===
He signed the following year with Grêmio, returning to the city of Porto Alegre in Brazil.

=== Independiente ===
Gavilán then joined Independiente on loan.

=== Portuguesa ===
Then with Portuguesa until November.

=== Independiente CG ===
In 2011, the players signs with Independiente CG.

== Coaching career ==
Gavilán coached Cerro Porteño U15 as of 2013. He coached Sergio Díaz.

In May 2015, Gavilán was announced as coach of Independiente Campo Grande in Paraguay's Division Intermedia, second division.

In July 2023, he was announced as coach of Cerro Porteño Paraguay's Primera Division, the top-tier division of the country.
