= Mario Jara =

Argentine football manager

Personal information
- Full name: Mario Vicente Jara
- Date of birth: 25 April 1970 (age 56)
- Place of birth: Formosa, Argentina
- Height: 1.77 m (5 ft 10 in)
- Position: Midfielder

Youth career
- Argentinos Juniors

Senior career*
Years	Team	Apps	(Gls)
2002–2003	Juventud Unida	21	(2)
2003–2004	Leandro N. Alem	27	(7)
2004–2005	Flandria	13	(1)
2006–2008	2 de Mayo		
2009	Olimpia	14	(0)
2010	General Díaz		
2010	Sportivo Patria	7	(1)
2011	Santo André		
2012	Osvaldo Cruz	2	(0)
2012	Lagarto	0	(0)
2012	América-PE		
2012	Barracas Central		
2013	El Porvenir	3	(0)

Managerial career
- 2015: General Díaz
- 2015: Deportivo Santaní
- 2016: Rubio Ñu
- 2016: Sportivo Luqueño
- 2017: 22 de Setiembre
- 2017: General Díaz
- 2018: Deportivo Santaní
- 2018–2019: Independiente CG
- 2019: Deportivo Capiatá
- 2019: Deportivo Santaní
- 2020: 12 de Octubre
- 2021: River Plate Asunción
- 2022: 2 de Mayo
- 2022: Resistencia
- * Club domestic league appearances and goals

Mario Vicente Jara (born 25 April 1980) is an Argentine football manager and former player who played as a midfielder.

== Playing career ==
Born in Formosa, Jara made his senior debut in 2002 with Juventud Unida. In 2006, after representing local sides Leandro N. Alem and Flandria, he moved to Paraguay with 2 de Mayo.

In 2009, Jara joined Olimpia, but featured sparingly. In January 2010, he agreed to a move to Sportivo Luqueño, but did not sign for the club after failing a medical,

On 9 December 2010, Jara moved to Brazil and signed for Santo André for the 2011 campaign. For the 2012 season, he represented Brazilian sides Osvaldo Cruz, Lagarto before returning to his home country with Barracas Central.

In 2013, after playing for El Porvenir, Jara retired.

== Managerial career ==
In April 2015, Jara was named manager of former club General Díaz. He resigned in August, and took over fellow league team Deportivo Santaní in September.

On 17 December 2015, Jara was appointed Rubio Ñu manager for the 2016 campaign, but resigned the following 2 October. Fourteen days after leaving Rubio Ñu, he took over another former club, Sportivo Luqueño, leaving the latter at the end of the season.

In April 2017, Jara took over División Intermedia side 22 de Septiembre before returning to General Díaz in October. On 6 December, after receiving public criticism from the club's president, he resigned.

Jara returned to Santaní on 15 March 2018, but was sacked on 26 August. On 4 November, he was appointed at the helm of Independiente de Campo Grande.

In May 2019, Jara left Independiente to take over Deportivo Capiatá. Sacked on 25 August, he returned to Santaní for a third spell on 2 September.

Jara resigned on 28 October 2019, only returning to club duties the following 21 February with 12 de Octubre. He was sacked by the latter on 13 November 2020, being later appointed manager of River Plate Asunción on 21 December.

On 9 March 2021, Jara resigned. During the 2022 season, he was in charge of 2 de Mayo in the second division, and later Resistencia in the top tier.
