= Cristian Martínez (Paraguayan footballer) =

Paraguayan footballer (born 1983)

Personal information
- Full name: Cristian Martínez Medina
- Date of birth: 19 May 1983 (age 43)
- Place of birth: Ayolas, Paraguay
- Height: 1.78 m (5 ft 10 in)
- Position: Midfielder

Youth career
- 2006–2009: Club Olimpia
- 2009: Sportivo Luqueño

Senior career*
Years	Team	Apps	(Gls)
2009–2010	3 de Febrero	12	(2)
2010–2011	Sportivo Luqueño	2	(0)
2011–2012	3 de Febrero	8	(1)
2012–2013	Sportivo Carapeguá	46	(1)
2013–2015	General Díaz	45	(4)
2015	Sol de América	11	(0)
2015–2017	Deportivo Capiatá	78	(1)
2017–2018	General Díaz	46	(0)

Managerial career
- 2019–2020: General Díaz
- 2020: San Lorenzo
- * Club domestic league appearances and goals as of 19:48, 2 October 2021 (UTC)

Cristian Martínez Medina (born 19 May 1983) is a Paraguayan professional football manager and former player.

== Career ==
Martínez spent his entire footballing career in the Paraguayan Primera División. He played for 3 de Febrero, Sportivo Luqueño, Sportivo Carapeguá, General Díaz, and Deportivo Capiatá. In 2018, he retired from football due to a health problem, and promptly managed the reserves of General Díaz. In April 2019, he was appointed the manager at General Díaz. He had a short stint as the manager San Lorenzo in 2020.
