= Carlos Aitor García =

Spanish football manager

Aitor García
Personal information
- Full name: Carlos Aitor García Sanz
- Date of birth: 14 February 1984 (age 42)
- Place of birth: Madrid, Spain

Team information
- Current team: Olimpia

Managerial career
- Years: Team
- 2005–2014: Santa Ana (youth)
- 2014: Santa Ana
- 2014–2015: Montego Bay United
- 2016: Olimpia (assistant)
- 2016–2017: Libertad (assistant)
- 2018–2019: Cerro Porteño (assistant)
- 2020: River Plate Asunción
- 2021: Guaraní (reserves)
- 2022–: Olimpia (reserves)
- 2023: Olimpia (interim)

Carlos Aitor García Sanz (born 14 February 1984) is a Spanish football manager. He is the current interim manager of Paraguayan club Olimpia's team.

== Career ==
Born in Madrid, García worked for DAV Santa Ana's youth setup and was also in the psychology department of Atlético Madrid during the 2009–10 season. He was also a coach in the Complutense University of Madrid between 2008 and 2011.

In May 2014, García was named first team manager at Santa Ana with five rounds to the end of the season, but failed to avoid relegation from the Preferente de Aficionados. On 30 July, he moved to Jamaica and was appointed manager of Montego Bay United FC, also working for the Jamaica national team as an analyst.

In February 2016, García moved to Paraguay and joined Olimpia as compatriot Fernando Jubero's assistant manager. He continued to work in the country and with Jubero in the following years, at Libertad and Cerro Porteño.

On 27 October 2020, García replaced Celso Ayala at the helm of River Plate Asunción. He was dismissed on 7 December, after only seven matches.

García then worked as an under-23 manager at Guaraní and Olimpia, being later appointed sporting director of the latter in June 2022. On 6 March 2023, he was named interim manager of Olimpia, after Julio César Cáceres was sacked.
