= Pedro Sarabia =

Paraguayan football manager (born 1975)

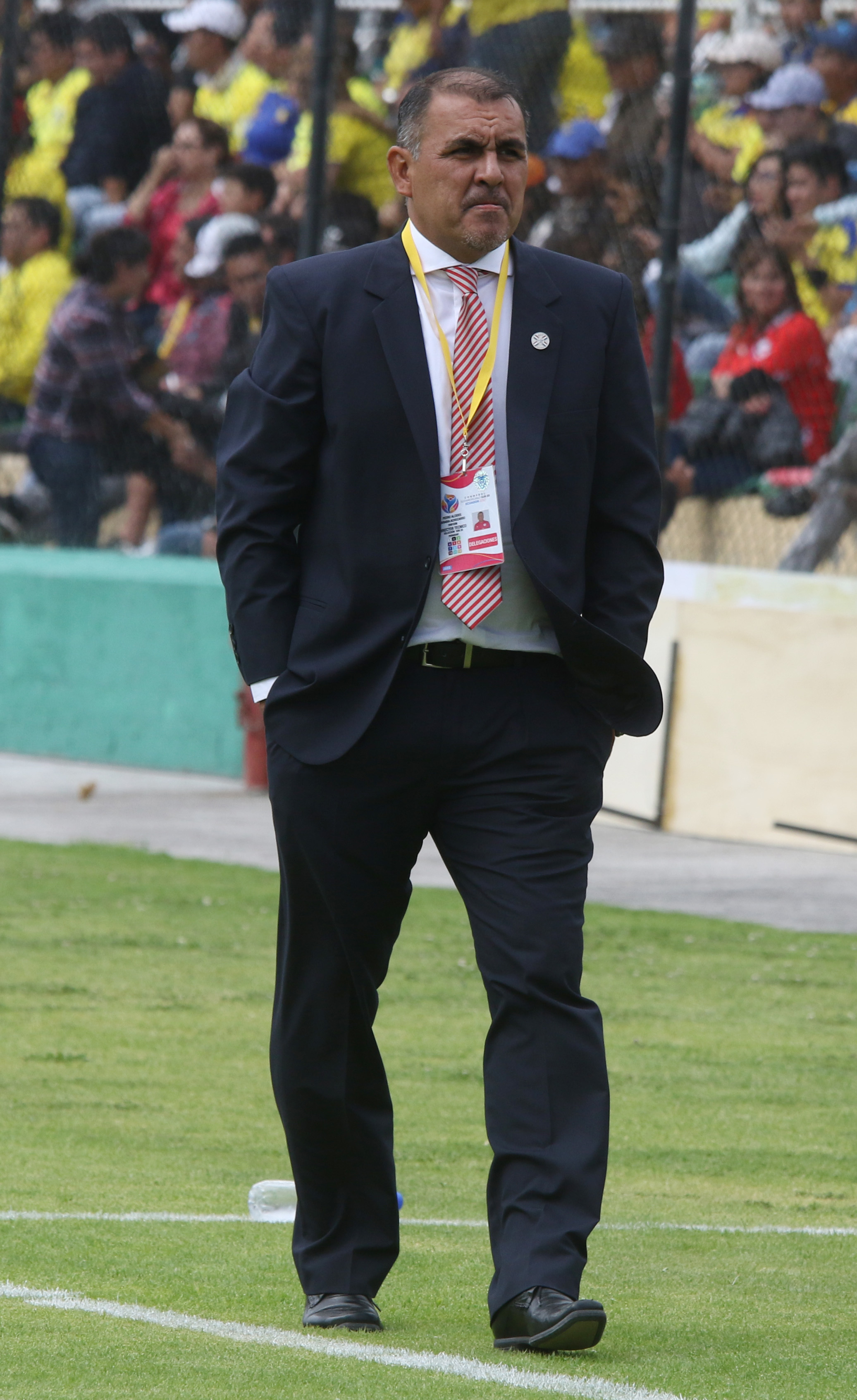
- Sarabia as a coach of Paraguay U20 in 2017

Personal information
- Full name: Pedro Alcides Sarabia Achucarro
- Date of birth: 5 July 1975 (age 51)
- Place of birth: Asunción, Paraguay
- Height: 1.83 m (6 ft 0 in)
- Position: Defender

Senior career*
Years	Team	Apps	(Gls)
1994–1996	Cerro Porteño	6	(0)
1996–1997	Banfield	28	(1)
1997–2002	River Plate	83	(0)
2002–2003	Jaguares	33	(0)
2003	Libertad	12	(1)
2004–2005	Cerro Porteño	63	(0)
2005–2012	Libertad	148	(0)

International career
1995–2006	Paraguay	47	(0)

Managerial career
- 2013–2015: Libertad
- 2016–2017: Paraguay U20
- 2017–2018: Deportivo Santaní
- 2018–2019: Sportivo Luqueño
- 2020: Paraguay U20
- 2020–2022: 12 de Octubre
- 2022–2023: Nacional Asunción
- 2024: Sportivo Ameliano
- 2025: Nacional Asunción
- 2026: Sportivo Luqueño
- * Club domestic league appearances and goals

Pedro Alcides Sarabia Achucarro (born 5 July 1975) is a Paraguayan football manager and former player who played as a defender.

At club level, Sarabia played for Cerro Porteño and Club Libertad in his home country, as well as Banfield and River Plate in Argentina, and Jaguares de Chiapas in Mexico.

== Career ==
Sarabia made his debut for the Paraguay national team in 1995, and has got 47 caps. He represented Paraguay at the World Cups in 1998 and 2002.

Sarabia retired from active professional football on 7 July 2012 playing for Libertad against Rubio Ñú (1-0) in the last game of the Apertura 2012 tournament. He was substituted on the 26th minute of the second half.
