= Guaireña F.C. =

Paraguayan professional football club

Guaireña
- Full name: Guaireña Fútbol Club
- Nicknames: El Albiceleste; El Más Grande del Interior; Gua'i
- Founded: 28 March 2016; 9 years ago
- Ground: Estadio Parque del Guairá
- Capacity: 12,000
- Coordinates: 25.76350°S 56.43949°W
- Chairman: Nery Casco
- Manager: Rolando Chilavert
- League: División Intermedia
- 2025: División Intermedia, 7th of 16
Home colours	Third colours

Guaireña Fútbol Club is a Paraguayan professional football club based in Villarrica, competing in the Paraguayan División Intermedia, having been relegated from the Primera División at the end of the 2023 season.

== History ==
The club was founded in 2016, based on the team representing the Liga Guaireña de Fútbol, which was founded in 1916 and was five-time winner of the Campeonato Nacional de Interligas, third tier competition for regional leagues affiliated to the Unión del Fútbol del Interior (UFI). With the title won in the 2015–16 season, it earned the right to compete in the División Intermedia for the 2017 season, however, in order to take part in competitions overseen by the Paraguayan Football Association such as the División Intermedia, teams promoted from the Campeonato Nacional de Interligas have to be refounded as clubs, causing the Liga Guaireña team to be refounded as Guaireña Fútbol Club.

They won their first official game in the División Intermedia in 2017, defeating River Plate 1–0 at home.

They became champions of the Paraguayan División Intermedia in 2019, earning promotion to the Primera División. For their inaugural top flight campaign, the club hired Mario Jacquet as manager. However, Jacquet stepped down a few days ahead of the start of the season, prompting previous manager Troadio Duarte to retake the helm of the club.

Their first season in the Primera División was successful, as the club managed to avoid relegation and at the same time made it to the play-offs of the Torneo Clausura, ending in sixth place of the aggregate table and qualifying for the 2021 Copa Sudamericana, where they were knocked out by River Plate in the first stage.

== Stadium ==
Guaireña play their home games at the Parque del Guairá stadium, which has a capacity of 12,000 spectators.

== Titles and International Appearances ==
- División Intermedia: 1

2019

- Copa Sudamericana: 2 appearances

2021: First stage
2022: Group stage
