= 2013 APF División Intermedia =

Second Division
- Season: 2013
- Matches: 240

The 2013 División Intermedia season was the 17th season of semi-professional football in Paraguay (second division), organized by the Paraguayan Football Association.

It will start on March 30 and will end in October.

== Promotion and Relegation ==
=== Left the division ===
Pos	To Paraguayan Primera División
1º	General Díaz (Luque)
2º	Deportivo Capiatá

Pos	To Paraguayan Primera División B
14º	Atlético Colegiales (Lambaré)
15º	Sportivo Iteño (Itá)
16º	29 de Setiembre (Luque)

=== News clubs in the division ===
Pos	From First Division
11º	Tacuary
12º	Independiente

Pos	From Third Division (country)
1º	Caacupé FBC

Pos	From Metropolitan Third Division
1º	12 de Octubre
2°	Club General Martín Ledesma (repechage winner)

== Teams ==
Team	Home City	Stadium	Capacity
12 de Octubre Football Club	Itauguá	Estadio Juan Canuto Pettengill	8.000
2 de Mayo	Pedro Juan Caballero	Río Parapití	25,000
3 de Febrero	Ciudad del Este	A. Oddone Sarubbi	28,000
Caacupé FBC	Caacupé	Estadio Tte. Fariña	
General Martín Ledesma	Capiatá	Estadio Enrique Soler	5.000
Deportivo Santaní	San Estanislao	Juan José Vázquez	4,000
Fernando de la Mora	Asunción	Emiliano Ghezzi	7,000
General Caballero	Asunción	Hugo Bogado Vaceque	5,000
Independiente	Asunción	Estadio Ricardo Gregor	1.500
Resistencia	Asunción	Tomás Beygon Gorea	3,500
River Plate	Asunción	River Plate	5,000
San Lorenzo	San Lorenzo	Ciudad Universitaria	4,000
Sport Colombia	Fernando de la Mora	Alfonso Colmán	7,000
Tacuary	Asunción	Estadio Roberto Béttega	7.000
Sportivo Trinidense	Asunción	Martín Torres	3,000
Paranaense F.C.	Ciudad del Este	A. Oddone Sarubbi	28,000

== Standings ==
Pos	Team	Pld	W	D	L	GF	GA	GD	Pts	Promotion or relegation
1	3 de Febrero	30	12	16	2	43	29	+14	52	Promoted to 2014 Paraguayan Primera División season
2	12 de Octubre	30	14	9	7	45	28	+17	51	Promoted to 2014 Paraguayan Primera División season
3	Sportivo Trinidense	30	14	7	9	30	21	+9	49	
4	Tacuary	30	13	9	8	37	23	+14	48	
5	Sport Colombia	30	12	11	7	36	28	+8	47	
6	Independiente	30	12	11	7	34	32	+2	47	
7	Paranaense	30	10	10	10	34	38	−4	40	
8	General Caballero	30	10	9	11	30	32	−2	39	
9	Caacupé FBC	30	9	11	10	29	32	−3	38	
10	Fernando de la Mora	30	9	9	12	31	33	−2	36	Relegated
11	Resistencia	30	8	11	11	37	37	0	35	
12	Deportivo Santaní	30	8	10	12	39	40	−1	34	
13	River Plate	30	6	15	9	31	40	−9	33	
14	San Lorenzo	30	6	12	12	29	35	−6	30	
15	General Martín Ledesma	30	7	9	14	31	53	−22	30	Relegated
16	2 de Mayo	30	5	11	14	24	39	−15	26	Relegated

== Relegation ==
Relegations is determined at the end of the season by computing an average (Spanish: promedio) of the number of points earned per game over the past three seasons. The three teams with the lowest average is relegated.

Pos	Team	Avg	Total Pts	Total Pld	2011	2012	2013
1st	Deportivo Santaní	1,750	98	56	44	54	0
2nd	River Plate	1,393	78	56	37	41	0
3rd	3 de Febrero	1,367	42	30	-	42	0
3rd	General Caballero	1,367	42	30	-	42	0
5th	San Lorenzo	1,357	76	56	28	48	0
6th	Sportivo Trinidense	1,339	75	56	29	46	0
7th	2 de Mayo	1,333	40	30	-	40	0
7th	Resistencia	1,333	40	30	-	40	0
9th	Sport Colombia	1,285	72	56	28	44	0
10t	Fernando de la Mora	1,250	70	56	34	36	0
11th	Paranaense	1,133	34	30	-	34	0
12th	12 de Octubre	0	0	0	-	-	0
12th	Caacupé FBC	0	0	0	-	-	0
12th	Martín Ledesma	0	0	0	-	-	0
12th	Tacuary	0	0	0	-	-	0
12th	Independiente	0	0	0	-	-	0

Relegated

- Pos: Position, Avg: Average, Total Pts: Total Points, Total Pld: Total Played

== See also ==
- Asociación Paraguaya de Fútbol
