= Antonio Bareiro =

Paraguayan footballer (born 1989)

Personal information
- Full name: Antonio Bareiro Álvarez
- Date of birth: 24 April 1989 (age 37)
- Place of birth: Caazapá, Paraguay
- Height: 1.68 m (5 ft 6 in)
- Positions: Winger; forward

Team information
- Current team: Libertad
- Number: 20

Senior career*
Years	Team	Apps	(Gls)
2009–2010	General Díaz		
2010–2011	Trinidense	18	(4)
2011–2014	General Díaz	32	(9)
2011–2012	→ Rubio Ñu (loan)	8	(0)
2014–	Libertad	149	(39)

International career^{‡}
2017–	Paraguay	7	(1)
- * Club domestic league appearances and goals as of 5:47, 18 June 2018 (UTC) ‡ National team caps and goals as of 16:47, 27 January 2022 (UTC)

Antonio Bareiro Álvarez (born 24 April 1989) is a Paraguayan professional footballer who plays as a winger and forward for Paraguayan side Club Libertad.

== Career ==
Bareiro was promoted to the Club General Díaz first team in the fall of 2009. He was transferred to Sportivo Trinidense in early 2010, but returned to General Díaz 12 months later. He was quickly loaned out to Club Rubio Ñu, where he immediately earned a spot in the starting lineup. He returned to General Díaz in 2013, scoring the game-winning goal in the 77th minute in his first game back, a league match against Deportivo Capiatá in February. He finished the 2013 Clausura season as the 9th leading goalscorer, with 6.

Bareiro was signed to Club Libertad on a four-year contract in January 2014. He made his team debut on 14 February against Club Guaraní as a part of the starting XI. Libertad won both the Apertura and Clausura tournaments in 2014.

== Career statistics ==
Scores and results list Paraguay's goal tally first.

No	Date	Venue	Opponent	Score	Result	Competition
1.	1 July 2017	CenturyLink Field, Seattle, United States	Mexico	1–2	1–2	Friendly

== Honours ==
Club Libertad

- Paraguayan Primera División: 2014 Apertura, 2014 Clausura, 2016 Apertura

Club General Díaz

- Paraguayan División Intermedia: 2012
