= List of football stadiums in Paraguay =

The following is a list of football stadiums in Paraguay, ordered by capacity.

== Current stadiums ==
#	Image	Stadium	Capacity	City	Home team
1		Estadio General Pablo Rojas	45,000	Asunción	Cerro Porteño
2		Estadio Defensores del Chaco	42,354	Asunción	Paraguay
3		Estadio Osvaldo Domínguez Dibb	32,000	Asunción	Olimpia Asunción
4		Estadio Antonio Aranda	28,000	Ciudad del Este	Club Atlético 3 de Febrero
5		Monumental Río Parapití	25,000	Pedro Juan Caballero	Club 2 de Mayo
6		Estadio Feliciano Cáceres	24,000	Luque	Sportivo Luqueño
7		Estadio Villa Alegre	16,000	Encarnación	Encarnación F.C.
8		Estadio Agustín Báez	15,000	Atyrá	Club 4 de Octubre
9		Estadio Roberto Bettega	15,000	Asunción	Tacuary
10		Estadio Tigo La Huerta	15,000	Asunción	Club Libertad
11		Estadio Luis Alfonso Giagni	11,000	Villa Elisa	Club Sol de América
12		Estadio Luis Alberto Salinas Tanasio	10,000	Itauguá	Club 12 de Octubre

== See also ==
- Football in Paraguay
- List of stadiums in Paraguay
- List of South American stadiums by capacity
- List of association football stadiums by capacity
- Lists of stadiums
