= Fabián Balbuena =

Paraguayan footballer (born 1991)

- Balbuena with Paraguay in 2026

Personal information
- Full name: Fabián Cornelio Balbuena González
- Date of birth: 23 August 1991 (age 35)
- Place of birth: Ciudad del Este, Paraguay
- Height: 1.88 m (6 ft 2 in)
- Position: Centre-back

Team information
- Current team: Grêmio
- Number: 2

Youth career
- Cerro Porteño PF

Senior career*
Years	Team	Apps	(Gls)
2010–2012	Cerro Porteño PF	76	(5)
2013	Rubio Ñu	17	(1)
2013–2014	Nacional	30	(1)
2014–2016	Libertad	43	(3)
2016–2018	Corinthians	105	(9)
2018–2021	West Ham United	54	(3)
2021–2025	Dynamo Moscow	71	(7)
2022–2023	→ Corinthians (loan)	20	(3)
2025–	Grêmio	13	(1)

International career^{‡}
2015–	Paraguay	49	(2)
2024	Paraguay Olympic (O.P.)	3	(0)
- * Club domestic league appearances and goals as of 10 May 2026 ‡ National team caps and goals as of 30 June 2026

Fabián Cornelio Balbuena González (born 23 August 1991) is a Paraguayan professional footballer who plays as a centre-back for Campeonato Brasileiro Série A club Grêmio and the Paraguay national team.

He played for Cerro Porteño PF, Rubio Ñu, Nacional and Libertad in the Paraguayan Primera División, before joining Corinthians of Brazil in 2016. He played 120 games for Corinthians, winning the Campeonato Paulista twice and the Campeonato Brasileiro Série A once, and was named in the latter's 2017 team of the year. After three years with West Ham United in the Premier League, he signed for Dynamo Moscow.

Balbuena made his senior international debut for Paraguay in 2015. He played for his national team at four Copa América tournaments, coming fourth in 2015, as well as the 2026 FIFA World Cup.

== Club career ==
=== Paraguay ===
Born in Ciudad del Este, Balbuena was promoted to Cerro Porteño PF's first team in 2010, after the arrival of new manager Eduardo Rivera. He immediately became a starter under Rivera, playing in all the remaining seven matches of the campaign as his side achieved a mid-table position.

Balbuena became a regular starter in 2011, being also team captain as the club achieved promotion from División intermedia. Balbuena joined Rubio Ñu ahead of the 2013 season, but remained at the club for only six months before moving to defending champions Club Nacional. At the latter side, he was also first-choice and reached the 2014 Copa Libertadores Finals, losing it to San Lorenzo.

On 15 August 2014, Libertad bought 50% of Balbuena's federative rights, and the player signed a four-year deal with the club. They won the 2014 Clausura tournament.

=== Corinthians ===
On 16 February 2016, Balbuena moved abroad for the first time in his career after agreeing to a three-year deal with Série A side Corinthians. He made his debut for the club nine days later by starting in a 1–1 Campeonato Paulista away draw against São Bento, and scored his first goal on 19 March in a 4–0 home routing of Linense for the same competition.

A key defensive unit at Timão, Balbuena lifted the 2017 Campeonato Paulista, 2017 Campeonato Brasileiro Série A and 2018 Campeonato Paulista during his spell. On 24 April 2018, he signed a new four-year contract.

=== West Ham United ===
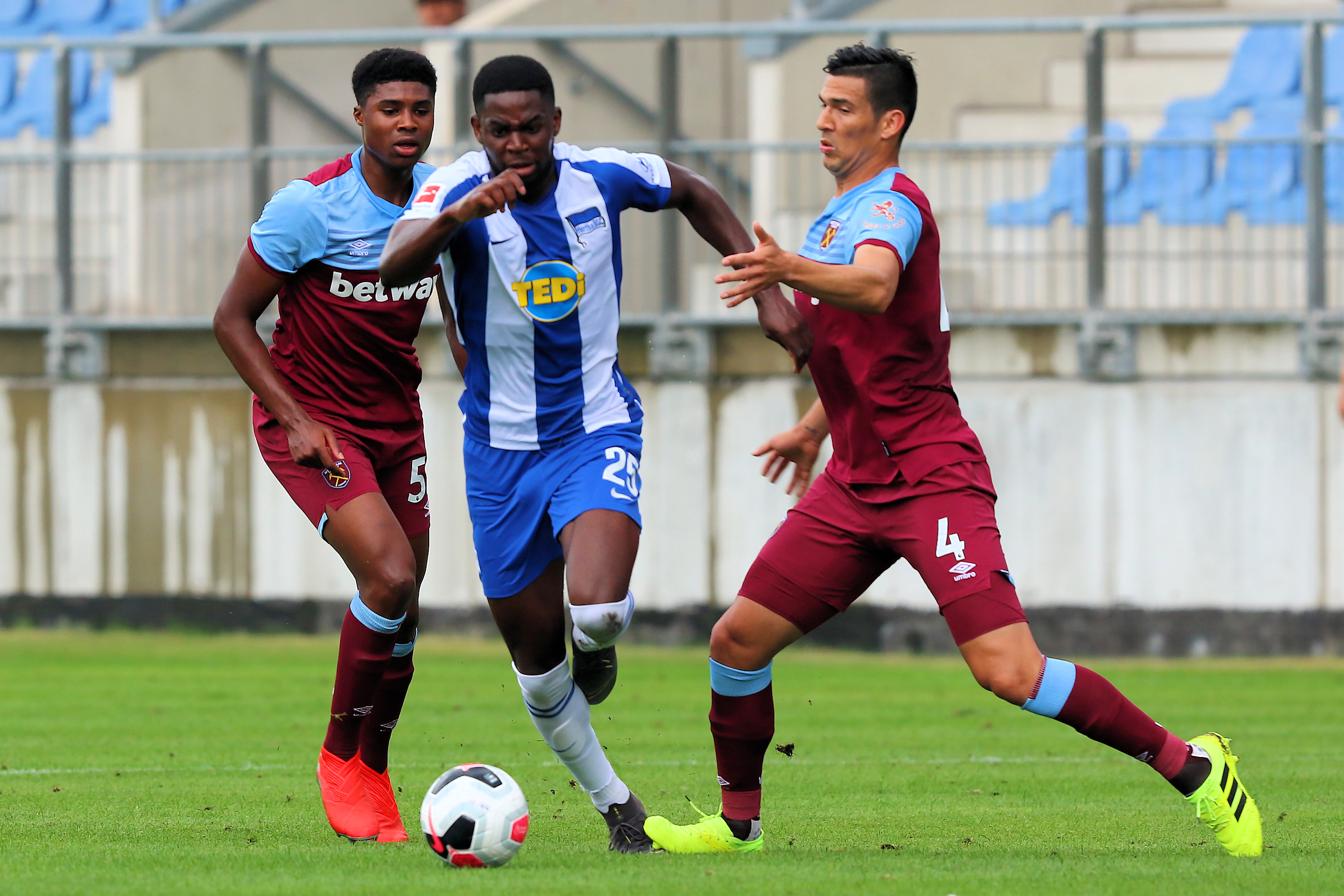
Balbuena (furthest right) in a friendly against Hertha BSC in July 2019

On 14 July 2018, Balbuena signed for Premier League club West Ham United on a three-year deal, for an undisclosed fee. He made his debut on 12 August in a 4–0 defeat by Liverpool. On 27 October he scored his first goal for the Hammers to open the scoring at Leicester City, but deflected Wilfred Ndidi's long-range shot into his own net for the equaliser; he was the first Paraguayan to score in England's top division since Antolín Alcaraz in May 2012.

On 18 October 2020, Balbuena scored West Ham's first goal as they overturned a 3–0 deficit with eight minutes remaining to draw at London rivals Tottenham Hotspur. The following 24 April, he was sent off in a 1–0 home loss to another capital team, Chelsea, for catching Ben Chilwell when making a clearance; the decision was criticised by manager David Moyes and various pundits. The red card was overturned after West Ham appealed. In May 2021, Balbuena was told by West Ham that his contract would not be renewed when it expired at the end of the 2020–21 season.

=== Dynamo Moscow ===
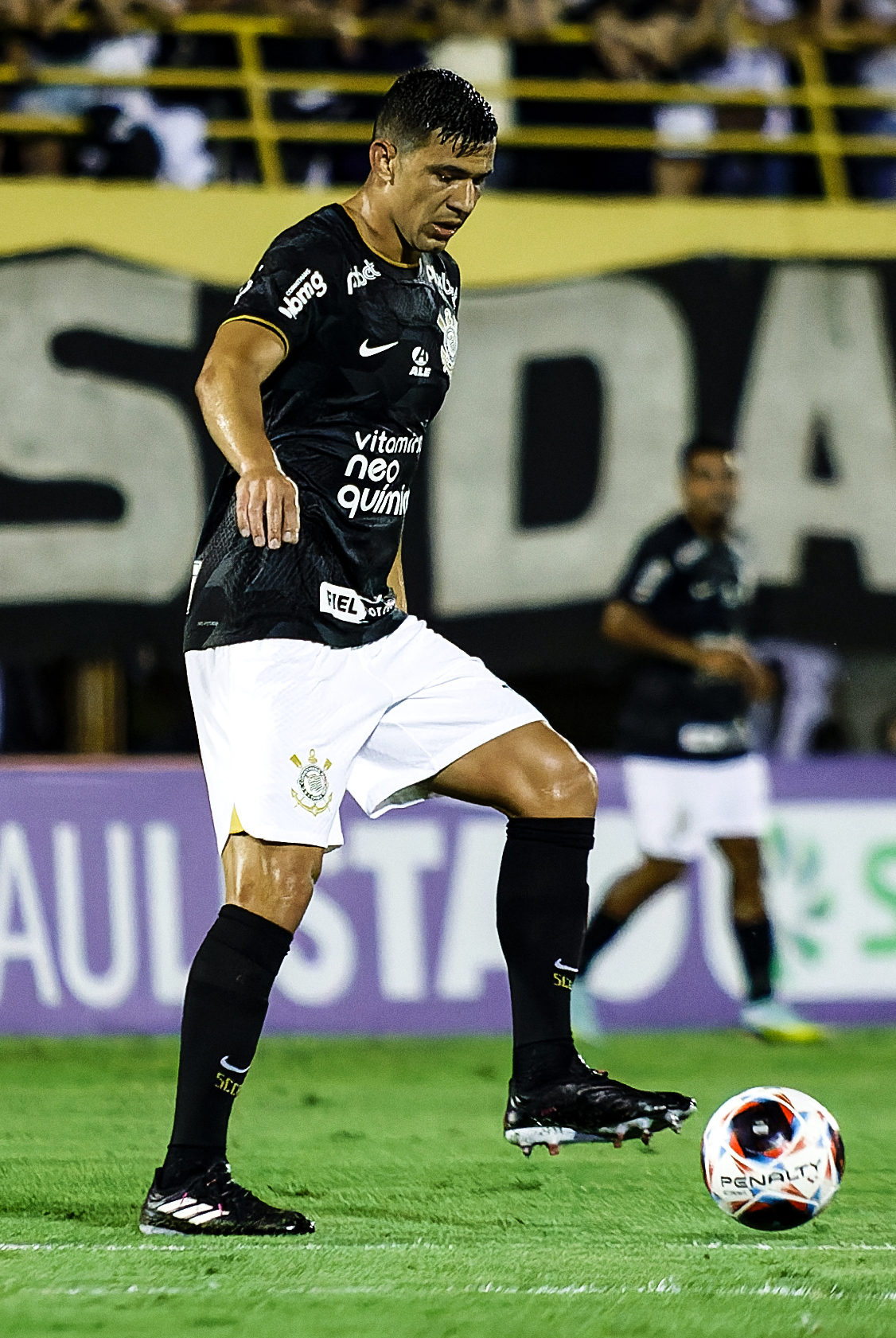
Balbuena with Corinthians in 2023

On 9 July 2021, he signed a four-year contract with Russian Premier League club FC Dynamo Moscow. On 10 July 2022, Balbuena suspended his contract with Dynamo Moscow for the 2022–23 season, having taken advantage of the FIFA ruling relating to the Russian invasion of Ukraine. Eight days later, he returned to Corinthians for the period of his Dynamo contract suspension, until 30 June 2023. At the end of this suspension, Balbuena returned to Dynamo in July 2023. After returning to the Moscow club, Balbuena was chosen as the team captain for the next season. Balbuena left Dynamo on 31 May 2025 as his contract expired.

=== Grêmio ===
On 26 July 2025, Balbuena signed a contract with Grêmio in Brazil until 30 June 2027.

== International career ==
First called up on 19 March 2015, Balbuena made his full international debut for Paraguay national team on 31 March by starting in a 1–0 friendly loss against Mexico at the Arrowhead Stadium. He was also named among the 23-man squads for the 2015 Copa América and the Copa América Centenario. He made his first competitive appearance at the latter in the final group game, a 1–0 loss to hosts the United States in which he was substituted at half time for attacker Juan Iturbe.

At the 2019 Copa América in Brazil, Paraguay faced the host team in the quarter-finals, and Balbuena was sent off after an hour for fouling Roberto Firmino when the Brazilian was clear on goal; the game ended goalless and Brazil won on penalties.

On 23 September 2022, Balbuena scored his first international goal, a late header that was the only goal of a friendly win over the United Arab Emirates in Wiener Neustadt, Austria. In a 1–0 friendly loss away to Peru on 16 November, Balbuena and opponent Alexander Succar were sent off for fighting.

He was called up to the Paraguay's 2026 FIFA World Cup team and made an entry in the round of 32 fixture against Germany that stretched into extra time and ultimately penalties shootout after a 1–1 scoreline. Balbuena missed the fifth penalty kick in the shootout which would have won the game for Paraguay. Paraguay still won the shootout on the next shot after another miss from Germany.

== Career statistics ==
=== Club ===
As of match played 10 May 2026

Appearances and goals by club, season and competition
Club	Season	League			National cup (Note: Includes Copa do Brasil, FA Cup, Russian Cup)		Continental		State League		Other		Total	
Club	Season	Division	Apps	Goals	Apps	Goals	Apps	Goals	Apps	Goals	Apps	Goals	Apps	Goals
Cerro Porteño PF	2010	Paraguayan División Intermedia	7	0	—		—		—		—		7	0
Cerro Porteño PF	2011	Paraguayan División Intermedia	28	4	—		—		—		—		28	4
Cerro Porteño PF	2012	Paraguayan Primera División	41	1	—		—		—		—		41	1
Cerro Porteño PF	Total		76	5	—		—		—		—		76	5
Rubio Ñu	2013	Paraguayan Primera División	17	1	—		—		—		—		17	1
Nacional	2013	Paraguayan Primera División	14	0	—		2 (Note: Appearances in Copa Sudamericana)	0	—		—		16	0
Nacional	2014	Paraguayan Primera División	16	1	—		10 (Note: Appearances in Copa Libertadores)	0	—		—		26	1
Nacional	Total		30	1	—		12	0	—		—		42	1
Libertad	2014	Paraguayan Primera División	16	1	—		4	0	—		—		20	1
Libertad	2015	Paraguayan Primera División	26	2	—		8 (Note: Six appearances in Copa Libertadores, two appearances in Copa Sudamericana)	0	—		—		34	2
Libertad	2016	Paraguayan Primera División	1	0	—		—		—		—		1	0
Libertad	Total		43	3	—		12	0	—		—		55	3
Corinthians	2016	Série A	29	0	4	0	2	0	6 (Note: Appearances in Campeonato Paulista)	2	—		41	2
Corinthians	2017	Série A	32	4	5	0	6	2	15	0	—		58	6
Corinthians	2018	Série A	8	0	2	0	6	0	15	3	—		31	3
Corinthians	Total		69	4	11	0	14	2	36	5	—		130	11
West Ham United	2018–19	Premier League	23	1	0	0	—		—		0	0	23	1
West Ham United	2019–20	Premier League	17	1	2	0	—		—		2 (Note: Appearances in EFL Cup)	0	21	1
West Ham United	2020–21	Premier League	14	1	1	0	—		—		3	0	18	1
West Ham United	Total		54	3	3	0	—		—		5	0	62	3
Dynamo Moscow	2021–22	Russian Premier League	27	3	5	0	—		—		—		32	3
Dynamo Moscow	2023–24	Russian Premier League	26	2	7	1	—		—		—		33	3
Dynamo Moscow	2024–25	Russian Premier League	18	2	6	0	—		—		—		24	2
Dynamo Moscow	Total		71	7	18	1	—		—		—		89	8
Corinthians (loan)	2022	Série A	13	3	6	0	2	0	—		—		21	3
Corinthians (loan)	2023	Série A	0	0	0	0	0	0	7	0	—		7	0
Corinthians (loan)	Total		13	3	6	0	2	0	7	0	—		28	3
Grêmio	2025	Série A	3	1	0	0	0	0	0	0	—		3	1
Grêmio	2026	Série A	7	0	1	0	3	0	3 (Note: Appearances in Campeonato Gaúcho)	0	—		14	0
Grêmio	Total		10	1	1	0	3	0	3	0	—		17	1
Career total			383	28	39	1	43	2	46	5	5	0	516	36

=== International ===
As of match played 29 June 2026

Appearances and goals by national team and year
National team	Year	Apps	Goals
Paraguay	2015	2	0
Paraguay	2016	2	0
Paraguay	2017	1	0
Paraguay	2018	3	0
Paraguay	2019	6	0
Paraguay	2020	3	0
Paraguay	2021	6	0
Paraguay	2022	7	1
Paraguay	2023	5	1
Paraguay	2024	10	0
Paraguay	2025	2	0
Paraguay	2026	2	0
Total		49	2

Scores and results list Paraguay' goal tally first.

List of international goals scored by Fabián Balbuena
No.	Date	Venue	Opponent	Score	Result	Competition
1	23 September 2022	Stadion Wiener Neustadt, Wiener Neustadt, Austria	United Arab Emirates	1–0	1–0	Friendly
2	18 June 2023	Estadio Defensores del Chaco, Asunción, Paraguay	Nicaragua	2–0	2–0	Friendly

== Honours ==
=== Club ===
Cerro Porteño PF

- Paraguayan Second Division: 2011

Libertad

- Primera División: Clausura 2014

Corinthians

- Campeonato Brasileiro Série A: 2017
- Campeonato Paulista: 2017, 2018

Grêmio

- Campeonato Gaúcho: 2026

=== Individual ===
- Bola de Prata: 2017
- Campeonato Brasileiro Team of the Year: 2017
- Best Centre-back in Brazil: 2017
- Campeonato Paulista Team of the Year: 2018
- Russian Premier League Centre-back of the Season: 2021–22
