= Marcos Giménez (footballer, born 1991) =

Paraguayan footballer

Personal information
- Full name: Marcos Antonio Giménez Vera
- Date of birth: 25 January 1991 (age 35)
- Place of birth: Luque, Paraguay
- Height: 1.75 m (5 ft 9 in)
- Position: Midfielder

Team information
- Current team: Deportivo Camba Cuá

Youth career
- Libertad

Senior career*
| Years | Team | Apps | (Gls) |
| 2011–2016 | Libertad | 2 | (0) |
| 2012 | → Tacuary (loan) | 25 | (0) |
| 2013 | → General Díaz (loan) | 5 | (0) |
| 2014 | → Rubio Ñu (loan) | 3 | (0) |
| 2016 | Técnico Universitario | 3 | (0) |
| 2017 | Sarmiento | 7 | (0) |
| 2018–2019 | Deportivo Curupay | | |
| 2020– | Deportivo Camba Cuá | 3 | (0) |

International career
| 2011 | Paraguay U20 | 4 | (0) |
- * Club domestic league appearances and goals as of 17:52, 7 October 2020 (UTC)

Marcos Antonio Giménez Vera (born 25 January 1991) is a Paraguayan professional footballer who plays as a midfielder for Deportivo Camba Cuá.

== Club career ==
Giménez started in Libertad's system, making his debut in the 2011 Paraguayan Primera División on 24 April against Cerro Porteño; he also played versus Tacuary as Libertad placed third. Tacuary loaned Giménez in January 2012. They were relegated at the end of the year, with the midfielder playing twenty-five times. In the next two years, Giménez featured on loan for both General Díaz and Rubio Ñu - participating in eight fixtures. On 2 August 2016, Giménez signed for Ecuadorian Serie B's Técnico Universitario. 2017 saw Giménez join Sarmiento of Torneo Federal A. He made seven appearances.

In mid-2018, having departed Sarmiento, Giménez moved down to Torneo Federal C with Deportivo Curupay. They'd, due to AFA restructuring, eventually head into Torneo Regional Federal Amateur, where he appeared in eight fixtures and scored three goals. In 2020, Giménez joined fellow fourth tier side Deportivo Camba Cuá.

== International career ==
In 2011, Giménez represented Paraguay at the South American U-20 Championship in Peru; winning four caps in the process.

== Career statistics ==
As of 7 October 2020.

Club statistics
| Club | Season | League | | | Cup | | League Cup | | Continental | | Other | | Total | |
| Club | Season | Division | Apps | Goals | Apps | Goals | Apps | Goals | Apps | Goals | Apps | Goals | Apps | Goals |
|---|---|---|---|---|---|---|---|---|---|---|---|---|---|---|
| Libertad | 2011 | Primera División | 2 | 0 | — | | — | | 0 | 0 | 0 | 0 | 2 | 0 |
| Libertad | 2012 | Primera División | 0 | 0 | — | | — | | 0 | 0 | 0 | 0 | 0 | 0 |
| Libertad | 2013 | Primera División | 0 | 0 | — | | — | | 0 | 0 | 0 | 0 | 0 | 0 |
| Libertad | 2014 | Primera División | 0 | 0 | — | | — | | 0 | 0 | 0 | 0 | 0 | 0 |
| Libertad | 2015 | Primera División | 0 | 0 | — | | — | | 0 | 0 | 0 | 0 | 0 | 0 |
| Libertad | 2016 | Primera División | 0 | 0 | — | | — | | 0 | 0 | 0 | 0 | 0 | 0 |
| Libertad | Total | | 2 | 0 | — | | — | | 0 | 0 | 0 | 0 | 2 | 0 |
| Tacuary (loan) | 2012 | Primera División | 25 | 0 | — | | — | | 2 (Note: Appearance(s) in the Copa Sudamericana) | 0 | 0 | 0 | 27 | 0 |
| General Díaz (loan) | 2013 | Primera División | 5 | 0 | — | | — | | — | | 0 | 0 | 5 | 0 |
| Rubio Ñu (loan) | 2014 | Primera División | 3 | 0 | — | | — | | — | | 0 | 0 | 3 | 0 |
| Técnico Universitario | 2016 | Serie B | 3 | 0 | — | | — | | — | | 0 | 0 | 3 | 0 |
| Sarmiento | 2017–18 | Torneo Federal A | 7 | 0 | 0 | 0 | — | | — | | 0 | 0 | 7 | 0 |
| Deportivo Curupay | 2019 | Torneo Amateur | 8 | 3 | 0 | 0 | — | | — | | 0 | 0 | 8 | 3 |
| Deportivo Camba Cuá | 2020 | Torneo Amateur | 3 | 0 | 0 | 0 | — | | — | | 0 | 0 | 3 | 0 |
| Career total | | | 56 | 3 | 0 | 0 | — | | 2 | 0 | 0 | 0 | 58 | 3 |
