= 2011 Paraguayan Segunda División season =

Segunda División
- Season: 2011
- Champions: Cerro Porteño PF (1st title)
- Relegated: Deportivo Caaguazú; 12 de Octubre
- Matches played: 182
- Goals scored: 418 (2.3 per match)

The 2011 División Intermedia season (officially the 2011 Copa TIGO- Visión Banco for sponsorship reasons) was the 15th season semi-professional football in Paraguay.

It began on March 19 and ended on September 24.

== Teams ==
Team	Coaches	Home City	Stadium	Capacity
12 de Octubre	Guillermo Giménez	Itauguá	Juan Canuto Pettengill	8,000
Atlético Colegiales	Edgar Denis	Lambaré	Luciano Zacarías	15,000
Cerro Porteño PF	Eduardo Rivera	Presidente Franco	Cerro Porteño	5,000
Deportivo Caaguazú	Silvino Pereira	Caaguazú	Federico Llamosas	7,000
Deportivo Capiatá	Juan Ñumbay	Capiatá	Capiatá	4,000
Deportivo Santaní	Robert Gauto	San Estanislao	Juan José Vázquez	4,000
Fernando de la Mora	Daniel Sosa	Asunción	Emiliano Ghezzi	7,000
General Díaz	Humberto García	Luque	General Adrián Jara	3,500
River Plate	Mario Rivarola	Asunción	River Plate	5,000
San Lorenzo	Juan González	San Lorenzo	Ciudad Universitaria	4,000
Sport Colombia	Humberto Ovelar	Fernando de la Mora	Alfonso Colmán	7,000
Sportivo Carapeguá	Pedro Fleitas	Carapeguá	Teniente 1º Alcides González	3,500
Sportivo Iteño	Hugo Ovelar	Itá	Salvador Morga	4,000
Sportivo Trinidense	Gabino Román	Asunción	Martín Torres	3,000

== Standings ==
Pos	Team	Pld	W	D	L	GF	GA	GD	Pts	Promotion or relegation
1	Cerro Porteño PF	26	13	6	7	43	28	+15	45	Promoted to 2012 Paraguayan Primera División season
2	Sportivo Carapeguá	26	13	6	7	41	29	+12	45	Promoted to 2012 Paraguayan Primera División season
3	Deportivo Capiatá	26	12	8	6	39	26	+13	44	
4	Deportivo Santaní	26	11	11	4	28	22	+6	44	
5	River Plate	26	9	10	7	32	36	−4	37	
6	General Díaz	26	9	9	8	30	28	+2	36	
7	Atlético Colegiales	26	7	12	7	23	28	−5	33	
8	San Lorenzo	26	7	11	8	36	37	−1	32	
9	Fernando de la Mora	26	7	10	9	28	29	−1	31	
10	Sportivo Iteño	26	6	11	9	22	24	−2	29	
11	Sportivo Trinidense	26	7	8	11	22	31	−9	29	
12	Sport Colombia	26	6	10	10	21	26	−5	28	
13	Deportivo Caaguazú	26	5	9	12	29	37	−8	24	Relegated
14	12 de Octubre	26	3	13	10	24	37	−13	22	Relegated

=== Results ===
Home \ Away	12O	ACO	CPF	DCZ	DCT	DSA	FDM	GED	RIV	SLO	SCO	SCA	ITE	TRI
12 de Octubre		0–0	0–1	1–1	1–4	1–1	1–2	1–1	4–0	1–1	2–0	0–0	0–1	0–0
Atlético Colegiales	1–0		2–1	4–3	1–0	0–0	1–0	0–4	0–0	1–1	0–1	0–0	2–1	1–2
Cerro Porteño PF	2–1	0–0		1–0	2–1	1–2	2–0	4–1	6–0	2–3	2–1	3–2	0–0	5–2
Deportivo Caaguazú	4–1	2–2	1–1		0–2	0–0	1–1	0–1	1–1	1–1	1–1	1–1	1–0	0–0
Deportivo Capiatá	1–0	2–1	1–2	2–1		1–1	1–1	1–1	5–1	2–2	1–1	2–1	1–1	3–0
Deportivo Santaní	1–1	1–1	0–0	1–0	1–1		3–0	1–1	2–1	2–1	2–1	2–1	1–0	1–1
Fernando de la Mora	4–0	0–0	3–0	1–2	2–1	1–2		0–2	2–1	2–2	1–1	1–1	1–0	1–0
General Díaz	1–3	0–0	3–2	2–2	0–1	1–2	0–0		1–1	0–1	1–0	2–0	1–0	2–0
River Plate	1–1	2–1	1–1	1–2	2–0	1–0	0–0	4–0		1–1	2–1	3–0	0–1	2–3
San Lorenzo	2–2	2–1	1–1	2–3	1–2	4–0	1–0	1–1	2–0		1–1	1–5	1–1	0–2
Sport Colombia	0–0	0–0	1–1	1–1	1–0	1–0	2–1	2–0	1–1	1–2		1–1	1–1	0–1
Sportivo Carapeguá	5–0	1–1	1–0	4–1	1–0	0–1	3–2	1–0	1–2	3–2	1–0			1–0
Sportivo Iteño	1–1	4–1	0–1	1–0	1–1	2–1	1–1	0–3	1–1	1–0	2–0	1–1		0–1
Sportivo Trinidense	2–2	1–2	0–2	0–1	1–2	0–0	0–0	0–1	1–1	1–0	1–0	2–3	0–0	

Legend: Blue = home team win; Yellow = draw; Red = away team win.

=== Final ===
Sportivo Carapeguá and Cerro Porteño PF were ended with a same scores, therefore was made a grand final, to determinate the champion of the tournament. The winner was Cerro Porteño PF.

Home	Score	Away
Sportivo Carapeguá	1 - 2	Cerro Porteño PF
Cerro Porteño PF	0 - 0	Sportivo Carapeguá

== Top goalscorers ==
Player	Goals	Teams
Marco Prieto	13	Sportivo Carapeguá
Rogerio Leitchweis	13	San Lorenzo
Francisco López	11	Cerro Porteño PF
Víctor Lugo	11	Fernando de la Mora
Ernesto Álvarez	10	River Plate

- All Paraguayans
