= Ariel Coronel (Paraguayan footballer) =

Paraguayan footballer (born 1987)

Personal information
- Full name: Blas Ariel Coronel
- Date of birth: 10 December 1987 (age 38)
- Place of birth: Asunción, Paraguay
- Height: 1.78 m (5 ft 10 in)
- Position: Defender

Team information
- Current team: Deportivo Capiatá

Senior career*
Years	Team	Apps	(Gls)
2008–2010	Rubio Ñu	25	(0)
2011	Independiente	11	(0)
2011	Rubio Ñu	21	(1)
2012	Fernando de la Mora		
2012–2013	Sportivo Luqueño	15	(0)
2014	Rubio Ñu	0	(0)
2018	Deportivo Caaguazú		
2018	Resistencia	22	(2)
2019–	Deportivo Capiatá	8	(0)
- * Club domestic league appearances and goals as of 22:42, 2 July 2020 (UTC)

Blas Ariel Coronel (born 10 December 1987) is a Paraguayan professional footballer who plays as a defender for Deportivo Capiatá.

== Career ==
Rubio Ñu were Coronel's first senior club, the defender appeared twenty-five times between 2008 and 2010. Coronel had a stint with Independiente in 2011 before rejoining Rubio Ñu later that year, with his opening senior goal arriving on 10 September 2011 against Nacional. Paraguayan División Intermedia side Fernando de la Mora signed Coronel in 2012, months prior to Sportivo Luqueño of the Paraguayan Primera División doing the same. He remained for the 2012 and 2013 campaigns before resigning with Rubio Ñu in 2014. Coronel subsequently played for Deportivo Caaguazú and Resistencia in 2018.

Following two goals in twenty-two games for Resistencia in División Intermedia, Coronel moved up to the top-flight in 2019 with Deportivo Capiatá. He made a total of eight appearances, which included a debut over ex-club Sportivo Luqueño, as they suffered relegation.

== Career statistics ==
As of 2 July 2020.

Club statistics
Club	Season	League			Cup		League Cup		Continental		Other		Total	
Club	Season	Division	Apps	Goals	Apps	Goals	Apps	Goals	Apps	Goals	Apps	Goals	Apps	Goals
Rubio Ñu	2010	Primera División	6	0	—		—		—		0	0	6	0
Independiente	2011	Primera División	11	0	—		—		—		0	0	11	0
Rubio Ñu	2011	Primera División	21	1	—		—		—		0	0	21	1
Sportivo Luqueño	2012	Primera División	7	0	—		—		—		0	0	7	0
Sportivo Luqueño	2013	Primera División	8	0	—		—		—		0	0	8	0
Sportivo Luqueño	Total		15	0	—		—		—		0	0	15	0
Rubio Ñu	2014	Primera División	0	0	—		—		—		0	0	0	0
Resistencia	2018	División Intermedia	22	2	0	0	—		—		0	0	22	2
Deportivo Capiatá	2019	Primera División	8	0	0	0	—		—		0	0	8	0
Career total			83	3	0	0	—		—		0	0	83	3
