= List of stadiums in Paraguay =

This is a list of major sport stadiums in Paraguay.

== Cities ==
=== Luque ===
- Paraguayan Olympic Committee Olympic Stadium (Luque)
- Estadio Feliciano Caceres (Luque)

=== Asunción ===
- Jockey Club (Asunción)
- Secretaria Nacional de Deportes Arena (Asunción)
- Secretaria Nacional de Deportes (Asunción)
- Estadio Defensores del Chaco (Asunción)
- Estadio General Pablo Rojas (Asunción)
- Estadio Manuel Ferreira (Asunción)
- Estadio Arsenio Erico (Asunción)
- Estadio Roberto Bettega (Asunción)
- Estadio Tigo La Huerta (Asunción)
- Estadio Rogelio Livieres (Asunción)
- Estadio Bernabé Pedrozo (Asunción)

=== Pedro Juan Caballero ===
- Monumental Río Parapití (Pedro Juan Caballero)

=== Atyrá ===
- Estadio Agustín Baez (Atyrá)

=== Itauguá ===
- Estadio Juan Canuto Pettengill (Itauguá)

=== Ciudad del Este ===
- Estadio Antonio Aranda (Ciudad del Este)
- Estadio R.I. 3 Corrales (Ciudad del Este)
- Estadio Sol del Este (Ciudad del Este)

=== Minga Guazú ===
- Estadio Paí Coronel (Mingua Guazú)

=== Encarnación ===
- Centro de Alto Rendimiento Deportivo del Sur Olympic Stadium (Encarnación)
- Estadio Hugo Stroessner (Encarnación)
- Estadio Club 22 de Setiembre (Encarnación)

=== San Estanislao ===
- Estadio Juan José Vázquez (San Estanislao)

=== Coronel Oviedo ===
- Estadio Ovetenses Unidos (Coronel Oviedo)

=== Carapeguá ===
- Estadio Municipal de Carapegua (Carapeguá)

== See also ==
- List of sports venues in Asunción
- List of stadiums by capacity
- List of South American stadiums by capacity
- List of association football stadiums by capacity
