= Gustavo Noguera =

Paraguayan footballer (born 1987)

Personal information
- Full name: Gustavo David Noguera Domínguez
- Date of birth: 7 November 1987 (age 39)
- Place of birth: Itacurubí de la Cordillera, Paraguay
- Height: 1.75 m (5 ft 9 in)
- Position: Right-back

Team information
- Current team: General Díaz
- Number: 3

Senior career*
Years	Team	Apps	(Gls)
2005	Club Libertad		
2006	12 de Octubre		
2006–2007	Club Libertad		
2007	3 de Febrero		
2008	Club 2 de Mayo		
2009	Club Nacional		
2009	Club Libertad		
2010	Sol de América		
2010	Sportivo Luqueño		
2011–2012	Club Nacional		
2012	Tacuary		
2013	Cerro Porteño PF		
2014	Olimpia		
2015–2016	Quilmes		
2016–2019	Deportivo Capiatá		
2020	General Díaz		
2020–2021	Sol de América		
2021	Rubio Ñu		
- * Club domestic league appearances and goals as of 17:27, 8 March 2020 (UTC)

Gustavo David Noguera Domínguez (born 7 November 1987 in Santa Elena, Paraguay) is a Paraguayan footballer who plays as a right-back. He previously had a lengthy career in Paraguayan football, and also briefly played for Argentine club Quilmes.
