= 2012 Paraguayan Segunda División season =

Segunda División
- Season: 2012
- Champions: General Díaz (1st title)
- Relegated: Atl. Colegiales, Sportivo Iteño, 29 de Setiembre
- Matches: 240
- Goals: 616 (2.57 per match)
- Average goals/game: 2,6

The 2012 División Intermedia season (officially the 2012 Copa TIGO- Visión Banco for sponsorship reasons) was the 16th season of semi-professional football in Paraguay. In this season, were added 2 teams more to the championship, and added average points for relegation.

It began on March 17 and ended on October 14.

General Díaz won the league title.

== Teams ==
Team	Home City	Stadium	Capacity
29 de Setiembre	Luque	29 de Setiembre	3,000
2 de Mayo	Pedro Juan Caballero	Río Parapití	25,000
3 de Febrero	Ciudad del Este	A. Oddone Sarubbi	28,000
Atlético Colegiales	Lambaré	Luciano Zacarías	15,000
Deportivo Capiatá	Capiatá	Capiatá	4,000
Deportivo Santaní	San Estanislao	Juan José Vázquez	4,000
Fernando de la Mora	Asunción	Emiliano Ghezzi	7,000
General Caballero	Asunción	Hugo Bogado Vaceque	5,000
General Díaz	Luque	General Adrián Jara	3,500
Resistencia	Asunción	Tomás Beygon Gorea	3,500
River Plate	Asunción	River Plate	5,000
San Lorenzo	San Lorenzo	Ciudad Universitaria	4,000
Sport Colombia	Fernando de la Mora	Alfonso Colmán	7,000
Sportivo Iteño	Itá	Salvador Morga	4,000
Sportivo Trinidense	Asunción	Martín Torres	3,000
Paranaense F.C.	Ciudad del Este	A. Oddone Sarubbi	28,000

== Standings ==
Pos	Team	Pld	W	D	L	GF	GA	GD	Pts	Promotion
1	General Díaz	30	18	6	6	48	23	+25	60	Promoted to 2013 Paraguayan Primera División season
2	Deportivo Capiatá	30	17	7	6	61	37	+24	58	Promoted to 2013 Paraguayan Primera División season
3	Deportivo Santaní	30	15	9	6	46	27	+19	54	
4	San Lorenzo	30	14	6	10	40	35	+5	48	
5	Sportivo Trinidense	30	13	7	10	32	33	−1	46	
6	Sport Colombia	30	12	7	11	47	33	+14	43	
7	3 de Febrero	30	12	6	12	45	41	+4	42	
8	2 de Mayo	30	12	6	12	37	37	0	42	
9	General Caballero	30	12	6	12	31	31	0	42	
10	River Plate	30	11	8	11	38	45	−7	41	
11	Resistencia	30	10	10	10	43	45	−2	40	
12	Fernando de la Mora	30	10	6	14	31	40	−9	36	
13	Paranaense	30	8	10	12	31	39	−8	34	
14	Atlético Colegiales	30	7	12	11	22	29	−7	33	
15	Sportivo Iteño	30	4	11	15	36	57	−21	23	
16	29 de Setiembre	30	4	5	21	28	64	−36	17	

== Relegation ==
Relegations are determined at the end of the season by computing an average (Spanish: promedio) of the number of points earned per game over the past three seasons. The three teams with the lowest average are relegated.

Pos	Team	Avg	Total Pts	Total Pld	2011	2012
1º	Deportivo Capiatá	1,821	102	56	44	58
2º	Deportivo Santaní	1,750	98	56	44	54
3º	General Díaz	1,714	96	56	36	60
4º	River Plate	1,393	78	56	37	41
5º	3 de Febrero	1,367	42	30	-	42
6º	General Caballero	1,367	42	30	-	42
7º	San Lorenzo	1,357	76	56	28	48
8º	Sportivo Trinidense	1,339	75	56	29	46
9º	2 de Mayo	1,333	40	30	-	40
10º	Resistencia	1,333	40	30	-	40
11º	Sport Colombia	1,285	72	56	28	44
12º	Fernando de la Mora	1,250	70	56	34	36
13º	Paranaense	1,133	34	30	-	34
14º	Atlético Colegiales	1,125	63	56	30	33
15º	Sportivo Iteño	0,929	52	56	29	23
16º	29 de Setiembre	0,567	17	30	-	17

Relegated

- Pos: Position, Avg: Average, Total Pts: Total Points, Total Pld: Total Played

== Top goalscorers ==
- Christian López (17 goals) from Deportivo Capiatá
