= Sixto Ramírez =

Paraguayan footballer (born 1990)

Personal information
- Full name: Sixto Rodrigo Ramírez Cardozo
- Date of birth: 29 June 1990 (age 36)
- Place of birth: San Lorenzo, Paraguay
- Height: 1.85 m (6 ft 1 in)
- Position: Centre-back

Team information
- Current team: 12 de Octubre
- Number: 25

Senior career*
Years	Team	Apps	(Gls)
2011–2013	Sportivo Luqueño	1	(0)
2014	Coquimbo Unido	17	(3)
2015	Nacional	10	(1)
2016–2018	Ayacucho	77	(5)
2020	Deportivo Coopsol	8	(0)
2021	Deportivo Capiatá	–	(–)
2022–	12 de Octubre	5	(0)
- * Club domestic league appearances and goals as of 17 July 2022

Sixto Rodrigo Ramírez Cardozo (born 29 July 1990) is a Paraguayan footballer who plays for 12 de Octubre.

He formerly played for Coquimbo Unido.
