= Ariel Coronel =

Ariel Coronel may refer to:

- Ariel Coronel (Argentine footballer) (born 1987), Argentine defender
- Ariel Coronel (Paraguayan footballer) (born 1987), Paraguayan defender
