= Luizão (footballer, born 1988) =

Brazilian footballer

Personal information
- Full name: Luiz Fernando dos Santos
- Date of birth: 22 October 1988 (age 38)
- Place of birth: Porto União, Brazil
- Position: Striker

Team information
- Current team: Altos

Senior career*
Years	Team	Apps	(Gls)
2006–2008	Toledo		
2008	→ Foz do Iguaçu (loan)		
2009	Santa Cruz–RS		
2009	Batel		
2010	Toledo		
2010	Votuporanguense		
2011	Juventus		
2011	União São João		
2011	Santa Rita		
2011	→ Olinda (loan)		
2011	→ União–AL (loan)		
2012	São Carlos		
2012	Fernandópolis		
2012–2013	Porto–SC		
2014–2015	3 de Febrero	7	(0)
2015	→ Mixto (loan)		
2015	Fast Clube		
2016–2017	Globo	6	(0)
2018	Central	3	(0)
2019–	Altos		
- * Club domestic league appearances and goals as of 19 March 2019

Luiz Fernando dos Santos (born 22 October 1988), simply known as Luizão, is a Brazilian footballer who plays for Altos as a striker.

== Career statistics ==
As of 19 March 2019

Club	Season	League			State League		Cup		Continental		Other		Total	
Club	Season	Division	Apps	Goals	Apps	Goals	Apps	Goals	Apps	Goals	Apps	Goals	Apps	Goals
Santa Cruz–RS	2009	Gaúcho	—		2	0	—		—		—		2	0
Juventus	2011	Paulista A3	—		4	0	—		—		—		4	0
União São João	2011	Paulista A2	—		5	0	—		—		—		5	0
São Carlos	2012	Paulista A2	—		6	0	—		—		—		6	0
3 de Febrero	2014	Paraguayan	7	0	—		—		—		—		7	0
Globo	2016	Série D	6	0	—		—		—		—		6	0
Globo	2017	Série D	—		17	3	1	0	—		—		18	3
Globo	Subtotal		6	0	17	3	1	0	—		—		24	3
Central	2018	Série D	3	0	10	2	—		—		—		13	2
Altos	2019	Série D	—		4	1	1	1	—		5 (Note: All appearance(s) in Copa do Nordeste)	0	10	2
Career total			16	0	48	6	2	1	0	0	5	0	71	7
