= Paranaense =

Paranaense may refer to:

- Campeonato Paranaense, Brazilian association football league
- Clube Atlético Paranaense, Brazilian association football club
- Paranaense F.C., a Paraguayan association football club
- Sport Club Corinthians Paranaense, Brazilian association football club
