= Notario =

Notario is a surname. Notable people with the surname include:

- Antonio Notario (born 1972), Spanish footballer
- Hugo Notario (born 1980), Argentine-born Paraguayan footballer
