= Wilson Méndez =

Paraguayan footballer (born 1982)

Personal information
- Full name: Wilson Heriberto Méndez
- Date of birth: 25 May 1982 (age 44)
- Place of birth: Presidente Franco, Paraguay
- Height: 1.74 m (5 ft 9 in)
- Position: Defender

Senior career*
Years	Team	Apps	(Gls)
2003–2004	Cerro Porteño PF		
2005–2008	3 de Febrero	158	(5)
2009	Sportivo Luqueño	9	(0)
2009	12 de Octubre	17	(0)
2010–2012	Curicó Unido	101	(9)
2013–2014	3 de Febrero	total	(above)
2015	Cerro Porteño PF		
2015	Gran Valencia		
- * Club domestic league appearances and goals

Wilson Heriberto Méndez (born 25 May 1982 in Presidente Franco, Paraguay) is a former Paraguayan footballer who played as a defender.

== Teams ==
- (Paraguay) Cerro Porteño PF 2003–2004
- (Paraguay) 3 de Febrero 2005–2008
- (Paraguay) Sportivo Luqueño 2009
- (Paraguay) 12 de Octubre 2009
- (Chile) Curicó Unido 2010–2012
- (Paraguay) 3 de Febrero 2013–2014
- (Paraguay) Cerro Porteño PF 2015
- (Venezuela) Gran Valencia 2015
