= Miguel Godoy =

Miguel Godoy may refer to:

- Miguel Godoy (footballer) (born 1983), Paraguayan footballer
- Miguel Godoy (basketball) (1907–2002), Peruvian basketball player
