= Marcos Gamarra =

Paraguayan footballer (born 1988)

Personal information
- Full name: Marcos Antonio Gamarra Arbiniagaldez
- Date of birth: 8 July 1988 (age 38)
- Place of birth: Luque, Paraguay
- Height: 1.77 m (5 ft 9 1/2 in)
- Position: Defender

Team information
- Current team: Olimpia (Itá)

Senior career*
Years	Team	Apps	(Gls)
2009	12 de Octubre		
2013–2014	General Díaz	46	(2)
2015–2017	Deportivo Capiatá	46	(2)
2017	Independiente de Campo Grande	11	(0)
2018	Sportivo Luqueño	27	(1)
2019	12 de Octubre		
2020–2021	General Díaz	8	(0)
2022–2023	→ Cd Recoleta		
2024–	Olimpia (Itá)		
- * Club domestic league appearances and goals as of 13:29, 9 January 2026 (UTC)

Marcos Antonio Gamarra Arbiniagaldez (born 8 July 1988) is a Paraguayan professional footballer who plays as a defender for Olimpia (Itá) of Paraguay.
