= Marcos Giménez =

Marcos Giménez may refer to:

- Marcos Giménez (footballer, born 1989), Argentine midfielder
- Marcos Giménez (footballer, born 1991), Paraguayan midfielder
