= Mikel Arce =

Spanish footballer

Personal information
- Full name: Mikel Arce Hualde
- Date of birth: 15 June 1984 (age 42)
- Place of birth: Pamplona, Spain
- Height: 1.91 m (6 ft 3 in)
- Position: Forward

Youth career
- Osasuna
- Real Sociedad

Senior career*
Years	Team	Apps	(Gls)
2002–2003	Real Sociedad B		
2003–2004	Numancia B		
2004–2005	Alfaro		
2005	Logroñés		
2006	Lemona	1	(0)
2006	Calahorra		
2007	Constància		
2007–2008	Lourdes	35	(20)
2008–2009	San Jose Earthquakes	0	(0)
2009	12 de Octubre	4	(0)
2009–2010	Lorca Deportiva		
2010–2011	Aluvión		
2011–2014	Valtierrano		
- * Club domestic league appearances and goals

Mikel Arce Hualde (born 15 June 1984) is a Spanish former footballer who played as a forward.

== Club career ==
=== Early years ===
Arce was born in Pamplona, Navarre. After graduating from CA Osasuna's youth academy he spent the entirety of his Spanish career in the lower leagues; he appeared only once in the Segunda División B, as a second-half substitute in SD Lemona's 3–0 away win against Marino de Luanco.

In the 2007–08 season, Arce scored 20 Tercera División goals for CD Lourdes. Subsequently, he signed for Major League Soccer side San Jose Earthquakes.

=== Paraguay ===
In the following transfer window, Arce he moved teams and countries again, joining 12 de Octubre Football Club for whom he featured in the Paraguayan Primera División as the first Spaniard ever in the competition following the creation of the Paraguayan Football Association. Previously, he had a trial with Olimpia Asunción in the same country.

Arce said of his spell in Paraguay, compared to that of the United States, that he thought he would have an easier time adapting because he spoke the same language as the natives. However, he found that the challenge of learning Guarani was the equivalent of switching from Spanish to Basque in his homeland.

=== Later career ===
In the summer of 2009, Arce returned to Spain and resumed his career in the lower divisions and amateur football.

== Personal life ==
In October 2012, in a Beauty King and Queen contest held in Villarrobledo, Arce finished in third position, being elected Best Spanish Body in the process.
