= Juan Espínola (footballer, born 1994) =

Paraguayan footballer

Personal information
- Full name: Juan Ángel Espínola González
- Date of birth: 2 November 1994 (age 32)
- Place of birth: Ciudad del Este, Paraguay
- Height: 1.85 m (6 ft 1 in)
- Position: Goalkeeper

Team information
- Current team: Barracas Central (on loan from Newell's Old Boys)
- Number: 1

Youth career
- Cerro Porteño PF

Senior career*
Years	Team	Apps	(Gls)
2012–2014	Cerro Porteño PF	25	(0)
2014–2015	Sarmiento	0	(0)
2015–2021	Nacional	33	(0)
2021–2023	Godoy Cruz	44	(0)
2023–2025	Olimpia	29	(0)
2024–2025	→ Belgrano (loan)	26	(0)
2025–	Newell's Old Boys	12	(0)
2026–	→ Barracas Central (loan)	6	(0)

International career^{‡}
2022–	Paraguay	1	(0)
- * Club domestic league appearances and goals as of 16:56, 3 June 2026 (UTC) ‡ National team caps and goals as of 15 September 2024

Juan Ángel Espínola González (born 2 November 1994) is a Paraguayan professional footballer who plays as a goalkeeper for Argentine Primera División club Barracas Central, on loan from Newell's Old Boys and the Paraguay national team.

== Club career ==
Espínola was born in Ciudad del Este. He made his senior debut with Cerro Porteño de Presidente Franco on 22 May 2013, starting in a 2–1 away win against Sportivo Carapeguá for the Primera División championship.

In 2014, Espínola moved abroad and joined Sarmiento. He returned to his home country in the following year, joining Nacional Asunción.

Midway through the 2018 season, Espínola became a regular starter at Nacional.

== Internacional career ==
On 14 March 2019, Espínola was called up by Paraguay national team manager Eduardo Berizzo for friendlies against Peru and Mexico, but did not take part in either match.

== Career statistics ==
=== International ===
As of match played 17 November 2022

Appearances and goals by national team and year
National team	Year	Apps	Goals
Paraguay	2022	1	0
Total		1	0
