= Álvaro Campuzano =

Paraguayan footballer

Personal information
- Full name: Álvaro Marcial Campuzano
- Date of birth: 12 June 1995 (age 31)
- Place of birth: Barrero, Cordillera, Paraguay
- Height: 1.85 m (6 ft 1 in)
- Position: Midfielder

Team information
- Current team: Libertad
- Number: 6

Senior career*
Years	Team	Apps	(Gls)
2015–2019	Rubio Ñú	58	(1)
2019–2020	General Díaz	41	(3)
2020–	Libertad	101	(6)

International career^{‡}
2023–	Paraguay	4	(0)
- * Club domestic league appearances and goals as of 12 August 2025 ‡ National team caps and goals as of 11 September 2024

Álvaro Marcial Campuzano (born 12 June 1995) is a Paraguayan professional footballer who plays as a midfielder for Paraguayan Primera División club Libertad and the Paraguay national team.

== Club career ==
Born in Barrero, Campuzano first played for the youth academy of Libertad, Rubio Ñú and Cerro Porteño. He started his senior career in 2015 in Rubio Ñú.

In October 2020, he signed for Libertad.

== International career ==
Campuzano made his debut for the Paraguay national team on 18 June 2023, against Nicaragua.

== Personal life ==
Of low-income origins, Campuzano never knew his father; and his mother migrated to Argentina for work when he was 4 years old. He was raised by his grandparents.

== Career statistics ==
As of match played on 3 September 2023

Appearances and goals by club, season and competition
Club	Season	League			National cup		South America		Total	
Club	Season	Division	Apps	Goals	Apps	Goals	Apps	Goals	Apps	Goals
Rubio Ñú	2015	Paraguayan Primera División	15	0	—		—		15	0
Rubio Ñú	2016	Paraguayan Primera División	21	0	—		—		21	0
Rubio Ñú	2017	Paraguayan Primera División	22	1	—		—		22	1
Rubio Ñú	Total		58	1	0	0	0	0	58	1
General Díaz	2019	Paraguayan Primera División	21	1	—		—		21	1
General Díaz	2020	Paraguayan Primera División	20	2	—		—		20	2
General Díaz	Total		41	3	0	0	0	0	41	3
Libertad	2020	Paraguayan Primera División	7	2	—		4	0	11	2
Libertad	2021	Paraguayan Primera División	0	0	—		0	0	0	0
Libertad	2022	Paraguayan Primera División	12	1	—		2	0	14	1
Libertad	2023	Paraguayan Primera División	23	0	—		9	0	32	0
Libertad	Total		42	3	0	0	15	0	57	3
Career total			141	7	0	0	15	0	156	7

== Honours ==
Libertad

- Paraguayan Primera División: Apertura 2021, Apertura 2022, Apertura 2023, Clausura 2023
