= Elías Moreira =

Brazilian footballer

Personal information
- Full name: Elias Moreira Roberto
- Date of birth: 7 April 1992 (age 34)
- Place of birth: Brazil
- Position: Forward

Team information
- Current team: Sportivo Luqueño

Senior career*
Years	Team	Apps	(Gls)
2013–2015	Cerro Porteño PF		
2016–	Sportivo Luqueño		
- * Club domestic league appearances and goals

Elias Moreira Roberto (born 7 April 1992) is a Brazilian professional footballer who plays as a forward for Club Sportivo Luqueño in the Primera División Paraguaya.

== Career ==
=== Cerro Porteño PF ===
Moreira joined Cerro PF on 1 July 2013.

He played with Cerro Porteño PF since 2013, in the First, Second and Third divisions of Paraguay. He participated in the 2013 Primera Division Paraguaya, the 2014 Division Intermedia and the 2015 Primera Division B Nacional.

The player joined for pre-season Club Atlético 3 de Febrero at the start of 2015 and was expected to play in the 2015 División Intermedia for the Ciudad del Este club but did not sign and eventually returned to Cerro PF.

=== Sportivo Luqueño ===
Moreira united to Sportivo Luqueño in 2016, where his first participation was in Round 1 of the reserve league where he entered the field as a substitute in the second half and scored 13 minutes later.

== Statistics ==
- Cerro PF – 2013 season: 12/4
- Cerro PF – 2014 season:
- Cerro PF – 2015 season:
