= 2012 APF División de Honor =

División de Honor
- Season: 2012
- Champions: Apertura: Cerro Porteño (29th title); Clausura: Libertad (16th title)
- Relegated: Tacuary; Independiente
- Copa Libertadores: Cerro Porteño; Libertad; Olimpia
- Copa Sudamericana: Cerro Porteño; Libertad; Nacional; Guaraní
- Matches: 264
- Goals: 675 (2.56 per match)

The 2012 División de Honor (officially the 2012 Copa TIGO- Visión Banco for sponsorship reasons) was the 78th season of top-flight professional football in Paraguay.

== Teams ==
Locations of the 2012 Primera División teams

| Team | Home city | Stadium | Capacity |
|---|---|---|---|
| Cerro Porteño | Asunción | General Pablo Rojas | 32,000 |
| Cerro Porteño (PF) | Presidente Franco | Cerro Porteño | 10,000 |
| Guaraní | Asunción | Rogelio Livieres | 6,000 |
| Independiente | Asunción | Ricardo Gregor | 1,500 |
| Libertad | Asunción | Dr. Nicolás Leoz | 10,000 |
| Nacional | Asunción | Arsenio Erico | 4,000 |
| Olimpia | Asunción | Manuel Ferreira | 15,000 |
| Rubio Ñu | Asunción | La Arboleda | 5,000 |
| Sol de América | Villa Elisa | Luis Alfonso Giagni | 5,000 |
| Sportivo Carapeguá | Carapeguá | Tte. 1º Alcides González | 3,000 |
| Sportivo Luqueño | Luque | Feliciano Cáceres | 25,000 |
| Tacuary | Asunción | Roberto Béttega | 7,000 |

== Torneo Apertura ==
The Campeonato de Apertura, also the Copa TIGO-Visión Banco for sponsorship reasons, was the 106º official championship of the Primera División, called "Don Jesús Manuel Pallarés", and was the first championship of the 2012 season. It began on February 5 and ended on July 8.

=== Standings ===
| Pos | Team | Pld | W | D | L | GF | GA | GD | Pts | Qualification or relegation |
|---|---|---|---|---|---|---|---|---|---|---|
| 1 | Cerro Porteño | 22 | 16 | 1 | 5 | 40 | 23 | +17 | 49 | 2013 Copa Libertadores Second Stage and 2013 Copa Sudamericana First Stage |
| 2 | Olimpia | 22 | 14 | 5 | 3 | 30 | 20 | +10 | 47 | |
| 3 | Libertad | 22 | 13 | 5 | 4 | 40 | 19 | +21 | 44 | |
| 4 | Sol de América | 22 | 11 | 2 | 9 | 38 | 27 | +11 | 35 | |
| 5 | Nacional | 22 | 10 | 3 | 9 | 40 | 32 | +8 | 33 | |
| 6 | Guaraní | 22 | 8 | 6 | 8 | 28 | 25 | +3 | 30 | |
| 7 | Cerro Porteño (PF) | 22 | 7 | 6 | 9 | 26 | 29 | −3 | 27 | |
| 8 | Sportivo Luqueño | 22 | 6 | 8 | 8 | 23 | 30 | −7 | 26 | |
| 9 | Independiente | 22 | 6 | 7 | 9 | 28 | 42 | −14 | 25 | |
| 10 | Sportivo Carapeguá | 22 | 4 | 8 | 10 | 23 | 29 | −6 | 20 | |
| 11 | Rubio Ñu | 22 | 5 | 3 | 14 | 24 | 40 | −16 | 18 | |
| 12 | Tacuary | 22 | 1 | 8 | 13 | 15 | 39 | −24 | 11 | |

Updated to match(es) played on July 8, 2012. Source: APF
Rules for classification: 1st points. If two teams are tied on points, a playoff game will be held to break the tie. If more than two clubs are tied on points, the following will be used as a tiebreaker: 1st goal difference; 2nd goals scored; 3rd away-goals scored; 4th draw of lots

=== Results ===
| Home \ Away | CEP | CPF | GUA | IND | LIB | NAC | OLI | RÑU | SOL | SCA | SPL | TAC |
|---|---|---|---|---|---|---|---|---|---|---|---|---|
| Cerro Porteño | | 1–0 | 1–0 | 1–2 | 1–0 | 2–1 | 0–1 | 5–3 | 2–0 | 1–0 | 3–0 | 2–0 |
| Cerro Porteño (PF) | 1–2 | | 2–1 | 1–1 | 0–2 | 5–0 | 0–0 | 3–1 | 1–1 | 1–0 | 0–1 | 2–1 |
| Guarani | 0–1 | 0–0 | | 3–1 | 2–3 | 1–3 | 0–1 | 1–0 | 2–1 | 2–1 | 3–1 | 4–0 |
| Independiente | 1–4 | 1–1 | 0–1 | | 1–4 | 2–5 | 3–0 | 1–0 | 2–4 | 1–1 | 1–1 | 2–1 |
| Libertad | 2–1 | 2–0 | 2–2 | 1–1 | | 1–0 | 0–1 | 1–0 | 0–1 | 1–1 | 1–0 | 2–1 |
| Nacional | 2–0 | 2–1 | 1–1 | 5–0 | 1–2 | | 0–0 | 0–2 | 2–1 | 3–1 | 2–1 | 2–0 |
| Olimpia | 1–2 | 3–3 | 2–0 | 1–1 | 2–1 | 2–1 | | 1–0 | 1–0 | 3–2 | 2–1 | 2–1 |
| Rubio Ñu | 2–3 | 1–2 | 2–1 | 2–1 | 1–5 | 3–3 | 2–3 | | 0–3 | 1–2 | 0–0 | 1–0 |
| Sol de América | 2–2 | 4–1 | 0–1 | 1–2 | 0–3 | 3–2 | 0–1 | 2–0 | | 1–0 | 2–3 | 2–0 |
| Sportivo Carapeguá | 1–2 | 1–2 | 0–0 | 3–0 | 2–2 | 2–1 | 1–2 | 2–1 | 0–2 | | 0–0 | 1–1 |
| Sportivo Luqueño | 2–0 | 3–0 | 2–2 | 1–3 | 0–4 | 2–1 | 2–1 | 1–1 | 0–2 | 1–1 | | 1–1 |
| Tacuary | 2–4 | 1–0 | 1–1 | 1–1 | 1–1 | 0–3 | 0–0 | 0–1 | 2–6 | 1–1 | 0–0 | |

Updated to match(es) played on 8 July 2012. Source:
Legend: Blue = home team win; Yellow = draw; Red = away team win.

Copa TIGO-VISION BANCO
2012 Apertura champion
Cerro Porteño
29th title

== Torneo Clausura ==
The Campeonato de Clausura, also the Copa TIGO-Visión Banco for sponsorship reasons, was the 107º official championship of the Primera División, called "Centenario Club Cerro Porteñi, and was the second championship of the 2012 season. It began on July 28 and ended on December 16.

=== Standings ===
| Pos | Team | Pld | W | D | L | GF | GA | GD | Pts | Qualification or relegation |
|---|---|---|---|---|---|---|---|---|---|---|
| 1 | Libertad | 22 | 13 | 8 | 1 | 44 | 16 | +28 | 47 | 2013 Copa Libertadores Second Stage and 2013 Copa Sudamericana First Stage |
| 2 | Nacional | 22 | 14 | 2 | 6 | 36 | 16 | +20 | 44 | |
| 3 | Guaraní | 22 | 13 | 4 | 5 | 28 | 19 | +9 | 43 | |
| 4 | Cerro Porteño | 22 | 10 | 7 | 5 | 39 | 21 | +18 | 37 | |
| 5 | Sportivo Luqueño | 22 | 9 | 6 | 7 | 23 | 24 | −1 | 33 | |
| 6 | Olimpia | 22 | 8 | 8 | 6 | 33 | 31 | +2 | 32 | |
| 7 | Cerro Porteño (PF) | 22 | 7 | 5 | 10 | 19 | 31 | −12 | 26 | |
| 8 | Sportivo Carapeguá | 22 | 7 | 4 | 11 | 30 | 34 | −4 | 25 | |
| 9 | Sol de América | 22 | 4 | 10 | 8 | 22 | 29 | −7 | 22 | |
| 10 | Tacuary | 22 | 6 | 4 | 12 | 31 | 39 | −8 | 22 | |
| 11 | Rubio Ñu | 22 | 4 | 6 | 12 | 18 | 38 | −20 | 18 | |
| 12 | Independiente | 22 | 1 | 6 | 15 | 14 | 44 | −30 | 9 | |

Updated to match(es) played on 16 December 2012. Source: APF
Rules for classification: 1st points. If two teams are tied on points, a playoff game will be held to break the tie. If more than two clubs are tied on points, the following will be used as a tiebreaker: 1st goal difference; 2nd goals scored; 3rd away-goals scored; 4th draw of lots

=== Results ===
| Home \ Away | CEP | CPF | GUA | IND | LIB | NAC | OLI | RÑU | SOL | SCA | SPL | TAC |
|---|---|---|---|---|---|---|---|---|---|---|---|---|
| Cerro Porteño | | 2–2 | 1–2 | 2–0 | 3–3 | 1–1 | 4–1 | 3–0 | 2–3 | 1–0 | 1–1 | 5–1 |
| Cerro Porteño (PF) | 0–5 | | 1–0 | 1–1 | 0–1 | 2–3 | 2–2 | 1–0 | 0–1 | 1–0 | 0–1 | 2–0 |
| Guarani | 2–1 | 1–0 | | 3–1 | 0–2 | 0–1 | 2–1 | 2–0 | 3–2 | 2–1 | 1–0 | 2–0 |
| Independiente | 0–1 | 2–1 | 1–1 | | 0–5 | 0–3 | 1–1 | 2–2 | 1–1 | 0–1 | 0–1 | 0–2 |
| Libertad | 1–0 | 3–0 | 0–0 | 3–0 | | 1–0 | 1–1 | 3–0 | 1–1 | 2–1 | 2–0 | 2–2 |
| Nacional | 0–1 | 3–0 | 1–2 | 5–1 | 1–2 | | 4–1 | 2–0 | 1–0 | 2–0 | 0–0 | 2–0 |
| Olimpia | 0–0 | 0–0 | 0–1 | 3–1 | 2–2 | 1–0 | | 3–2 | 1–0 | 3–0 | 2–0 | 2–2 |
| Rubio Ñu | 1–2 | 0–0 | 1–0 | 1–0 | 2–7 | 0–1 | 0–3 | | 0–0 | 1–1 | 1–1 | 3–1 |
| Sol de América | 2–1 | 0–2 | 1–1 | 1–1 | 0–0 | 2–0 | 1–1 | 1–1 | | 1–3 | 2–2 | 3–1 |
| Sportivo Carapeguá | 1–1 | 1–2 | 1–2 | 2–0 | 2–0 | 1–3 | 4–1 | 2–1 | 1–1 | | 5–1 | 0–4 |
| Sportivo Luqueño | 0–0 | 1–2 | 1–1 | 1–0 | 0–2 | 1–2 | 2–1 | 2–0 | 1–0 | 3–1 | | 2–0 |
| Tacuary | 0–2 | 4–0 | 2–0 | 3–2 | 1–1 | 0–1 | 2–3 | 1–2 | 2–1 | 2–2 | 1–2 | |

Updated to match(es) played on 16 December 2012. Source:
Legend: Blue = home team win; Yellow = draw; Red = away team win.

Copa TIGO-VISION BANCO
2012 Clausura champion
Libertad
16th title

== Aggregate table ==
In 2012, Paraguay have seven slots in international cups (three in the Copa Libertadores de America and four in the Copa Sudamericana). These seven slots will be filled by five teams.

- For the 2013 Copa Libertadores, the winner of the Apertura and Clausura tournaments qualify automatically. The third representative (going into the first round play-off) is the best placed non-champion from the cumulative table of both the Apertura and Clausura.
- For the 2013 Copa Sudamericana, the champion of the Apertura and Clausura tournaments qualify automatically, with the 4th and 5th best placed teams from the Apertura and Clausura cumulatives.

| Pos | Team | Pld | W | D | L | GF | GA | GD | Pts | Qualification or relegation |
|---|---|---|---|---|---|---|---|---|---|---|
| 1 | Libertad | 44 | 26 | 13 | 5 | 84 | 35 | +49 | 91 | 2013 Copa Libertadores Second Stage and 2013 Copa Sudamericana First Stage (Note: Cerro Porteño and Libertad are qualified for the 2013 Copa Libertadores and 2013 Copa Sudamericana as the Apertura and Clausura champions respectively.) |
| 2 | Cerro Porteño | 44 | 26 | 8 | 10 | 79 | 44 | +35 | 86 | 2013 Copa Libertadores Second Stage and 2013 Copa Sudamericana First Stage |
| 3 | Olimpia | 44 | 22 | 13 | 9 | 63 | 51 | +12 | 79 | 2013 Copa Libertadores First Stage |
| 4 | Nacional | 44 | 24 | 5 | 15 | 76 | 48 | +28 | 77 | 2013 Copa Sudamericana First Stage |
| 5 | Guaraní | 44 | 21 | 10 | 13 | 56 | 44 | +12 | 73 | 2013 Copa Sudamericana First Stage |
| 6 | Sol de América | 44 | 16 | 12 | 16 | 62 | 53 | +9 | 60 | |
| 7 | Sportivo Luqueño | 44 | 15 | 14 | 15 | 46 | 54 | −8 | 59 | |
| 8 | Cerro Porteño (PF) | 44 | 14 | 11 | 19 | 45 | 60 | −15 | 53 | |
| 9 | Sportivo Carapeguá | 44 | 11 | 12 | 21 | 53 | 63 | −10 | 45 | |
| 10 | Rubio Ñu | 44 | 9 | 9 | 26 | 42 | 78 | −36 | 36 | |
| 11 | Independiente | 44 | 7 | 13 | 24 | 42 | 86 | −44 | 34 | |
| 12 | Tacuary | 44 | 7 | 12 | 25 | 46 | 78 | −32 | 33 | |

Updated to match(es) played on 16 December 2012. Source:
Rules for classification: 1st points. If two teams are tied on points, a playoff game will be held to break the tie. If more than two clubs are tied on points, the following will be used as a tiebreaker: 1st goal difference; 2nd goals scored; 3rd away-goals scored; 4th draw of lots

== Relegation ==
Relegations is determined at the end of the season by computing an average (Spanish: promedio) of the number of points earned per game over the past three seasons. The two teams with the lowest average is relegated to the División Intermedia for the following season.

| Pos | Team | 2010 Pts | 2011 Pts | 2012 Pts | Total Pts | Total Pld | Avg | Relegation |
|---|---|---|---|---|---|---|---|---|
| 1 | Libertad | 87 | 79 | 91 | 257 | 132 | 1.947 | |
| 2 | Cerro Porteño | 91 | 67 | 86 | 244 | 132 | 1.8485 | |
| 3 | Olimpia | 71 | 88 | 79 | 238 | 132 | 1.803 | |
| 4 | Nacional | 77 | 83 | 77 | 237 | 132 | 1.7955 | |
| 5 | Guaraní | 85 | 58 | 73 | 216 | 132 | 1.6364 | |
| 6 | Rubio Ñu | 66 | 56 | 36 | 160 | 132 | 1.2121 | |
| 7 | Cerro Porteño (PF) | – | – | 53 | 53 | 44 | 1.2045 | |
| 8 | Sol de América | 45 | 49 | 60 | 154 | 132 | 1.1667 | |
| 9 | Sportivo Luqueño | 42 | 35 | 59 | 136 | 132 | 1.0303 | |
| 10 | Sportivo Carapeguá | – | – | 45 | 45 | 44 | 1.0227 | |
| 11 | Tacuary | 37 | 60 | 33 | 130 | 132 | 0.9848 | Relegated to the División Intermedia |
| 12 | Independiente | – | 52 | 34 | 86 | 88 | 0.9773 | Relegated to the División Intermedia |

Last updated: 16 December 2012.

== See also ==
- 2012 in Paraguayan football
