= Martín Tenemás =

Peruvian footballer (born 1985)

Personal information
- Full name: Javier Martín Tenemás Gutiérrez
- Date of birth: July 19, 1985 (age 41)
- Place of birth: Ica, Peru
- Height: 1.70 m (5 ft 7 in)
- Position: Right back

Youth career
- Deportivo Municipal

Senior career*
Years	Team	Apps	(Gls)
2004	Alianza Lima	0	(0)
2005	Atlético Universidad	18	(1)
2005	Alianza Lima	2	(0)
2006–2007	Alianza Atlético	79	(8)
2008	Alianza Lima	19	(0)
2009	Total Chalaco	6	(0)
2009–2010	Inti Gas	40	(2)
2011	Juan Aurich	4	(0)
2011	Alianza Atlético	13	(2)
2012	Univ. César Vallejo	9	(0)
2013	Cerro Porteño PF		
2013	Defensor San Alejandro		
2014	Alianza Universidad	12	(0)

International career
2005	Peru	1	(0)
- * Club domestic league appearances and goals

Javier Martín Tenemás Gutiérrez (born July 19, 1985) is a Peruvian former professional footballer who played as a right back.

== Club career ==
Tenemás was born in Ica. He has previously played for Alianza Lima, Total Chalaco, Inti Gas Deportes, Club Juan Aurich, Alianza Atlético and Univ. César Vallejo.

== International career ==
While playing for Atlético Universidad, he made his debut for the Peru national team on May 22, 2005 in the 2005 Kirin Cup against Japan. He was given his debut by former manager Freddy Ternero and was later substituted by Miguel Cevasco in the 61st minute of the match, which finished in a 1–0 victory for Peru.
