= Hugo Notario =

Argentine-born Paraguayan footballer

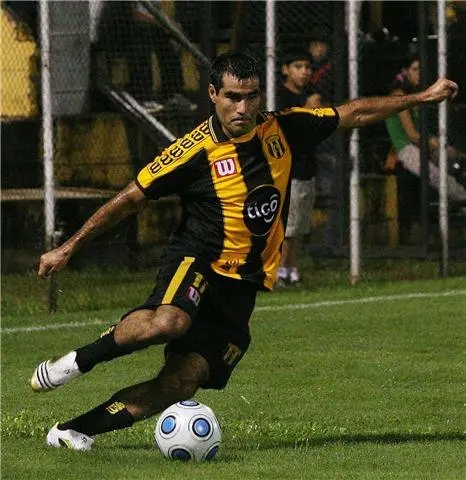

Personal information
- Full name: Hugo César Notario
- Date of birth: 15 March 1980 (age 46)
- Place of birth: Posadas, Argentina
- Height: 1.70 m (5 ft 7 in)
- Position: Striker

Youth career
- 2001–2002: Cerro Porteño

Senior career*
Years	Team	Apps	(Gls)
2003–2005	Club Sport Colombia	28	(2)
2005–2008	12 de Octubre	111	(15)
2009	Universidad de Chile	8	(0)
2009–2011	Guaraní	36	(7)
2012	General Caballero	28	(4)
2013–2014	Sol de América		
2014	Sarmiento Resistencia	8	(0)
- * Club domestic league appearances and goals as of 26 October 2014

Hugo César Notario (born 15 March 1980) is an Argentine former professional footballer who played as a forward.

He spent much of his career in Paraguay, representing Sport Colombia, 12 de Octubre, Guaraní and General Caballero, and also played in Chile for Universidad de Chile.

== Club career ==
Notario began playing football in his native Formosa Province before moving to Paraguay, where he joined Sport Colombia in 2004 and made his professional debut in the Paraguayan Primera División.

In June 2005, he moved to 12 de Octubre, initially under a verbal agreement before signing a professional contract in 2006. He remained with the Itauguá club through 2008, becoming a regular member of the first team.

=== Universidad de Chile ===
At the end of 2008, Notario signed for Chilean club Universidad de Chile, joining the squad coached by Sergio Markarián. He made his official debut during the club's 2009 Copa Libertadores campaign and was subsequently given opportunities in the domestic championship. Markarián publicly backed the forward during the early part of the season despite criticism of his performances.

Notario made eight appearances in the 2009 Apertura, without scoring. His most notable contribution came in the Clásico Universitario against Universidad Católica, when he assisted Nicolás Larrondo for the only goal of a 1–0 victory. He left Universidad de Chile after six months, although he was part of the squad that won the Apertura championship.

=== Return to Paraguay ===
Later in 2009, Notario returned to Paraguay and joined Guaraní. He was part of the side that won the 2010 Apertura, ending a six-and-a-half-year wait for a league title. He also appeared for Guaraní in the 2010 Copa Sudamericana, including the tie against Chilean club Unión San Felipe.

After leaving Guaraní, Notario continued in Paraguay with Sport Colombia and General Caballero. He later returned to Argentina, playing for Sol de América de Formosa and Sarmiento de Resistencia, among other clubs in regional and federal competitions. He also had a later spell with 12 de Octubre before finishing his career with clubs in Clorinda, including Juventud and Talleres.

Notario formally ended his playing career in 2019, with a farewell match held in Formosa.

== Honours ==
=== Club ===
Universidad de Chile

- Primera División de Chile (1): 2009 Apertura

Guaraní

- Paraguayan Primera División (1): 2010 Apertura
