= Christian Ovelar =

Paraguayan footballer (born 1985)

Personal information
- Full name: Christian Gilberto Ovelar Rodríguez
- Date of birth: 18 January 1985 (age 41)
- Place of birth: Ciudad del Este, Paraguay
- Height: 1.85 m (6 ft 1 in)
- Position: Forward

Team information
- Current team: Deportivo Capiatá

Youth career
- 1999–2003: Cerro Porteño PF

Senior career*
Years	Team	Apps	(Gls)
2003–2007	Cerro Porteño PF	79	(22)
2008–2009	Sol de América	47	(15)
2009	Jorge Wilstermann	11	(1)
2010	Sol de América	29	(6)
2011	Santiago Morning	6	(0)
2011	Sol de América	16	(8)
2012	Olaria	2	(0)
2012	Sportivo Luqueño	10	(0)
2013	Cerro Porteño PF	11	(2)
2013–2014	Sol de América	42	(25)
2014–2015	Olimpia Asunción	34	(15)
2015	Sol de América	6	(1)
2016	Millonarios	3	(1)
2016–2017	Sportivo Luqueño	6	(1)
2017	3 de Febrero		
2017–	Deportivo Capiatá	1	(0)

International career
2014	Paraguay	3	(0)
- * Club domestic league appearances and goals as of 22 August 2017

Christian Gilberto Ovelar Rodríguez (born 18 January 1985) is a Paraguayan footballer who plays for Deportivo Capiatá.

== Personal life ==
His cousins Luis and Roberto also are footballers.
