= Estadio Ovetenses Unidos =

Football stadium in Paraguay

Coordinates: 25.503935°S 56.453779°W

The Estadio Ovetense Unidos is a football stadium in Coronel Oviedo, Paraguay. Its actual capacity is for 10,000 but it is projected to expand to 50,000.

== History ==
In August 2010, the construction of the stadium began. In September 2013, the stadium was closed. In August 2014, the stadium was officially habilitated.

In September 2013, former tennis player and Paraguay's Minister of Sport Víctor Pecci assured ABC Color that he had an order by the country's president to convert the Estadio Ovetenses Unidos into a 50, 000 capacity venue.

In July 2020, Tigo Sports announced that the renovation and remodelling of the stadium was projected, which was made official by the Secretaria Nacional de Deportes.

By December 2020, the remodelling of the stadium began.
