= Miguel Godoy (footballer) =

Paraguayan footballer (born 1983)

Personal information
- Full name: Miguel Ángel Godoy Melgarejo
- Date of birth: 7 May 1983 (age 43)
- Place of birth: Paraguay
- Height: 1.76 m (5 ft 9 in)
- Position: Midfielder

Team information
- Current team: Sportivo Luqueño
- Number: 19

Senior career*
Years	Team	Apps	(Gls)
2005–2013	Cerro Porteño PF		
2014	Deportivo Capiatá	4	(0)
2014–2015	Sportivo Luqueño	53	(3)
2016	Deportivo Cali	4	(0)
2016–	Sportivo Luqueño	58	(2)
- * Club domestic league appearances and goals as of 21 April 2018

Miguel Godoy (born 7 May 1983) is a Paraguayan professional footballer who plays as a midfielder for the Paraguayan club Sportivo Luqueño.
