= 2012 in Paraguayan football =

The 2012 season is the 102nd season of competitive football in Paraguay.

== Transfers ==
- List of transfers during the 2012 season registered under the Asociación Paraguaya de Fútbol.

== National team ==
=== Friendly matches ===
February 15 Friendly	Paraguay	2 – 0	Chile	Luque, Paraguay
20:30 UTC-03	Edgar Benítez 45' (pen.); José Ortigoza 72'	(Report)		Stadium: Estadio Feliciano Cáceres; Attendance: 5,606; Referee: Leandro Vuaden (Brazil)

February 22 Friendly	Paraguay	2 – 1	Guatemala	Luque, Paraguay
20:30 UTC-3	E.Benítez 33'; A. Bogado 73' (pen.)		C. Ruiz 81'	Stadium: Estadio Feliciano Cáceres; Attendance: 8.000

February 29 Friendly	Paraguay	1 – 0	Panama	Asunción, Paraguay
20:30 UTC-3	J. Santana 88'			Stadium: Estadio General Pablo Rojas

April 25 Friendly	Guatemala	0 – 1	Paraguay	Guatemala City, Guatemala
20:30 UTC-3			Mazazotte 7'	Stadium: Estadio Mateo Flores

August 15 Friendly	Guatemala	3 – 3	Paraguay	Washington, D.C., United States
18:15 UTC-4	Pappa 7'; León 30'; Ruiz 84'	(Report)	Cardozo 1'; Fabbro 53'; Pérez 63'	Stadium: RFK Stadium; Referee: Baldomero Toledo (United States)

November 14 Friendly	Paraguay	3 – 1	Guatemala	Luque, Paraguay
				Stadium: Estadio Feliciano Caceres

=== 2014 FIFA World Cup qualification ===
June 9 2014 WCQ	Bolivia	3 – 1	Paraguay	La Paz, Bolivia
16:00 UTC-4	Peña 9'; Escobar 69, 80'	Report	Riveros 81'	Stadium: Estadio Hernando Siles; Attendance: 17,320; Referee: Roberto Silvera

September 7 2014 WCQ	Argentina	3 – 1	Paraguay	Córdoba, Argentina
				Stadium: Estadio Mario Alberto Kempes

September 11 2014 WCQ	Paraguay	0 – 2	Venezuela	Asunción, Paraguay
				Stadium: Estadio Defensores del Chaco

October 12 2014 WCQ	Colombia	2 – 0	Paraguay	Barranquilla, Colombia
				Stadium: Estadio Metropolitano Roberto Meléndez

October 16 2014 WCQ	Paraguay	1 – 0	Peru	Asunción, Paraguay
				Stadium: Estadio Defensores del Chaco

Win Draw Loss
