= Jorge González (Paraguayan footballer) =

Paraguayan footballer (born 1988)

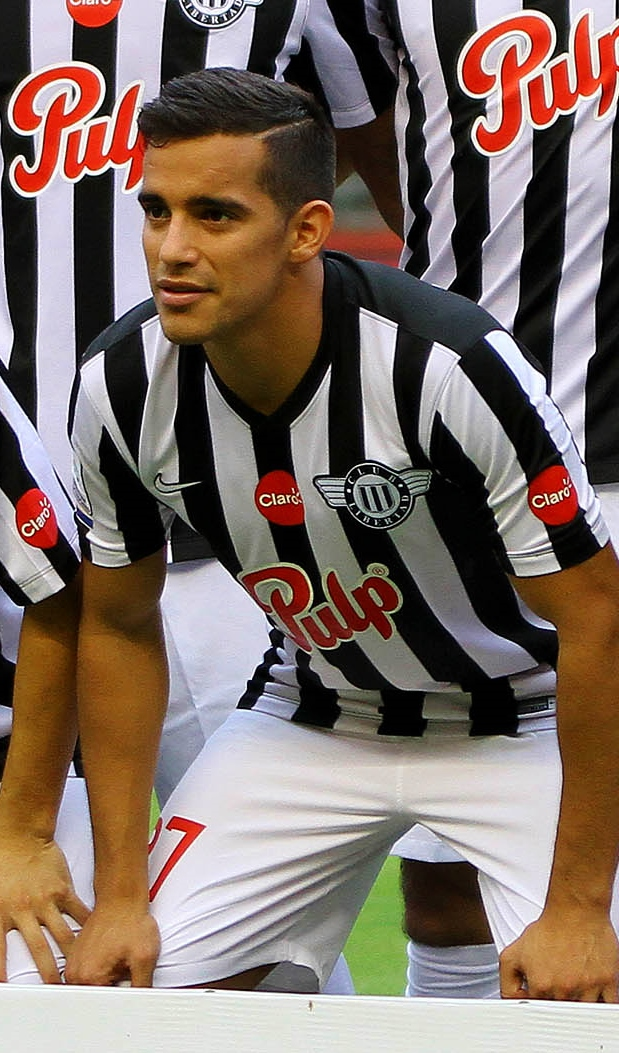
- González in 2015

Personal information
- Full name: Jorge Daniel González Marquet
- Date of birth: 25 March 1988 (age 38)
- Place of birth: Presidente Franco District, Paraguay
- Height: 1.80 m (5 ft 11 in)
- Position: Midfielder

Team information
- Current team: General Díaz
- Number: 27

Youth career
- 2001–2005: Libertad

Senior career*
Years	Team	Apps	(Gls)
2006–2008	Libertad	18	(0)
2009	Tacuary	10	(0)
2009	Rubio Ñu	10	(0)
2010–2015	Libertad	161	(25)
2016–2017	Cerro Porteño	23	(4)
2018–2019	Paraná	17	(0)
2020–	General Díaz	1	(0)

International career
2007	Paraguay U-20	7	(1)
- * Club domestic league appearances and goals as of 19:37, 21 June 2020 (UTC)

Jorge Daniel González Marquet (born 25 March 1988) is a Paraguayan professional footballer who plays as midfielder for General Díaz.

== Career ==
Raúl made his professional debut with Libertad in 2006 then play with Tacuary, Rubio Ñu back in Libertad and since 2016 in Cerro Porteño.
