= 2014 in Paraguayan football =

The 2014 season is the 104th season of competitive football in Paraguay.

== Transfers ==
- List of transfers during the 2014 season registered under the Asociación Paraguaya de Fútbol.

== National team ==
March 5, 2014 Friendly	Costa Rica	2 – 1	Paraguay	San José, Costa Rica
	Joel Campbell 42'; Álvaro Saborío 72'	Report	Gustavo Raul Gómez 85'	Stadium: Estadio Nacional; Referee: Armando Castro (Honduras)

May 29, 2014 Friendly	Cameroon	1 – 2	Paraguay	Kufstein, Austria
	Eric Maxim Choupo-Moting 75'	Report	Óscar Romero 4'; Roque Santa Cruz 68'	Stadium: Kufstein Arena; Referee: Manuel Schüttengruber (Austria)

June 1, 2014 Friendly	France	1 – 1	Paraguay	Nice, France
	Antoine Griezmann 82'	Report	Víctor Cáceres 89'	Stadium: Allianz Riviera; Referee: Carlos Clos Gómez (Spain)

7 September 2014 Friendly	United Arab Emirates	0 – 0	Paraguay	Villach, Austria
		Report		Stadium: TBA

10 October 2014 Friendly	South Korea	2 – 0	Paraguay	Cheonan, South Korea
		Report		Stadium: Cheonan Stadium

14 October 2014 Friendly	China	2 – 1	Paraguay	Changsha, China
		Report		Stadium: Helong Stadium

14 November 2014 Friendly	Paraguay	2 – 1	Peru	Luque, Paraguay
	Á. Romero 70'; González 90+2' (pen.)	Report	Guerrero 74'	Stadium: Estadio Feliciano Caceres; Referee: Ricardo Marques Ribeiro (Brazil)

18 November 2014 Friendly	Peru	2 – 1	Paraguay	Lima, Peru
	Ascues 73', 81'	Report	Santa Cruz 42'	Stadium: Estadio Nacional; Referee: Wilmar Roldán (Colombia)

Win Draw Loss
