= 2014 APF División de Honor =

Primera División
- Season: 2014
- Champions: Apertura: Libertad (17th title); Clausura: Libertad (18th title)
- Relegated: 3 de Febrero; 12 de Octubre
- Copa Libertadores: Libertad; Guaraní; Cerro Porteño
- Copa Sudamericana: Nacional; Olimpia; Sportivo Luqueño
- Matches: 264
- Goals: 726 (2.75 per match)
- Top goalscorer: Apertura: (Uruguay) Hernán Rodrigo López (Paraguay) Christian Ovelar (19 goals); Clausura: (Paraguay) Fernando Fernández (17 goals)

The 2014 División Profesional season (officially the 2014 Copa TIGO- Visión Banco for sponsorship reasons) was the 80th season of top-flight professional football in Paraguay.

== Teams ==
Locations of the 2014 Primera División teams

Team	Home city	Stadium	Capacity
3 de Febrero	Ciudad del Este	Antonio Oddone Sarubbi	28,000
12 de Octubre	Itauguá	Juan Canuto Pettengill	8,000
Cerro Porteño	Asunción	General Pablo Rojas	32,000
Deportivo Capiatá	Capiatá	Capiatá	6,000
Guaraní	Asunción	Rogelio Livieres	6,000
General Díaz	Luque	General Adrián Jara	3,500
Libertad	Asunción	Dr. Nicolás Leoz	10,000
Nacional	Asunción	Arsenio Erico	4,000
Olimpia	Asunción	Manuel Ferreira	15,000
Rubio Ñu	Asunción	La Arboleda	5,000
Sol de América	Villa Elisa	Luis Alfonso Giagni	5,000
Sportivo Luqueño	Luque	Feliciano Cáceres	25,000

== Torneo Apertura ==
The Campeonato de Apertura, also the Copa TIGO-Visión Banco for sponsorship reasons, was the 110º official championship of the Primera División, called "Dr. Nicolás Leoz, Centenario del club 12 de Octubre", and is the first championship of the 2014 season. It began on February 14 and will end on June 29.

=== Standings ===
Pos	Team	Pld	W	D	L	GF	GA	GD	Pts	Qualification or relegation
1	Libertad	22	15	5	2	41	17	+24	50	2015 Copa Libertadores Second Stage
2	Guaraní	22	14	4	4	56	31	+25	46	
3	Olimpia	22	9	6	7	32	26	+6	33	
4	Cerro Porteño	22	8	7	7	49	38	+11	31	
5	Sol de América	22	7	10	5	36	31	+5	31	
6	Rubio Ñu	22	8	6	8	38	37	+1	30	
7	Nacional	22	8	6	8	26	27	−1	30	
8	Sportivo Luqueño	22	6	10	6	23	25	−2	28	
9	Deportivo Capiatá	22	6	8	8	22	37	−15	26	
10	General Díaz	22	4	7	11	19	34	−15	19	
11	12 de Octubre	22	2	9	11	21	38	−17	15	
12	3 de Febrero	22	2	8	12	22	44	−22	14	

Updated to match(es) played on June 19, 2014. Source: APF
Rules for classification: 1st points. If two teams are tied on points, a playoff game will be held to break the tie. If more than two clubs are tied on points, the following will be used as a tiebreaker: 1st goal difference; 2nd goals scored; 3rd away-goals scored; 4th draw of lots

=== Results ===
Home \ Away	3DF	12O	CER	CAP	GDI	GUA	LIB	NAC	OLI	RÑU	SOL	SPL
3 de Febrero		3–2	1–1	0–0	1–1	0–2	0–2	0–2	1–5	1–1	0–1	0–2
12 de Octubre	1–1		1–3	0–2	1–1	2–2	1–2	1–1	1–1	0–3	0–3	1–1
Cerro Porteño	2–1	4–1		7–0	2–1	5–5	4–0	0–1	2–2	1–4	6–3	0–0
Deportivo Capiatá	2–2	2–2	1–0		1–0	0–2	1–5	2–1	2–0	4–0	0–0	1–1
General Díaz	2–3	1–0	1–1	1–1		3–1	0–1	2–0	1–3	1–1	2–1	0–1
Guaraní	2–1	2–1	3–0	6–0	2–0		2–4	0–4	2–1	2–2	3–1	1–0
Libertad	4–1	1–0	3–1	0–0	5–0	2–0		1–0	1–0	3–1	0–0	3–2
Nacional	0–0	1–0	2–1	3–1	0–0	2–6	1–1		0–2	0–1	2–1	3–0
Olimpia	3–2	1–1	0–2	2–1	1–0	1–1	2–1	2–0		3–0	1–1	1–1
Rubio Ñu	5–1	1–2	3–3	1–0	4–0	1–4	0–1	4–1	2–1		0–2	1–4
Sol de América	1–1	1–1	4–4	3–0	4–2	0–4	1–1	1–1	3–0	2–2		0–0
Sportivo Luqueño	3–2	1–2	1–0	1–1	0–0	1–4	0–0	1–1	1–0	1–1	1–3	

Updated to match(es) played on 19 Jun 2014. Source: Soccerway
Legend: Blue = home team win; Yellow = draw; Red = away team win.

=== Top scorers ===
Rank	Player	Team	Goals
1	(Uruguay) Hernán Rodrigo López	Libertad	19 (5)
1	(Paraguay) Christian Ovelar	Sol de América	19 (6)
3	(Paraguay) Jorge Benítez	Guaraní	17
4	(Paraguay) Fernando Fernández	Guaraní	14

Source: Soccerway

== Torneo Clausura ==
The Campeonato de Clausura, also the Copa TIGO-Visión Banco for sponsorship reasons, will be the 111º official championship of the Primera División, and was the second championship of the 2014 season.

=== Standings ===
Pos	Team	Pld	W	D	L	GF	GA	GD	Pts	Qualification or relegation
1	Libertad	22	14	4	4	41	18	+23	46	2015 Copa Libertadores Second Stage
2	Cerro Porteño	22	13	5	4	43	20	+23	44	
3	Guaraní	22	12	5	5	49	29	+20	41	
4	Sportivo Luqueño	22	9	8	5	24	23	+1	35	
5	Nacional	22	9	5	8	18	19	−1	32	
6	Olimpia	22	8	6	8	28	24	+4	30	
7	General Díaz	22	8	5	9	26	33	−7	29	
8	3 de Febrero	22	7	4	11	22	35	−13	25	
9	Sol de América	22	6	6	10	24	32	−8	24	
10	Deportivo Capiatá	22	5	6	11	22	34	−12	21	
11	Rubio Ñú	22	4	8	10	21	33	−12	20	
12	12 de Octubre	22	4	4	14	23	41	−18	16	

Updated to match(es) played on 6 December 2014. Source: APF
Rules for classification: 1st points. If two teams are tied on points, a playoff game will be held to break the tie. If more than two clubs are tied on points, the following will be used as a tiebreaker: 1st goal difference; 2nd goals scored; 3rd away-goals scored; 4th draw of lots

=== Results ===
Home \ Away	3DF	12O	CER	CAP	GDI	GUA	LIB	NAC	OLI	RÑU	SOL	SPL
3 de Febrero		0–2	0–5	2–1	2–1	0–4	2–0	2–1	1–3	0–0	1–1	0–1
12 de Octubre	1–1		0–2	2–3	3–2	1–1	0–2	1–1	2–1	1–4	2–4	0–1
Cerro Porteño	2–0	4–2		1–0	3–1	1–4	2–2	1–0	1–1	1–1	2–0	4–0
Deportivo Capiatá	2–3	0–0	1–1		1–1	1–0	1–0	2–3	0–3	2–0	1–1	1–3
General Díaz	1–0	1–0	3–2	2–0		1–1	0–1	0–1	1–1	2–1	1–0	1–2
Guaraní	2–3	2–1	3–4	4–1	4–2		5–1	0–0	4–2	0–0	3–0	2–0
Libertad	1–1	2–0	0–0	2–1	6–0	4–1		0–0	3–1	5–1	3–0	1–0
Nacional	1–0	1–0	0–1	0–3	2–0	0–1	0–1		0–2	2–1	0–0	2–1
Olimpia	0–1	2–0	1–0	2–0	1–3	1–2	0–1	0–1		0–0	1–1	1–1
Rubio Ñu	1–0	3–1	0–4	3–0	1–1	1–3	0–3	1–2	0–2		1–1	2–2
Sol de América	3–2	2–3	0–2	1–1	0–1	3–1	2–3	1–0	1–2	1–0		2–0
Sportivo Luqueño	2–1	2–1	1–0	0–0	1–1	2–2	1–0	1–1	1–1	0–0	2–0	

Updated to match(es) played on 6 December 2014. Source: Soccerway
Legend: Blue = home team win; Yellow = draw; Red = away team win.

=== Top scorers ===
Rank	Player	Team	Goals
1	(Paraguay) Fernando Fernández	Guaraní	17
2	(Paraguay) Federico Santander	Guaraní	11
3	(Paraguay) José María Ortigoza	Cerro Porteño	10 (1)

== Aggregate table ==
In 2014, Paraguay have seven slots in international cups (three in the Copa Libertadores de America and four in the Copa Sudamericana). These seven slots will be filled by five teams.

- For the 2015 Copa Libertadores, the champions of the Apertura and Clausura tournaments qualify automatically. The third representative (going into the first round play-off) is the best placed non-champion from the cumulative table of both the Apertura and Clausura.
- For the 2015 Copa Sudamericana, the champion (Apertura or Clausura) with the better Apertura and Clausura cumulatives qualify, with the 4th, 5th, 6th best placed teams from the Apertura and Clausura cumulatives.

Pos	Team	Pld	W	D	L	GF	GA	GD	Pts	Qualification or relegation
1	Libertad	44	29	9	6	82	35	+47	96	2015 Copa Libertadores Second Stage and 2015 Copa Sudamericana First Stage
2	Guaraní	44	26	9	9	105	60	+45	87	2015 Copa Libertadores Second Stage (Note: As Libertad won both the Apertura and Clausura, Guaraní qualified for the Copa Libertadores second stage, and Cerro Porteño qualified for the Copa Libertadores first stage.)
3	Cerro Porteño	44	21	12	11	91	58	+33	75	2015 Copa Libertadores First Stage
4	Sportivo Luqueño	44	15	18	11	47	48	−1	63 (Note: Positions decided by draw, as both clubs agreed to not play the extra playoff game.)	2015 Copa Sudamericana First Stage
5	Olimpia	44	17	12	15	60	50	+10	63	2015 Copa Sudamericana First Stage
6	Nacional	44	17	11	16	44	46	−2	62	2015 Copa Sudamericana First Stage
7	Sol de América	44	13	16	15	60	63	−3	55	
8	Rubio Ñú	44	12	14	18	59	70	−11	50	
9	General Díaz	44	12	12	20	45	67	−22	48	
10	Deportivo Capiatá	44	11	14	19	44	71	−27	47	
11	3 de Febrero	44	9	12	23	44	79	−35	39	
12	12 de Octubre	44	6	13	25	44	79	−35	31	

Updated to match(es) played on December 2014. Source:
Rules for classification: 1st points. If two teams are tied on points, a playoff game will be held to break the tie. If more than two clubs are tied on points, the following will be used as a tiebreaker: 1st goal difference; 2nd goals scored; 3rd away-goals scored; 4th draw of lots

== Relegation ==
Relegations is determined at the end of the season by computing an average of the number of points earned per game over the past three seasons. The two teams with the lowest average are relegated to the División Intermedia for the following season.

Pos	Team	2012 Pts	2013 Pts	2014 Pts	Total Pts	Total Pld	Avg	Relegation
1	Libertad	91	75	96	262	132	1.9848	
2	Cerro Porteño	86	87	75	248	132	1.8788	
3	Guaraní	73	77	87	237	132	1.7955	
4	Nacional	77	79	62	218	132	1.6515	
5	Olimpia	79	55	63	197	132	1.4924	
6	Sportivo Luqueño	59	54	63	176	132	1.3333	
7	Deportivo Capiatá	—	65	47	111	88	1.2614	
8	General Díaz	—	61	48	109	88	1.2386	
9	Sol de América	60	46	55	161	132	1.2197	
10	Rubio Ñu	36	50	50	136	132	1.0303	
11	3 de Febrero	—	—	39	39	44	0.8864	Relegated to the División Intermedia
12	12 de Octubre	—	—	31	31	44	0.7045	Relegated to the División Intermedia

Source: D10 Paraguay

== See also ==
- 2014 in Paraguayan football
