= 2013 APF División de Honor =

Primera División
- Season: 2013
- Champions: Apertura: Nacional (9th title); Clausura: Cerro Porteño (30th title)
- Relegated: Cerro Porteño (PF); Sportivo Carapeguá
- Copa Libertadores: Cerro Porteño; Nacional; Guaraní
- Copa Sudamericana: Cerro Porteño; Libertad; General Díaz; Capiatá
- Matches: 132
- Goals: 351 (2.66 per match)
- Top goalscorer: Apertura: Julián Benítez (Nacional – 13 goals); Clausura: Guillermo Beltrán (Cerro Porteño – 3 goals)

The 2013 División Profesional season (officially the 2013 Copa TIGO- Visión Banco for sponsorship reasons) was the 79th season of top-flight professional football in Paraguay.

== Teams ==
Locations of the 2013 Primera División teams

Team	Home city	Stadium	Capacity
Cerro Porteño	Asunción	General Pablo Rojas	32,000
Cerro Porteño (PF)	Presidente Franco	Juan Eudes Pereira	5,000
Deportivo Capiatá	Capiatá	Capiatá	6,000
Guaraní	Asunción	Rogelio Livieres	6,000
General Díaz	Luque	General Adrián Jara	3,500
Libertad	Asunción	Dr. Nicolás Leoz	10,000
Nacional	Asunción	Arsenio Erico	4,000
Olimpia	Asunción	Manuel Ferreira	15,000
Rubio Ñu	Asunción	La Arboleda	5,000
Sol de América	Villa Elisa	Luis Alfonso Giagni	5,000
Sportivo Carapeguá	Carapeguá	Municipal de Carapeguá	6,500
Sportivo Luqueño	Luque	Feliciano Cáceres	25,000

== Torneo Apertura ==
The Campeonato de Apertura, also the Copa TIGO-Visión Banco for sponsorship reasons, was the 108º official championship of the Primera División, called "Don Osvaldo Domínguez Dibb", and was the first championship of the 2013 season. It began on February 9 and ended on June 30.

=== Standings ===
Pos	Team	Pld	W	D	L	GF	GA	GD	Pts	Qualification or relegation
1	Nacional	22	15	1	6	40	25	+15	46	2014 Copa Libertadores Second Stage
2	Guaraní	22	11	7	4	38	21	+17	40	
3	Cerro Porteño	22	11	4	7	38	29	+9	37	
4	Libertad	22	10	6	6	29	23	+6	36	
5	Olimpia	22	8	7	7	31	31	0	31	
6	Sol de América	22	7	8	7	30	34	−4	29	
7	General Díaz	22	7	7	8	25	27	−2	28	
8	Deportivo Capiatá	22	7	6	9	25	30	−5	27	
9	Rubio Ñu	22	6	7	9	27	29	−2	25	
10	Sportivo Luqueño	22	6	7	9	19	25	−6	25	
11	Cerro Porteño (PF)	22	4	7	11	27	38	−11	19	
12	Sportivo Carapeguá	22	3	7	12	22	39	−17	16	

Updated to match(es) played on June 2013. Source: APF
Rules for classification: 1st points. If two teams are tied on points, a playoff game will be held to break the tie. If more than two clubs are tied on points, the following will be used as a tiebreaker: 1st goal difference; 2nd goals scored; 3rd away-goals scored; 4th draw of lots

=== Results ===
Home \ Away	CER	CPF	CAP	GDI	GUA	LIB	NAC	OLI	RÑU	SOL	SCA	SPL
Cerro Porteño		4–2	0–1	3–2	2–1	3–1	1–4	1–1	2–2	4–0	3–0	0–0
Cerro Porteño (PF)	1–3		1–0	1–3	0–0	2–3	5–2	1–2	1–2	1–1	2–2	2–1
Deportivo Capiatá	0–2	2–1		1–1	0–5	0–0	0–1	1–1	3–4	1–1	2–0	1–0
General Díaz	2–3	1–1	2–1		1–1	1–1	1–3	0–1	1–1	2–0	1–0	1–0
Guaraní	2–0	2–1	1–1	0–1		1–1	0–0	1–2	2–4	2–1	2–1	4–1
Libertad	1–0	1–1	2–1	2–0	1–2		0–1	0–0	2–1	2–1	2–0	0–2
Nacional	0–2	4–1	2–1	1–0	0–2	1–0		3–0	1–0	3–2	4–3	0–1
Olimpia	1–0	2–0	2–3	0–1	2–3	2–1	2–3		1–1	1–2	3–2	4–3
Rubio Ñu	1–2	1–0	1–2	1–1	1–1	1–2	1–0	0–0		1–1	2–1	0–1
Sol de América	4–1	1–1	1–0	3–1	0–4	3–4	2–1	3–2	1–0		0–0	2–2
Sportivo Carapeguá	1–1	1–2	0–2	3–2	1–1	0–0	0–3	2–2	3–2	1–1		0–2
Sportivo Luqueño	2–1	0–0	0–1	0–0	0–1	0–3	1–3	0–0	1–0	0–0	0–1	

Updated to match(es) played on 2013. Source:
Legend: Blue = home team win; Yellow = draw; Red = away team win.

=== Attendances ===
#	Team	Total	Low	High	Average
1	Olimpia	53,004	340	18,263	4,818
2	Cerro Porteño	38,349	320	15,867	3,486
3	Capiatá	17,268	194	4,812	1,569
4	Sportivo Luqueño	16,572	300	6,858	1,506
5	Sportivo Carapeguá	15,416	246	4,145	1,401
6	Libertad	13,368	201	4,786	1,215
7	Guaraní	11,785	443	4,873	1,071
8	General Díaz	9,573	105	2,737	870
9	Cerro Porteño (PF)	9,247	128	2,311	840
10	Nacional	8,144	212	2,164	740
11	Rubio Ñu	7,549	107	2,444	686
12	Sol de América	5,336	96	2,292	485
TOTAL	Apertura	205,611	96	18,263	1,557

=== Topscorers ===
#	Player	Club	Goals
1	(Paraguay) Julián Benítez	Nacional	13
2	(Brazil) Rodrigo Teixeira	Guaraní	11
3	(Paraguay) Ángel Romero	Cerro Porteño	9

== Torneo Clausura ==
The Campeonato de Clausura, also the Copa TIGO-Visión Banco for sponsorship reasons, was the 109º official championship of the Primera División, and was the second championship of the 2013 season.

=== Standings ===
Pos	Team	Pld	W	D	L	GF	GA	GD	Pts	Qualification or relegation
1	Cerro Porteño	22	14	8	0	37	16	+21	50	2014 Copa Libertadores Second Stage
2	Libertad	22	12	3	7	25	19	+6	39	
3	Deportivo Capiatá	22	12	2	8	36	32	+4	38	
4	Guaraní	22	10	7	5	47	24	+23	37	
5	General Díaz	22	8	9	5	30	24	+6	33	
6	Nacional	22	9	6	7	30	26	+4	33	
7	Sportivo Luqueño	22	8	5	9	30	29	+1	29	
8	Rubio Ñu	22	6	7	9	25	32	−7	25	
9	Olimpia	22	6	6	10	31	32	−1	24	
10	Sportivo Carapeguá	22	5	7	10	24	38	−14	22	
11	Sol de América	22	4	5	13	24	43	−19	17	
12	Cerro Porteño (PF)	22	5	1	16	23	47	−24	16	

Updated to match(es) played on December 2013. Source: APF
Rules for classification: 1st points. If two teams are tied on points, a playoff game will be held to break the tie. If more than two clubs are tied on points, the following will be used as a tiebreaker: 1st goal difference; 2nd goals scored; 3rd away-goals scored; 4th draw of lots

=== Results ===
Home \ Away	CER	CPF	CAP	GDI	GUA	LIB	NAC	OLI	RÑU	SOL	SCA	SPL
Cerro Porteño		2–1	3–1	2–1	1–1	1–1	4–1	2–1	1–0	2–0	4–0	2–1
Cerro Porteño (PF)	1–2		0–1	3–0	1–4	2–1	1–2	2–7	3–1	3–0	2–0	0–2
Capiatá	1–1	3–1		1–1	1–0	2–0	1–0	1–0	4–0	1–0	3–1	2–0
General Díaz	1–1	4–0	0–1		1–4	1–1	0–0	1–1	2–2	1–0	1–0	2–1
Guaraní	2–3	6–0	5–3	0–3		1–0	0–1	2–0	1–1	3–0	0–0	2–2
Libertad	0–0	1–0	2–1	0–3	0–2		2–0	1–0	4–2	3–0	2–0	0–1
Nacional	0–1	1–0	3–1	2–1	2–2	0–1		1–1	0–1	1–2	5–2	0–0
Olimpia	0–0	3–1	4–0	0–1	0–5	1–2	0–1		0–2	2–2	3–1	1–1
Rubio Ñu	1–2	1–0	3–2	1–2	1–1	0–1	2–2	0–1		2–1	1–1	0–1
Sol de América	1–1	2–0	1–2	1–1	2–0	0–1	1–2	4–4	2–2		3–2	2–4
Sportivo Carapeguá	0–0	2–2	3–2	1–1	2–2	2–1	1–4	0–1	1–1	2–0		1–0
Sportivo Luqueño	1–2	2–0	4–2	2–2	0–4	0–1	2–2	2–1	0–1	4–0	0–2	

Updated to match(es) played on December 2013. Source: Futebol365
Legend: Blue = home team win; Yellow = draw; Red = away team win.

=== Attendances ===
#	Team	Total	Low	High	Average
1	Olimpia	16,871	7,218	9,653	8,435
2	Libertad	9,178	361	8,817	4,589
3	Cerro Porteño	13,756	1,912	7,508	4,585
4	Nacional	7,557	579	6,978	3,778
5	Sportivo Luqueño	2,626	2,626	2,626	2,626
6	Sportivo Carapeguá	1,711	1,711	1,711	1,711
7	Deportivo Capiatá	1,985	500	1,485	992
8	Rubio Ñu	2,548	123	2,094	849
9	Cerro Porteño (PF)	1,368	498	870	684
10	Sol de América	1,231	238	993	615
11	General Díaz	829	350	479	414
12	Guaraní	806	101	705	403
TOTAL	Clausura	60,466	101	9,653	2,519

=== Topscorers ===
#	Player	Club	Goals
1	(Uruguay) Rodrigo López	Sportivo Luqueño	17

== Aggregate table ==
In 2013, Paraguay have seven slots in international cups (three in the Copa Libertadores de America and four in the Copa Sudamericana). These seven slots will be filled by five teams.

- For the 2014 Copa Libertadores, the champions of the Apertura and Clausura tournaments qualify automatically. The third representative (going into the first round play-off) is the best placed non-champion from the cumulative table of both the Apertura and Clausura.
- For the 2014 Copa Sudamericana, the champion (Apertura or Clausura) with the better Apertura and Clausura cumulatives qualify, with the 4th, 5th, 6th best placed teams from the Apertura and Clausura cumulatives.

Pos	Team	Pld	W	D	L	GF	GA	GD	Pts	Qualification or relegation
1	Cerro Porteño	44	25	12	7	75	45	+30	87	2014 Copa Libertadores Second Stage and 2014 Copa Sudamericana First Stage
2	Nacional	44	24	7	13	70	51	+19	79	2014 Copa Libertadores Second Stage
3	Guaraní	44	21	14	9	83	45	+38	77	2014 Copa Libertadores First Stage
4	Libertad	44	22	9	13	54	42	+12	75	2014 Copa Sudamericana First Stage
5	Deportivo Capiatá	44	19	8	17	61	62	−1	65	2014 Copa Sudamericana First Stage
6	General Díaz	44	15	16	13	55	51	+4	61	2014 Copa Sudamericana First Stage
7	Olimpia	44	14	13	17	62	63	−1	55	
8	Sportivo Luqueño	44	14	12	18	49	54	−5	54	
9	Rubio Ñu	44	12	14	18	52	61	−9	50	
10	Sol de América	44	11	13	20	54	77	−23	46	
11	Sportivo Carapeguá	44	8	14	22	46	77	−31	38	
12	Cerro Porteño (PF)	44	9	8	27	50	85	−35	35	

Updated to match(es) played on December 2013. Source:
Rules for classification: 1st points. If two teams are tied on points, a playoff game will be held to break the tie. If more than two clubs are tied on points, the following will be used as a tiebreaker: 1st goal difference; 2nd goals scored; 3rd away-goals scored; 4th draw of lots

== Relegation ==
Relegations is determined at the end of the season by computing an average (Spanish: promedio) of the number of points earned per game over the past three seasons. The two teams with the lowest average is relegated to the División Intermedia for the following season.

Pos	Team	2011 Pts	2012 Pts	2013 Pts	Total Pts	Total Pld	Avg	Relegation
1	Libertad	79	91	75	245	132	1.8561	
2	Cerro Porteño	67	86	87	240	132	1.8182	
3	Nacional	83	77	79	239	132	1.8106	
4	Olimpia	88	79	55	222	132	1.6818	
5	Guaraní	58	73	77	208	132	1.5758	
6	Deportivo Capiatá	—	—	65	65	44	1.4773	
7	General Díaz	—	—	61	61	44	1.3864	
8	Sol de América	49	60	46	155	132	1.1742	
9	Sportivo Luqueño	35	59	54	148	132	1.1212	
10	Rubio Ñu	58	36	50	144	132	1.0909	
11	Cerro Porteño (PF)	—	53	35	88	88	1	Relegated to the División Intermedia
12	Sportivo Carapeguá	—	45	38	83	88	0.9432	Relegated to the División Intermedia

== See also ==
- 2013 in Paraguayan football
