= 2013 in Paraguayan football =

The 2013 season is the 103rd season of competitive football in Paraguay.

== Transfers ==
- List of transfers during the 2013 season registered under the Asociación Paraguaya de Fútbol.

== National team ==
=== Friendly matches ===
February 6 Friendly	Paraguay	3–0	El Salvador	Asunción, Paraguay
20:30 UTC-03	Pablo Aguilar 36'; Richard Ortiz 36' 61'	(Report)		Stadium: Estadio Dr. Nicolás Léoz; Referee: Ricardo Marques (BraZil)

August 14 Friendly	Germany	3–3	Paraguay	Kaiserslautern, Germany
18:45 GMT	Gündoğan 18'; Müller 31'; Bender 75'	(Report)	Núñez 9'; Pittoni 13'; Samudio 46'	Stadium: Fritz-Walter-Stadion; Attendance: 47,500; Referee: Ivan Bebek

=== 2014 FIFA World Cup qualification ===
March 22, 2013 2014 WCQ	Uruguay	1–1	Paraguay	Montevideo, Uruguay
19:00 UTC-3				Stadium: Estadio Centenario; Referee: Wilmar Roldán

March 26, 2013 2014 WCQ	Ecuador	4–1	Paraguay	Quito, Ecuador
16:00 UTC-5				Stadium: Estadio Olímpico Atahualpa; Referee: Sandro Ricci

June 7, 2013 2014 WCQ	Paraguay	1–2	Chile	Asunción, Paraguay
21:10	Riveros (yellow card) 19'; Candia (yellow card) 80'; Santa Cruz 88'	Summary	Vargas 41'; Vidal 56'; Gutiérrez (yellow card) 90'; Isla (yellow card) 90+1'	Stadium: Estadio Defensores del Chaco; Attendance: 30,000; Referee: (Brazil) Leandro Pedro Vuaden

September 6, 2013 2014 WCQ	Paraguay	4–0	Bolivia	Asunción, Paraguay
	Fabbro 17'; Santa Cruz 27'; Ortiz 81'; Gómez 85'			Stadium: Estadio Defensores del Chaco

September 10, 2013 2014 WCQ	Paraguay	2–5	Argentina	Asunción, Paraguay
	Nunez 18'; Santa Cruz 85'; Fernandez (yellow card) 11'		12' (pen.), 52' (pen.) Messi; 32' Aguero; 50' Di María; 90' Maxi Rodríguez; (yellow card) 69' Zabaleta	Stadium: Estadio Defensores del Chaco; Attendance: 27,000; Referee: Enrique Osses (Chile)

October 11, 2013 2014 WCQ	Venezuela	1–1	Paraguay	San Cristóbal, Venezuela
	Luis Seijas 82'		28' Edgar Benitez	Stadium: Estadio Polideportivo de Pueblo Nuevo; Referee: Victor Carrillo (Peru)

October 15, 2013 2014 WCQ	Paraguay	1–2	Colombia	Asunción, Paraguay
	Jorge Rojas 7'		38', 56' Mario Yepes	Stadium: Estadio Defensores del Chaco; Referee: Diego Abal (Argentina)

Win Draw Loss
