= Paranaense F.C. =

Paraguayan football club

- Full name: Paranaense Fútbol Club
- Founded: February 06, 2012
- Ground: Estadio R.I. 3 Corrales, Ciudad del Este, Paraguay
- Capacity: 5,000
- Chairman: (Paraguay) Carlos Ortega
- Manager: (Paraguay) Fermín Balbuena
- League: Paraguayan Segunda División
- Intermedia 2012: 13th
Home colours	Away colours

Paranaense Fútbol Club is a Paraguayan football (soccer) club from Ciudad del Este; founded in the day the February 6, 2012.

== History ==
The club was founded the February 6, 2012, after Liga Deportiva Paranaense won the Campeonato Nacional Interligas.
