= Estadio Roberto Bettega =

Stadium in Asunción, Paraguay

Coordinates: 25°14′10″S 57°34′07″W

Estadio Roberto Bettega is a multi-use stadium in Asunción, Paraguay. It is currently used mostly for football matches and is the home stadium of Tacuary. The stadium holds 15,000 people.
