= Club Cerro Porteño (Presidente Franco) =

Paraguayan football club

Cerro Porteño PF
- Full name: Club Cerro Porteño de Presidente Franco
- Nickname: El Ciclón del Este
- Founded: 12 August 1967
- Ground: Juan Eudes Pereira, Presidente Franco, Paraguay
- Capacity: 5,000
- Chairman: Aníbal Cáceres
- League: Primera B Nacional
- Website: http://www.cerrodefranco.com/
Home colours	Away colours

Club Cerro Porteño PF is a Paraguayan football club based in the city of Presidente Franco in the Alto Paraná Department. The club plays in the Primera B Nacional.

The club was founded 12 August 1967. Their home games are played at the Cerro Porteño stadium which has a capacity of approximately 5,000 seats.

They wear the same colors as the traditional Paraguayan team Cerro Porteño, and since its foundation, did not compete in the Paraguayan First Division until the 2012 season.

== Current squad 2012 ==
Note: Flags indicate national team as defined under FIFA eligibility rules; some limited exceptions apply. Players may hold more than one non-FIFA nationality.

No.	Pos.	Nation	Player
1	GK	PAR	Rafael Aguero
2	DF	PAR	Cristian Ramírez
3	DF	PAR	Ricardo Caballero
4	DF	PAR	Jorge Villar
5	DF	PAR	Fabián Balbuena
6	MF	PAR	Oscar Benítez
7	MF	PAR	Fulvio Duarte
8	DF	PAR	Nelson Figueredo
9	FW	PAR	William Santacruz
10	MF	PAR	Leonardo Delvalle
11	FW	PAR	Francisco López
12	GK	PAR	Miguel López
13	DF	PAR	Marcos Pérez
14	MF	PAR	Miguel Godoy
15	MF	PAR	Joel González
16	MF	PAR	Christian Andersen

No.	Pos.	Nation	Player
17	FW	PAR	Sergio Samudio
18	MF	ARG	Benito Montalvo
19	DF	PAR	Arnaldo Recalde
20	MF	PAR	Reinaldo López
22	GK	PAR	Daniel Vergara
23	DF	PAR	Gustavo Velázquez
24	MF	COL	Bairon Parga
25	DF	PAR	José Martínez
26	FW	ARG	Ariel Andrusyzsyn
27	MF	PAR	Lauro David Aguero
28	FW	BRA	Adão da Conceicão Santos
29	FW	PAR	Wilson Benítez
30	GK	PAR	Juan Espínola
31	GK	PAR	Francisco López
32	FW	PAR	Fernando Suárez

== Notable players ==
To appear in this section a player must have either:

- Played at least 125 games for the club.
- Set a club record or won an individual award while at the club.
- Been part of a national team at any time.
- Played in the first division of any other football association (outside of Paraguay).
- Played in a continental and/or intercontinental competition.
1980s
- Ninguno

1990s

- (Paraguay) Francisco Aldo Barreto Miranda (1999–2003, 2014−2015)

2000s

- (Paraguay) Christian Ovelar (2003–2007, 2013)
- (Paraguay) Wilson Méndez (2003–2004, 2015)

2010s

- (Paraguay) Fabián Balbuena (2010−2012)
- (Paraguay) Rogerio Leichtweis (2012)
- (Paraguay) Nelson Figueredo (2012)
- (Argentina) Benito Montalvo (2012)
- (Argentina) Ariel Andrusyszyn (2012−2013)
- (Brazil) Adán dos Santos (2013)
- (Brazil) Fabiano Heves (2013)
- (Peru) Martín Tenemás (2013)
- (Brazil) Elías Moreira (2013−)
- (Peru) Jersi Socola (2014)
- (Venezuela) Wilbert Fernandez (2015−)
- (Venezuela) Wuiwel Isea (2015−)
- (Paraguay) Ángel Núñez (−2016)

Non-CONMEBOL players

- (Japan) Hiroki Uchida (2013)
- (Guatemala) Mike Gamboa (2014)

== Honours ==
- División Intermedia:

2011

- Paraguayan Third Division:

2002
