= 12 de Octubre Football Club =

Paraguayan football club

12 de Octubre
- Full name: 12 de Octubre Football Club
- Nicknames: Tejedores ("Weaverbirds"); El globo ("The globe")
- Founded: August 14, 1914; 112 years ago
- Ground: Estadio Luis Alberto Salinas Tanasio, Itaugua, Paraguay
- Capacity: 10,000
- President: Edgar Monges
- Manager: Robert Pereira
- League: Primera B Metropolitana
- 2023: División Intermedia, 16th of 16 (Relegated by average)
Home colours	Away colours

12 de Octubre Football Club is a Paraguayan football club from the city of Itauguá that currently plays in the División Intermedia, the second division of Football in Paraguay. Founded in 1914, the club's home venue is Estadio Luis Alberto Salinas Tanasio.

The club is the only club outside the Asuncion Metropolitan Area to win a league title.

== History ==
The club was founded on 14 August 1914 by the Tanasio family. The name of the club, 12 de Octubre, was chosen in honor of Columbus Day. The club's colors were chosen based on some flowers a school teacher had. The team played in the regional leagues from their foundation until they were promoted to the first division B in 1996. The following year, they won the División Intermedia, and were promoted to the Primera Division.

In 2001, they placed 10th in the Apertura and 3rd in the Clausura. Their placement in the Clausura qualified them for the Liguilla, which they won and gave them a spot in the 2002 Copa Libertadores. In the tournament, they were eliminated in the group stage after finishing 3rd in a group that contained Gremio, Cienciano, and Oriente Petrolero. However, they still managed to record 3 wins: 1-0 against powerhouse Gremio and Cienciano, and 3-2 against Oriente Petrolero.

In the 2002 season they finished runner up in the Apertura tournament behind Sportivo Luqueño and won the Clausura tournament but lost in the absolute finals against Libertad 2-6 on aggregate. Despite losing the finals, their overall standing, which was first in the aggregate table, gave them a spot in the 2003 Copa Libertadores, where they were knocked out by finishing last in the group stage and only winning one game against Ecuador's El Nacional.

They weren't as successful as the previous year during the next season, as they finished 9th and 7th in the Apertura and Clausura tournaments respectively.

In 2007, 12 de Octubre arrived to the last matchday of the Clausura, after having a poor season, one step away from being relegated. They had to play against their rival for the fight of permanence, Sportivo Trinidense. Only a victory could save the club. In the 85th minute, Trinidense scored and were winning 1-0. But in the final minutes of the game when it seemed like their relegation was secured, the score was turned around with goals from Diego Miranda and Elvis Marecos, and the game finished 2-1. For the moment the club was saving itself from being relegated but they still had to play Club General Díaz from the city of Luque. The first leg was won by General Diaz 2-1 in Luque. At halftime in the second leg, the score was 2-2 (3-4 on aggregate), which put 12 de Octubre in a tough position again. However, with great effort and the support from the fans, they turned things around by winning the game 4-2 (5-4 on aggregate) with goals from Hugo Notario, Francisco Esteche, Diego Miranda, and Domingo Ortiz. The victory secured their permanence in the Primera Division for the next season.

In 2009, after finishing with the second worst average of points obtained in the last three seasons, the team once again had to play the promotion/relegation playoff. They faced Sport Colombia, where they lost 3-0 on penalties after drawing 3-3 on aggregate. This meant that 12 de Octubre was relegated to the Segunda Division after 11 years in the top flight.

In 2010, the team had an irregular season in the Segunda Division, reaching both top and bottom of the table but finishing mid table at the end of the season. For the 2011 season, Jacinto Elizeche was appointed as the team's manager, although the poor results throughout the season brought about his dismissal. Estanislao Struway succeeded him as manager, but the results under his spell did not improve, and the team was relegated to the Tercera Division that season with Struway also being sacked.

In 2012, in their first participation in the third division, they were champions with only 3 games lost. With this they returned to the Segunda Division in 2013 with only a year of absence.

The 2013 season was a good one for the club. It finished runner-up behind champion 3 de Febrero, and achieved promotion back to the top tier for the 2014 season.

== Stadium ==
The stadium was opened in 1965 and has a capacity of 10,000. It was called Estadio Juan Canuto Pettengill until 2016, when it was changed to Estadio Luis Alberto Salinas Tanasio in honor of Luis Salinas, ex president of the club. The stadium was expanded with the addition of an east stand in 2003, and received floodlights the following year.

== Honours ==
- Paraguayan Primera Division
  - Champions: 2002 Clausura
  - Runners-up: 2002 Apertura
- Pre-Libertadores Playoffs
  - Champions: 2001
- Paraguayan Segunda Division
  - Champions (1): 1997
  - Runners-up (2): 2013, 2019
- Paraguayan Tercera Division
  - Champions (2): 2012, 2018

=== Regional titles ===
- Central League
  - Winners: 1949
- Cordilleran League
  - Winners (2): 1965, 1972
- Itauguá League
  - Winners (14): 1924, 1926, 1927, 1967, 1980, 1983, 1985, 1986, 1987, 1988, 1989, 1991, 1993, 1995

== Performance in CONMEBOL competitions ==
- Copa Libertadores: 2 appearances

2002: First Round
2003: First Round

== Current squad ==
As of 6 March 2022

Note: Flags indicate national team as defined under FIFA eligibility rules; some limited exceptions apply. Players may hold more than one non-FIFA nationality.

No.	Pos.	Nation	Player
1	GK	PAR	Bernardo Medina
3	MF	PAR	Alexis González
4	DF	PAR	César Benítez
6	DF	PAR	Danilo Ortiz
7	MF	PAR	Nélson Sanabria
9	FW	ARG	Martín Batallini
10	MF	PAR	David Mendieta
11	MF	PAR	Jorge Núñez
14	DF	PAR	Paulo da Silva
16	MF	PAR	Osmar Molinas
18	FW	PAR	Dionicio Pérez
19	FW	PAR	Julio Doldán
21	MF	PAR	Alexis Rojas

No.	Pos.	Nation	Player
22	GK	ARG	Agustín Silva
23	DF	PAR	Rodrigo Alborno
24	MF	PAR	Edgar Ferreira
26	FW	PAR	Ronald Roa
27	MF	PAR	Jorge González
28	DF	PAR	Víctor Ayala
29	DF	PAR	Víctor Dávalos
30	FW	PAR	José Ortigoza
33	DF	PAR	Alex Garcete
37	DF	PAR	Gonzalo Duré
40	GK	PAR	Rodrigo Giménez
—	MF	ARG	Axel Juárez
—	MF	PAR	Aldo Vera

== Notable players ==
To appear in this section a player must have either:

- Played at least 125 games for the club.
- Set a club record or won an individual award while at the club.
- Been part of a national team at any time.
- Played in the first division of any other football association (outside of Paraguay).
- Played in a continental and/or intercontinental competition.

1990s

- (Paraguay) Salvador Cabañas (1998–2001, 2012)
- (Paraguay) Dario Veron (1999–2003)

2000s

- (Paraguay) Fredy Bareiro (2001–2003)
- (Paraguay) Miguel Ángel Cuéllar (2005)
- (Paraguay) Lorenzo Melgarejo (2009)

Non-CONMEBOL players

- (Cameroon) Tobie Mimboe
- (Cameroon) Kenneth Nkweta Nju (2002–2003)
- (Spain) Mikel Arce (2009)

== Gallery ==
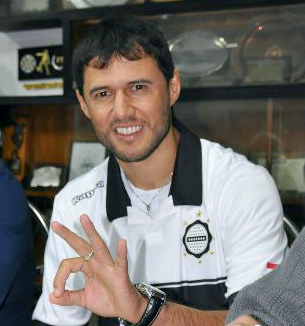
Former striker Fredy Bareiro played for the club in the early 2000's

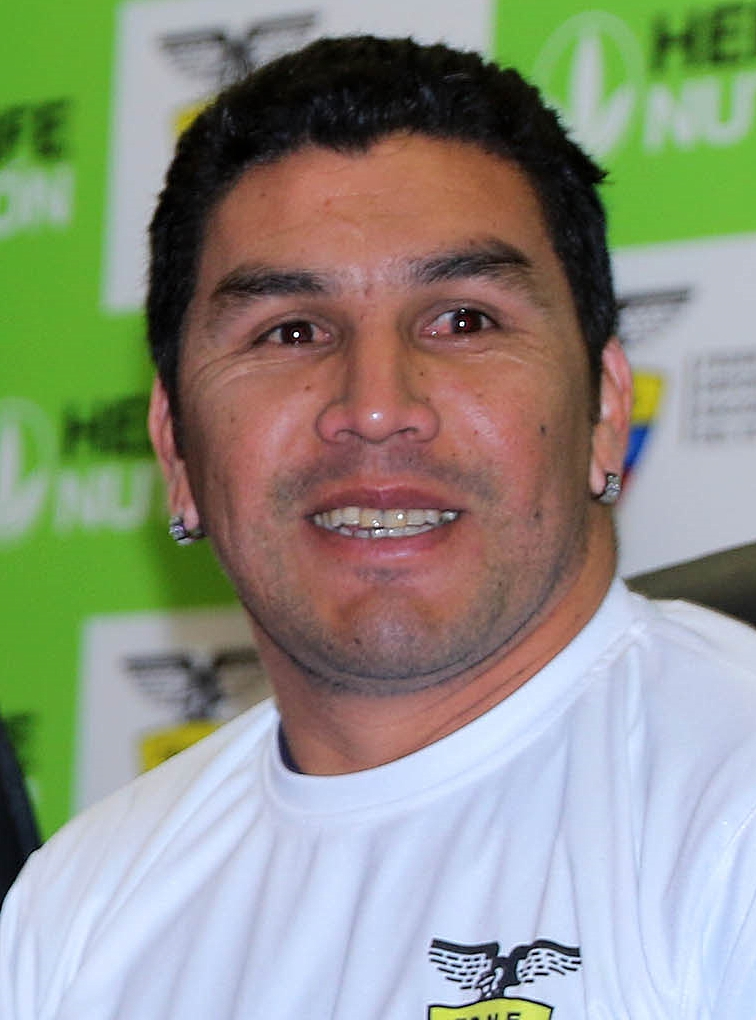
Salvador Cabañas began his career at the club and later returned for another stint in 2012 until 2003

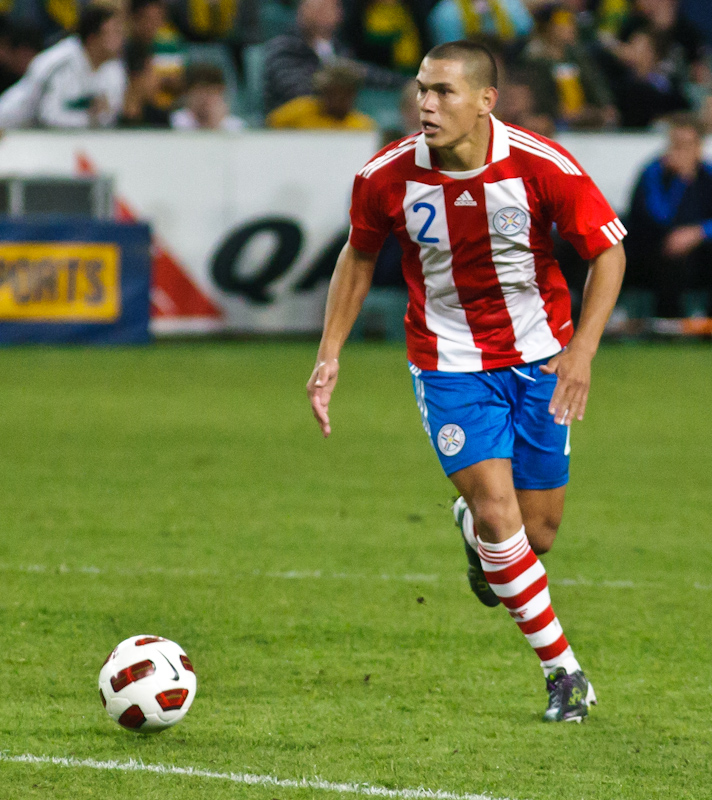
Dario Veron began his career at the club before playing in Chile and Mexico and for the Paraguay national team
