= Estadio Feliciano Cáceres =

Stadium in Luque, Paraguay

Coordinates: 25°16′20″S 57°29′35″W

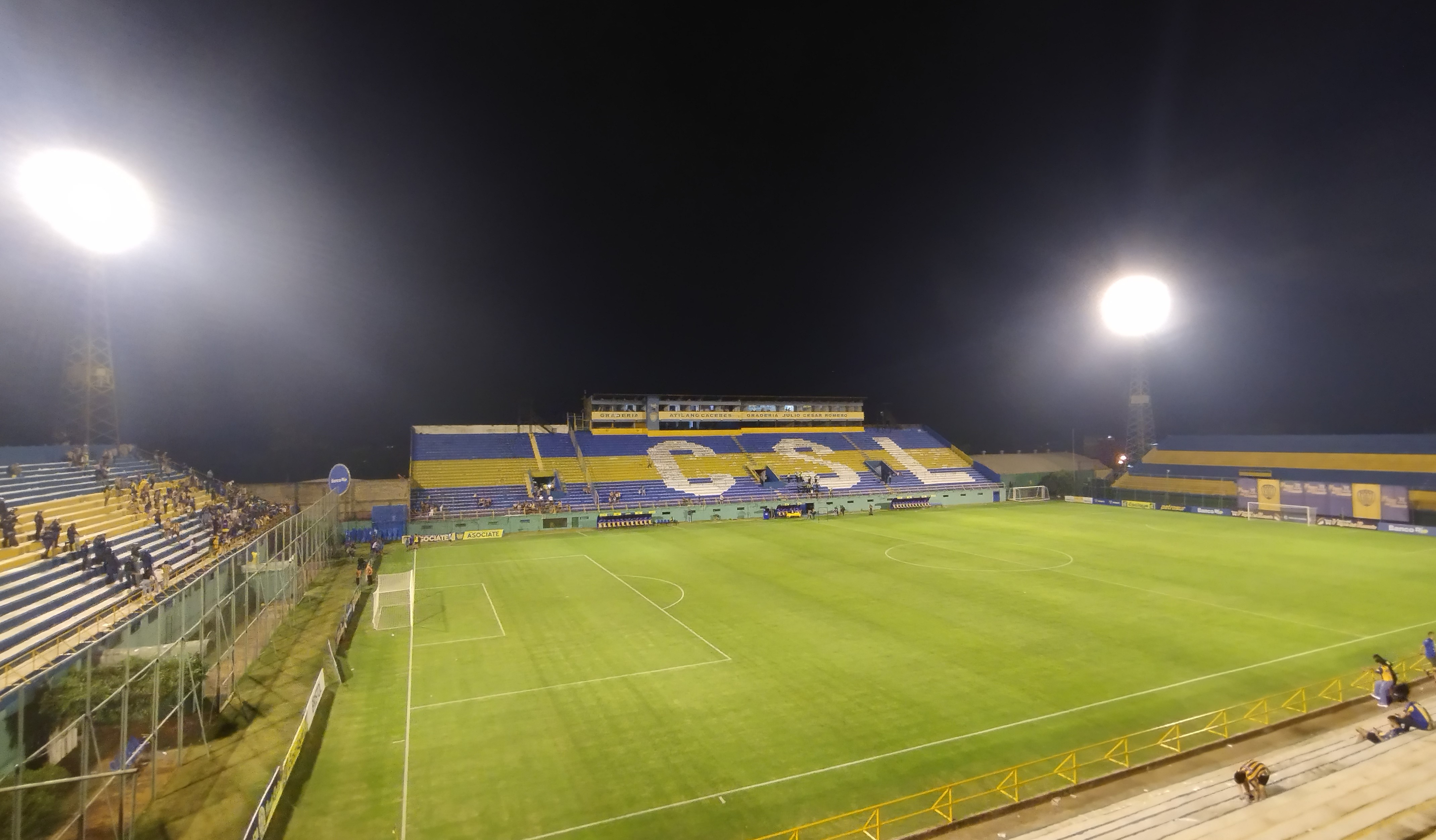
- Interactive map of Estadio Feliciano Cáceres
- Full name: Estadio Feliciano Cáceres
- Location: Luque, Paraguay
- Owner: Sportivo Luqueño
- Capacity: 24,000
- Surface: Grass
- Field size: 100 m × 66 m (328 ft × 217 ft)

Construction
- Opened: 1999 (after renovation)
- Architect: Amado Peralta

Tenant
- Sportivo Luqueño

Estadio Feliciano Cáceres is a football stadium located in Luque, Paraguay. It is the home venue of Sportivo Luqueño and is named after former club president Feliciano Cáceres. The old stadium was torn down and this stadium was built for use in the 1999 Copa América. The stadium hosted games played by Uruguay, Colombia, Argentina and Ecuador. The field's cesped is natural grass.

== History ==
The stadium was remodeled for the 1999 Copa América, that Paraguay hosted.

In August 2004, caused by disturbances from Sportivo Luqueño fans in a Primera División Paraguaya game, the club was sanctioned for 30 days and the Estadio Feliciano Cáceres was inhabilitad until September.

In January 2012, because of the closing of the Estadio Defensores del Chaco and the Estadio Manuel Ferreira, Club Olimpia Asunción were programmed to play most of its 2012 Copa Libertadores and Torneo Apertura games inside the Estadio Feliciano Cáceres.

In June 2020, the stadium's re-opening was approved of following an inspection by the authorities of the Asociación Paraguaya de Fútbol for Sportivo Luqueño to use for official games, last playing inside the stadium in the 2018 Torneo Clausura.

== See also ==
- List of association football stadiums by capacity
- List of stadiums in Paraguay
