= Club General Díaz (Luque) =

Paraguayan football club

General Díaz
- Full name: General Díaz Football Club
- Nicknames: Olimpia' í (Little Olimpia); Las Águilas (The Eagles); Pájaros Blancos (White Birds)
- Founded: September 22, 1917; 109 years ago
- Ground: Estadio General Adrián Jara, Luque, Paraguay
- Capacity: 4,000
- President: Jorge González Aguilera
- Manager: Cristian Martínez
- League: Primera B
- 2023: 5th of 17
- Website: https://web.archive.org/web/20200210000239/http://www.generaldiaz.com/
Home colours	Away colours

General Díaz Football Club is a Paraguayan football club from Luque that currently plays in the Primera División B Metropolitana, the third division of Paraguayan league system. Founded in 1917, it plays at the Estadio General Adrián Jara in Luque.

The club's name came from José Eduvigis Díaz, a Paraguayan general.

== History ==
The club was founded on September 22, 1917.

In 2004, the club finished as runner-up of the Tercera División, but only one club was available for promotion at that time. In 2006, they were runner-up again, but this time they were able to be promoted to the Segunda Division (Intermedia). In 2012, they were the champions of the Division Intermedia, and were promoted to the Primera Division for the first time in the club's history.

In 2013, the club qualified for its first ever continental tournament, the Copa Sudamericana, through their placement in the aggregate table (Apertura & Clausura combined). They did this in their first season in the top tier, being one of the only two Paraguayan clubs to achieve this along with Deportivo Capiatá. In the 2014 Copa Sudamericana, they played C.D. Cobresal of Chile first, and won 4-3 on aggregate (2-1, 2-2). Then they played Colombian powerhouse Atlético Nacional, where they produced a massive upset by winning the first leg at the Estadio Atanasio Girardot in Medellín 2-0, but lost the second leg in Luque 1-3. Although the aggregate score was 3-3, Atletico Nacional advanced because of the away goals rule.

In 2017, the club finished sixth in the aggregate league table, meaning it qualified for the 2018 Copa Sudamericana, their second time participating in the competition. They began their campaign by playing against Ecuadorian powerhouse Barcelona S.C., beating them 2-1 on aggregate. Then they faced Colombian side Millonarios F.C., where they drew the first leg 1-1 at Estadio Defensores del Chaco in Asunción. They played there because their regular stadium was too small for continental competition games. General Díaz lost the second leg 4-0 at Estadio El Campín in Bogotá, and were knocked out of the tournament with an aggregate score of 1-5.

== Stadium ==
General Diaz plays its home games at Estadio General Adrían Jara, which has a capacity of 4,000 and was built in 1974.The stadium is currently undergoing a renovation and expansion since January 2019. The stadium's capacity will be expanded from 4000 to 7000, and will have a new press box and new changing rooms.

== Honours ==
- División Intermedia
  - Champions (1): 2012
- División Intermedia
  - Runners-up (1): 2007
- Paraguayan Tercera División
  - Runners-up (2): 2004, 2006
- Liga Luqueña de Fútbol
  - Champions (3): 1966, 1967, 1968

== Current squad ==
As of 8 March 2020

Note: Flags indicate national team as defined under FIFA eligibility rules; some limited exceptions apply. Players may hold more than one non-FIFA nationality.

No.	Pos.	Nation	Player
1	GK	PAR	Gustavo Serdán
2	DF	PAR	Pablo Meza
3	DF	PAR	Gustavo Noguera
5	MF	PAR	Álvaro Campuzano
6	MF	PAR	Estivel Moreira
7	DF	PAR	Fabián Franco
8	MF	ARG	Pablo Gaitán
9	FW	PAR	Sergio Bareiro
10	MF	PAR	Gustavo Cristaldo
11	FW	PAR	Diego Doldán
12	GK	PAR	Jorge Luis González
13	DF	PAR	Néstor González
14	DF	PAR	Arnaldo Recalde
15	MF	PAR	David Villalba
16	MF	PAR	Wilfrido Báez
17	FW	PAR	Bruno Medina

No.	Pos.	Nation	Player
18	DF	PAR	Diego Vera
20	MF	ARG	Rubén Ríos
21	FW	PAR	Gerardo Arévalos
22	DF	PAR	Matías Barreto
23	FW	PAR	Ever Ramírez
23	FW	PAR	Edsson Riveros
24	DF	PAR	Marcos Gamarra
25	GK	PAR	Ever Caballero
26	FW	BRA	Lenon Farías
27	MF	PAR	Jorge González
28	MF	PAR	Gustavo Legal
29	DF	PAR	Sebastián Zaracho
31	MF	PAR	David Valenzuela
32	MF	PAR	Edgar Villalba
33	DF	PAR	Álex Garcete
—	DF	PAR	Luis Lezcano

== Notable players ==
To appear in this section a player must have either:

- Played at least 125 games for the club.
- Set a club record or won an individual award while at the club.
- Been part of a national team at any time.
- Played in the first division of any other football association (outside of Paraguay).
- Played in a continental and/or intercontinental competition.

2000's

- (Palestine) Javier Cohene (2005)

2010's

- (Colombia) César Caicedo (2014)
