= 2026 Copa Libertadores de Futsal =

Copa CONMEBOL Libertadores de Futsal Brazil 2026

Tournament details
- Host country: Brazil
- City: Carlos Barbosa
- Dates: 24 – 31 May
- Teams: 12 (from 10 associations)
- Venue: 1 (in 1 host city)

Final positions
- Champions: (Brazil) Carlos Barbosa (7th title)
- Runners-up: (Brazil) Magnus Futsal
- Third place: (Argentina) Boca Juniors
- Fourth place: (Venezuela) Centauros

Tournament statistics
- Matches played: 32

The 2026 CONMEBOL Libertadores Futsal was the 25th edition of the Copa Libertadores de Futsal, South America's premier club futsal tournament organized by CONMEBOL. It was held for the fourth time in Carlos Barbosa, Rio Grande do Sul, Brazil from 24 to 31 May 2026.

Peñarol were the defending champions.

== Teams ==
The competition was contested by 12 teams: the title holders, one entry from each of the ten CONMEBOL associations, plus an additional entry from the host association.

Association	Team	Qualification method
Argentina	Boca Juniors	2025 Copa Libertadores Qualification Tournament.
Bolivia	Morales Moralitos	2025 Liga Nacional de Futsal champions.
Brazil (hosts)	Magnus Futsal	2025 Supercopa de Futsal champions.
Brazil (hosts)	Carlos Barbosa	Hosts.
Chile	Colo-Colo	2025 Supercopa de Futsal champions.
Colombia	Deportivo Lyon	2025 Liga de Futsal champions.
Ecuador	Divino Niño	2025 Liga Nacional de Futsal champions.
Paraguay	Cerro Porteño	2025 Liga Premium de Futsal champions.
Peru	Panta Walon	2025 Liga Futsal Pro champions.
Uruguay	Peñarol (holders)	2025 Copa Libertadores de Futsal champions.
Uruguay	Nacional	2025 Campeonato Uruguayo de Fútbol Sala runners-up.
Venezuela	Centauros	2025 Liga FUTVE Futsal 1 champions.

== Venue ==
Carlos Barbosa	Location of the host city.
Centro Municipal de Eventos Sérgio Luiz Guerra	Location of the host city.
Capacity: 4,400	Location of the host city.

The host of this edition will be the Brazilian city of Carlos Barbosa, in the state of Rio Grande do Sul; all matches will be played at the Centro Municipal de Eventos Sérgio Luiz Guerra.

== Group stage ==
The top two teams of each group and the two best third-placed teams advanced to the quarter-finals.

=== Group A ===
Pos	Team	Pld	W	D	L	GF	GA	GD	Pts	Qualification
1	(Brazil) Carlos Barbosa (H)	3	2	1	0	12	2	+10	7	Quarter-finals
2	(Argentina) Boca Juniors	3	2	1	0	9	2	+7	7	Quarter-finals
3	(Bolivia) Morales Moralitos	3	0	1	2	3	11	−8	1	Ninth place play-off
4	(Uruguay) Peñarol	3	0	1	2	5	14	−9	1	Eleventh place play-off

Source: CONMEBOL
Rules for classification: Group stage tiebreakers
(H) Hosts

=== Group B ===
Pos	Team	Pld	W	D	L	GF	GA	GD	Pts	Qualification
1	(Brazil) Magnus Futsal	3	3	0	0	16	1	+15	9	Quarter-finals
2	(Venezuela) Centauros	3	2	0	1	6	5	+1	6	Quarter-finals
3	(Peru) Panta Walon	3	1	0	2	7	11	−4	3	Quarter-finals
4	(Ecuador) Divino Niño	3	0	0	3	3	15	−12	0	Eleventh place play-off

Source: CONMEBOL
Rules for classification: Group stage tiebreakers

=== Group C ===
Pos	Team	Pld	W	D	L	GF	GA	GD	Pts	Qualification
1	(Paraguay) Cerro Porteño	3	2	0	1	6	8	−2	6	Quarter-finals
2	(Colombia) Deportivo Lyon	3	2	0	1	6	4	+2	6	Quarter-finals
3	(Uruguay) Nacional	3	1	0	2	9	7	+2	3	Quarter-finals
4	(Chile) Colo-Colo	3	1	0	2	7	9	−2	3	Ninth place play-off

Source: CONMEBOL
Rules for classification: Group stage tiebreakers

=== Ranking of third-placed teams ===
Pos	Grp	Team	Pld	W	D	L	GF	GA	GD	Pts	Qualification
1	C	(Uruguay) Nacional	3	1	0	2	9	7	+2	3	Quarter-finals
2	B	(Peru) Panta Walon	3	1	0	2	7	11	−4	3	Quarter-finals
3	A	(Bolivia) Morales Moralitos	3	0	1	2	3	11	−8	1	Ninth place play-off

Updated to match(es) played on unknown. Source: CONMEBOL
Rules for classification: 1) Points; 2) Goal difference; 3) Goals scored; 4) Fewest number of red cards received; 5) Fewest number of yellow cards received; 6) Draw.

=== Ranking of fourth-placed teams ===
Pos	Grp	Team	Pld	W	D	L	GF	GA	GD	Pts	Qualification
1	C	(Chile) Colo-Colo	3	1	0	2	7	9	−2	3	Ninth place play-off
2	B	(Ecuador) Divino Niño	3	0	0	3	3	15	−12	0	Eleventh place play-off
3	A	(Uruguay) Peñarol	3	0	1	2	5	14	−9	1	Eleventh place play-off

Source: CONMEBOL
Rules for classification: 1) Points; 2) Goal difference; 3) Goals scored; 4) Fewest number of red cards received; 5) Fewest number of yellow cards received; 6) Draw.

== Final stage ==
In the quarter-finals, semi-finals and final, extra time and penalty shoot-out would be used to decide the winner if necessary, with the play-offs for third to twelfth place being decided directly penalty shoot-out in case of tie (Regulations Article 22).

=== Bracket ===
The quarter-final matchups are:

- QF1: Winner Group A vs. 2nd Best Third Place
- QF2: Winner Group B vs. 1st Best Third Place
- QF3: Winner Group C vs. Runner-up Group A
- QF4: Runner-up Group B vs. Runner-up Group C

The semi-final matchups are:

- SF1: Winner QF1 vs. Winner QF4
- SF2: Winner QF2 vs. Winner QF3

5th place match
30 May
(Peru) Panta Walon	5
(Uruguay) Nacional	0
7th place match
30 May
(Colombia) Deportivo Lyon	4
(Paraguay) Cerro Porteño	6

5th–8th place semi-finals
29 May
(Peru) Panta Walon	3
(Colombia) Deportivo Lyon	1
29 May
(Uruguay) Nacional	5
(Paraguay) Cerro Porteño	3

Quarter-finals
28 May
(Brazil) Carlos Barbosa	3
(Peru) Panta Walon	0
28 May
(Venezuela) Centauros	2 (3)
(Colombia) Deportivo Lyon	2 (0)
28 May
(Brazil) Magnus Futsal	6
(Uruguay) Nacional	0
28 May
(Paraguay) Cerro Porteño	1
(Argentina) Boca Juniors	3

Semi-finals
30 May
(Brazil) Carlos Barbosa	2
(Venezuela) Centauros	0
30 May
(Brazil) Magnus Futsal	3
(Argentina) Boca Juniors	1

Final
31 May
(Brazil) Carlos Barbosa	2 (7)
(Brazil) Magnus Futsal	2 (6)
3rd place match
31 May
(Venezuela) Centauros	1
(Argentina) Boca Juniors	6

11th place match
29 May
(Uruguay) Peñarol	6
(Ecuador) Divino Niño	1

9th place match
29 May
(Bolivia) Morales Moralitos	2
(Chile) Colo-Colo	4
