= Corrales FBC =

Fútsal club in Barrio Obero, Asunción, Paraguay

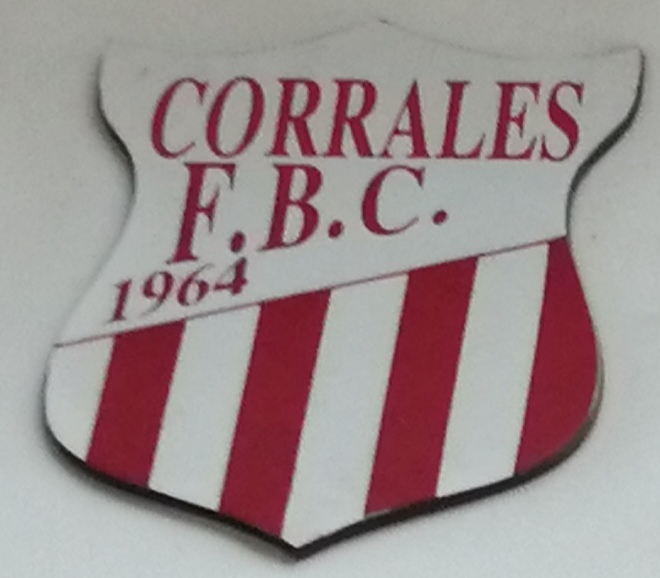
- Founded: 1964
- Ground: Barrio Obrero, Asunción, Paraguay
- Capacity: -
- Chairman: -
- Manager: -
- League: Campeonato de Futsal de Paraguay

Corrales FBC is a fútsal club in the Barrio Obrero of Asunción in Paraguay. The club participates in the Asociación Paraguaya de Fútbol's fútsal league.

== History ==
=== 2002 ===
In 2002, Corrales played in the Asociación Paraguaya de Fútbol's División de Ascenso.

=== 2003 ===
In 2003, the club played in the Asociación Paraguaya de Fútbol's División Intermedia (Copa de Bronce) Fútsal League, being defeated 6 to 4 against Luis Guanella in the first round match of their Serie A Group.

=== 2009 ===
In 2009, the club fielded a team in the Senior Fútsal Championship organized by Club Fomento in Barrio Obrero in Asunción.

== Venue ==
=== Location ===
Corrales FBC fútsal venue is located in Barrio Obrero in Asunción.

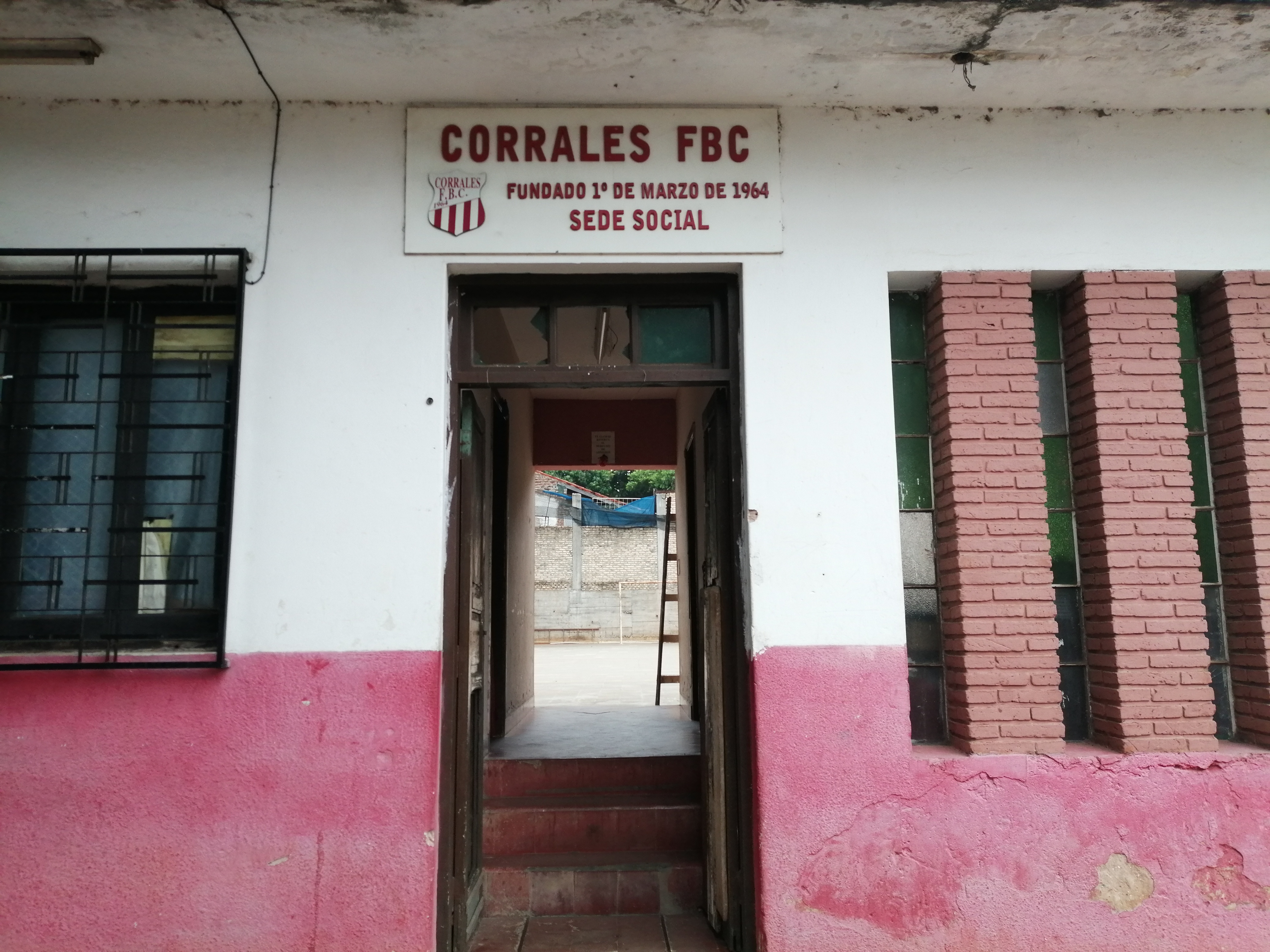
View of the club entry from the 11 Proyectada Street

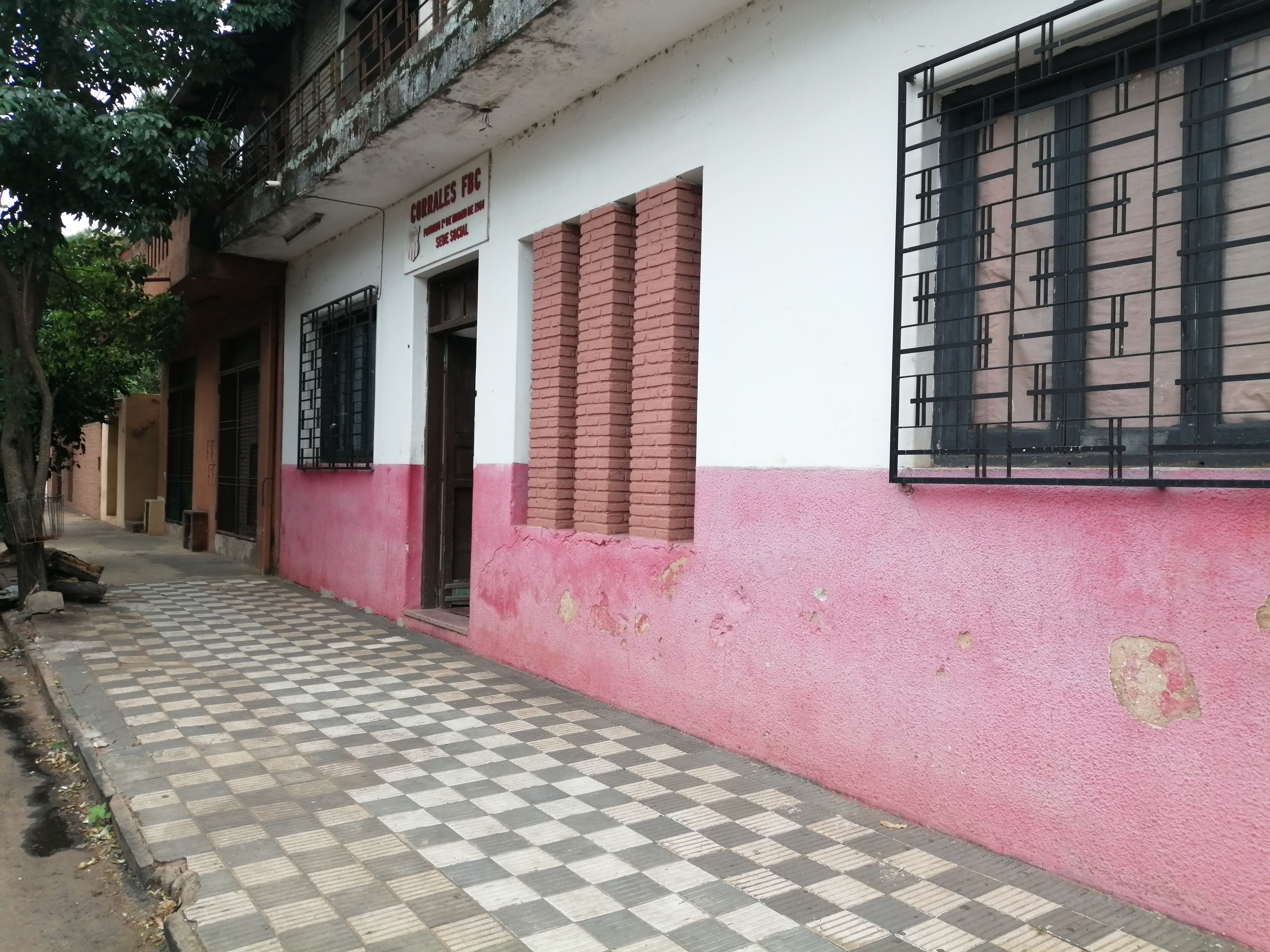
Exterior view of the club from the 11 Proyectadas Street

== See also ==
- Futsal in Paraguay
- Campeonato de Futsal de Paraguay
