= Club Sport Colonial =

Paraguayan football team

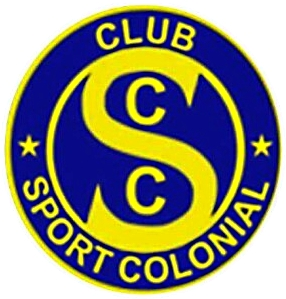
- Short name: Sport Colonial
- Founded: January 18, 1948
- Ground: Don Celestino Mongelós Stadium
- Capacity: 600
- Coordinates: 25°18′49″S 57°39′1″W
- Coach: Mario Bulquin
- League: Primera División C
- 2023: 7th
Home colours	Away colours

Club Sport Colonial is a Paraguayan football team based in the barrio Obrero, and its stadium located in barrio Santa Ana, both of them in the city of Asunción. The club was founded on January 18, 1948. They play in the Cuarta División, the fourth and last category of Paraguayan football league system. They play at home at the Don Celestino Mongelós Stadium, which has an approximate capacity of 600 spectators.

The club also have a good representation in the futsal category as part of the Liga Premium de Futsal, the highest level competition in the Paraguayan futsal league system.

== History ==
=== Foundation ===
The club was founded on January 18, 1948, the year after Paraguay suffered a civil war, residents of the Tacumbú neighborhood came together to form a new club. Its name derives from the fact that the "colonial" Asunción was expanding towards the south. It had its first sports field in what are currently Chile and 19 Proyectadas streets in the Obrero neighborhood, but the club is popularly identified with the Tacumbú neighborhood, where they have its headquarters and sports center called Concepción Vera. Near by its headquarters it had its first football stadium but in 1965 it moved to the neighborhood of Santa Ana, precisely on México and 33 Proyectadas streets where the Don Celestino Mongelós Stadium currently located.

=== The only title ===
The only official title the club has achieved was that of the 1998 season, it managed to win the championship of the Segunda de Ascenso (Fourth Division), thereby also gaining its promotion to the Primera de Ascenso (Third Division). Mr. Evelio Vera Brizuela was president of the club at that time and the squad was composed of César Rodríguez, Víctor Ortellado, Luis Brítez, Esteban Ibarra, Cristian Valiente, Fermín Román, José Sánchez, Raúl Giménez, Rubén Núñez, Gregorio Fernández, Francisco Mongelós (grandson of Don Celestino Mongelós), Dany Fornera, Adolfo Morel, Aldo Benítez, Sindulfo Segovia, René Peralta, Higinio Gill, Antonio Acosta, Robert Bareiro, Félix Segovia, Richard Villar and Ricardo Notario and the coaching staff was conformed by Salvador Ortellado and Felipe Barrios.

=== Relegation, removal and return ===
The club was only able to stay in the Third Division for a couple of years. Then they were relegated to the last category and in 2011, finishing in last place in the general table, they were punished with a removal of all competitions for one year. They had to return to the 2013 championship, but since they could not meet all the requirements of the division they could not return.

It was recently readmitted to the 2014 Primera Division C season, where it finished in 12th place among 15 teams.

In the 2015 season, after a very bad campaign where it won only one game and finished in the last position in the standings, the club was saved from being removed again by not finishing last in the average table.

In the 2016 season they improved their performance and in the first phase of the championship they finished tied for eighth place with Presidente Hayes, with whom they had to play a tiebreaker match for the eighth place, which would allow the winner to advance to the second phase of the tournament. Finally, in the tiebreaker match, the club lost on penalties to Presidente Hayes, after finishing the match tied at 1 goal.

In the 2018 season the club had a good campaign, remaining at the top of the table, and reaching the last fixture of the championship with the possibility of promotion, finally taking the third place.

== Stadium ==
The club plays at Don Celestino Mongelós Stadium in the Santa Ana neighborhood, which has an approximate capacity of 600 spectators. The construction of the wall of the sports field begun in 1986, the ground breaking was carried out by then APF President Jesus Manuel Pallares, accompanied by Oscar Elizeche, President of the Second Promotion Division and Mr. Modesto Mongelós Marecos, Delegate of the Club at the APF.

In addition, the club has the Polideportivo Concepción Vera where the futsal teams play at home.

== Club data ==
- Removal seasons: 1 (2012)

== Honours ==
- Fourth Division (1): 1998.

== Other sports disciplines ==
=== Futsal ===
Another sporting discipline in which the club competes is futsal. In this sport the club has obtained several titles at the national and international level. In men's futsal, they have won 17 metropolitan and national titles, in addition to a three-time South American championship in 1991, 1992 and 1993. The club currently plays in the country's main futsal league, the Liga Premium de Futsal, with the second best performance in said league.

The women's futsal team has also won titles. In the 2011, 2014 and 2016. They were also runners-up in the Copa Libertadores Futsal Femenina in the 2017 and 2018 edition.

The youth categories have also become champions in this discipline.

Likewise, the senior team has obtained titles for the club.
