= Estadio Óscar Hugo Sosa =

Football stadium in Paraguay

Óscar Hugo Sosa
- Atlántida Stadium; Chaco'i Stadium; Estadio Atlántida Chaco'i; Estadio Complejo Oceánico
- Location: Nueva Asunción, Paraguay
- Owner: Atlántida Sport Club
- Capacity: 7,000
- Surface: Artificial turf
- Field size: 105 × 68

Construction
- Groundbreaking: 2021
- Opened: 2026
- Cost: USD 1 million

Tenant
- Atlántida Sport Club

The Óscar Hugo Sosa (also known as Atlántida Stadium or Chaco'i Stadium) will be a football stadium in Paraguay located in the city of Nueva Asunción, and is owned by Atlántida Sport Club, which will host it.

It will have an initial capacity of 7,000 spectators, although in a second stage it is intended to expand its capacity to 18,000 spectators, and once inaugurated it will be the football stadium with the largest capacity in the Western Region of Paraguay, surpassing the Facundo de León Fossati Stadium of the Club 12 de Junio, which has a capacity for 5,000 seated people.

The property will have a main playing field and several auxiliary fields that will be made entirely of artificial turf, this to save water, a commodity that is scarce in the Paraguayan Chaco region, and will also have a large parking lot for 2,000 vehicles.

== Origin of the name ==
It receives its current name because the entire Chaco region (and part of the Eastern Region) was formerly a sea about 400 million years ago, during the Silurian-Devonian period. That is to say, the current Chaco soil was the seabed, which is why some vestiges such as fossils of marine invertebrates animals and large underground deposits of salt water can still be found in the area.

This fact has a certain parallel with the origin of the club's name, which comes from the myth of Atlantis, a legendary island that is supposedly lost because it sank in the middle of the sea until it disappeared completely. Another parallel is found in the location of the stadium, since Nueva Asunción until very recently was a municipality that suffered constant flooding due to the rising waters of the Paraguay River, becoming a veritable "sea" for its inhabitants, due to its location in a low-lying area near the river, but this has changed in recent years, since thanks to the construction of the Héroes del Chaco Bridge and the real estate development of the district, most of the land has been filled in to prevent further flooding.

Because of these parallels and similarities, the stadium was named "Mar del Chaco".

== History ==
In 2001, the Atlántida Sport Club acquired 50 hectares in Nueva Asunción (10 km from Asunción) with the goal of building a new stadium there in the future. But this construction was not completed immediately because the club went through many ups and downs during those years. It wasn't until two decades later, in September 2021, that this project was able to begin, although due to restrictions caused by the COVID-19 pandemic and other setbacks, the work was delayed for some time. Currently, the work continues at a slow but steady pace, with a progress of more than 50%, with a view to completing the first stage by 2026.
