= Flaviano Díaz Stadium =

Football stadium in Asunción, Paraguay

- Interactive map of Flaviano Díaz Stadium
- Location: Asunción, Paraguay
- Coordinates: 25.2972°S 57.6391°W
- Capacity: 1,000

Tenants
- Atlántida Sport Club (¿? - 2026)

The Flaviano Díaz Stadium is a football stadium in Paraguay that is located in the Obrero neighborhood of the city of Asunción.

== History ==
The property dates back to the Atlántida Sport Club's early founding in 1906, initially being just a field and growing over time to become a small stadium with cement stands.

In 2001, the club purchased 50 hectares in Nueva Asunción (Ex Chaco'i) (10 km from Asunción), with the intention of build a new stadium there in the future.

In September 2021, the club began construction of its new stadium in Nueva Asunción, with an initial capacity of 18,000 and a final projected capacity of 29,000. Confirming that it will move there once the works are completed in 2026.

Therefore, the Flaviano Díaz Stadium in the Obrero neighborhood of Asunción will become only its social headquarters, maintaining only its futsal field and minor infrastructure, while its grass field will disappear completely and will be rented to a private company for the construction of a Mall.
