= Osvaldo Pangrazio =

Paraguayan footballer (born 1957)

Personal information
- Full name: Osvaldo Pangrazio Kullak
- Date of birth: 7 November 1957 (age 68)
- Place of birth: Asunción, Paraguay
- Height: 1.88 m (6 ft 2 in)
- Position: Striker

Youth career
- Presidente Hayes

Senior career*
Years	Team	Apps	(Gls)
1977	Presidente Hayes	?	(?)
1978–1979	Nacional	?	(?)
1980	CD Veracruz	?	(?)
1981	Deportivo Pereira	?	(?)
1981	Guaraní	?	(?)
1982–1986	Olimpia	?	(?)
1987	Cerro Porteño	?	(?)

International career
	Paraguay	?	(?)
- * Club domestic league appearances and goals

Osvaldo Pangrazio Kullak (born 7 November 1957) is a former football striker that currently works as a traumatologist.

== Career ==
=== Football ===
Pangrazio started his career at Presidente Hayes and made his debut in 1977 against Olimpia. Hayes was already relegated in 1977 and so he went on to play for Nacional in 1978 before going abroad to Mexico and Colombia to play for CD Veracruz and Deportivo Pereira respectively.

In 1981, he returned to Paraguay to play for Guaraní and a year later he was signed by Olimpia where he spent most of his career winning several championships and becoming a fan favorite. His last club was Cerro Porteño.

=== Medicine ===
While being a footballer, Pangrazio attended medical school and graduated in 1986. In 1987, he traveled to Bochum, Germany to focus on his specialization (traumatology). He came back to Paraguay in 1997 and worked in the medical staff of Club Olimpia until 1999. Currently, he works as a traumatologist for the Migone and the San Roque hospitals in Asunción and is part of the Medical Sports Committee of the Paraguayan Football Association.

== Titles ==
Season	Team	Title
1982	Olimpia	Paraguayan 1st division
1983	Olimpia	Paraguayan 1st division
1985	Olimpia	Paraguayan 1st division
