= 2019 Copa Libertadores Femenina de Futsal =

Copa CONMEBOL Libertadores Femenina de Futsal Brasil 2019

Tournament details
- Host country: Brazil
- City: Balneário Camboriú
- Dates: 1–8 December 2019
- Teams: 10 (from 10 associations)
- Venue: 1 (in 1 host city)

Final positions
- Champions: (Brazil) Baterias Jupiter/Cianorte (1st title)
- Runners-up: (Colombia) Independiente Cali
- Third place: (Argentina) Kimberley
- Fourth place: (Uruguay) Peñarol

Tournament statistics
- Matches played: 27
- Goals scored: 198 (7.33 per match)

The 2019 Copa CONMEBOL Libertadores Femenina de Futsal was the 6th edition of the Copa Libertadores Femenina de Futsal, South America's premier women's club futsal tournament organized by CONMEBOL. The tournament was held at Balneário Camboriú, Brazil between 1–8 December 2019.

Leões Da Serra were the defending champions, but did not qualify for this edition.

== Teams ==
The competition was contested by 10 teams: one entry from each of the ten CONMEBOL associations.

Association	Team
Argentina	Kimberley
Bolivia	Atlantes
Brazil (hosts)	Baterias Jupiter/Cianorte
Chile	Coquimbo Unido
Colombia	Independiente Cali
Ecuador	Aviced
Paraguay	Cerro Porteño
Peru	UNMSM
Uruguay	Peñarol
Venezuela	Estudiantes de Caracas

== Venues ==
The tournament was played at the Ginásio Hamilton Linhares Cruz in Balneário Camboriú.

== Draw ==
The draw of the tournament was held on 20 November 2019, 17:00 BRA (UTC−3), at the headquarters of the Federação Catarinense de Futebol in Balneário Camboriú. The ten teams were drawn into two groups of five. The following two teams were seeded:

- Group A: the representative from the host association (Brazil)
- Group B: the representative from the association which were the runners-up from the previous edition (Paraguay)

The other teams were seeded based on the results of their association in the 2018 Copa Libertadores Femenina de Futsal. Each group, apart from the seeded team, contained two teams from each of Pot 1 and Pot 2.

Seeds	Pot 1	Pot 2
(Brazil) Baterias Jupiter/Cianorte (Group A); (Paraguay) Cerro Porteño (Group B)	(Argentina) Kimberley; (Colombia) Independiente Cali; (Bolivia) Atlantes; (Ecuador) Aviced	(Uruguay) Peñarol; (Chile) Coquimbo Unido; (Peru) UNMSM; (Venezuela) Estudiantes de Caracas

== Squads ==
Each team has to submit a squad of 14 players, including a minimum of two goalkeepers.

== Group stage ==
The top two teams of each group advance to the semi-finals.

Tiebreakers

The teams are ranked according to points (3 points for a win, 1 point for a draw, 0 points for a loss). If tied on points, tiebreakers are applied in the following order (Regulations Article 21):

1. Results in head-to-head matches between tied teams (points, goal difference, goals scored);
2. Goal difference in all matches;
3. Goals scored in all matches;
4. Drawing of lots.

All times are local, BRT (UTC−3).

=== Group A ===
Pos	Team	Pld	W	D	L	GF	GA	GD	Pts	Qualification
1	(Brazil) Baterias Jupiter/Cianorte (H)	4	4	0	0	39	2	+37	12	Knockout stage
2	(Colombia) Independiente Cali	4	2	1	1	22	13	+9	7	Knockout stage
3	(Peru) UNMSM	4	2	1	1	16	20	−4	7	Fifth place play-off
4	(Chile) Coquimbo Unido	4	0	1	3	6	21	−15	1	Seventh place play-off
5	(Ecuador) Aviced	4	0	1	3	12	39	−27	1	Ninth place play-off

Source: CONMEBOL
Rules for classification: Group stage tiebreakers
(H) Hosts
1 December 2019
14:00

Baterias Jupiter/Cianorte (Brazil)	16–0	(Ecuador) Aviced
	Report

Ginásio Hamilton Linhares Cruz, Balneário Camboriú
1 December 2019
16:00

Independiente Cali (Colombia)	4–1	(Chile) Coquimbo Unido
	Report

Ginásio Hamilton Linhares Cruz, Balneário Camboriú

2 December 2019
14:00

UNMSM (Peru)	6–4	(Ecuador) Aviced
	Report

Ginásio Hamilton Linhares Cruz, Balneário Camboriú
2 December 2019
16:00

Independiente Cali (Colombia)	1–4	(Brazil) Baterias Jupiter/Cianorte
	Report

Ginásio Hamilton Linhares Cruz, Balneário Camboriú

3 December 2019
14:00

Coquimbo Unido (Chile)	0–6	(Peru) UNMSM
	Report

Ginásio Hamilton Linhares Cruz, Balneário Camboriú
3 December 2019
16:00

Aviced (Ecuador)	4–13	(Colombia) Independiente Cali
	Report

Ginásio Hamilton Linhares Cruz, Balneário Camboriú

4 December 2019
14:00

Coquimbo Unido (Chile)	1–7	(Brazil) Baterias Jupiter/Cianorte
	Report

Ginásio Hamilton Linhares Cruz, Balneário Camboriú
4 December 2019
16:00

UNMSM (Peru)	4–4	(Colombia) Independiente Cali
	Report

Ginásio Hamilton Linhares Cruz, Balneário Camboriú

5 December 2019
14:00

Aviced (Ecuador)	4–4	(Chile) Coquimbo Unido
	Report

Ginásio Hamilton Linhares Cruz, Balneário Camboriú
5 December 2019
16:00

Baterias Jupiter/Cianorte (Brazil)	12–0	(Peru) UNMSM
	Report

Ginásio Hamilton Linhares Cruz, Balneário Camboriú

=== Group B ===
Pos	Team	Pld	W	D	L	GF	GA	GD	Pts	Qualification
1	(Uruguay) Peñarol	4	3	1	0	13	8	+5	10	Knockout stage
2	(Argentina) Kimberley	4	2	2	0	19	7	+12	8	Knockout stage
3	(Venezuela) Estudiantes de Caracas	4	2	0	2	7	9	−2	6	Fifth place play-off
4	(Paraguay) Cerro Porteño	4	1	1	2	12	11	+1	4	Seventh place play-off
5	(Bolivia) Atlantes	4	0	0	4	2	18	−16	0	Ninth place play-off

Source: CONMEBOL
Rules for classification: Group stage tiebreakers
1 December 2019
18:00

Cerro Porteño (Paraguay)	5–0	(Bolivia) Atlantes
	Report

Ginásio Hamilton Linhares Cruz, Balneário Camboriú
1 December 2019
20:00

Kimberley (Argentina)	4–0	(Venezuela) Estudiantes de Caracas
	Report

Ginásio Hamilton Linhares Cruz, Balneário Camboriú

2 December 2019
18:00

Peñarol (Uruguay)	3–2	(Bolivia) Atlantes
	Report

Ginásio Hamilton Linhares Cruz, Balneário Camboriú
2 December 2019
20:00

Kimberley (Argentina)	4–4	(Paraguay) Cerro Porteño
	Report

Ginásio Hamilton Linhares Cruz, Balneário Camboriú

3 December 2019
18:00

Estudiantes de Caracas (Venezuela)	2–3	(Uruguay) Peñarol
	Report

Ginásio Hamilton Linhares Cruz, Balneário Camboriú
3 December 2019
20:00

Atlantes (Bolivia)	0–8	(Argentina) Kimberley
	Report

Ginásio Hamilton Linhares Cruz, Balneário Camboriú

4 December 2019
18:00

Estudiantes de Caracas (Venezuela)	3–2	(Paraguay) Cerro Porteño
	Report

Ginásio Hamilton Linhares Cruz, Balneário Camboriú
4 December 2019
20:00

Peñarol (Uruguay)	3–3	(Argentina) Kimberley
	Report

Ginásio Hamilton Linhares Cruz, Balneário Camboriú

5 December 2019
18:00

Atlantes (Bolivia)	0–2	(Venezuela) Estudiantes de Caracas
	Report

Ginásio Hamilton Linhares Cruz, Balneário Camboriú
5 December 2019
20:00

Cerro Porteño (Paraguay)	1–4	(Uruguay) Peñarol
	Report

Ginásio Hamilton Linhares Cruz, Balneário Camboriú

== Knockout stage ==
In the knockout stage, extra time and penalty shoot-out would be used to decide the winner if necessary (no extra time would be used in the play-offs for third to tenth place).

=== Bracket ===
Semi-finals
6 December
(Brazil) Baterias Jupiter/Cianorte	4
(Argentina) Kimberley	3
6 December
(Uruguay) Peñarol	3
(Colombia) Independiente Cali	6

Final
8 December
(Brazil) Baterias Jupiter/Cianorte	2
(Colombia) Independiente Cali	0
Third place play-off
8 December
(Argentina) Kimberley	4
(Uruguay) Peñarol	2

Fifth place play-off
7 December
(Peru) UNMSM	2 (1)
(Venezuela) Estudiantes de Caracas (p)	2 (3)

Seventh place play-off
7 December
(Chile) Coquimbo Unido	4 (1)
(Paraguay) Cerro Porteño (p)	4 (3)

Ninth place play-off
7 December
(Ecuador) Aviced	4
(Bolivia) Atlantes	10

=== Semi-finals ===
6 December 2019
14:00

Baterias Jupiter/Cianorte (Brazil)	4–3	(Argentina) Kimberley
	Report

Ginásio Hamilton Linhares Cruz, Balneário Camboriú

6 December 2019
16:00

Peñarol (Uruguay)	3–6	(Colombia) Independiente Cali
	Report

Ginásio Hamilton Linhares Cruz, Balneário Camboriú

=== Ninth place play-off ===
7 December 2019
14:00

Aviced (Ecuador)	4–10	(Bolivia) Atlantes

Ginásio Hamilton Linhares Cruz, Balneário Camboriú

=== Seventh place play-off ===
7 December 2019
16:00

Coquimbo Unido (Chile)	4–4	(Paraguay) Cerro Porteño
Penalties
	1–3

Ginásio Hamilton Linhares Cruz, Balneário Camboriú

=== Fifth place play-off ===
7 December 2019
18:00

UNMSM (Peru)	2–2	(Venezuela) Estudiantes de Caracas
Penalties
	1–3

Ginásio Hamilton Linhares Cruz, Balneário Camboriú

=== Third place play-off ===
8 December 2019
14:00

Kimberley (Argentina)	4–2	(Uruguay) Peñarol

Ginásio Hamilton Linhares Cruz, Balneário Camboriú

=== Final ===
8 December 2019
16:00

Baterias Jupiter/Cianorte (Brazil)	2–0	(Colombia) Independiente Cali
	Report

Ginásio Hamilton Linhares Cruz, Balneário Camboriú

== Final ranking ==
Rank	Team
1st place, gold medalist(s)	(Brazil) Baterias Jupiter/Cianorte
2nd place, silver medalist(s)	(Colombia) Independiente Cali
3rd place, bronze medalist(s)	(Argentina) Kimberley
4	(Uruguay) Peñarol
5	(Venezuela) Estudiantes de Caracas
6	(Peru) UNMSM
7	(Paraguay) Cerro Porteño
8	(Chile) Coquimbo Unido
9	(Bolivia) Atlantes
10	(Ecuador) Aviced
