= Futsal in Paraguay =

The practice of futsal in Paraguay is very popular and is one of the most practiced sports in the country. The governing body for futsal in Paraguay is the Asociación Paraguaya de Fútbol (Paraguayan football association), which controls the Paraguay national futsal team and is in charge of the organization of the Campeonato de Futsal de Paraguay (Paraguayan futsal tournament).

The Paraguayan futsal tournament is being held since 1987, declaring a champion every year. Since 1995 a new system consisting of two tournaments (Apertura and Clausura) was created, in which the national champion is declared by facing the winners of the Apertura and Clausura. Another tournament called "De Campeones" was also introduced.

In 2004, a second division tournament was created to allow for more teams to compete.

At the national team level, Paraguay has won three AMF Futsal World Cups, a bronze medal at the Pan American Games and one South American Futsal Championship.

== Clubs ==
=== Liga Premium ===
- 3 de Febrero
- AFEMEC
- Cerro Porteño
- Deportivo Recoleta
- Exa Ysaty
- Humaitá
- Olimpia
- San Cristóbal
- Santa María
- Sport Colonial
- Star’s Club
- Villa Hayes

=== Categoría Honor ===
- 3 de Mayo
- Campo Alto
- Filosofía
- Gaspar R. De Francia
- San Gerónimo
- Silvio Pettirossi
- Universidad Americana
- Villa Virginia

=== Categoría Primera ===
- Fomento de Fátima
- Colo Colo
