= Néstor Benítez =

Paraguayan footballer and coach (born 1943)

Personal information
- Full name: Cándido Néstor Benítez Caballero
- Date of birth: 4 September 1943 (age 83)
- Place of birth: Tacumbú, Asunción, Paraguay
- Position: Defender

Senior career*
Years	Team	Apps	(Gls)
1957–1962	Presidente Hayes	?	(?)
1964–1972	Olimpia	?	(?)
1972	Sportivo Luqueño	7	(0)
1976	Tembetary	?	(?)

International career
	Paraguay	?	(?)
- * Club domestic league appearances and goals

Cándido Néstor Benítez Caballero (born 4 September 1943 in Tacumbú, Paraguay) is a former football defender and coach.

== Career ==
He started his career at Presidente Hayes from his hometown, Tacumbú. From there, he was transferred to Olimpia Asunción which was coached then by the great Aurelio González. While in Olimpia, Benitez won a number of national championships and was called up to the Paraguay national football team in a few occasions. In 1972, he went to Sportivo Luqueño but was only able to play seven games due to an injury that kept him off the field for a few years until 1976 where he came back to play for C.A. Tembetary and retire in the same year.

Benítez holds a record of playing 72 consecutive and uninterrupted games for Olimpia.

As a coach, he managed teams like Independiente de Yaguarón, Olimpia de Itá, 6 de Enero de Lambaré and also worked in the youth divisions of Olimpia and Sol de América.

== Titles ==
Season	Team	Title
1965	Olimpia	Paraguayan 1st division
1968	Olimpia	Paraguayan 1st division
1971	Olimpia	Paraguayan 1st division
1976	C.A. Tembetary	Paraguayan 2nd division

== Awards ==
Season	Team	Award
1967	Olimpia	Diario ABC award: 1967 best left back in Paraguay
