= APF Beach Soccer Superliga =

Paraguayan beach football league

Superliga APF de Fútbol Playa
- Organising body: Paraguayan Football Association
- Founded: 2019
- Country: Paraguay
- Confederation: CONMEBOL
- Number of clubs: 10
- Level on pyramid: 1
- Current champions: Libertad
- Website: www.apf.org.py

The Superliga APF de Fútbol Playa (English: APF Beach Soccer Superliga) is a national beach soccer club tournament organized by the Paraguayan Football Association (APF) that has been operating since 2019. The champion team of each season represents Paraguay in the Copa Libertadores de Fútbol Playa.

== Teams ==
In the 2024 season, the fifth edition of this tournament, a total of 10 teams participate, all of them are located within the Greater Asunción area.

Club	City
13 de Junio	Areguá
24 de Setiembre	Areguá
Atlético San Miguel	Areguá
Garden Club	Luque
General Caballero CG	Luque
Libertad	Asunción
San Antonio	San Antonio
Silvio Pettirossi	Asunción
Sportivo Ameliano	Asunción
Sportivo Luqueño	Luque

== Champions ==
=== Performance by year ===
Superliga APF de Fútbol Playa
Year	Edition	Champions	Score	Runners-up
2019	I	San Bernardino	6-4	Areguá
2020	II	Suspended in the 5th Stage due to the COVID-19 pandemic.
2022	III	Presidente Hayes	6-4	Cerro Porteño
2023	IV	Libertad	-	San Antonio

=== Performance by club ===
Club	Champion	Runner-up	Winning years	Runner-up years
Libertad	1	0	2023	
Presidente Hayes	1	0	2022	
San Bernardino	1		2019	
San Antonio	0	1		2023
Cerro Porteño	0	1		2022
Areguá	0	1		2019

== See also ==
- Copa Libertadores de Fútbol Playa
- Paraguay national beach soccer team
- Paraguayan football league system
- Paraguayan Primera División
- Liga Premium de Futsal
- Football in Paraguay
