= 2024 Copa Libertadores de Futsal Femenina =

South American futsal competition

CONMEBOL Libertadores Futsal Femenina Bolivia 2024

Tournament details
- Host country: Bolivia
- City: Cochabamba
- Dates: July 2024
- Teams: 10 (from 10 associations)
- Venue: 1 (in 1 host city)

Final positions
- Champions: Stein Cascavel (2nd title)
- Runners-up: (Argentina) Racing
- Third place: (Bolivia) Always Ready
- Fourth place: (Paraguay) Exa Ysaty

The 2024 Copa Libertadores de Futsal Femenina was the ninth edition of the CONMEBOL Libertadores Futsal Femenina. It was organized by CONMEBOL and was held in Cochabamba, Bolivia in July 2024.

== Teams ==
Association	Team	Qualification method
Argentina	Racing	2023 Campeonato de Futsal Femenino AFA champions
Bolivia	Always Ready	2023 Campeonato Nacional de Futsal Femenino champions.
Brasil	Stein Cascavel	2023 Liga Nacional de Futsal Feminino champions
Chile	Universidad de Chile	2023 Torneo de Futsal Femenino champions
Colombia	Llaneros	2023 Torneo Femenino Colombiano
Ecuador	La Unión Futsal	2023 Torneo Femenino Ecuatoriano
Paraguay	Exa Ysaty	2023 Superliga de Futsal Femenino champions.
Perú	Deportivo JAP	2023 Primera División Futsal Femenino champions
Uruguay	Peñarol	2023 Campeonato Uruguayo Femenino de Fútbol Sala champions.
Venezuela	Tigres Futsal	2023 Liga FUTVE Futsal Femenina champions

== Draw ==
The draw of the tournament was held on 3 June 2024 at the headquarters of CONMEBOL in Luque, Paraguay. It determined the two groups, in the draw two seeds were established, one of them the team that will represent the organizing country, in this case Always Ready from Bolivia who was already in position A1, and the other will be the team that represents the last country to win said tournament, Stein Cascavel from Brazil, already located in position B1.
The remaining pots were made up as follows:

Pot 1 (seeds)	Pot 2	Pot 3	Pot 4
Racing Club; Exa Ysaty	Peñarol; VEN	COL; Deportivo JAP	Universidad de Chile; ECU

== Group stage ==
The competition is divided into two groups of five teams in each group, the competition system is a round of play against all the teams in the group. The top two teams in each group will advance to the semifinals, and the winner of each semifinal will play in the final to determine the tournament champion.

=== Group A ===
Pos	Team	Pld	W	D	L	GF	GA	GD	Pts	Qualification	(Argentina) RAC	ALW	LUF	TIG	JAP
1	(Argentina) Racing	4	4	0	0	12	4	+8	12	Semi-finals			3–1	3–1	
2	Always Ready (H)	4	3	0	1	17	5	+12	9	Semi-finals	2–3				9–0
3	La Unión Futsal	4	1	1	2	7	9	−2	4			1–4		1–1	
4	(Venezuela) Tigres Futsal	4	0	2	2	5	8	−3	2			1–2			2–2
5	Deportivo JAP	4	0	1	3	3	18	−15	1		0–3		1–4		

Updated to match(es) played on 26 July 2024. Source: CONMEBOL
Legend: Blue = home team win; Yellow = draw; Red = away team win.
(H) Hosts

=== Group B ===
Pos	Team	Pld	W	D	L	GF	GA	GD	Pts	Qualification	STE	EXA	LLA	PEÑ	UDC
1	Stein Cascavel	4	4	0	0	24	0	+24	12	Semi-finals		3–0	11–0		
2	Exa Ysaty	4	2	1	1	7	8	−1	7	Semi-finals				2–1	2–1
3	Llaneros	4	2	1	1	11	19	−8	7			3–3			5–4
4	Peñarol	4	1	0	3	6	12	−6	3		0–5		1–3		
5	Universidad de Chile	4	0	0	4	7	16	−9	0		0–5			2–4	

Updated to match(es) played on 26 July 2024. Source: CONMEBOL
Legend: Blue = home team win; Yellow = draw; Red = away team win.

== Final stage ==
=== 9th place match ===
27 July 2024
12:00

Deportivo JAP (Peru)	3–0	Universidad de Chile

Complejo Polideportivo Quillacollo

=== 7th place match ===
27 July 2024
14:00

Tigres Futsal (Venezuela)	4–2	(Uruguay) Peñarol

Complejo Polideportivo Quillacollo

=== 5th place match ===
28 July 2024
12:00

La Unión Futsal (Ecuador)	5–2	(Colombia) Llaneros

Complejo Polideportivo Quillacollo

=== Semi-finals ===
27 July 2024
16:00

Racing (Argentina)	3–1	(Paraguay) Exa Ysaty

Complejo Polideportivo Quillacollo
27 July 2024
18:30

Stein Cascavel (Brazil)	5–2	(Bolivia) Always Ready

Complejo Polideportivo Quillacollo

=== 3rd place match ===
28 July 2024
14:00

Exa Ysaty (Paraguay)	0–4	(Bolivia) Always Ready

Complejo Polideportivo Quillacollo

=== Final ===
28 July 2024
16:30

Racing (Argentina)	0–5	(Brazil) Stein Cascavel

Complejo Polideportivo Quillacollo

== See also ==
- Copa Libertadores de Futsal 2024 (Men's)
