= Categoría Honor de Futsal =

- Organising body: APF
- Founded: 2018; 8 years ago
- Country: Paraguay
- Confederation: CONMEBOL
- Number of clubs: 10
- Level on pyramid: Level 2
- Promotion to: Liga Premium
- Relegation to: Categoría Primera
- Current champions: Coronel Escurra (1st title) (2025)
- Most championships: 3 de Febrero FBC (2 titles)
- Website: apf.org.py/honor-futsal

The Categoría Honor de Futsal is the second highest professional futsal league in Paraguay. It started in 2018, is organized by the Paraguayan Football Association (APF), the country's governing body of football, and currently consists of 10 teams.
Both the champion and the runner-up of each season are promoted to the Liga Premium, the top division of Paraguayan futsal leagues system.

== Teams ==
The following 10 teams are competing in the league for the 2026 season:

| Club | Hometown |
|---|---|
| 3 de Noviembre | Asunción |
| Deportivo Humaitá | Asunción |
| Deportivo Sajonia | Asunción |
| Fernando de la Mora | Asunción |
| Filosofía | Asunción |
| San Gerónimo | Asunción |
| Sport Colonial | Asunción |
| Sportivo Ameliano | Asunción |
| Universidad Americana | Asunción |
| Villa Virginia | (Central Department) Lambaré |

== Champions ==
Categoría Honor de Futsal
| Edition | Year | Champion | Runner-up |
|---|---|---|---|
| I | 2018 | 3 de Febrero FBC | 3 de Mayo |
| II | 2019 | Santa María | La Furia Villeta |
| | 2020 | No championship due to the COVID-19 pandemic. | |
| III | 2021 | Presidente Hayes | Coronel Escurra |
| IV | 2022 | 3 de Febrero FBC | San Cristóbal |
| V | 2023 | Campo Alto | Presidente Hayes |
| VI | 2024 | Recoleta | 3 de Mayo |
| VII | 2025 | Coronel Escurra | Deportivo Santaní |

=== Performance by club ===
| Club | Champion | Runner-up | Champion years | Runner-up years |
|---|---|---|---|---|
| 3 de Febrero FBC | 2 | 0 | 2018, 2022 | |
| Presidente Hayes | 1 | 1 | 2021 | 2023 |
| Coronel Escurra | 1 | 1 | 2025 | 2021 |
| Santa María | 1 | 0 | 2019 | |
| Campo Alto | 1 | 0 | 2023 | |
| Recoleta | 1 | 0 | 2024 | |
| 3 de Mayo | 0 | 2 | | 2018, 2024 |
| La Furia Villeta | 0 | 1 | | 2019 |
| San Cristóbal | 0 | 1 | | 2022 |
| Deportivo Santaní | 0 | 1 | | 2025 |

== See also ==
- Paraguayan futsal league system
