= Valentin Tramontina =

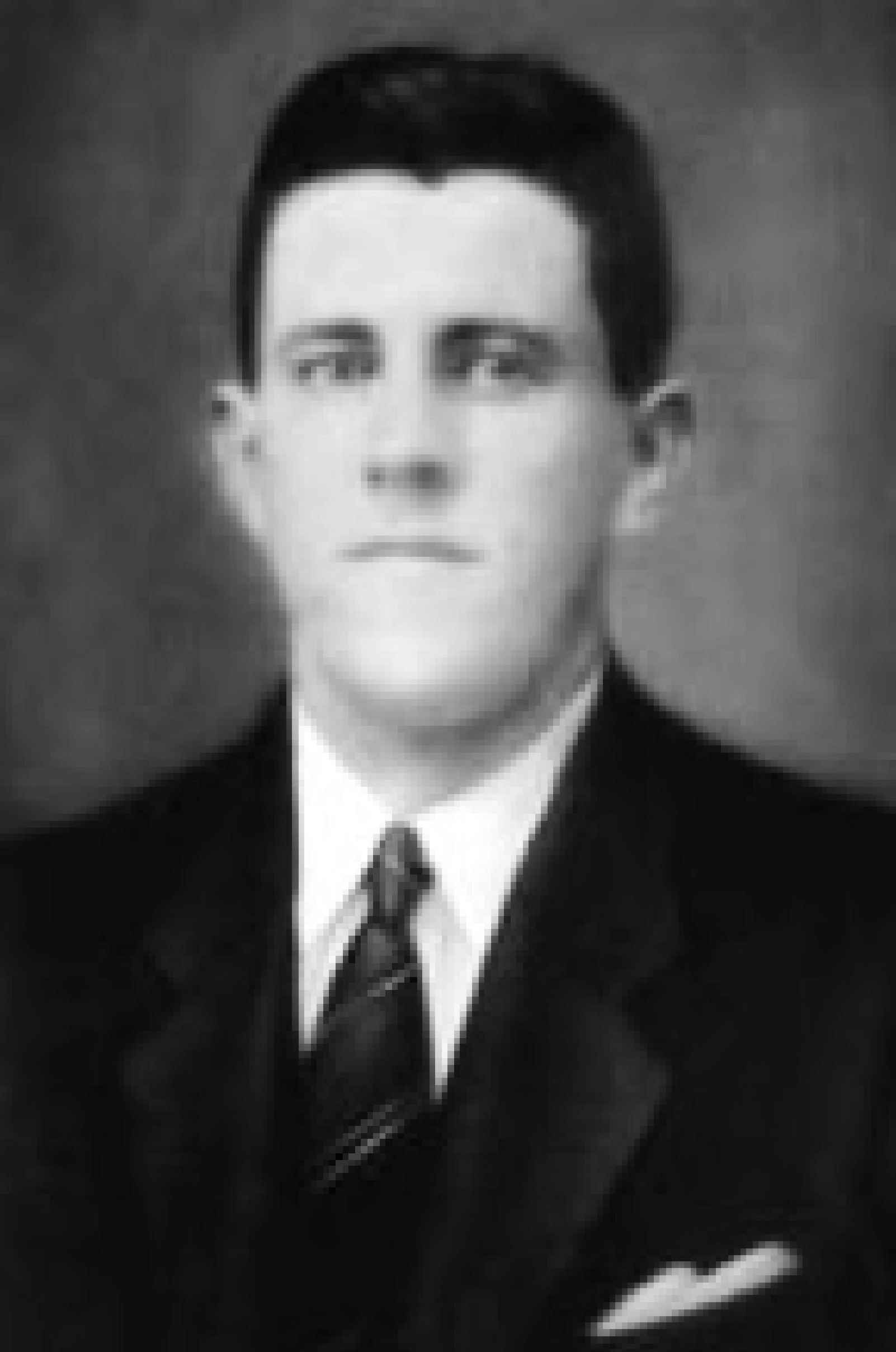
- Born: July 17, 1893; Bento Gonçalves, Rio Grande do Sul, Brazil
- Died: February 28, 1939; Rio Grande do Sul, Brazil
- Occupation: Businessman
- Spouse: Elisa de Cecco (m. 1920)
- Children: 3

Valentin Tramontina (July 17, 1893 – February 28, 1939) was a Brazilian blacksmith, businessman, manufacturer and the founder of the Brazilian company Tramontina. In 1911, three years after the railroad had arrived in Carlos Barbosa, mountainous region of Rio Grande do Sul, he came to town, coming from Bento Gonçalves. The small blacksmith who set up in the city, next to the pavilion where today there is a tire repair the War Office, made minor repairs as put horseshoes on horses.

== Biography ==
Valentin was an artisan colonist, born in Santa Bárbara, in the municipality of Bento Gonçalves, son of Italian immigrants from the village of Poffabro, municipality of Frisanco, in the region of Friuli-Venezia Giulia, northeastern Italy.

In 1911, he moved to Carlos Barbosa, in the mountain region of the state of Rio Grande do Sul, because the railroad meant a prospect of expansion. He set up a small workshop on a rented lot where small repairs were made, as well as making knives and horseshoes. After compulsory Brazilian military service, he resumed his activities and moved to a larger shed.

In 1930, Valentin released the knife "Santa Barbara" ref. No. 1, the product manufactured in greater quantity at the time. The smithy went through difficulties in the following years, culminating with the death of Valentin in 1939, who commanded the company for 28 years. After his death, Valentin's wife, Elisa Tramontina, took over the smithy.

== Personal life ==
In 1920, Tramontina married Elisa de Cecco. The couple had three children, Ivo, Henrique and Nilo.
