= Atlántida Sport Club =

Paraguayan football club

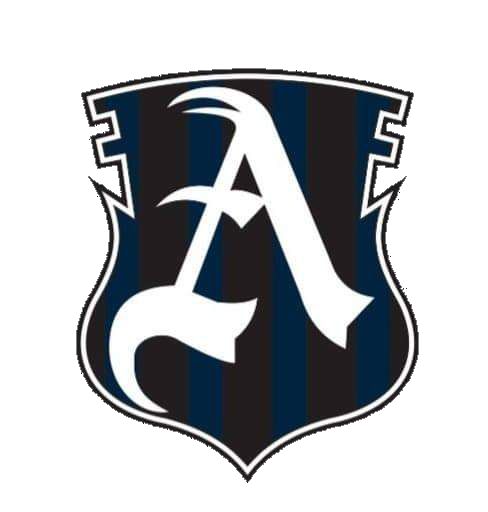
- Full name: Atlántida Sport Club
- Nicknames: Los Oceánicos (The Oceanics); El Negriazul (The Blue and Black); Los Arrancayuyos (The Arrancayuyos)
- Founded: December 23, 1906; 119 years ago
- Ground: Estadio Óscar Hugo Sosa
- Capacity: 7,000
- Chairman: Óscar Sosa
- Manager: Hugo Santacruz
- League: Primera División B Metropolitana
- 2025: 8th of 18
Home colours	Away colours

Atlántida Sport Club, known simply as Atlántida, Is a football club in Paraguay with its headquarters in the Barrio Obrero neighborhood of Asunción and its home ground in Nueva Asunción, Presidente Hayes Department. It was founded on December 23, 1906. It plays in the Tercera División of Paraguayan football.

Among his achievements are three runner-up positions in the First Division of the Paraguayan Football Association and two national championships in 1915 and 1917 in the now defunct Liga Centenario of Football.

The club intends to move its main headquarters to the Estadio Óscar Hugo Sosa in the city of Nueva Asunción, Presidente Hayes in the coming years, which will have an initial capacity for 18,000 spectators and a final capacity for 29,000 spectators, making it the largest football stadium in the Western Region of Paraguay.

== History ==
=== Early Years (1906-1996) ===
On December 23, 1906, Messrs. Ramón Pratt, Flaviano Díaz, Héctor Díaz, Lino Bogado, Miguel Ferraro, and Priest Antonio Tavarozzi - among others - met to found the Atlántida Sport Club, with Flaviano Díaz being elected the club's first president.

In that year 1906, other clubs appeared such as El Porvenir de Ypacaraí (May 18; first club in the interior) and Club Asunción (August 15).

As Atlántida grew, it became known as a wealthy club. Because of its financial status and location, the team was frequently compared to or associated with its neighbor, Sol de América, Nacional, and Cerro Porteño, all of them located in the Barrio Obrero.

It participated for the first time in the second championship of the then Paraguayan Football Association League, in 1907. In 1911, it finished runner-up in the First Division.

That year, however, due to problems between the clubs, Atlántida and others left the Paraguayan Football Association League to participate in the parallel, now-defunct Liga Centenario. They played there from 1912 to 1917, winning the national championship twice: in 1915 and 1917.

They returned to the Paraguayan Football Association League in 1918 and played in the First Division until 1925, when they finished last and were relegated. In 1927, they were crowned champions of the Intermediate Division and returned to the First Division.

They finished second again in 1936 and remained in the same division until 1950. The following year, they won the Second Division again and were promoted. Between 1952 and 1954, they would make their final forays into the top tier of Paraguayan football.

In 1957, they were relegated again, this time to the Second Division, the third and lowest tier of Paraguayan football at the time. In 1960, they were crowned champions of that division and returned to the Second Division.

In subsequent years, they were relegated to the Third Division, and in 1978, they were crowned champions of that division and achieved promotion. But he quickly returned to the lower division and won the title in that category again in 1981.

=== New Era (1997–2009) ===
In 1997, they were crowned champions of the first Second Division championship, the Fourth Division of Paraguayan football (before the creation of the División Intermedia as the new second division that year), and were promoted to Third Division.

In 2001, the club purchased approximately 50 hectares in Nueva Asunción (formerly Chaco'i) to build a new stadium there in the future.

After a few years, they were relegated again, and in the 2007 season, they finished runner-up in the Primera División C and were promoted once again to the Tercera División B (Paraguay) division in which He would play for two years, as he would finish in last place in the 2009 season.

=== Stagnation in the Fourth Division (2010–2017) ===
In the 2012 season they again won the title of Fourth Division champion by defeating Benjamín Aceval in the final; this way they would also achieve promotion to the Third Division.

In the 2013 season they finished seventh in the Third Division, in the following season They finished in second-to-last place, resulting in relegation to the Fourth Division.

In the 2015 season of the Primera Division C (fourth division), they finished in 4th place in the first phase, thus qualifying for the quarterfinals, but were eliminated there.

In the 2016 season of the Fourth Division, the club finished in third place in the first phase, thus qualifying for the second phase with a 0.50 point bonus. In that second phase, the club finished in third place in its group and failed to qualify for the final four. In the 2017 season the club managed to become champion of the Primera División C (fourth division) and was promoted after many years to the Primera División B Metropolitana (third division).

=== Promotion to the third division and move to Chaco (2018 - present) ===
In the 2018 season they finished in 10th place, with mixed results and a good average, thus ensuring their permanence in the category.

In the 2019 season they finished in 13th place, with results mixed.

In the 2020 season all football activities were suspended due to the COVID-19 pandemic, which significantly impacted the club's economy.

In the 2021 season, they finished in 13th place, with less than good results and close to relegation.

In September 2021, the club announced the start of construction on the Mar del Chaco Stadium, a new and modern sports complex in Nueva Asunción (10 km from Asunción). It will have an initial capacity for 7,000 spectators and in a second stage will have a final capacity for 18,000 spectators. The club has confirmed that it will move there once the construction work is completed around 2026. Therefore, its former grounds, the Flaviano Díaz Stadium in Barrio Obrero, will become its headquarters only, retaining only its futsal field and other minor infrastructure, while the grass field will disappear and be rented to a private company for the construction of a shopping center.

In the 2022 season finished in 3rd place, missing promotion by 2 points, after a good campaign throughout the year.

In the 2023 season they finished in 11th place, with mixed results, but with a good average.

In the 2024 season they had a very good performance, but finished in third place and were just 4 points away from promotion.

Since then, the club has maintained a good level within the third division, with a view to promotion to the Second Division in the future.

== Notable players ==
To appear in this section a player must have either:

- Played at least 125 games for the club.
- Set a club record or won an individual award while at the club.
- Been part of a national team at any time.
- Played in the first division of any other football association (outside of Paraguay).
- Played in a continental and/or intercontinental competition.

Paraguayan players

- (Paraguay) Paulo da Silva
- (Paraguay) Victor Caceres

Non-CONMEBOL players

- (Indonesia) Syahrizal Syahbuddin (2011)
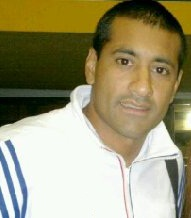
Paulo da Silva commenced his career at the club

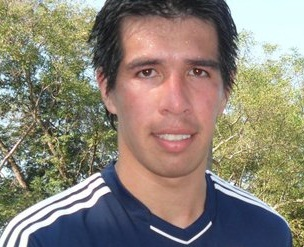
Victor Caceres debuted at the club in 2002 in Paraguay's third tier

== Honours ==
- Paraguayan First Division: 0

Runners-up (3): 1910, 1911, 1936

- Paraguayan Second Division: 2

1927, 1951

- Paraguayan Third Division: 3

1960, 1978, 1981
Runners-up (2): 1983, 1984

- Paraguayan Fourth Division: 3

1997, 2012, 2017
Runners-up (2): 2006, 2007

=== Another national championships ===
- Liga Centenario: 2

1915, 1917.
