= Héroes del Chaco Bridge =

Héroes del Chaco Bridge Puente Héroes del Chaco
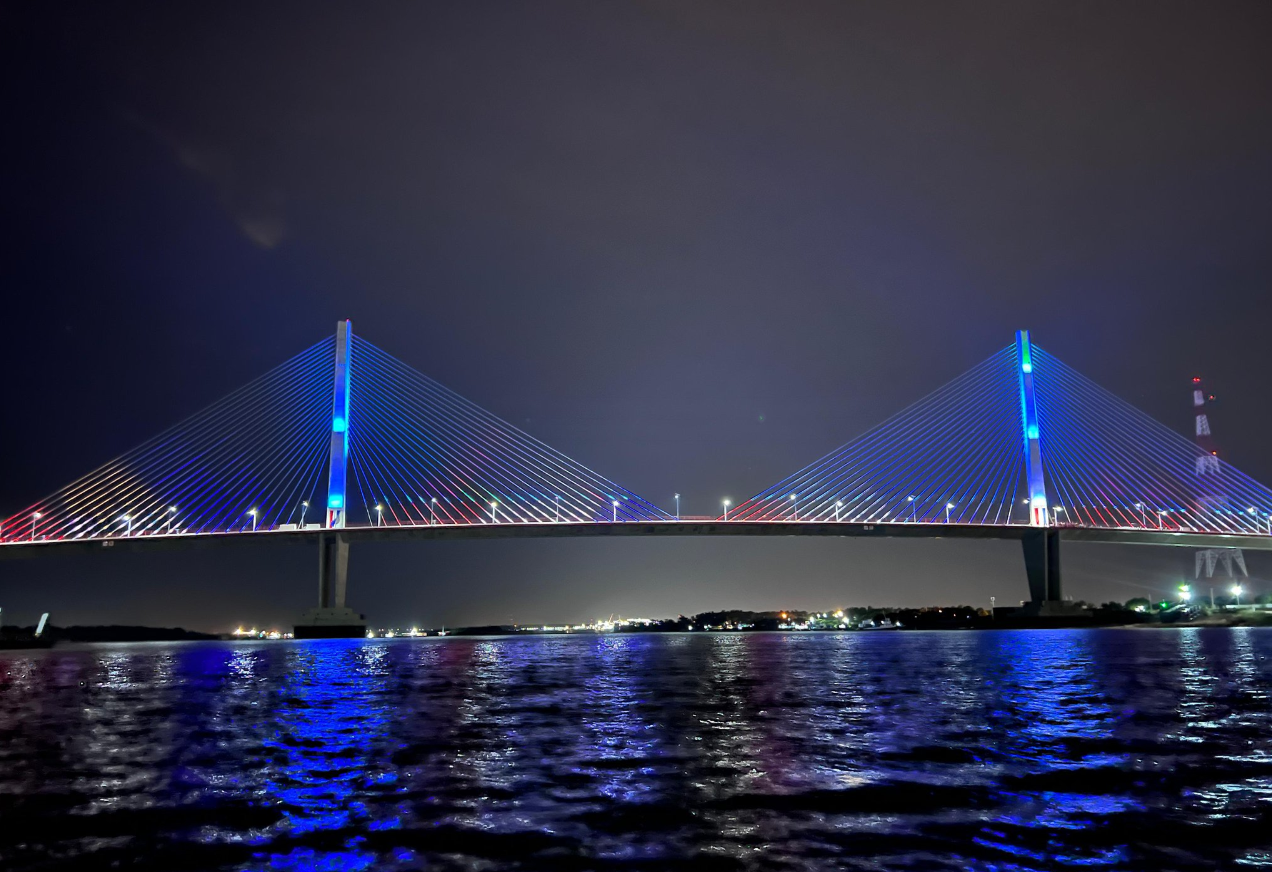
- Héroes del Chaco Bridge
- Coordinates: 25°14′34.1″S 57°35′30.2″W
- Crosses: Paraguay River
- Locale: Asunción and Nueva Asunción
- Preceded by: Remanso Bridge
- Followed by: General Belgrano Bridge

Characteristics
- Design: Cable-stayed bridge
- Total length: 300 metres (984 ft)
- Longest span: 2,609 metres (8,560 ft)

History
- Constructed by: CDD Construcciones and Constructora Heisecke
- Opened: March 4, 2024
- Inaugurated: March 3, 2024

Statistics
- Toll: ₲ 10,000 (Cat. 1) ₲ 17,000 (Cat. 2)

Location
- Interactive map of Héroes del Chaco Bridge

The Héroes del Chaco Bridge (Spanish: Puente Héroes del Chaco) is a cable-stayed bridge in Paraguay that connects the city of Asunción and Nueva Asunción. It crosses the Paraguay River in order to link the Paraguayan eastern and western regions. It was built to help decongest the Remanso Bridge, located eight km upstream. It will be the only large-span bridge in the capital, and the first to link it with the Western Region. It was officially inaugurated by President Santiago Peña on March 3, 2024.

== Etymology ==
Its name is a tribute to the combatants of the Chaco War and was selected through a citizen participation process. The symbolic act of laying the foundation stone took place on 12 June 2020, a date that commemorated the 85th anniversary of the Peace of Chaco, a protocol that ended this war between Bolivia and Paraguay.

== History ==
In December 2019, construction for the Héroes del Chaco Bridge was awarded to the Unión Consortium, made up of the companies CDD Construcciones S.A. and Constructora Heisecke S.A. The groundbreaking ceremony for the work took place on 12 June 2020, on the 85th anniversary of the signing of the Peace of Chaco.

The bridge has a total extension of 7,409 meters, starting from the Costanera de Asunción roundabout to the Nueva Asunción zone, which in turn will connect with Route PY09. It includes the road section of 4,800 meters and the structure section of 2,609 meters (600 meters of bridge (300 m long main span) and 2,009 meters of viaduct). The estimated initial execution period was 36 months.

Along with the Nanawa Bridge in Concepción and the Remanso Bridge in Mariano Roque Alonso, they are the only bridges that connect the two regions of Paraguay.
