= Deportivo Kansas =

Peruvian futsal club

- Full name: Deportivo Kansas F. C.
- Founded: unknown
- Dissolved: 2007
- Ground: Villa Deportiva Nacional coliseum
- League: División de Honor de Fútbol Sala
Home colours

Deportivo Kansas was a Peruvian futsal club that played in the División de Honor. The club was a runner-up in the 2003 season and division championships in both 2004 and 2006. In addition to winning the 2004 Copa Merconorte de Futsal, they placed second in the 2004 Copa Libertadores de Futsal; the farthest a Peruvian futsal club had come in that competition. The club dissolved in 2007.

== History ==
Deportivo Kansas
2004 Copa Merconorte champion
1st title
Champion team
(Peru) Edson Cáceres (GK)
(Peru) Juan Carlos Soto
(Peru) Ángel Guerrero
(Peru) Freddy Espinoza
(Peru) Iván Ubillos
(Peru) Luis Becerra
(Peru) Jorge Palomares
(Peru) Oscar Nalvarte
(Peru) Antonio Bayona
Manager: (Peru) Ernesto Carpo

The foundation date of the club is unknown. The first news about Deportivo Kansas appeared after the club finished second in the División de Honor and subsequently qualified for the Copa Libertadores de Futsal.

In 2004, the club participated in the 4th Copa Libertadores de Futsal in Quito. Deportivo Kansas started the competition in Group B, and eventually finished in second place, qualifying for the semifinals. In the semifinals, Kansas defeated CUN (Colombia) and then won the title by defeating Samanes de Aragua (Venezuela). This qualified them for the Copa Libertadores Final.

The Copa Libertadores Final took place in Lima, in the PUCP Coliseum, on December 18 and 19. Kansas lost both matches against Malwee/Jaragua (Brazil).

In the domestic league, Kansas won its first title and qualified for the 2005 Copa Libertadores.

In 2005, the club participated in the 5th Copa Libertadores held in Lima. From there, Kansas started participating in Group B where they faced Malwee/Jaragua again. The club finished 4th (of 5 teams) and was eliminated. Kansas finished the domestic league without titles.

In 2006, Kansas again won the domestic league, but because of administrative troubles, the club didn't take part in the 2007 Copa Libertadores and then retired from the domestic league.

== Managers ==
- (Peru) Ernesto Crespo (during 2004)

== Titles ==
=== International ===
Tournament	Titles	runner-up	Years champion	Years runner-up
Copa Libertadores de Futsal	0	1	-	2004
Copa Merconorte de Futsal	1	0	2004	-

=== National ===
Tournament	Titles	runner-up	Years champion	Years runner-up
División de Honor	2	1	2004, 2006	2003

== See also ==
- UEFA Futsal Champions League
