= Humaitá F.B.C. =

Paraguayan football club

- Founded: February 19, 1932
- Ground: Estadio Pioneros de Corumba Cué, Mariano Roque Alonso, Paraguay
- Capacity: 7,000
- Chairman: Paulo Cesar Pico
- Manager: Oscar Dominguez
- League: Cuarta División
- 2022: 2° (Promoted)
Home colours	Away colours

Humaitá F.B.C. is a Paraguayan football club from the city of Mariano Roque Alonso, in the Gran Asunción area. The club was founded in 1932 and currently plays in the Primera División B Metropolitana.

== History ==
The club took its name from the historic Paraguayan city of Humaitá.

It is the third oldest team from Mariano Roque Alonso and won 12 titles from the regional league of that city, before joining the Liga Paraguaya de Futbol and participating in the lower divisions with other metropolitan area teams. Its biggest achievement was promotion to the Paraguayan first division in 1993. It competed in the first division for three years before being relegated to the second division.

== Honours ==
- Paraguayan Second Division: 1

Champions: 1993

- Paraguayan Third Division: 1

Champions: 1988

- Paraguayan Fourth Division: 1

Champions: 2001

- Paraguayan Second Division: 1

Runners-up (1): 1991.

== Other disciplines ==
=== Futsal ===
The club's futsal division plays in the Liga Premium, the first division of the Paraguayan futsal league system.
