= 2018 Copa Libertadores Femenina de Futsal =

Copa CONMEBOL Libertadores Femenina de Futsal Paraguay 2018
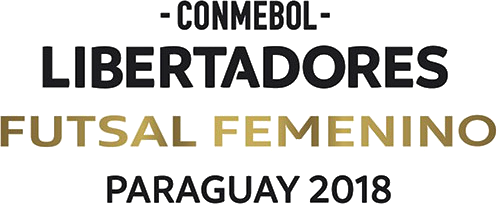

Tournament details
- Host country: Paraguay
- City: Luque
- Dates: 7–14 October 2018
- Teams: 10 (from 10 associations)
- Venue: 1 (in 1 host city)

Final positions
- Champions: (Brazil) Leões Da Serra (1st title)
- Runners-up: (Paraguay) Sport Colonial
- Third place: (Argentina) San Lorenzo
- Fourth place: (Colombia) Lyon

Tournament statistics
- Matches played: 24
- Goals scored: 170 (7.08 per match)

The 2018 Copa CONMEBOL Libertadores Femenina de Futsal was the 5th edition of the Copa Libertadores Femenina de Futsal, South America's premier women's club futsal tournament organized by CONMEBOL.

The tournament was held at Luque, Paraguay between 7–14 October 2018.

Leões Da Serra defeated Sport Colonial 0–4 in the final to win their first title. San Lorenzo defeated Lyon on penalties (after a 2–2 draw following extra time) to finish third. Unochapecó were the defending champions, but did not qualify for this edition.

== Teams ==
The competition is contested by 10 teams: one entry from each of the ten CONMEBOL associations.

Association	Team	Qualifying method
Argentina	San Lorenzo	2017 Argentine champions
Bolivia	Atlantes	2017 Bolivian champions
Brazil	Leões Da Serra	2017 Taça Brasil de Futsal Feminino champions
Chile	Palestino	2018 Chilean champions
Colombia	Lyon	2018 Colombian champions
Ecuador	Santo Domingo IK9	2018 Ecuadorian champions
Paraguay (hosts)	Sport Colonial	2017 Paraguayan champions
Peru	UNMSM	2018 Peruvian champions
Uruguay	Nacional	2017 Uruguayan champions
Venezuela	Aquiles Nazoa	2018 Venezuelan champions

== Venues ==
The tournament was played at the Polideportivo del Comité Olímpico Paraguayo in Luque.

== Draw ==
The draw of the tournament was held on 13 September 2018, 11:00 PYT (UTC−4) at the headquarters of the Paraguayan Football Association in Asunción. The 10 teams were drawn into two groups of five. The following two teams were seeded:

- Group A: representatives of the host association, Sport Colonial (Paraguay)
- Group B: representatives of the association of the 2017 Copa Libertadores Femenina de Futsal champions, Leões Da Serra (Brazil)

The remaining teams were seeded based on the results of their association in the 2017 Copa Libertadores Femenina de Futsal.

Seeds	Pot 1	Pot 2
(Paraguay) Sport Colonial (Position A1); (Brazil) Leões Da Serra (Position B1)	(Venezuela) Aquiles Nazoa; (Chile) Palestino; (Argentina) San Lorenzo; (Uruguay) Nacional	(Colombia) Lyon; (Ecuador) Santo Domingo IK9; (Bolivia) Atlantes; (Peru) UNMSM

== Squads ==
Each team has to submit a squad of 14 players, including a minimum of two goalkeepers (Regulations Article 33).

== Group stage ==
The top two teams of each group advance to the semi-finals. The teams are ranked according to points (3 points for a win, 1 point for a draw, 0 points for a loss). If tied on points, tiebreakers are applied in the following order (Regulations Article 21):

1. Results in head-to-head matches between tied teams (points, goal difference, goals scored);
2. Goal difference in all matches;
3. Goals scored in all matches;
4. Drawing of lots.

All times are local, PYST (UTC−3).

=== Group A ===
Pos	Team	Pld	W	D	L	GF	GA	GD	Pts	Qualification
1	(Paraguay) Sport Colonial (H)	4	4	0	0	21	4	+17	12	Semi-finals
2	(Argentina) San Lorenzo	4	2	1	1	8	5	+3	7	Semi-finals
3	(Ecuador) Santo Domingo IK9	4	1	2	1	15	15	0	5	
4	(Uruguay) Nacional	4	1	0	3	8	17	−9	3	
5	(Peru) UNMSM	4	0	1	3	4	15	−11	1	

Source: CONMEBOL
(H) Hosts
7 October 2018
18:00

San Lorenzo (Argentina)	2–0	(Peru) UNMSM
	Report

Polideportivo del Comité Olímpico Paraguayo, Luque
7 October 2018
20:00

Sport Colonial (Paraguay)	6–0	(Uruguay) Nacional
	Report

Polideportivo del Comité Olímpico Paraguayo, Luque

8 October 2018
18:00

Santo Domingo IK9 (Ecuador)	6–3	(Uruguay) Nacional
	Report

Polideportivo del Comité Olímpico Paraguayo, Luque
8 October 2018
20:00

San Lorenzo (Argentina)	0–3	(Paraguay) Sport Colonial
	Report

Polideportivo del Comité Olímpico Paraguayo, Luque

9 October 2018
18:00

UNMSM (Peru)	3–3	(Ecuador) Santo Domingo IK9
	Report

Polideportivo del Comité Olímpico Paraguayo, Luque
9 October 2018
20:00

Nacional (Uruguay)	0–4	(Argentina) San Lorenzo
	Report

Polideportivo del Comité Olímpico Paraguayo, Luque

10 October 2018
18:00

Santo Domingo IK9 (Ecuador)	2–2	(Argentina) San Lorenzo
	Report

Polideportivo del Comité Olímpico Paraguayo, Luque
10 October 2018
20:00

UNMSM (Peru)	0–5	(Paraguay) Sport Colonial
	Report

Polideportivo del Comité Olímpico Paraguayo, Luque

11 October 2018
18:00

Nacional (Uruguay)	5–1	(Peru) UNMSM
	Report

Polideportivo del Comité Olímpico Paraguayo, Luque
11 October 2018
20:00

Sport Colonial (Paraguay)	7–4	(Ecuador) Santo Domingo IK9
	Report

Polideportivo del Comité Olímpico Paraguayo, Luque

=== Group B ===
Pos	Team	Pld	W	D	L	GF	GA	GD	Pts	Qualification
1	(Brazil) Leões Da Serra	4	4	0	0	37	2	+35	12	Semi-finals
2	(Colombia) Lyon	4	3	0	1	26	8	+18	9	Semi-finals
3	(Bolivia) Atlantes	4	2	0	2	13	24	−11	6	
4	(Chile) Palestino	4	1	0	3	8	19	−11	3	
5	(Venezuela) Aquiles Nazoa	4	0	0	4	8	39	−31	0	

Source: CONMEBOL
7 October 2018
14:00

Leões Da Serra (Brazil)	14–1	(Venezuela) Aquiles Nazoa
	Report

Polideportivo del Comité Olímpico Paraguayo, Luque
7 October 2018
16:00

Palestino (Chile)	0–3	(Bolivia) Atlantes
	Report

Polideportivo del Comité Olímpico Paraguayo, Luque

8 October 2018
14:00

Lyon (Colombia)	10–2	(Venezuela) Aquiles Nazoa
	Report

Polideportivo del Comité Olímpico Paraguayo, Luque
8 October 2018
16:00

Palestino (Chile)	0–7	(Brazil) Leões Da Serra
	Report

Polideportivo del Comité Olímpico Paraguayo, Luque

9 October 2018
14:00

Atlantes (Bolivia)	3–8	(Colombia) Lyon
	Report

Polideportivo del Comité Olímpico Paraguayo, Luque
9 October 2018
16:00

Aquiles Nazoa (Venezuela)	2–8	(Chile) Palestino
	Report

Polideportivo del Comité Olímpico Paraguayo, Luque

10 October 2018
14:00

Lyon (Colombia)	7–0	(Chile) Palestino
	Report

Polideportivo del Comité Olímpico Paraguayo, Luque
10 October 2018
16:00

Atlantes (Bolivia)	0–13	(Brazil) Leões Da Serra
	Report

Polideportivo del Comité Olímpico Paraguayo, Luque

11 October 2018
14:00

Leões Da Serra (Brazil)	3–1	(Colombia) Lyon
	Report

Polideportivo del Comité Olímpico Paraguayo, Luque
11 October 2018
16:00

Aquiles Nazoa (Venezuela)	3–7	(Bolivia) Atlantes
	Report

Polideportivo del Comité Olímpico Paraguayo, Luque

== Knockout stage ==
In the semi-finals and final, extra time and penalty shoot-out are used to decide the winner if necessary (Regulations Article 22).

=== Bracket ===
Semi-finals
13 October
(Paraguay) Sport Colonial	4
(Colombia) Lyon	1
13 October
(Brazil) Leões Da Serra	8
(Argentina) San Lorenzo	1

Final
14 October
(Paraguay) Sport Colonial	0
(Brazil) Leões Da Serra	4
Third place
14 October
(Colombia) Lyon	2 (0)
(Argentina) San Lorenzo (p)	2 (2)

=== Semi-finals ===
13 October 2018
16:00

Leões Da Serra (Brazil)	8–1	(Argentina) San Lorenzo
	Report

Polideportivo del Comité Olímpico Paraguayo, Luque
13 October 2018
18:00

Sport Colonial (Paraguay)	4–1	(Colombia) Lyon
	Report

Polideportivo del Comité Olímpico Paraguayo, Luque

=== Third place match ===
14 October 2018
16:00

Lyon (Colombia)	2–2	(Argentina) San Lorenzo
	Report
Penalties
	0–2

Polideportivo del Comité Olímpico Paraguayo, Luque

=== Final ===
14 October 2018
18:00

Sport Colonial (Paraguay)	0–4	(Brazil) Leões Da Serra
	Report

Polideportivo del Comité Olímpico Paraguayo, Luque
