= Jorge Brítez =

Paraguayan footballer (born 1981)

Personal information
- Full name: Jorge Orlando Brítez
- Date of birth: 2 February 1981 (age 45)
- Place of birth: Villarrica, Paraguay
- Height: 1.81 m (5 ft 11 in)
- Position: Midfielder

Youth career
- Club Presidente Hayes

Senior career*
Years	Team	Apps	(Gls)
1999	Club Presidente Hayes		
1999–2000	Real Valladolid	26	(0)
2000–2001	SC Braga	6	(0)
2001–2002	Libertad		
2003	Tacuary	13	(0)
2003–2004	Maccabi Haifa	13	(0)
2004	Moreirense	11	(0)
2004–2005	Olimpia		
2005	Tacuary		
2006	Nacional		
2007–2010	Cerro Porteño	124	(14)
2010	Club Rubio Ñu	3	(0)
2010	Panserraikos	1	(0)
2011	Deportivo Pereira	14	(1)
2011	Guaraní	8	(0)
2012	Sportivo Luqueño	18	(0)
2012	Club Rubio Ñu	15	(1)
2013	Sportivo Carapeguá	20	(0)
2013–2015	Fernando de la Mora		

International career
2003–2007	Paraguay	2	(0)
- * Club domestic league appearances and goals

Jorge Brítez (born 2 February 1981) is a former Paraguayan footballer.

== Career ==
=== Overview ===
Brítez played in the 1999 FIFA World Youth Championship in Nigeria as well as the 2001 FIFA World Youth Championship in Argentina. There, he was spotted by officials from a Spanish club and moved on to Europe but never fulfilled his potential there ultimately returning to his native Paraguay. Stints abroad in Israel and Portugal did not bear any fruit for Brítez' career for the second time so he returned to Paraguay. On 30 August 2010, he signed with the Super League Greece club Panserraikos According to Paraguayan media, tired of the abuse and conflict between managers, coaches and players of Panserraikos, Brítez terminated his contract with Panserraikos on 25 October 2010 and returned to Paraguay. Another website stated that Jorge Britez returned to Paraguay after annulling Panserraikos contract. Britez's agent Miguel Gonzalez Zelada explained that "With Britez we arrived at an agreement with the Greek club to cancel the contract, since he has not adapted, he does not like the treatment he received from the directors and the management. Now we are going to see where he can train, and by the end of the year find a club to play at,". On 20 December 2010, Brítez revealed that his manager is in negotiations with Peruvian football club Juan Aurich. On 4 January 2011, Peruvian media announced that the player signed with Peruvian football club Juan Aurich.

=== Stint in Israel ===
After playing with the Paraguay national team, Jorge was spotted by scouts of Maccabi Haifa. He joined the squad along with Dante López but the two had trouble acclimating to life in Israel. Britez was expected to take on a defensive midfield role but Haifa officials later found out that that was not his natural position. He ended up finishing his only season in Israel and moving on to play club football in Portugal.
