= Tramontina =

Brazilian manufacturer of kitchenware

Tramontina S.A.
- Type: Sociedade Anônima
- Industry: Kitchenware
- Founded: 1911; 115 years ago
- Founder: Valentin Tramontina
- Headquarters: Carlos Barbosa, RS, Brazil
- Area served: Worldwide
- Key people: Marcos Tramontina (CEO); Eduardo Scomazzon (President); Ricardo Tramontina (Vice-president); Ildo Paludo (Board Member); Joselito Gusso (Board Member); Inácio Chies (Board Member); Clovis Tramontina (Advisory Board Member)
- Products: Cookware; Flatware; Tableware; Porcelain; Kitchen tools Kitchen accessories Home appliances Furniture; Hand tools Power tools
- Revenue: ▲ R$ 10.1 billion (2021)
- Number of employees: ▲10.000
- Website: global.tramontina.com

Tramontina is a family-run Brazilian metallurgical company founded in 1911 and headquartered in the city of Carlos Barbosa, Rio Grande do Sul.

The company manufactures a mix of more than 22 thousand items, including cutlery, cookware, porcelain, home appliances, and tools for agriculture, gardening, industrial work, automotive maintenance, civil construction, and electrical repair. Tramontina is the most traditional cutlery in Brazil and the largest company of such nature in the Americas. Today the company has 8 manufacturing units, six in Rio Grande do Sul, one in Pernambuco and one in India. It has more than 10,000 employees and its products are sold in 120 countries.

== History ==
The company was founded in 1911 by Valentin Tramontina, the son of Italian immigrants from the village of Poffabro, town of Frisanco, in the Friuli region of northeast Italy. The business started from a small blacksmith shop, where he carried out repairs for industries in the region, in addition to shoeing horses.

=== Focus on cutlery ===
In 1925, Valentin began the artisanal production of pocket knives with bone handles. This was the starting point for Tramontina's cutlery activities, which he continued to run until 1939, the year in which he passed away.

From that year onwards, Valentin's wife, Elisa de Cecco Tramontina, took over the company's activities. She would personally sell the factory's production in regional markets and in Porto Alegre, the capital of Rio Grande do Sul.

=== The transformation in S.A. ===
In 1949, business began to grow under the management of Ivo Tramontina –son of Valentin–, and Ruy J. Scomazzon, who became part of the company. Investments in new technologies, combined with the beginning of the steel rolling process, boosted the growth of the company which, in 1961, became an S.A. The year was also marked by the death of Elisa Tramontina.

In the following decades, Tramontina consolidated itself in the Brazilian market. New factories were opened and new products began to be produced, focusing on diversification, in addition to pocket knives, knives, cutlery and tools, which today total a portfolio of more than 22 thousand items. In 1969, the company made its first export to Chile.

=== Growth and internationalization ===
From the 90s onwards, the consumer market expanded and the portfolio was reinforced with stainless steel sinks and bowls, plastic chairs and tables. Growth abroad following the opening of its own unit in the United States in 1986 led Tramontina to establish itself in countries in America, Europe and Asia, including China. More recently, it reaches Oceania and Africa.

From 1992 until 2021, Ivo's son, Clovis Tramontina, was responsible for presiding over Tramontina's Board of Directors. In 2022, Eduardo Scomazzon, Ruy's son, assumed the presidency of the Board. In 2025, the brand updated its visual identity, with a new logo and colors.

== Manufacturing units ==
The Tramontina Group has manufacturing units, Distribution Centers, Regional Sales Offices and Official Stores, in addition to the Central Office and other operational and service units.

=== Tramontina Cutelaria ===
Founded in 1911, located in Carlos Barbosa, produces knives (kitchen, professional sports), pocket knives, scissors, skewers, everyday cutlery, kitchen utensils and pots, shapes and aluminum non-stick sleepers. In 2026, it opened a branch in Mexico to produce frying pans.

=== Tramontina Delta ===
Founded in 1998, located in Recife, produces plastic chairs, tables and toys, shelves, vases, trash cans, organizing boxes, drawers and armchairs made of injected or rotomolded plastic. Furthermore, from 2022, in the city of Moreno (Pernambuco), it produces porcelain plates, cups, mugs, saucers, bowls, platters and salad bowls.

=== Tramontina Eletrik ===
Founded in 1976, located in Carlos Barbosa, produces accessories for conduits, switches, sockets, junction boxes, showers, extension cords, weatherproof devices, lighting, custom aluminum injection and products for explosive atmospheres.

=== Tramontina Farroupilha ===
Founded in 1971, located in Farroupilha, produces cookware, tableware, cutlery and utensils for stainless steel kitchens, professional kitchens, thermoses and portable appliances.

=== Tramontina Garibaldi ===
Founded in 1963, located in Garibaldi, produces hammers, hatchets, wrenches, screwdrivers, pliers, pincers, chisels, planes, levels, saws and handsaws, industrial tools and metal organizers for the industrial and automotive sectors, professional tools for construction and hand tools for domestic use.

=== Tramontina Multi ===
Founded in 1982, also located in Carlos Barbosa, produced wheelbarrows, rakes, hoes, picks, shovels, scythes, sickles, rakes, diggers, lawn mowers, gardening and pruning shears, drivable equipment, tools and equipment for gardening, agriculture and civil construction.

=== Tramontina TEEC ===
Founded in 1996, also located in Carlos Barbosa, produces sinks, vats, tanks, mixers, hoods, cooktops, ovens, trash cans, plant pots and accessories in stainless steel, refrigerators, dishwashers, wine cellars and beer centers.

=== Aequs Cookware Products Limited (ACPL) ===
Founded in 2025, also called Tramontina India, located in Hubballi, India, is a joint venture that produces stainless steel and aluminum pots and pans.

== Governance ==
Tramontina's governance structure is led by the Board of Directors, the company's highest decision-making body and responsible for defining strategic guidelines, supervising implementation and guiding decisions aimed at generating long-term value. In 2025, Tramontina updated its corporate governance with the appointment of a Corporate Board.

=== Members of the Board of Directors ===
- Eduardo Scomazzon (President)
- Ricardo Tramontina (Vice President)
- Ildo Paludo
- Joselito Gusso
- Inácio Chies
- Clovis Tramontina (Advisory Advisor)

=== Members of the Corporate Board ===
- Marcos Tramontina (CEO)
- Giovane Capitani (Administrative/Finance)
- Cesar Umberto Vieceli (Domestic Market)
- Jandir Vitório Brock (International Market)

Businessman Clovis Tramontina presided over the company from 1992 until 2021. Grandson of founders Valentin and Elisa Tramontina and son of Ivo and Laura Tramontina, he was born in 1955 in the municipality of Carlos Barbosa. In 2021, Clovis published his autobiography, entitled “Passion, Strength and Courage”.

In 2022, Eduardo Scomazzon, son of Ruy J. Scomazzon, assumed the presidency of Tramontina's Board of Directors. In 2025, Marcos Tramontina, son of Clovis Tramontina, took over as CEO of the Group.

== Distribution ==
In the Brazilian market, the company has five Distribution Centers – in Barueri, Belém, Carlos Barbosa, Goiânia, and Simões Filho, and five Regional Sales Offices – in Belo Horizonte, Curitiba, Porto Alegre, Recife, and Rio de Janeiro.

=== International Units ===
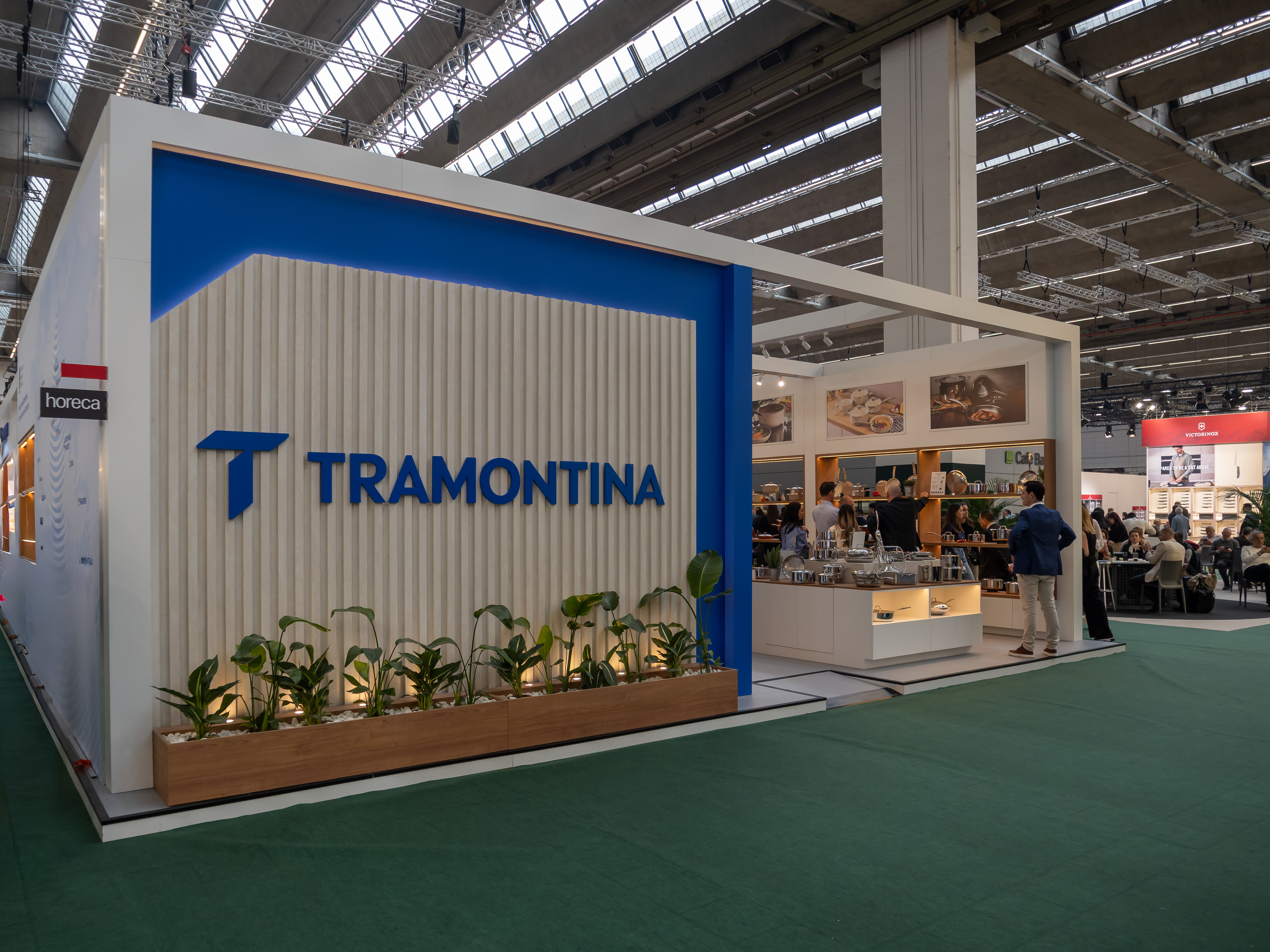
Tramontina exhibition booth at Ambiente 2026, Frankfurt am Main

Outside of Brazil, Tramontina has Distribution Centers and Sales Offices in South Africa, Germany, Australia, Chile, Uruguay, Argentina, China, Singapore, Colombia, the United Arab Emirates, Ecuador, United States, Mexico, Panama, Peru, India, United Kingdom, Canada, Spain, Japan and Latvia, in addition to sales representatives operating in other countries.

=== Tramontina Store ===
The company has two factory stores in Rio Grande do Sul assembled exclusively with brand products, in the city of Carlos Barbosa and another in Farroupilha. The largest of them is in Carlos Barbosa, the company's headquarters city, with more than 4 thousand square meters.

In 2013, Tramontina opened its first concept store in the city of Rio de Janeiro, the Tramontina Store. According to Clovis Tramontina, president of the company, the city was chosen due to its hosting of international proportion such as the 2014 FIFA World Cup and the 2016 Summer Olympics. According to him, the store will be a kind of laboratory where products will be offered first-hand to customers. In 2015, a second store in Brazil was inaugurated in Salvador, and the first outside Brazil was opened in Santiago, Chile. Today, there are more than 20 stores in Brazil, 7 in Peru, 5 Colombia, 1 in South Africa, 1 in Bolivia and 1 in Dubai.

In 2014, the brand began selling operations via e-commerce for its line of wooden furniture and in 2018, the brand launched its official store online, Tramontina Store.

== Sustainability ==
Tramontina has an Environmental Management Program, created to formalize practices and comply with sustainable development technologies. The brand adopts its own systems to care for the environment, such as the treatment of waste and liquid effluents, which prevents the disposal of harmful substances, which earned the company ISO 14001 certification.

Tramontina adopts ESG governance criteria and publishes an annual Sustainability Report, detailing circular economy strategies, waste management, water efficiency and the use of renewable energy.

The company maintains policies and committees aimed at monitoring the compliance of its operations, while its research and development activities focus on technological innovations aimed at process efficiency and sustainability.

== Sports ==
Tramontina also sponsors Carlos Barbosa's Futsal team Associação Carlos Barbosa de Futsal (ACBF), the largest team in Brazil.
