= Eustacio Chamorro =

Paraguayan footballer

Personal information
- Place of birth: Paraguay
- Position: Defender

Senior career*
Years	Team	Apps	(Gls)
- Club Presidente Hayes

International career
- Paraguay
- * Club domestic league appearances and goals

Eustacio Chamorro was a Paraguayan football defender who played for Paraguay in the 1930 FIFA World Cup. He also played for Club Presidente Hayes. Chamorro is deceased.
