= 2017 Copa Libertadores Femenina de Futsal =

Copa CONMEBOL Libertadores Femenina de Futsal Paraguay 2017
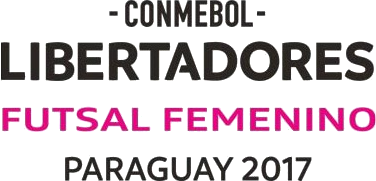

Tournament details
- Host country: Paraguay
- City: Luque
- Dates: 15–22 July 2017
- Teams: 10 (from 10 associations)
- Venue: 1 (in 1 host city)

Final positions
- Champions: (Brazil) Unochapecó (2nd title)
- Runners-up: (Paraguay) Sport Colonial
- Third place: (Venezuela) Trujillanos
- Fourth place: (Chile) Palestino

Tournament statistics
- Matches played: 27
- Goals scored: 161 (5.96 per match)
- Top scorer: (Paraguay) Paola Brítez
- Best player: (Paraguay) Paola Brítez

The 2017 Copa CONMEBOL Libertadores Femenina de Futsal was the 4th edition of the Copa Libertadores Femenina de Futsal, South America's premier women's club futsal tournament organized by CONMEBOL.

The tournament was hosted by Paraguay and played from 15 to 22 July 2017.

== Teams ==
The competition was contested by 10 teams: one entry from each of the ten CONMEBOL associations.

Association	Team	Qualifying method
Argentina	San Lorenzo	2016 Argentine champions
Bolivia	Atlantes	2016 Bolivian champions
Brazil	Unochapecó	2016 Taça Brasil de Futsal Feminino champions
Chile	Palestino	2017 Chilean champions
Colombia	Real Antioquia	2017 Colombian champions
Ecuador	Cumanda Agua Lluvia	2017 Ecuadorian champions
Paraguay (hosts)	Sport Colonial	2016 Paraguayan champions
Peru	Municipalidad San Borja	2017 Peruvian champions
Uruguay	Río Negro City	2016 Uruguayan champions
Venezuela	Trujillanos	2017 Venezuelan champions

== Venues ==
The matches were played at the Polideportivo del Comité Olímpico Paraguayo in Luque.

== Draw ==
The draw of the tournament was held on 28 June 2017, 11:30 PYT (UTC−4), at the conference room of Estadio Defensores del Chaco in Asunción. The 10 teams were drawn into two groups of five containing one team from each of the four seeding pots. The following two teams were seeded:

- Group A: champions of the host association, Sport Colonial (Paraguay)
- Group B: representatives of the association of the 2016 Copa Libertadores Femenina de Futsal champions, Unochapecó (Brazil)

The other teams were seeded based on the results of their association in the 2016 Copa Libertadores Femenina de Futsal.

Seeds	Pot 1	Pot 2	Pot 3	Pot 4
(Paraguay) Sport Colonial; (Brazil) Unochapecó	(Venezuela) Trujillanos; (Argentina) San Lorenzo	(Uruguay) Río Negro City; (Colombia) Real Antioquia (Note: The representative of Colombia was not known at the time of the draw.)	(Chile) Palestino; (Peru) Municipalidad San Borja	(Ecuador) Cumanda Agua Lluvia; (Bolivia) Atlantes

== Squads ==
Each team had to submit a squad of 14 players, including a minimum of two goalkeepers (Regulations Article 4.1).

== Match officials ==
A total of 16 referees were appointed for the tournament.

== Group stage ==
The top two teams of each group advanced to the semi-finals, while the teams in third, fourth and fifth advanced to the fifth place, seventh place, and ninth place play-offs respectively. The teams were ranked according to points (3 points for a win, 1 point for a draw, 0 points for a loss). If tied on points, tiebreakers were applied in the following order (Regulations Article 6.2):

1. Results in head-to-head matches between tied teams (points, goal difference, goals scored);
2. Goal difference in all matches;
3. Goals scored in all matches;
4. Drawing of lots.

All times were local, PYT (UTC−4).

=== Group A ===
Pos	Team	Pld	W	D	L	GF	GA	GD	Pts	Qualification
1	(Paraguay) Sport Colonial (H)	4	3	1	0	14	5	+9	10	Knockout stage
2	(Venezuela) Trujillanos	4	3	1	0	14	7	+7	10	Knockout stage
3	(Uruguay) Río Negro City	4	2	0	2	10	9	+1	6	Fifth place play-off
4	(Ecuador) Cumanda Agua Lluvia	4	1	0	3	11	16	−5	3	Seventh place play-off
5	(Peru) Municipalidad San Borja	4	0	0	4	4	16	−12	0	Ninth place play-off

Source: CONMEBOL
(H) Hosts
15 July 2017
14:00

Trujillanos (Venezuela)	3–0	(Peru) Municipalidad San Borja
	Report

Polideportivo del Comité Olímpico Paraguayo, Luque
15 July 2017
18:30

Sport Colonial (Paraguay)	5–1	(Ecuador) Cumanda Agua Lluvia
	Report

Polideportivo del Comité Olímpico Paraguayo, Luque

16 July 2017
14:00

Trujillanos (Venezuela)	3–1	(Uruguay) Río Negro City
	Report

Polideportivo del Comité Olímpico Paraguayo, Luque
16 July 2017
18:00

Sport Colonial (Paraguay)	4–1	(Peru) Municipalidad San Borja
	Report

Polideportivo del Comité Olímpico Paraguayo, Luque

17 July 2017
14:00

Río Negro City (Uruguay)	5–1	(Peru) Municipalidad San Borja
	Report

Polideportivo del Comité Olímpico Paraguayo, Luque
17 July 2017
18:00

Trujillanos (Venezuela)	6–4	(Ecuador) Cumanda Agua Lluvia
	Report

Polideportivo del Comité Olímpico Paraguayo, Luque

18 July 2017
14:00

Municipalidad San Borja (Peru)	2–4	(Ecuador) Cumanda Agua Lluvia
	Report

Polideportivo del Comité Olímpico Paraguayo, Luque
18 July 2017
20:00

Sport Colonial (Paraguay)	3–1	(Uruguay) Río Negro City
	Report

Polideportivo del Comité Olímpico Paraguayo, Luque

19 July 2017
16:00

Río Negro City (Uruguay)	3–2	(Ecuador) Cumanda Agua Lluvia
	Report

Polideportivo del Comité Olímpico Paraguayo, Luque
19 July 2017
20:00

Sport Colonial (Paraguay)	2–2	(Venezuela) Trujillanos
	Report

Polideportivo del Comité Olímpico Paraguayo, Luque

=== Group B ===
Pos	Team	Pld	W	D	L	GF	GA	GD	Pts	Qualification
1	(Brazil) Unochapecó	4	4	0	0	25	3	+22	12	Knockout stage
2	(Chile) Palestino	4	2	1	1	13	16	−3	7	Knockout stage
3	(Argentina) San Lorenzo	4	2	0	2	12	12	0	6	Fifth place play-off
4	(Colombia) Real Antioquia	4	0	2	2	6	11	−5	2	Seventh place play-off
5	(Bolivia) Atlantes	4	0	1	3	7	21	−14	1	Ninth place play-off

Source: CONMEBOL
15 July 2017
16:00

Unochapecó (Brazil)	8–0	(Bolivia) Atlantes
	Report

Polideportivo del Comité Olímpico Paraguayo, Luque
15 July 2017
20:30

San Lorenzo (Argentina)	1–3	(Chile) Palestino
	Report

Polideportivo del Comité Olímpico Paraguayo, Luque

16 July 2017
16:00

Unochapecó (Brazil)	10–2	(Chile) Palestino
	Report

Polideportivo del Comité Olímpico Paraguayo, Luque
16 July 2017
20:00

San Lorenzo (Argentina)	4–3	(Colombia) Real Antioquia
	Report

Polideportivo del Comité Olímpico Paraguayo, Luque

17 July 2017
16:00

San Lorenzo (Argentina)	6–3	(Bolivia) Atlantes
	Report

Polideportivo del Comité Olímpico Paraguayo, Luque
17 July 2017
20:00

Real Antioquia (Colombia)	2–2	(Chile) Palestino
	Report

Polideportivo del Comité Olímpico Paraguayo, Luque

18 July 2017
16:00

Palestino (Chile)	6–3	(Bolivia) Atlantes
	Report

Polideportivo del Comité Olímpico Paraguayo, Luque
18 July 2017
18:00

Unochapecó (Brazil)	4–0	(Colombia) Real Antioquia
	Report

Polideportivo del Comité Olímpico Paraguayo, Luque

19 July 2017
14:00

Real Antioquia (Colombia)	1–1	(Bolivia) Atlantes
	Report

Polideportivo del Comité Olímpico Paraguayo, Luque
19 July 2017
18:00

Unochapecó (Brazil)	3–1	(Argentina) San Lorenzo
	Report

Polideportivo del Comité Olímpico Paraguayo, Luque

== Knockout stage ==
In the semi-finals and final, extra time and penalty shoot-out are used to decide the winner if necessary. In the classification matches, penalty shoot-out (no extra time) were used to decide the winner if necessary.

=== Bracket ===
Semi-finals
21 July
(Brazil) Unochapecó	6
(Venezuela) Trujillanos	1
21 July
(Paraguay) Sport Colonial	7
(Chile) Palestino	2

Final
22 July
(Brazil) Unochapecó	4
(Paraguay) Sport Colonial	2
Third place
22 July
(Venezuela) Trujillanos	4
(Chile) Palestino	0

Fifth place
21 July
(Uruguay) Río Negro City	3
(Argentina) San Lorenzo	6

Seventh place
21 July
(Ecuador) Cumanda Agua Lluvia	2
(Colombia) Real Antioquia	4

Ninth place
21 July
(Peru) Municipalidad San Borja	1
(Bolivia) Atlantes	3

=== Ninth place play-off ===
21 July 2017
12:00

Municipalidad San Borja (Peru)	1–3	(Bolivia) Atlantes
	Report

Polideportivo del Comité Olímpico Paraguayo, Luque

=== Seventh place play-off ===
21 July 2017
14:00

Cumanda Agua Lluvia (Ecuador)	2–4	(Colombia) Real Antioquia
	Report

Polideportivo del Comité Olímpico Paraguayo, Luque

=== Fifth place play-off ===
21 July 2017
16:00

Río Negro City (Uruguay)	3–6	(Argentina) San Lorenzo
	Report

Polideportivo del Comité Olímpico Paraguayo, Luque

=== Semi-finals ===
21 July 2017
18:00

Unochapecó (Brazil)	6–1	(Venezuela) Trujillanos
	Report

Polideportivo del Comité Olímpico Paraguayo, Luque
21 July 2017
20:00

Sport Colonial (Paraguay)	7–2	(Chile) Palestino
	Report

Polideportivo del Comité Olímpico Paraguayo, Luque

=== Third place play-off ===
22 July 2017
16:00

Trujillanos (Venezuela)	4–0	(Chile) Palestino
	Report

Polideportivo del Comité Olímpico Paraguayo, Luque

=== Final ===
22 July 2017
18:00

Unochapecó (Brazil)	4–2	(Paraguay) Sport Colonial
	Report

Polideportivo del Comité Olímpico Paraguayo, Luque

== Final ranking ==
Rank	Team
1st place, gold medalist(s)	(Brazil) Unochapecó
2nd place, silver medalist(s)	(Paraguay) Sport Colonial
3rd place, bronze medalist(s)	(Venezuela) Trujillanos
4	(Chile) Palestino
5	(Argentina) San Lorenzo
6	(Uruguay) Río Negro City
7	(Colombia) Bello Real Antioquia
8	(Ecuador) Cumanda Agua Lluvia
9	(Bolivia) Atlantes
10	(Peru) Municipalidad San Borja
