= Copa Libertadores Futsal Femenina =

CONMEBOL Libertadores de Futsal Femenina
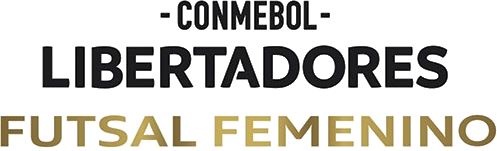
- Organizer(s): CONMEBOL
- Founded: 2013; 13 years ago
- Region: South America
- Teams: 10 (from 10 associations)
- Related competitions: Copa Libertadores
- Current champion(s): (Brazil) Taboão Magnus (2nd title)
- Most championships: (Brazil) Barateiro (Brazil) Stein Cascavel (Brazil) Taboão Magnus (Brazil) Uno/Chapecó (2 titles)
- Website: conmebol.com/libfutfemenina
- 2025 Copa Libertadores de Futsal Femenina

The CONMEBOL Libertadores Futsal Femenina is a women's club futsal tournament organized by CONMEBOL for South American nations.

== Results ==
Ed.	Year	Host	First place match		
Ed.	Year	Host	(gold) Champions	Score	(silver) Runners-up
1	2013	Chile	(Brazil) Uno/Chapecó	5–1	(Argentina) San Lorenzo
–	2014	No tournament			
2	2015	Chile	(Brazil) Barateiro	11–0	(Chile) Santiago Morning
3	2016	Chile	(Brazil) Barateiro	7–2	(Venezuela) Estudiantes de Guárico
4	2017	Paraguay	(Brazil) Uno/Chapecó	4–2	(Paraguay) Sport Colonial
5	2018	Paraguay	(Brazil) Leoas da Serra	4–0	(Paraguay) Sport Colonial
6	2019	Brazil	(Brazil) Cianorte	2–0	(Colombia) Independiente
–	2020	Bolivia	Canceled due to the COVID-19 pandemic (originally scheduled 23–30 May)		
–	2021	Bolivia	Canceled due to the COVID-19 pandemic (originally scheduled 5–12 September)		
7	2022	Bolivia	(Brazil) Taboão Magnus	6–0	(Argentina) San Lorenzo
8	2023	Paraguay	(Brazil) Stein Cascavel	5–0	(Bolivia) Always Ready
9	2024	Bolivia	(Brazil) Stein Cascavel	5–0	(Argentina) Racing
10	2025	Paraguay	(Brazil) Taboão Magnus	3–2	(Argentina) All Boys

== Performances ==
=== By club ===
Team	Won	Runner-up	Years won	Years runner-up
(Brazil) Barateiro	2	0	2015, 2016	—
(Brazil) Stein Cascavel	2	0	2023, 2024	—
(Brazil) Taboão Magnus	2	0	2022, 2025	—
(Brazil) Uno/Chapecó	2	0	2013, 2017	—
(Brazil) Cianorte	1	0	2019	—
(Brazil) Leoas da Serra	1	0	2018	—
(Argentina) San Lorenzo	0	2	—	2013, 2022
(Paraguay) Sport Colonial	0	2	—	2017, 2018
(Argentina) All Boys	0	1	—	2025
(Bolivia) Always Ready	0	1	—	2023
(Venezuela) Estudiantes de Guárico	0	1	—	2016
(Colombia) Independiente	0	1	—	2019
(Argentina) Racing	0	1	—	2024
(Chile) Santiago Morning	0	1	—	2015

=== Performance by nation ===
Team	Titles	Runner-up
Brazil	10 (2013, 2015, 2016, 2017, 2018, 2019, 2022, 2023, 2024, 2025)	0
Argentina	0	4 (2013, 2022, 2024, 2025)
Paraguay	0	2 (2017, 2018)
Chile	0	1 (2015)
Venezuela	0	1 (2016)
Colombia	0	1 (2019)
Bolivia	0	1 (2023)
