= Paraguayan futsal league system =

Futsal in Paraguay is made up of a pyramidal system of interconnected leagues (divisions), whose highest category is the Liga Premium. All categories are organized by the Futsal Division of the Paraguayan Football Association.

At the end of each season, and depending on the results obtained, the participating teams can be promoted or relegated from its division.

== Divisions ==
Tier	Divisions
1st	Liga Premium; 12 teams
2nd	Categoría Honor; 10 teams
3rd	Categoría Primera; 9 teams

== Participating clubs (2024) ==
=== Liga Premium ===
- AFEMEC
- Campo Alto
- Cerro Porteño
- Exa Ysaty
- Humaitá
- Olimpia
- Presidente Hayes
- San Cristóbal
- Sport Colonial
- Star’s Club
- Villa Hayes

=== Categoría Honor ===
- 3 de Mayo
- Ameliano
- Coronel Escurra
- Filosofía
- Gaspar R. de Francia
- Recoleta
- San Gerónimo
- Santaní
- Teniente Rojas Silva
- Villa Virginia

=== Categoría Primera ===
- Atlántida
- Deportivo Sajonia
- Fernando de la Mora
- Fomento de Fátima
- Fulgencio Yegros
- General Genes
- Jovenes Unidos
- Oriental
- Universidad Americana
