= Teófilo Barrios =

Paraguayan footballer (born 1964)

Personal information
- Full name: Teófilo Barrios
- Date of birth: 23 July 1964 (age 62)
- Place of birth: Caaguazú, Paraguay
- Height: 1.85 m (6 ft 1 in)
- Position: Full-back

International career
Years	Team	Apps	(Gls)
1991–1993	Paraguay	11	(0)

Teófilo Barrios (born 23 July 1964) is a retired football defender from Paraguay. A right or left back, he played professional football for Cerro Porteño in Paraguay and Talleres de Córdoba in Argentina.

== International ==
Barrios made his international debut for the Paraguay national football team on 27 February 1991 in a friendly match against Brazil (1-1). He obtained a total number of 11 international caps, scoring no goals for the national side. Barrios represented his native country at two Copa América's: 1991 and 1993.
