= División de Honor de Fútbol Sala =

- Organising body: Peruvian Football Federation
- Founded: 1999
- Region: Peru
- Level on pyramid: 1
- Relegation to: División Superior
- International cup: Copa Libertadores de Futsal
- Current champions: Panta Walon (9th title)
- Most championships: Panta Walon (9 titles)

The División de Honor, also known as Liga Futsal Pro, is the top Peruvian futsal league organized by the Peruvian Football Federation.

== History ==
Futsal was created in Uruguay around 1930 by Juan Carlos Ceriani a professor of physical education of the Montevideo's Young Men's Christian Association (YMCA). Later, the sport was introduced in Peru, around 1960, by Lima's YMCA.

During the 1970s Dante Vargas and the Instituto Nacional de Recreación (National Recreation Institute) tried to promote the sport, but they failed because of the popularity of street football. Years later, the Peruvian Football Federation, helped by some Regatas Lima club members, tried to develop a program to promote futsal, but it failed again.

Finally, in 1999, the Peruvian Football Federation and its National Futsal Commission achieved a consolidation of the sport. At first, the league was named División Superior (Higher Division) and later, in 2010, it changed to its currently name. Also, it had little media coverage until 2009, when CMD started to retransmit the matches.

In 2004, Deportivo Kansas (runner-up in the 2003 season) won the Copa Merconorte and qualified to the final of the Copa Libertadores de Futsal (South American Club Futsal Championship). Kansas lost the final against Malwee/Jaraguá, however that remains the most successful international participation for a Peruvian futsal club.

Since 2010, Panta Walon and Primero de Mayo have dominated the league; both teams played in all the finals from the 2010 to the 2018 season. During this period, Panta won six titles and 1.° de Mayo two. This match is called the Clásico del fútbol sala peruano (Peruvian futsal derby).

== Men's Competition ==
=== List of champions ===
Ed.	Season	Champion	Runner-up
Torneo Experimental
1	1999	Deporcentro Casuarinas	
2	2000	Deporcentro Casuarinas	
3	2001	Deporcentro Casuarinas	
División Superior
4	2002	Juventud Almagro	Deportivo Ingeniería
5	2003	Deportivo La Sonora	Kansas
6	2004	Kansas	Deportivo La Sonora
7	2005	Universitario	Deportivo JAP
8	2006	Kansas	Universitario
9	2007	Universidad San Martín	Deportivo América
10	2008	Deportivo Ingeniería	Deportivo JAP
11	2009	Grasshoppers	Deportivo JAP
División de Honor
12	2010	Panta NPA	TigreGraph
13	2011	Panta NPA/Sport Boys	AFA Rímac
14	2012	Primero de Mayo	Panta NPA UCV
15	2013	Panta Walon	Primero de Mayo
16	2014	Panta Walon	R&R Surco
17	2015	Primero de Mayo	Panta Walon
18	2016	Primero de Mayo	Panta Walon
Futsal Pro: Primera División
19	2017	Panta Walon	Primero de Mayo
20	2018	Panta Walon	Primero de Mayo
21	2019	Universitario	Deportivo Overall
–	2020	Canceled due to the COVID-19 pandemic	
–	2021	Canceled due to the COVID-19 pandemic	
22	2022	Panta Walon	Universitario
23	2023	Panta Walon	Universitario
24	2024	Universitario	Panta Walon
25	2025	Panta Walon	Universitario

=== Titles by club ===
Rank	Club	Winners	Winning years
1	Panta Walon	9	2010, 2011, 2013, 2014, 2017, 2018, 2022, 2023, 2025
2	Primero de Mayo	3	2012, 2015, 2016
2	Universitario	3	2005, 2019, 2024
2	Deporcentro Casuarinas	3	1999, 2000, 2001
3	Kansas	2	2004, 2006
4	Universidad San Martín	1	2007
4	Deportivo La Sonora	1	2003
4	Deportivo Ingeniería	1	2008
4	Grasshoppers	1	2009
4	Juventud Almagro	1	2002

== Women's Competition ==
División de Honor de Fútbol Sala
- Organising body: Peruvian Football Federation
- Founded: 2014
- Region: Peru
- Level on pyramid: 1
- International cup: Copa Libertadores Futsal Femenina
- Current champions: Deportivo JAP (2nd title)
- Most championships: Municipalidad de San Borja (3 titles)

=== List of champions ===
Ed.	Season	Champion	Runner-up
División de Honor
1	2014	Municipalidad de San Borja	
2	2015	Municipalidad de San Borja	
3	2016	Municipalidad de San Borja	
Futsal Pro: Primera División
4	2017	Universidad San Marcos	
5	2018	Universidad San Marcos	Municipalidad de San Borja
6	2019	Marte - Primero de Mayo	Universidad San Marcos
–	2020	Canceled due to the COVID-19 pandemic	
–	2021	Canceled due to the COVID-19 pandemic	
7	2022	Marte Rebaza	Deportivo JAP
8	2023	Deportivo JAP	Marte Rebaza
9	2024	Deportivo JAP	Mecatrónica
10	2025	Mecatrónica	Deportivo Partizán

=== Titles by club ===
Rank	Club	Winners	Winning years
1	Municipalidad de San Borja	3	2014, 2015, 2016
2	Deportivo JAP	2	2023, 2024
2	Marte Rebaza	2	2019, 2022
2	Universidad San Marcos	2	2017, 2018

== See also ==
- Peru national futsal team
