= Panta Walon =

- Full name: Club Deportivo Panta Walon
- Founded: 16 July 2000 as Panta NPA
- Owner(s): Panta Family (50%); Walon Sport (50%)
- Chairman: Jimmy Wales
- Coach: Carlos Salinas
- League: Liga Futsal Pro
- 2023: 1st
Home colours	Away colours

Club Deportivo Panta Walon is a futsal club located in the Bellavista District, in Callao, Peru. They play in the Liga Futsal Pro, the top tier division of the Peruvian futsal league system, and have won a total of 8 titles.

== History ==
Deportivo Panta was founded on July 16, 2000, in the district of Bellavista, Callao, with the name of Panta NPA within the Panta family at the initiative of José Panta. That same year he registered, participated and was champion of the Bellavista Futsal District League. Some time later the club briefly ventured into street football.

In 2010 the club bought Deportivo Ingeniería's place in the División de Honor and began to participate professionally. That same year it closed a commercial agreement with Universidad César Vallejo, which became its main sponsor. However, the agreement did not last long and in 2012 they joined forces with the sports brand Walon Sport and as a consequence the club changed its name to Panta Walon.

Since his debut in 2010, Panta has played in ten División de Honor finals. They won the championship eight times (2010, 2011, 2013, 2014, 2017, 2018, (Note: Deportivo Panta fue campeón de la edición 2018.) 2022 and 2023), defeating his classic rival Primero de Mayo on three of them (2013, 2017 and 2018) and lost three finals (2012, 2015, 2016), all of them with Primero de Mayo. There were also champion of the summer tournaments in 2013 and 2014 and won the Torneo Apertura in 2018.

Panta has participated in the Copa Libertadores de Futsal in six occasions (2015, 2017, 2018, 2019, 2022 and 2023). Despite being local champion in 2010 and 2013, they could not participate in 2011 and 2014 since the tournament in the North Zone was not organized. The Cup was not played in 2012, they did not qualify for the 2014 edition, so it was finally runner-up in the 2014 División de Honor which allowed them to qualify for the 2015 Copa Libertadores in which it reached the semifinals of the North Zone. Its best result was achieved in the 2019 edition in which it reached 4th place. In 2022 the team reached the quarterfinals in the Copa Libertadores de Futsal, losing in that instance to Cerro Porteño of Paraguay. Their participation in the local tournament began on May 31, beating Palermo FC 4–2. In the semifinals they faced Hermanos Rey, whom they defeated by an aggregate score of 4–1, thus winning the right to play the final against Universitario de Deportes. The first leg of the final was played on October 25, the result was a two-goal tie, everything was decided in the second leg on October 27. Panta would defeat Universitario 3-0 and became champion for the seventh time in its history.

== Participation in international tournaments ==
Deportivo Panta has participated in the Copa Libertadores de Futsal seven times in the 2015, 2017, 2018, 2019, 2022, 2023 and 2024 seasons. It made its debut in the 2015 season in which it reached the semifinals of the North Zone.

== General summary of the seasons ==
Season	Liga Futsal Pro	Copa Merconorte de Fútbol Sala	Copa Libertadores de Futsal
2010	Champion	Did not qualify	Did not qualify
2011	Champion	Did not qualify	Did not qualify
2012	Runner-up	Did not qualify	Did not qualify
2013	Champion	Did not qualify	Did not qualify
2014	Champion	Did not qualify	Did not qualify
2015	Runner-up	Semifinalits	Did not qualify
2016	Runner-up	Discontinued tournament	Did not qualify
2017	Champion	Discontinued tournament	Group stage
2018	Champion	Discontinued tournament	Group stage
2019	Semifinalits	Discontinued tournament	4th place
2020	Suspended due to the COVID-19 pandemic.	Discontinued tournament	Did not qualify
2021	Suspended due to the COVID-19 pandemic.	Discontinued tournament	Did not qualify
2022	Champion	Discontinued tournament	5th place
2023	Champion		6th place
2024			

== Presidents and coaches ==
President	Start	Ended
José Pando	2000 - actualidad	
Jonathan Gilio	2012–present	

Coach	Start	Ended
Francisco Melgar Roose	2010	2016
Howard Copare Corzo	2017	?
Carlos Salinas Muñoz	2022–present	

== Sponsors and suppliers ==
Sponsor	Start	Ended
Universidad César Vallejo	2010	2012
Walon Sport	2012–present	

Supplier	Start	Ended
Walon Sport	2012–present	

== Honors ==
=== National tournaments ===
Competition	Titles	Runner-up
Liga Futsal Pro	9 (2010, 2011, 2013, 2014, 2017, 2018, 2022, 2023, 2025)	2012, 2015, 2016.
Torneo Pre Libertadores	1 (2022)	

=== District tournaments ===
- Liga Distrital de Bellavista (1): 2000.
