= Liga Premium de Futsal =

- Organising body: APF
- Founded: 2015; 11 years ago
- Country: Paraguay
- Confederation: CONMEBOL
- Number of clubs: 12
- Level on pyramid: Level 1
- Relegation to: Categoría Honor
- International cup: Copa Libertadores de Futsal
- Current champions: Cerro Porteño (10th title) (2025)
- Most championships: Cerro Porteño (10 titles)
- Broadcaster(s): Tigo Sports
- Website: www.apf.org.py

The Liga Premium de Futsal is the premier professional futsal clubs league in Paraguay. It started in 2015, is organized by the Paraguayan Football Association (APF), the country's governing body of football, and currently consists of 12 teams.
The champions qualify for the following year's Copa Libertadores de Futsal.

== Teams ==
The following 12 teams are competing in the league for the 2026 season:

Club	Hometown
3 de Mayo	(Central Department) Fernando de la Mora
AFEMEC	Asunción
Cerro Porteño	Asunción
Coronel Escurra	Asunción
Deportivo Santaní	San Estanislao
Exa Ysaty	Asunción
Olimpia	Asunción
Presidente Hayes	Asunción
Recoleta	Asunción
San Cristóbal	Asunción
Sol Campo Alto	Asunción
Star’s Club	Asunción

== Champions ==
Liga Premium de Futsal
Edition	Year	Champion	Runner-up
I	2015	Cerro Porteño	AFEMEC
II	2016	Cerro Porteño	AFEMEC
III	2017	Cerro Porteño	Sport Colonial
IV	2018	Cerro Porteño	Sport Colonial
V	2019	Cerro Porteño	Olimpia
	2020	No championship due to the COVID-19 pandemic.	
VI	2021	Cerro Porteño	Sport Colonial
VII	2022	Cerro Porteño	Olimpia
VIII	2023	Cerro Porteño	Olimpia
IX	2024	Cerro Porteño	AFEMEC
X	2025	Cerro Porteño	AFEMEC

=== Performance by club ===
Club	Champion	Runner-up	Champion years	Runner-up years
Cerro Porteño	10	0	2015, 2016, 2017, 2018, 2019, 2021, 2022, 2023, 2024, 2025	
AFEMEC	0	4		2015, 2016, 2024, 2025
Sport Colonial	0	3		2017, 2018, 2021
Olimpia	0	3		2019, 2022, 2023

== See also ==
- Paraguayan futsal league system
