= Carlos Barbosa =

Municipality of Rio Grande do Sul, Brazil

- Municipality

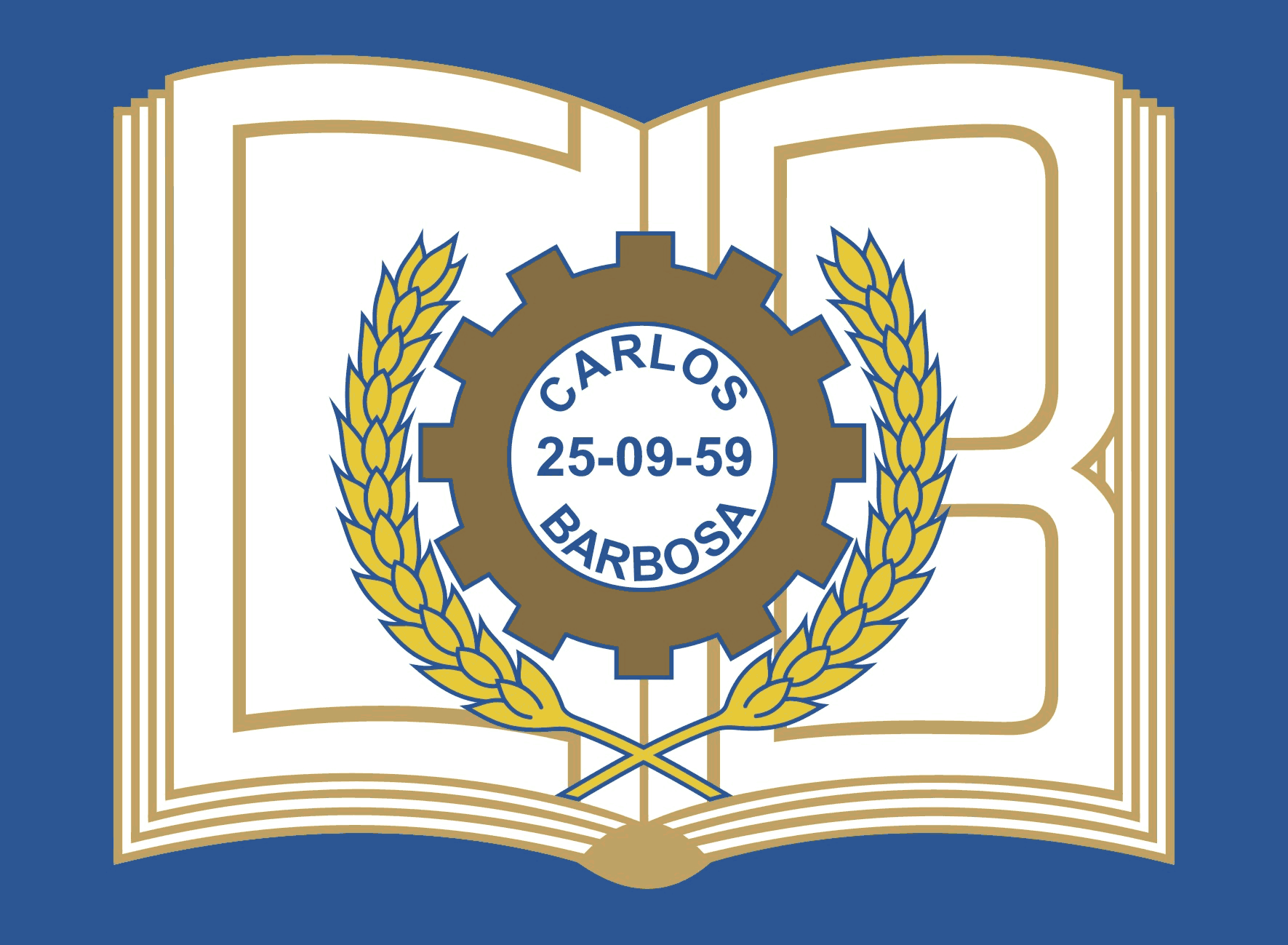
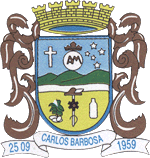
- Flag Coat of arms

- Location within Rio Grande do Sul

- Location in Brazil
- Coordinates: 29°18′S 51°30′W
- Country: Brazil
- State: Rio Grande do Sul

Population (2020)
  - Total: 30,241
- Time zone: UTC−3 (BRT)
- Postal code: 95185-000
- Area/distance code: 51
- Website: carlosbarbosa.rs.gov.br

Carlos Barbosa is a town in the wine country in Rio Grande do Sul state, Brazil. It is situated at 29º17'51" South and 51º30'13" West, at an altitude of 676 meters. Its population was estimated in 2020 to be 30,241 inhabitants. It has an area of 208,16 km sq.

The city is linked by railroad line to Bento Gonçalves and the Maria Fumaça tourist train runs between both cities.

The town is named after governor Carlos Barbosa Gonçalves.

== Economy ==
Metallurgy company Tramontina and dairy company Cooperativa Santa Clara are based in Carlos Barbosa.

== Sports ==
The Associação Carlos Barbosa de Futsal is one of the major futsal clubs in South America. Thanks to this, the town have hosted South America's premier club futsal tournament, the Copa Libertadores de Futsal, four times.

The Maria Fumaça steam locomotive at the Bento Gonçalves train station - the train runs between Bento Gonçalves and Carlos Barbosa with a stop in Garibaldi

== See also ==
- List of municipalities in Rio Grande do Sul
