= Club Presidente Hayes =

Paraguayan football club

Presidente Hayes
- Full name: Club Presidente Hayes
- Nickname: Los Yanquis (The yankees)
- Founded: November 8, 1907; 119 years ago
- Ground: Estadio Cnel. Félix Cabrera, Tacumbú, Paraguay
- Capacity: 5,000
- League: Primera División C
Home colours	Away colours

Club Presidente Hayes is a Paraguayan association football club from Tacumbú, a section of Asunción, Paraguay. The club is also known colloquially by its nicknames The Yankees (Los Yanquis) and The Little Star (La Estrellita). They play regularly in Asuncion's Kiko Reyes Stadium (Estadio Kiko Reyes) as part of the Paraguayan Soccer League (Asociacion Paraguaya de Futbol). The club was founded in 1907 and participated in their first international tournament in the 1953 Copa Montevideo. It is one of several entities in Paraguay that were named in honor of Rutherford B. Hayes, the 19th President of the United States. Hayes, who was required to arbitrate an Argentine-Paraguayan territorial dispute in the Gran Chaco after the War of the Triple Alliance, decided in favour of Paraguay. The club is the former home of Paraguayans Néstor Benítez, Teófilo Barrios, Tomás Guzmán, Julio Valentín González and José Ariel Núñez, and foreigners Riki Kitawaki, Bryan Lopez, and Victor Cristaldo

The club also competes in beach soccer in the Superliga APF de Fútbol Playa, being champions in the 2022 edition. They have also won the 2022 Copa Libertadores de Fútbol Playa, being the first non-Brazilian club to do so.

== History ==
In 1945, the club finished third in the 1945 Paraguayan Primera División season.

In 1952, the club won the 1952 Paraguayan Primera División season.

== Current squad ==
As of March 2021

Note: Flags indicate national team as defined under FIFA eligibility rules; some limited exceptions apply. Players may hold more than one non-FIFA nationality.

No.	Pos.	Nation	Player
—		PAR	Fabio Escobar
—		PAR	Jorge Paredes

== Notable players ==
To appear in this section a player must have either:

- Played at least 125 games for the club.
- Set a club record or won an individual award while at the club.
- Been part of a national team at any time.
- Played in the first division of any other football association (outside of Paraguay).
- Played in a continental and/or intercontinental competition.

1930s

- (Paraguay) Eustacio Chamorro

1950s

- (Paraguay) Néstor Benítez (1957–1962)

1990s

- (Paraguay) Edgar Denis (1991–1993)
- (Paraguay) Justo Jacquet (1994–1995)
- (Paraguay) Paulo da Silva (1996)
- (Paraguay) Teófilo Barrios (1997)
- (Paraguay) Tomás Guzmán (1998–2000)
- (Paraguay) Jorge Brítez (1999)

2000s

- (Paraguay) Inocencio Zárate (2002–presente)
- (Paraguay) Julio Valentín González (2008)
- (Paraguay) José Ariel Núñez (2008)

2010s

- (Colombia) Freddy Cabezas (2018)

Non-CONMEBOL players

- (Australia) Victor Cristaldo (1993–1996)
- (Japan) Riki Kitawaki (2007)
- (United States) Bryan Lopez (2013)

== Honours ==
=== Football ===
==== National ====
- Primera División
  - Winners (1): 1952
- División Intermedia
  - Winners (8): 1911, 1919, 1958, 1967, 1971, 1973, 1974, 1991
- Paraguayan Tercera División
  - Winners (1): 2006

=== Beach soccer ===
- Superliga APF de Fútbol Playa
  - Winners (1): 2022
- Copa Libertadores de Fútbol Playa
  - Winners (1): 2022

=== Futsal ===
- Categoría Honor
  - Winners (1): 2021
