= Obrero (Asunción) =

Obrero Barrio Obrero
- Barrio
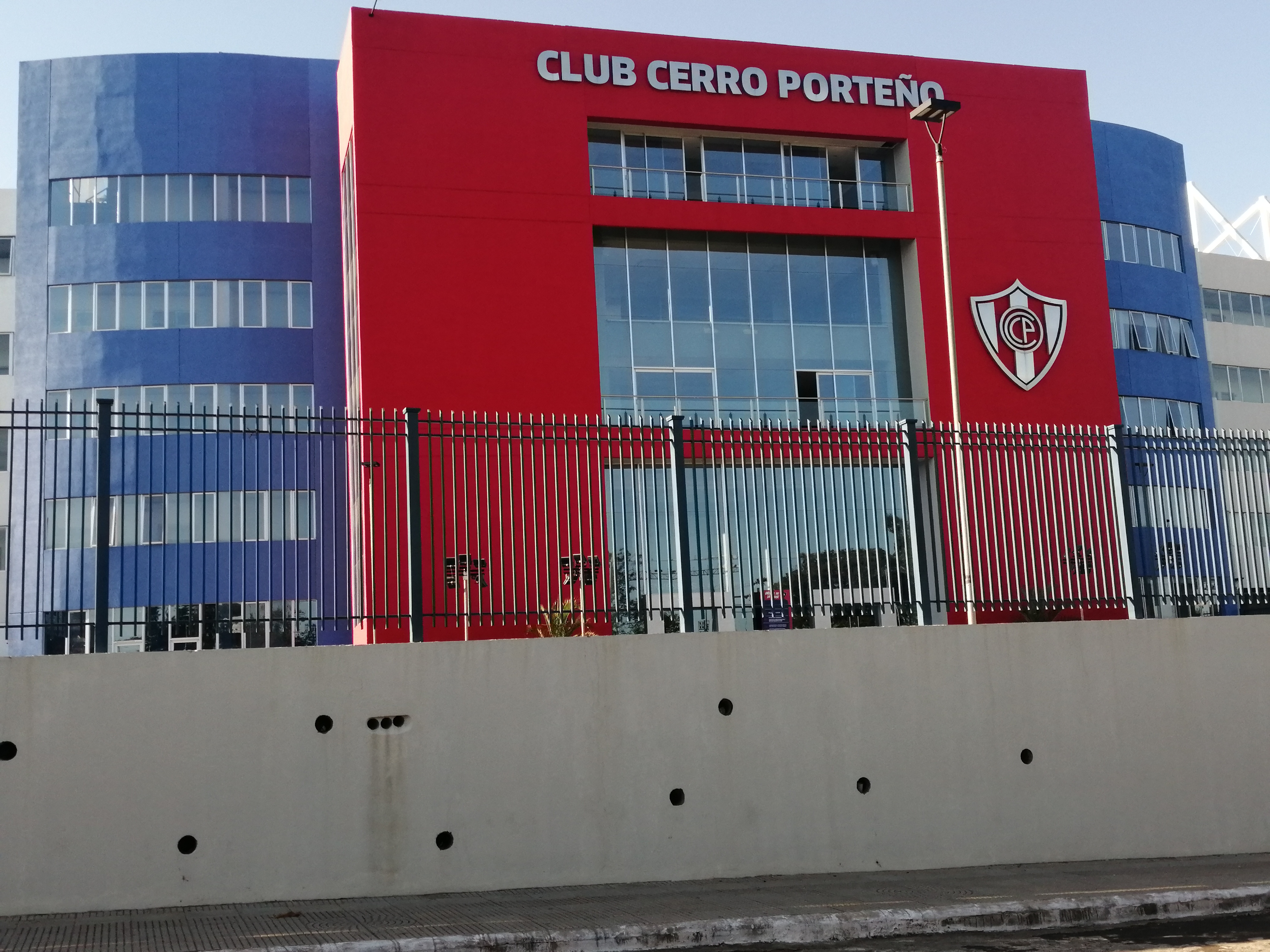
- Exterior view of the General Pablo Rojas Stadium in 2020
- Interactive map of Obrero
- Coordinates: 25°18′S 57°38′W
- Country: Paraguay
- Autonomous Capital District: Gran Asunción
- City: Asunción
- District: La Catedral

Area
  - Total: 2.40 km^{2} (0.93 sq mi)

Population (2002)
  - Total: 19,823
  - Density: 8,259/km^{2} (21,390/sq mi)

Obrero, also known as Barrio Obrero, is a neighbourhood (barrio) of Asunción, the capital and largest city of Paraguay. In 2002, the neighborhood recorded a population of 19,823 people. Its name stems from the word "worker" (obrero) in reference to the working class people who founded and today account for the majority of the population.

== Overview ==
Barrio Obrero is famous for its Quinta Avenida (the Fifth Avenue) where several small bars, restaurants, shops and casinos are located. The neighbourhood is also known as the home of several important and traditional football and sport clubs such as Cerro Porteño, Nacional, Sol de América and Club Atlántida.
