= Tacumbú prison =

Prison in Asunción, Paraguay

Coordinates: 25.3048°S 57.6563°W

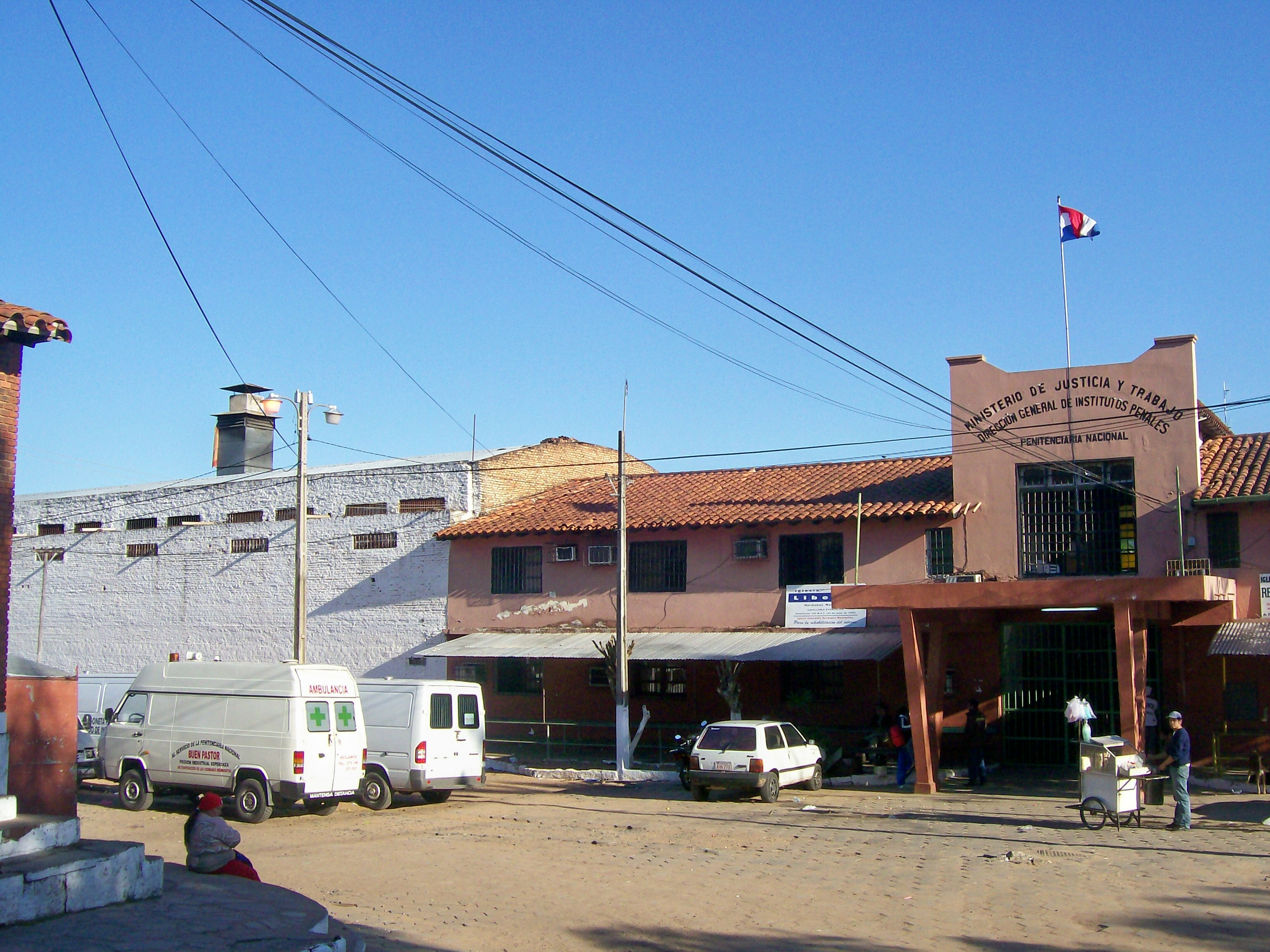
National Prison, Tacumbú (2007)

The Tacumbú National Penitentiary (Penitenciaria Nacional de Tacumbú), also known as the Penal de Tacumbú, Penitenciaría de Tacumbú o simply Tacumbú, was a penitentiary operated by the Ministry of Justice of Paraguay, located in the eponymous neighborhood of Asunción. It was the largest penal facility in the country and was considered one of the most dangerous prisons in the world. The facility housed over 4,000 inmates until its temporal closure in 2026. Tacumbú was reopened as a "Detention Center", and as of 2026 houses over 1000 inmates, all of whom have no official conviction.

== History ==
When it first opened in 1956, Tacumbú prison was designed to hold just 800 prisoners, however its capacity was soon increased to hold 1,500 inmates. By 2020, the facility housed 4,231 inmates, resulting in severe overcrowding that forced many prisoners to sleep on the ground in outdoor areas.

In an interview with a reporter from InSight Crime, Jorge Fernández, prison director in 2019, pointed out that only 40 to 43 guards are in charge of around 4,000 prisoners, while at least 100 would be required in order to keep the situation under control. He claimed that the number of guards on duty is not sufficient to stop the circulation of marijuana, cocaine, crack or weapons within Tacumbú. Fernández also stated that only about 25% of the inmates have been convicted, while 75% are still awaiting their trial.

Since visits were allowed four days a week (Tuesdays, Thursdays, Saturdays and Sundays), as many as 7,000 visitors from the outside may have been admitted simultaneously.

Gang violence include bloody clashes between the "Clan Rotela" and Primeiro Comando da Capital (PCC) were responsible for at least 12 confirmed victims during a massacre in 2019.

On 11 May 2026, the Paraguayan government began Operation "Umbral 3.0" which consisted on the transfer of over 450 inmates from Tacumbú to the Penitentiary "Martín Mendoza", located in Emboscada. Tacumbú was officially re-named as a "Detention Center".

The British journalist Raphael Rowe visited the prison for the first episode of the fourth season of the documentary series Inside the World's Toughest Prisons.
