= Nueva Asunción =

- City
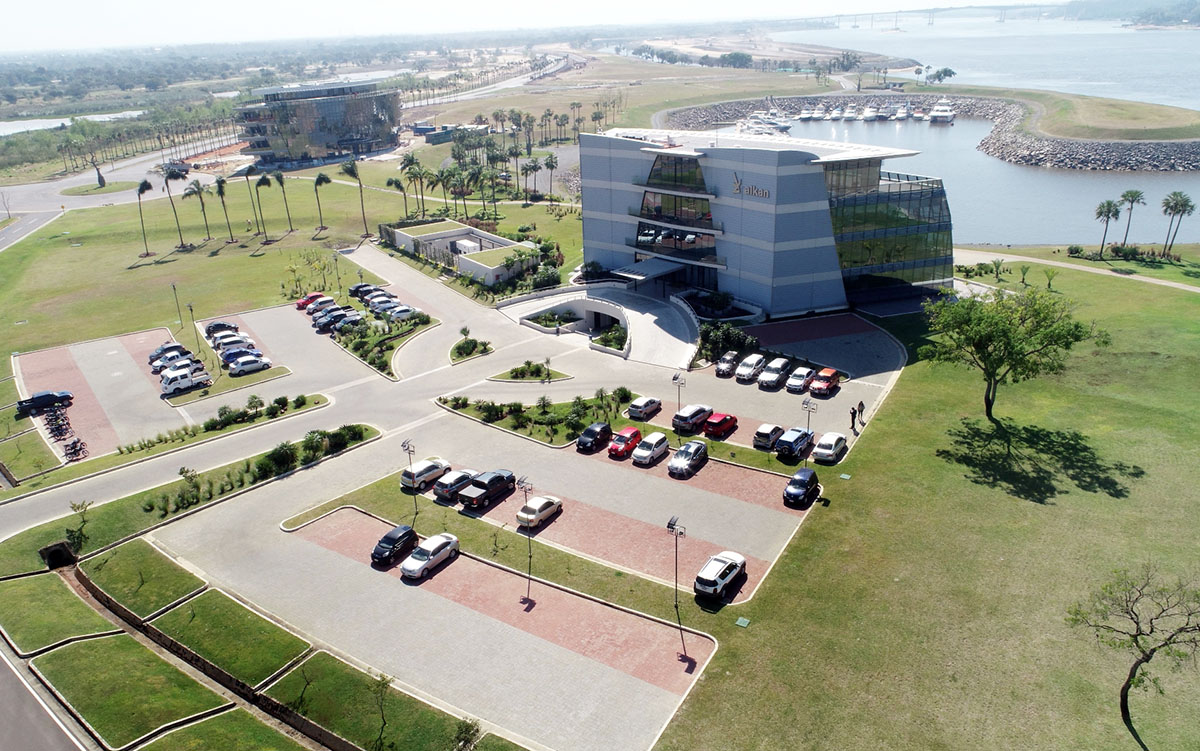

- Location in Paraguay
- Coordinates: 25°14′S 57°38′W
- Country: Paraguay
- Department: Presidente Hayes
- Founded: 22 April 2021; 5 years ago
- Named for: Assumption of Mary

Government
  - Intendant: Juan Miguel Vera (ANR)

Area
  - Total: 75.24 km^{2} (29.05 sq mi)
- Elevation: 43 m (141 ft)

Population
  - Estimate (2022): 5,000
- Demonym(s): Neoasunceno, -a
- Postal code: 1001–1925
- Area code: +595 (21)
- Climate: Cfa
- Website: Website (in Spanish)

Nueva Asunción (New Asunción) is a Paraguayan district located in the Presidente Hayes Department, on the western bank of the Paraguay River, about 5 km from Asunción.

Previously the area was known as Chaco'i, which means «little chaco» in Guaraní. In 2021, it was officially given the name Nueva Asunción, referring to the fact that it is the «new city» that represents the growth and expansion of Greater Asunción on the other side of the Paraguay River on the western region, a previously depopulated and underdeveloped area.
