= Rodrigo Burgos =

Paraguayan footballer (born 1989)

Personal information
- Full name: Rodrigo Roman Burgos Oviedo
- Date of birth: 21 June 1989 (age 37)
- Place of birth: Itacurubí de la Cordillera, Paraguay
- Height: 1.78 m (5 ft 10 in)
- Position: Defensive midfielder

Team information
- Current team: Boca Unidos

Youth career
- Cerro Porteño

Senior career*
Years	Team	Apps	(Gls)
2006–2012	Cerro Porteño	49	(1)
2012–2013	Sportivo Luqueño	8	(0)
2013–2014	Guabirá	36	(3)
2014	3 de Febrero	14	(0)
2015–2018	Talleres	48	(1)
2017–2018	→ Olimpia (loan)	19	(0)
2018–2019	Deportivo Capiatá	34	(1)
2019	Brown de Adrogué	13	(0)
2020	12 de Octubre	14	(0)
2021	Resistencia		
2022–	Boca Unidos	10	(0)

International career
2009	Paraguay U20	8	(0)
2009–	Paraguay	1	(0)
- * Club domestic league appearances and goals as of 16:00, 23 June 2022 (UTC)

Rodrigo Roman Burgos (born 21 July 1989) is a Paraguayan professional football who plays as a defensive midfielder for Boca Unidos in the Argentine Torneo Federal A.

At Talleres de Córdoba, Burgos first achieved ascension from Argentina's Torneo Federal A to the Primera B Nacional, and then to the Primera División Argentina. Burgos has amassed 17 Copa Libertadores appearances and 1 Copa Sudamericana appearance. He was runner-up with Paraguay at the 2009 South American Youth Championship.

== Club career ==
=== Cerro Porteño ===
==== 2006 ====
In 2006, Burgos first appeared in Cerro Porteño's first-team list.

==== 2007 ====
In 2007, Burgos formed part of Cerro Porteño's first-team, which included experienced players as 1998 FIFA World Cup Paraguay national team striker Cesar Ramirez and 2006 FIFA World Cup Paraguay national team defender Jorge Nuñez, among other players. In November 2007, Burgos played in his first superclasico for Cerro Porteño's first-team.

==== 2008 ====
Burgos remained in the first-team for the 2008 season, also with several other youth team graduates as Julio Santa Cruz, Celso Ortiz, Ivan Piris and Luis Caceres.

==== 2011 ====
In 2011, Burgos reached the Copa Libertadores semi-final for Cerro Porteño against Brazilian club Santos.

=== 3 de Febrero ===
2014 Primera División Paraguaya season, Burgos formed part of an experienced team at 3 de Febrero, with goalkeeper Antony Silva, Jorge Salinas, César Llamas and Brazilian player Diego Balbinot. He appeared in 14 league games for the season.

=== Talleres de Córdoba ===
==== 2015 ====
In 2015, Burgos signed with Argentine club Talleres de Córdoba, earning ascension from the Argentine third league to the country's second league. His teammates included Uruguayans Diego Martiñones, Julio Mozzo and Nicolás Schenone. Burgos made a total of 28 league appearances for Talleres in the 2015 Argentine third league season.

==== 2016 ====
During the 2016 Argentine Primera B Nacional season, Burgos noted 1 goal in 16 appearances. Burgos reached ascension to the Primera División Argentina for the succeeding season with Talleres, finishing the season in first position of the Primera B Nacional league table under Argentine coach Frank Kudelka. Burgos was one of Talleres de Córdoba's figures in its ascension to the Primera División, bringing the interest of Boca Juniors and Racing de Avellaneda.

==== 2016–17 ====
In the 2016–17 Primera División Argentina season, Burgos made four league appearances for Talleres. Burgos was accompanied by an experienced squad in the season, including goalkeeper Mauricio Caranta, Daniel Ludueña, Pablo Guiñazú, Gonzalo Klusener, Matías Vuoso, Chilean Carlos Munoz, and Nigerian player Okiki Afolabi.

==== 2017 season ====
In February 2017, Burgos joined Primera División Paraguaya team Olimpia Asunción on an 18-month loan with an option to buy, and Talleres extended its deal with Burgos until 2019, continuing to have a percentage of his economic rights. At Olimpia's first-team, Burgos joined players as Dario Veron, Roque Santa Cruz, Cristian Riveros, Nestor Ortigoza and goalkeeper Diego Barreto, all of whom represented Paraguay at the 2010 FIFA World Cup, and also Brian Montenegro and former Boca Juniors player Pablo Mouche. Burgos made 15 league appearances for Olimpia Asunción in the 2017 season.

==== 2018 season ====
In 2018, Burgos made 4 appearances for Olimpia Asunción. Burgos claimed the Torneo Apertura title with the team.

=== Brown de Adrogué ===
In June 2019, Burgos returned to Argentine football when he joined Primera B Nacional team Club Atlético Brown. Burgos made 19 appearances for Brown de Adrogué. In December 2019, Burgos was released from Brown de Arogué.

=== 12 de Octubre ===
In March 2020, Burgos was approached by Talleres' rivals, Belgrano de Córdoba, that he rejected out of respect to Talleres. In July 2020, D10 reported that Burgos wanted to return to Olimpia Asunción. In November 2020, Burgos spoke that he wished to play more and saw to depart 12 de Octubre and that Argentine club Boca Unidos could be an option for the remainder of the year.

=== Resistencia ===
On 5 January 2021, Diario HOY announced that Burgos had joined Resistencia in the División Intermedia, Paraguay's second-tier. With Burgos, in the team at Resistencia was Julian Benitez.

=== Boca Unidos ===
In January 2022, Burgos returned to Argentina, after signing with Torneo Federal A side Boca Unidos.

== International career ==
=== Under-20 national team ===
In 2007, he played for the Paraguay Under-20 team. In September 2009, and following a Hexagonal Tournament played in Venezuela and two friendly matches against the Uruguay U20 team, Burgos was selected in the final list for the Paraguay U20 team to play in the 2009 FIFA U-20 World Cup in Egypt. The team included players as Federico Santander, Lorenzo Melgarejo, Luis Fernando Paez, Hernan Perez, Celso Ortiz, Ronald Huth, Ivan Piris and Rolando Garcia.

=== Adult national team ===
He made his first full international appearance for Paraguay in 2009.

== Personal life ==
Whilst at Talleres de Córdoba in Argentina, Burgos studied and graduated to become a chef, wanting to give the pride to his mother, who worked as a cook.
