= 2010 APF División de Honor =

Primera División
- Season: 2010
- Champions: Apertura: Guaraní (10th title); Clausura: Libertad (15th title)
- Relegated: Sport Colombia; Trinidense
- Copa Libertadores: Libertad; Guaraní; Cerro Porteño
- Copa Sudamericana: Libertad; Nacional; Olimpia
- Matches: 264
- Goals: 667 (2.53 per match)
- Top goalscorer: Apertura: Rodrigo Teixeira; Pablo Zeballos (16 goals each); Clausura: Juan Carlos Ferreyra; Roberto Nanni (12 goals each)

The 2010 División Profesional season (officially the 2010 Copa TIGO-Visión Banco for sponsorship reasons) was the 76th season of top-flight professional football in Paraguay. It was the third season in which a champion was crowned for each tournament.

== Teams ==
Locations of the 2010 Primera División teams

Team	Home city	Stadium	Capacity
3 de Febrero	Ciudad del Este	Antonio Oddone Sarubbi	28,000
Cerro Porteño	Asunción	General Pablo Rojas	32,000
Guaraní	Asunción	Rogelio Livieres	6,000
Libertad	Asunción	Dr. Nicolás Leoz	10,000
Nacional	Asunción	Arsenio Erico	4,000
Olimpia	Asunción	Manuel Ferreira	15,000
Rubio Ñu	Asunción	La Arboleda	5,000
Sol de América	Villa Elisa	Luis Alfonso Giagni	5,000
Sport Colombia	Fernando de la Mora	Alfonso Colmán	7,000
Sportivo Luqueño	Luque	Feliciano Cáceres	25,000
Sportivo Trinidense	Asunción	Martín Torres	3,000
Tacuary	Asunción	Roberto Béttega	7,000

== Torneo Apertura ==
The Campeonato de Apertura, also the Torneo TIGO Apertura for sponsorship reasons, is the first championship of the season. It began on January 30 and ended on May 30.

=== Standings ===
Pos	Team	Pld	W	D	L	GF	GA	GD	Pts	Qualification or relegation
1	Guaraní	22	15	4	3	43	20	+23	49	2011 Copa Libertadores Second Stage
2	Cerro Porteño	22	14	3	5	37	23	+14	45	
3	Olimpia	22	11	6	5	32	18	+14	39	
4	Libertad	22	11	5	6	33	15	+18	38	
5	Rubio Ñu	22	10	8	4	36	25	+11	38	
6	Nacional	22	10	5	7	31	22	+9	35	
7	Sportivo Luqueño	22	5	10	7	26	30	−4	25	
8	Sol de América	22	7	4	11	27	39	−12	25	
9	Sportivo Trinidense	22	4	7	11	19	34	−15	19	
10	3 de Febrero	22	5	4	13	17	32	−15	19	
11	Sport Colombia	22	4	5	13	21	40	−19	17	
12	Tacuary	22	3	5	14	20	44	−24	14	

Source: RSSSF
Rules for classification: 1st points. If two teams are tied on points, a playoff game will be held to break the tie. If more than two clubs are tied on points, the following will be used as a tiebreaker: 1st goal difference; 2nd goals scored; 3rd away-goals scored; 4th draw of lots

Copa TIGO
2010 Apertura champion
Guaraní
10th title

=== Results ===
Home \ Away	3FE	CEP	GUA	LIB	NAC	OLI	RÑU	SOL	SPC	SPL	TAC	TRI
3 de Febrero		0–1	1–2	0–0	0–3	0–1	2–3	0–2	2–0	0–0	1–0	1–3
Cerro Porteño	2–1		1–3	0–2	3–0	0–0	1–1	1–0	4–1	1–0	1–0	4–1
Guaraní	1–1	1–2		1–0	2–2	2–1	3–2	3–1	1–0	2–0	5–2	2–0
Libertad	3–0	3–0	2–1		0–0	0–0	2–1	3–4	3–0	0–1	0–0	0–1
Nacional	2–1	0–3	1–0	1–0		0–0	0–0	1–2	1–2	3–0	4–0	2–0
Olimpia	1–0	3–2	0–0	0–2	1–0		1–1	1–2	2–1	2–1	3–2	3–1
Rubio Ñu	0–2	0–3	1–1	2–1	4–1	1–0		5–0	2–1	0–0	3–1	1–1
Sol de América	3–1	1–2	0–1	1–4	2–5	2–1	0–1		1–2	1–1	1–0	1–1
Sport Colombia	2–3	1–1	1–3	0–1	1–0	0–4	2–4	2–2		0–1	0–0	0–0
Sportivo Luqueño	0–0	3–1	1–2	1–2	1–1	1–1	2–2	1–0	2–3		3–3	3–3
Tacuary	3–0	1–2	1–4	0–4	0–3	0–4	0–1	1–1	2–2	1–2		2–0
Sportivo Trinidense	0–1	1–2	0–3	1–1	0–1	0–3	1–1	2–0	1–0	2–2	0–1	

Source: APF (in Spanish)
Legend: Blue = home team win; Yellow = draw; Red = away team win.

=== Top goalscorers ===
Pos	Player	Nationality	Club	Goals
1	Rodrigo Teixeira	Brazilian	Guaraní	16
1	Pablo Zeballos	Paraguayan	Cerro Porteño	16
3	Guillermo Beltrán	Paraguayan	Nacional	8
3	Nelson Cuevas	Paraguayan	Olimpia	8
5	Roberto Acuña	Paraguayan	Rubio Ñú	7
5	Miguel Cuéllar	Paraguayan	3 de Febrero	7
5	Francisco Esteche	Paraguayan	Sportivo Luqueño	7
5	Jonathan Fabbro	Paraguayan	Guaraní	7
5	Roberto Gamarra	Paraguayan	Libertad	7
10	Diego Alfonso	Paraguayan	Tacuary	6
10	Julio dos Santos	Paraguayan	Cerro Porteño	6

== Torneo Clausura ==
The Campeonato de Clausura, also the Torneo Tigo Clausura for sponsorship reasons, is the second championship of the season. It began on July 16 and ended December 12.

=== Standings ===
Pos	Team	Pld	W	D	L	GF	GA	GD	Pts	Qualification or relegation
1	Libertad	22	16	1	5	46	15	+31	49	2011 Copa Libertadores Second Stage
2	Cerro Porteño	22	13	7	2	36	18	+18	46	
3	Nacional	22	12	6	4	29	18	+11	42	
4	Guaraní	22	10	6	6	29	22	+7	36	
5	Olimpia	22	7	11	4	31	23	+8	32	
6	Rubio Ñu	22	7	7	8	25	32	−7	28	
7	Sport Colombia	22	5	9	8	23	30	−7	24	
8	Tacuary	22	6	5	11	20	29	−9	23	
9	Sol de América	22	5	5	12	20	28	−8	20	
10	3 de Febrero	22	4	7	11	19	34	−15	19	
11	Sportivo Trinidense	22	3	9	10	25	46	−21	18	
12	Sportivo Luqueño	22	2	11	9	21	29	−8	17	

Source: APF
Rules for classification: 1st points. If two teams are tied on points, a playoff game will be held to break the tie. If more than two clubs are tied on points, the following will be used as a tiebreaker: 1st goal difference; 2nd goals scored; 3rd away-goals scored; 4th draw of lots

Copa TIGO
2010 Clausura champion
Libertad
15th title

=== Results ===
Home \ Away	3FE	CEP	GUA	LIB	NAC	OLI	RÑU	SOL	SPC	SPL	TAC	TRI
3 de Febrero		0–1	4–0	2–1	1–2	0–3	3–0	1–1	0–3	0–0	0–0	0–2
Cerro Porteño	3–0		2–1	2–0	1–1	1–1	2–0	2–0	0–0	1–1	1–3	3–1
Guaraní	2–1	1–2		2–0	0–0	0–0	1–2	1–0	3–0	1–0	1–0	0–1
Libertad	5–0	2–0	2–0		1–0	2–2	2–1	3–0	4–0	3–1	3–0	7–0
Nacional	1–0	0–0	0–1	1–0		0–2	0–0	2–0	4–3	2–0	1–0	4–1
Olimpia	2–0	2–2	2–2	0–2	1–2		1–4	0–0	3–0	1–1	2–1	1–1
Rubio Ñu	1–1	1–2	2–2	1–3	1–1	2–2		2–1	1–0	2–2	1–2	1–0
Sol de América	0–1	1–2	1–2	0–1	1–0	1–0	4–0		1–2	2–1	0–1	2–2
Sport Colombia	1–1	1–1	1–1	1–0	1–2	0–0	2–0	2–0		0–0	1–3	1–1
Sportivo Luqueño	3–3	1–3	0–3	1–2	0–1	0–0	0–1	1–1	1–1		2–0	0–0
Tacuary	2–0	0–1	1–1	0–1	1–2	1–4	0–0	1–1	2–1	0–3		0–1
Sportivo Trinidense	1–1	1–5	1–4	1–2	3–3	1–2	1–2	1–3	2–2	2–2	1–1	

Source: APF (in Spanish)
Legend: Blue = home team win; Yellow = draw; Red = away team win.

=== Top goalscorers ===
Pos	Player	Nationality	Club	Goals
1	Juan Carlos Ferreyra	Argentine	Olimpia	12
1	Roberto Nanni	Argentine	Cerro Porteño	12
3	Ángel Orué	Paraguayan	Libertad	9
4	Ariel Bogado	Paraguayan	Nacional	8
4	Manuel Maciel	Paraguayan	Libertad	8
6	Néstor Camacho	Paraguayan	Rubio Ñú	6
6	Jonathan Fabbro	Paraguayan	Guaraní	6
6	Pablo Zeballos	Paraguayan	Cerro Porteño	6
9	Julián Benítez	Paraguayan	Guaraní	5
9	Nery Cardozo	Paraguayan	Rubio Ñú	5
9	Hugo Luzardi	Paraguayan	Sportivo Luqueño	5
9	Jorge Núñez	Paraguayan	Cerro Porteño	5
9	Luis Ovelar	Paraguayan	Sportivo Luqueño	5
9	Sergio Samudio	Paraguayan	3 de Febrero	5

== International qualification ==
The two tournament champions earn the Paraguay 1 and Paraguay 2 berths in the Second Stage of the 2011 Copa Libertadores. All remaining international qualification will be determined through a season-wide aggregate table. The Paraguay 3 in the 2011 Copa Libertadores berth goes to the best-placed non-champion. For the 2011 Copa Sudamericana, the Paraguay 1 berth goes to the highest placed champion. Paraguay 2 and Paraguay 3 will go to the highest placed teams who have not qualified to an international tournament.

Pos	Team	Pld	W	D	L	GF	GA	GD	Pts	Qualification or relegation
1	Cerro Porteño	44	27	10	7	74	41	+33	91	2011 Copa Libertadores First Stage
2	Libertad	44	27	6	11	79	30	+49	87	2011 Copa Libertadores Second Stage and 2011 Copa Sudamericana Second Stage (Note: Libertad and Guaraní qualified to the 2011 Copa Libertadores as the Clausura and Apertura champion, respectively.)
3	Guaraní	44	25	10	9	72	42	+30	85	2011 Copa Libertadores Second Stage
4	Nacional	44	22	11	11	60	40	+20	77	2011 Copa Sudamericana First Stage
5	Olimpia	44	18	17	9	63	41	+22	71	2011 Copa Sudamericana First Stage
6	Rubio Ñu	44	17	15	12	61	57	+4	66	
7	Sol de América	44	12	9	23	47	67	−20	45	
8	Sportivo Luqueño	44	7	21	16	47	60	−13	42	
9	Sport Colombia	44	9	14	21	44	70	−26	41	
10	3 de Febrero	44	9	12	23	36	66	−30	39	
11	Tacuary	44	9	11	24	40	73	−33	38	
12	Sportivo Trinidense	44	6	17	21	44	80	−36	35	

Rules for classification: 1st points. If two teams are tied on points, a playoff game will be held to break the tie. If more than two clubs are tied on points, the following will be used as a tiebreaker: 1st goal difference; 2nd goals scored; 3rd away-goals scored; 4th draw of lots

== Relegation ==
Relegations is determined at the end of the season by computing an average (Spanish: promedio) of the number of points earned per game over the past three seasons. The two teams with the lowest average is relegated to the División Intermedia for the following season.

Pos	Team	'08 Pts	'09 Pts	'10 Pts	Total Pts	Total Pld	Avg	Relegation
1	Libertad	101	82	87	270	132	2.0455	
2	Cerro Porteño	76	81	91	247	132	1.8712	
3	Guaraní	79	67	85	231	132	1.75	
4	Nacional	77	77	77	231	132	1.75	
5	Olimpia	54	70	71	195	132	1.4773	
6	Rubio Ñú	0	63	66	129	88	1.4659	
7	Sol de América	63	50	45	158	132	1.197	
8	Tacuary	52	64	37	155	132	1.1742	
9	Sportivo Luqueño	49	51	42	142	132	1.0758	
10	3 de Febrero	51	43	38	132	132	1	
11	Sport Colombia	0	0	41	41	44	0.9318	Relegated to the División Intermedia
12	Sportivo Trinidense	0	0	37	37	44	0.8409	Relegated to the División Intermedia

== See also ==
- 2010 in Paraguayan football
