= Felipe Villalba =

Paraguayan footballer (born 1985)

Personal information
- Full name: Felipe Santiago Villalba
- Date of birth: 14 March 1985 (age 41)
- Place of birth: General Higinio Morínigo, Paraguay
- Position: Midfielder

Senior career*
Years	Team	Apps	(Gls)
2008–2012	3 de Febrero		
2013–2014	Tacuary		
2014	Sportivo Carapeguá		
2015	Universitario de Pando	11	(1)
2016–?	Deportivo Santaní		
2021	Veraguas Club Deportivo	5	(0)
2022	Club Deportivo Universitario	2	(0)
- * Club domestic league appearances and goals

Felipe Villalba (born 14 March 1985) is a Paraguayan former professional footballer who played as a midfielder for 3 de Febrero, Tacuary, and Deportivo Santaní in Paraguay, for Universitario de Pando in Bolivia, and for Veraguas Club Deportivo and Club Deportivo Universitario in Panama.

== Career ==
=== 3 de Febrero ===
In March 2008, Villalba was recalled to the first-team of 3 de Febrerbo by coach Francisco Sosa to occupy the midfield, replacing Miguel Espínola.

After a 0–0 draw with Libertad during the Torneo Clausura in October 2008, the ABC Diario referred to Villalba as one of the biggest fighters, as the midfielder spoke that "I think we have taken a positive result" and "We couldn't win the three points that we were looking for but a draw with Libertad isn't unappreciated either".

He scored his first goal for 3 de Febrero in a 4–1 away loss against Cerro Porteño on 12 April 2009.

During the 2010 season, Villalba amassed 39 league appearances.

On 20 February 2011, Villalba was red carded in a 2–1 home defeat against Cerro Porteño. Villalba was expulsed after 19 minutes of the first half by referee Ulises Mereles for a strong elbow at Luis Caceres. On 21 February 2011, Villalba spoke with Ultima Hora newspaper stated that Cerro Porteño's Juan Manuel Lucero had treated him like an animal. "When I entered the pitch to greet him, he said to me "How are you, animal?". The midfielder showed himself as repented and asked for forgiveness, including to the fans of Cerro Porteño.

"I'm a temperamental player, when I play I do not want to lose and always win with my team, but I passed myself yesterday" – Vilallba added during his conversation with Ultima Hora on the 780 AM Radio.

Villalba's only goal of the 2011 season came in a 1–1 home draw with Guaraní on 30 April.

=== Tacuary ===
Villalba joined transferred to División Intermedia club Tacuary in January 2013. During the 2013 season, Villalba spoke with Diario Vanguardia of Ciudad del Este and expressed that he wished to be promoted with Tacuary to the Primera División.

=== Sportivo Carapeguá ===
Villalba appears for Sportivo Carapeguá in Paraguay's second division during 2014.

=== Universitario de Pando ===
Villalba joined Bolivian club Universitario de Pando in January 2015 and debuted for the side in a 1–1 home draw with Jorge Wilstermann on 19 February.

On 12 April 2015, he scored in a 2–2 home draw against The Strongest.

=== Deportivo Santaní ===
In 2016, Villalba joined the club based in San Estanislao for the División Intermedia.
