= Antony Silva =

Paraguayan footballer (born 1984)

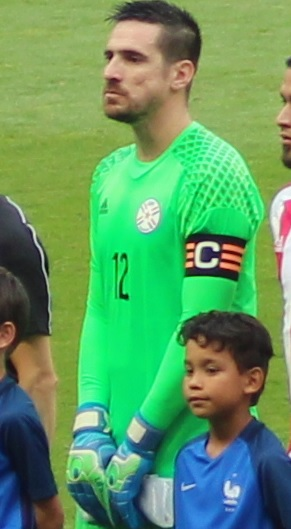
- Silva with Paraguay in 2017

Personal information
- Full name: Antony Domingo Silva Cano
- Date of birth: 27 February 1984 (age 42)
- Place of birth: Asunción, Paraguay
- Height: 1.90 m (6 ft 3 in)
- Position: Goalkeeper

Youth career
- 1997–2000: Cerro Corá

Senior career*
Years	Team	Apps	(Gls)
2000–2002	Cerro Corá	23	(0)
2003–2006	Libertad	19	(0)
2005	→ General Caballero (loan)	9	(0)
2006	→ 2 de Mayo (loan)	20	(0)
2007–2008	Tacuary	20	(0)
2008	→ Talleres de Córdoba (loan)	7	(0)
2009	Marília	14	(0)
2009–2010	Rubio Ñu	22	(0)
2010–2014	Deportes Tolima	140	(0)
2014	3 de Febrero	33	(0)
2015	Independiente Medellín	35	(0)
2016–2018	Cerro Porteño	123	(0)
2019–2020	Huracán	30	(0)
2020	Nacional	9	(0)
2021–2023	Puebla	92	(0)
2023	Independiente Santa Fe	19	(0)
2024	Nacional	22	(0)

International career^{‡}
2001	Paraguay U17	8	(0)
2002–2003	Paraguay U20	13	(0)
2003	Paraguay U23	3	(0)
2011–2023	Paraguay	56	(0)
- * Club domestic league appearances and goals as of 14:09, 27 April 2025 (UTC) ‡ National team caps and goals as of 14:09, 27 April 2025 (UTC)

Antony Domingo Silva Cano (born 27 February 1984) is a Paraguayan professional footballer who plays as goalkeeper for the Paraguay national team. He also holds Italian citizenship.

== Career ==
Silva began his career in the youth ranks of Club Cerro Corá. In 2000, he made his professional debut with the club.

=== Libertad ===
Silva was signed by Club Libertad in 2003. During the 2004 Copa Libertadores, Silva helped Libertad to a famous 1–0 win over Argentine club River Plate in a match played at Defensores del Chaco on 7 April. Argentina's Clarín raved about Silva's performance, stating: "The goalkeeper Anthony Silva was the big star: he closed off all roads to the Argentines."

==== Loan to General Caballero ZC ====
After being primarily the reserve goalkeeper for Libertad, Silva joined General Caballero on loan during the 2005 season. Silva's rights were purchased by Italian club Genoa but never officially joined the Italian side.

==== Loan to 2 de Mayo ====
In 2006 Silva signed on loan with Club 2 de Mayo and established himself as the teams' main goalkeeper. During Silva's loan to 2 de Mayo, he was coached by Saturnino Arua and was teammates with Salustiano Candia. On 15 March 2006, gave apologies for making improper gestures at the public after being replaced after conceding his side's fourth goal in a defeat to Nacional Asunción, showing his middle finger to the preference section at the Estadio Defensores del Chaco.

"They are things that occur. I reacted in that moment because I was angry and what I did was a matter of in the moment, because I don't have a past with actions of this type. Also, I don't know to who I showed it to, and the only thing that I can say is ask for apologies to the people who felt offended by my actions."' – Antony Silva apologizing about his reaction to the crowd in a game against Nacional Asunción

=== Tacuary ===
After an impressive season with the club, Harry Redknapp brought Antony Silva on trial at Portsmouth. Silva could not agree to terms, and decided to sign for Club Tacuary of Paraguay.

==== Loan to Talleres de Córdoba ====
After an impressive season with Club Tacuary in which he played in the Copa Libertadores, Silva left Paraguay and was signed by Argentine side Talleres de Córdoba. Silva only played 7 games for Talleres in 2008.

=== Marília ===
In 2009 moved to Brazil to play for Marília Atlético Clube.

=== Rubio Ñu ===
After a brief spell in Brazil, Silva returned to Paraguay and signed for Club Rubio Ňú and quickly established himself as the main goalkeeper. On 29 January 2010 Silva was suspended by the Paraguayan Football Federation for doping, which Silva denied. Following the suspension it was reported that New York Red Bulls was interested in Silva.

=== Deportes Tolima ===
Silva signed in June 2010 with Deportes Tolima of Colombia, with which Silva played 140 matches.

=== 3 de Febrero ===
In February 2014, Silva was officially presented as new goalkeeper for Ciudad del Este club 3 de Febrero for the Primera División season, returning to play in Paraguay after four years. Silva still had a contract with his club in Colombia until 30 June 2014, but some administration differences forced his exit. Since the beginnings of 2014, Odair dos Santos from 3 de Febrero intended to count with Silva at the club.

=== Independiente Medellín ===
On 28 December 2014, El Colombiano confirmed Antony Silva's signing as new goalkeeper of Independiente de Medellin for the 2015 campaign. Silva was the club's second new signing following the acquisition of attacker Juan Fernando Caicedo.

=== Cerro Porteño ===
He signed with Cerro Porteño as a reinforcement for the 2016 Copa Libertadores.

== International career ==
Silva has represented Paraguay at various youth levels. In 2001 Silva participated for Paraguay in the Under-17 World Cup and in 2003 participated in the Under-20 World Cup helping his nation reach the knock out stages. He played 3 matches in the 2003 Pan American Games. He was part of the squad that played in the 2015 Copa América, where he played 2 matches. He also was selected for the squad that competed in the Copa América Centenario.

In the 2021 Copa América, Paraguay's press hailed Silva as the figure for his saves during a quarter-final penalty shootout against Peru, which Paraguay ultimately lost. Silva saved penalties from Santiago Ormeño and Christian Cueva before Paraguay lost 4–3 in the shoot-out.

== Career statistics ==
=== Club ===
This table is incomplete, thus some stats and totals could be incorrect.

Appearances and goals by club, season and competition
Club	Season	League			National cup		Continental		Total	
Club	Season	Division	Apps	Goals	Apps	Goals	Apps	Goals	Apps	Goals
Libertad	2003	Paraguayan Primera División	2	0	—		—		2	0
Libertad	2004	Paraguayan Primera División	8	0	—		—		8	0
Libertad	2005	Paraguayan Primera División	2	0	—		—		2	0
Libertad	2006	Paraguayan Primera División	7	0	—		—		7	0
Libertad	Total		19	0	0	0	0	0	19	0
General Caballero (loan)	2005	Paraguayan Primera División	9	0	—		—		9	0
2 de Mayo (loan)	2006	Paraguayan Primera División	20	0	—		—		20	0
Tacuary	2007	Paraguayan Primera División	20	0	—		—		20	0
Talleres de Córdoba (loan)	2008	Primera B Nacional	7	0	—		—		7	0
Marília	2009	Campeonato Paulista	14	0	—		—		14	0
Rubio Ñu	2009	Paraguayan Primera División	21	0	—		—		21	0
Rubio Ñu	2010	Paraguayan Primera División	1	0	—		—		1	0
Rubio Ñu	Total		22	0	0	0	0	0	22	0
Deportes Tolima	2010	Categoría Primera A	24	0	—		6	0	30	0
Deportes Tolima	2011	Categoría Primera A	39	0	2	0	8	0	49	0
Deportes Tolima	2012	Categoría Primera A	39	0	1	0	3	0	43	0
Deportes Tolima	2013	Categoría Primera A	38	0	4	0	8	0	50	0
Deportes Tolima	2014	Categoría Primera A	0	0	0	0	0	0	0	0
Deportes Tolima	Total		140	0	7	0	25	0	172	0
3 de Febrero	2014	Paraguayan Primera División	33	0	0	0	0	0	33	0
Independiente Medellín	2015	Categoría Primera A	35	0	1	0	0	0	36	0
Cerro Porteño	2016	Paraguayan Primera División	32	0	0	0	14	0	46	0
Career total		351	0	8	0	39	0	398	0	

=== International ===
Appearances and goals by national team and year
National team	Year	Apps	Goals
Paraguay	2011	2	0
Paraguay	2012	1	0
Paraguay	2013	1	0
Paraguay	2014	2	0
Paraguay	2015	8	0
Paraguay	2016	2	0
Paraguay	2017	9	0
Paraguay	2018	1	0
Paraguay	2019	3	0
Paraguay	2020	3	0
Paraguay	2021	15	0
Paraguay	2022	1	0
Total		48	0

== Honours ==
Club Libertad

- Primera División: 2003, 2006

Deportes Tolima

- Categoría Primera A runner-up: 2010 Finalización

Independiente Medellín

- Categoría Primera A runner-up: 2015 Apertura
