= Cristaldo =

Cristaldo is a surname of Spanish and Italian origin. Notable individuals with this surname include:

- Blas Cristaldo (born 1964), Paraguayan former footballer
- Christopher Cristaldo (born 1995), Australian footballer
- Ernesto Cristaldo (born 1984), Paraguayan footballer
- Franco Cristaldo (born 1996), Argentine footballer
- Gustavo Cristaldo (born 1989), Paraguayan footballer
- Jonatan Cristaldo (born 1989), Argentine footballer
- Luis Cristaldo (born 1969), Argentine former footballer
- Victor Cristaldo (born 1967), Australian former footballer
- Wanderson Cristaldo Farias (born 1988), Brazilian footballer
