= Mereles =

Mereles is a surname. Notable people with this surname include:

- Carlos Antonio Mereles (born 1979), midfielder
- Exequiel Mereles (born 2005), Uruguayan professional footballer
- Fátima Mereles (born 1953), Paraguayan botanist
- Marcos Mereles, Argentine filmmaker
