= Luis Páez (footballer, born 1989) =

Paraguayan footballer (1989–2019)

Personal information
- Full name: Luis Fernando Páez González
- Date of birth: 19 December 1989
- Place of birth: Lambaré, Paraguay
- Date of death: 7 April 2019 (aged 29)
- Place of death: Mariano Roque Alonso, Paraguay
- Height: 1.89 m (6 ft 2 in)
- Position: Forward

Youth career
- –2006: Tacuary
- 2007–2008: Sporting CP

Senior career*
Years	Team	Apps	(Gls)
2006–2007	Tacuary	3	(0)
2007–2009	Sporting CP	2	(0)
2008–2009	→ Fátima (loan)	24	(6)
2009–2011	Tacuary	16	(1)
2010	→ Gallipoli (loan)	7	(0)
2014	Tacuary		
2015	Cristóbal Colón		
2015–2019	Independiente CG		

International career
2009	Paraguay U20	6	(0)
- * Club domestic league appearances and goals

Luis Fernando Páez González (19 December 1989 – 7 April 2019) was a Paraguayan footballer who played as a forward.

Páez represented the Paraguay under-20 national team at the 2009 South American U-20 Championship, finishing runners-up, and also at the 2009 FIFA U-20 World Cup.

== Early career ==
Páez was part of the junior teams of Primera División Paraguaya club Tacuary where he played in the same category alongside team-mates Ronald Huth and Hernán Pérez. He was called up to the club's first-team during the 2006 season, where he made one league appearance. He amassed two more league appearances in 2007 before departing the club to join Sporting CP.

== Club career ==
=== Sporting CP ===
==== 2007–08 season ====
Páez joined Sporting CP in July 2007 for a fee of €138,000 and was registered with the number #58. For the entire duration of the 2007–08 season, he was also a member of the Sporting CP U-19 Juniores team where he scored 4 goals in 8 league appearances. Páez was included in Lison's 18-man squad for their 2007–08 UEFA Champions League 2–1 group stage match away loss fixture against Manchester United on 27 November 2007. On 8 December 2007, Páez made his first appearance of the 2007–08 Taça de Portugal in a fourth round 1–0 win match against Louletano. Páez was substituted onto the field in the 79th minute of Milan Purović. Páez eventually debuted in the UEFA Champions League in a 3–0 home victory against Dynamo Kyiv on 12 December 2007. Páez was substituted onto the field for Milan Purović in the 86th minute. He debuted in the 2007–08 Primeira Liga in a 2–0 away loss against Boavista on 5 January 2008, when Páez was substituted onto the field for Milan Purović in the 72nd minute. Páez made his first and only appearance in the 2007–08 Taça da Liga (Carlsberg Cup) in a 1–0 away loss to Vitória on 9 January 2008. Páez made his second appearance in the Primeira Liga in a 1–1 away draw against Académica de Coimbra on 13 January 2008. Páez was substituted onto the field for Marat Izmaylov in the 63rd minute of the match. Páez had made a total of 5 appearances for Sporting in all competitions.

==== 2008–09 season ====
Having made just two league appearances during the 2007–08 season, Páez eventually spent the 2008–09 season on loan with CD Fátima where he participated in the 2008–09 Segunda Divisão and was registered with the number No. 9. On 24 August 2008, Páez debuted in the 2008–09 Segunda Divisão in a 2–1 away victory against Tourizense, where he was substituted onto the field in the 72nd minute for Miguel Neves. On 19 October 2008, Páez debuted in the 2008–09 Taça de Portugal in a 1–1 draw against C.D. Feirense, scoring a penalty in the 1st minute of the match to give Fátima a 1–0 lead. CD Fátima went on to win the match 4–1 on penalties. On 25 October 2008, Páez scored his first goals for CD Fátima, a double, in a 3–2 away victory against CD Operário. Páez scored a penalty in the 58th minute to tie the scores level at 2–2 and then scored the winner in the 92nd minute. Two weeks later, Páez made his second appearance in the 2008–09 Taça de Portugal during a 1–0 loss against CD Cinfães on 9 November 2008. Páez was substituted onto the field in the 80th minute for Vasco Varão. Páez scored his third league goal in a 1–1 away draw against Monsanto on 14 December 2008. He scored via penalty in the 50th minute of the match to level the scores. His fourth league goal came in a 4–1 away victory, again against Monsanto on 29 March 2009. Páez had scored a 27th-minute penalty to give CD Fátima a 2–0 lead. CD Fátima had finished in first place of their category, Série C, and qualified for the Championship Playoffs. On 24 May 2008, Páez was substituted onto the field for Ismael Gaúcho in the 60th minute and scored CD Fátima's fourth goal in the 70th minute in their 4–1 second-leg semi-final play-off victory against Carregado. CD Fátima won the tie 5–2 on aggregate and progressed to the final. During the final, Páez scored CD Fátima's second goal in the 45th minute in their 2–1 victory against G.D. Chaves on 5 May 2009. CD Fátima gained promotion to the Segunda Liga for the 2009–10 season as Páez had made 26 appearances and scored 7 goals in all competitions.

=== Tacuary ===
==== 2010 season ====
During the 2010 winter transfer window, Páez joined Italian Serie B club Gallipoli Calcio on a 6-month loan period.

Upon returning to Tacuary from Europe in 2010, began what he described as "hell" when he barely played in the matches and then raptured ligaments which left him out of the field for more than six months. His first appearance in the 2010 Paraguayan Primera División season came in a 2–0 home victory against 3 de Febrero on 1 August. He had played a full-90 minutes of the match and scored Tacuary's second goal in the 55th minute.

He underwent the operation and the recuperation process but his obsession in return to football accelerated his recovery. He then met persons who said that they were in charge of taking Paez to the most important clubs of the continent. Player agents from Argentina, they had promised Paez that they would take him everywhere. Paez had a dispute with Francisco Ocampos, the boss of Tacuary and player agent of Tacuary players, and began a lawsuit. He traveled to Argentina and Uruguay to intent to unite himself with clubs, but never came out of the hotels. The agents informed him that everything was organized but nothing would happen. Paez would train in places around the hotel and go running. He did not know anyone in those countries. Paez thought about stop playing football, the agents would give him a monthly remittance but he wanted to play and did not importance the money. Paez regressed to Tacuary and spoke with Francisco Ocampo who had the lawsuit, he gave his apologies and admitted that the mistake was for ignorance and for being young.

He then stated a message for the youngsters after almost giving up play football and say to them not think too much in the money because money is not everything. "Anyone can say I will pay you two million dollars, don't fall for that. Not everything that shines is gold".

=== Cristobal Colón ===
Paez scored against Independiente CG for Cristobal Colón in June 2015 in Paraguay's División Intermedia.

=== Independiente Campo Grande ===
During the 2015 División Intermedia, Páez scored in a 3–1 home victory against his former club Tacuary on 24 July 2015.

== International career ==
In January 2009, Páez was selected for the Paraguay under-20 team to participate at the 2009 South American Youth Championship in Venezuela.

== Death ==
Páez died on 7 April 2019, after a car crash.

== Career statistics ==
=== Club ===
Appearances and goals by club, season and competition
Club	Season	League		Cup		Continental		Total	
Club	Season	Apps	Goals	Apps	Goals	Apps	Goals	Apps	Goals
Tacuary	2006	1	0	–		–		1	0
Sporting CP	2007–08	2	0	2	0	1	0	5	0
Fátima (loan)	2008–09	24	6	2	1	–		26	7
Tacuary	2009	13	0	–		–		13	0
Tacuary	2010	3	1	–		–		3	1
Tacuary	2011	0	0	–		–		0	0
Tacuary	Total	16	1	0	0	0	0	16	1
Gallipoli (loan)	2009–10	7	0	–		–		7	0
Career total		50	7	4	1	1	0	55	8

== Honours ==
Sporting CP

- Taça de Portugal: 2007–08
