= Elio Mora =

Paraguayan footballer (born 1977)

Elio Alberto Mora (born 14 January 1977) is a Paraguayan former professional footballer who played as a forward.

== Career ==
- General Caballero 2003–2004
- Deportes Puerto Montt 2004
- Tacuary 2005
- General Caballero 2005–2008
- Sport Colombia 2009–2010
- Deportivo Santaní 2011–2012
