= Ignacio Paniagua =

Paraguayan footballer (born 1979)

Ignacio Paniagua (born September 20, 1979 in Ybycuí, Paraguay) is a Paraguayan footballer currently playing for Fernando de la Mora of the División Intermedia in Paraguay.

== Teams ==
- (Paraguay) Deportivo Recoleta 1997-1998
- (Paraguay) Guaraní 1999
- (Paraguay) 3 de Febrero 2000-2001
- (Paraguay) Deportivo Recoleta 2002
- (Paraguay) General Caballero 2003
- (Paraguay) Sport Colombia 2004
- (Paraguay) Tacuary 2005
- (Uruguay) Nacional 2006
- (Paraguay) Tacuary 2006-2007
- (Paraguay) Sportivo Luqueño 2008
- (Paraguay) Tacuary 2009-2010
- (Paraguay) Fernando de la Mora 2011–present
