= Ángel Orué =

Paraguayan footballer (born 1989)

Personal information
- Full name: Ángel Reinaldo Orué Echeverría
- Date of birth: 5 January 1989 (age 37)
- Place of birth: Luque, Paraguay
- Height: 1.85 m (6 ft 1 in)
- Position: Forward

Youth career
- 2004–2008: Libertad

Senior career*
Years	Team	Apps	(Gls)
2009–2011	Libertad	33	(13)
2011	Santiago Wanderers	14	(3)
2012–2013	Nacional	38	(7)
2013–2015	Libertad	8	(0)
2014	→ 12 de Octubre (loan)	15	(2)
2014	→ Douglas Haig (loan)	18	(4)
2015	→ CD San José (loan)	5	(1)
2015	→ LDU Loja (loan)	17	(2)
2016	Skënderbeu Korçë	1	(0)
2016–2017	Ayacucho	4	(0)
2017	Rubio Ñu	5	(0)
2018	General Díaz	6	(2)
2018	3 de Febrero	9	(1)
2019	Guaireña		
- * Club domestic league appearances and goals as of 19:44, 31 May 2020 (UTC)

Ángel Reinaldo Orué Echeverría (Spanish pronunciation: [ˈaŋxel oˈrwe], born 5 January 1989) is a Paraguayan footballer. Emerged from Libertad youth ranks, he debuted in 2009 and the following season, was part of the squad that won its fifteenth league title. In mid–2011, after a regular season, he left the Asunción based–club for Santiago Wanderers in Chile, but after another unsuccessful spell, he returned to Paraguay for Nacional.

== Honours ==
Libertad

- Torneo de Clausura: 2010
