= Rodolfo Guillén =

Paraguayan footballer

Personal information
- Full name: Rodolfo Alejo Guillén Jara
- Date of birth: 25 July 1986 (age 40)
- Place of birth: Capiatá, Paraguay
- Height: 1.83 m (6 ft 0 in)
- Position: Defender

Senior career*
Years	Team	Apps	(Gls)
2006–2008	12 de Octubre		
2009	Cobreloa	26	(1)
2010	Sport Colombia	13	(0)
2010–2011	Independiente FBC		
2011–2012	Sportivo San Lorenzo		
2012–2013	Fernando de la Mora		
2013–2014	Sportivo Carapeguá		
2014–2017	Olimpia Itá		
2017	Caacupé FBC		
2018	Martín Ledesma		
2018	Tacuary		
2021–2022	Martín Ledesma		

International career
- Paraguay U23
- * Club domestic league appearances and goals

Rodolfo Alejo Guillén Jara (born 25 July 1986) is a Paraguayan former footballer who played as a defender.
