= 2005 Paraguayan Primera División season =

- Season: 2005
- Champions: Cerro Porteño (27th title)
- Relegated: General Caballero
- Copa Libertadores: Cerro Porteño; Libertad; Nacional
- Copa Sudamericana: Cerro Porteño; Libertad

The 2005 Paraguayan Championship of the Primera División of Paraguay took place from February 11 to December 10, with the participation of ten clubs. The season consisted of three stages: the Apertura Tournament, which was won by Cerro Porteño; the Clausura Tournament, which was also claimed by Cerro Porteño, thus crowning them as the 2005 Season's Absolute Champion for the 27th time in its history.

== Apertura Tournament 2005 ==
The tournament began on February 11 and concluded on June 25. The format was a round-robin system, with home and away matches, played over 18 rounds. Cerro Porteño emerged as champions, earning a spot in the 2005 Copa Sudamericana.

=== Standings ===
Pos.	Teams	MP	W	D	L	GF	GA	GD	Pts.
1.	Cerro Porteño	18	10	6	2	30	15	15	36
2.	Guaraní	18	9	4	5	21	18	3	31
3.	Nacional	18	9	3	6	25	22	3	30
4.	3 de Febrero	18	7	7	4	24	17	7	28
5.	12 de Octubre	18	6	8	4	22	22	0	26
6.	Tacuary	18	4	11	3	24	19	5	23
7.	Libertad	18	4	7	7	21	23	-2	19
8.	Sportivo Luqueño	18	3	8	7	20	22	-2	17
9.	General Caballero	18	2	7	9	16	28	-12	13
10.	Olimpia	18	2	7	9	10	27	-17	13

Pos=Position; MP=Matches played; W=Matches won; D=Matches drawn; L=Matches lost; GF=Goals for; GA=Goals against; GD=Goal difference; Pts=Points

=== Pre-Sudamericana 2005 ===
A play-off was held between the teams finishing in 2nd to 5th place. The winner earned a spot in the 2005 Copa Sudamericana.

Guaraní secured the spot by defeating Nacional 2–1 in the final match.

==== Semifinals ====
June 29, 2005

Nacional	3–1 (0–0)	3 de Febrero
Ariel Bogado 46'; Troadio Duarte 65'; Dante López 84'		Domingo Ortiz 56'

Defensores del Chaco
Referee: Carlos Amarilla (PAR)
June 29, 2005

Guaraní	2–1 (1–0)	12 de Octubre
Edgar González 8'; Osvaldo Díaz 90'		Ignacio Rolón 74'

Defensores del Chaco
Attendance: 1,141
Referee: Nelson Valenzuela

==== Final ====
July 3, 2005

Guaraní	2–1 (1–1)	Nacional
Carlos Recalde 8'; Osvaldo Díaz 88'		Víctor Quintana 35'

Defensores del Chaco
Attendance: 3,398
Referee: Carlos Torres (PAR)

== 2005 Clausura Tournament ==
The tournament began on August 5 and ended on December 10. The competition format was a round-robin system, with 18 matchdays played, with home and away matches. The champion was Cerro Porteño.

=== Standings ===
Pos.	Teams	MP	W	D	L	GF	GA	GD	Pts.
1.	Cerro Porteño	18	11	3	4	34	20	14	36
2.	Libertad	18	9	5	4	30	23	7	32
3.	Olimpia	18	9	4	5	29	20	9	31
4.	3 de Febrero	18	8	4	6	31	25	6	28
5.	Nacional	18	7	6	5	24	20	4	27
6.	Sportivo Luqueño	18	6	7	5	27	26	1	25
7.	Tacuary	18	6	6	6	26	31	-5	24
8.	Guaraní	18	6	2	10	18	25	-7	20
9.	12 de Octubre	18	2	8	8	18	33	-15	14
10.	General Caballero	18	3	1	14	15	29	-14	10

Pos=Position; MP=Matches played; W=Matches won; D=Matches drawn; L=Matches lost; GF=Goals for; GA=Goals against; GD=Goal difference; Pts=Points

=== Pre-Libertadores 2006 ===
A play-off was held between the runners-up of the Apertura and Clausura Tournaments. The winner would earn a spot in the 2006 Copa Libertadores.

Libertad won the spot with an aggregate score of 5–3 against Guaraní.

14 December 2005

Guaraní	2–1 (1–0)	Libertad
Cristian Sosa 18'; Julián Benítez 51'		Rodrigo López 71'

Defensores del Chaco
Attendance: 1,111
Referee: Carlos Amarilla
18 December 2005

Libertad	4–1 (1–0)	Guaraní
Cristian Riveros 5'; Gustavo Morínigo 69'; Gustavo Morínigo 73'; Rodrigo López 76'		Gilberto Velázquez 80'

Defensores del Chaco
Attendance: 2,358
Referee: Carlos Torres

== Accumulated points ==
Resulting from the sum of the Apertura and Clausura.

	Points	Played	Won	Drawn	Lost	GF	GA	GD
1 Club Cerro Porteño	72	36	21	9	6	64	35	+31
2 Club Nacional	57	36	16	9	11	49	42	+7
3 Club 3 de Febrero	56	36	15	11	10	55	42	+13
4 Club Libertad	51	36	13	12	11	51	46	+5
5 Club Guaraní	51	36	15	6	15	39	43	-4
6 Club Tacuary	47	36	10	17	9	50	50	0
7 Club Olimpia	44	36	11	11	14	39	47	-8
8 Club Sportivo Luqueño	42	36	9	15	12	47	48	-1
9 Club 12 de Octubre	40	36	8	16	12	40	55	-15
10 Club General Caballero	23	36	5	8	23	31	57	-16

Points=Pts; Played=PJ; Won=G; Drawn=E; Lost=P; GF=Goals For; GA=Goals Against; GD=Goal Difference

Qualified for 2006 Copa Libertadores and 2006 Copa Sudamericana
Qualified for 2006 Copa Libertadores
Qualified for 2006 Copa Sudamericana
Relegated to División Intermedia

== Relegations and promotions ==
- General Caballero was relegated to the División Intermedia, finishing in last place in the average standings.
- The clubs 2 de Mayo and Fernando de la Mora were promoted to the top division after finishing 1st and 2nd, respectively, in the División Intermedia tournament. As a result, the Primera División increased its number of participants to eleven for the 2006 season.
