= José Antonio Franco (footballer, born 1979) =

Paraguayan footballer (born 1979)

José Antonio Franco Arévalos (born 10 May 1979) is a Paraguayan former professional footballer who played as a forward.

== Career ==
- Sol de América 1997–2003
- Santiago Wanderers 2004
- 12 de Octubre 2004
- Rangers 2005
- Guaraní 2005
- Olimpia Asunción 2006
- Sol de América 2006–2007
- 3 de Febrero 2008
- Atlético Bucaramanga 2008
- Alianza Atlético 2009
- Sol de América 2009
- General Caballero 2010–2011
- Sport Colombia 2012
