= Richard Salinas =

Paraguayan footballer (born 1988)

Personal information
- Full name: Richard Adrián Salinas Benítez
- Date of birth: 6 February 1988 (age 38)
- Place of birth: Pirayu, Paraguay
- Height: 1.75 m (5 ft 9 in)
- Position: Left back

Team information
- Current team: Sportivo Iteño

Youth career
- 12 de Octubre

Senior career*
Years	Team	Apps	(Gls)
2005–2007	12 de Octubre	14	(0)
2007	3 de Febrero	7	(0)
2008	Sport Recife		
2009	Volta Redonda		
2009	SER Caxias do Sul		
2010–2012	Independiente CG	50	(0)
2012–2016	Olimpia Asunción	53	(0)
2016–2017	Nacional Asunción	27	(0)
2018–2019	Sport Huancayo	56	(1)
2020	River Plate Asunción	16	(0)
2021-	Sportivo Iteño	--	(--)

International career
2006–2007	Paraguay U20	13	(1)
2011–2012	Paraguay	2	(0)
- * Club domestic league appearances and goals as of 10:05, 20 December 2020 (UTC)

Richard Adrián Salinas Benítez (born 6 February 1988, in Asunción) is a Paraguayan footballer who plays as a defender for Sportivo Iteño in the Paraguayan División Intermedia.

== Career ==
Salinas was signed on 10 March 2008 but officially registered in August by Sport do Recife.

== International career ==
He capped for Paraguay U20 at 2007 South American Youth Championship.
