= Pedro Irala =

Paraguayan footballer (born 1979)

Personal information
- Full name: Pedro Richard Irala Vergara
- Date of birth: 14 April 1979 (age 47)
- Place of birth: Asunción, Paraguay
- Height: 1.83 m (6 ft 0 in)
- Position: Midfielder

Senior career*
Years	Team	Apps	(Gls)
2002–2003	Sport Colombia	50	(3)
2004–2005	Guaraní	59	(8)
2006	Cerro Porteño	7	(0)
2006–2007	12 de Octubre	37	(2)
2007–2008	Danubio	26	(4)
2008–2009	Olympiacos Volos	26	(3)
2009–2010	Rodos	?	(5)
2011	Sportivo Luqueño	3	(0)
2011–	Defensa y Justicia		

International career^{‡}
2003–	Paraguay	3	(0)
- * Club domestic league appearances and goals as of 2 July 2009 ‡ National team caps and goals as of 2 July 2009

Pedro Richard Irala (born 14 April 1979) is a former Paraguayan footballer. He previously played for Olympiacos Volos and Rodos in the Greek Beta Ethniki.

== Club career ==
Irala previously played for several Paraguayan teams like Sport Colombia, Guaraní and Cerro Porteño, and for Uruguayan side Danubio In 2008, he was transferred to Greece to play for Olympiacos Volos. In 2010, Ilioupoli showed interest in buying the player.
