= Ángel Antar =

Paraguayan footballer (born 1972)

Personal information
- Full name: Ángel Antar
- Date of birth: 18 February 1972 (age 54)
- Place of birth: Asunción, Paraguay
- Position: Defender

Senior career*
Years	Team	Apps	(Gls)
–	Galatasaray		
1996–1998	Sportivo San Lorenzo	35	(1)
1998	Libertad	8	(0)
2000	Sportivo San Lorenzo	15	(1)
2000–2001	Real Sociedad Zacatecas		
2001	Sportivo San Lorenzo		
2003	Deportivo Recoleta		(1)
2003	3 de Febrero		

International career
2000	Paraguay	2	(0)
- * Club domestic league appearances and goals

Ángel Antar (born 18 February 1972 in Asunción, Paraguay) is a retired Paraguayan association footballer.

== Career ==
In 2000, Antar's only goal of the season came against Cerro Porteño. In 2003, he scored one goal for Deportivo Recoleta in the Division Intermedia. In the same month, Antar transferred from Recoleta to 3 de Febrero in Ciudad del Este, in the same team as Oscar Cardozo. Antar played for Galatasary for one year and a half.

== International career ==
Antar debuted for Paraguay against Australia in 2000. His team mates in the squad featured José Luís Chilavert.
