= Enrique Meza Jr =

Mexican football coach (born 1979)

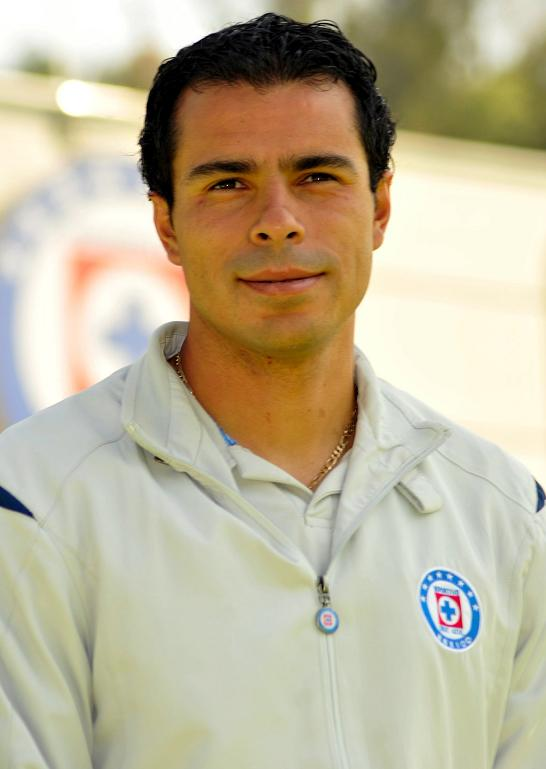
- Meza in 2011

Personal information
- Full name: Enrique Maximiliano Meza Salinas
- Date of birth: 14 November 1979 (age 46)
- Place of birth: Mexico City, Mexico
- Height: 1.74 m (5 ft 9 in)
- Position: Midfielder

Team information
- Current team: Necaxa (assistant)

Senior career*
Years	Team	Apps	(Gls)
2000–2001	Toluca		
2001–2002	Necaxa	0	(0)
2002	Gallos de Aguascalientes		
2003–2004	Cruz Azul	2	(0)
2003–2004	Cruz Azul Oaxaca	12	(0)
2005	Tacuary		
2005	Atlético Mexiquense	2	(0)
2006	Ciudad Juárez	3	(0)
2006	Alacranes de Durango	0	(0)
2007	Chiapas	6	(0)
2007	Jaguares de Tapachula		
Total		25	(0)

International career
1995	Mexico U17	7	(2)
2000	Mexico U23	8	(1)

Managerial career
- 2007–2008: Pachuca (assistant)
- 2010–2013: Cruz Azul (assistant)
- 2010–2012: Cruz Azul U17
- 2012–2013: Cruz Azul U20
- 2014: Santos de Guápiles
- 2015: Cartaginés
- 2016: Querétaro U20
- 2017: Melgar (youth)
- 2017–2018: Melgar
- 2018: Celaya
- 2019: Veracruz (assistant)
- 2019–2020: Toluca (youth)
- 2022: Carlos A. Mannucci
- 2025: Belize (assistant)
- 2026–: Necaxa (assistant)
- * Club domestic league appearances and goals

Enrique Maximiliano Meza Salinas (born 14 November 1979), sometimes known as Enrique Meza Jr., is a Mexican football coach and former player who played as a midfielder.

Meza spent the majority of his playing career in his native country before retiring in 2007. He became a coach shortly after, working as an assistant and technical coach for several sides before taking over as a first team manager in 2014 with Costa Rican side Santos de Guápiles.

Meza is the son of Enrique Meza, who is also a football manager.

== Playing career ==
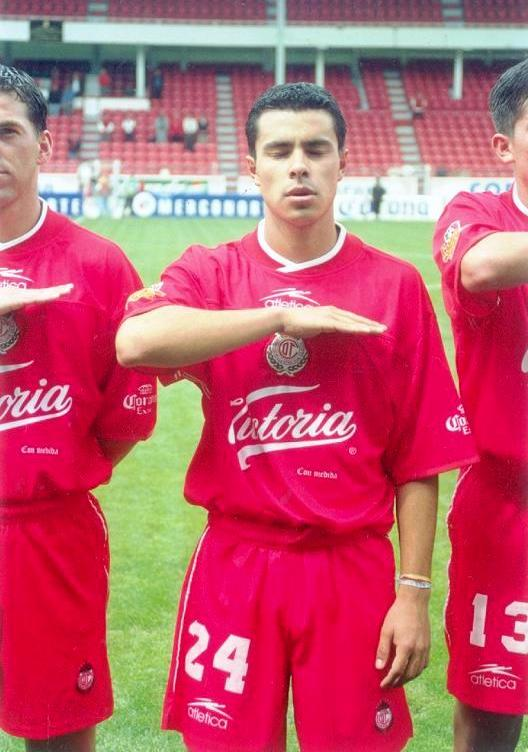
Meza playing for Toluca

Born in Mexico City, Meza made his senior debut with Toluca on 2 September 2000, in a 3–2 home win over Celaya. He then moved to Necaxa in 2001, but failed to establish himself as a regular starter for his new side and played for their reserve side at the time, Gallos Hidrocálidos de Aguascalientes.

In 2003, Meza joined Cruz Azul, but featured mainly for their reserve team Cruz Azul Oaxaca before moving abroad with Tacuary for the 2005 season. His period abroad also did not last long, as he returned to his home country with Atlético Mexiquense.

Meza subsequently represented Indios de Ciudad Juárez, Alacranes de Durango and Jaguares de Chiapas (where he featured mainly for their reserve team Jaguares de Tapachula) before retiring after the 2007 Apertura tournament, aged just 27.

== Coaching career ==
=== Early career ===
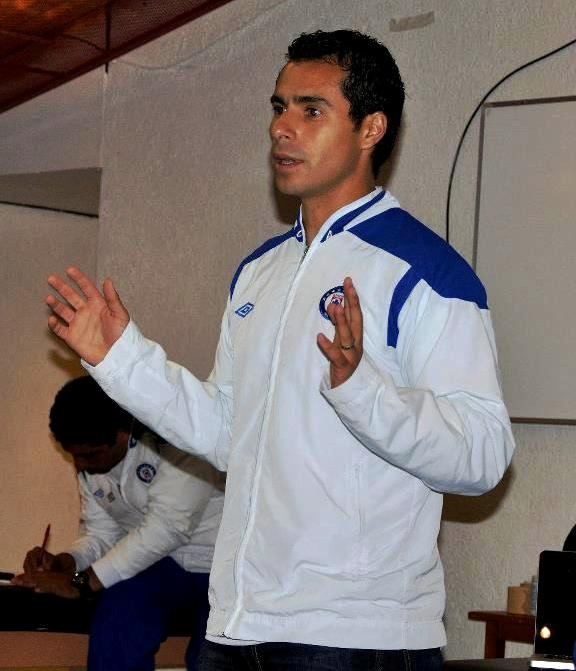
Meza coaching Cruz Azul's under-17 team in 2011

Shortly after retiring, Meza became his father's assistant coach at Pachuca, being a part of the staff when the club won two CONCACAF Champions' Cups and the 2007 Clausura. In 2009, while scouting for players in Ghana, due to heath scares about influenza, he was arrested for three days before being deported back to Mexico through Nigeria, despite having a permit to transit in the country.

In October 2009, when Paul Le Guen became manager of the Cameroon national team, Meza was invited to his coaching staff; he previously had spent a brief period with the national side back in 2008, when Thomas N'kono was their manager. He only spent one month with Le Guen before rejoining his father's staff at former club Cruz Azul in December 2009.

An assistant of his father and coach of the under-17 team, Meza led the under 17s to the final of the Mexican and South American clubs invitational Independence Cup, but lost the final to Boca Juniors. He left the club in 2013, and spent a period between January and May 2014 in Barcelona to undertake courses. In 2012, with the authorization of General Secretary: Horace Reid, Enrique consulted on technical analysis and report for the Jamaica Football Federation during the 2014 FIFA World Cup qualification matches for CONCACAF region.

=== Santos de Guápiles ===
On 16 May 2014, Costa Rican side Santos de Guápiles announced Meza as the club's technical director and head coach. After finishing ninth, he left the club on a mutual agreement in December.

=== Cartaginés ===
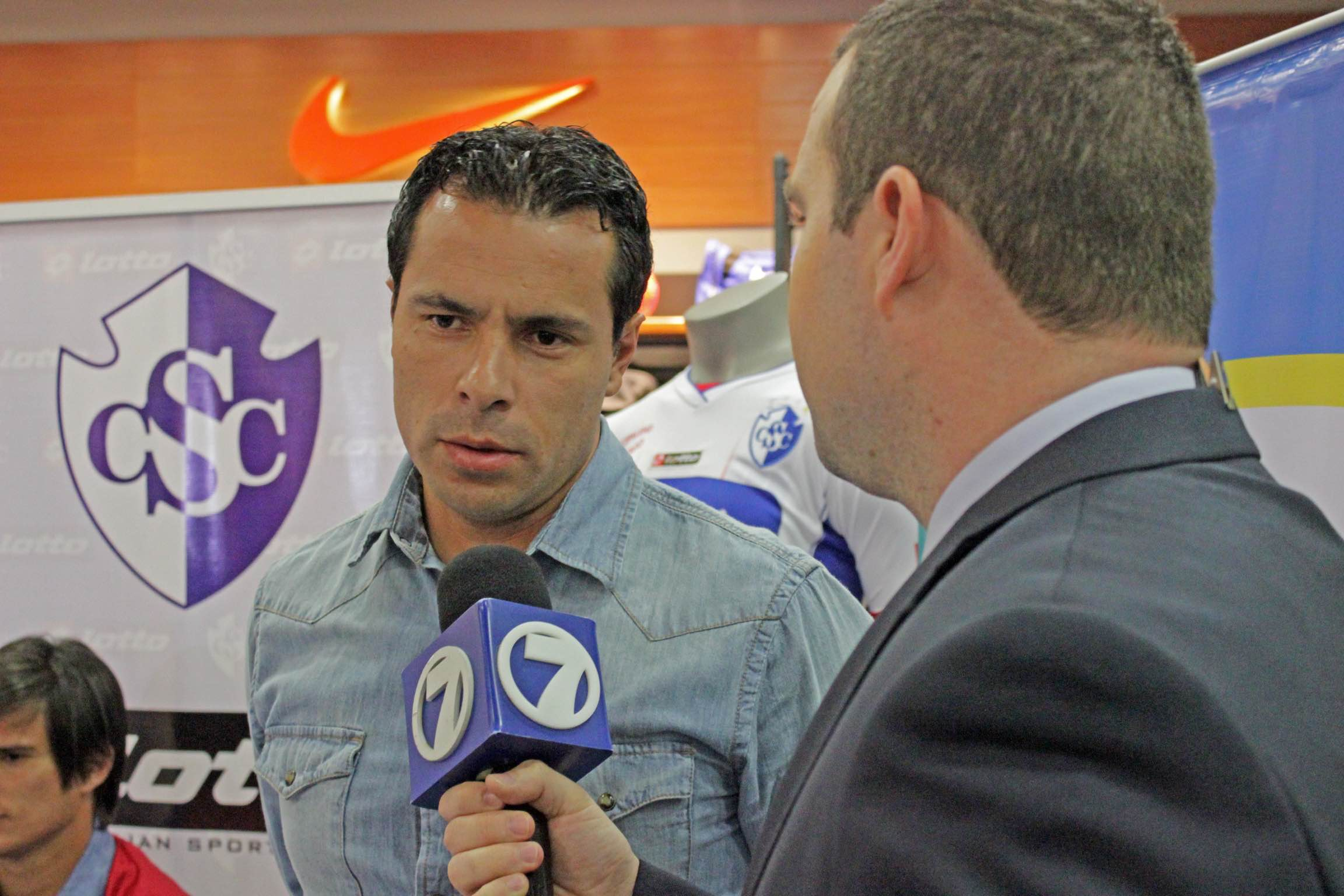
Meza (left) as manager of Cartaginés in 2015

On 14 January 2015, Meza was appointed manager of Cartaginés, still in Costa Rica. He was sacked on 12 March, after only three wins in 11 matches.

=== Querétaro ===
In 2016, Meza was the head coach and technical director of Querétaro's under-20 team. In June of that year, he was highly linked to become the manager of Guatemalan side Suchitepéquez, but the move never materialized.

=== Melgar ===
In January 2017, Meza moved to Peru and took over FBC Melgar's youth team. On 5 October of that year, he was named manager of the first team, and took the club to the 2018 Copa Libertadores.

Meza was maintained as manager for the 2018 campaign on 18 December 2017, but resigned on 29 April 2018.

=== Celaya ===
On 5 July 2018, Celaya presented Meza as head coach and technical director for the club. He was dismissed from the club on 6 December, with the side in the last position after 14 matches.

=== Veracruz ===
In June 2019, Meza returned to his home country to join his father's staff at Veracruz, as an assistant coach. In September, as his father was sacked, he also left the club.

=== Toluca ===
On 21 October 2019, Meza returned to his first senior club Toluca, being named new manager of the Fuerzas Básicas, the club's youth teams. The following 11 June, he was sacked.

=== Carlos A. Mannucci ===
On 7 November 2021, Peruvian side Carlos A. Mannucci announced that Meza will serve as their head coach for the 2022 season. He left on a mutual agreement the following 7 March, as the club failed to win any of their first four matches into the new season.

== Personal life ==
Meza's father, also named Enrique, was also a footballer and also works as a football manager. His brother José Diego is also a manager, and is often a part of his technical staff.
