= Carlos Antonio Mereles =

Paraguayan former footballer (born 1979)

Carlos Mereles
Personal information
- Full name: Carlos Antonio Mereles Cristaldo
- Date of birth: 9 July 1979 (age 47)
- Place of birth: Yaguarón, Paraguay
- Height: 1.80 m (5 ft 11 in)
- Position: Midfielder

Senior career*
Years	Team	Apps	(Gls)
2002–2004	Sport Colombia		
2005–2006	Tacuary		
2007–2009	Sportivo Luqueño		
2009	Guaraní		
2010	Sportivo Trinidense		
2010	3 de Febrero		
2011	Fernando de la Mora		
2012	General Caballero		
2012	Unión de Sunchales		
2013–2014	Independiente F.B.C.		
2013–2014	Adelante		
2015	Ocampo Fábrica		
- * Club domestic league appearances and goals

Carlos Antonio Mereles Cristaldo (born 9 July 1979 in Yaguarón, Paraguay) is a Paraguayan former professional footballer who played as a midfielder.
