= Rafael Baiano =

Brazilian footballer

Personal information
- Full name: Rafael Alexandrino dos Santos
- Date of birth: 8 October 1983 (age 43)
- Place of birth: Salvador, Brazil
- Position: Forward

Senior career*
Years	Team	Apps	(Gls)
2004–2006	Santo André		
2007–2008	FC Luzern		
2009	3 de Febrero		(4)
2010	Olimpia Asunción	13	(1)
2010–2011	3 de Febrero	15	(0)
2011	Independiente CG	9	(1)
2013	Santo André	5	(0)
2014	São Bento	12	(1)
2015	Água Santa		
2015	Foz do Iguaçu		
2016	Taubaté		
2016	São Bento		
2016	Maringá		
2017	Votuporanguense		
2018	Velo Clube		
- * Club domestic league appearances and goals

Rafael Alexandrino dos Santos (born 8 October 1983), commonly known as Rafael Baiano or Rafael Makanaki, is a Brazilian former footballer who played as a forward.

== Honours ==
Santo André

- Copa do Brasil: 2004
