= Christopher Cristaldo =

Paraguayan-born Australian soccer player

Personal information
- Full name: Christopher Andre Cristaldo Zambrini
- Date of birth: 15 January 1995 (age 31)
- Place of birth: Paraguay
- Height: 1.79 m (5 ft 10 in)
- Position: Forward

Team information
- Current team: Northcote City

Youth career
- Brimbank
- 2009: VIS
- 2011–2015: Melbourne Victory
- 2016: Melbourne City
- 2016: Nacional Asunción

Senior career*
Years	Team	Apps	(Gls)
2011	FFV NTC	18	(6)
2012–2015	Melbourne Victory	4	(1)
2014	Hume City	13	(1)
2015	Werribee City	11	(3)
2016	Melbourne City NPL	19	(10)
2016–2017	Port Melbourne	13	(2)
2017	St. Albans Saints	10	(0)
2018–2021	Moreland City	57	(12)
2021–	Northcote City	21	(3)

International career^{‡}
- Australia U17
2013	Australia U20	3	(2)
- * Club domestic league appearances and goals as of 18 November 2022 ‡ National team caps and goals as of 8 October 2013

Christopher Cristaldo Zambrini (born 15 January 1995) is a Paraguayan-born Australian footballer who plays as a forward for Moreland City.

== Club career ==
=== Youth career ===
In 2011, Cristaldo played for the Victorian Training Centre where he made 18 appearances and scored 1 goal in the 2011 Victorian Premier League.

=== Melbourne Victory ===
==== 2012–13 season ====
On 17 November 2012, Cristaldo debuted in the 2012–13 A-League season for Melbourne Victory when he was substituted onto the field for Andrew Nabbout in the 71st minute in a 2–2 home draw against the Central Coast Mariners.

He made his second appearance for Melbourne Victory on 23 March 2013. He was substituted onto the field in a home match against Perth Glory, replacing Argentine Marcos Flores, and scored an equalizer to draw the game at 2–2 in the 89th minute. Perth Glory ultimately scored in the 94th minute to win the match.

Cristaldo made his third appearance for the club in the 2012–13 season in a 3–2 away victory against Wellington Phoenix on 31 March 2013. He was substituted onto the field for New Zealander Marco Rojas.

==== 2013–14 season ====
On 4 January 2014, Cristaldo was made his first appearance for Melbourne Victory in the 2013–14 season, coming on as a substitute for Brazilian Guilherme Finkler in the second half of a 3–0 home defeat to Brisbane Roar.

On 18 January 2014, Cristaldo was an unused substitute in a 5-0 away defeat against Wellington Phoenix.

On 15 April 2014, Cristaldo was included in Melbourne Victory's squad for a 2-0 home victory against China's Guangzhou Evergrande in the 2014 AFC Champions League, where he was an unused substitute.

=== Melbourne City ===
On 18 July 2015, Cristaldo was in Melbourne City's first-team squad for a friendly match against FA Premier League club Manchester City at the Cbus Super Stadium in Australia. Cristaldo was substituted onto the field for Harry Novillo in the 70th minute.

=== Hume City ===
In early 2014, Cristaldo joined Hume City FC in the National Premier Leagues Victoria, where he made 13 appearances, scoring one goal.

=== Werribee City ===
In 2015, Cristaldo joined Werribee City FC. In the first half of the season, he managed 3 goals in 11 appearances. He left the club mid year.

=== Melbourne City ===
In November 2015, Melbourne City FC Youth announced their squad for the upcoming National Youth League season, with Cristaldo included as one of the two 1995 born players, the other being Philip Petreski. He also played for their NPL side in the third tier of the Australian league system, finishing as the team's top scorer for the season.

=== Nacional Asunción ===
On 17 July 2016, it was announced by ABC Paraguay that Cristaldo joined Club Nacional Asunción for the second semester of the 2016 Paraguayan Primera División season.

Markos Gonzalez, Tigo Sports reporter in Paraguay, stated "Christopher Cristaldo Zambrini is the new player of Nacional and will be presented on Monday (for the day 18 of July)". According to the club president, Cristaldo would play in the club's reserve-team because the principal squad was complete. Paraguay's ABC news paper verified this whilst reporting Nacional's signing of Roberto Nanni, among other players.

Upon Cristaldo's signing, he converted in the club's 12th contracted player for the second semester of 2016. He eventually featured in the club's youth team as well, and departed the club in November after 4 months to join Melbourne club Port Melbourne Sharks.

=== Port Melbourne Sharks ===
==== 2016 ====
In November 2016, Cristaldo joined Victorian National Premier League club Port Melbourne Sharks. He had contacted the first-team coach, Dominic Barba, and both agreed terms. Cristaldo was one of seven players to join the club at the time of his arrival. The player arrived at the club having endured a stint of several months at Primera División Paraguaya club Nacional Asunción.

"I had a stint for about three, four months in Paraguay but things didn't work out but at the same time I'll take it as good experience. I learnt a lot of things overseas." – Cristaldo speaking about his time in Paraguayan football.

==== 2017 ====
On 17 February 2017, Cristaldo made his league debut for Port Melbourne Sharks in a 4–0 home thrashing of South Melbourne. Cristaldo scored his team's third goal in the 58th minute and was in the starting line up in the squad alongside former Super League Greece player Andreas Govas.

On 24 April 2017, Cristaldo scored his second goal for Port Melbourne Sharks in a 2–2 away draw against Kingston City.

His last appearances for Port Melbourne Sharks was on 28 May 2017 against South Melbourne in a 2–1 away loss.

Ultimately, Cristaldo departed the club after making 13 league appearances and scoring 2 goals.

=== St. Albans Saints ===
On 2 June 2017, St Albans Saints SC announced through Twitter than the club had signed Cristaldo. St. Albans Saints, being in last position of the league, signed the former Nacional of Paraguay and his other teammate, goal keeper Nikola Kostadinoski, both being transferred from Port Melbourne Sharks.

=== Moreland City ===
In 2018, Cristaldo, along with former A-League player Jesse Makarounas joined Moreland City FC for the 2018 season.

== International career ==
=== Australia youth ===
Cristaldo was selected for the Australia national under-17 soccer team and was pre-selected in 2011.

In 2013, he was involved in a tournament in Spain for the Australia national under-20 soccer team in which he participated and scored a goal against Saudi Arabia national under-20 football team.

=== Paraguay ===
In 2013, Paraguayan newspaper Ultima Hora published that Cristaldo's wish was to have an opportunity with Paraguay national under-20 football team for the 2013 FIFA U-20 World Cup in Turkey. Ultimately, Cristaldo was not selected in a squad which featured the likes of Antonio Sanabria, Derlis González and Brian Montenegro.

== Personal life ==
Cristaldo is the son of former footballer Victor Cristaldo, who played for Club Presidente Hayes and Club Sport Colombia in Paraguay, among other clubs in his career. Cristaldo was very young when he migrated with his family to Australia.

Cristaldo completed his secondary schooling education at Catholic Regional College in 2012 and then studied at the University of Footscray.
