= Darío Espínola (Paraguayan footballer) =

Paraguayan footballer (born 1967)

Personal information
- Full name: Darío René Espínola Sevian
- Date of birth: 14 September 1967
- Date of death: 7 March 2024 (aged 56)
- Position: Goalkeeper

Youth career
- 1984–1986: Sol de América

Senior career*
Years	Team	Apps	(Gls)
1987–1992	Sol de América	16	(0)
1991	→ Cerro Corá (loan)		
1992	River Plate Asunción		
1993–1994	Provincial Osorno	23	(0)
1995–1996	Tembetary	5	(0)
1996	Guaraní		
1997	Sportivo Luqueño		
1997	Everton	7	(0)
1998	Cerro Porteño	1	(0)
1999–2000	Oriente Petrolero		
2001	3 de Febrero		
2002–2003	Silvio Pettirossi	1	(0)
2004	Rubio Ñu		
2005–2006	Resistencia		

International career
1987	Paraguay U20		
1989	Paraguay		
- * Club domestic league appearances and goals

Darío René Espínola Sevian (Note: In this Spanish name, the first or paternal surname is Espínola and the second or maternal family name is Sevian.) (14 September 1967– 7 March 2024), known as Darío Espínola, was a Paraguayan footballer who played for clubs of Paraguay, Chile, and Bolivia.

== Teams ==
- (Paraguay) Sol de América 1987–1992
- (Paraguay) Cerro Corá 1991
- (Paraguay) River Plate Asunción 1992
- (Chile) Provincial Osorno 1993–1994
- (Paraguay) Tembetary 1995–1996
- (Paraguay) Guaraní 1996 Campeón Torneo Apertura
- (Paraguay) Sportivo Luqueño 1997
- (Chile) Everton 1997
- (Paraguay) Cerro Porteño 1998 Campeón Torneo Clausura
- (Bolivia) Oriente Petrolero 1999–2000
- (Paraguay) 3 de Febrero 2001
- (Paraguay) Silvio Pettirossi 2002–2003
- (Paraguay) Rubio Ñú 2004
- (Paraguay) Resistencia 2005–2006

== Post-retirement ==
Espínola became a goalkeeping coach working for clubs like Benjamín Aceval.
