= Jorge Daniel Florentín =

Paraguayan footballer (born 1982)

Personal information
- Full name: Jorge Daniel Florentín Cáceres
- Date of birth: 8 December 1982 (age 43)
- Place of birth: San Lorenzo, Paraguay
- Height: 1.80 m (5 ft 11 in)
- Position: Forward

Senior career*
Years	Team	Apps	(Gls)
2004	Sport Colombia	20	(4)
2005	12 de Octubre	9	(0)
2005–2007	Guaraní	2	(0)
2008	San Luis de Quillota	16	(0)
2009	La Paz FC	25	(9)
2010	Real Potosí	0	(0)
2011	La Paz FC	23	(6)
2012	Sportivo Carapeguá	7	(0)
2012	San Lorenzo	0	(0)
Total		102	(19)
- * Club domestic league appearances and goals

Jorge Daniel Florentín (born 8 December 1982) is a Paraguayan former footballer who played for Paraguayan sides Sport Colombia, 12 de Octubre, Guaraní, Sportivo Carapeguá and San Lorenzo, Bolivian sides La Paz and Real Potosí and Chilean side San Luis de Quillota.
