= Gustavo Mencia =

Paraguayan footballer (born 1988)

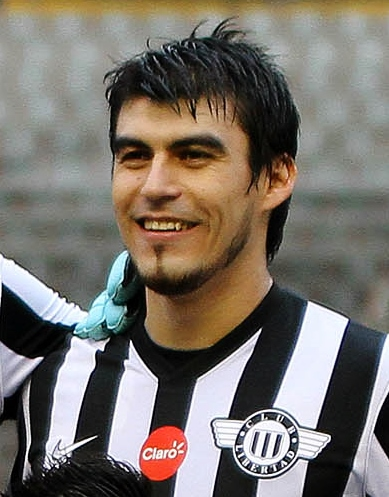
- Mencia with Libertad in 2015

Personal information
- Full name: Gustavo Ramón Mencia Ávalos
- Date of birth: 6 July 1988 (age 38)
- Place of birth: Presidente Franco, Paraguay
- Height: 1.79 m (5 ft 10 1/2 in)
- Position: Centre-back

Team information
- Current team: Rubio Ñu
- Number: 4

Youth career
- 2002–2006: Libertad

Senior career*
Years	Team	Apps	(Gls)
2006–2007	Libertad	4	(0)
2008	3 de Febrero	33	(4)
2009	Sportivo Luqueño	22	(2)
2010–2015	Libertad	188	(12)
2016	Olimpia	19	(0)
2017–2019	Universidad de Concepción	80	(1)
2020–2021	Deportes Antofagasta	22	(1)
2021–2022	Sol de América	38	(1)
2023	Sportivo Trinidense	4	(0)
2024–	Rubio Ñu	3	(1)

International career
2014–	Paraguay	3	(0)
- * Club domestic league appearances and goals as of 8 May 2024

Gustavo Ramón Mencia Ávalos (born 6 July 1988) is a Paraguayan footballer who plays as a centre-back for Rubio Ñu in the Paraguayan División Intermedia.

== Club career ==
Mencia was born in Presidente Franco, Paraguay. He started his career with Libertad. Subsequently, he played for 3 de Febrero, Sportivo Luqueño and Olimpia.

From 2017 to 2021, he played in Chile for Universidad de Concepción (2017–2019) and Deportes Antofagasta (2020–2021) in the top division.

Back in Paraguay, he played for Sol de América and Sportivo Trinidense.

In 2024, he joined Rubio Ñu in the Paraguayan second level.

== International career ==
On 14 November 2012, Mencia made his debut for the Paraguay national football team and also scored his first goal in a friendly match against Guatemala.
