= César Llamas =

Paraguayan footballer (born 1985)

Personal information
- Date of birth: 13 July 1985 (age 41)
- Place of birth: Ciudad del Este, Paraguay
- Position: Midfielder

Team information
- Current team: 3 de Febrero

Senior career*
Years	Team	Apps	(Gls)
2008–	3 de Febrero	168	(16)
2012	→ Rubio Ñu (loan)	16	(2)

International career^{‡}
2012	Paraguay	1	(0)
- * Club domestic league appearances and goals as of 09:01, 14 March 2021 (UTC) ‡ National team caps and goals as of 09:01, 14 March 2021 (UTC)

César Llamas (born 13 July 1985) is a Paraguayan international footballer who plays as a midfielder for 3 de Febrero in the División Intermedia.

== Club career ==
Born in Ciudad del Este, Llamas began his career at 3 de Febrero.

in 2012 Llamas and teammate Gilberto Velázquez joined Rubio Ñu on loan. It was whilst Llamas was at Rubio Ñu that he received a call up to the national team. Llamas concluded his loan stint at Rubio Ñu scoring 2 goals in 16 Primera Division games.

== International career ==
In 2012, Llamas received a call up to the Paraguay national team whilst on loan at Rubio Ñu. On 15 February, Llamas was in Paraguay's starting line up for a friendly against Chile in Luque. He was replaced in the 69th minute by Ariel Bogado as Paraguay defeated Chile 2-0.
