= Victor Cristaldo =

Soccer player (born 1967)

Personal information
- Date of birth: 10 May 1967 (age 59)
- Place of birth: Argentina
- Position: Midfielder

Youth career
- 1984: Leicester City

Senior career*
Years	Team	Apps	(Gls)
1983–1984	Keilor		
1984	Leicester City	0	(0)
1985–1987	Melbourne Croatia	24	(0)
1988–1992	Thomastown	139	(17)
1993–1996	Presidente Hayes		
1996	Western Suburbs		(2)
1996–1997	Sport Colombia		
1998	Western Suburbs		(1)
2002–2005	Melbourne City		

International career
- Australia U20
- * Club domestic league appearances and goals

Victor Cristaldo (born 10 May 1967) is a former professional soccer player who played as a midfielder and works as a coach.

In 1985 and 1986, Cristaldo played for Melbourne Knights in the National Soccer League. He then passed five seasons in the Primera División Paraguaya from 1993 to 1997. In this task, he featured for Club Presidente Hayes and Club Sport Colombia, becoming the first Australian to play in Paraguay and the second player to play in South America after John Crawley (1990 in Chile). Born in Argentina, he represented the Australia under-20 national team internationally.

Following his retirement, Cristaldo became a coach.

He is the father of Australian footballer Christopher Cristaldo.

== Early life ==
Cristaldo was born in Argentina to Paraguayan parents and moved to Australia at the age of 9. He attended Flemington High School.

== Club career ==
=== Leicester City ===
In 1984, Cristaldo played for Leicester City for three months, scoring 12 goals in 15 games for the club's reserve and youth teams.

=== Melbourne Knights ===
Cristaldo started his career with Melbourne club Keilor Park and later joined Melbourne Knights in Australia's National Soccer League in 1985, being a member of the squad for the 1985 and 1986 seasons. In 1986, whilst playing for Melbourne Knights, he was called up to the Argentine Air Force.

=== Thomastown ===
In 1988, Cristaldo played for Thomastown, where he remained until 1992.

=== Presidente Hayes ===
In 1993, Cristaldo joined Primera División Paraguaya club Presidente Hayes in the city of Asunción. he told Australian newspaper The Age "It's like a dream come true. But financially, it's just not possible". His wages in Paraguay were more than three times higher than they were in Australia and the cost of living in Paraguay was much lower. He and his wife, Cynthia, bought a house and the club supplied them with a car. At Presidente Hayes, Cristaldo was teammates with national team players Edgar Denis and Justo Jacquet. He hoped that during the Paraguayan off-season that an Australian National Soccer League club would, at the very least, give him a guest stint.

=== Western Suburbs ===
Cristaldo played for Western Suburbs in the Victorian State League Division 1 in 1996, scoring two goals.

=== Sport Colombia ===
In 1996, Cristaldo passed to Club Sport Colombia for the 1996 Primera División season, as Sport Colombia finished fourth in the Torneo Clausura. He remained there until 1997, which was when future national team player Nelson Cuevas debuted for the club.

=== Western Suburbs ===
He returned to Western Suburbs in 1998.

== International career ==
Cristaldo represented the Australia U-20 national team. In 1993, Cristaldo hoped that his success in Paraguay would prompt Australia's national team coach, Eddie Thomson, to consider adding him to the squad.

== Managerial career ==
Cristaldo moved into coaching after retiring as a player. He has had roles at a number of clubs including Monash City and Sunshine George Cross.

== Personal life ==
Cristaldo is the father of Paraguayan-born Australian footballer Christopher who appeared for the Australia U-20 national team, Melbourne Victory in the A-League and Nacional Asunción in the Primera División Paraguaya.

== See also ==
- List of expatriate footballers in Paraguay
- Players and Records in Paraguayan Football
