= Estadio Alfonso Colmán =

Stadium in Fernando de la Mora, Paraguay

- Interactive map of Estadio Alfonso Colmán
- Full name: Estadio Alfonso Colmán
- Location: Fernando de la Mora, Paraguay
- Coordinates: 25.317505°S 57.554661°W
- Owner: Club Sport Colombia
- Operator: Club Sport Colombia
- Capacity: 7,000

Tenant
- Club Sport Colombia

Estadio Alfonso Colmán is a multi-use stadium in Fernando de la Mora, Paraguay. It is currently used mostly for football matches and is the home stadium of Club Sport Colombia of the Primera División de Paraguay. The stadium holds 7,000 spectators
