= Jara (Asunción) =

Coordinates: 25°17′S 57°36′W

- Barrio
- Interactive map of Jara
- Country: Paraguay
- Autonomous Capital District: Gran Asunción
- City: Asunción
- Time zone: 1:35

Jara is a neighbourhood (barrio) of Asunción, Paraguay. It is named after the 19th century vice president Juan Antonio Jara, who owned most of the land that comprises it.

In 2021, the World Futsal Association announced that it would open its global headquarters in Jara.
