= 2010 in Paraguayan football =

The 2010 season is the 100th season of competitive football in Paraguay.

== Transfers ==
- List of transfers during the 2010 season registered under the Asociación Paraguaya de Fútbol.

== National team ==
=== Men's national team ===
31 March 2010 International Friendly	Paraguay	1 – 1	South Africa	Asunción, Paraguay
18:00 UTC-3	Estigarribia 37'	Report	Tshabalala 71'	Stadium: Estadio Defensores del Chaco; Attendance: 15,000

15 May 2010 International Friendly	Paraguay	1 – 0	North Korea	Nyon, Switzerland
18:00 UTC-2	Santa Cruz 86' (pen.)	Report		Stadium: Centre sportif de Colovray Nyon

25 May 2010 International Friendly	Republic of Ireland	2 – 1	Paraguay	Dublin, Ireland
19:45 UTC+1	Kevin Doyle 7'; Liam Lawrence 39'	Report	Lucas Barrios 58'	Stadium: RDS Arena; Attendance: 16,722

30 May 2010 International Friendly	Paraguay	2 – 2	Ivory Coast	Thonon-les-Bains, France
18:00 UTC+2	Barrios 74'; Torres 90'	Report	Drogba 52'; Bamba 73'	Stadium: Stade Joseph-Moynat

2 June 2010 International Friendly	Greece	0 – 2	Paraguay	Winterthur, Switzerland
18:30 UTC+2		Report	Vera 9'; Barrios 24'	Stadium: Stadion Schützenwiese

14 June 2010 2010 FIFA World Cup	Italy	1 – 1	Paraguay	Cape Town, South Africa
18:00 UTC+2	De Rossi 63'	Report	Alcaraz 39'	Stadium: Cape Town Stadium; Attendance: 62,869; Referee: Benito Archundia (Mexico)

20 June 2010 2010 FIFA World Cup	Slovakia	0 – 2	Paraguay	Bloemfontein, South Africa
13:30 UTC+2		Report	Vera 27'; Riveros 86'	Stadium: Free State Stadium; Attendance: 26,643; Referee: Eddy Maillet (Seychelles)

24 June 2010 2010 FIFA World Cup	Paraguay	0 – 0	New Zealand	Polokwane, South Africa
16:00 UTC+2		Report		Stadium: Peter Mokaba Stadium; Attendance: 34,850; Referee: Yuichi Nishimura (Japan)

29 June 2010 2010 FIFA World Cup	Paraguay	0 – 0 (a.e.t.) (5 – 3 p)	Japan	Pretoria, South Africa
16:00 UTC+2		Report		Stadium: Loftus Versfeld Stadium; Attendance: 36,742; Referee: Frank De Bleeckere (Belgium)
	Penalties
	Barreto (penalty scored); Barrios (penalty scored); Riveros (penalty scored); Valdez (penalty scored); Cardozo (penalty scored)		(penalty scored) Endō; (penalty scored) Hasebe; (penalty missed) Komano; (penalty scored) Honda

3 July 2010 2010 FIFA World Cup	Paraguay	0 – 1	Spain	Johannesburg, South Africa
20:30 UTC+2		Report	Villa 83'	Stadium: Ellis Park Stadium; Attendance: 55,359; Referee: Carlos Batres (Guatemala)

11 August 2010 International Friendly	Paraguay	2 – 0	Costa Rica	Asunción, Paraguay
20:00 UTC-4	Vera 7'; Riveros 73'			Stadium: Estadio Defensores del Chaco; Attendance: 25,000

4 September 2010 International Friendly	Japan	1 – 0	Paraguay	Yokohama, Japan
19:20 UTC+9	Kagawa 64'			Stadium: International Stadium Yokohama; Attendance: 65,157

7 September 2010 International Friendly	China	1 – 1	Paraguay	Nanjing, China
19:35 UTC+8	Gao Lin 33'		Barrios 8'	Stadium: Nanjing Olympic Sports Center

9 October 2010 International Friendly	Australia	1 – 0	Paraguay	Sydney, Australia
20:00 UTC+10	Carney 53'			Stadium: Sydney Football Stadium

12 October 2010 International Friendly	New Zealand	0 – 2	Paraguay	Wellington, New Zealand
19:30 UTC+13			Valdez 22' (pen.); Martínez 27'	Stadium: Westpac Stadium; Attendance: 16,477; Referee: Jamie Cross

17 November 2010 International Friendly	Hong Kong	0 – 7	Paraguay	Hong Kong
20:00 UTC+8			Santa Cruz 4', 32'; Barreto 30'; Ortigoza 47', 55'; M.Riveros 75'; C.Riveros 90'	Stadium: Hong Kong Stadium; Attendance: 6,250

=== Women's national team ===
November 5, 2010 2010 Sudamericano Femenino	Paraguay	0–3	Colombia	Loja, Ecuador
17:00 UTC-5		Report	Domínguez 18'; Uzme 46'; Rincón 70'	Stadium: Estadio Federativo Reina del Cisne

November 7, 2010 2010 Sudamericano Femenino	Venezuela	0–4	Paraguay	Loja, Ecuador
11:00 UTC-5		Report	Quintana 49'; Villamayor 56', 59', 80'	Stadium: Estadio Federativo Reina del Cisne

November 9, 2010 2010 Sudamericano Femenino	Paraguay	4–0	Uruguay	Azogues, Ecuador
16:00 UTC-5	Villamayor 29'; Galeano 38'; Quintana 42'; Vásquez 89' (pen.)	Report		Stadium: Estadio Jorge Andrade

November 13, 2010 2010 Sudamericano Femenino	Brazil	3–0	Paraguay	Cuenca, Ecuador
16:00 UTC-5	Cristiane 18', 36'; Marta 57'	Report		Stadium: Estadio Alejandro Serrano Aguilar
