= Cristian Riveros =

Paraguayan footballer (born 1982)

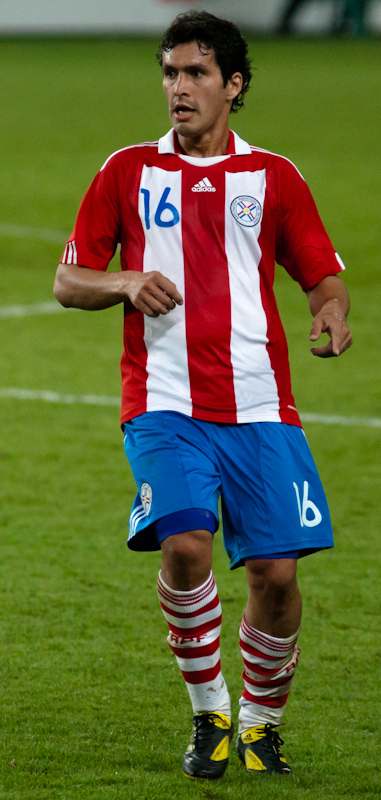

Personal information
- Full name: Cristian Miguel Riveros Núñez
- Date of birth: 16 October 1982 (age 44)
- Place of birth: Julián Augusto Saldívar, Paraguay
- Height: 1.79 m (5 ft 10 1/2 in)
- Position: Defensive midfielder

Senior career*
Years	Team	Apps	(Gls)
1999	Cristóbal Colón		
2000–2005	Tacuary	108	(16)
2002	→ Sportivo San Lorenzo (loan)	24	(0)
2005–2007	Libertad	50	(8)
2007–2010	Cruz Azul	111	(17)
2010–2012	Sunderland	12	(1)
2011–2012	→ Kayserispor (loan)	33	(2)
2012–2013	Kayserispor	30	(0)
2013–2015	Grêmio	43	(5)
2015–2018	Olimpia Asunción	107	(11)
2018–2019	Libertad	53	(1)
2020–2022	Nacional Asunción	59	(4)
2022–2024	Libertad	34	(4)
Total		664	(69)

International career
2005–2018	Paraguay	101	(16)
Medal record
Representing Paraguay
Copa América
Runner-up	2011 Argentina	Team
- * Club domestic league appearances and goals

Cristian Miguel Riveros Núñez (born 16 October 1982) is a Paraguayan former professional footballer who played as a defensive midfielder.

A full international for Paraguay since 2005, he has earned 99 caps for his country, playing at two FIFA World Cup competitions (2006 and 2010) and three Copa América tournaments (2007, 2011 and 2015).

On 19 July 2015, Paraguayan newspaper ExtraPRESS named Riveros the most expensive player in Paraguay.

== Club career ==
=== Early career ===
Riveros started his career with local side Cristobal Colón in his hometown of Juan Augusto Saldivar and then moved to other Paraguayan teams such as San Lorenzo and Tacuary before playing for Libertad.

=== Cruz Azul ===
On 12 July 2007 he signed for the Mexican club Cruz Azul.

=== Sunderland ===
On 11 May 2010, Riveros signed for Sunderland of the English Premier League on a three-year deal, saying "The league is very competitive and I look forward to being very successful with Sunderland. The Premier League is the best league in the world and Sunderland are a very big club with many passionate supporters. I look forward to meeting them."

He made his Premier League debut on 14 August 2010 as a 63rd-minute substitute for Steed Malbranque in a 2–2 draw against Birmingham City in the opening game of the season. However, Riveros quickly fell out of favour and played just 14 league games for, the club, scoring his only goal on the final day of the season in a 3–0 win over West Ham United.

=== Kayserispor ===
Riveros joined Turkish Süper Lig side Kayserispor on 6 July 2011 on a season-long loan from Sunderland, and signed a permanent contract on 1 May 2012.

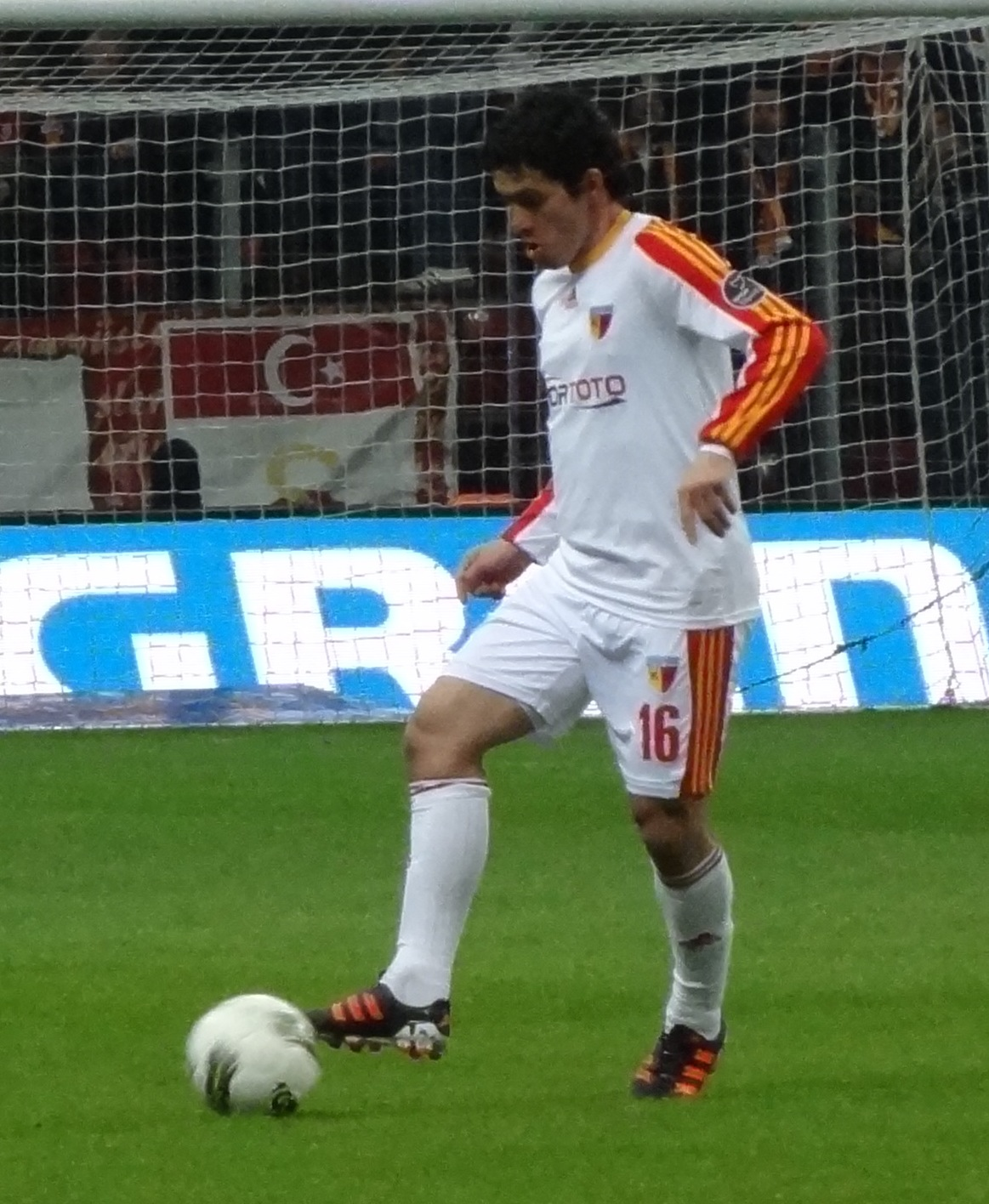
Riveros with Keyserispor.

=== Grêmio ===
On 7 June 2013, Riveros joined Grêmio, signing a two-year contract.

=== Olimpia Asunción ===
In January 2015 after long and exhausting negotiations, it was announced that Grêmio and Club Olimpia Asunción had reached an agreement to sign Riveros for the 2015 Paraguayan Primera División season. Riveros was Instrumental for Olimpia to win their 40th Local Championship, for his experience and skills and also for his leadership on and off the pitch.

=== Libertad ===
On 7 December 2017, sports news outlet D10 Paraguay announced that Riveros would sign a two-year contract with Libertad, returning to the club after 11 years.

=== Nacional Asunción ===
He joined Nacional Asunción for the 2020 season.

=== Libertad ===
On 18 January 2022 of Paraguay's summer transfer window, Riveros officially completed a transfer to Libertad. Anterior to this, Riveros already performed the 2022 pre-season training with Nacional Asunción, however, he joined Libertad for the third time in his career, being at the request of Argentine coach Daniel Garnero. By this way, he was one of three FIFA World Cup players in Libertad's team, being with Oscar Cardozo and Roque Santa Cruz.

== International career ==
Riveros played in Paraguay's first two matches at the 2006 World Cup and played efficiently on the left wing. He picked up his first international goal for Paraguay in a 3–2 defeat to Chile. He also played for Paraguay in the Copa América 2007.

=== 2010 FIFA World Cup ===
On 4 May 2010, he was named in Paraguay's preliminary 30-man squad for the 2010 FIFA World Cup, and also made the 23-man penultimate selection alongside club team-mate da Silva.

On 20 June 2010 at the World Cup, Riveros scored a second goal in a 2–0 win over Slovakia, which was set up by former Sunderland defender Paulo Da Silva. Riveros scored a penalty in Paraguay's shoot-out win against Japan in the Round of 16 stage, after the match finished goalless after extra time.

== Career statistics ==
=== Club ===
As of 3 December 2023

Club	Season	League			National cup		League cup		Continental		Other		Total	
Club	Season	Division	Apps	Goals	Apps	Goals	Apps	Goals	Apps	Goals	Apps	Goals	Apps	Goals
San Lorenzo	2002	Primera Division	14	0									14	0
Tacuary	2003	Primera Division	29	1									29	1
Tacuary	2004	Primera Division	30	3									30	3
Tacuary	2005	Primera Division	18	3					2	0			20	3
Tacuary	Total		77	7					2	0			79	7
Libertad	2005	Primera Division	17	4									17	4
Libertad	2006	Primera Division	24	4					15	2			39	6
Libertad	2007	Primera Division							7	1			7	1
Libertad	Total		41	8					22	3			63	11
Cruz Azul	2007-08	Liga MX	38	6	0	0	0	0	0	0	0	0	38	6
Cruz Azul	2008-09	Liga MX	37	5	0	0	0	0	8	2	0	0	45	7
Cruz Azul	2009-10	Liga MX	36	6	0	0	0	0	12	3	0	0	48	9
Cruz Azul	Total		111	17	0	0	0	0	20	5	0	0	131	22
Sunderland	2010-11	Premier League	12	1	1	0	1	0	0	0	0	0	14	1
Sunderland	Total		12	1	1	0	1	0	0	0	0	0	14	1
Kayserispor (loan)	2011-12	Süper Lig	33	2	3	0	0	0	0	0	4	1	40	3
Kayserispor (loan)	Total		33	2	3	0	0	0	0	0	4	1	40	3
Kayserispor	2012-13	Süper Lig	30	0	1	0	0	0	0	0	0	0	31	0
Kayserispor	Total		30	0	1	0	0	0	0	0	0	0	31	0
Grêmio	2013	Série A	20	3	6	0	0	0	0	0	0	0	26	3
Grêmio	2014	Série A	23	2	0	0	0	0	8	1	12	0	43	3
Grêmio	Total		43	5	6	0	0	0	8	1	12	0	69	6
Olimpia	2015	Primera Division	40	5					6	0			46	5
Olimpia	2016	Primera Division	42	3					5	2			47	5
Olimpia	2017	Primera Division	25	3					6	0			31	3
Olimpia	Total		107	11					17	2			124	13
Libertad	2018	Primera Division	27	0					7	0			34	0
Libertad	2019	Primera Division	26	1					9	0			35	1
Libertad	2022	Primera Division	17	3					4	1			21	4
Libertad	2023	Primera Division	17	1	1	0			3	0			21	1
Libertad	Total		87	5	1	0			23	1			111	6
Nacional	2020	Primera Division	25	2					2	0			27	2
Nacional	2021	Primera Division	34	2					1	0			35	2
Nacional	Total		59	4					3	0			62	4
Career total			614	60	12	0	1	0	95	12	16	1	738	73

=== International ===
As of 27 March 2018

Paraguay
Year	Apps	Goals
2005	5	0
2006	8	1
2007	14	4
2008	7	2
2009	11	1
2010	13	3
2011	17	3
2012	7	1
2013	5	0
2014	3	0
2015	0	0
2016	5	1
2017	5	0
2018	1	0
Total	101	16

=== International goals ===
Scores and results list Paraguay's goal tally first.

#	Date	Venue	Opponent	Score	Result	Competition
1.	15 November 2006	Estadio Sausalito, Viña del Mar, Chile	Chile	?	3–2	Friendly
2.	9 September 2007	Estadio José Pachencho Romero, Maracaibo, Venezuela	Venezuela	1–0	2–3	Friendly
3.	9 September 2007	Estadio José Pachencho Romero, Maracaibo, Venezuela	Venezuela	2–0	2–3	Friendly
4.	17 November 2007	Estadio Defensores del Chaco, Asunción, Paraguay	Ecuador	2–0	5–1	2010 FIFA World Cup qualification
5.	17 November 2007	Estadio Defensores del Chaco, Asunción, Paraguay	Ecuador	5–1	5–1	2010 FIFA World Cup qualification
6.	20 August 2008	Centre sportif de Colovray Nyon, Nyon, Switzerland	Saudi Arabia	1–0	1–1	Friendly
7.	9 September 2008	Estadio Defensores del Chaco, Asunción, Paraguay	Venezuela	1–0	2–0	2010 FIFA World Cup qualification
8.	11 February 2009	Estadio Alejandro Villanueva, Lima, Peru	Peru	1–0	1–0	Friendly
9.	20 June 2010	Free State Stadium, Bloemfontein, South Africa	Slovakia	2–0	2–0	2010 FIFA World Cup
10.	11 August 2010	Estadio Defensores del Chaco, Asunción, Paraguay	Costa Rica	2–0	2–0	Friendly
11.	17 November 2010	Hong Kong Stadium, So Kon Po, Hong Kong	Hong Kong	7–0	7–0	Friendly
12.	26 March 2011	Oakland–Alameda County Coliseum, Oakland, United States	Mexico	1–3	1–3	Friendly
13.	13 July 2011	Estadio Padre Ernesto Martearena, Salta, Argentina	Venezuela	3–1	3–3	2011 Copa América
14.	11 November 2011	Estadio Defensores del Chaco, Asunción, Paraguay	Ecuador	1–0	2–1	2014 FIFA World Cup qualification
15.	9 June 2012	Estadio Hernando Siles La Paz, Bolivia	Bolivia	1–3	1–3	2014 FIFA World Cup qualification
16.	10 November 2016	Estadio Defensores del Chaco, Asunción, Paraguay	Peru	1–0	1–4	2018 FIFA World Cup qualification

== Honours ==
=== Club ===
Libertad

- Paraguayan Primera División: 2006, 2007

== See also ==
- List of men's footballers with 100 or more international caps
