= Club Sport Colombia =

Paraguayan football club

Sport Colombia
- Full name: Club Sport Colombia
- Nickname: Los Cafeteros
- Founded: November 1, 1924; 102 years ago
- Ground: Estadio Alfonso Colmán
- Capacity: 7,000
- Owner: Eduardo Pimentel
- Chairman: Hugo Galeano
- Manager: Humberto García
- League: Primera C
- 2023: 2nd (Promoted to Primera B)
Home colours	Away colours

Club Sport Colombia, is a Paraguayan football club based in the city of Fernando de la Mora.

== History ==
The club was founded November 1, 1924 and plays in the Paraguayan third division. Their home games are played at the Estadio Alfonso Colmán which has a capacity of approximately 7,000 seats. The club is the former home of Jorge Daniel Florentín, Elio Mora, Ignacio Paniagua, Emilio Martinez, José Antonio Franco, Pedro Richard Irala, Carlos Antonio Mereles, Rodolfo Guillén, Marcelo Estigarribia and Victor Cristaldo.

== Honours ==
- Paraguayan Second Division: 6

1940, 1944, 1945, 1950, 1985, 1992

- Paraguayan Third Division: 3

1944, 1969, 2007

== Notable players ==
To appear in this section a player must have either:

- Played at least 125 games for the club.
- Set a club record or won an individual award while at the club.
- Been part of a national team at any time.
- Played in the first division of any other football association (outside of Paraguay).
- Played in a continental and/or intercontinental competition.

1990s

- (Paraguay) Daniel Sanabria (1995–97)
- (Paraguay) Nelson Cuevas (1997)
- (Paraguay) Paulo da Silva (1997)

2000s

- (Paraguay) Carlos Antonio Mereles (2002–04)
- (Paraguay) Pedro Richard Irala (2003–04)
- (Paraguay) Ignacio Paniagua (2004)
- (Paraguay) Jorge Daniel Florentín (2004)
- (Chile) Elias Rodriguez (2005)
- (Paraguay) Marcelo Estigarribia (2005–06)
- (Paraguay) Elio Mora (2009–10)

2010s

- (Paraguay) Rodolfo Guillén (2010)
- (Paraguay) Emilio Martínez (2011–)
- (Paraguay) José Antonio Franco (2012–)
- (Paraguay) Osvaldo Mendoza (2012)

Non-CONMEBOL players

- (Australia) Victor Cristaldo (1996–1997)
