= Club Atlético 3 de Febrero =

Paraguayan football club

3 de Febrero
- Full name: Club Atlético 3 de Febrero
- Nickname: Los Rojos
- Founded: 20 November 1970; 55 years ago
- Ground: Estadio Antonio Aranda
- Capacity: 28,000
- Chairman: Antonio Aranda
- Manager: Mauro Caballero
- League: Primera B Nacional
- 2024: División Intermedia, 14th of 16 (relegated by average)
| Home colours | Away colours |

Club Atlético 3 de Febrero, also known as Atlético 3 de Febrero or simply 3 de Febrero, is a professional Paraguayan football club from Ciudad del Este, the capital city of the department of Alto Paraná. The club was founded in 1970, and named after St. Blaise Day (February 3), a national holiday throughout many Hispanic countries. Atlético 3 de Febrero have played 9 seasons in the Primera División. At present plays in Primera B Nacional, one of the third division leagues in the Paraguayan football league system.

== History ==
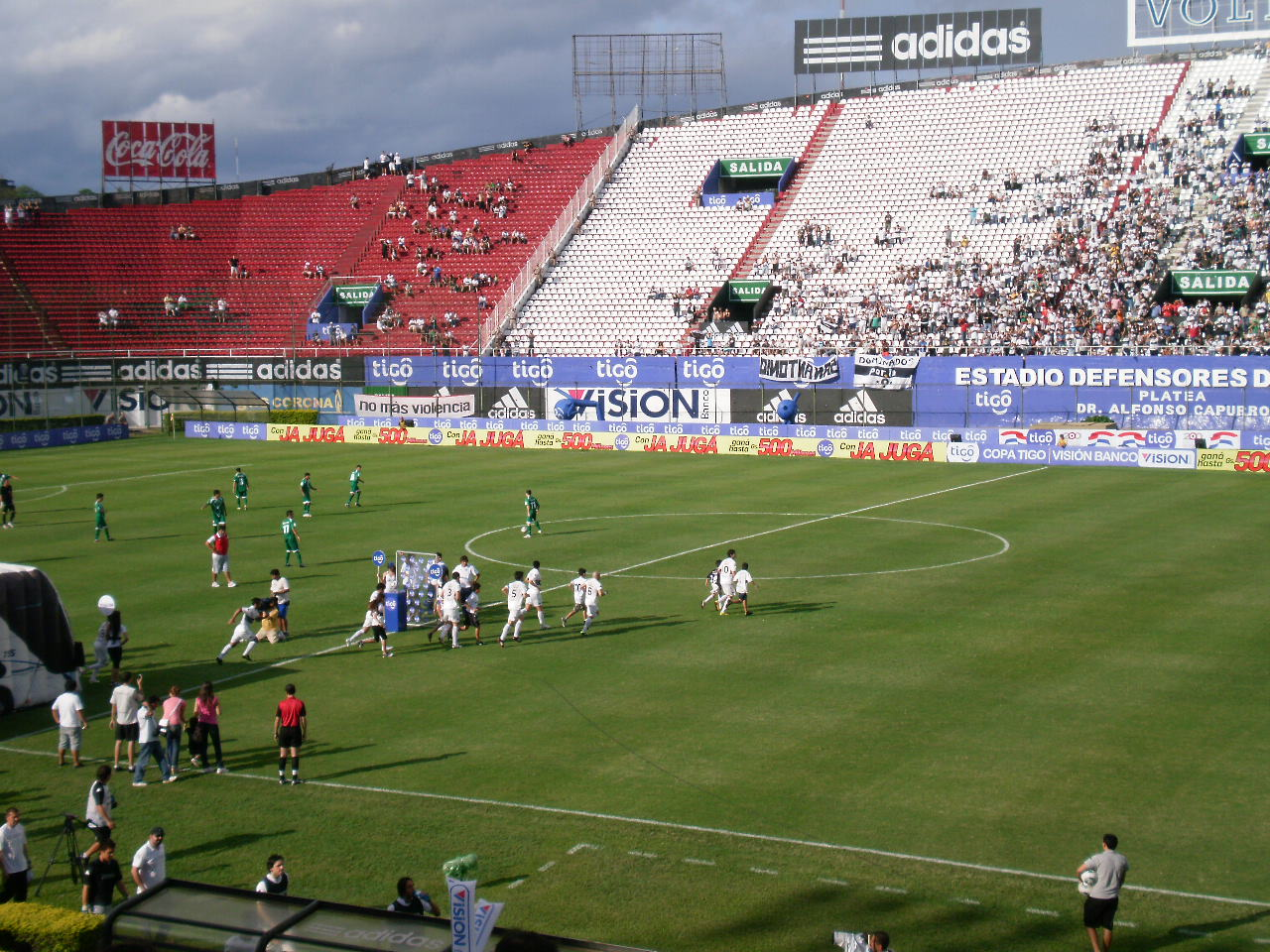
3 de Febrero in a fixture against Olimpia Asunción at the Defensores del Chaco in 2011

The team started playing in the Liga Paranaense and finally made their way to the second division of the Paraguayan League in 2000.

In 2004 the club won the second division title and got promoted to the first division.

In 2011, the club was relegated to the Paraguayan 2nd division, but won the title again in 2013, once again being promoted to the first division.

== Stadium ==
3 de Febrero's stadium is the Estadio Antonio Aranda, also known as Estadio 3 de Febrero. It is located next to Ciudad del Este's bus terminal. The stadium is on the Avenue General Bernardino Caballero, and was opened in 1973. The capacity of the stadium, is 28,000. It has a grass surface and was renovated in 1999, for which it was utilized as one of the venues of the 1999 Copa América. Fixtures of the 2004 South American U-16 Championship and the 2007 South American U-20 Championship were also disputed at the stadium. The stadium is Paraguay's third largest, according to its seating capacity. The stadium was the venue which saw Paraguayan footballers Roque Santa Cruz score his first international goal for the Albirroja on 17 June 1999 in a friendly match against Uruguay and Nelson Haedo score his first international goal for the Albirroja on 17 August 2005 in a friendly match against El Salvador.

=== Gallery ===
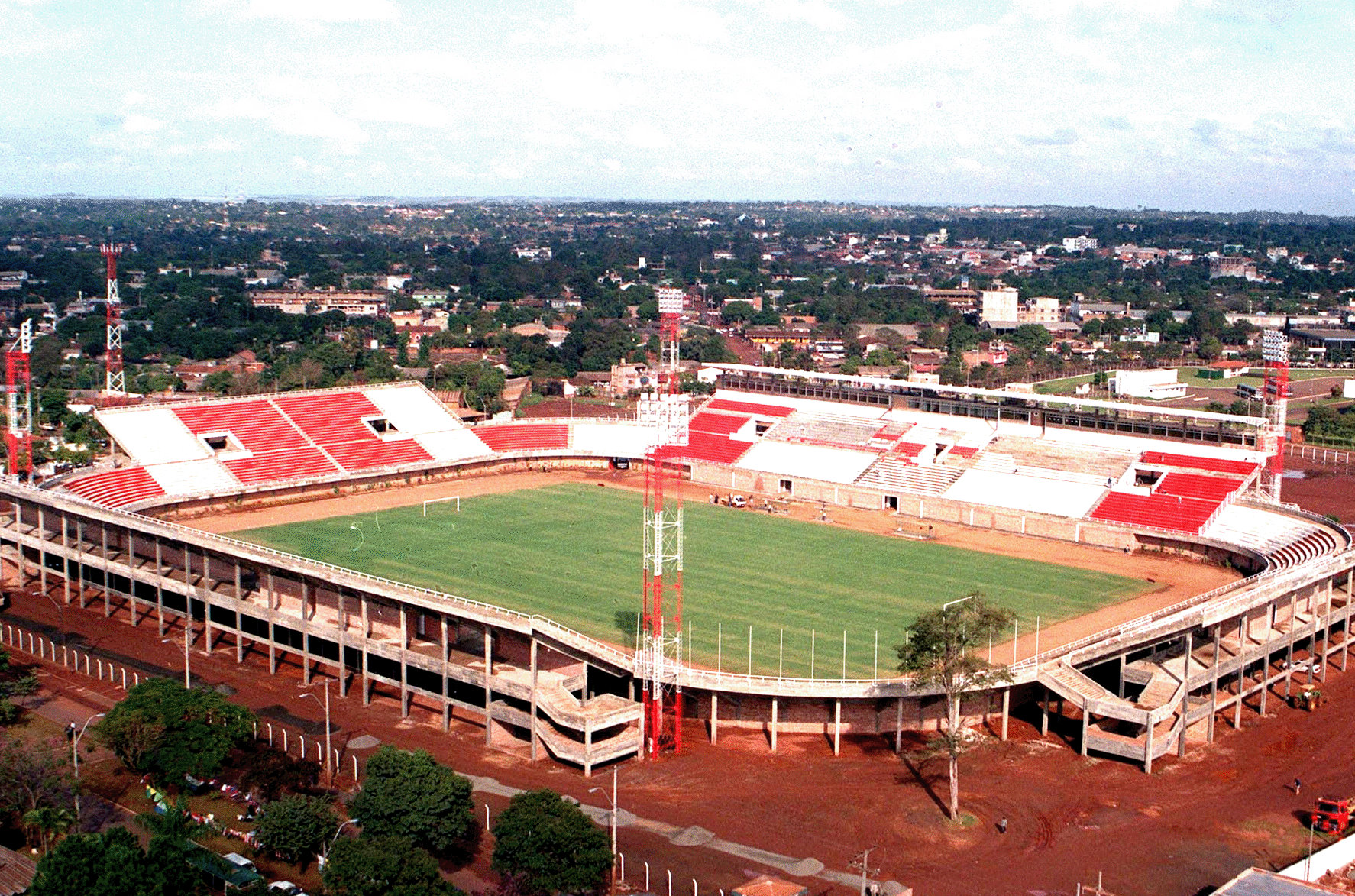
Fachada principal del remodelado estadio rojo

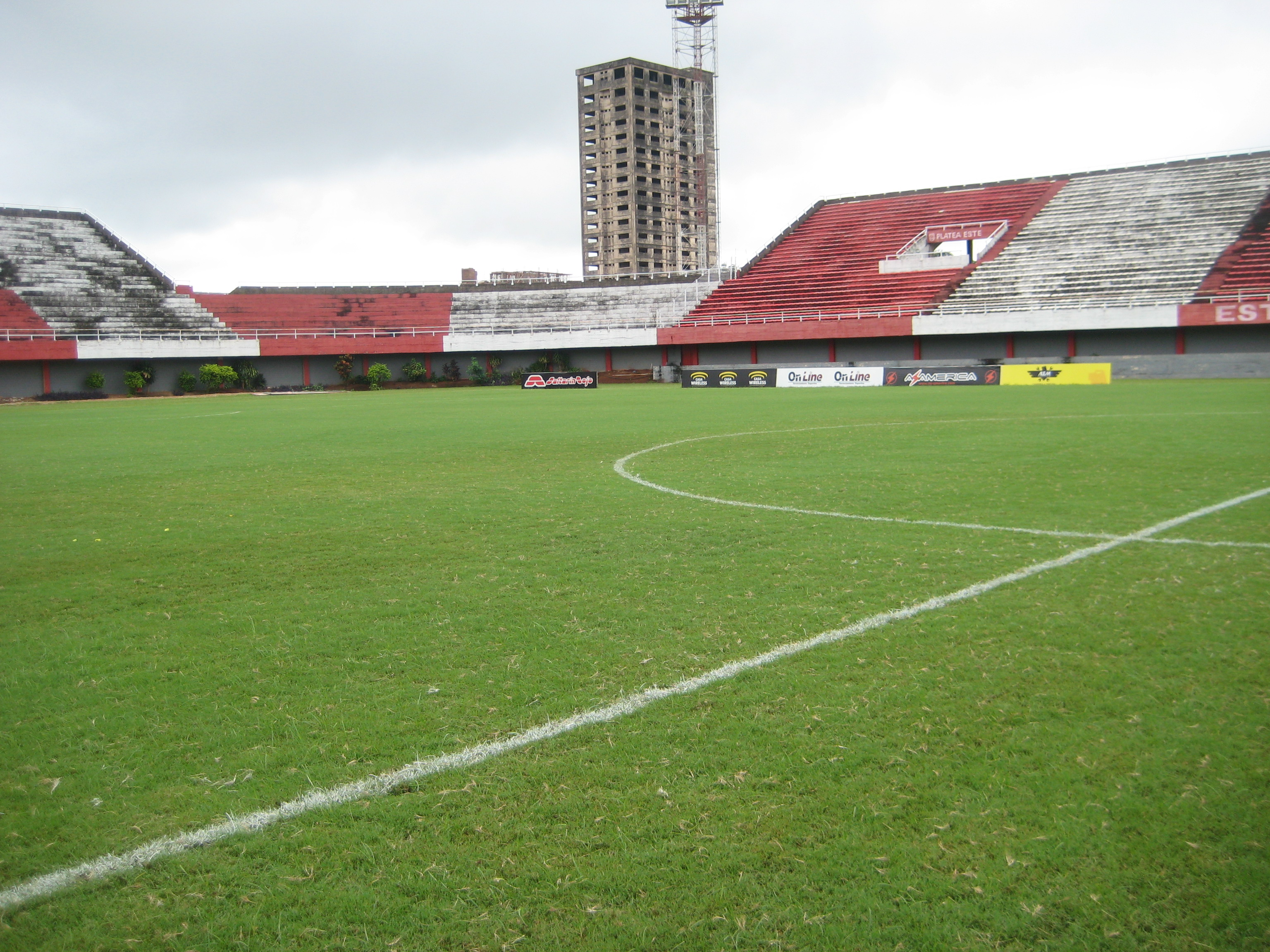
Interior del Estadio Antonio Oddone Sarubbi del Club Atlético 3 de Febrero in 2017

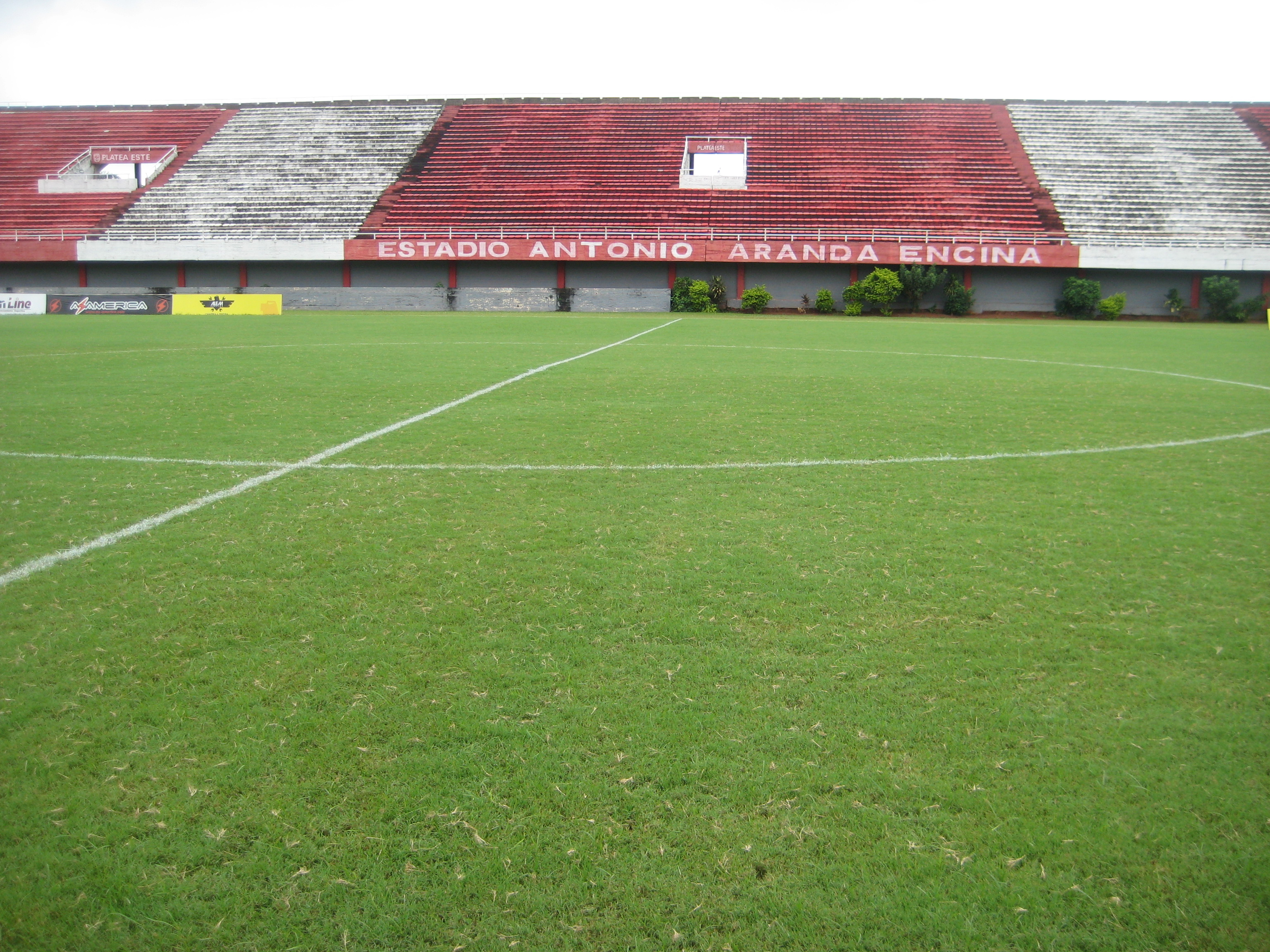
Interior del Estadio Antonio Oddone Sarubbi del Club Atlético 3 de Febrero in 2017

== Honours ==
- División Intermedia: 2

2004, 2013

- Primera División B Nacional: 1

2000

- Regional Titles (Alto Paraná League): 6

1973, 1975, 1977, 1986, 1992, 1997

== Notable players ==
To appear in this section a player must either have:

- Played at least 125 games for the club.
- Set a club record or won an individual award while at the club.
- Been part of a national team at any time.
- Played in the first division of any other football association (outside of Paraguay).
- Played in a continental or intercontinental competition.

1990s

- (Paraguay) Justo Jacquet (1994)

2000s

- (Paraguay) Ignacio Paniagua (2000–2001)
- (Paraguay) Celso Guerrero (2001)
- (Paraguay) Darío Espínola (2001)
- (Paraguay) Óscar Cardozo (2003–2004)
- (Paraguay) Angel Antar (2003)
- (Paraguay) Juan Cardozo (2004–2005)
- (Paraguay) Juan Ramón Jara (2005)
- (Paraguay) Osvaldo Mendoza (2005)
- (Paraguay) Edgar Robles (2005)
- (Paraguay) Milton Benítez (2006, 2008–2010)
- (Paraguay) Fidencio Oviedo (2006)
- (Paraguay) Blas López (2006)
- (Paraguay) Miguel Cárdenas (2006)
- (Paraguay) Pablo Caballero (2006)
- (Paraguay) Jorge Valdez (2007)
- (Paraguay) Eric Ramos (2007)
- (Paraguay) Richard Salinas (2007)
- (Paraguay) Rodrigo Romero (2008)
- (Paraguay) José Antonio Franco (2008)
- (Paraguay) Gustavo Mencia (2008)
- (Paraguay) Felipe Villalba (2008–2012)
- (Paraguay) Troadio Duarte (2008, 2009)
- (Paraguay) César Llamas (2008–2011, 2013–)
- (Brazil) Rafael Baiano (2009, 2010–2011)

2010s

- (Paraguay) Miguel Ángel Cuéllar (2010)
- (Paraguay) Henry Lapczyk (2010)
- (Paraguay) Hugo Santacruz (2010, 2014)
- (Paraguay) Carlos Antonio Mereles (2011)
- (Paraguay) Osvaldo Moreno (2011)
- (Paraguay) Delio Toledo (2011)
- (Paraguay) Gilberto Velásquez (2011)
- (Paraguay) Derlis Cardozo (2011–2013)
- (Paraguay) Joel Zayas (2011–2012)
- (Brazil) Diego Balbinot (2012–2014)
- (Paraguay) Derlis Gómez (2012)
- (Paraguay) Jorge Salinas (2014)
- (Paraguay) Antony Silva (2014)
- (Paraguay) Julio Aguilar (2014)
- (Paraguay) Rodrigo Burgos (2014)
- (Paraguay) Ricardo Mazacotte (2014)
- (Uruguay) Leonardo Migliónico (2014–)
- (Argentina) Hugo Iriarte (2014)
- (Argentina) Juan Pablo Raponi (2014)
- (Paraguay) Domingo Salcedo (2014)
- (Uruguay) Alejandro Prieto (2018–)
- (Brazil) Bruno Renan (2018–)

Non-CONMEBOL players

- (Portugal) Thiago França (2011)
