= Tacuary =

Association football club in Paraguay

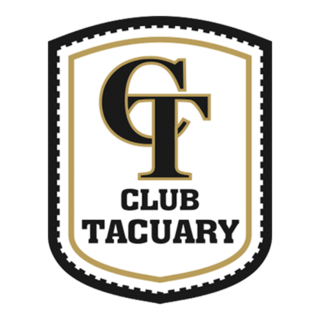
- Full name: Tacuary Football Club
- Nicknames: El Gigante De Barrio Jara; El Tacua; Los Albinegros; Tacuarienses
- Founded: 10 December 1923; 102 years ago
- Ground: Estadio Toribio Vargas
- Capacity: 3,000
- Chairman: Jorge Amancio Cáceres
- Manager: Luis de la Riva
- League: División Intermedia
- 2025: División Intermedia, 9th of 16
Home colours	Away colours	Third colours

Club Tacuary is a Paraguayan First Division football team, based in the neighborhood of Jara in Asunción. The club was founded in 1923.

Tacuary qualified for the Copa Libertadores tournament twice (in 2005 and 2007) and the Copa Sudamericana three times (in 2007, 2012 and 2023). In 2013 it returned to the Paraguayan Segunda División.

In the 2021 season of Paraguay's División Intermedia, Tacuary finished 3rd and was promoted to the Primera División.

Over the years Tacuary's youth academy has produced players such as Ramón Cardozo, Hernán Pérez, Luis Páez, Ronald Huth and Brian Montenegro, as well as other young players that have been sold to important club in the European and Mexican leagues.

== Stadium ==
The club has traditionally played at the 3,000 capacity Estadio Toribio Vargas which is based in Jara neighbourhood. Between 2002 and 2014 however, the club played at the 7,000 capacity Roberto Bettega in the Zeballos Cué neighbourhood. In 2014 the club sold the stadium to a port company for 10 million dollars, and it was subsequently demolished. The club is now back playing in its traditional home.

== Honours ==
- Paraguayan Second Division: 1

2002

- Paraguayan Third Division: 4

1953, 1961, 1983, 1999

== Performance in CONMEBOL competitions ==
- Copa Libertadores: 2 appearances

2005: Preliminary Round
2007: Preliminary Round

- Copa Sudamericana: 3 appearances

2007: First Round
2012: First Round
2023: Group stage

== Current squad ==
=== Current squad ===
As of 24 January, 2024. Note: Flags indicate national team as defined under FIFA eligibility rules; some limited exceptions apply. Players may hold more than one non-FIFA nationality.

No.	Pos.	Nation	Player
1	GK	PAR	Héctor Espínola
2	DF	PAR	Alexis Fernández
3	DF	BRA	Victor Ferraz
4	DF	PAR	Edgar Benítez
5	DF	PAR	Marcos Cáceres
6	MF	PAR	Marcelo Paredes
7	FW	PAR	Néstor Camacho
8	MF	PAR	Ronal Domínguez
9	FW	PAR	José Verdún
10	MF	PAR	Derlis Rodríguez
11	MF	PAR	Óscar Ruiz
12	GK	PAR	Aldo Bareiro
14	DF	PAR	Rodney Pedrozo
16	MF	ARG	Nelson Acevedo
17	FW	PAR	Nicolás Morínigo

No.	Pos.	Nation	Player
18	DF	PAR	Luis Cabral
20	MF	PAR	Matías Verdún
21	FW	PAR	Osmar Colmán
22	GK	PAR	Diego Huesca
24	FW	PAR	Carlos Giménez
26	MF	PAR	Lucas Romero
27	MF	PAR	Jorge González
29	FW	PAR	Mario Otazú
30	DF	BRA	Helerson
32	MF	PAR	Gustavo Medina
33	FW	PAR	Martín Núñez
37	DF	PAR	Walter Clar
39	FW	COL	Orlando Berrío
—	FW	PAR	Darío Lezcano (on loan from Colo-Colo)

== Notable players ==
To appear in this section a player must have either:

- Played at least 125 games for the club.
- Set a club record or won an individual award while at the club.
- Been part of a national team at any time.
- Played in the first division of any other football association (outside of Paraguay).
- Played in a continental and/or intercontinental competition.

1990s

- (Paraguay) Ronald Huth (1999–2007, 2009–2011, 2012)

2000s'

- (Paraguay) Osvaldo Mendoza (2002)
- (Paraguay) Brian Montenegro (2004–2011, 2012)
- (Paraguay) Hernán Pérez (2005–2008)
- (Paraguay) Ramón Cardozo (2006–2012)
- (Paraguay) Luis Fernando Páez (–2006, 2009–)
- (Argentina) Fabian Caballero (2006, 2012)
- (Paraguay) José Ariel Núñez (2008–2009)

Non-CONMEBOL players

- (Mexico) Enrique Maximiliano Meza (2004–2005)
- (Japan) Riki Kitawaki (2005–2012)
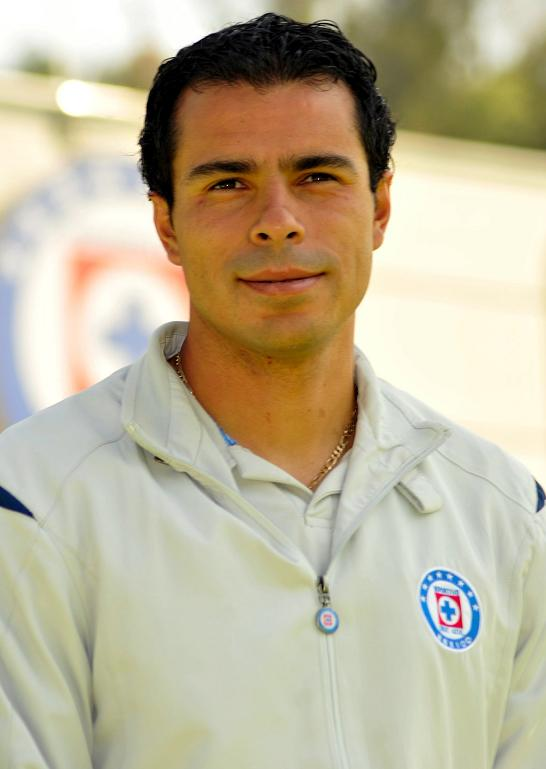
Mexican player Enrique Maximiliano Meza joined Tacuary in 2004 and remained until 2005

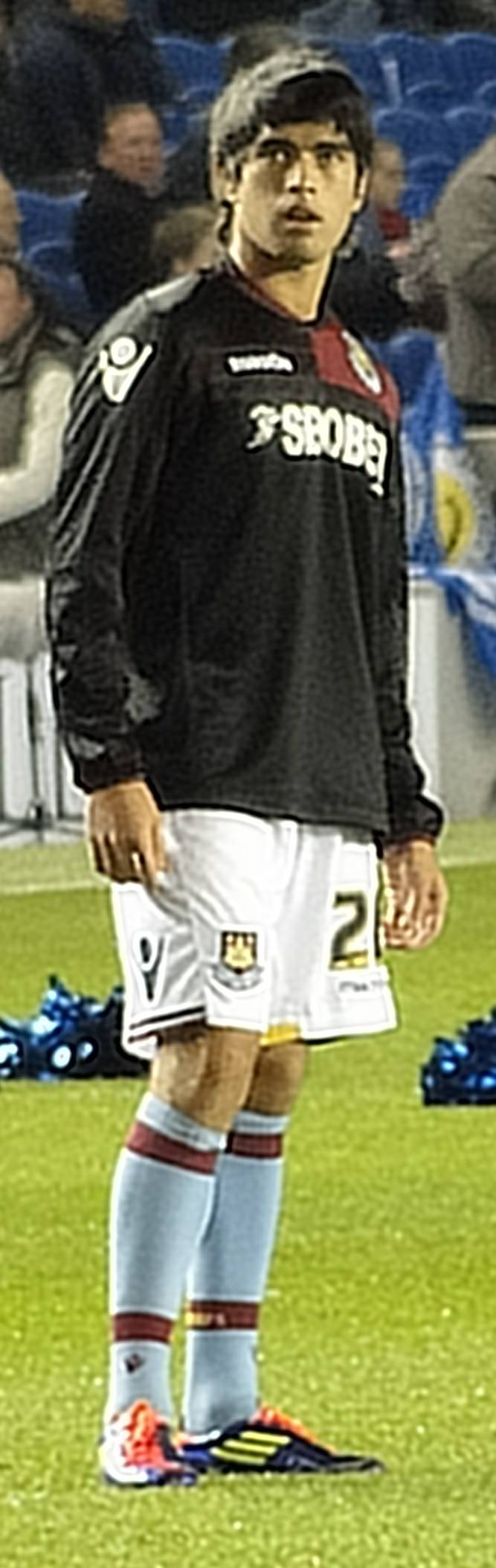
Brian Montenegro started his career at the club and went on to feature for West Ham United and Leeds United

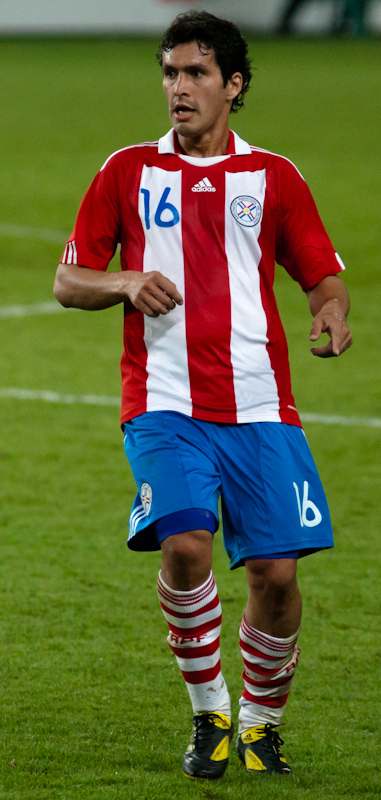
Cristian Riveros was at the club from 2000 to 2005

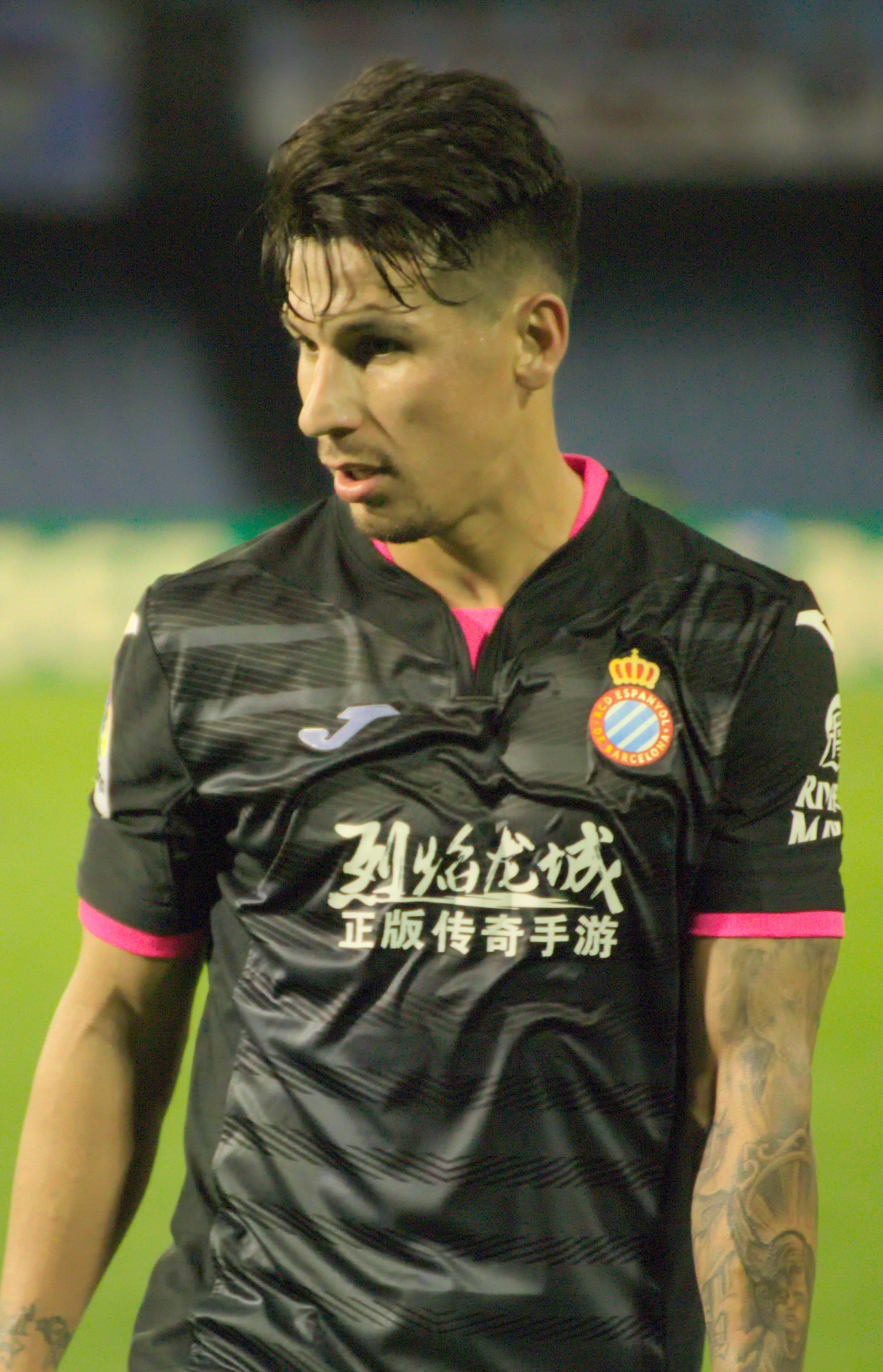
Hernan Perez was a member of the Tacuary youth academy before debuting in Primera División

== Managers ==
- (Argentina) Oscar Paulin
- (Paraguay) Carlos Kiese (1 January 2010 – 31 December 2010)
- (Uruguay) Carlos Manta (1 January 2011 – 1 July 2011)
- (Argentina) Francisco Ocampo (footballer) (1 January 2011 – 10 April 2012)
- (Uruguay) Luis Cubilla (10 April 2012 – 16 May 2012)
- (Argentina) Gonzalo Ocampo (18 May 2012–)
