= 2007 Club Olimpia season =

The following is a summary of the 2007 season by Paraguayan football (soccer) club Olimpia Asunción.

Olimpia participated in the following competitions in 2007: Torneo Apertura and Torneo Clausura (pertaining to the Paraguayan first division).

== Torneo Apertura 2007 ==
For the start of the 2007 season Olimpia had former player and star José Cardozo as the coach. However, results were not good and Alicio Solalinde replaced him halfway during the tournament.

=== Team roster ===
Note: Flags indicate national team as defined under FIFA eligibility rules; some limited exceptions apply. Players may hold more than one non-FIFA nationality.

No.	Pos.	Nation	Player
1	GK	URU	Leonardo Bordad
2	DF	URU	Diego Ciz
3	DF	PAR	Michel Godoy
4	DF	PAR	Carlos Gamarra
5	DF	PAR	Ignacio Rolón
6	MF	PAR	Victor Quintana (captain)
7	FW	PAR	Mauro Caballero
8	FW	URU	Diego Perrone
10	FW	PAR	Rodrigo Rojas
11	FW	PAR	José Amarilla
12	GK	PAR	Henry Lapczyk
13	FW	URU	Martín García
14	MF	URU	Christian Callejas
15	MF	PAR	Osmar Molinas
16	DF	PAR	Cristian Martínez
17	MF	PAR	Ángel Ortíz
18	DF	PAR	Luis Romero

No.	Pos.	Nation	Player
19	DF	PAR	Oscar Jiménez
20	MF	COL	Mauricio Molina
21	MF	PAR	Blas Irala
22	FW	PAR	Aquilino Villalba
23	FW	PAR	Cristian Ledesma
24	DF	PAR	Ángel Ramos
25	FW	ARG	Hebert Arriola
26	DF	PAR	Roberto Bonet
29	FW	PAR	Jorge Gallardo
30	FW	PAR	Ismael Fernández
31	MF	PAR	Cristian Álvarez
36	FW	PAR	Juvenal Cardozo
--	GK	PAR	Luis Fernández
--	GK	PAR	Blas Hermosilla
--	DF	PAR	César Zayas
--	MF	PAR	Diego Benítez
--	MF	PAR	Rubén Insfrán

=== Final standing ===
Team	Pts	GP	W	D	L	GF	GA	DIFF
1 Club Sportivo Luqueño	47	22	14	5	3	45	22	+23
2 Cerro Porteño	43	22	13	4	5	42	18	+24
3 Club Libertad	40	22	11	7	4	30	16	+14
4 Olimpia	38	22	10	8	4	29	21	+8
5 Club 3 de Febrero	30	22	8	6	8	23	25	-2
6 Club Nacional	26	22	6	8	8	25	23	+2
7 Tacuary	26	22	7	5	10	20	32	-12
8 Sportivo Trinidense	24	22	6	6	10	24	39	-15
9 Club Sol de América	23	22	5	8	9	19	29	-10
10 Club 12 de Octubre	23	22	6	5	11	27	38	-11
11 Club 2 de Mayo	21	22	4	9	9	24	32	-8
12 Club Guaraní	16	22	3	7	12	26	39	-13

=== Results ===
Torneo Apertura 2007
Matchday	Home team	Result	Away team
1	Olimpia	1 - 1	Nacional
2	Libertad	2 - 2	Olimpia
3	Olimpia	2 - 2	3 de Febrero
4	2 de Mayo	3 - 1	Olimpia
5	Olimpia	3 - 1	Guarani
6	Sportivo Trinidense	1 - 0	Olimpia
7	Olimpia	3 - 2	12 de Octubre
8	Tacuary	0 - 1	Olimpia
9	Olimpia	1 - 0	Sol de América
10	Olimpia	0 - 1	Cerro Porteño
11	Sportivo Luqueño	2 - 2	Olimpia
12	Nacional	0 - 1	Olimpia
13	Olimpia	0 - 1	Libertad
14	3 de Febrero	0 - 1	Olimpia
15	Olimpia	3 - 1	2 de Mayo
16	Guaraní	1 - 2	Olimpia
17	Olimpia	3 - 1	Sportivo Trinidense
18	12 de Octubre	0 - 0	Olimpia
19	Olimpia	2 - 2	Tacuary
20	Sol de América	0 - 1	Olimpia
21	Cerro Porteño	0 - 0	Olimpia
22	Olimpia	0 - 0	Sportivo Luqueño

=== Top scorers ===
Cristian Rolando Ledesma finished as the top scorer for Olimpia in the Apertura tournament with 10 goals scored. Mauricio Molina with 10 goals.

== Torneo Clausura 2007 ==
For the Clausura tournament, Alicio Solalinde continued at the helm of the team but was eventually replaced by Carlos Jara Saguier due to poor results. Important signings included that of Paraguayan international veteran Roberto Acuña from Rosario Central, Osvaldo Diaz from Club Guaraní and Rolando Renaut from Club 12 de Octubre.

=== Team roster ===
Note: Flags indicate national team as defined under FIFA eligibility rules; some limited exceptions apply. Players may hold more than one non-FIFA nationality.

No.	Pos.	Nation	Player
1	GK	PAR	Henry Lapczyk
2	DF	URU	Diego Ciz
3	DF	PAR	Roberto Bonet
4	DF	PAR	Carlos Gamarra (captain)
5	DF	PAR	Ignacio Rolón
6	MF	PAR	Victor Quintana
7	FW	PAR	Edison Giménez
8	MF	PAR	Roberto Acuña
9	FW	PAR	Gilberto Palacios
10	MF	PAR	Osvaldo Díaz
11	MF	PAR	Cristian Martínez
12	GK	URU	Leonardo Bordad
13	FW	URU	Martín García
14	DF	PAR	Gilberto Velázquez
15	MF	PAR	David Villalba
16	MF	PAR	Ricardo Ortíz
17	MF	PAR	Ángel Ortíz

No.	Pos.	Nation	Player
19	DF	PAR	Oscar Jiménez
21	MF	PAR	Blas Irala
22	MF	PAR	Osmar Molinas
23	MF	PAR	Rolando Renaut
25	FW	PAR	Jorge Gallardo
28	DF	PAR	Darío Caballero
35	FW	PAR	Amílcar Franco
--	GK	PAR	Blas Hermosilla
--	GK	ARG	Alejandro Saucedo
--	DF	PAR	Michel Godoy
--	DF	PAR	Julio César Torres
--	DF	PAR	César Zayas
--	MF	PAR	Cristian Álvarez
--	MF	PAR	Milton Benítez
--	MF	PAR	Rodrigo Rojas
--	FW	ARG	Roberto Hernández
--	FW	PAR	Ismael Fernández

=== Final standing ===
Team	Pts	GP	W	D	L	GF	GA	DIFF
1 Club Libertad	55	22	17	4	1	36	14	+22
2 Cerro Porteño	49	22	15	4	3	52	21	+31
3 Olimpia	38	22	11	5	6	33	23	+10
4 Club Sol de América	34	22	9	7	6	32	24	+8
5 Club Nacional	34	22	9	7	6	37	30	+7
6 Club 12 de Octubre	26	22	7	5	10	23	29	-6
7 Club Guaraní	25	22	6	7	9	24	27	-3
8 Tacuary	25	22	6	7	9	25	29	-4
9 Sportivo Trinidense	24	22	5	9	8	15	18	-3
10 Club Sportivo Luqueño	19	22	5	4	13	24	41	-17
11 Club 3 de febrero	19	22	5	4	13	21	41	-20
12 Club 2 de Mayo	13	22	2	7	13	16	41	-25

=== Results ===
Torneo Clausura 2007
Matchday	Home team	Result	Away team
1	Sol de América	1 - 2	Olimpia
2	Olimpia	0 - 0	Libertad
3	Nacional	0 - 0	Olimpia
4	Olimpia	2 - 0	2 de Mayo
5	Sportivo Trinidense	0 - 0	Olimpia
6	Olimpia	2 - 3	12 de Octubre
7	Sportivo Luqueño	1 - 2	Olimpia
8	Olimpia	1 - 0	Guaraní
9	Tacuary	0 - 1	Olimpia
10	Olimpia	2 - 1	Cerro Porteño
11	3 de Febrero	1 - 1	Olimpia
12	Olimpia	1 - 2	Sol de América
13	Libertad	0 - 1	Olimpia
14	Olimpia	2 - 3	Nacional
15	2 de Mayo	1 - 3	Olimpia
16	Olimpia	2 - 1	Sportivo Trinidense
17	12 de Octubre	0 - 3	Olimpia
18	Olimpia	5 - 1	Sportivo Luqueño
19	Guaraní	2 - 0	Olimpia
20	Olimpia	1 - 1	Tacuary
21	Cerro Porteño	3 - 1	Olimpia
22	Olimpia	1 - 2	3 de Febrero

=== Top scorers ===
Martin Adrian Garcia was the top scorer for the Clausura, finishing with 10 goals. Gilberto Palacios finished in second with 9 goals.

== Aggregate table 2007 ==
Olimpia finished in third place overall for the 2007 season, which earned the team a spot in the Copa Sudamericana 2008.

Team	Pts	GP	W	D	L	GF	GA	DIFF
1 Club Libertad	95	44	28	11	5	66	30	+36
2 Cerro Porteño	92	44	28	8	8	94	39	+55
3 Olimpia	76	44	21	13	10	62	44	+18
4 Club Sportivo Luqueño	66	44	19	9	16	69	63	+6
5 Club Nacional	60	44	15	15	14	62	53	+9
6 Club Sol de América	57	44	14	15	15	51	53	-2
7 Tacuary	51	44	13	12	19	45	61	-16
8 Club 12 de Octubre	49	44	13	10	21	50	67	-17
9 Club 3 de Febrero	49	44	13	10	21	44	66	-22
10 Sportivo Trinidense	48	44	11	15	18	39	57	-18
11 Club Guaraní	41	44	9	14	21	50	66	-16
12 Club 2 de Mayo	34	44	6	16	22	40	73	-33

== See also ==
- 2008 Club Olimpia season
