= Torneo Clausura 2007 (Paraguay) =

Primera División
- Season: 2007 Clausura

The Torneo Clausura 2007 was the football (soccer) tournament that closed the season in the Paraguayan first division in the year 2007.

The tournament began on August 3 and ended on December 2 with the participation of 12 teams, with a two-legged all play all system. The winner was Libertad, which gained the right to play the Copa Libertadores 2008 and the national championship final against Sportivo Luqueño (winners of the 2007 Apertura.

== Positions ==
Pos	Team	Pld	W	D	L	GF	GA	GD	Pts
1	Libertad	22	17	4	1	36	14	+22	55
2	Cerro Porteño	22	15	4	3	52	21	+31	49
3	Olimpia	22	11	5	6	33	23	+10	38
4	Sol de América	22	9	7	6	32	24	+8	34
5	Nacional	22	9	7	6	37	30	+7	34
6	12 de Octubre	22	7	5	10	23	29	−6	26
7	Guaraní	22	6	7	9	24	27	−3	25
8	Tacuary	22	6	7	9	25	29	−4	25
9	Sportivo Trinidense	22	5	9	8	15	18	−3	24
10	Sportivo Luqueño	22	5	4	13	24	41	−17	19
11	3 de febrero	22	5	4	13	21	41	−20	19
12	2 de Mayo	22	2	7	13	16	41	−25	13

== Results ==
Matchday 1
Home team	Result	Away team
Libertad	3 - 2	Cerro Porteño
Sportivo Trinidense	1 - 3	Sportivo Luqueño
Nacional	1 - 0	Tacuary
Sol de América	1 - 2	Olimpia
2 de Mayo	1 - 1	Guaraní
3 de Febrero	2 - 2	12 de Octubre

Matchday 2
Home team	Result	Away team
Tacuary	0 - 2	2 de Mayo
Sportivo Luqueño	0 - 0	12 de Octubre
Guaraní	0 - 1	Sportivo Trinidense
Sol de América	0 - 0	3 de Febrero
Cerro Porteño	1 - 0	Nacional
Olimpia	0 - 0	Libertad

Matchday 3
Home team	Result	Away team
Libertad	3 - 1	Sol de América
12 de Octubre	1 - 0	Guaraní
3 de Febrero	2 - 0	Sportivo Luqueño
Nacional	0 - 0	Olimpia
2 de Mayo	0 - 1	Cerro Porteño
Sportivo Trinidense	1 - 2	Tacuary

Matchday 4
Home team	Result	Away team
Tacuary	1 - 0	12 de Octubre
Libertad	2 - 1	3 de Febrero
Sol de América	3 - 3	Nacional
Cerro Porteño	0 - 0	Sportivo Trinidense
Guaraní	2 - 1	Sportivo Luqueño
Olimpia	2 - 0	2 de Mayo

Matchday 5
Home team	Result	Away team
12 de Octubre	2 - 3	Cerro Porteño
Nacional	1 - 2	Libertad
Sportivo Luqueño	0 - 3	Tacuary
3 de Febrero	1 - 0	Guarani
2 de Mayo	1 - 2	Sol de América
Sportivo Trinidense	0 - 0	Olimpia

Matchday 6
Home team	Result	Away team
Nacional	6 - 2	3 de Febrero
Olimpia	2 - 3	12 de Octubre
Libertad	3 - 1	2 de Mayo
Cerro Porteño	1 - 0	Sportivo Luqueño
Sol de América	0 - 0	Sportivo Trinidense
Tacuary	0 - 1	Guaraní

Matchday 7
Home team	Result	Away team
12 de Octubre	0 - 1	Sol de América
Sportivo Luqueño	1 - 2	Olimpia
2 de Mayo	2 - 1	Nacional
Sportivo Trinidense	1 - 2	Libertad
3 de Febrero	2 - 4	Tacuary
Guaraní	1 - 4	Cerro Porteño

Matchday 8
Home team	Result	Away team
Libertad	1 - 0	12 de Octubre
Nacional	1 - 1	Sportivo Trinidense
Sol de América	4 - 2	Sportivo Luqueño
Olimpia	1 - 0	Guaraní
2 de Mayo	1 - 2	3 de Febrero
Cerro Porteño	5 - 1	Tacuary

Matchday 9
Home team	Result	Away team
3 de Febrero	0 - 5	Cerro Porteño
Sportivo Luqueño	0 - 1	Libertad
Guaraní	0 - 0	Sol de América
Sportivo Trinidense	0 - 0	2 de Mayo
12 de Octubre	0 - 1	Nacional
Tacuary	0 - 1	Olimpia

Matchday 10
Home team	Result	Away team
Sol de América	1 - 1	Tacuary
Olimpia	2 - 1	Cerro Porteño
Nacional	2 - 1	Sportivo Luqueño
2 de Mayo	0 - 1	12 de Octubre
Sportivo Trinidense	1 - 0	3 de Febrero
Libertad	2 - 1	Guaraní

Matchday 11
Home team	Result	Away team
3 de Febrero	1 - 1	Olimpia
Guaraní	2 - 1	Nacional
Sportivo Luqueño	1 - 1	2 de Mayo
12 de Octubre	0 - 1	Sportivo Trinidense
Tacuary	1 - 1	Libertad
Cerro Porteño	2 - 1	Sol de América

Matchday 12
Home team	Result	Away team
Olimpia	1 - 2	Sol de América
Guaraní	4 - 0	2 de Mayo
Tacuary	2 - 2	Nacional
12 de Octubre	2 - 0	3 de Febrero
Cerro Porteño	0 - 0	Libertad
Sportivo Luqueño	1 - 0	Sportivo Trinidense

Matchday 13
Home team	Result	Away team
Nacional	1 - 3	Cerro Porteño
3 de Febrero	0 - 1	Sol de América
2 de Mayo	0 - 0	Tacuary
Sportivo Trinidense	2 - 1	Guaraní
12 de Octubre	2 - 1	Sportivo Luqueño
Libertad	0 - 1	Olimpia

Matchday 14
Home team	Result	Away team
Sol de América	0 - 1	Libertad
Cerro Porteño	4 - 0	2 de Mayo
Guaraní	2 - 2	12 de Octubre
Sportivo Luqueño	2 - 1	3 de Febrero
Tacuary	0 - 0	Sportivo Trinidense
Olimpia	2 - 3	Nacional

Matchday 15
Home team	Result	Away team
Nacional	3 - 1	Sol de América
Sportivo Luqueño	1 - 1	Guaraní
12 de Octubre	3 - 0	Tacuary
Sportivo Trinidense	0 - 1	Cerro Porteño
3 de Febrero	1 - 2	Libertad
2 de Mayo	1 - 3	Olimpia

Matchday 16
Home team	Result	Away team
Tacuary	4 - 1	Sportivo Luqueño
Sol de América	6 - 0	2 de Mayo
Cerro Porteño	4 - 1	12 de Octubre
Guaraní	1 - 1	3 de Febrero
Olimpia	2 - 1	Sportivo Trinidense
Libertad	2 - 1	Nacional

Matchday 17
Home team	Result	Away team
2 de Mayo	1 - 3	Libertad
12 de Octubre	0 - 3	Olimpia
3 de Febrero	1 - 3	Nacional
Guaraní	1 - 0	Tacuary
Sportivo Luqueño	2 - 1	Cerro Porteño
Sportivo Trinidense	0 - 0	Sol de América

Matchday 18
Home team	Result	Away team
Cerro Porteño	4 - 1	Guaraní
Libertad	1 - 0	Sportivo Trinidense
Nacional	1 - 0	2 de Mayo
Olimpia	5 - 1	Sportivo Luqueño
Sol de América	1 - 0	12 de Octubre
Tacuary	2 - 0	3 de Febrero

Matchday 19
Home team	Result	Away team
Guaraní	2 - 0	Olimpia
Sportivo Trinidense	1 - 1	Nacional
Sportivo Luqueño	2 - 1	Sol de América
Tacuary	3 - 3	Cerro Porteño
12 de Octubre	0 - 3	Libertad
3 de Febrero	2 - 1	2 de Mayo

Matchday 20
Home team	Result	Away team
Olimpia	1 - 1	Tacuary
2 de Mayo	1 - 1	Sportivo Trinidense
Sol de América	2 - 1	Guaraní
Nacional	0 - 0	12 de Octubre
Cerro Porteño	2 - 0	3 de Febrero
Libertad	3 - 1	Sportivo Luqueño

Matchday 21
Home team	Result	Away team
Tacuary	0 - 2	Sol de América
12 de Octubre	2 - 2	2 de Mayo
3 de Febrero	0 - 2	Sportivo Trinidense
Cerro Porteño	3 - 1	Olimpia
Guarani	0 - 0	Libertad
Sportivo Luqueño	2 - 3	Nacional

Matchday 22
Home team	Result	Away team
Libertad	1 - 0	Tacuary
Olimpia	1 - 2	3 de Febrero
2 de Mayo	1 - 1	Sportivo Luqueño
Nacional	2 - 2	Guaraní
Sportivo Trinidense	1 - 2	12 de Octubre
Sol de América	2 - 2	Cerro Porteño

== Finals ==
=== First leg ===
9 December 2007
18:00
First leg

Sportivo Luqueño	1–1	Libertad

=== Second leg ===
14 December 2007
19:00
Second leg

Libertad	2–0	Sportivo Luqueño

== Top scorers ==
Player		Goals	Team
Paraguay	Fabio Ramos	15	Nacional
Paraguay	Pablo Zeballos	15	Sol de América
Paraguay	Jorge Achucarro	14	Cerro Porteño
Colombia	Vladimir Marín	13	Libertad
Paraguay	Roberto Gamarra	12	Libertad
Paraguay	Osvaldo Martínez	11	Libertad
Uruguay	Martín García	10	Olimpia
Paraguay	Gilberto Palacios	9	Olimpia

== Transfers ==
In:

- (Chile) Ivan Herrera Returns from (Chile) Lota Schwager
- (Argentina) Ignacio Don On Loan from (Paraguay) Nacional
- (Paraguay) Herminio Miranda Signed from (Paraguay) Nacional

Out:

- (Argentina) Ariel Pereyra Retired
- (Argentina) Cristián Muñoz Transferred to (Chile) Colo Colo
- Pedro Morales Transferred to Universidad de Chile

== See also ==
- 2007 in Paraguayan football
