= Jang Hee-mang =

South Korean footballer

Personal information
- Date of birth: 7 March 1992 (age 34)
- Place of birth: Pohang, South Korea
- Height: 1.89 m (6 ft 2 in)
- Position: Centre-back

Youth career
- Pohang Jecheol High School
- Dong-Eui University

Senior career*
| Years | Team | Apps | (Gls) |
| 2016 | Académico de Viseu | 0 | (0) |
| 2017 | Mirandela | 6 | (0) |
| 2017–2018 | Sportivo Trinidense | | |
| 2018–2019 | River Plate Asunción | 15 | (0) |
| 2020 | 12 de Octubre | 4 | (0) |
Korean name
| Hangul | 장희망 |
| Hanja | 張希望 |
| RR | Jang Huimang |
| MR | Chang Hŭimang |
- * Club domestic league appearances and goals as of 29 October 2021

Jang Hee-mang (Korean: 장희망; born 7 March 1992) is a South Korean professional footballer who last played as a centre-back for 12 de Octubre in the Primera División Paraguaya. He played for three years in Paraguayan Football.

== Career ==
Hee-mang was born in Pohang, South Korea.

=== Académico de Viseu ===
Upon his signing with Portuguese club Académico de Viseu, he was one of three South Korean players signed by the club.

=== Sportivo Trinidense ===
==== 2017 season ====
On 14 July 2017, Jang officially joined Sportivo Trinidense on a free transfer. On 18 July 2017, Tigo Sports reported that the player signed with Sportivo Trinidense. Paraguay Sport Press also reported the player's signing. Paraguayan newspaper ABC Color informed that the player was incorporated to the squad's activities several days prior to his signing and before the confirmation of his contract, having arrived at the club accompanied by his representative, Derlis Maidana.

In the 2017 Sportivo Trinidense team, he joined Elvis Marecos, Arturo Aquino, Maximo Ortiz, Fabio Ramos, Ignacio Miño, Fabio Escobar, Julio Santa Cruz, Brazilian Rodrigo Teixeira and Argentine Sergio Escalante. On 15 September 2017, Jang debuted for Sportivo Trinidense in the Primera División in a 5–0 away victory against Nacional Asunción, when he entered the field in the 80th minute for Jorge Gonzalez. On 13 October 2017, Jang made his full debut for Sportivo Trinidense in a 1–0 home defeat against Cerro Porteño, playing until the 68th minute. On 10 December 2017, Jang played an entire 90 minutes in his last 2017 season appearance, a 4–2 home defeat against Sportivo Luqueño.

Jang made five Primera División Paraguaya appearances for the 2017 season.

==== 2018 season ====
Jang remained a Trinidense player, even when the club had been relegated to the country's second-tier league for 2018 season. For the 2018 season, Jang colleagued with Arístides Florentín, Jorge Achucarro and the Colombian Vladimir Marin. His first game in the 2018 División Intermedia season was against 2 de Mayo of the Pedro Juan Caballero city on 18 March, entering as a substitute on 70 minutes for Juan González. During what was a financially difficult moment for Sportivo Trinidense players, Versus reported that Jang survived upon what the club gave him, despite that he be from a wealthy family in Korea. His agent, Derlis Maidana, commented that Jang did not lack anything.

"I rent him an apartment. He had a salary with Trinidense but his contract expired. He doesn't usually ask for much, but what he needs sometimes he tells me."' – Jang's agent speaking about the player's financial situation at the club.

In the 2018 Copa Paraguay, Jang played part in Trinidense's Round of 16 tie with Nacional Asunción on 24 October, winning in a penalty shoot-out.

Between 2017 and 2018, Jang appeared in 32 games for Sportivo Trinidense.

=== River Plate Asunción ===
In December 2018, D10 announced that Jang joined River Plate Asunción. At River Plate Asunción in 2019, Jang teammates with Robin Ramirez, Marco Prieto, Cristian Bogado, Nildo Viera, Argentines Santiago Camacho, Emiliano Aguero, Mateo Bustos and Jonathan Requena, Brazilian Júlio Cézar and Uruguayan Richard Fernández.

On 31 March 2019, Jang started in a 3–1 away defeat against Sportivo Luqueño and was replaced by Fernando Escobar.

In the 2019 Primera División Paraguaya season, Jang made 15 appearances for River Plate Asunción.

=== 12 de Octubre Itaguá ===
In 2020, Jang joined 12 de Octubre de Itaguá for the Primera División Paraguaya season. On 4 September 2020, Jang came on as a substitute for Victor Ayala in a 1–0 home defeat against former team River Plate Asunción. During the 2020 Primera División Paraguaya season, Jang appeared in 4 games for 12 de Octubre.

== See also ==
- List of expatriate footballers in Paraguay
- Players and Records in Paraguayan Football
