= Bryan Lopez =

American soccer player

Personal information
- Full name: Bryan Steven López González
- Date of birth: June 12, 1988 (age 38)
- Place of birth: Queens, New York, United States
- Height: 6 ft 3 in (1.91 m)
- Position: Goalkeeper

Youth career
- 2004–2007: Sportivo Luqueño

Senior career*
Years	Team	Apps	(Gls)
2007–2013	Sportivo Luqueño		
2010	→ Fernando de la Mora (loan)		
2013	Presidente Hayes		
2014	Sportivo San Lorenzo		
2015–2018	Clarkstown Eagles		
2018	Cedars Star Academy		
- * Club domestic league appearances and goals

Bryan Steven López González (born June 12, 1988) is an American soccer player who plays a goalkeeper. He last played for Cedars Star Academy in the Cosmopolitan Soccer League.

He is son of former Paraguayan footballer, Pedro López, who played for the Paraguay national football team during the 1980s. Lopez was the second Paraguayan American to play football in Paraguay, which had been preceded by Jerry Laterza (1994–1995), and played in the Copa Libertadores and for clubs as Sportivo Luqueño, Fernando de la Mora, Presidente Hayes and Sportivo San Lorenzo. Between 2007 and 2014, Lopez endured sufficiently to perpetuate in the Asociación Paraguaya de Fútbol as one of few non-CONMEBOL players to do this, and holds the longest participation as a CONCACAF footballer in Paraguayan football.

He achieved a runners-up position with his club in the final stages of the 2018 NPSL season.

== Career ==
=== Sportivo Luqueño ===
==== Youth career ====
López participated in the APF's U19 Torneo Juvenil in 2007 for Sportivo Luqueño in the team's first victory of the Tornro Apertura against Guaraní. The ABC Color reported, that in the balanced game that ended in a 1–0 victory in favor of Sportivo Luqueño, in injury time the North American goalkeeper Lopez had a big intervention and saved a penalty executed by Adrian Benitez.

==== 2007–2008: First team, Debut and Copa Libertadores ====
In 2007, Lopez was in Sportivo Luqueño's reserve ranks with Ignacio Fernandez. On 5 September 2007, it was announced that the young Lopez would debut against Olimpia Asunción. In November 2007, it was announced the Lopez and Ignacio Fernandez would make their first-team debuts against 2 de Mayo. Sportivo Luqueño qualified for the 2008 Copa Libertadores after being crowned the 2007 Apertura champion of the 2007 Paraguayan Primera Division season. In the 2008 Sportivo Luqueño roster Lopez colleagued with Arístides Florentín, Celso Esquivel, Argentines Javier Liendo and Valentin Filippini and Spaniard Ruben Sanchez Montero. On 10 March 2008, Ultima Hora reported that coach Daniel Lanata and goalkeeper Bryan Lopez had an argument which resulted in the coach dropping the goalkeeper to the lower category. Following this, the goalkeeper announced that he would not return to the club. One month later, Lopez participated in one 2008 Copa Libertadores fixture, a 3–1 home loss against Colombian club, Atlético Nacional, on 11 April 2008, where he played a full 90-minutes for his side. Sportivo Luqueño finished in third position in their respective Copa Libertadores group, with 8 points, one point shy of second place. In the same month, Lopez goalkeeped in a game against Olimpia Asunción, and he was a highlighted player in a 1–0 defeat against Libertad. By July 2008, Lopez and goalkeeper colleague Arístides Florentín remained at Sportivo Luqueño for the second semester of the 2008 season.

==== 2012 season ====
In 2012, Lopez shared the goalkeeping duty with Ever Caballero, Tobias Vargas and Dionisio Gonzalez, being coached by goalkeeper preparer Nolberto Tullo. Lopez made his first appearance in the 2012 season in a 1–0 away loss against Club Libertad on 12 February. He made his second appearance in the 2012 season in a 1–3 home loss against Independiente de Campo Grande on 18 March, playing a full-90 minutes and receiving a yellow card in the 9th minute. In October 2012, Lopez faced injury. In April 2012, Lopez received a shot to the eye in a reserve category game against Nacional Asunción, which required one month of recovery.

==== 2013 ====
On 13 January 2013, it was reported by ABC Color that Lopez had departed Sportivo Luqueño, lamenting that football in Paraguay is handled under an atmosphere of greed and evil, consisting of coaches that do not allow the professional growth of young players. He also thanked Sportivo Luqueño for all of their support provided for more than 10 years.

=== Presidente Hayes ===
On 10 August 2013, Lopez featured in a 2–0 home victory against Cristobal Colón in Paraguay's third division.

=== Sportivo San Lorenzo ===
In January 2014, it was announced that Lopez had joined Sportivo San Lorenzo for the 2014 División Intermedia season.

=== Clarkstown Eagles ===
==== 2015 ====
Lopez joined Clarkstown Eagles for the 2015 NPSL season. The team were crowned champions of the Keystone Conference, finishing in first position having conceded only five goals as Lopez earned seven clean sheets of the campaign. The team subsequently qualified for the 2015 NPSL Northeast Region playoffs. Clarkstown Eagles were defeated in the Region Final by New York Cosmos B, who eventually went on to win the National Final. Lopez had conceded two goals in the first half of the match as New York Cosmos B won 2–0.

==== 2016 ====
In July 2016, Clarkstown Eagles won 2–0 against New Jersey in the National Premier League North East Regional Final with López playing in the starting line up.

==== 2018 ====
Lopez achieved a runners-up position with his club in the final stages of the 2018 NPSL season.

=== Cedars Star Academy ===
By April 2018, Lopez was playing for Cedars Star Academy in the Cosmopolitan Soccer League. On 15 April 2018, Lopez kept against New York Pancyprian-Freedoms and was nominated for Player of the Week after making five saves in the game and keeping his 8th consecutive clean sheet, as well as keeping an 8-game winning streak for the team. Lopez was the first goalkeeper to be nominated for the award in the league's modern era.

== Personal life ==
Lopez was born in the United States of America to Paraguayan parents. His father, Pedro, played for the Paraguayan clubs Guaraní and Libertad, Bolivian club The Strongest, and also the Paraguay national football team.

== Career statistics ==
As of 16 October 2013

Appearances and goals by club, season and competition
Club	Season	League		Cup		Continental		Total	
Club	Season	Apps	Goals	Apps	Goals	Apps	Goals	Apps	Goals
Sportivo Luqueño	2007	1	0	–		0	0	1	0
Sportivo Luqueño	2008		0	–		1	0	1	0
Sportivo Luqueño	2009		0	–		0	0	0	0
Sportivo Luqueño	2011		0	–		0	0	0	0
Sportivo Luqueño	2012	2	0	–		–		2	0
Fernando de la Mora (loan)	2010		0	–		0	0	0	0
Presidente Hayes	2013	0	0	–		–		0	0
Sportivo San Lorenzo	2014	0	0	–		–		0	0
Career total		3	0	0	0	1	0	4	0

== See also ==
- List of expatriate footballers in Paraguay
- Players and Records in Paraguayan Football
