= Rubén Sánchez (footballer, born 1987) =

Spanish footballer (born 1987)

Personal information
- Full name: Rubén Sánchez Montero
- Date of birth: 3 July 1987 (age 39)
- Place of birth: Madrid, Spain
- Height: 1.92 m (6 ft 4 in)
- Position: Attacking midfielder

Youth career
- Coslada
- Las Rozas

Senior career*
Years	Team	Apps	(Gls)
2006	Vicálvaro		
2007	Bellinzona	1	(0)
2007	San Fernando de Henares		
2008	Vicálvaro	19	(3)
2008	Sportivo Luqueño		
2009	Levante	5	(1)
2009–2010	Ontinyent	14	(1)
2010–2011	Gandía	27	(3)
2011	Villanovense	2	(0)
2011	Almansa	15	(4)
2012	Coruxo	13	(0)
2012–2013	Sandecja Nowy Sącz	7	(0)
2013	Torre Levante		
2013–2014	Vicálvaro	1	(0)
- * Club domestic league appearances and goals

Rubén Sánchez Montero (born 3 July 1987) is a Spanish former professional footballer, coach and currently a businessman.

== Playing career ==
=== Early career ===
Sánchez was born in Madrid, Spain. With a height of 1.92 m, he came through the Atletico de Madrid youth system. Whilst in Atlético de Madrid's youth rosters, he played against players as Cesc Fabregas, Gerard Piqué and Antonio Adan. In 2007, he joined Swiss club AC Bellinzona.

=== Levante ===
In the 2008–09 Segunda División season, Sánchez played for Levante. He made five appearances and scored one goal against Elche.

=== Sportivo Luqueño ===
In the 2008 Sportivo Luqueño roster, Sánchez colleagued with Arístides Florentín, Celso Esquivel, Argentines Javier Liendo and Valentin Filippini and United States goalkeeper Bryan Lopez. Whilst at Sportivo Luqueño, he did not appear in the 2008 Copa Libertadores.

=== Latter career and retirement ===
In August 2011, he joined a 21-man roster at CF Villanovense in the Segunda B. In December 2011, Sánchez signed with Segunda División B club Coruxo FC. He joined the team to cover the absence of strikers Javi Zurbano.

==== Sandecja Nowy Sącz ====
On 29 September 2012, he debuted in Poland's I liga for Sandecja Nowy Sącz in a 2–0 home defeat against GKS Katowice, playing 90 minutes and wearing the number 10 jersey. On 6 October 2012, he started in a 4–0 away defeat against Stomil Olsztyn, playing until the 46th minute before being substituted off of the field for Sebastian Szczepanski. On 18 November 2012, he made his last appearance for Sandecja in a 1–0 away defeat against Kolejarz Stróże, when he was substituted onto the field for Filip Burkhardt in the 63rd minute.

He left the club after making seven appearances in the 2012–13 I liga.

== Coaching career ==
Following his retirement, he worked as a coach for Madrid-based club CD Vicálvaro.

== Style of play ==
Sánchez played as an attacking midfielder and liked to be creative on the field.

== Television ==
He appeared on the Spanish television reality show La Isla de las Tentaciones, making appearances in the first and third seasons of the competition.

== Personal life ==
Sánchez is from Barrio de Mejorada in Madrid. His favourite football club is Atlético de Madrid. His favourite players are Zinedine Zidane and Andres Iniesta.
