= Arístides Florentín =

Paraguayan footballer (born 1982)

Arístides Ramon Florentín Ocampos (born 10 May 1982) is a Paraguayan footballer who plays as a goalkeeper for Sportivo Trinidense in the Paraguayan División Intermedia, the country's second-tier league

== Career ==
=== Early career ===
Florentín was born in Caaguazú, Paraguay. He began late playing football at age 20, goalkeeping for Club 15 de Agosto in Caaguazú, temporarily leaving football for one year due to the few opportunities that he had, when he began harvesting cotton with his father.

=== Adult career ===
When Florentìn returned to football, he played for Fernando de la Mora, Cerro Porteño PF, General Díaz, 12 de Octubre, Sportivo Luqueño, and in Bolivia for Nacional Potosí and Real Potosí.

=== Fernando de la Mora ===
==== 2005 season ====
In 2005, Florentín joined Fernando de la Mora for the Primera División Paraguaya season. About his debut in the Primera División, Florentín commented that he could not sleep the night before and that he could not eat breakfast because of the nerves. Florentín's debut was in a 2–1 defeat against Cerro Porteño.

==== 2006 season ====
In 2006, he was teammates with Jailson, Maxi Biancucchi and Nestor Bareiro.

=== Sportivo Luqueño ===
==== 2009 season ====
In 2009, Florentín formed part of Sportivo Luqueno's squad for the Primera División season and joined the likes of Henry Lapczyk, Mario Villasanti and American Bryan Lopez in the club's goalkeeping team.

==== 2010 ====
Florentín remained at Sportivo Luqueño for the following season, which too provided the arrival of Japanese goalkeeper Hideaki Ozawa at the club.

=== General Caballero ZC ===
On 26 December 2010, Ultima Hora reported that Florentin was one of General Caballero's eleven new reinforcements of the preceding season, which included Brazilian Josías Cardoso. At beginnings of 2011, Florentin did not assist practices for two consecutive occasions with General Caballero due to what seemed that he was bothered by not being first choice goalkeeper. Florentin was one of the club's reinforcements for the 2011 Primera División season.

=== Cerro Porteño PF ===
On 24 December 2011, Florentín was confirmed as a new acquisition for Cerro Porteño PF's 2012 campaign under Uruguayan coach Eduardo Rivera. During the 2012 season, Florentín was teammates with future Paraguay national team player Fabian Balbuena at Cerro Porteño PF.

=== Bolivia ===
About his experience in Bolivia, Florentín stated that the altitude is not a myth and it is real and complicated, as he played for two clubs based in Bolivia's altitude.

"In Bolivia, it went well for me. At the beginning, it costed me to be able to play in the altitude, later, I got used to it. The altitude is not a myth, it is real and complicated. At the beginning, I suffered from high pression, my nose would bleed, I could not run. I tried Bolivia's Coca tea, it made well. Over there, the whole world consumes it. The experience was good." – Florentín speaking about his experience in Bolivia

==== Nacional Potosí ====
Florentín kept for Nacional Potosí in the 2013–14 Liga de Fútbol Profesional Boliviano season, amassing 36 appearances and qualified for the first round of the 2014 Copa Sudamericana.

==== Real Potosi ====
In July 2017, it was confirmed by El Diario that Florentín, along with defender Ronny Jiménez, were contracted by Real Potosí. The 35 year old Florentín accepted Potosi's offer with the objective of being the starting goalkeeper, as Florentin's arrival was brought through by his former goalkeeping teammate at Sportivo Luqueño and the then Potosí goalkeeper Henry Lapczyk, who interposed Florentín's good offices on the matter. In August 2017, Real Potosi's Argentine coach Julio Alberto Zamora decided on trying out Florentìn between the posts during a session. In November 2017, Florentín's compatriot and goalkeeping teammate, Henry Lapczyk converted into technical director at Real Potosí. In December 2017, Florentín was praised as the figure of a 0–0 draw against Club Blooming.

=== Sportivo Trinidense ===
==== 2018 season ====
In the 2018 Copa Paraguay, Florentin gave value to his experience when he helped Sportivo Trinidense advance to the quarter-final stages of the competition after winning a penalty shoot-out against Nacional Asunción, saved one penalty. Sportivo Trinidense already faced penalty shoot-outs in the first and second rounds of the Cup, which saw Florentín saves two penalties against Guaireña and another two against Olimpia Asunción. He formed part of the squad with South Korean footballer Hee-Mang Jang and Colombian Vladimir Marin.

In October 2018, Florentín stated that, when the Copa Paraguay would finalise, he would play in one of Paraguay's regional and interior leagues.

==== Liga Carapegüeña ====
At the ending months of 2018, Florentín, alongside his Trinidense teammate Vladimir Marín, featured for General Caballero de Beni Loma in the Liga Carapegüeña.

==== 2019 season ====
For the 2019 season, Florentin was captain of the Sportivo Trinidense squad. Happily embarking on his second season at the club, Florentin assured that Trinidense was a very serious institution.

==== 2020 season ====
At beginnings of the 2020 season, Florentín at Sportivo Trinidense had performed a great pre-season before the cancelation of the league.

==== 2020 COVID-19 Outbreak ====
Sportivo Trinidense, despite the pandemic, paid %50 of the player's salaries until the month of October. During the pandemic, Florentín, who has a farm where he raises laying hens, since 2018, continued selling eggs as a second stream of income. Many other players that did not have an income called Florentín to ask for help, that he give them eggs for them to re-sell.

== Personal life ==
Florentín is the son of land workers, his father produces vegetables such as tomatoes. After having few opportunity in football at age 20, he temporarily left football for one year and began harvesting cotton with his father. Since 2018, Florentin has a farm where he raises laying hens, a business which saved him during the COVID-19 outbreak in 2020. Florentín's father looks after the farm when his son is in Asunción. Florentin travels around the cities of Luque and Capiatá selling his eggs. He lives with his spouse and children in the city of Luque. Florentin's eldest son plays in the youth categories at General Díaz as a goalkeeper.
