= Maximo Ortiz =

Paraguayan footballer (born 1988)

Personal information
- Full name: Maximo Sebastian Ortiz
- Date of birth: 16 February 1988 (age 38)
- Place of birth: Lambaré, Paraguay
- Height: 1.73 m (5 ft 8 in)
- Position: Defender

International career
Years	Team	Apps	(Gls)
2005	Paraguay U17		(1)

Maximo Sebastian Ortiz (born 16 February 1988) is a Paraguayan former footballer who played as a defender. He represented the Paraguay national under-17 team at the 2005 South American U-17 Championship in Venezuela.

== Club career ==
In the 2009 season, Ortiz played for Fernando de la Mora, appearing in the División Intermedia.

In the 2011 season, Ortiz played for Sportivo Trinidense.

In the 2012 season, Ortiz appeared again for Fernando de la Mora.

In the 2013 season, Ortiz again played for Sportivo Trinidense. In the 2013 División Intermedia season, Ortiz played in a 1–0 away victory against Tacuary.

During the 2014 División Intermedia season, Ortiz played in a 1–0 home victory against Caacupe FBC.

In the 2016 División Intermedia season, Ortiz played for Ciudad del Este team 3 de Febrero.

In the 2017 Sportivo Trinidense team, he joined Elvis Marecos, Arturo Aquino, Fabio Ramos, Ignacio Miño, Fabio Escobar, Julio Santa Cruz, Rodrigo Teixeira, Sergio Escalante and Jang Hee-mang.

On 7 August 2018 in the Copa Paraguay, Ortiz scored for Tacuary in a penalty shoot-out defeat against Guaraní.

== International career ==
Ortiz played for Paraguay at the 2005 South American U-17 Championship. He scored in the 34th minute of a 3–1 victory against the host team Venezuela.
