= César Cañete =

Paraguayan footballer (born 1977)

Cesar Cañete
Personal information
- Full name: Cesar Daniel Cáceres Cañete
- Date of birth: 10 June 1977 (age 49)
- Place of birth: Luque, Paraguay
- Height: 1.73 m (5 ft 8 in)
- Position: Attacking midfielder

Senior career*
Years	Team	Apps	(Gls)
1996	Sport Colombia		
1997–1999	Sportivo Luqueño	44	(3)
2000–2001	Campomaiorense	9	(1)
2001–2002	12 de Octubre	9	(1)
2003	Sportivo Luqueño	21	(4)
2004	12 de Octubre	11	(1)
2004–2005	Sportivo Luqueño	41	(8)
2006	Olimpia	14	(3)
2006	Deportes Antofagasta	12	(0)
2007	Sportivo Luqueño	19	(12)
2007	Once Caldas	18	(1)
2008	Guaraní	39	(7)
2009	12 de Octubre	19	(2)
2009–2010	Guaraní	22	(11)
2011	3 de Febrero	39	(17)
2012	Sportivo Luqueño	19	(1)
2012–2013	Nacional	49	(9)
2015	Deportivo Capiatá	5	(0)
2019	San Martín de Porres	–	(–)
2022	Sportivo Luqueño	–	(–)

International career
1999	Paraguay	2	(0)

Managerial career
- 2001–2022: Sportivo Luqueño (assistant)
- * Club domestic league appearances and goals

Cesar Daniel Cáceres Cañete (born 10 June 1977) is a Paraguayan former footballer who played as an attacking midfielder.

== Career ==
Cáceres Cañete made his professional debut with Sport Colombia in 1996. Since he began his career in 1997 he has played most his career in Paraguay where he has played for Sportivo Luqueño, 12 de Octubre, Olimpia, Guaraní, Nacional and 3 de Febrero. He has also played abroad in Portugal, Chile and Colombia of which those clubs include Campomaiorense, Deportes Antofagasta and Once Caldas.

His last professional club was Deportivo Capiatá in 2015. However, he continued played football for clubs in the Unión del Fútbol del Interior until 2019. In 2022, he rejoined Sportivo Luqueño for the Copa Paraguay, where he served as assistant coach of Miguel Ángel Zahzú.

== Honours ==
- Paraguayan Primera División Torneo Apertura: 2007, 2010
- Paraguayan Primera División Torneo Apertura Top Scorer: 2007
- Paraguayan Primera División Torneo Clausura Top Scorer: 2009
