= Pablo Zeballos =

Paraguayan footballer (born 1986)

Pablo Daniel Zeballos
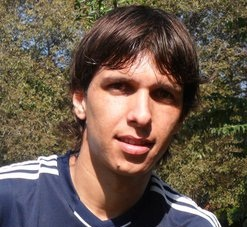
- Pablo Zeballos in 2011

Personal information
- Full name: Pablo Daniel Zeballos Ocampos
- Date of birth: 4 March 1986 (age 40)
- Place of birth: Vallemí, Paraguay
- Height: 1.80 m (5 ft 11 in)
- Position: Attacking midfielder

Youth career
- Sol de América

Senior career*
Years	Team	Apps	(Gls)
2005–2007	Sol de América	60	(31)
2006	→ Oriente Petrolero (loan)	14	(16)
2008–2010	Cruz Azul	53	(14)
2010	→ Cerro Porteño (loan)	44	(24)
2011–2012	Olimpia Asunción	62	(31)
2012–2014	Krylya Sovetov	19	(1)
2013	→ Emelec (loan)	12	(1)
2014	Botafogo	30	(6)
2015–2016	Atlético Nacional	9	(3)
2015	→ Olimpia Asunción (loan)	16	(8)
2016	→ Libertad (loan)	15	(1)
2016–2017	Sportivo Luqueño	23	(7)
2016	→ Al-Wakra (loan)	11	(4)
2017–2018	Sol de América	37	(10)
2018	Oriente Petrolero	24	(11)
2019	Royal Pari	13	(2)
2020	12 de Octubre	29	(13)
2021	River Plate Asunción	20	(5)
2022	Sportivo Ameliano	25	(4)

International career
2008–2012	Paraguay	9	(1)
- * Club domestic league appearances and goals as of 13 November 2022

Pablo Daniel Zeballos Ocampos (born 4 March 1986) is a Paraguayan football attacking midfielder. Zeballos represented the Paraguay national team from 2008 to 2012, featuring in the 2011 Copa América where Paraguay finished runners-up. In 2011, he was voted the Paraguayan Footballer of the Year.

== Career ==
=== Sol de América ===
Zeballos started his career in the youth divisions of Sol de América where he played alongside José Ortigoza. He made his debut in 2005 and helped the team to win the Paraguayan División Intermedia tournament by being the team's top-scorer. He is remembered for his goal against Club Cerro Corá at the last minute of the match.

==== Loan to Oriente Petrolero ====
In 2006, Zeballos was transferred to Bolivian club Oriente Petrolero on a six-month loan period, where he became the top-scorer with 16 goals in 14 league appearances and helped the team reach second position during the 2006 Liga de Fútbol Profesional Boliviano Torneo Clausura.

==== Return to Sol de América ====
Zeballos returned to Paraguay for the 2007 season and finished as the joint top goal scorer of the Primera Division top-scorer, along with Fabio Ramos of Club Nacional, with 15 goals.

=== Cruz Azul ===
His good form rewarded him with a transfer to Cruz Azul of Mexico. He debuted against San Luis F.C. in the Jornada 3 of the Clausura 2008, making his first goal in the Primera División de México one minute after being substituted in for Nicolás Vigneri. In the liguilla del futbol Mexicano he brought the team back up to beat Jaguares in quarter-finals and took them all the way to the final where they would lose.

On 15 November 2008, Zeballos scored his first "hat-trick" with Cruz Azul against Jaguares.

==== Loan to Cerro Porteño ====
In January 2010, Zeballos was loaned to Primera División Paraguaya club Cerro Porteño until 31 December 2010. With Cerro Porteño he won two second places and was top scorer of the Torneo Apertura with 16 goals along with Rodrigo Teixeira, and ended up being top scorer of the year with 24. On 12 December 2010, it was reported that former club Oriente Petrolero and various clubs from Bolivia's Liga de Fútbol Profesional had shown there interest in Zeballos.

=== Olimpia ===
At the end of that year, Zeballos signed a contract with rival of Cerro Porteno, Olimpia. Olimpia came up second during the Torneo Apertura 2011 with him as top scorer having scored 13 goals. On the next tournament of the year, Zeballos managed to win the Torneo Clausura with Olimpia, being the team's top scorer with 12 goals, one behind the tournament's top scorer Fredy Bareiro. With this record, Zeballos was top scorer of the 2011 season in Paraguay with a total of 25 goals, attracted on themselves the attention of Genoa and Cagliari.

=== Krylya Sovetov Samara ===
In the summer of 2012, Zeballos joined Russian Premier League side Krylia Sovetov Samara on a three-year contract. Zeballos made his debut for Krylya Sovetov in the 2012–13 Russian Premier League season in a 1–1 home draw against Terek Grozny on 22 July.

After 1 goal in 15 appearances in the first half of the season for Krylia Sovetov, Zeballos joined Ecuadorian side Emelec on a six-month loan deal till 30 June 2013, with the option of a permanent move.

=== Club Sport Emelec ===
He arrived to the Emelec, where he was loaned for a great sum of money, but only managed one goal during his time, for which he was criticized by the fans and the media that he wasn't worth the amount paid for. He left Emelec after just appearing in 17 games. Zeballos left Emelec to join Kyrlia again but this time with no success after long and exhausting negotiations during summer 2014 Zeballos returned to Club Olimpia, but by judicial problems he couldn't sign a contract and then started negotiations with Botafogo.

=== Botafogo ===
After a lot of negotiation Zeballos arrived at Rio de Janeiro to sign with Botafogo. He scored his first goal, of penalty, in a match of the Cariocão 2014 against Boavista.

=== Libertad ===
During December 2015, it had already been reported that Zeballos had a %99 chance of departing Olimpia. By 7 January 2016, it was announced that Zeballos had joined Club Libertad and the following day he had travelled to the city of Minga Guazú to join the club in their pre-season training.

=== River Plate Asunción ===
On 30 December 2020, it was confirmed that Zeballos signed with River Plate for the 2021 season, when the club would play in the Copa Sudamericana. Zaballos signed a two-year agreement.

== International career ==
On 29 February 2008, Zeballos was called up to the Paraguay national football team the first time for a friendly against Honduras. In June 2008, Zeballos was again called up to the national team for two 2010 FIFA World Cup qualification matches against Brazil and Bolivia. On 25 May 2011, Zeballos scored his first goal for Paraguay in a 4–2 away loss in a friendly against Argentina.

== Career statistics ==
=== Club ===
Club performance			League		Play-off		Cup		Continental		Total	
Season	Club	League	Apps	Goals	Apps	Goals	Apps	Goals	Apps	Goals	Apps	Goals
Mexico			League		Play-off		Copa MX		CONCACAF		Total	
2008-09	Cruz Azul	Liga MX	37	10	-				0	0	37	10
2009-10	Cruz Azul	Liga MX	8	1	-				8	5	16	6
Paraguay			League		Play-off		Cup		CONMEBOL		Total	
2010	Cerro Porteño (Loan)	División Profesional	44	24	-		-		6	0	50	24
2011	Olimpia	División Profesional	43	25	-		-		6	3	49	31
2012	Olimpia	División Profesional	19	6	-		-		5	3	24	9
Russia			League		Play-off		Russian Cup		Europe		Total	
2012–13	Krylya Sovetov	Russian Premier League	15	1	0	0	1	0	-		16	1
Ecuador			League		Play-off		Cup		CONMEBOL		Total	
2013	Emelec (Loan)	Primera Categoría Serie A	15	1	-		-		7	0	16	1
Russia			League		Play-off		Russian Cup		Europe		Total	
2013–14	Krylya Sovetov	Russian Premier League	0	0	-		0	0	-		0	0
Total	Mexico		45	11	-				8	5	83	19
Total	Paraguay		62	31	-		-		12	6	74	37
Total	Russia		15	1	0	0	1	0	-		16	1
Total	Ecuador		12	1	-		-		7	0	19	1
Career total			178	68	-		1	0	27	11	235	82

=== International goals ===
#	Date	Venue	Opponent	Score	Result	Competition
1.	25 May 2011	Estadio Centenario, Resistencia, Argentina	Argentina	1–1	4–2	Friendly

== Honours ==
=== Club ===
Sol de América

- División Intermedia: 2006

Olimpia

- Primera División: 2011 Clausura

Sportivo Ameliano

- Copa Paraguay: 2022

=== International ===
Paraguay

- Copa América runners-up: 2011

=== Individual ===
- Paraguayan Footballer of the Year: 2011
- Primera División de Paraguay topscorers: 2007 Torneo Apertura (15 goals), 2010 Torneo Apertura (16 goals)

== See also ==
- Players and Records in Paraguayan Football
