= Cristian Ledesma =

Cristian Ledesma may refer to:

- Cristian Ledesma (footballer, born 1978), Argentine football defensive midfielder
- Cristian Ledesma (footballer, born 1982), Italian football midfielder
- Cristian Ledesma (footballer, born 1987), Paraguayan football striker for Deportivo Quito

== See also ==
- Christian Ledesma (born 1976), Argentine racing driver
