= Torneo Apertura 2007 (Paraguay) =

Primera División
- Season: 2007 Apertura

The Torneo Apertura 2007 was the football (soccer) tournament that opened the season in the Paraguayan first division in the year 2007.

The tournament began on February 16 with the participation of 12 teams, with a two-legged all play all system. The winner was Sportivo Luqueño, which ended a drought of championships of 54 years.

By winning the Apertura, Luqueño also secured a spot for the Copa Libertadores 2008 and the right to play in the national championship final against the Clausura 2007 winner.

== Positions ==
Pos	Team	Pld	W	D	L	GF	GA	GD	Pts
1	Sportivo Luqueño	22	14	5	3	45	22	+23	47
2	Cerro Porteño	22	13	4	5	42	18	+24	43
3	Libertad	22	11	7	4	30	16	+14	40
4	Olimpia	22	10	8	4	29	21	+8	38
5	3 de Febrero	22	8	6	8	23	25	−2	30
6	Nacional	22	6	8	8	25	23	+2	26
7	Tacuary	22	7	5	10	20	32	−12	26
8	Sportivo Trinidense	22	6	6	10	24	39	−15	24
9	Sol de América	22	5	8	9	19	29	−10	23
10	12 de Octubre	22	6	5	11	27	38	−11	23
11	2 de Mayo	22	4	9	9	24	32	−8	21
12	Guaraní	22	3	7	12	26	39	−13	16

== Results ==
Matchday 1
Home team	Result	Away team
Sol de América	0 - 2	Libertad
12 de Octubre	1 - 1	2 de Mayo
Tacuary	2 - 0	3 de Febrero
Olimpia	1 - 1	Nacional
Cerro Porteño	1 - 0	Sportivo Luqueño
Sportivo Trinidense	3 - 2	Guaraní

Matchday 2
Home team	Result	Away team
2 de Mayo	0 - 1	Tacuary
Nacional	2 - 2	Sportivo Luqueño
Libertad	2 - 2	Olimpia
Guaraní	3 - 0	12 de Octubre
3 de Febrero	1 - 0	Sol de América
Sportivo Trinidense	0 - 3	Cerro Porteño

Matchday 3
Home team	Result	Away team
Cerro Porteño	3 - 1	Nacional
Tacuary	0 - 0	Guaraní
Sol de América	1 - 1	2 de Mayo
Olimpia	2 - 2	3 de Febrero
12 de Octubre	1 - 1	Sportivo Trinidense
Sportivo Luqueño	0 - 1	Libertad

Matchday 4
Home team	Result	Away team
2 de Mayo	3 - 1	Olimpia
Sportivo Trinidense	0 - 2	Tacuary
3 de Febrero	1 - 1	Sportivo Luqueño
Guarani	1 - 2	Sol de América
Libertad	1 - 1	Nacional
12 de Octubre	0 - 2	Cerro Porteño

Matchday 5
Home team	Result	Away team
Tacuary	1 - 3	12 de Octubre
Nacional	0 - 1	3 de Febrero
Sportivo Luqueño	2 - 0	2 de Mayo
Olimpia	3 - 1	Guarani
Sol de América	3 - 3	Sportivo Trinidense
Cerro Porteño	1 - 2	Libertad

Matchday 6
Home team	Result	Away team
Sportivo Trinidense	1 - 0	Olimpia
2 de Mayo	1 - 4	Nacional
Tacuary	1 - 4	Cerro Porteño
12 de Octubre	2 - 1	Sol de América
Guarani	2 - 2	Sportivo Luqueño
3 de Febrero	1 - 0	Libertad

Matchday 7
Home team	Result	Away team
Cerro Porteño	3 - 1	3 de Febrero
Libertad	3 - 0	2 de Mayo
Nacional	0 - 0	Guarani
Sportivo Luqueño	4 - 3	Sportivo Trinidense
Olimpia	3 - 2	12 de Octubre
Sol de América	1 - 1	Tacuary

Matchday 8
Home team	Result	Away team
Sol de América	0 - 6	Cerro Porteño
Guarani	1 - 1	Libertad
Tacuary	0 - 1	Olimpia
12 de Octubre	1 - 2	Sportivo Luqueño
Sportivo Trinidense	2 - 2	Nacional
2 de Mayo	0 - 0	3 de Febrero

Matchday 9
Home team	Result	Away team
Libertad	4 - 0	Sportivo Trinidense
Nacional	1 - 0	12 de Octubre
Cerro Porteño	1 - 2	2 de Mayo
3 de Febrero	2 - 1	Guaraní
Sportivo Luqueño	2 - 0	Tacuary
Olimpia	1 - 0	Sol de América

Matchday 10
Home team	Result	Away team
Tacuary	1 - 0	Nacional
Olimpia	0 - 1	Cerro Porteño
Sportivo Trinidense	2 - 2	3 de Febrero
Sol de América	2 - 4	Sportivo Luqueño
12 de Octubre	3 - 3	Libertad
Guarani	3 - 3	2 de Mayo

Matchday 11
Home team	Result	Away team
Libertad	2 - 0	Tacuary
Cerro Porteño	2 - 1	Guarani
Nacional	1 - 0	Sol de América
2 de Mayo	3 - 0	Sportivo Trinidense
3 de Febrero	1 - 2	12 de Octubre
Sportivo Luqueño	2 - 2	Olimpia

Matchday 12
Home team	Result	Away team
Nacional	0 - 1	Olimpia
2 de Mayo	2 - 1	12 de Octubre
3 de Febrero	4 - 1	Tacuary
Guaraní	0 - 2	Sportivo Trinidense
Libertad	0 - 0	Sol de América
Sportivo Luqueño	3 - 2	Cerro Porteño

Matchday 13
Home team	Result	Away team
Tacuary	1 - 0	2 de Mayo
Sportivo Luqueño	2 - 1	Nacional
Sol de América	0 - 0	3 de Febrero
12 Octubre	2 - 1	Guaraní
Cerro Porteño	1 - 0	Sportivo Trinidense
Olimpia	0 - 1	Libertad

Matchday 14
Home team	Result	Away team
2 de Mayo	1 - 2	Sol de América
Sportivo Trinidense	1 - 0	12 de Octubre
3 de Febrero	0 - 1	Olimpia
Guaraní	1 - 0	Tacuary
Nacional	1 - 1	Cerro Porteño
Libertad	0 - 2	Sportivo Luqueño

Matchday 15
Home team	Result	Away team
Sol de América	0 - 2	Guaraní
Tacuary	1 - 1	Sportivo Trinidense
Sportivo Luqueño	2 - 0	3 de Febrero
Cerro Porteño	0 - 2	12 de Octubre
Olimpia	3 - 1	2 de Mayo
Nacional	0 - 1	Libertad

Matchday 16
Home team	Result	Away team
2 de Mayo	1 - 2	Sportivo Luqueño
Libertad	0 - 1	Cerro Porteño
Guaraní	1 - 2	Olimpia
3 de Febrero	1 - 0	Nacional
Sportivo Trinidense	1 - 1	Sol de América
12 de Octubre	1 - 1	Tacuary

Matchday 17
Home team	Result	Away team
Olimpia	3 - 1	Sportivo Trinidense
Sol de América	3 - 0	12 de Octubre
Sportivo Luqueño	3 - 0	Guaraní
Nacional	2 - 2	2 de Mayo
Libertad	2 - 1	3 de Febrero
Cerro Porteño	6 - 1	Tacuary

Matchday 18
Home team	Result	Away team
Tacuary	0 - 1	Sol de América
3 de Febrero	1 - 0	Cerro Porteño
Guaraní	0 - 3	Nacional
Sportivo Trinidense	0 - 4	Sportivo Luqueño
2 de Mayo	0 - 0	Libertad
12 de Octubre	0 - 0	Olimpia

Matchday 19
Home team	Result	Away team
Nacional	2 - 1	Sportivo Trinidense
Sportivo Luqueño	4 - 1	12 de Octubre
3 de Febrero	0 - 0	2 de Mayo
Olimpia	2 - 2	Tacuary
Libertad	0 - 0	Guaraní
Cerro Porteño	0 - 0	Sol de América

Matchday 20
Home team	Result	Away team
2 de Mayo	0 - 0	Cerro Porteño
Sol de América	0 - 1	Olimpia
Tacuary	0 - 1	Sportivo Luqueño
12 de Octubre	0 - 2	Nacional
Sportivo Trinidense	0 - 1	Libertad
Guaraní	1 - 2	3 de Febrero

Matchday 21
Home team	Result	Away team
2 de Mayo	3 - 3	Guaraní
Nacional	1 - 2	Tacuary
Cerro Porteño	0 - 0	Olimpia
3 de Febrero	0 - 1	Sportivo Trinidense
Sportivo Luqueño	1 - 2	Sol de América
Libertad	3 - 1	12 de Octubre

Matchday 22
Home team	Result	Away team
Olimpia	0 - 0	Sportivo Luqueño
Sol de América	0 - 0	Nacional
Tacuary	2 - 1	Libertad
12 de Octubre	4 - 2	3 de Febrero
Sportivo Trinidense	1 - 0	2 de Mayo
Guaraní	2 - 4	Cerro Porteño

== Top scorers ==
Player		Goals	Team
Paraguay	César Cáceres Cañete	13	Sportivo Luqueño
Paraguay	Alejandro Da Silva	10	Cerro Porteño
Paraguay	Cristian Ledesma	10	Olimpia
Paraguay	Fabio Ramos	10	Nacional
Colombia	Mauricio Molina	9	Olimpia
Paraguay	Jorge Núñez	8	Sportivo Luqueño
Argentina	Maximiliano Biancucchi	8	Sportivo Luqueño
Uruguay	Rodrigo López	8	Libertad

== See also ==
- 2007 in Paraguayan football
