= Vladimir Marín =

Colombian footballer (born 1979)

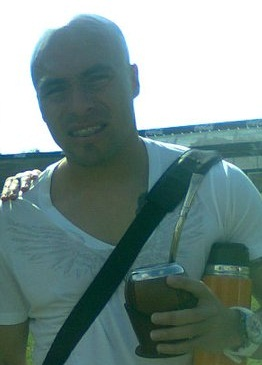

Personal information
- Full name: Vladimir Marín Ríos
- Date of birth: 26 September 1979 (age 47)
- Place of birth: Rionegro, Colombia
- Height: 1.63 m (5 ft 4 in)
- Position: Attacking midfielder

Team information
- Current team: Obreros Unidos

Senior career*
Years	Team	Apps	(Gls)
1998–2000	Deportivo Rionegro	43	(3)
2001–2004	Jorge Wilstermann	122	(19)
2005	Atlético Paranaense	11	(0)
2006	Independiente	12	(1)
2006	Atlético Nacional	19	(1)
2007–2010	Libertad	65	(26)
2009–2010	→ Toluca (loan)	37	(2)
2011–2012	Olimpia Asunción	53	(12)
2012–2014	Deportivo Cali	68	(11)
2014–2015	Independiente Medellin	38	(4)
2015	Águilas Doradas	15	(1)
2016–2017	Sportivo Luqueño	58	(11)
2018	Sportivo Trinidense	?	(?)
2018–2019	General Caballero Benín Loma		
2019	Athletic FBC		
2020	Mariscal Estigarribia		
2021	General Caballero CG		
2021–	Obreros Unidos		

International career
2006–2009	Colombia	14	(1)

Managerial career
- 2017: Sportivo Luqueño U18 (women)
- 2018: Paraguay (women)
- * Club domestic league appearances and goals as of 2021

Vladimir Marín Ríos (born 26 September 1979) is a Colombian football attacking midfielder and coach. He plays for Obreros Unidos in the Liga Hernandariense. He represented Colombia from 2006 to 2009.

== Club career ==
Marín began his playing career with local club, Deportivo Rionegro, before joining Bolivian side Jorge Wilstermann for four seasons. Then he moved to Clube Atlético Paranaense where he played for a year, before returning to Colombia to play for Atlético Nacional. Marín had a brief spell in the Argentine Primera with Club Atlético Independiente before transferring to Paraguay's Club Libertad in January 2007. In 2009, Marín was loaned to Toluca of Mexico where he won the Bicentenario 2010 league title.

=== Return to Paraguayan League ===
==== 2016–2022: Primera División and Lower Leagues ====
In the 2018 División Intermedia season, Marin appeared for Sportivo Trinidense, with colleagues as Arístides Florentín, Claudio Centurion, Arturo Aquino, Eduardo Aveiro, Blas Irala, Jorge Achucarro, Gerardo Fleitas and South Korean Jang Hee-mang.

In October 2018, Marin signed with General Caballero Carapeguá for the 2018/19 Liga Carapegüeña. In November 2018, Marin debuted as captain for General Caballero Benín Loma in a 1–1 draw with Olimpia in the Liga Carapegüeña. In the team as well was Adalberto Gonzalez and Arístides Florentín. Marin's contract ran for the duration of the championship.

In January 2019, ABC Color announced that Marin signed with Encarnación team Athletic FBC to dispute the 2019 Primera B Nacional. He would summon to the pre-season works afterwards, due to commitments with his club from the Liga Carapegüeña, which was still in competition at the time.

In 2020, Marin joined Pedro Juan Caballero team Mariscal Estigarribia to play the 2020 Copa Paraguay.

In 2021, Marin joined General Caballero CG in the Paraguay's Primera C, scoring an olympic goal in September.

In November 2021, Marin joined Club Obreros Unidos from the Liga Hernandariense.

== International career ==
In the 2007 Copa América in Venezuela, Marín was substituted onto the field in the 63rd minute for Javier Arizala in a 5–0 group stage defeat against Paraguay.

Marín made several appearances for the Colombia national football team, including four qualifying matches for the 2010 FIFA World Cup. On 6 June 2009, Marín was yellow carded in a 1–0 away defeat against Argentina in a World Cup qualification game.

On 15 October 2009, Marín played his last game for Colombia in a 2–0 away victory against Paraguay in a World Cup qualification game.

== Coaching career ==
In 2017, Marin exercised the Technical Direction of Sportivo Luqueño under-18 female team as league champions. The championship game was decided in a 4–3 penalty shoot out victory against Olimpia Asunción following a 3–3 draw during the 90 minutes of reglumentary time.

In January 2018, Marin was officially presented as Paraguay's women national team coach.

== Personal life ==
=== Family and relationships ===
Marin's wife, Milena Narváez, who is the president of Sportivo Luqueño's Women's Team. In 2017, Marin's daughter, Maria Isabel Marín Narváez, was part of the Sportivo Luqueño U18 team when he was the coach.

== See also ==
- List of expatriate footballers in Paraguay
- Players and Records in Paraguayan Football
