= Daniel Vázquez Díaz =

Spanish artist

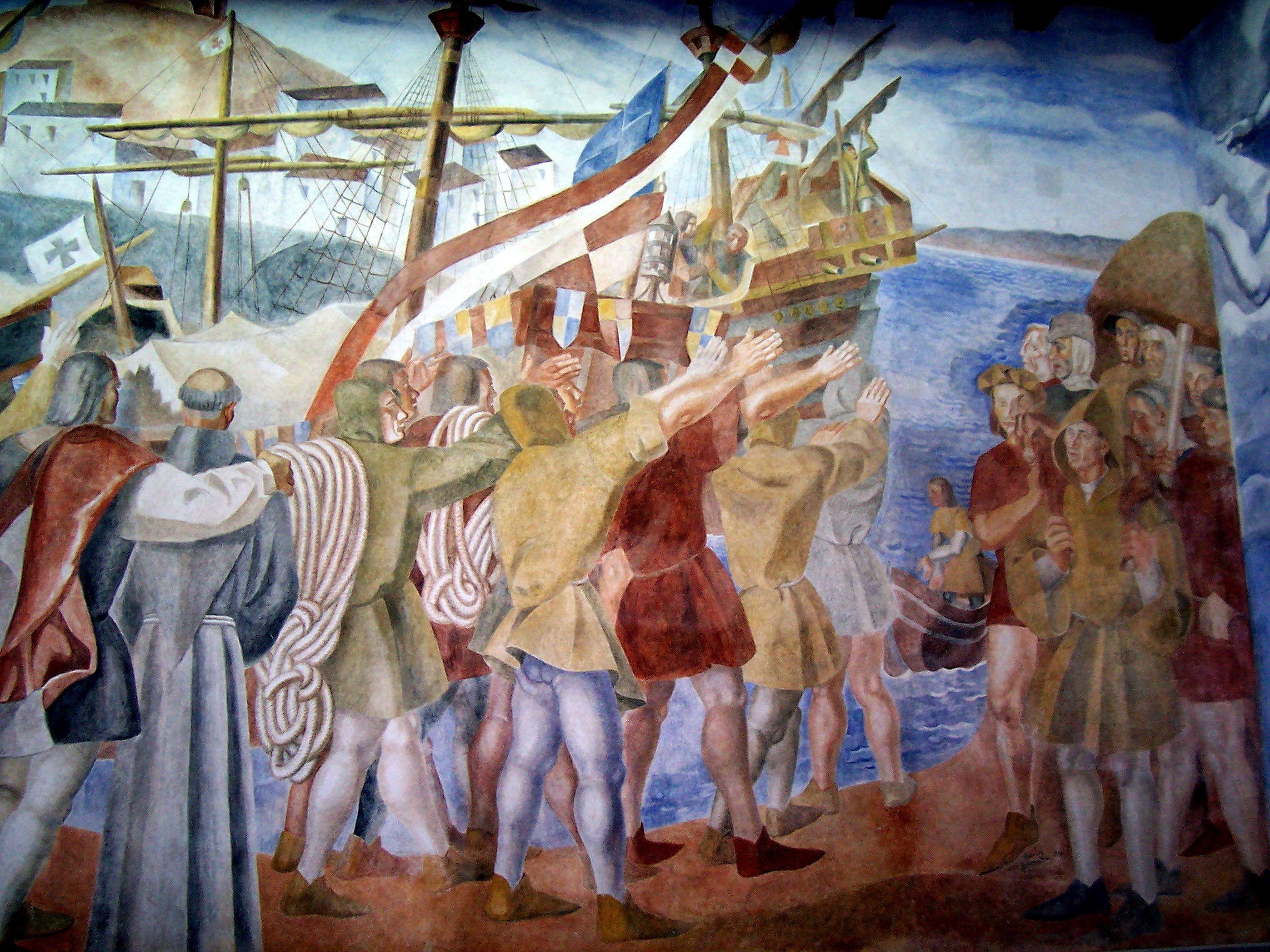
Frescos in La Rabida Monastery, Palos de la Frontera.

Daniel Vázquez Díaz (January 15, 1882 – March 17, 1969) was a Spanish painter.

== Biography ==
Born in Nerva, Spain, Vázquez Díaz settled in Paris in 1918, where he found cubism to be the ideal form of expression. Unlike other artists such as Juan Gris, he was not an intellectual cubist; he used external forms and the morphology of cubism to redo his language, characterized by the use of sober and gray colors, and by the vigor of his planes.

These characteristics give a special solemnity to his works, considered by some authors to be in the style of Zurbarán, and also similar to those of his compatriot, friend and contemporary Eugenio Hermoso, with whom he made his first studies in Seville and in Madrid. Among his works are the portraits of outstanding artists and Spanish intellectuals of the 20th century, such as Unamuno, as well as the frescos that he painted in the La Rabida Monastery in 1930, dedicated to Christopher Columbus and his relationship with his native province.

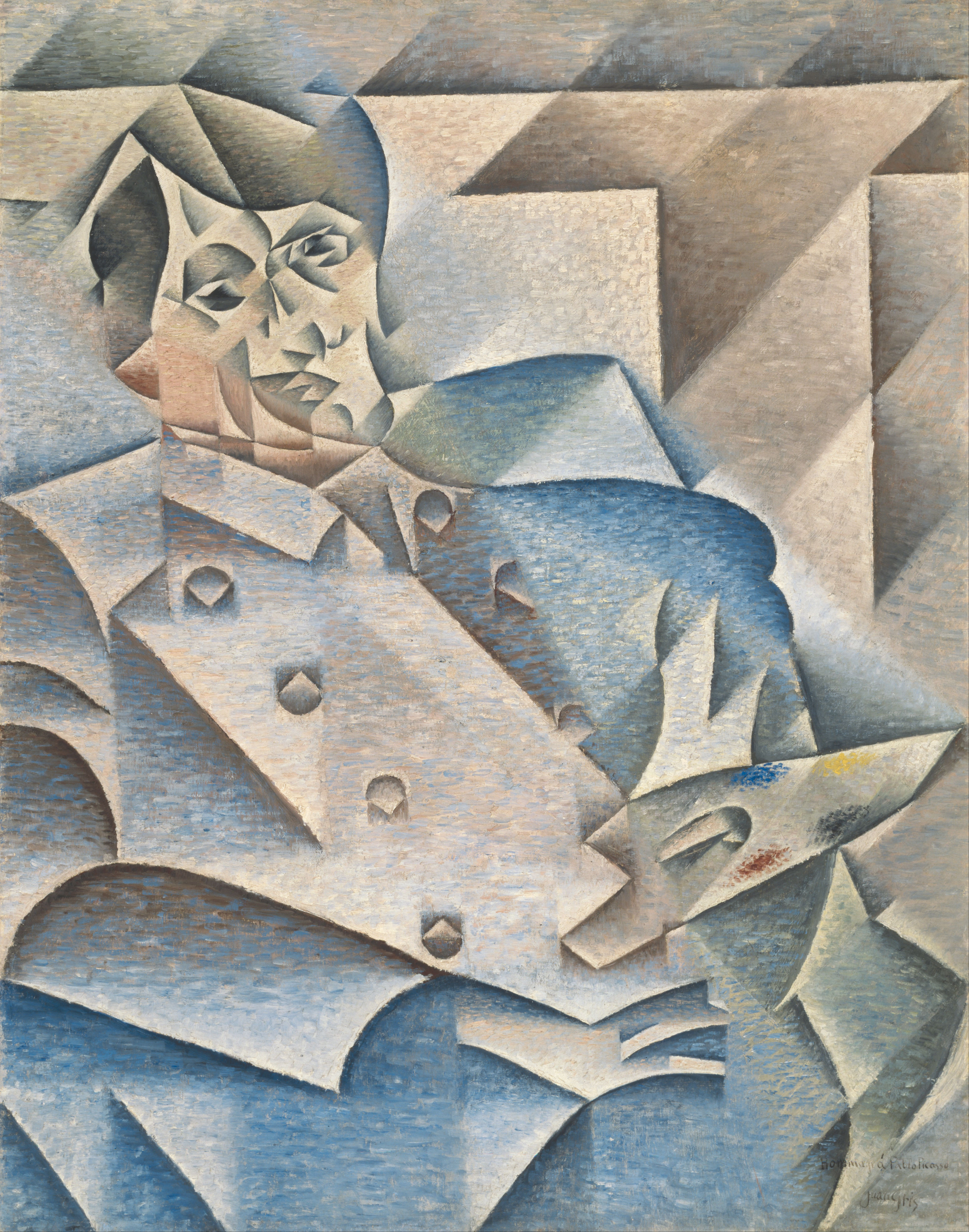
Picasso (1912), by Juan Gris

As a professor of mural painting in Madrid, Vázquez Díaz had among his students Salvador Dalí, Jorge Gallardo and Modesto Ciruelos. After the Spanish Civil War, he continued teaching such artists as Rafael Canogar, Agustín Ibarrola and Aarón Piña Mora.

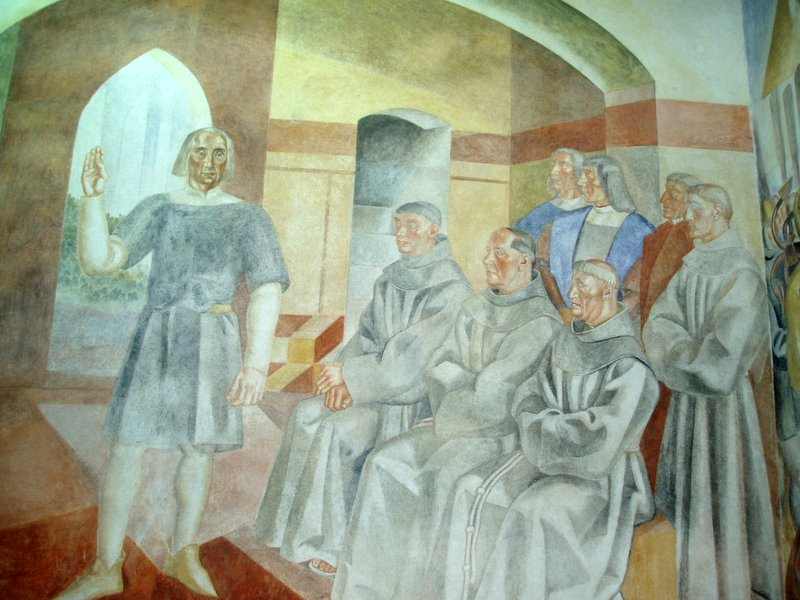
Cristóbal Colón (1930), by Daniel Vázquez Díaz.

Díaz's paintings are showcased at the Museo de Arte Contemporáneo in Madrid. His work was also part of the painting event in the art competition at the 1948 Summer Olympics.
