= Sergio Escalante =

Argentine footballer

Personal information
- Full name: Sergio Gustavo Escalante
- Date of birth: 9 March 1986 (age 40)
- Place of birth: Rosario, Santa Fe, Argentina
- Height: 1.74 m (5 ft 9 in)
- Position: Midfielder

Senior career*
Years	Team	Apps	(Gls)
1998–1999	Argentino de Rosario	1	(0)
2004–2008	Temperley	50	(2)
2006	→ Tristán Suárez (loan)	12	(1)
2009	Nikkei Bellmare		
2010	Coquimbo Unido	4	(1)
2010–2013	Sportivo Luqueño	38	(7)
2011	→ 3 de Febrero (loan)	10	(1)
2012–2013	→ Sol de América (loan)	51	(10)
2014	3 de Febrero	10	(1)
2014	Rubio Ñu	12	(2)
2015	Deportivo Azogues	9	(2)
2015–2016	Sportivo San Lorenzo	1	(0)
2016	Caacupé FBC		
2017	Sportivo Trinidense	6	(0)
2017	Laguna Blanca		
2018	Deportivo Caaguazú		
2019	Sportivo Ameliano		
- * Club domestic league appearances and goals

Sergio Gustavo Escalante (born 9 March 1986) is an Argentine former professional footballer who played as a midfielder.

== Early life ==
Escalante was born in Florencio Varela in the Buenos Aires Province.

== Career ==
=== Early career ===
Escalante came through the Newell's Old Boys youth system. Later, Escalante continued his career at Argentino de Rosario.

=== 2007 ===
In 2007, Escalante formed part of Argentine team Temperley's roster with colleagues as goalkeeper Federico Crivelli, and Rodrigo Salomón, Mauro Navas, Cristian Revainera and Fernando Pasquinelli.

=== 2009 ===
In May 2009, Escalante scored a double for Japanese founded club Nikkei Bellmare in a 3–1 home victory against River Plate Asunción in the Primera C. His goals were noted in the 24th and 34th minute. Weeks later, he netted another double in a 4–1 away victory against Deportivo Recoleta, placing Nikkei Bellmare in second place of the Primera C. His goals were noted in the 6th and 45th minute.

=== 2010 ===
In 2010, Escalante joined Sportivo Luqueño on loan from Nikkei Belmare. In July 2010, Escalante's transfer was registered at Sportivo Luqueño from Chilean club Coquimbo Unido. On 1 August 2010, Escalante debuted in the Primera División Paraguaya for Sportivo Luqueño in a 3–0 home defeat against Guaraní. Escalante entered the field in the 82nd minute for Hugo Lusardi. On 21 August 2010, Escalante scored his first goal for Sportivo Luqueño in a 2–2 away draw against Rubio Ñu, noting his goal in the 86th minute to equalise the game 2–2. On 5 December 2010, Escalante played in his last game for the 2010 season in a 1–1 home draw against Sol de América, playing in 65 minutes of the game.

=== 2011 ===
In June 2011, Escalante joined Ciudad del Este team 3 de Febrero from Sportivo Luqueño.

=== 2012 ===
In May 2012, D10 reported that Escalante would be loaned for six months to Liga MX club Atlante, when its club president José García and coach Ricardo Lavolpe travelled to Paraguay to observe Paraguayan striker José Ortigoza but instead were interested in Escalante.

=== 2021 ===
Escalante featured for Sportivo Ameliano in the 2021 season.

== Teams ==
- (Argentina) Argentino de Rosario 1998–2003
- (Argentina) Temperley 2004–2005
- (Argentina) Tristán Suárez 2006
- (Argentina) Temperley 2006–2009
- (Paraguay) Nikkei Bellmare (2009)
- (Chile) Coquimbo Unido 2010
- (Paraguay) Sportivo Luqueño 2010–2013
- (Paraguay) 3 de Febrero 2011
- (Paraguay) Sol de América 2012–2013
- (Paraguay) 3 de Febrero 2014
- (Paraguay) Rubio Ñu 2014–2015
- (Ecuador) Deportivo Azogues 2015
- (Paraguay) Caacupé FBC 2016
- (Paraguay) Sportivo Trinidense 2017
- (Argentina) Laguna Blanca 2017
- (Paraguay) Deportivo Caaguazú 2018
- (Paraguay) Sportivo Ameliano 2019–2020-2021-2022

== See also ==
- List of expatriate footballers in Paraguay
- Players and Records in Paraguayan Football
