= Miguel Ángel Zahzú =

Argentine football manager

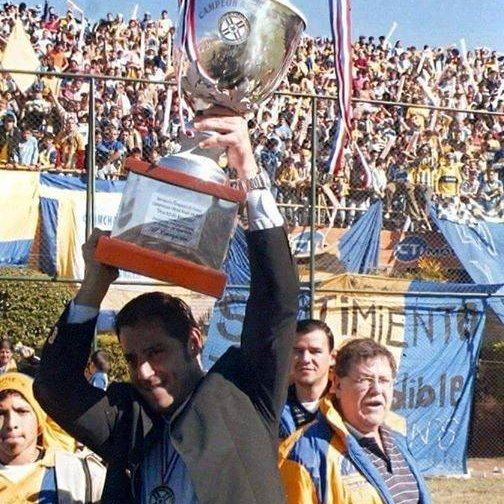
- Zahzú in 2007

Personal information
- Full name: Miguel Ángel Zahzú
- Date of birth: 24 February 1966 (age 60)
- Place of birth: Morón, Argentina
- Height: 1.87 m (6 ft 2 in)
- Position: Goalkeeper

Youth career
- Vélez Sarsfield

Senior career*
Years	Team	Apps	(Gls)
1987–1988	Atlético Lugano		
1988–1989	Midland	38	(0)
1989–1990	San Telmo		
1990–1991	Nueva Chicago		
1991–1993	Laferrere		
1994	Cobreloa		
1994–1995	Colegiales		
1995	Argentino de General Pico		
1995–1996	Laferrere		
1996–1997	Lamadrid	7	(0)
1997–2000	Laferrere		

Managerial career
- 2001–2002: Midland
- 2002–2003: Almirante Brown
- 2003: Nacional Asunción
- 2004: River Plate Asunción
- 2005: General Caballero ZC
- 2005–2007: Sportivo Luqueño
- 2007: Guaraní
- 2008: Aucas
- 2008: 3 de Febrero
- 2009: Sportivo Luqueño
- 2010: 2 de Mayo
- 2010: Cerro Corá
- 2010: Sportivo Trinidense
- 2011: 12 de Octubre
- 2012: Sportivo Carapeguá
- 2012: Colegiales
- 2014: Aurora
- 2014: San José
- 2015: Nacional Potosí
- 2016: Deportivo Coopsol
- 2016: Guaraní Antonio Franco
- 2016: Defensor La Bocana
- 2017: Atlántico
- 2018: Aurora
- 2018: Moca
- 2019: Atlántico
- 2020: Atlético Chiriquí
- 2020: Delfín
- 2021: Carlos Stein
- 2021–2022: Sportivo Luqueño
- 2023: Resistencia
- 2023: Real Santa Cruz
- 2026: GV San José
- 2026: UTC
- * Club domestic league appearances and goals

Miguel Ángel Zahzú (born 24 February 1966) is an Argentine football manager and former player who played as a goalkeeper.

== Playing career ==
Born in Morón, Buenos Aires, Zahzú was a Vélez Sarsfield youth graduate, but never played for the club's first team. As a senior, he represented Atlético Lugano, Midland, San Telmo, Nueva Chicago, Laferrere, Colegiales, Argentino de General Pico and Lamadrid aside from a short period abroad with Chilean club Cobreloa.

== Managerial career ==
After retiring, Zahzú worked as manager of Midland and Almirante Brown before joining Paraguayan side Nacional Asunción in 2003. He resigned from the latter in September of that year, but the club still won the División Intermedia.

On 23 April 2004, Zahzú took over River Plate Asunción also in the second division. On 30 October of that year, he was appointed General Caballero ZC manager, for the club's return to the Primera División.

On 8 November 2005, Zahzú replaced Hugo González at the helm of Sportivo Luqueño. On 7 July 2007, after winning the Apertura tournament, he was named in charge of Guaraní.

Despite being kept as manager of Guaraní for the 2008 season, Zahzú moved to Ecuador on 12 January of that year, after being appointed manager of Aucas. He left on a mutual agreement on 20 May, and returned to Paraguay on 2 July, to take over 3 de Febrero.

On 10 December 2008, Zahzú returned to Luqueño for the upcoming season, but resigned the following 13 June. During the 2010 season, he worked at 2 de Mayo, Cerro Corá and Sportivo Trinidense.

After managing Paraguayan sides 12 de Octubre, Sportivo Carapeguá and Colegiales, Zahzú was appointed at Bolivian side Aurora for the 2014 campaign. After working at fellow league teams San José and Nacional Potosí in the following years, he moved to Peru in 2016 with Deportivo Coopsol, before returning to his home country with Guaraní Antonio Franco.

Zahzú returned to Peru still in 2016, with Defensor La Bocana, but switched teams and countries again after taking over Dominican club Atlántico for the 2017 season. He returned to Aurora on 16 October 2017, but resigned the following 16 April.

In August 2018, Zahzú returned to the Dominican Republic, after being named Moca manager. He returned to Atlántico for the 2019 campaign, and was later in charge of Atlético Chiriquí also in the country.

On 4 September 2020, Zahzú was appointed at the helm of Delfín. Sacked on 3 December, he took over Carlos Stein in Peru eleven days later, but was still sacked on 31 May 2021.

Zahzú returned to Luqueño on 8 December 2021, with the club in the relegation play-offs. Despite suffering relegation, he remained at the club and helped them to return to the top tier at first attempt, but resigned on 23 October 2022.

On 24 November 2022, Zahzú was appointed manager of Resistencia in the Paraguayan top tier. He resigned the following 6 March, after just six matches, and took over Real Santa Cruz in Bolivia on 23 August 2023; he left the latter in December, with his contract being due to expire.

After nearly three years without a club, Zahzú returned to Bolivia to take over GV San José on 10 September 2026, but resigned eleven days later. On 5 October, he returned to Peru to take over UTC, but left the club two days later.

== Honours ==
=== Manager ===
Nacional Asunción

- División Intermedia: 2003

Sportivo Luqueño

- Paraguayan Primera División: 2007 Apertura
