= Ignacio Rolón =

Paraguayan footballer (born 1974)

Personal information
- Full name: Ignacio Daniel Rolón
- Date of birth: November 23, 1974 (age 51)
- Place of birth: San Antonio, Paraguay
- Height: 1.81 m (5 ft 11 in)
- Position: Defender

Senior career*
Years	Team	Apps	(Gls)
1993–1997	Nacional		
1998–1999	Sportivo Luqueño		
2000–2001	Atlético Colegiales	8	(0)
2002–2005	12 de Octubre	92	(1)
2005	Deportes La Serena	16	(2)
2006	12 de Octubre	20	(0)
2006–2007	Olimpia	38	(0)
2008	12 de Octubre	0	(0)
2008	The Strongest	30	(1)
2009	General Díaz	3	(0)

International career
- Paraguay U17
- Paraguay U20
- Paraguay U23
- * Club domestic league appearances and goals

Ignacio Daniel Rolón Samaniego (born 23 November 1974 in San Antonio, Paraguay) is a Paraguayan former footballer who played as a defender.

== Teams ==
- (Paraguay) Nacional 1993–1997
- (Paraguay) Sportivo Luqueño 1998–1999
- (Paraguay) Atlético Colegiales 2000–2001
- (Paraguay) 12 de Octubre 2002–2005
- (Chile) Deportes La Serena 2005
- (Paraguay) 12 de Octubre 2006
- (Paraguay) Olimpia 2006–2007
- (Paraguay) 12 de Octubre 2008
- (Bolivia) The Strongest 2008
- (Paraguay) General Díaz 2009

== International ==
Rolón represented Paraguay at youth levels and also was called up to the squad for the friendly match against Spain on 17 October 2002.

== Personal life ==
Rolón is nicknamed Chumpitaz after the Peruvian former international footballer Héctor Chumpitaz.
