= Pablo Silva =

Uruguayan footballer (born 1984)

Personal information
- Full name: Pablo Martin Silva
- Date of birth: 6 November 1984 (age 42)
- Place of birth: Montevideo, Uruguay
- Height: 1.79 m (5 ft 10 in)
- Position: Forward

Team information
- Current team: La Luz

Youth career
- Quilmes de Florida
- Basáñez
- Villa Española
- 2007: Danubio

Senior career*
Years	Team	Apps	(Gls)
2003–2004	Villa Española		
2005–2006	Rentistas	23	(1)
2008–2009	Huracán Buceo	20	(2)
2010	Nikkei Bellmare		
2011	Boston River	6	(1)
2011–2012	Deportivo Maldonado	20	(9)
2012–2013	Sud América	16	(3)
2013–2014	Villa Española		
2014–2015	Trinidad	7	(1)
2015–2016	Villa Española	27	(12)
2017	Comunicaciones	17	(4)
2017	Danubio	11	(1)
2018	Villa Española	11	(5)
2020–2021	Villa Española	41	(10)
2022–	La Luz	19	(3)
- * Club domestic league appearances and goals as of 18:43, 8 December 2022 (UTC)

Pablo Martin Silva (born 6 November 1984) is a Uruguayan professional footballer who plays as a forward for La Luz.

== Career ==
In 2005, Silva signed for Uruguayan top flight side Rentistas, where he suffered a broken metatarsal.

In 2008, he signed for Huracán Buceo in the Uruguayan lower leagues, but was owed money due to them going bankrupt, before joining Paraguayan lower league club Nikkei Bellmare.

In 2013, he signed for Villa Española in the Uruguayan third division, before joining Argentine fourth division team Trinidad.

Before the 2017 season, Silva signed for Comunicaciones in Guatemala.

In 2017, he signed for Uruguayan top flight outfit Danubio, where he made 11 league appearances and scored 1 goal.

Before the 2018 season, Silva returned to Villa Española in the Uruguayan second division, where he made 11 league appearances and scored 5 goals.
