= Club Nikkei Bellmare =

Paraguayan football club

Nikkei Bellmare
- Full name: Club Nikkei Bellmare
- Founded: 12 July 2006
- Ground: Estadio Nikkei Bellmare
- Capacity: 3, 000
- Chairman: Casiano Delvalle
- League: Primera C
Home colours	Away colours

Club Nikkei Bellmare is a Paraguayan football club based in the city of Itauguá. The club was founded 12 July 2006 by the SEA Global Corporation of Japan and the Sakura Group. The club plays in the Primera C and their stadium has a capacity for 3, 000 people. The club is supported by Japanese enterprises and acts as a feeder club to other clubs in Japan.

== History ==
In October 2006, the club inaugurated its modern facility at the Compañía Guazú Virá in the city of Itaguá. The club was inaugurated in a presentation which held the presence of Kiyoshi Makabe, president of Japanese club Shonan Bellmare, and Naohito Mizutani from the SEA Global company, the sponsor of Nikkei Bellmare. The club's squad first began training under the order of Nelson Zacarias to first play in the Liga Itaugüeña and then onto the competitions of the Asociación Paraguaya de Fútbol.

In the club's foundation years, Nikkei Bellmare played in the Liga Itagüeño and the country's regional leagues. In 2008, the club achieved a historic promotion to the Asociación Paraguaya de Fútbol's Primera C, belonging there until the 2012 season.

In 2018, businessman and former footballer Casiano Delvalle began the process for Nikkei Bellmare to return to the Primera C. He purchased the club, and renovated the infrustracture in time to open an academy. Working closely with the club as well was former Club Cerro Porteño footballer Alfredo Gonzalez.

== Notable players ==
To appear in this section a player must have either:

- Played at least 125 games for the club.
- Set a club record or won an individual award while at the club.
- Been part of a national team squad at any time.
- Played in the first division of any other football association (outside of Paraguay).
- Played in a continental and/or intercontinental competition.

2000's

- (Uruguay) Pablo Silva (--)
- (Argentina) Sergio Escalante (2009--?)
