= List of newspapers in Paraguay =

This is a list of newspapers in Paraguay.

== Current newspapers ==
- ABC Color (Asunción)
- Extra (Asunción)
- Itapúa Notícias (Encarnación)
- La Nación (Asunción)
- Popular (Asunción)
- La Tribuna (Asunción)
- The Asunción Times (Asunción)
- Última Hora (Asunción)
- Vanguardia (Ciudad del Este)

== Defunct newspapers ==
- El Cabichuí (1867–1868)
- El Debate (1937-?)
- La Regeneración (1869–1870)
- Sendero (1973–1992)

== See also ==
- List of newspapers
