= Mario Villasanti =

Paraguayan footballer (born 1982)

Personal information
- Full name: Mario Eduardo Villasanti Adorno
- Date of birth: 2 July 1982 (age 44)
- Place of birth: Fernando de la Mora, Paraguay
- Height: 1.80 m (5 ft 11 in)
- Position: Goalkeeper

Senior career*
Years	Team	Apps	(Gls)
2003–2005	Tacuary	3	(0)
2005–2006	Fernando de la Mora	15	(0)
2006	Sportivo Iteño	0	(0)
2007	Sportivo Luqueño		
2008	Audax Italiano	18	(0)
2009–2011	Sportivo Luqueño	70	(0)
2012–2014	Inti Gas	116	(1)
2015–2017	Ayacucho FC	118	(8)
2018	Cienciano	31	(0)
- * Club domestic league appearances and goals

Mario Eduardo Villasanti Adorno (born 2 July 1982) is a Paraguayan former footballer who played as a goalkeeper.

== Club career ==
Villasanti made his professional debut for Paraguayan club Tacuary in 2003. He also played for Fernando de la Mora, Sportivo Iteño, and Sportivo Luqueño all clubs in Paraguay. At the end of 2007, Villasanti was named by the Paraguayan newspaper Última Hora as best player of the year. He played for Sportivo Luqueño. Villasanti was the first goalkeeper and first player not to play for Cerro Porteño to win the award, which has existed since 2004. In January 2008, he was signed by Audax Italiano to replace Nicolás Peric as the team's starting goalkeeper. He returned to Sportivo Luqueño in 2009 until 2011.

In January 2012, he signed with Rubio Ñu, but he switched to Inti Gas in the same month.

His last club was Cienciano in the Peruvian second level.

== International career ==
In October 2011, he was called up to the Paraguay national team under Francisco Arce for the 2014 FIFA World Cup qualifiers.

== Personal life ==
Villasanti graduated as a lawyer.

Villasanti naturalized Peruvian by residence after playing for Ayacucho FC.
