= Victor Quintana =

Paraguayan footballer (born 1976)

Víctor Quintana
Personal information
- Full name: Victor Quintana
- Date of birth: 12 April 1976 (age 50)
- Place of birth: Misiones, Paraguay
- Position: Midfielder

Youth career
- San Miguel (Misiones)

Senior career*
Years	Team	Apps	(Gls)
1996–1997	San Miguel (Misiones)	–	(–)
1998–2001	Olimpia	–	(–)
2001–2002	F.C. Porto	–	(–)
2002	Olimpia	–	(–)
2002	Cruzeiro	–	(–)
2003	Moreirense F.C.	–	(–)
2004	Olimpia	–	(–)
2005	Nacional	–	(–)
2006–2007	Olimpia	–	(–)
2008	Sportivo Luqueño	–	(–)
- * Club domestic league appearances and goals

Victor Quintana (born 12 April 1976) is a retired Paraguayan football player, who played as a defensive midfielder.

Quintana started his career by playing for Club San Miguel de Misiones and then moved to Olimpia, where he won the 1998, 1999 and 2000 Paraguayan League. He then moved to FC Porto and returned on loan to Olimpia in 2002, year in which the club won the Copa Libertadores. The same year, he signed for Cruzeiro Esporte Clube and afterwards he played for a different number of clubs before retiring in 2008.

Between 1999 and 2003, he was summoned to play some games with the Paraguay national football team

== Titles ==
Season	Team	Title
1998	Olimpia	Paraguayan Primera
1999	Olimpia	Paraguayan Primera
2000	Olimpia	Paraguayan Primera
2002	Olimpia	Copa Libertadores
