= Leonardo Bordad =

Uruguayan footballer (born 1979)

Personal information
- Full name: Leonardo Octavio Bordad López
- Date of birth: June 30, 1979 (age 47)
- Place of birth: Montevideo, Uruguay
- Height: 1.90 m (6 ft 3 in)
- Position: Goalkeeper

Senior career*
Years	Team	Apps	(Gls)
2001–2006	Miramar Misiones	54	(0)
2005	→ 3 de Febrero (loan)	25	(0)
2006–2008	Olimpia	34	(0)
2008	Sol de América	20	(0)
2009	3 de Febrero	26	(0)
2009–2011	Sportivo Italiano	14	(0)
2010–2011	Durazno F.C.	8	(0)
Total		181	(0)
- * Club domestic league appearances and goals

Leonardo Octavio Bordad López (Note: In this Spanish name, the first or paternal surname is Bordad and the second or maternal family name is López.) (born June 30, 1979 in Montevideo, Uruguay), known as Leonardo Bordad, is an Uruguayan former professional footballer who played as a goalkeeper.
