= Rolando Renaut =

Paraguayan footballer (born 1987)

Personal information
- Full name: Rolando Rubén Renaut Torales
- Date of birth: August 5, 1987 (age 39)
- Place of birth: Villa Hayes, Paraguay
- Height: 1.75 m (5 ft 9 in)
- Position: Midfielder

Team information
- Current team: Central Español
- Number: 20

Senior career*
Years	Team	Apps	(Gls)
2006–2007	12 de Octubre	1	(0)
2007–2008	Olimpia	6	(0)
2008–2009	12 de Octubre	31	(0)
2010	Trinidense	2	(0)
2010	12 de Octubre	5	(0)
2011–	Central Español	17	(0)
- * Club domestic league appearances and goals

Rolando Renaut (born August 5, 1987, in Villa Hayes) is a Paraguayan footballer who plays as a midfielder for Real Madrid Español]].
