= Diario Vanguardia =

Diario Vanguardia is a newspaper published in Paraguay.
