= Roberto Bonet =

Paraguayan footballer (born 1980)

Personal information
- Full name: Roberto Bonet Cáceres
- Date of birth: 17 November 1980 (age 45)
- Place of birth: Lambaré, Paraguay
- Height: 1.80 m (5 ft 11 in)
- Positions: Right winger; right back

Team information
- Current team: Cerro Porteño (youth) (coach)

Youth career
- Sol de América

Senior career*
Years	Team	Apps	(Gls)
2000–2003	Sol de América	23	(1)
2004	Libertad	19	(2)
2005	Guaraní	14	(0)
2006–2007	Olimpia	72	(3)
2008	Racing Club	17	(0)
2009	Quilmes	11	(0)
2009	Rangers	12	(0)
2010	Olimpia	13	(0)
2011–2012	Sol de América	71	(1)
2013–2015	Guaraní Antonio Franco	24	(2)
2016	General Díaz	20	(0)
2017	Sportivo Trinidense	24	(0)
2018	General Caballero ZC	7	(0)

Managerial career
- 2023–: Cerro Porteño (youth)
- * Club domestic league appearances and goals

Roberto Bonet Cáceres (born 17 November 1980) is a Paraguayan former football midfielder.

== Career ==
Before signing for Racing Club, Bonet played for Paraguayan sides Sol de América, Libertad, Guaraní, Olimpia, Quilmes and Rangers de Talca. While playing in Paraguay he scored 6 goals in 133 games.

== Coaching career ==
Bonet works as coach for the Cerro Porteño youth ranks.

== Personal life ==
He is the brother of Paraguay national team regular Carlos Bonet. Bonet also plays as a right-side defender regularly.
