= Cristian Revainera =

Argentine footballer

Personal information
- Full name: Cristian Hernán Revainera
- Date of birth: 14 July 1982 (age 44)
- Place of birth: Buenos Aires, Argentina
- Height: 1.86 m (6 ft 1 in)
- Position: Midfielder

Senior career*
Years	Team	Apps	(Gls)
2000–2002	Berazategui	11	(2)
2002–2004	Defensa y Justicia	2	(0)
2003–2004	→ Boca Juniors (loan)	0	(0)
2004–2005	Argentino de Quilmes	30	(4)
2005–2006	Platense	11	(0)
2006–2007	Alvarado	16	(3)
2007	Temperley	4	(0)
2008	Čelik Zenica		
2009	Tiro Federal Rosario	0	(0)
2009–2010	Tiro Federal Morteros	16	(1)
2011	Villa Garibaldi	–	(–)
2012	3 de Febrero		
2013	Deportes La Serena	10	(1)
2013–2014	Berazategui	35	(3)
2015–2016	Atlético Pantoja		
2016–2017	Berazategui		
2017–2018	Unión y Fuerza	–	(–)
2018–2019	Dock Sud	3	(0)
- * Club domestic league appearances and goals

Cristian Hernán Revainera (born 14 July 1982) is an Argentine former footballer who played as a midfielder.

== Career ==
In his debut match with Deportes La Serena, in the "Night Granate" makes 2 goals, achieving victory over Naval Talcahuano.

=== Teams ===
- (Argentina) Berazategui 2000–2002
- (Argentina) Defensa y Justicia 2002–2003
- (Argentina) Boca Juniors 2003–2004
- (Argentina) Argentino de Quilmes 2004–2005
- (Argentina) Platense 2005–2006
- (Argentina) Alvarado 2006–2007
- (Argentina) Temperley 2007
- (Bosnia and Herzegovina) Čelik Zenica 2008
- (Argentina) Tiro Federal de Rosario 2009
- (Argentina) Tiro Federal de Morteros 2009–2010
- (Argentina) Villa Garibaldi 2011
- (Paraguay) 3 de Febrero 2012
- (Chile) Deportes La Serena 2013
- (Argentina) Berazategui 2013–2014
- (Dominican Republic) Atlético Pantoja 2015–2016
- (Argentina) Berazategui 2016–2017
- (Argentina) Unión y Fuerza 2017–2018
- (Argentina) Dock Sud 2018–2019
