= Henry Lapczyk =

Paraguayan footballer and coach (born 1978)

Personal information
- Full name: Henry William Lapczyk Vera
- Date of birth: 17 April 1978 (age 48)
- Place of birth: Fernando de la Mora, Paraguay
- Height: 1.84 m (6 ft 0 in)
- Position: Goalkeeper

Senior career*
| Years | Team | Apps | (Gls) |
| 2001–2004 | Cerro Corá | 40 | (0) |
| 2005–2006 | General Caballero | 11 | (0) |
| 2006–2007 | Olimpia Asunción | 55 | (0) |
| 2008 | Huachipato | 24 | (0) |
| 2009–2010 | Sportivo Luqueño | 33 | (0) |
| 2010 | Sol de América | 5 | (0) |
| 2010 | 3 de Febrero | 8 | (0) |
| 2011–2017 | Real Potosí | 176 | (1) |
| Total | | 352 | (1) |

International career
| 2007 | Paraguay | 1 | (0) |

Managerial career
- 2017: Real Potosí (caretaker)
- * Club domestic league appearances and goals

Henry William Lapczyk Vera (born 17 April 1978) is a retired Paraguayan footballer who played as a goalkeeper. He was most recently the head coach of Real Potosí.

== Career ==
Lapczyk began playing professionally in his native Paraguay, most notably for Club Olimpia where his success led to a brief spell with the Paraguay national football team. He moved to Chile to join CD Huachipato, but returned to Paraguay shortly after. He spent the last seven years of his career in Bolivia with Club Real Potosí.
