= Diario Popular (Paraguay) =

Newspaper published in Paraguay

Popular
- The newspaper most people read
- Type: Daily newspaper
- Owner: Nación Media
- Founder: Juan Carlos Wasmosy
- Founded: December 19, 1994
- Language: Spanish
- Headquarters: Asunción
- Circulation: 113,000 daily copies
- Price: Gs. 3,500 (Sundays) and Gs. 3,000 (Monday to Saturday)
- Website: www.popular.com.py

Diario Popular is a newspaper published in Paraguay.

Founded on December 19, 1994, in Asunción. It is part of Grupo Multimedia SA, which includes the digital newspaper Hoy, and the radio stations Popular y Corazón.
