= Javier Liendo =

Argentine footballer

Personal information
- Full name: Javier del Valle Liendo
- Date of birth: April 2, 1988 (age 38)
- Place of birth: Córdoba, Argentina
- Position: Midfielder

Team information
- Current team: Deportivo Táchira
- Number: 25

Senior career*
Years	Team	Apps	(Gls)
2005	Belgrano	10	(0)
2006	Ciudad de Murcia	0	(0)
2007	Boavista	0	(0)
2007	Nacional	0	(0)
2008	Bella Vista		
2008	Sportivo Luqueño	14	(0)
2009	2 de Mayo	4	(0)
2010	Carabobo	9	(2)
2010–2012	Racing de Córdoba	35	(1)
2012	General Paz Juniors	11	(1)
2013	Gimnasia y Tiro	4	(0)
2013–2014	Mitre	17	(3)
2014	Alumni de Villa María	12	(1)
2017	Las Palmas	13	(2)
2018–2019	Pérez Zeledón	30	(3)
2019	Instituto AC	0	(0)
2020–	Deportivo Táchira	3	(0)

International career
2005	Argentina U17	3	(0)
- * Club domestic league appearances and goals as of 19:06, 2 August 2020 (UTC)

Javier del Valle Liendo (born April 2, 1988, in Córdoba, Argentina) is an Argentine footballer. He currently plays as a midfielder for Deportivo Táchira.

Liendo represented Argentina at under-17 level in 2005.
