= Jorge Gallardo =

Jorge Gallardo (1924–2002) was a Costa Rican painter, poet, and short story writer.

== Biography ==
Jorge Gallardo (also known as the Artist of the People) was born in San Jose, Costa Rica on December 12, 1924. He was an artist and writer who traveled the world to improve his styles and techniques. As a teenager, Jorge Gallardo did not aspire, to be painter; instead, Gallardo dedicated his time earning money as a bank accountant at the Bank of Costa Rica. It was later in his last years of high school when Gallardo attention for art began to grow, and in 1948, he was able to chase his dreams as an artist with the help of Gonzalo Morales who helped him develop his passion as an artist. Gallardo was able to obtain scholarships and grants to travel and study at well known schools of art, such as the Academy of San Fernando in Spain, and San Marcos Academy in Italy, and later traveled to study back in Latin American academies, in which one of the school he attended was the Esmeralda Academy in Mexico. Throughout the period that he was traveling across the world, Gallardo improved his art skills and started to get recognized as an artist through multiple awards. Upon his return to the end of his educational period, Gallardo returned to San Jose, Costa Rica, in which he created artwork for big companies and associations, including National Bank of Costa Rica, The Porfirio Brenes Castro School, The Residence for Polio Children, amongst others. As a writer, Jorge Gallardo also numerous short novels and poems that focused on his developing study of Christina Realism, in which he criticized several leading countries through religious perspectives in Divine Justice (1974), Redagogia Diabolica (1978), among several other of his work. As an Artist, he was regarded as the “Artist of the People” because his work portrayed the everyday life of the working-class citizens in Costa Rica through flat, yet vibrant, colors which can be seen through Puntarenas, Bajo el Arbol, Cosecha, and several others. Jorge Gallardo died in 2002.

== Education ==
After discovering his passion for art with the help of Gonzalo Morales, Jorge Gallardo obtained scholarships to study in Europe, which at the time there was a rise for artist since World War Two had just ended. In Europe, he first attended the Academy of San Fernando in Spain in 1948, followed by the San Marcos Academy in Italy. During this time, Gallardo befriended several recognized artist and writers that also helped him improve his art and writing, such Octavio Paz, Gabriela Mistral, Alfonso Paso, Giovanni Papini, Maria Moreno Galvan, among several other important figures. Before returning to Costa Rica, Jorge Gallardo kept improving his work in other Latin American countries.

== Recognized paintings ==
=== Puntarenas ===
This piece done in 1983 through serigraphy medium, which represents fruit vendors in what would be the location in Costa Rica considered to be puntarenas, or Sand point, in which Jorge Gallardo wanted to display Costa Rican labor workers on their daily day lives.

=== Bajor el Arbol/Under the Tree ===
This piece's medium is serigraphy, which shows a woman at a stand serving a drink to a man near the beach. This work displays one of the working class workers in San Jose, Costa Rica.

Other works

- Frente Al Mar/Oceanfront
- Cosecha/Harvest
- Clavelones/Canations
- Macetas/Pots
- Vendedores de Frutas/Fruit Vendors
- Verano/Summer
- Vendedores de Loteria/Lottery Vendors
- Picapedrero/Stonecutter

== Awards ==
- National Prize 'Aquileo J. Echeverria' in Painting, San Jose, Costa Rica (1963)
- National Prize ' Aquileo J Echeverria' in Drawing, San Jose, Costa Rica (1971)
- Decoration, Portical Medal by holiness Paul VI (1973)
- Certificate 'work of Merit' by Council of Education, San Jose, Costa Rica (1980)t

== Novels and poems ==
- Divine Justice (1974)
- Give, Dawn of Love (1975)
- Celestina Interlactualoide (1975)
- Redagogia Diabolica(1978)

== Bibliography ==
- Carrillo, Rodolfo. “Jorge Gallardo.” Jorge Gallardo Pintor Costa Rica, RCB/ Ticoclub, 7 Jan. 2009, https://www.ticoclub.com/cpjorgallb.htm.
- Víquez Guzmán, Benedicto. “Jorge Gallardo Gómez.” Jorge Gallardo Gómez - El Arte Literario y Su Teoría, Zonalibre.com, 6 Jan. 2010, http://heredia-costarica.zonalibre.org/archives/2010/01/jorge-gallardo-gomez-1.html.
- Galería el Bigote de Dalí. “Inicio.” El Bigote De Dal, 2023, http://elbigotededalicr.com/wp/jorge-gallardo/.
- Go Visit Costa Rica. “Jorge Gallardo.” Go Visit Costa Rica, AN ELITE CAFEMEDIA TRAVEL PUBLISHER, 2023, https://www.govisitcostarica.com/travelInfo/famous-artists/jorge-gallardo.asp
- Arte de Colección Costa Rica. “Jorge Gallardo.” Arte De Colección Costa Rica, 2020, https://artedecoleccioncr.com/artistas/jorge-gallardo/.
- Editorial Costa Rica. “Gallardo, Jorge.” Editorial Costa Rica, 2023, https://www.editorialcostarica.com/escritor/1352.
- Grace, Engle. “Jorge Gallardo.” Prezi.com, 2019, https://prezi.com/p/udff58ro6nab/jorge-gallardo/.
- Presley, James. “My Little Collection of Costa Rican Painters.” Presley Expressionism Artblog, 18 Nov. 2017, https://pollocksthebollocks.wordpress.com/2017/11/16/my-little-collection-of-costa-rican-painters/.
- Professor, Yano. “Lesson No. 1.” Piensa En Arte, Accion Arte, 2007, pp. 3–4. https://profeyano.files.wordpress.com/2021/10/lecciones-completas-4-ano.pdf
- Sliger, Megan. “Alternatives Blog.” Art 200x Blog, 30 Nov. 2016, https://msligerblog.wordpress.com/2016/11/30/alternatives-blog/.
