= Cristian Ledesma (footballer, born 1987) =

Paraguayan footballer

Personal information
- Full name: Cristhian Rolando Ledesma Núñez
- Date of birth: 11 February 1987 (age 39)
- Place of birth: Lambaré, Asunción, Paraguay
- Height: 1.78 m (5 ft 10 in)
- Position: Striker

Youth career
- Vencedor
- Deportivo Pinozá
- Olimpia

Senior career*
Years	Team	Apps	(Gls)
2005–2007	Olimpia	36	(13)
2007–2011	Independiente	5	(0)
2009–2011	→ Olimpia (loan)	16	(1)
2012	Rubio Ñu	7	(1)
2013	Naval	9	(5)
2013–2014	Coquimbo Unido	34	(13)
2014–2015	Cobresal	12	(5)
2015–2016	Deportivo Quito	14	(3)
2016	→ Crucero del Norte (loan)	7	(1)
2016	Fernando de la Mora		
2018	Sportivo Trinidense	1	(0)
2019	Ovetense FC		
2020	Resistencia	–	(–)
2022	3 de Noviembre		
- * Club domestic league appearances and goals as of 18 May 2024

Cristhian Rolando Ledesma Núñez (born 11 February 1987), frequently and wrongly named Cristian Ledesma, is a Paraguayan football striker.

== Career ==
Ledesma started his career with Olimpia, playing for them in two stints. After scoring 10 goals in 19 games for Olimpia in the Paraguayan first division Apertura tournament he was signed by Independiente and moved to Argentina during the summer of 2007. Ledesma suffered a cruciate knee ligament injury at the start of the Apertura, delaying his first team debut and in January 2009 he returned to Olimpia.

Still a player of Independiente, he had a trial with Sportivo Luqueño at the beginning of 2012, but he finally signed with Rubio Ñu as a free agent. After, he moved to Chile and played for Naval, Coquimbo Unido and Cobresal. As a member of Cobresal, he won the 2015 Torneo Clausura, the first league title for the club.

In the second half of 2015, Ledesma moved to Ecuador and signed with Quito. The next year, he moved on loan to Argentina to play for Crucero del Norte.

Back in Paraguay, he played for clubs in the División Intermedia such as Fernando de la Mora, Sportivo Trinidense, Ovetense FC, Resistencia and 3 de Noviembre.

== Honours ==
Cobresal

- Chilean Primera División: 2015 Clausura
