= Fabio Ramos =

Paraguayan footballer (born 1980)

Personal information
- Full name: Fabio Ramón Ramos Mereles
- Date of birth: 14 June 1980 (age 46)
- Place of birth: Areguá, Paraguay
- Height: 1.63 m (5 ft 4 in)
- Position: Attacking midfielder

Team information
- Current team: Real Garcilaso

Senior career*
Years	Team	Apps	(Gls)
1996–1997	Nacional	10	(1)
1997–2003	Rio Ave F.C.	46	(3)
2003–2008	Nacional	176	(45)
2009	Emelec	12	(0)
2010	Nacional	24	(5)
2010–2011	Atlético Tucumán	17	(0)
2011	Nacional	20	(1)
2012–	Real Garcilaso	79	(22)

International career
2006	Paraguay	2	(0)
- * Club domestic league appearances and goals as of 2 September 2010

Fabio Ramón "Pitu" Ramos (born 14 June 1980) is a Paraguayan football attacking midfielder, for Torneo Descentralizado club Real Garcilaso.

Ramos started his career in Nacional of Asunción before signing to Portuguese side Rio Ave F.C. in 1998. Ramos returned to Paraguay in 2003 to play again for Nacional. In 2007, he was the Paraguayan 1st division topscorer along with Pablo Zeballos, netting 15 goals for Nacional of Paraguay.

He was transferred in the 2009 season to Ecuadorian giants Emelec. In 2010, he joined Argentine Primera B Nacional (second division) side Atlético Tucumán. In 2012 Fabio play for Real Garcilaso.
