= ABC Color =

Paraguayan newspaper

- Un diario joven con fe en la Patria ("A young newspaper with faith in the Fatherland"); El diario de mayor circulación de la República ("The newspaper with the largest circulation in the Republic"); El diario completo ("The complete newspaper")
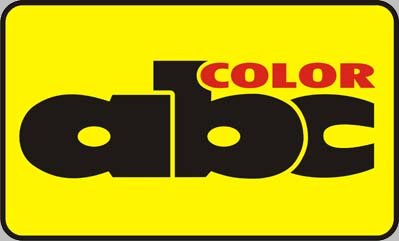

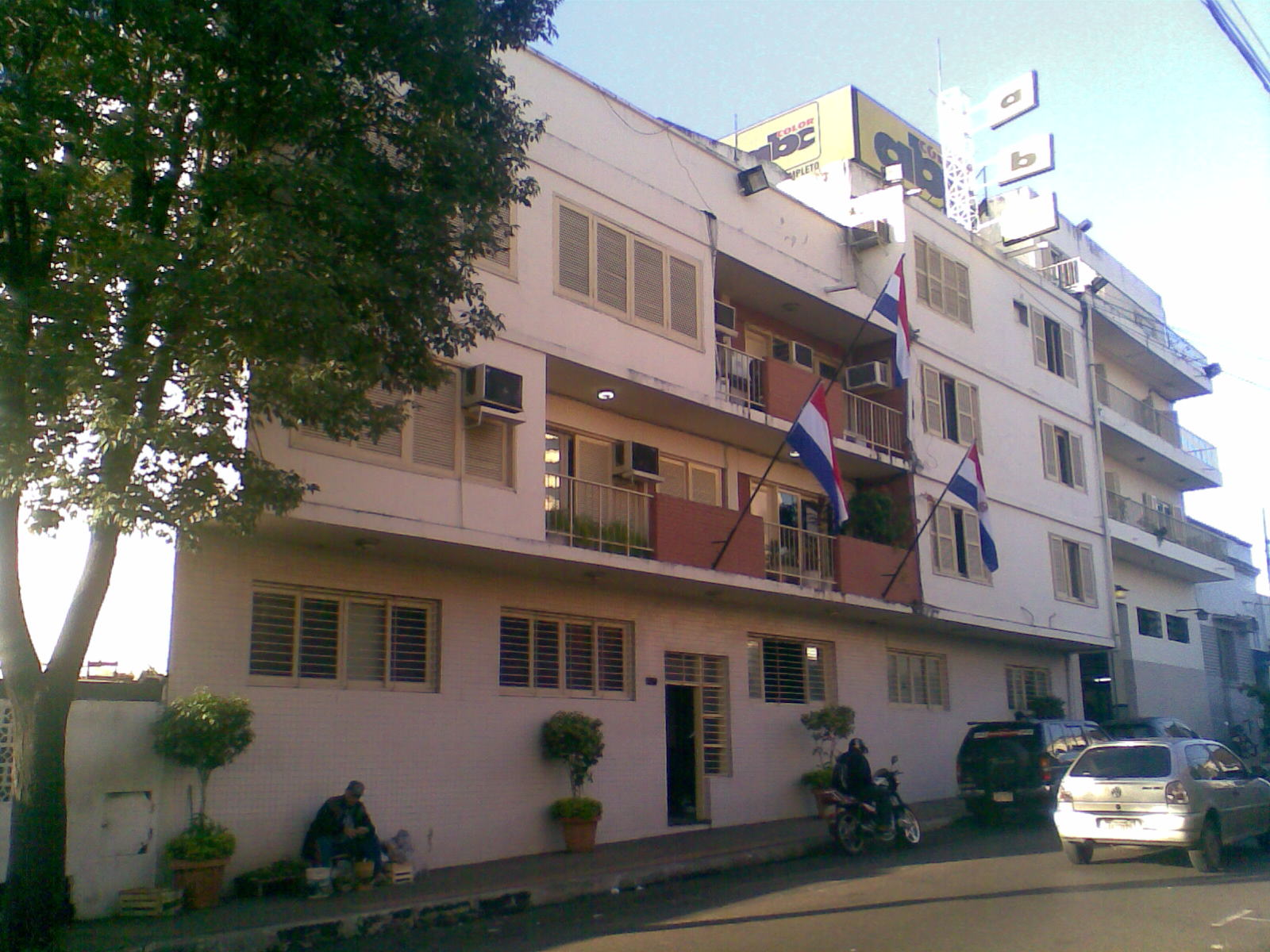
- Façade of the ABC Color headquarters
- Type: Daily morning newspaper
- Founded: August 8, 1967
- Language: Spanish
- Headquarters: Asunción, Paraguay
- Website: www.abc.com.py

ABC Color is a Paraguayan daily newspaper that is part of Editorial Azeta S.A., a subsidiary of Grupo Azeta. It was established in 1967 by Aldo Zuccolillo. Founded in August 1967, it has been regarded as Paraguay's newspaper of record.

== History ==
ABC Color was founded August 8, 1967 by Aldo Zuccolillo. It was the first newspaper in Paraguay to introduce color pages and the tabloid format. It also became the first to be distributed nationwide, reaching beyond the capital. It is one of the most widely read daily newspapers in Paraguay.

In its formative years, ABC Color supported Alfredo Stroessner's autocratic regime. During the founding event of the newspaper, Zuccolillo declared this is "a great newspaper serving a great government".

However, in the late 1970s and during the 1980s, ABC Color took a more critical position. This shift resulted in Zuccolillo being imprisoned for several days in 1983 due to his dissent against the regime. It also caused the forced suspension of the newspaper from March 22, 1984, until the end of Stroessner's dictatorship, in 1989. Additionally, months before the suspension, José María Orlando, a Uruguayan journalist who collaborated with the newspaper, was expelled from the country.

After its suspension, journalists associated with ABC Color were prohibited from establishing or participating in other media outlets. The editor was detained multiple times subsequently. Following the end of the dictatorship, the newspaper resumed publication on March 22, 1989, after a five-year hiatus.

Since resuming publication, ABC Color has featured a variety of supplements, including "Deportivo," "Motor °360," "El ABC Escolar," "Cultural," and "Económico." Notable discontinued supplements include "De mujer a mujer," "El ABC Estudiantil" (ceased in 2015), and "Salud familiar," which became part of "Nosotras" magazine in 2019. "ABC Rural" now appears as an addition to the Wednesday edition, and "Casa y Jardín" was also integrated into "Nosotras" magazine in 2019. The "Weekend" supplement ended in 2020, "Mundo Digital" in 2016, among others. The newspaper also published various magazines such as "Revista ABC," "Empresas y Negocios" (2012-2020), "Mundo Judicial" (2016-2017), "Nosotras" (2010-2019), "Gastronomía" (printed until 2019, then moved online), and "VIP" (2013-2020). In 1996, ABC Digital was launched, marking the first online presence for a Paraguayan newspaper and remains the most visited news website in the country.

In 2016, ABC Color was the media outlet with the highest number of daily readers and social media followers (on platforms such as Facebook and Twitter) in Paraguay. That year, the daily readership of ABC Digital's website exceeded 400,000, including users accessing via mobile phones, computers, or tablets, either through the website directly or via the app available in the Play Store and App Store. The circulation of its printed editions, including newspapers and periodicals, was recorded at 54,000 copies. Additionally, it became the first communication website in the country to surpass one million followers on its Facebook fan page.
