= 2007 in Paraguayan football =

The following article presents a summary of the 2007 football (soccer) season in Paraguay.

== First division results ==
The first division tournament was divided in two sections: the Apertura and the Clausura and had 12 teams participating in a two-round all-play-all system. The team with the most points at the end of the two rounds was crowned as the champion.

=== Torneo Apertura ===
Position	Team	Played	Wins	Draws	Losses	Scored	Conceded	Points
1	Sportivo Luqueño	22	14	5	3	45	22	47
2	Cerro Porteño	22	13	4	5	42	18	43
3	Libertad	22	11	7	4	30	16	40
4	Olimpia	22	10	8	4	29	21	38
5	3 de Febrero	22	8	6	8	23	25	30
6	Nacional	22	6	8	8	25	23	26
7	Tacuary	22	7	5	10	20	32	26
8	Trinidense	22	6	6	10	24	39	24
9	Sol de América	22	5	8	9	19	29	23
10	12 de Octubre	22	6	5	11	27	38	23
11	2 de Mayo	22	4	9	9	24	32	21
12	Guaraní	22	3	7	12	26	39	16

=== Torneo Clausura ===
Position	Team	Played	Wins	Draws	Losses	Scored	Conceded	Points
1	Libertad	22	17	4	1	36	14	55
2	Cerro Porteño	22	15	4	3	52	21	49
3	Olimpia	22	11	5	6	33	23	38
4	Sol de America	22	9	7	6	32	24	34
5	Nacional	22	9	7	6	37	30	34
6	12 de Octubre	22	7	5	10	23	29	26
7	Guaraní	22	6	7	9	24	27	25
8	Tacuary	22	6	7	9	25	29	25
9	Trinidense	22	5	9	8	15	18	24
10	Sportivo Luqueño	22	5	4	13	24	41	19
11	3 de Febrero	22	5	4	13	21	41	19
12	2 de Mayo	22	2	7	13	16	41	13

=== Championship game playoff ===
The national championship game was played between the Apertura and Clausura tournaments winners.

December 9, 2007

Sportivo Luqueño	1–1	Libertad

December 14, 2007

Libertad	2–0	Sportivo Luqueño

Libertad declared as national champions by aggregate score of 3–1.

=== Aggregate table ===
Team	Pts	GP	W	D	L	GF	GA	DIFF
1 Club Libertad	95	44	28	11	5	66	30	+36
2 Cerro Porteño	92	44	28	8	8	94	39	+55
3 Olimpia	76	44	21	13	10	62	44	+18
4 Club Sportivo Luqueño	66	44	19	9	16	69	63	+6
5 Club Nacional	60	44	15	15	14	62	53	+9
6 Club Sol de América	57	44	14	15	15	51	53	-2
7 Tacuary	51	44	13	12	19	45	61	-16
8 Club 12 de Octubre	49	44	13	10	21	50	67	-17
9 Club 3 de Febrero	49	44	13	10	21	44	66	-22
10 Sportivo Trinidense	48	44	11	15	18	39	57	-18
11 Club Guaraní	41	44	9	14	21	50	66	-16
12 Club 2 de Mayo	34	44	6	16	22	40	73	-33

Qualified to Copa Libertadores 2008 and Copa Sudamericana 2008
Qualified to Copa Libertadores 2008
Qualified to Copa Sudamericana 2008
Relegated to second division

=== Relegation / Promotion ===
- Sportivo Trinidense automatically relegated to the second division after finishing last in the aggregate points table.
- Club 12 de Octubre finished second-to-last in the aggregate points table, so had to participate in the promotion play-off game against second division runners-up Club General Diaz. 12 de Octubre won the playoff game by an aggregate score of 5–4, so it remains in the first division.

=== Qualification to international competitions ===
- Sportivo Luqueño qualified to the Copa Libertadores 2008 by winning the Torneo Apertura.
- Libertad qualified to the Copa Libertadores 2008 by winning the Torneo Clausura and the 2008 Copa Sudamericana by winning the national championship.
- Cerro Porteño qualified to the 2008 Copa Libertadores as the best finisher in the aggregate points table.
- Olimpia Asunción qualified to the 2008 Copa Sudamericana as the second-best finisher in the aggregate points table.

== Lower divisions results ==
Level	Tournament	Champion
2nd	Intermedia	Silvio Pettirossi
3rd (G.A. teams)	Primera de Ascenso	Sport Colombia
3rd (interior teams)	UFI Champions Cup	Benjamín Aceval (Villa Hayes)

== Paraguayan teams in international competitions ==
- Copa Libertadores 2007:
  - Libertad: quarterfinals
  - Cerro Porteño: group-stage
  - Tacuary: preliminary round
- Copa Sudamericana 2007:
  - Tacuary: preliminary second round
  - Libertad: preliminary first round

== Paraguay national team ==
The following table lists all the games played by the Paraguay national football team in official competitions during 2007.

Date	Venue	Opponents	Score	Comp	Paraguay scorers	Report
March 25, 2007	Estadio Universitario; Mexico	Mexico	2-1	Friendly	Santa Cruz 89'	
March 28, 2007		Colombia	2-0	Friendly		
June 3, 2007		Austria	0-0	Friendly		
June 6, 2007	Estadio Azteca; Mexico	Mexico	1-0	Friendly	Cardozo 88'	
June 20, 2007		Bolivia	0-0	Friendly		
June 28, 2007	Estadio José Pachencho Romero; Maracaibo, Venezuela	Colombia	5-0	Copa AméricaCopa América 2007	Santa Cruz 30' 46' 80'; Cabañas 84' 88'	Report
July 2, 2007	Estadio Agustín Tovar; Barinas, Venezuela	United States	1- 3	Copa América 2007	Barreto 29'; Cardozo 56'; Cabañas 90+2'	Report
July 5, 2007	Metropolitano de Fútbol de Lara; Barquisimeto, Venezuela	Argentina	1-0	Copa América 2007	-	Report
July 8, 2007	Estadio Monumental de Maturín, Maturín, Venezuela	Mexico	6-0	Copa América 2007	-	Report
August 22, 2007		Venezuela	1-1	Friendly		
September 8, 2007		Venezuela	3-2	Friendly		
September 12, 2007		Colombia	1-0	Friendly		
October 13, 2007	Estadio Monumental "U"; Lima, Peru	Peru	0-0	WCQ 2010	-	Report
October 17, 2007	Defensores del Chaco; Asunción, Paraguay	Uruguay	1 -0	WCQ 2010	Haedo Valdez 14'	Report
November 17, 2007	Defensores del Chaco; Asunción, Paraguay	Ecuador	5-1	WCQ 2010	Haedo Valdez 8'; Riveros 26' 87'; Santa Cruz 50'; Ayala 82'	Report
November 21, 2007	Estadio Nacional de Chile; Santiago, Chile	Chile	0-3	WCQ 2010	Cabañas 24' da Silva 45+1' 56'	Report
