= Sportivo Luqueño =

Association football club

- Full name: Club Sportivo Luqueño
- Nicknames: Auriazul (Blue-Yellow); Azul y Oro; El Chanchón (The Pig); Kure Luque (Luque Pig)
- Founded: May 1, 1921; 105 years ago
- Ground: Estadio Feliciano Cáceres; Luque, Paraguay
- Capacity: 26,974
- Chairman: Daniel Rodríguez (Paraguay)
- Manager: Hernán Rodrigo López (Uruguay)
- League: División de Honor
- 2025: División de Honor, 10th of 12
Home colours	Away colours	Third colours

Club Sportivo Luqueño is a Paraguayan football club, based in the city of Luque on the outskirts of the capital Asunción. It currently plays in the Paraguayan Primera División, the country's top tier of football, where it has won thrice, in 1951, 1953 and 2007-A. It is considered the third most popular football club in Paraguay.

== History ==
The club was founded in 1921 when three teams from the city of Luque (Marte Atlético, General Aquino and Vencedor) decided to merge and form one single club: Sportivo Luqueño. Only three years after its foundation, the team was already playing in the first division and fighting for the title. So far, Sportivo Luqueño has won three first division titles in the Paraguayan league, in 1951, 1953 and 2007.

For the 1999 Copa América, hosted by Paraguay, the club built a brand new stadium which seats 25,000, making it the third largest in Paraguay (after the Defensores del Chaco in Asunción and the Estadio Antonio Oddone Sarubbi in Ciudad del Este).

== Club anthem ==
The official anthem of Club Sportivo Luqueño was created in the first decades of the club, where in a group of fanatical musicians and artists Luqueños, decided to make a club on the eve of the club's anniversary. On that occasion several music dedicated to the institution were revealed, in which I highlight the song presented by Luqueño Musician Juan Bautista Almirón. Thus causing the euphoria of all those present, who accompanied with palms and choirs.

== Uniform and sponsors ==
From the beginning the design was always vertical blue and yellow stripes, and sometimes used the shirt or shirt as an alternative half blue and the other yellow in the 50s. But the club's traditional design was always used, and It was constituted by blue and yellow vertical stripes, which with time would be the representative colors, which identifies the city of Luque.

On the chest a shield with the initial C.S.L. and three golden stars included in the late 90s, represent the three clubs that merged for the creation of the club "Marte Atlético", "El Vencedor" and "Gral. Aquino", with blue shorts and blue or yellow socks .

== Nickname ==
The team is identified with the nickname of "Kuré Luque", because the city of Luque is famous for pigs (kuré, in Guaraní), and even the club owns a pig as a team mascot in its facilities. "Kuré Luque" (Pig from Luque; in the local Spanish dialect, Chancho Luqueño) comes from an old anecdote: the pigs were transported to Asunción in certain train carriages, which in football days were also used by fans and Sportivo Luqueño players. For this reason fans of opposite teams would say, "Here comes Kuré Luque."

== Honours ==
=== National ===
- Primera División
  - Winners (2): 1951, 1953, 2007-A
- Plaqueta Millington Drake
  - Winners (1): 1953
- División Intermedia
  - Winners (4): 1924, 1956, 1964, 1968

== Performance in CONMEBOL competitions ==
- Copa Libertadores: 3 appearances

First Round (3): 1976, 1984, 2008

- Copa CONMEBOL: 2 appearances

Best: Quarter-Finals (1) in 1993
First Round (1) in 1997

- Copa Sudamericana (7): 2015, 2016, 2017 2018, 2020,2024 and 2025

Best: Semifinals: 2015

== Current squad ==
As of 13 August 2025. Note: Flags indicate national team as defined under FIFA eligibility rules; some limited exceptions apply. Players may hold more than one non-FIFA nationality.

No.	Pos.	Nation	Player
1	GK	PAR	Francisco Mongelos
3	DF	PAR	Angel Brizuela
4	DF	PAR	Mathías Suárez
5	DF	PAR	Alexis Villalba
7	FW	PAR	Kevin Pereira
8	MF	PAR	Walter Rodríguez
9	FW	PAR	Federico Santander
10	FW	PAR	Sergio Díaz
11	FW	PAR	Walter González
12	GK	PAR	Alfredo Aguilar
13	MF	URU	Hugo Dorrego
14	MF	PAR	Fernando Benitez
15	MF	PAR	Sebastián Maldonado
16	MF	PAR	Ángel Benítez
17	FW	PAR	Brahian Ayala

No.	Pos.	Nation	Player
18	MF	PAR	Sebastián Quintana (on loan from Olimpia)
19	FW	PAR	Marcelo Pérez
20	DF	ARG	Rubén Darío Ríos
22	MF	PAR	Santiago Ocampos
23	DF	PAR	Alberto Espínola
24	FW	PAR	Aldo Parra
25	FW	PAR	Jonathan Ramos
26	DF	ARG	Lucas Monzón (on loan from Alvarado)
27	MF	PAR	Julio Báez
29	FW	PAR	Rodrigo Cáceres
30	DF	PAR	Thiago Cáceres
33	DF	PAR	Rodrigo Alborno
35	GK	PAR	Hugo Gaona
37	MF	ARG	Lautaro Comas
40	GK	PAR	Angel Espinola

== Notable players ==
To appear in this section a player must have either:

- Played at least 125 games for the club.
- Set a club record or won an individual award while at the club.
- Been part of a national team at any time.
- Played in the first division of any other football association (outside of Paraguay).
- Played in a continental and/or intercontinental competition.

- 1920s
- (Paraguay) Aurelio González (1920s)
- 1940s
- (Paraguay) Juan Bautista Villalba (1941–1947)
- (Paraguay) Dionisio Arce (1948–1949)
- 1950s
- (Paraguay) José Parodi (1950–1955, 1957–1958)
- (Paraguay) José Aveiro (1958)
- 1960s
- (Paraguay) Modesto Sandoval (1960–1964)
- 1970s
- (Paraguay) Juan Bautista Torales (1976–1981, 1993–1995)
- (Paraguay) Julio César Romero (Romerito) (1977–1979, 1990–1991, 1993–1994, 1996)
- (Spain) (Paraguay) Raúl Vicente Amarilla (1978–1979)
- 1980s
- (Paraguay) José Luis Chilavert (1982–1984)
- 1990s
- (Paraguay) Francisco Ferreira (1991–93, 2001, 2002)
- (Paraguay) Aristides Masi (1997, 1998–1999, 2001, 2002, 2005)
- (Paraguay) Aldo Adorno (1998–2000)
- 2000s
- (Paraguay) Luis Núñez (2000–2006, 2007–2008, 2010)
- (Paraguay) Vidal Sanabria (2000)
- (Colombia) Albeiro Usuriaga (2002)
- (Paraguay) Derlis Gómez (2002, 2004–2006)
- (Paraguay) Miguel Ángel Cuéllar (2004–2005)
- (Paraguay) Richart Báez (2005)
- (Paraguay) Daniel Sanabria (2005)
- (Paraguay) Alcidio Fleitas (2005)
- (Paraguay) Ricardo Tavarelli (2005)
- (Paraguay) Julio César Yegros (2005)
- (Paraguay) Miguel Ángel Benítez (2006)
- (Argentina) Juan Fernández Di Alessio (2007)
- (Paraguay) Juan Cardozo (2007)
- 2010s
- (Paraguay) Carlos Humberto Paredes (2010)
- (Paraguay) (Palestine) Javier Cohene (2010)
- (Argentina) Juan Pablo Raponi (2011)
- (Paraguay) Nelson Cuevas (2012)
- (Paraguay) Francisco Aldo Barreto Miranda (2014)
- 2020s
- (Paraguay) Isidro Pitta (2020)
- Non-CONMEBOL players
- (Cameroon) Bertrand Tchami (1998–1999)
- (Japan) Nobuhiro Takeda (2000)
- (Cameroon) Seidou Aboubacar (2003)
- (Cameroon) Guy Stéphane Essame (2004–2005)
- (Cameroon) Tobie Mimboe (2004)
- (Cameroon) Celestine Romed Ngah Kebe (2007–2008)
- (Cameroon) Nouga Georges (2009–2010)
- (Cameroon) Kenneth Nkweta Nju
- (Japan) Hideaki Ozawa (2010)
- (Japan) Sho Shimoji (2011)
- (Japan) Yuki Tamura (2011)
- (United States) Bryan Lopez (2007–2013)
- (Honduras) John Alston Bodden (2014)
- (South Africa) Brad Norman (2020)
- (Japan) Takayuki Morimoto (2021)

== Managers ==
- (Argentina) Feliciano Caceres 1921
- (Italy) Vessillo Bartoli (1950–1953)
- (Paraguay) Aurelio Gonzalez (1967-1969)
- (Paraguay) Carlos Arce (1975–1977)(1982)
- (Paraguay) Silvio Parodi ( 1983)
- (Paraguay) Raul Vicente Amarilla (1996)
- (Paraguay) Julio Carlos Gómez
- (Paraguay) Ever Hugo Almeida (2006)
- (Paraguay) Carlos Kiese (2007)
- (Argentina) Miguel Ángel Zahzú (2007–2009)
- (Paraguay) Carlos Jara Saguier (Sept 28, 2010 – Dec 11, 2010)
- (Uruguay) Guillermo Sanguinetti (Dec 9, 2010 – Feb 22, 2011)
- (Paraguay) Rolando Chilavert (July 1, 2011 – Oct 17, 2011)
- (Argentina) Daniel Lanata (Dec 2011)
- (Paraguay) Carlos Kiese (April 11, 2012 – July 3, 2012)
- (Paraguay) Pablo Caballero (July 9, 2012 – March 4, 2013)
- (Paraguay) José Cardozo (March 4, 2013 – May 8, 2013)
- (Paraguay) Alicio Solalinde (April 30, 2013 – March 8, 2014)
- (Uruguay) Eduardo Rivera (March 9, 2014– )
- (Argentina) Javier Sanguinetti (July, 2017– 2018)
- (Paraguay) Pedro Sarabia (Oct,2018)
- (Paraguay) Celso Ayala (2019–2020)
- (Paraguay) Luis Fernando Escobar (2020–2021)
- (Spain) Badayco Maciel (2021)
- (Argentina) Miguel Ángel Zahzú (2021–2022)
- (Paraguay) Julio Cesar Caceres (2023-2025)
- (Paraguay) Lucas Barrios (2025-2026)
- (Uruguay) Hernán Rodrigo López (2026-Now)
