= 2008 Club Olimpia season =

The following is a summary of the 2008 season by Paraguayan football (soccer) club Olimpia Asunción.

Olimpia participated in the following competitions in 2008: Torneo Apertura and Torneo Clausura (pertaining to the Paraguayan first division) and the Copa Sudamericana. In December, Eduardo Delmás was elected as the club's new president replacing Oscar Paciello.

== Torneo Apertura 2008 ==
Olimpia started the year 2008 with the announcement of a new coach, Argentine Gustavo Costas who promised the use and promotion of the youth division players. The main signing for the year was that of Paraguayan international Carlos Humberto Paredes from Sporting Lisboa. Paredes returned to his home club Olimpia after playing for 8 years in Europe.

=== Team roster ===
Note: Flags indicate national team as defined under FIFA eligibility rules; some limited exceptions apply. Players may hold more than one non-FIFA nationality.

No.	Pos.	Nation	Player
1	GK	URU	Leonardo Bordad
2	DF	URU	Diego Ciz
3	DF	PAR	Héctor Benítez
4	DF	ARG	Martín Pautasso
5	DF	PAR	César Zayas
6	MF	PAR	David Villalba
7	FW	ARG	Emanuel Fernandes
8	MF	PAR	Rodrigo Rojas
9	FW	PAR	Raúl Amarilla
10	FW	PAR	Edison Giménez
11	FW	PAR	Gilberto Palacios
12	GK	PAR	Rodrigo Romero
13	MF	PAR	Carlos Paredes (captain)
14	MF	PAR	Orlando Bordón
15	MF	PAR	Milton Benítez

No.	Pos.	Nation	Player
16	MF	PAR	Cristian Martínez
17	MF	PAR	Ángel Ortíz
18	FW	PAR	Juvenal Cardozo
19	DF	PAR	Oscar Jiménez
20	FW	PAR	Amílcar Franco
21	DF	PAR	Michel Godoy
22	MF	PAR	Osmar Molinas
23	MF	PAR	Rolando Renaut
24	MF	PAR	Mauro Monges
25	MF	PAR	Nicolás Martínez
--	GK	PAR	Blas Hermosilla
--	DF	PAR	Adalberto Benítez
--	DF	PAR	Luis Prieto
--	FW	URU	Martín García
--	DF	PAR	Gilberto Velázquez

- Coach: Gustavo Costas

=== Final standing ===
Team	Pts	GP	W	D	L	GF	GA	DIFF
1 Libertad	57	22	18	3	1	53	13	+40
2 Nacional	45	22	14	3	5	45	25	+20
3 Cerro Porteño	38	22	11	5	6	34	26	+8
4 Guaraní	36	22	11	3	8	31	26	+5
5 Club 2 de Mayo	31	22	9	4	9	27	26	+1
6 Sol de América	27	22	8	3	11	40	39	+1
7 Club 3 de febrero	27	22	8	3	11	32	40	-8
8 Olimpia	26	22	7	5	10	23	32	-9
9 Sportivo Luqueño	25	22	6	7	9	33	44	-11
10 Tacuary	23	22	5	8	9	24	34	-10
11 Club 12 de Octubre	20	22	4	8	10	29	40	-11
12 Silvio Pettirossi	13	22	3	4	15	21	47	-26

=== Results ===
Torneo Apertura 2008
Matchday	Home team	Result	Away team	Olimpia Goal(s)
1	Olimpia	0 - 1	Nacional	-
2	Tacuary	1 - 2	Olimpia	E. Giménez 5'; C. Paredes 57'
3	Olimpia	1 - 0	2 de Mayo	C. Paredes 7'
4	12 de Octubre	1 - 2	Olimpia	E. Giménez 45', 46'
5	Olimpia	2 - 1	3 de Febrero	E. Giménez 55'; R. Rojas 80'
6	Cerro Porteño	1 - 0	Olimpia	
7	Olimpia	3 - 3	Silvio Pettirossi	R. Rojas 38'; E. Francou 59'; E. Giménez 75' (P.K.)
8	Libertad	1 - 0	Olimpia	
9	Olimpia	0 - 2	Guaraní	
10	Olimpia	0 - 1	Sol de América	
11	Sportivo Luqueño	0 - 1	Olimpia	R. Amarilla 50'
12	Nacional	4 - 0	Olimpia	
13	Olimpia	2 - 2	Tacuary	E. Francou 11'; C. Zayas 45'
14	2 de Mayo	0 - 1	Olimpia	R. Amarilla 45'
15	Olimpia	0-0	12 de Octubre	
16	3 de Febrero	3-1	Olimpia	N. Martinez 51'
17	Olimpia	1-2	Cerro Porteño	C. Paredes 15'
18	Silvio Pettirossi	2-3	Olimpia	E. Giménez 1'; N. Martinez 31'; A. Villasanti 89' (O.G.)
19	Olimpia	1-2	Libertad	E. Giménez 36'
20	Guaraní	2-0	Olimpia	
21	Sol de América	2-2	Olimpia	E. Giménez 11'; G. Velázquez 88'
22	Olimpia	1 - 1	Sportivo Luqueño	E. Giménez 48'

=== Top scorers ===
Top scorers for Olimpia in the Apertura tournament:

Position	Player	Goals
1	(Paraguay) Edison Giménez	9
2	(Paraguay) Carlos Humberto Paredes	3
3	(Paraguay) Raúl Amarilla	2
3	(Argentina) Emanuel Fernandes	2
3	(Paraguay) Nicolás Martinez	2
3	(Paraguay) Rodrigo Rojas	2
7	(Paraguay) Gilberto Velázquez	1
7	(Paraguay) César Zayas	1

Hellboy

== Torneo Clausura 2008 ==
For the Clausura tournament the club hired the requested players by coach Gustavo Costas to fight for the title. However, poor performances and results both in the Paraguayan first division and Copa Sudamericana tournament resulted in the resignation of the Argentine coach on August 28. On the next day, Paraguayan Ever Hugo Almeida was chosen as the new coach of Olimpia, marking his return to the club since the 1993 season where he won the first division title in undefeated fashion.

=== Transfers ===
The following transfers occurred prior to the start of the Clausura tournament:

In:

- (Paraguay) Denis Caniza From (Mexico) Cruz Azul
- (Argentina) Jose Ramirez From (Argentina) Olimpo
- (Argentina) Franco Mendoza From (Argentina) C.A. Huracán
- (Paraguay) Edgar Daniel González From (Argentina) Estudiantes LP
- (Argentina) Juan Manuel Lucero From (Chile) CD Cobresal
- (Argentina) Cristian Leiva From (Belgium) Charleroi SC
- (Paraguay) Derlis Cardozo From (Paraguay) Club Libertad
- (Paraguay) Ever Caballero From (Paraguay) 12 de Octubre
- (Paraguay) Marco Lazaga From (Paraguay) Sportivo Luqueño
- (Paraguay) Darío Caballero From (Ecuador) Deportivo Quito
- (Argentina) Matías Espíndola From (Argentina) Sportivo Patria

Out:

- (Paraguay) Angel Ortiz To (Paraguay) Club Guaraní
- (Paraguay) Gilberto Palacios To (Paraguay) Club Guaraní
- (Paraguay) David Villalba To (Colombia) Deportes Tolima
- (Argentina) Emanuel Fernandes To (Argentina) Vélez Sársfield
- (Paraguay) Rolando Renaut To (Paraguay) 12 de Octubre
- (Uruguay) Leonardo Bordad To (Paraguay) Sol de America
- (Paraguay) Ricardo Dominguez To (Mexico) Cruz Azul Hidalgo
- (Paraguay) Michel Godoy To (Paraguay) 3 de Febrero
- (Paraguay) Rodrigo Romero To (Paraguay) 3 de Febrero
- (Paraguay) Milton Benítez To (Paraguay) 3 de Febrero
- (Paraguay) Mauro Monges Retired
- (Paraguay) Juvenal Cardozo To (Bolivia) Guabirá
- (Uruguay) Martín García To (Uruguay) Defensor Sporting

=== Team roster ===
Note: Flags indicate national team as defined under FIFA eligibility rules; some limited exceptions apply. Players may hold more than one non-FIFA nationality.

No.	Pos.	Nation	Player
1	GK	ARG	José Ramírez
2	DF	URU	Diego Ciz
3	DF	PAR	Héctor Benítez
4	DF	PAR	Darío Caballero
5	DF	PAR	Gilberto Velázquez
6	MF	PAR	Edgar González
7	FW	ARG	Matías Espíndola
8	MF	PAR	Rodrigo Rojas
9	FW	PAR	Marco Lazaga
10	FW	PAR	Edison Giménez
11	FW	PAR	José Sasiain
12	GK	PAR	Ever Caballero
13	MF	PAR	Carlos Paredes (captain)
14	FW	ARG	Juan Lucero
15	MF	PAR	Cristian Martínez
16	DF	PAR	Derlis Cardozo
17	GK	PAR	Blas Hermosilla

No.	Pos.	Nation	Player
18	MF	ARG	Cristian Leiva
19	DF	ARG	Martín Pautasso
20	DF	PAR	Denis Caniza
21	DF	PAR	César Zayas
22	MF	PAR	Osmar Molinas
23	FW	ARG	Franco Mendoza
24	DF	PAR	Juan Krone
25	MF	PAR	Nicolás Martínez
—	FW	PAR	Raúl Amarilla
—	DF	PAR	Adalberto Benítez
—	MF	PAR	Orlando Bordón
—	DF	PAR	Blas Cáceres
—	FW	PAR	Amílcar Franco
—	DF	PAR	Oscar Jiménez
—	DF	PAR	Luis Prieto

- Last Updated: August, 2008. * Players List(in Spanish)

=== Final standing ===
Pos	Team	Pts	GP	W	D	L	GF	GA	GD
1	Libertad	44	22	12	8	2	35	17	+18
2	Guaraní	43	22	12	7	3	36	17	+19
3	Cerro Porteño	37	22	10	7	5	32	26	+6
4	Sol de América	36	22	12	3	7	37	30	+7
5	Nacional	32	22	8	8	6	23	22	+1
6	Tacuary	31	22	9	4	9	23	24	-1
7	Olimpia	28	22	7	7	8	33	31	+2
8	12 de Octubre	28	22	8	4	10	27	33	-6
9	3 de Febrero	24	22	6	6	10	27	31	-4
10	Sportivo Luqueño	24	22	6	6	10	27	38	-11
11	2 de Mayo	22	22	4	10	8	26	33	-7
12	Silvio Pettirossi	9	22	1	6	15	15	39	-24

- Last Updated: December, 2008 *League Stats (in Spanish)

=== Results ===
Torneo Clausura 2008
Matchday	Home team	Result	Away team	Olimpia Goal(s)
1	Olimpia	0 - 0	Nacional	
2	Sol de América	4 - 3	Olimpia	F. Mendoza 35'; C. Leiva 47'; J. Krone 55'
3	Olimpia	4 - 0	Silvio Pettirossi	F. Mendoza 7', 23'; N. Martínez 51'; M. Lazaga 62'
4	3 de Febrero	2 - 0	Olimpia	
5	Olimpia	0 - 2	Guaraní	
6	Cerro Porteño	1 - 0	Olimpia	
7	Olimpia	2 - 1	Sportivo Luqueño	M. Lazaga 6', 62'
8	Libertad	1 - 1	Olimpia	J. Lucero 64'
9	Olimpia	1 - 3	Tacuary	M. Lazaga 13'
10	Olimpia	3 - 1	12 de Octubre	M. Lazaga 25'; R. Rojas 68'; E. González 75'
11	2 de Mayo	1 - 1	Olimpia	D. Caballero 39'
12	Nacional	1 - 1	Olimpia	M. Lazaga 38'
13	Olimpia	1 - 1	Sol de América	C. Paredes 34'
14	Silvio Pettirossi	2 - 3	Olimpia	C. Paredes 5'; M. Lazaga 42', 47'
15	Olimpia	2 - 0	3 de Febrero	M. Pautasso 33'; R. Rojas 57'
16	Guaraní	1 - 1	Olimpia	D. Caballero 94'
17	Olimpia	1 - 3	Cerro Porteño	M. Lazaga 34'
18	Sportivo Luqueño	1 - 2	Olimpia	O. Molinas 9'; C. Álvarez 90'
19	Olimpia	1 - 2	Libertad	E. Giménez 60'
20	Tacuary	1 - 1	Olimpia	R. Amarilla 77'
21	12 de Octubre	0 - 3	Olimpia	F. Mendoza 45'; R. Rojas 67'; J. Candia 60' (O.G.)
22	Olimpia	2 - 3	2 de Mayo	D. Cardozo 6'; E. Giménez 36'

=== Top scorers ===
Top scorers for Olimpia in the Clausura tournament.

Position	Player	Goals
1	(Paraguay) Marco Lazaga	9
2	(Argentina) Franco Mendoza	4
3	(Paraguay) Rodrigo Rojas	4
4	(Paraguay) Carlos Paredes	2
4	(Paraguay) Edison Giménez	2
4	(Paraguay) Darío Caballero	2
7
7	(Argentina) Cristian Leiva	1
7	(Argentina) Martin Albano Pautasso	1
7	(Paraguay) Juan Krone	1
7	(Paraguay) Nicolás Martínez	1
7	(Argentina) Juan Lucero	1
7	(Paraguay) Edgar González	1
7	(Paraguay) Raúl Amarilla	1
7	(Paraguay) Osmar Molinas	1
7	(Paraguay) Derlis Cardozo	1
7	(Paraguay) Cristian Álvarez	1

- Last Updated:December 24, 2008

== International competition(s) ==
=== Copa Sudamericana 2008 ===
Preliminary round

Date	Venue	Opponents	Score	Competition	Olimpia scorers	Match Report(s)
August 12, 2008	Defensores del Chaco; Asunción, Paraguay	(Bolivia) Club Blooming	4 - 2	Copa Sudamericana 2008	M. Lazaga 3', 8', 26'; D. Caballero 22'	Report
August 21, 2008	Ramón Tahuichi Aguilera; Santa Cruz, Bolivia	(Bolivia) Club Blooming	1 - 0	Copa Sudamericana 2008		Report; Report 2

First Round
(eliminated)

Date	Venue	Opponents	Score	Competition	Olimpia scorers	Match Report(s)
August 28, 2008	San Carlos de Apoquindo; Santiago, Chile	(Chile) Universidad Católica	4 - 0	Copa Sudamericana 2008		Report
September 17, 2008	Estadio Manuel Ferreira; Asunción, Paraguay	(Chile) Universidad Católica	2 - 2	Copa Sudamericana 2008	R. Rojas 3'; M. Lazaga 60'	Report

== See also ==
- 2007 Club Olimpia season
- 2009 Club Olimpia season
