= 2009 Club Olimpia season =

The following is a summary of the 2009 season by Paraguayan football (soccer) club Olimpia Asunción.

Olimpia participated in the following competitions in 2009: Torneo Apertura and Torneo Clausura (pertaining to the Paraguayan first division).

== Torneo Apertura 2009 ==
Olimpia started the year 2009 with the same coach as 2008, Ever Hugo Almeida. However, after only 4 rounds the directive board decided to replace Almeida with Uruguayan Gregorio Pérez, despite the team being in second position with an undefeated record of two wins and two draws.

=== Transfers ===
The following transfers occurred prior to the start of the Apertura tournament:

In:

- (Argentina) José María Buljubasich From (Chile) Universidad Católica
- (Argentina) Mario Jara From (Paraguay) Club 12 de Octubre
- (Ecuador) Ebelio Ordóñez From (Ecuador) Deportivo Quito
- (Paraguay) Celso González Ferreira From (Paraguay) Club Libertad
- (Paraguay) Juan Cardozo From (Paraguay) Nacional
- (Uruguay) Martín Ligüera From (Uruguay) Nacional
- (Paraguay) Cristian Ledesma From (Argentina) Independiente
- (Paraguay) Juan Daniel Cáceres From (Paraguay) Club Guaraní
- (Guatemala) Carlos Figueroa From (Guatemala) Club Xelajú MC
- (Guatemala) Carlos Ruiz From (Canada) Toronto FC
- (Venezuela) Oswaldo Vizcarrondo From (Venezuela) Caracas FC

Out:

- (Paraguay) Raúl Amarilla Romero To (Spain) Écija Balompié
- (Argentina) Cristian Leiva To (Argentina) Godoy Cruz
- (Paraguay) Edison Giménez To (Colombia) Deportes Tolima
- (Argentina) Martin Albano Pautasso To (Argentina) Belgrano
- (Paraguay) José Sasiain To (Paraguay) 12 de Octubre
- (Paraguay) Derlis Cardozo To (Argentina) Argentinos Juniors
- (Argentina) Franco Mendoza To (Ecuador) Emelec
- (Argentina) José Fabián Ramírez To (Argentina) Almagro
- (Paraguay) César Zayas To (Paraguay) Rubio Ñú

=== Team roster ===
Note: Flags indicate national team as defined under FIFA eligibility rules; some limited exceptions apply. Players may hold more than one non-FIFA nationality.

No.	Pos.	Nation	Player
1	GK	PAR	Ever Caballero
2	DF	URU	Diego Ciz
3	DF	PAR	Juan Daniel Cáceres
4	DF	PAR	Juan Cardozo
5	DF	PAR	Denis Caniza
6	MF	PAR	Edgar González
7	DF	PAR	Héctor Benítez
8	DF	PAR	Gilberto Velázquez
9	MF	PAR	Rodrigo Rojas
10	MF	PAR	Nicolás Martínez
11	MF	PAR	Orlando Bordón
12	GK	ARG	José Buljubasich
13	MF	PAR	Carlos Humberto Paredes
14	MF	ARG	Juan Manuel Lucero
15	DF	PAR	Celso González Ferreira

No.	Pos.	Nation	Player
16	DF	PAR	Óscar Jiménez
17	MF	URU	Martín Ligüera
18	FW	ECU	Ebelio Ordóñez
19	FW	PAR	Marco Lazaga
20	DF	PAR	Adalberto Benítez
21	GK	GUA	Carlos Figueroa
22	DF	PAR	Osmar Molinas
23	FW	PAR	Cristian Ledesma
25	DF	VEN	Oswaldo Vizcarrondo
26	MF	ARG	Mario Jara
27	FW	PAR	Diego Martínez
28	DF	PAR	Darío Caballero
29	FW	GUA	Carlos Ruiz
30	FW	ARG	Matías Espíndola
31	GK	PAR	Blas Hermosilla

- Coach: Gregorio Pérez

=== Standing ===
Updated March 15

Pos	Team	Pts	GP	W	D	L	GF	GA	DIFF
1	Libertad	24	12	7	3	2	28	9	19
1	Cerro Porteño	24	12	7	3	2	16	6	10
3	Nacional	21	12	5	6	1	19	12	7
4	Olimpia	21	12	5	6	1	17	11	6
5	Sportivo Luqueño	21	12	5	6	1	13	8	5
6	Tacuary	19	12	5	4	3	15	15	0
7	Rubio Ñu	16	12	5	1	6	14	15	-1
8	12 de Octubre	13	12	3	4	5	8	12	-4
9	Sol de América	12	12	2	6	4	10	16	-6
10	Guaraní	11	11	2	5	4	6	9	-3
11	2 de Mayo	6	11	1	3	7	13	22	-9
12	3 de Febrero	1	12	0	1	11	11	35	-24

=== Results ===
21 February 2009
17:30

Club Libertad	1 – 2	Olimpia
S. Aquino 27'		C. Figueroa 7'; E. Ordóñez 90'

Estadio Feliciano Cáceres, Luque

27 February 2009
17:30

Olimpia	1 – 1	Sol de América
C. Ruíz 22'		J.M. Caballero 90'

Estadio Manuel Ferreira, Asunción

4 March 2009
17:00

Olimpia	1 – 0	Club 2 de Mayo
C. Ruiz (P.K.) 85'

Estadio Manuel Ferreira, Asunción

8 March 2009
16:30

Club 12 de Octubre	0 – 0	Olimpia

Estadio Feliciano Cáceres, Luque

March 15, 2009
18:00

Olimpia	0 – 1	Rubio Ñú
		S. Leiva 8'

Estadio Manuel Ferreira, Asunción

March 21, 2009
18:00

Nacional	2 – 2	Olimpia
Fabio Escobar 63'; Guillermo Beltrán 68'		Rodrigo Rojas 9'; Martín Ligüera (P.K.) 28'

Estadio Arsenio Erico, Asunción

April 5, 2009
16:00

Sportivo Luqueño	1 – 1	Olimpia
Hugo Luzardi 34'		Edgar González 30'

Estadio Feliciano Cáceres, Luque

April 12, 2009
18:00

Olimpia	2 – 2	Tacuary
Martín Ligüera 65' (P.K.); Rodrigo Rojas 86'		Reinaldo Ocampo 1', 60'

Estadio Manuel Ferreira, Asunción

April 18, 2009
18:00

Olimpia	3 – 1	3 de Febrero
Martín Ligüera 23'; Carlos Ruiz 57'; Edgar González 79'		Cesar Llamas 84'

Estadio Manuel Ferreira, Asunción

April 22, 2009
19:00

Guaraní	0 – 0	Olimpia

Estadio Defensores del Chaco, Asunción

April 26, 2009
16:00

Olimpia	2 – 0	Cerro Porteño
Carlos Ruiz 27'; Osmar Molinas 47'

Estadio Defensores del Chaco, Asunción

May 2, 2009
20:00

2 de Mayo	2 – 3	Olimpia
Cristian Barinaga 29'; Cesar Canario 34'		Carlos Ruiz 82', 90'; Martín Ligüera 81'

Monumental Río Parapití, Pedro Juan Caballero

=== Top scorers ===
Top scorers for Olimpia in the Apertura tournament:

Position	Player	Goals
1	(Guatemala) Carlos Ruiz	6
2	(Uruguay) Martín Ligüera	4
3	(Paraguay) Rodrigo Rojas	2
3	(Paraguay) Edgar González	2
5	(Paraguay) Osmar Molinas	1
5	(Guatemala) Carlos Figueroa	1
5	(Ecuador) Ebelio Ordóñez	1

== Torneo Clausura 2009 ==
The Torneo Clausura is to be played in the second half of 2009.

== See also ==
- 2008 Club Olimpia season
