= Monge (surname) =

Monge is a surname. Notable people with the surname include:

- Carlos Monge Medrano (1884–1970), Peruvian physician
- Carlos Velásquez Monge, Guatemalan politician
- Chucho Monge (1910–1964), Mexican composer
- Edgard Monge (born 1965), Nicaraguan man convicted of assault for having unprotected sex without disclosing that he was HIV positive
- Emiliano Monge (born 1978), Mexican writer and novelist
- Fabian Monge (born 2001), Australian soccer player
- Félix Arcadio Montero Monge (1850–1897), Costa Rican lawyer, politician and union leader
- Gaspard Monge (1746–1818), French mathematician, politician and Comte de Péluse (Count of Pelusium)
- Janet Monge, American anthropologist, academic and museum curator
- Jean-Baptiste Monge (born 1971), French author and illustrator
- Joaquín García Monge (1881–1958), Costa Rican writer
- Johnny Araya Monge (born 1957), Costa Rican politician
- Jorge Hernán Monge (1938–2019), Costa Rican footballer
- José Trías Monge (1920–2003), Puerto Rican lawyer and judge
- Josue Monge (born 1999), Costa Rican footballer
- Jules Monge (1855–1934), French painter
- Julian Monge Najera (born 1960), Costa Rican ecologist, editor, educator and photographer
- Louis de Monge (1890–1977), Belgian engineer
- Lucia Monge, Peruvian artist, academic and writer
- Luis Monge (footballer) (born 1992), Argentine footballer
- Luis Monge (mass murderer) (1918–1967), American mass murderer
- Luis Alberto Monge (1925–2016), Costa Rican politician and President of Costa Rica from 1982 to 1986
- Manuel Monge (military figure) (born 1938), Portuguese general and politician
- Mauro Monges (born 1983), Paraguayan footballer
- Mario Monge (1938–2009), Salvadoran footballer
- Melissa Herrera Monge (born 1996), Costa Rican footballer
- Néstor Monge (born 1990), Costa Rican footballer
- Peter Monge, American academic and consultant
- Priscilla Monge (born 1968), Costa Rican artist
- Rolando Araya Monge (born 1947), Costa Rican politician
- Sid Monge (born 1951), Mexican baseball player
- Silvia Monge Villalobos (born 1967), Mexican politician
- Ventura Monge Domínguez (1914–1937), Spanish army officer
- Whitney Mongé (born 1987), American musician
- Yolandita Monge (born 1955), Puerto Rican singer, songwriter, and actress
- Zarela Villanueva Monge (born 1952), Costa Rican lawyer and judge
