= 2011 APF División de Honor =

Primera División
- Season: 2011
- Champions: Apertura: Nacional (8th title); Clausura: Olimpia (39th title)
- Relegated: General Caballero; 3 de Febrero
- 2012 Copa Libertadores: Olimpia; Nacional; Libertad
- 2012 Copa Sudamericana: Olimpia; Cerro Porteño; Tacuary; Guaraní
- Matches: 264
- Goals: 688 (2.61 per match)

The 2011 División Profesional season (officially the 2011 Copa TIGO- Visión Banco for sponsorship reasons) was the 77th season of top-flight professional football in Paraguay.

== Teams ==
Locations of the 2011 Primera División teams

Team	Home city	Stadium	Capacity
3 de Febrero	Ciudad del Este	Antonio Oddone Sarubbi	28,000
Cerro Porteño	Asunción	General Pablo Rojas	32,000
General Caballero	Asunción	Hugo Bogado Vaceque	5,000
Guaraní	Asunción	Rogelio Livieres	6,000
Independiente	Asunción	Ricardo Gregor	1,500
Libertad	Asunción	Dr. Nicolás Leoz	10,000
Nacional	Asunción	Arsenio Erico	4,000
Olimpia	Asunción	Manuel Ferreira	15,000
Rubio Ñu	Asunción	La Arboleda	5,000
Sol de América	Villa Elisa	Luis Alfonso Giagni	5,000
Sportivo Luqueño	Luque	Feliciano Cáceres	25,000
Tacuary	Asunción	Roberto Béttega	7,000

== Torneo Apertura ==
The Campeonato de Apertura, also the Copa TIGO -Visión Banco for sponsorship reasons, is the first championship of the season. It began on January 29 and ended on June 5.

=== Standings ===
Pos	Team	Pld	W	D	L	GF	GA	GD	Pts	Qualification or relegation
1	Nacional	22	14	5	3	34	18	+16	47	2012 Copa Libertadores Second Stage
2	Olimpia	22	12	6	4	44	22	+22	42	
3	Libertad	22	11	6	5	28	18	+10	39	
4	Guaraní	22	9	7	6	23	19	+4	34	
5	Rubio Ñu	22	8	7	7	35	34	+1	31	
6	Tacuary	22	6	12	4	17	14	+3	30	
7	Cerro Porteño	22	5	9	8	23	29	−6	24	
8	3 de Febrero	22	5	8	9	23	31	−8	23	
9	Independiente	22	4	10	8	26	29	−3	22	
10	Sol de América	22	5	6	11	21	33	−12	21	
11	Sportivo Luqueño	22	4	8	10	24	36	−12	20	
12	General Caballero	22	4	6	12	21	36	−15	18	

Source: RSSSF
Rules for classification: 1st points. If two teams are tied on points, a playoff game will be held to break the tie. If more than two clubs are tied on points, the following will be used as a tiebreaker: 1st goal difference; 2nd goals scored; 3rd away-goals scored; 4th draw of lots

=== Results ===
Home \ Away	3FE	CER	GCA	GUA	IND	LIB	NAC	OLI	RUB	SOL	SLU	TAC
3FE		1–2	1–0	1–1	3–2	3–3	0–2	3–2	2–2	0–1	1–0	0–0
CER	1–1		2–2	0–0	1–1	1–2	1–2	1–2	1–1	1–1	1–0	1–1
GCA	0–0	1–0		0–1	1–2	0–1	1–3	1–2	1–5	3–2	1–0	1–1
GUA	1–0	1–0	2–1		2–0	1–2	2–2	0–0	2–1	2–0	2–0	1–2
IND	0–1	0–1	2–2	0–0		2–0	5–1	0–3	4–4	1–1	1–1	1–0
LIB	3–0	1–1	2–0	0–0	1–0		0–1	0–0	4–1	1–2	2–1	0–0
NAC	1–1	2–0	3–1	2–1	1–0	1–2		1–2	3–0	2–0	0–0	1–0
OLI	3–1	0–2	3–1	4–3	1–1	2–2	1–2		1–3	2–0	5–0	0–0
RUB	1–0	2–2	1–0	3–0	2–2	0–1	0–0	0–3		1–0	2–1	0–1
SOL	3–2	2–3	1–2	0–1	1–0	0–1	0–0	0–4	3–4		1–1	0–0
SLU	2–1	4–1	1–1	1–0	1–1	1–0	1–3	1–4	2–2	2–2		2–2
TAC	1–1	2–0	1–1	0–0	1–1	1–0	0–1	0–0	1–0	0–1	3–2	

Legend: Blue = home team win; Yellow = draw; Red = away team win.

Copa TIGO
2011 Apertura champion

8th title

== Torneo Clausura ==
The Campeonato de Clausura, also the Copa TIGO -Visión Banco for sponsorship reasons, is the second championship of the season. It began on July 29 and ended on December 11.

=== Standings ===
Pos	Team	Pld	W	D	L	GF	GA	GD	Pts	Qualification or relegation
1	Olimpia	22	14	4	4	38	22	+16	46	2012 Copa Libertadores Second Stage
2	Cerro Porteño	22	12	7	3	41	22	+19	43	
3	Libertad	22	11	7	4	36	19	+17	40	
4	Nacional	22	11	3	8	34	27	+7	36	
5	Tacuary	22	7	9	6	31	28	+3	30	
6	Independiente	22	7	9	6	29	26	+3	30	
7	Sol de América	22	7	7	8	27	30	−3	28	
8	Rubio Ñu	22	7	6	9	25	29	−4	27	
9	Guaraní	22	6	6	10	32	37	−5	24	
10	General Caballero	22	7	2	13	29	49	−20	23	
11	3 de Febrero	22	4	6	12	29	41	−12	18	
12	Sportivo Luqueño	22	3	6	13	18	39	−21	15	

Updated to match(es) played on 18 December 2011. Source: APF
Rules for classification: 1st points. If two teams are tied on points, a playoff game will be held to break the tie. If more than two clubs are tied on points, the following will be used as a tiebreaker: 1st goal difference; 2nd goals scored; 3rd away-goals scored; 4th draw of lots

=== Results ===
Home \ Away	3FE	CER	GCA	GUA	IND	LIB	NAC	OLI	RUB	SOL	SLU	TAC
3FE		1–1	5–2	0–2	0–1	2–1	1–1	0–1	1–2	2–2	1–1	2–3
CER	3–0		5–1	0–1	0–1	1–1	1–3	0–0	1–1	2–0	4–2	2–1
GCA	3–7	2–4		2–0	2–1	0–3	2–0	1–2	0–1	1–2	2–1	1–1
GUA	0–0	0–2	1–2		2–2	0–3	1–2	3–4	2–2	3–1	2–0	0–0
IND	2–0	1–3	1–1	1–1		1–1	3–1	0–2	3–1	1–1	0–0	1–0
LIB	4–1	0–1	1–0	3–2	2–2		1–1	2–1	2–1	0–2	2–0	1–1
NAC	2–0	1–1	3–0	5–2	2–1	2–1		1–0	1–2	0–1	2–1	3–4
OLI	4–0	1–1	2–1	2–0	2–2	0–2	1–0		2–1	1–0	2–0	3–1
RUB	2–1	0–2	0–2	2–2	1–1	0–2	2–3	1–1		2–0	1–0	1–2
SOL	1–3	2–2	4–0	2–1	3–1	0–3	0–1	1–3	0–0		1–1	1–1
SLU	1–0	2–3	1–4	1–5	0–3	0–0	1–0	3–1	0–2	1–2		2–2
TAC	2–2	1–2	4–0	1–2	1–0	1–1	1–0	2–3	1–0	1–1	0–0	

Legend: Blue = home team win; Yellow = draw; Red = away team win.

Copa TIGO
2011 Clausura champion

39th title

== Aggregate table ==
Pos	Team	Pld	W	D	L	GF	GA	GD	Pts	Qualification or relegation
1	Olimpia	44	26	10	8	82	44	+38	88	2012 Copa Libertadores Second Stage and 2012 Copa Sudamericana First Stage (Note: Olimpia and Nacional are qualified for the second stage of the 2012 Copa Libertadores as the Clausura and Apertura champions respectively. Olimpia are also qualified for the first stage of the 2012 Copa Sudamericana as the champion with the better aggregate record.)
2	Nacional	44	25	8	11	68	45	+23	83	2012 Copa Libertadores Second Stage
3	Libertad	44	22	13	9	64	37	+27	79	2012 Copa Libertadores First Stage
4	Cerro Porteño	44	17	16	11	64	51	+13	67	2012 Copa Sudamericana First Stage
5	Tacuary	44	13	21	10	48	42	+6	60	2012 Copa Sudamericana First Stage
6	Guaraní	44	15	13	16	55	56	−1	58	2012 Copa Sudamericana First Stage
7	Rubio Ñu	44	15	13	16	60	63	−3	58	
8	Independiente	44	11	19	14	53	53	0	52	
9	Sol de América	44	12	13	19	48	63	−15	49	
10	3 de Febrero	44	9	14	21	52	72	−20	41	
11	General Caballero	44	11	8	25	50	85	−35	41	
12	Sportivo Luqueño	44	7	14	23	42	75	−33	35	

Updated to match(es) played on 18 December 2011. Source:
Rules for classification: 1st points. If two teams are tied on points, a playoff game will be held to break the tie. If more than two clubs are tied on points, the following will be used as a tiebreaker: 1st goal difference; 2nd goals scored; 3rd away-goals scored; 4th draw of lots

== Relegation ==
Relegations is determined at the end of the season by computing an average (Spanish: promedio) of the number of points earned per game over the past three seasons. The two teams with the lowest average is relegated to the División Intermedia for the following season.

Pos	Team	'09 Pts	'10 Pts	'11 Pts	Total Pts	Total Pld	Avg	Relegation
1	Libertad	82	87	79	248	132	1.8788	
2	Cerro Porteño	81	91	67	239	132	1.8106	
3	Nacional	77	77	83	237	132	1.7955	
4	Olimpia	70	71	88	229	132	1.7348	
5	Guaraní	67	85	58	210	132	1.5909	
6	Rubio Ñú	63	66	58	187	132	1.4167	
7	Tacuary	64	37	60	161	132	1.2197	
8	Independiente	0	0	52	52	44	1.1818	
9	Sol de América	50	45	49	144	132	1.0909	
10	Sportivo Luqueño	51	42	35	128	132	0.9697	
11	General Caballero	0	0	41	41	44	0.9318	Relegated to the División Intermedia
12	3 de Febrero	43	38	41	122	132	0.9242	Relegated to the División Intermedia

== Top goalscorers ==
Rank	Player	Nationality	Club	Goals
1	Pablo Zeballos	Paraguayan	Olimpia	13
2	Robin Ramírez	Paraguayan	Rubio Ñú	12
3	Cesar Caceres	Paraguayan	3 de Febrero	10
4	Víctor Aquino	Paraguayan	Nacional	9
4	Juan Carlos Ferreyra	Argentine	Olimpia	9
6	Lorenzo Melgarejo	Paraguayan	Independiente	8
6	Vladimir Marín	Colombian	Olimpia	8
8	Reinaldo Ocampo	Paraguayan	Rubio Ñú	6
8	Ariel Bogado	Paraguayan	Nacional	6
10	Sergio Fernández	Paraguayan	General Caballero	5
10	Hugo Santa Cruz	Paraguayan	General Caballero	5
10	Erwin Ávalos	Paraguayan	Sol de América	5
10	Brian Montenegro	Paraguayan	Tacuary	5
10	Sergio Escalante	Argentine	Sportivo Luqueño	5

== See also ==
- 2011 in Paraguayan football
