= Monge (disambiguation) =

Gaspard Monge (1746–1818) was a French mathematician.

Monge may also refer to:

- Monge (surname), a surname and list of people with the name
- Monge (crater), a lunar crater
- Monge's disease, a high-altitude sickness
- French ship Monge (A601), a French missile range instrumentation ship
- French submarine Monge (1908), a Pluviôse-class submarine
- French submarine Monge (Q144), a Redoutable-class submarine
