= Luis Prieto =

Luis Prieto may refer to:

- Luis Jorge Prieto (es) (1926–1996), Argentinian semiotician
- Luis Prieto (director) (born 1970), Spanish film director
- Luis Prieto (footballer, born 1979), Spanish association football player
- Luis Prieto (Paraguayan footballer) (born 1988), Paraguayan footballer for Ayacucho FC
- a fictional character
