= Raúl Amarilla =

Raúl Amarilla may refer to:

- Raúl Amarilla (footballer, born 1960), Spanish football striker and football manager
- Raúl Amarilla (footballer, born 1988), Paraguayan football striker, and son of footballer born 1960
