= 2008 Copa Sudamericana preliminary stage =

Preliminary round of Copa Sudamericana 2008

This is the preliminary round of the Copa Sudamericana 2008 tournament. The teams that have qualified for the preliminary round are the second-placed teams from each South American country, excluding Brazil and Argentina. A total of eight teams will play in two-legged matches. Four teams will proceed to the next round. Team 1 will play the first leg at home. The away goals rule will be employed in this round. The preliminary round was scheduled to be played between July 29 and August 21.

Team 1	Agg.	Team 2	1st leg	2nd leg
River Plate (Uruguay)	2–4	(Chile) Universidad Catolica	2–0	0–4
Unión Atlético Maracaibo (Venezuela)	2–4	(Colombia) América de Cali	0–0	2–4
Universitario (Peru)	1–2	(Ecuador) Deportivo Quito	0–0	1–2
Olimpia (Paraguay)	4–3	(Bolivia) Club Blooming	4–2	0–1

== Matches ==
=== First leg ===
2008-07-29
21:15 (UTC-3)

River Plate (Uruguay)	2 – 0	(Chile) Universidad Catolica
Souza 45'; Rodríguez 75'	Report

Centenario, Montevideo
Referee: Antonio Arias (Paraguay)

2008-07-30
19:15 (UTC-5)

Universitario (Peru)	0 – 0	(Ecuador) Deportivo Quito
	Report

Monumental, Lima
Referee: José Buitrago (Colombia)

2008-07-31
19:45 (UTC-4:30)

Maracaibo (Venezuela)	0 – 0	(Colombia) América de Cali
	Report

José Pachencho Romero, Maracaibo
Referee: Carlos Vera (Ecuador)

2008-08-12
21:30 (UTC-3)

Olimpia (Paraguay)	4 – 2	(Bolivia) Club Blooming
Lazaga 3' 8' 26'; Caballero 22'	Report	Carlos 72'; Gonzága 75' (pen.)

Defensores del Chaco, Asunción
Referee: Líber Prudente (Uruguay)

=== Second leg ===
2008-08-05
17:00 (UTC-5)

(Ecuador) Deportivo Quito	2 – 1	(Peru) Universitario
Donoso 38' (pen.) 58'	Report	Nazareno 78' (o.g.)

Olímpico Atahualpa, Quito
Referee: Wilmar Rondán (Colombia)

2008-08-07
20.00 (UTC-4)

Universidad Católica (Chile)	4 – 0	(Uruguay) River Plate
Gutiérrez 8'; Mirosevic 39'; M.González 56'; Núnez 81'	Report

San Carlos de Apoquindo, Santiago
Referee: Víctor Hugo Rivera (Perú)

2008-08-07
21:10 (UTC-5)

América de Cali (Colombia)	4 – 2	(Venezuela) Maracaibo
Cortés 36' 83'; Ramos 52'; Arango 68'	Report	Figueroa 2'; Díaz 62'

Olímpico Pascual Guerrero, Cali
Referee: Óscar Maldonado (Bolívia)

2008-08-21
18:10 (UTC-3)

Club Blooming (Bolivia)	1 – 0	(Paraguay) Olimpia
Gomez 85'	Report

Ramón Tahuichi Aguilera, Santa Cruz
Referee: Alfredo Intriago (Ecuador)
