= Luis Monge =

Luis Monge may refer to:

- Luis Monge Espinel (politician) (born 1965), Ecuador
- Luis Monge (footballer) (born 1992), Argentine footballer
- Luis Monge (mass murderer) (1918–1967), Puerto Rican-American mass murderer
- Luis Alberto Monge (1925–2016), Costa Rican politician
- Luis Monge Sánchez (1948–), Chilean politician
