= Emmanuel Fernandez =

Emmanuel Fernandez is the name of:

- Emmanuel Fernandez (ice hockey), Canadian hockey player
- Emmanuel Fernandez (footballer), Nigerian footballer
- Emmanuel Fernandez (wrestler), American wrestler

== See also ==
- Emmanuel Fernandes Francou, Argentine footballer
