= Derlis Cardozo =

Paraguayan footballer (born 1981)

Personal information
- Full name: Derlis Aníbal Cardozo
- Date of birth: 16 June 1981 (age 45)
- Place of birth: Pedro Juan Caballero, Paraguay
- Height: 1.72 m (5 ft 7 1/2 in)
- Position: Defender

Team information
- Current team: 3 de Febrero

Senior career*
Years	Team	Apps	(Gls)
2003	Cerro Porteño PF	?	(?)
2004	Luqueño	16	(2)
2005	2 de Mayo	?	(?)
2005–2007	Luqueño	74	(4)
2007–2008	Libertad	32	(0)
2008	Olimpia	11	(1)
2009	→ Argentinos (loan)	9	(0)
2009–2010	Unión de Santa Fe	25	(0)
2010–2011	Luqueño	28	(0)
2011–2013	3 de Febrero	5	(0)

International career
2007	Paraguay	1	(0)
- * Club domestic league appearances and goals as of 15 July 2009

Derlis Aníbal Cardozo (born 16 June 1981) is a Paraguayan football defender.

== Career ==
On 23 January 2009 Olimpia de Asunçion 27-year-old wingback, will play on loan for one year for Argentinos Juniors.

Cardozo started his career in Cerro Porteño PF of Presidente Franco before playing for other Paraguayan clubs such as Sportivo Luqueño, 2 de Mayo, Libertad and Olimpia.

== Titles ==
Season	Team	Title
2007	Libertad	Paraguayan 1st Division
2008	Libertad	Apertura 2008
