= Torneo Apertura 2008 (Paraguay) =

Primera División
- Season: 2008 Apertura

The Torneo Apertura 2008 (official name: Copa Tigo 2008) was the football (soccer) tournament that opened the season in the Paraguayan first division.

The tournament began on February 15 and ended on June 29 with the participation of 12 teams, playing a two-legged all play all system. Club Libertad accumulated the most points and became the champions, securing a spot for the Copa Libertadores 2009.

== Standings ==
Pos	Team	Pld	W	D	L	GF	GA	GD	Pts
1	Libertad	22	18	3	1	53	13	+40	57
2	Nacional	22	14	3	5	45	25	+20	45
3	Cerro Porteño	22	11	5	6	34	26	+8	38
4	Guaraní	22	11	3	8	31	26	+5	36
5	2 de Mayo	22	9	4	9	27	26	+1	31
6	Sol de América	22	8	3	11	40	39	+1	27
7	3 de Febrero	22	8	3	11	32	40	−8	27
8	Olimpia	22	7	5	10	23	32	−9	26
9	Sportivo Luqueño	22	6	7	9	33	44	−11	25
10	Tacuary	22	5	8	9	24	34	−10	23
11	12 de Octubre	22	4	8	10	29	40	−11	20
12	Silvio Pettirossi	22	3	4	15	21	47	−26	13

Updated to match(es) played on June 24, 2008. Source: League Stats (in Spanish)
Rules for classification: 1) points; 2) goal difference; 3) number of goals scored.

== Results ==
Matchday 1
Home team	Result	Away team
Sol de América	1 - 3	Sportivo Luqueño
Libertad	3 - 1	2 de Mayo
Cerro Porteño	2 - 4	3 de Febrero
Silvio Pettirossi	2 - 1	12 de Octubre
Guaraní	2 - 0	Tacuary
Olimpia	0 - 1	Nacional

Matchday 2
Home team	Result	Away team
Cerro Porteño	2 - 1	Sol de América
2 de Mayo	2 - 0	Guaraní
Tacuary	1 - 2	Olimpia
12 de Octubre	2 - 2	Libertad
3 de Febrero	0 - 0	Silvio Pettirossi
Nacional	1 - 3	Sportivo Luqueño

Matchday 3
Home team	Result	Away team
Libertad	4 - 0	3 de Febrero
Sportivo Luqueño	1 - 1	Tacuary
Silvio Pettirossi	1 - 2	Cerro Porteño
Sol de América	1 - 3	Nacional
Guaraní	1 - 0	12 de Octubre
Olimpia	1 - 0	2 de Mayo

Matchday 4
Home team	Result	Away team
Tacuary	2 - 1	Nacional
3 de Febrero	1 - 2	Guaraní
12 de Octubre	1 - 2	Olimpia
Silvio Pettirossi	2 - 4	Sol de América
Cerro Porteño	0 - 2	Libertad
2 de Mayo	2 - 0	Sportivo Luqueño

Matchday 5
Home team	Result	Away team
Guaraní	0 - 2	Cerro Porteño
Libertad	3 - 0	Silvio Pettirossi
Sol de América	4 - 1	Tacuary
Nacional	2 - 1	2 de Mayo
Sportivo Luqueño	3 - 2	12 de Octubre
Olimpia	2 - 1	3 de Febrero

Matchday 6
Home team	Result	Away team
12 de Octubre	1 - 3	Nacional
Silvio Pettirossi	1 - 2	Guaraní
Libertad	4 - 0	Sol de américa
2 de Mayo	1 - 2	Tacuary
Cerro Porteño	1 - 0	Olimpia
3 de Febrero	4 - 2	Sportivo Luqueño

Matchday 7
Home team	Result	Away team
Sol de América	1 - 2	2 de Mayo
Nacional	2 - 1	3 de Febrero
Guaraní	0 - 3	Libertad
Sportivo Luqueño	0 - 5	Cerro Porteño
Tacuary	1 - 2	12 de Octubre
Olimpia	3 - 3	Silvio Pettirossi

Matchday 8
Home team	Result	Away team
Libertad	1 - 0	Olimpia
Guaraní	3 - 1	Sol de América
Cerro Porteño	0 - 0	Nacional
3 de Febrero	2 - 4	Tacuary
12 de Octubre	2 - 0	2 de Mayo
Silvio Pettirossi	2 - 0	Sportivo Luqueño

Matchday 9
Home team	Result	Away team
Sportivo Luqueño	0 - 1	Libertad
2 de Mayo	1 - 2	3 de Febrero
Sol de América	2 - 3	12 de Octubre
Tacuary	1 - 1	Cerro Porteño
Nacional	2 - 0	Silvio Pettirossi
Olimpia	0 - 2	Guaraní

Matchday 10
Home team	Result	Away team
Libertad	1 - 1	Nacional
Guaraní	2 - 2	Sportivo Luqueño
Silvio Pettirossi	1 - 0	Tacuary
3 de Febrero	4 - 0	12 de Octubre
Olimpia	0 - 1	Sol de América
Cerro Porteño	1 - 0	2 de Mayo

Matchday 11
Home team	Result	Away team
Sportivo Luqueño	0 - 1	Olimpia
2 de Mayo	3 - 1	Silvio Pettirossi
Nacional	1 - 0	Guaraní
Sol de América	2 - 1	3 de Febrero
12 de Octubre	2 - 2	Cerro Porteño
Tacuary	1 - 2	Libertad

Matchday 12
Home team	Result	Away team
Sportivo Luqueño	2 - 1	Sol de América
2 de Mayo	1 - 0	Libertad
3 de Febrero	1 - 0	Cerro Porteño
12 de Octubre	3 - 1	Silvio Pettirossi
Tacuary	2 - 5	Guaraní
Nacional	4 - 0	Olimpia

Matchday 13
Home team	Result	Away team
Sol de América	3 - 1	Cerro Porteño
Guaraní	1 - 1	2 de Mayo
Olimpia	2 - 2	Tacuary
Libertad	1 - 1	12 de Octubre
Silvio Pettirossi	0 - 1	3 de Febrero
Sportivo Luqueño	0 - 5	Nacional

Matchday 14
Home team	Result	Away team
3 de Febrero	0 - 4	Libertad
Tacuary	0 - 0	Sportivo Luqueño
Cerro Porteño	1 - 0	Silvio Pettirossi
Nacional	2 - 1	Sol de América
12 de Octubre	0 - 1	Guaraní
2 de Mayo	0 - 1	Olimpia

Matchday 15
Home team	Result	Away team
Nacional	0-1	Tacuary
Guaraní	0-1	3 de Febrero
Olimpia	0-0	12 de Octubre
Sol de América	4-0	Silvio Pettirossi
Libertad	2-0	Cerro Porteño
Sportivo Luqueño	1-1	2 de Mayo

Matchday 16
Home team	Result	Away team
Cerro Porteño	1-0	Guaraní
Silvio Pettirossi	0-4	Libertad
Tacuary	0-2	Sol de América
2 de Mayo	0-4	Nacional
12 de Octubre	0-3	Sportivo Luqueño
3 de Febrero	3-1	Olimpia

Matchday 17
Home team	Result	Away team
Nacional	3-1	12 de Octubre
Guaraní	1-0	Silvio Pettirossi
Sol de américa	0-1	Libertad
Tacuary	1-1	2 de Mayo
Olimpia	1-2	Cerro Porteño
Sportivo Luqueño	2-1	3 de Febrero

Matchday 18
Home team	Result	Away team
2 de Mayo	2-0	Sol de América
3 de Febrero	2-2	Nacional
Libertad	3-1	Guaraní
Cerro Porteño	3-3	Sportivo Luqueño
12 de Octubre	1-1	Tacuary
Silvio Pettirossi	2-3	Olimpia

Matchday 19
Home team	Result	Away team
Olimpia	1-2	Libertad
Sol de América	1-1	Guaraní
Nacional	0-3	Cerro Porteño
Tacuary	2-1	3 de Febrero
2 de Mayo	1-1	12 de Octubre
Sportivo Luqueño	3-3	Silvio Pettirossi

Matchday 20
Home team	Result	Away team
Libertad	4-3	Sportivo Luqueño
3 de Febrero	1-3	2 de Mayo
12 de Octubre	3-3	Sol de América
Cerro Porteño	0-0	Tacuary
Silvio Pettirossi	1-4	Nacional
Guaraní	2-0	Olimpia

Matchday 21
Home team	Result	Away team
Nacional	1-4	Libertad
Sportivo Luqueño	1-3	Guaraní
Tacuary	1-1	Silvio Pettirossi
12 de Octubre	0-0	3 de Febrero
Sol de América	2-2	Olimpia
2 de Mayo	2-1	Cerro Porteño

Matchday 22
Home team	Result	Away team
Olimpia	1 - 1	Sportivo Luqueño
Silvio Pettirossi	0 - 2	2 de Mayo
Guaraní	2 - 3	Nacional
3 de Febrero	1 - 5	Sol de América
Cerro Porteño	4 - 3	12 de Octubre
Libertad	2 - 0	Tacuary

== Top scorers ==
Pos	Player	Team	Goals
1	(Paraguay) Fabio Escobar	Nacional	13
2	(Paraguay) Julio Aguilar	12 de Octubre	12
2	(Paraguay) José Ortigoza	Sol de América	12
4	(Paraguay) Juan Eduardo Samudio	Libertad	11
4	(Argentina) Rubén Gigena	Sportivo Luqueño	11
6	(Paraguay) Ariel Bogado	Nacional	10
7	(Paraguay) José A. Franco	3 de Febrero	9
7	(Paraguay) Edison Giménez	Olimpia	9
9	(Brazil) Émerson Matías	2 de Mayo	8
10	(Paraguay) Pablo Giménez	Cerro Porteño	7
11	(Paraguay) Raúl Román	Nacional	6
11	(Argentina) Jonathan Fabbro	Guaraní	6
11	(Colombia) Vladimir Marín	Libertad	6
11	(Paraguay) Edgar Benítez Santander	Sol de América	6
11	(Paraguay) Gustavo Morinigo	Nacional	6
11	(Paraguay) Dante López	Libertad	6
Last Updated: June 29, 2008, * Scorer Stats (in Spanish)
