= Carlos Zorrilla =

Argentine footballer

Personal information
- Full name: Carlos Héctor Zorrilla
- Date of birth: 10 October 1985 (age 41)
- Place of birth: Lanús, Argentina
- Height: 1.78 m (5 ft 10 in)
- Position: Defender

Senior career*
Years	Team	Apps	(Gls)
2006–2007	Almirante Brown	8	(0)
2007	2 de Mayo	22	(1)
2008	U. de Concepción	8	(0)
2009	Puerto Montt	20	(0)
2010–2011	2 de Mayo	15	(0)
- * Club domestic league appearances and goals as of 18 March 2020

Carlos Héctor Zorrilla (born 10 October 1985) was an Argentine footballer.

He played for clubs like 2 de Mayo and U. de Concepción.
