= David Villalba =

Paraguayan footballer (born 1982)

Personal information
- Full name: David Raúl Villalba Candía
- Date of birth: 13 April 1982 (age 44)
- Place of birth: San Lorenzo, Paraguay
- Height: 1.84 m (6 ft 0 in)
- Position: Central midfielder

Senior career*
Years	Team	Apps	(Gls)
2000–2005	Club Olimpia		
2005	Sportivo Luqueño		
2006–2007	Tacuary		
2007–2008	Club Olimpia		
2008	Deportes Tolima		
2009	12 de Octubre		
2010	Blooming		
2010–2011	C.A.I.		

International career^{‡}
2001	Paraguay U20		
2004–2007	Paraguay	2	(0)
- * Club domestic league appearances and goals as of 12 June 2018 ‡ National team caps and goals as of 12 June 2018

David Raúl Villalba Candía (Note: In this Spanish name, the first or paternal surname is Villalba and the second or maternal family name is Candía.) (born 13 April 1982), known as David Villalba, is a Paraguayan association football midfielder who last played for C.A.I. of the Primera B Nacional in Argentina (2010–2011).

He previously played for Olimpia Asunción (2002–2005, 2007–2008), Sportivo Luqueño (2005), Tacuary (2006–2007) and 12 de Octubre (2009) in Paraguay, for Deportes Tolima (2008) in Colombia, and for Blooming (2010) in Bolivia.
