= Ariel Bogado =

Paraguayan footballer (born 1983)

Personal information
- Full name: Ariel Gregorio Bogado Llanos
- Date of birth: 24 December 1983 (age 42)
- Place of birth: Ñemby, Paraguay
- Height: 1.74 m (5 ft 9 in)
- Position: Striker

Senior career*
Years	Team	Apps	(Gls)
2005–2012	Nacional	47	(12)
2007	→ Sportivo Trinidense (loan)	20	(8)
2007	→ Arsenal de Sarandí (loan)	0	(0)
2008	→ Atlas (loan)	16	(7)
2009	→ Tigres UANL (loan)	14	(2)
2012–2013	Sportivo Luqueño	28	(4)
2013–2014	Ñublense	12	(1)
2015	Deportivo Capiatá	21	(2)
2016	Sportivo Trinidense	–	(–)
2018	Cerro Porteño Itapé	–	(–)
2021	General Caballero CG	–	(–)

International career
2008–2012	Paraguay	3	(1)
- * Club domestic league appearances and goals

Ariel Gregorio Bogado Llanos (born 24 December 1983) is a Paraguay former football forward who played as a striker.

== Career ==
After stints on loan with Sportivo Trinidense and Arsenal de Sarandí, Bogado came back to Nacional for the 2008 Apertura tournament of Paraguay where he was one of the top scorers with 10 goals.

In July 2008, Bogado was loaned to Atlas of Mexico, and on 10 December 2008 it was announced that Bogado was playing now for U.A.N.L. for Clausura 2009.

In the second half of 2013, Bogado left Sportivo Luqueño, moved to Chile and joined Ñublense.

In 2016, Bogado played for Sportivo Trinidense in the División Intermedia.

In April 2021, Bogado returned to football by signing with General Caballero de Campo Grande in the Paraguayan Cuarta División.

=== International goals ===
No.	Date	Venue	Opponent	Score	Result	Competition	Ref.
1.	22 February 2012	Estadio Feliciano Cáceres, Luque, Paraguay	Guatemala	2-0	2-1	Friendly Match	

== Personal life ==
Bogado is nicknamed Korea since he was a child due to his resemblance to Asian people.
