= Martín Ligüera =

Uruguayan footballer (born 1980)

Personal information
- Full name: Martín Ricardo Ligüera López
- Date of birth: 9 November 1980 (age 46)
- Place of birth: Montevideo, Uruguay
- Height: 1.72 m (5 ft 8 in)
- Position: Attacking midfielder

Team information
- Current team: Nacional (coordinator)

Youth career
- Nacional

Senior career*
Years	Team	Apps	(Gls)
1996–1999	Nacional	2	(0)
2000	Cerro	33	(14)
2001	Defensor Sporting	34	(10)
2002–2003	Fénix	53	(33)
2003–2004	Mallorca	1	(0)
2004	→ Grasshoppers (loan)	0	(0)
2004–2005	Nacional	34	(14)
2005–2006	San Luis	20	(1)
2006–2007	Alianza Lima	39	(8)
2007–2008	Nacional	33	(3)
2009–2010	Olimpia	40	(10)
2010–2011	Unión Española	58	(16)
2012–2013	Athletico Paranaense	27	(5)
2013	Joinville	13	(1)
2014–2016	Fénix	63	(14)
2016–2017	Nacional	41	(9)

International career
1995	Uruguay U15		
1999	Uruguay U20		
2002–2005	Uruguay	15	(7)

Managerial career
- 2017–2021: Nacional (youth)
- 2021: Nacional (interim)
- 2021: Nacional
- 2022–2024: Nacional (youth)
- 2024: Rentistas
- 2025: Nacional (interim)
- * Club domestic league appearances and goals

Martín Ricardo Ligüera López (born 9 November 1980) is a Uruguayan football manager and former player who played as an attacking midfielder. He is the current coordinator of Nacional.

== Club career ==
Born in Montevideo, Ligüera made his first division debut in 1997 for Uruguayan power Nacional. However it was his play with Fénix in which he scored 33 goals in 53 first division matches, which started to draw him interest from European clubs. While at Fénix his play helped convert the small Montevideo side into the revelation of the Uruguayan First division. They qualified for the 2003 Copa Libertadores, in which they had a famous 6–1 victory over Mexican side Cruz Azul with Ligüera tallying 3 goals.

Ligüera's contract was purchased by La Liga side Mallorca. His stay at the club was short-lived due to foreign player restrictions. Ligüera played one game in La Liga for Mallorca, against Sevilla FC, on 21 September 2003. He also scored in the Copa del Rey, and appeared in three UEFA Cup matches for Mallorca, starting in two of those matches. In January 2004, due to the arrival of Andrija Delibasic, he was loaned out to Grasshopper Club Zürich in order to free the non-EU seat.

After the 2004 campaign, Ligüera returned to Uruguay and Nacional to help lead the club to a league title. His play once began to draw the interest of other South American clubs, resulting in stints with San Luis in Mexico and Peruvian powerhouse Alianza Lima. While at Alianza, Martin helped the club win a Peruvian League title and participated in the Copa Libertadores.

In 2009, he signed for Olimpia of Paraguay.

== International career ==
A Uruguay full international, he also played at the 1999 FIFA World Youth Championship. He has represented his country 15 times and scored seven goals including a hat-trick on 15 August 2003 in a 5–2 victory over Iraq.

== Career statistics ==
=== International ===
Appearances and goals by national team and year
National team	Year	Apps	Goals
Uruguay	2002	1	0
Uruguay	2003	11	7
Uruguay	2004	2	0
Uruguay	2005	1	0
Total		15	7
