= Lucia Monge =

Peruvian artist and author

- Education: Rhode Island School of Design, Pontifical Catholic University of Peru
- Known for: Performance art, sculpture, teaching, lecturer.
- Website: luciamonge.com plantonmovil.org

Lucia Monge is a Peruvian artist, professor, and author currently living and working in Portland, Oregon. Her practice explores how people engage with other living beings through the intersection between art and science. For the past ten years she has organized Plantón Móvil, a yearly collaborative performance that takes the form of a “walking forest” and leads to the creation of public green areas.

Monge's recent Unearthing Futures project, in partnership with artist/engineer Xin Liu and the MIT Media Lab, launched 125 potato seeds to the International Space Station on March 7, 2020. After 30 days in Low Earth Orbit, the Peruvian potatoes that travelled to space, were planted and grown by the artists on Earth

== Plantón Móvil ==
This ongoing project started in 2010 in Lima, Peru when Monge and 60 participants mobilized with plants that were then planted in a local park. Since then, Plantón Móvil has been organized yearly in different cities including in Lima as part of the 2014 United Nations Climate Change Conference, in London with the Whitechapel Gallery, in Providence, Rhode Island in collaboration with Rhode Island School of Design students, in St. Paul by Hamline University students and in New York with the Queens Museum and NYC Parks.

== Awards and residencies ==
In 2014, Monge was a Social Innovation Fellow at Brown University and in 2018, an Eliza Moore Fellow at the Oak Spring Garden Foundation. That same year she was the recipient of an Education Partnership Grant from the Rhode Island State Council on the Arts and participated in the School Residency Program at Whitechapel Gallery. The Rocky Mountain Biological Laboratory selected Monge for their Art-Science Exchange Residency in 2016. In 2009 she participated in the Artistic Residency Program for Latin American Creators sponsored by the Mexican Secretary Of Culture. In 2019 Monge received the National Cultural Award for Artistic Production given by the Peruvian Ministry of Culture awarded to FIBRA art collective and in 2020, the Support Beam Award from the Regional Arts and Culture Council.
