= Nicolás Martínez (footballer, born 1989) =

Paraguayan footballer

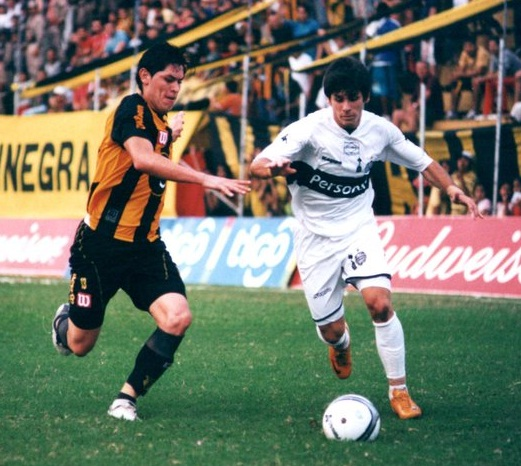

Personal information
- Full name: Alejandro Nicolás Martínez Ramos
- Date of birth: 15 February 1989 (age 37)
- Place of birth: Ñemby, Paraguay
- Height: 1.72 m (5 ft 8 in)
- Position: Forward

Team information
- Current team: Sportivo Trinidense

Youth career
- Olimpia Asunción

Senior career*
Years	Team	Apps	(Gls)
2007–2009	Olimpia Asunción	30	(5)
2009	Puebla	2	(0)
2010	Deportes Quindío	5	(0)
2010	Rubio Ñu	10	(10)
2011	Sportivo Luqueño	2	(0)
2011–2012	Juventude	20	(5)
2012	Tacuary	22	(12)
2013	Independiente del Valle	15	(3)
2013–2014	Nacional Asunción	29	(6)
2014–2016	Crucero del Norte	41	(6)
2016	Sportivo Luqueño	8	(1)
2016	Almagro	4	(0)
2017	Sportivo Trinidense	21	(7)
2017	Sol de América	6	(0)
2018–2019	Independiente FBC	31	(7)
2019	→ Ayacucho (loan)	26	(3)
2020	Municipal	9	(0)
2021–	Sportivo Trinidense	--	(--)

International career
2009	Paraguay U-20	1	(0)
- * Club domestic league appearances and goals as of 19:44, 11 May 2020 (UTC)

Alejandro Nicolás Martínez Ramos (born 15 February 1989) is a Paraguayan footballer who plays as a forward for Sportivo Trinidense in the Paraguayan División Intermedia. In 2008, he was considered one of the best young talents in Paraguayan football due to his excellent ball control, pace and technique.

== Career ==
=== Club career ===
Martínez started his career in the youth divisions of Olimpia. After playing two games for the reserve squad, he was invited to join the first team squad by coach Gustavo Costas during the 2008 Apertura tournament. He soon became a regular player in the Olimpia team, before being sold to Mexican top-tier side Puebla in 2009. In 2011, after just 2 appearances with Puebla, Martínez was sold again, this time to Brazilian fourth-division side Juventude. For the 2012 Closin' tournament is repatriated by the Tacuary, where he became one of the scorers.

In 2013, he was signed by the Ecuadorian side C.S.D. Independiente del Valle.

In 2021, Martinez joined Sportivo Trinidense for the División Intermedia season.
