= Marco Lazaga =

Paraguayan footballer (born 1983)

Personal information
- Full name: Marco Antonio Lazaga Dávalos
- Date of birth: 26 February 1983 (age 43)
- Place of birth: Nanawa, Paraguay
- Height: 1.82 m (6 ft 0 in)
- Position: Forward

Youth career
- –2003: Guaraní

Senior career*
Years	Team	Apps	(Gls)
	Mariscal López	–	(–)
2005	Sportivo San Lorenzo	–	(–)
2006	2 de Mayo	20	(6)
2007–2011	Belgrano	18	(2)
2008	→ Sportivo Luqueño (loan)	13	(0)
2008–2009	→ Olimpia (loan)	22	(9)
2009	→ General Caballero ZC (loan)		
2010	→ Cobreloa (loan)	31	(12)
2011	Everton	20	(6)
2012	Patriotas Boyacá	29	(11)
2013	León de Huánuco	6	(0)
2013	Blooming	15	(4)
2014	Olimpia	2	(0)
2014	Patriotas Boyacá	14	(3)
2015	Cúcuta Deportivo	9	(2)
2015	Manta	16	(8)
- * Club domestic league appearances and goals

Marco Antonio Lazaga Dávalos (born 26 February 1983) is a Paraguayan former professional footballer who played as a forward.

== Career ==
Lazaga was born in Nanawa. As a youth player, he was with Guaraní. He began his senior career with Mariscal López and Sportivo San Lorenzo before joining 2 de Mayo from Pedro Juan Caballero in 2006.

In 2007, Lazaga signed with the Argentine side Belgrano of Córdoba. In 2008, he returned to Paraguay to play in the Apertura tournament for Sportivo Luqueño. Lazaga also signed with Olimpia to play in the Clausura tournament, at the request of coach Gustavo Costas. In 2010 Lazaga went abroad to play for Chilean club Cobreloa. After a good year with the zorros he returned to Belgrano de Córdoba in Argentina, but after a short stint he returned to Chilean football with Everton de Viña del Mar. In 2012 Lazaga joined Colombian side Patriotas F.C. where he had good season. In 2013, he continued playing abroad having brief spells in Peru and Bolivia with León de Huánuco and Club Blooming respectively.

His last clubs were Cúcuta Deportivo in Colombia and Manta in Ecuador.

== Personal life ==
He went to jail to drive his junk yellow mercedez drunk.
