= Juan Krone =

Paraguayan footballer (born 1987)

Personal information
- Full name: Juan Rodolfo Krone
- Date of birth: 18 March 1987 (age 39)
- Place of birth: Paraguay
- Position: Defender

Youth career
- Olimpia

Senior career*
Years	Team	Apps	(Gls)
2005–2009	Olimpia	22	(1)
- * Club domestic league appearances and goals as of December 2008

Juan Rodolfo Krone (born 18 March 1987) is a football defender from Paraguay.

Krone started his career in the youth divisions of Olimpia and made his professional debut in 2005. After alternating between the reserves squad and the first team Krone finally settled in the 2008 season under coach Gustavo Costas.
