= Mauro Monges =

Paraguayan footballer (born 1983)

Mauro Milciades Monges (born 17 February 1983) is a Paraguayan former professional footballer who played as a midfielder.

== Career ==
- Sportivo San Lorenzo 2002
- Guaraní 2003
- Nacional 2004
- Rosario Central 2005
- Nacional 2006-2007
- Atlético Tembetary 2007
- Olimpia 2008
- 2 de Mayo 2009
- Deportivo Caaguazú 2009–2010
- 2 de Mayo 2011–2013
- Pacífico FC 2013
