= Ebelio Ordóñez =

Ecuadorian footballer (born 1973)

Personal information
- Full name: Ebelio Agustín Ordóñez Martínez
- Date of birth: November 3, 1973 (age 52)
- Place of birth: Esmeraldas, Ecuador
- Height: 1.87 m (6 ft 2 in)
- Position: Striker

Youth career
- 9 de Octubre

Senior career*
Years	Team	Apps	(Gls)
1993	9 de Octubre	0	(0)
1994–1995	Panamá	33	(14)
1996	Técnico Universitario	34	(11)
1997–2004	El Nacional	262	(114)
2005	Wuxi Zobon	11	(4)
2005	Emelec	14	(0)
2006–2007	El Nacional	66	(24)
2008	Deportivo Quito	32	(9)
2009	Olimpia Asunción	6	(1)
2010	Deportivo Quito	9	(0)
2011	Aucas	19	(?)

International career
1996–2007	Ecuador	19	(1)
- * Club domestic league appearances and goals

Ebelio Agustín Ordóñez Martínez (born November 3, 1973) is an Ecuadorian former professional footballer who played as a striker.

== Club career ==
Ordoñez was born in Esmeraldas. He started playing professionally for 9 de Octubre. He spent about a year playing there and already got interest from many teams because of his versatile position. He was sold to Panamá in the 1994 season. For the next season he moved to play to Tecnico Universitario, where he had a solid campaign scoring 7 goals. He was sold El Nacional becoming one of the best center forwards in Ecuador, scoring more than 70 goals with los puros criollos. He then moved to Emelec, where he had few minutes and he did not scored either. After that frustrating campaign he moved to Deportivo Quito, and helped the team win its first championship in 60 years, scoring 2 goals in 25 matches.

== International career ==
Ordoñez has played for the Ecuador national football team since 1996, appearing in 19 matches, debuting against Costa Rica. He has played in the 2001 and 2004 Copa America and several games in the FIFA World Cup qualifying rounds for 1998, 2002 and 2006.

== Honors ==
Deportivo Quito

- Serie A: 2008
