= Edgard Monge =

Nicaraguan sex offender (born 1965)

Edgard Monge (born 1965) is a native of Nicaragua who is serving a ten-year sentence in Kingston Penitentiary, Ontario, Canada, for four counts of aggravated assault after he knowingly had unprotected sex while HIV infected and failed to inform his four sexual partners. Two of his partners also became infected with HIV. One of the two had a child from the union with Monge and the child also contracted HIV. (He was also convicted of one count of unlawfully causing bodily harm to the baby by having unprotected sex with her mother.)

== Sexual relationships ==
Monge contracted HIV from his late wife, who died of AIDS complications in November 1999. She contracted the virus from a blood transfusion in Nicaragua in 1981. He learned he was HIV positive in November 1999, shortly before his wife died.

Monge commenced his first sexual relationship in January 2000, in spite of a doctor warning him about the risks and advised him to reveal his being HIV positive to potential partners and to use a condom as the protection.

Monge explained that he did not inform his sexual partners because he did not have time and because several of the women were too immature to handle the problem. The sentencing judge called the explanations "pathetic".

According to the evidence presented in court, Monge had the following overlapping unprotected sexual relationships with women:

- Victim #1: January 1, 2000 – June 30, 2000. She tested negative for HIV.
- Victim #2: June 1, 2000 – May 30, 2001. She is now HIV positive. She became pregnant and her baby contracted HIV.
- Victim #3: January 1, 2001 – June 30, 2001. Victim #3 was a teenager. She tested negative for HIV, but developed a sexually transmitted disease.
- Victim #4: February 1, 2001 – April 30, 2001. Met Monge at church. Tested HIV positive in September 2001.

In the case of Victim #2, who became pregnant from Monge, he did not tell her he was HIV positive during their relationship and did not tell her after learning she was pregnant. This prevented the mother from taking medication that might have reduced the risk of transmission of the virus to her baby girl during pregnancy. She also practised breastfeeding, perhaps unknowingly passing the virus to the baby girl that way.

According to the evidence presented in court, when one victim broke up with him Monge told her "I gave you a present that no other guy can give you. I gave you AIDS".

Monge knew he was HIV positive and took precautions to protect his four children, for example wearing latex gloves when he cooked and letting another sibling shower his youngest daughter.

Soon to be released from prison (Frontenac Institution), Monge has met a woman at a church he goes to on Sunday. They plan to be married once Monge is released and to reside in Nicaragua. The Correctional Service of Canada has denied his request for marriage.

== Sentence ==
On June 27, 2002, Justice Steve Glithero of the Ontario Superior Court of Justice sentenced Monge to ten years in prison.

The judge said:

"This is a man who carried on four sexual affairs of significant length involving frequent sex.... He knowingly and repeatedly risked the very lives of four women and a child by his callous actions which persisted over months. He's largely responsible for the ruination of three lives. The effect of his actions is tragic and immense.... His actions show a callous and cruel disregard for his own flesh and blood.... One must ask why he would date women as prospective wives and mothers, yet knowingly expose them to the risk of infection with the same condition that had resulted in the death of his wife. ... None of these were one-night stands."

== Sources ==
- "Man gets 10 years in K-W HIV case," Kitchener Waterloo Record, p. A1, June 28, 2002
- "K-W man guilty of infecting women and baby with HIV," Kitchener Waterloo Record, p. A1 April 3, 2002
- "Young mother, baby cope with HIV," Kitchener Waterloo Record, p. A4, April 3, 2002
- "Man with HIV Who Had Unprotected Sex Imprisoned," Guelph Daily Mercury, p. A2 June 28, 2002
- "Canada: Man With HIV Who Had Unprotected Sex Imprisoned," The Body July 2, 2002
- "Woman felt 'betrayed' by lover; HIV-positive man withheld deadly secret from partners, court told," ''Kitchener Waterloo Record'', p. A1 June 21, 2002
