= Ulises Coronel =

Paraguayan footballer (born 1998)

Personal information
- Full name: Ulises Ramón Coronel González
- Date of birth: 28 July 1998 (age 28)
- Place of birth: Ñemby, Paraguay
- Height: 1.76 m (5 ft 9 in)
- Position: Midfielder

Youth career
- Guaraní
- Cerro Porteño PF
- Cerro Porteño

Senior career*
Years	Team	Apps	(Gls)
2017–2018	Cerro Porteño	1	(0)
2019	Atlético Colegiales		

International career
2015	Paraguay U17		(2)
- * Club domestic league appearances and goals

Ulises Ramón Coronel González (born 28 July 1998) is a Paraguayan professional footballer who plays as a midfielder. He played for Cerro Porteño and Atlético Colegiales between 2017 and 2019. In 2015, Coronel was a member of the Paraguay U17 national team.

== Club career ==
=== Early career ===
Coronel began playing in the youth teams at Guaraní before joining the under-14 team at Cerro Porteño PF. Scout Hernan Acuña saw him there and took him to trial at Cerro Porteño.

=== Cerro Porteño ===
Coronel joined Cerro Porteño's under-15 squad when it was coached by Diego Gavilan.

==== 2016 season ====
In April 2016, Coronel scored in a 9–1 victory against River Plate Asunción in the U18 Torneo Apertura.

==== 2017 season ====
In January 2017, Coronel signed a four-year contract with Cerro Porteño and began pre-season training with the first-team. In the Cerro Porteño first-team were players Antony Silva, Nelson Valdez, Jose Ortigoza, Victor Caceres, the Argentine Diego Churín and Uruguayan Álvaro Pereira. Coronel and his youth team colleague Fabian Franco were both chosen to form part of the first-team to take part in the 2017 pre-season. To get to training, Coronel would catch the bus to take him to the Mercado 4 in Asunción and he'd walk from there to the club. During the pre-season, he scored for Cerro Porteño in a 3–0 victory against Deportivo Minga Guazu at the Estadio Antonio Aranda. In January 2017, Coronel played for the first-team in a game against Independiente CG and scored. On 5 February 2017, he made his debut in a 3–0 away victory against Rubio Ñú, being in the starting 11 players before being substituted off in the first half. He played 18 minutes of the fixture. The team were crowned champions of the 2017 Torneo Apertura. In May 2017, Coronel scored the equalizing goal in a 2–2 draw against Libertad in the APF U19 Apertura Tournament. He scored in the 84th minute of the game. In July 2017, Coronel suffered an ankle fracture and was to be intervened surgically.

==== 2018 season ====
On 25 February 2018, Coronel scored the winning goal in a 2–1 away victory for Cerro Porteño against Libertad in the Torneo de Reserva. In May 2018, he scored the opening goal in the 6th minute of the first half in a 4–3 home victory against Libertad in a reserve game. In August 2018, Coronel played in a 2–1 away victory against 3 de Febrero in the Torneo de Reserva. He played a total of 17 league games in the 2018 Torneo de Reserva, scoring 3 goals.

=== Atlético Colegiales ===
In 2019, Coronel joined Primera B side Atlético Colegiales. In June 2019, he scored the second goal for Atlético Colegiales in the 64th minute of a 2–0 away victory against Athletic Club in the Copa Paraguay. In August 2019, he played in a 3–0 loss against Olimpia Asunción in the second round of the Copa Paraguay. In September 2019, Coronel scored in a 3–1 home victory for Atlético Colegiales against Capitan Figari.

== International career ==
In June 2015, Coronel represented Paraguay at under-17 level at the Copa Mitad del Mundo in Ecuador. He appeared as a substitute and scored a double in a 7–1 victory against Universidad de San Martín.

== Personal life ==
Coronel is from the city of Ñemby. In 2017, he stated that his reference were Paraguayan footballer Marcelo Estigarribia and Belgian footballer Eden Hazard.

== Honours ==
Cerro Porteño

- Primera División: 2017 Clausura
