= Nanawa =

Nanawa Nanágua
- Town
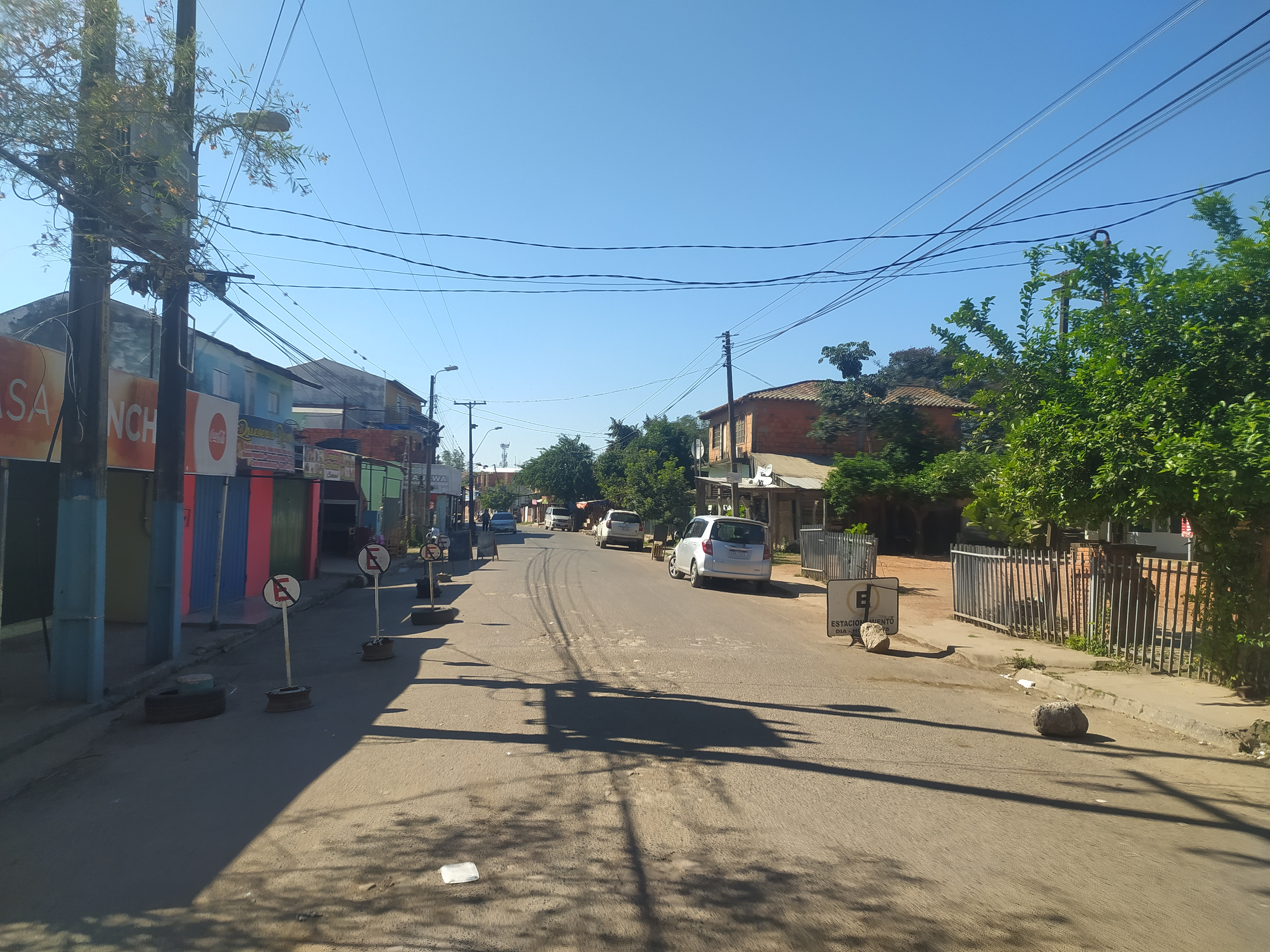

- Location within Paraguay
- Coordinates: 25°16′12″S 57°40′12″W
- Country: Paraguay
- Department: Presidente Hayes

Population (2008)
  - Total: 6,857
- Climate: Cfa

Nanawa (Guarani: Nanágua) is a town in the Presidente Hayes department of Paraguay. The urban area is divided by the Pilcomayo River from the city of Clorinda in the country of Argentina.
