= Carlos Velásquez Monge =

Guatemalan politician

Carlos Velásquez Monge is a Guatemalan politician. He served as Guatemala's Minister of Social Development and, has served as General Director of Civil Aviation of Guatemala. He was born in Guatemala City on January 9, 1983. He is an Airline Transport Pilot with more than 8,000 flight hours, has a master's degree in public administration, a degree in business administration, also with aeronautical studies in operational safety and quality assurance. On February 4, 2016, when assuming the General Directorate of Civil Aviation after decades by the state of Guatemala trying to improve its effective compliance, it manages to raise compliance with ICAO standards to 87%, surpassing all previous administrations. On April 23, 2018, he was appointed Minister of Social Development and in 2019 launched the multidimensional poverty index of Guatemala modifying the concept of poverty measurement and extreme poverty in Guatemala

[1]
