= Peter Monge =

American academic

- Education: Pacific Union College; San Jose State University; Michigan State University
- Occupation: academic
- Employer: University of Southern California

Peter Monge is an American academic that specialises in organizational communications theory and is the professor of communication in the Annenberg School of Communication and Journalism and professor of management and organization in the Marshall School of Business at the University of Southern California. Monge studies communication and knowledge networks, ecological theories, and organizational change processes.

== Early life and education ==
Monge was raised in Southern California. He graduated with a BA in theology from Pacific Union College in 1964. He began teaching as an instructor at San Jose State University while earning his MA in speech communication there. He earned his PhD in communication from Michigan State University in 1972. After professorships at San Jose State, Michigan State, and a visiting scholar position at Stanford University, he became a professor at the University of Southern California in 1983. He has been a professor at USC since 1983.

== Academic work ==
He served as editor of Communication Research from 1986 to 1993. He is a fellow (2002) and a former president of the International Communication Association (1997–1998).

Monge is the director of the Annenberg Networks Network, a research center focused on communication network theory and research. He is also an associated faculty with the Center for Effective Organizations in the Marshall School of Business.

Monge's research expertise areas include:

- organizational communication
- inter-organizational communication and information systems
- strategic alliances and their impact on work life and productivity
- participative management
- communication networks
- global network organizations
- globalization and communication
- evolutionary theory

== Professional work ==
Public sector consulting

Monge has consulted extensively in the public and private sectors. In the public sector, Monge has worked with the Army, National Aeronautics and Space Administration, and the National Cancer Institute. In addition to several public universities, Monge has worked with state and local government agencies, including the National Science Foundation, New Jersey Department of Education, San Francisco Public Libraries, and Southern California Edison.

Private sector consulting

Using organizational design and network analysis, Monge has consulted for several banking corporations, such as Bank of America and Chase-Manhattan Bank, and automaker corporations, including General Motors Corporation and Ford Motor Company. He also consulted across several other industry sectors, including agriculture, publishing, and insurance.

Selected publications

He is the author or coauthor of Theories of Communication Networks (2003) and Reasoning with Statistics (2001), and has published more than 60 articles in top journals including Academy of Management Journal, Communication Research, Journal of Communication, Management Communication Quarterly, and Organization Science. As a widely cited author, he has published theoretical and empirical research articles on organizational communication networks, evolutionary and ecological theory, collaborative information systems, globalization, and research methods.

Selected books

- Monge, P. R., & Contractor, N. S. (2003). Theories of communication networks. New York: Oxford University Press.
- Williams, F., & Monge, P.R. (2001). Reasoning with statistics: How to read quantitative research. (5th ed.). New York: Harcourt.
- Monge, P.R., & Cappella, J.N. (Eds.) (1980). Multivariate techniques in human communication research. New York: Academic Press.
- Farace, R.V., Monge, P.R., & Russell, H.M. (1977). Communicating and organizing. Reading, MA: Addison-Wesley.

Selected scholarly articles and book chapters

- Ognyanova, K., & Monge, P. (2013). A Multilevel, Multidimensional Network Model of the Media System: Production, Content, and Audiences. Communication Yearbook 37.
- Shen, C., Monge, P., & Williams, D. (2013). The evolution of online social networks: A longitudinal Study in a Massively Multiplayer Online Game. Journal of the American Society for Information Science and Technology.
- Margolin, D., Shen, C., Lee, S., Weber, M.S., Monge, P., and Fulk, J. (2012). Impact of structure, age, and codification: Evolution of the child rights NGO network, 1977–2004. Communication Research. Thousand Oaks, CA: Sage. Published on August 3, 2012 in OnlineFirst. doi:10.1177/0093650212455197.
- Lee, S. & Monge, P. (2011). The coevolution of multiplex networks in organizational communities. Journal of Communication, 61, 758–779.
- Monge, P., Lee, S., Fulk, J., Weber, M., Shen, C., Schultz, C., & Frank, L. B. (2011). Research methods for studying evolutionary and ecological processes in organizational communication. Management Communication Quarterly, 25(2), 211–251.
- Shen, C. & Monge, P. R. (June 2011). Who connects with whom? A social network analysis of an online open source software community. First Monday [Online], 16 (6).http://firstmonday.org/htbin/cgiwrap/bin/ojs/index.php/fm/article/viewArticle/3551/2991
- Monge, P., Heiss, B. M., & Margolin, D. B. (2008). Communication network evolution in organizational communities. Communication Theory, 18(4), 449–477.
- Monge, P. R., & Matei, S. (2004). The role of the global telecommunications network in bridging economic and political divides, 1989 to 1999. Journal of Communication, 54, 1–21.
- Monge, P.R., & Contractor, N.S. (2001). Emergence of communication networks. In F.M. Jablin and L.L. Putnam (Eds.), New handbook of organizational communication (pp. 440–502). Newbury Park, CA: Sage.
- Monge, P.R. & Fulk, J. (1999). Communication technology for global network organizations. In G. DeSanctis & J. Fulk (Eds.), Communication technology and organizational forms. (pp. 71–100). Thousand Oaks, CA: Sage.
- Monge, P. R., Fulk, J., Kalman, M. E., Flanagin, A. J., Parnassa, C., & Rumsey, S. (1998). Production of collective action in alliance-based interorganizational communication and information systems. Organization Science, 9(3), 411–433.
- Monge, P.R. & Contractor, N.S. (1995). Communication networks. In A. Kuper & J. Kuper (Eds.), Social Science Encyclopedia (2nd Ed., pp 108–109). London, England: Routledge.
- Monge, P. R., Cozzens, M. D., & Contractor, N. S. (1992). Communication and motivational predictors of the dynamics of organizational innovation. Organization Science, 3(2), 250–274.
- Monge, P.R., Cozzens, M., & Contractor, N.S. (1992). Communication and motivational predictors of the dynamics of organizational innovation. Organization Science, 3, 250–274.
- Monge, P.R. (1987). Communication at the network level. In C.R. Berger and S. Chaffee (Eds.), Handbook of communication science (pp. 239–270). Newbury Park, CA: Sage.
- Monge, P.R., & Eisenberg, E.M. (1987). Emergent communication networks. In F.M. Jablin, L.L. Putnam, K.H. Roberts, and L.W. Porter, (Eds.), Handbook of organizational communication (pp. 304–342). Newbury Park, CA: Sage
- Monge, P.R., and Miller, G.R. (1985). Communication networks. In A. Kuper and J. Kuper (Eds.), The Social Science Encyclopaedia (pp. 130–132). Runsburgerweg, The Netherlands: Routledge and Kegan Paul.
- Monge, P.R. (1980). Multivariate Multiple Regression. In P.R. Monge & J.N. Cappella (Eds.), Multivariate techniques in human communication research. New York: Academic Press.
- Monge, P.R. (1973). Theory construction in the study of human communication: The system paradigm. Journal of Communication, 23, 5–16.
- Monge, P.R., & Day, P.D. (1976). Multivariate analysis in communication research. Human Communication Research, 2, 207–220

== Awards ==
He has received a number of awards including International Communication Association (ICA) president (1997–1998), ICA Fellow, ICA B Aubrey Fisher Mentorship award in 2006, National Communication Association (NCA) Distinguished Scholar in 2012, and Stephen H. Chaffee Career Achievement award in 2012, and the NCA Presidential Citation Award in 1998.

He has also received the Distinguished Scholar award from the Organizational Communication and Information Systems Division of the Academy of Management, the Research Award from the Organizational Communication Division of the National Communication Association.

In 2008 he received the Distinguished Article Award in Communication and Social Cognition and in 2009 he received the Dennis Gouran Research Award for the Best Published Article in Group Communication. Furthermore, Monge was awarded the Career of Outstanding Contributions Award from the Organizational Communication and Information System Division of the Academy of Management in 2012.

Monge has presented more than a dozen top three papers at conferences over the years. Eight of his doctoral advisees have won dissertation of the year awards.

== Grants ==
The research Monge has undertaken has been on the topics of organizational systems, communication networks, and evolutionary theory. His work has been supported by a number of major funding agencies, including the National Science Foundation, the Office of Naval Research, the Department of Energy, the National Cancer Institute, and the National Aeronautics and Space Administration.
