= Reinaldo Ocampo =

Paraguayan footballer (born 1987)

Personal information
- Full name: Reinaldo David Ocampo
- Date of birth: 6 January 1987 (age 39)
- Place of birth: Asunción, Paraguay
- Height: 1.75 m (5 ft 9 in)
- Position: Midfielder

Team information
- Current team: General Díaz

Senior career*
Years	Team	Apps	(Gls)
2006–2008	Libertad	0	(0)
2008–2009	Tacuary	42	(10)
2009	Libertad	15	(1)
2010	Tacuary	36	(8)
2011	Rubio Ñu	20	(6)
2011–2012	Sol de América	25	(3)
2012–2013	Tacuary	19	(1)
2013	→ Sportivo Luqueño (loan)	14	(1)
2014–	General Díaz		

International career^{‡}
2012–	Paraguay	3	(0)
- * Club domestic league appearances and goals as of 5 April 2014 ‡ National team caps and goals as of 26 April 2012

Reinaldo Ocampo (born 6 January 1987) is a Paraguayan international footballer who plays for General Díaz, as a midfielder.

== Career ==
Born in Asunción, Ocampo has played club football for Libertad, Tacuary, Rubio Ñu and Sol de América.

He made his international debut for Paraguay in 2012.
