= Edison Giménez =

Paraguayan footballer (born 1981)

Personal information
- Full name: Mario Edison Giménez
- Date of birth: 5 April 1981 (age 45)
- Place of birth: Pedro Juan Caballero, Paraguay
- Height: 1.80 m (5 ft 11 in)
- Position: Striker

Senior career*
Years	Team	Apps	(Gls)
2002–2003	General Díaz	21	(11)
2004–2006	2 de Mayo	71	(27)
2005	→ Candelaria (loan)	–	(–)
2007	Colo-Colo	13	(1)
2007–2008	Olimpia	49	(16)
2009	Deportivo Pereira	30	(11)
2010	Independiente Medellín	17	(8)
2010–2011	Deportivo Cali	10	(1)
2011	Sportivo Luqueño	14	(2)
2011	Imbabura SC	9	(0)
2012	La Equidad	14	(2)
2013	Itagüí	4	(0)
2013–2014	Nacional Potosí	26	(1)
2014–2015	Deportivo Pereira	53	(12)
2016	Unión Magdalena	20	(3)
Total		351	(95)

International career
2006–2007	Paraguay	2	(1)
- * Club domestic league appearances and goals

Mario Edison Giménez (born 5 April 1981 in Pedro Juan Caballero) is a former Paraguayan footballer who played as a striker.

== Career ==
He began his football career at 2 de Mayo of the first tier of his country, in where scored 25 goals in 31 appearances during two seasons. In January 2007, was sold to Chilean Primera División club Colo-Colo, for a US$400.000 transfer fee. After a regular pass at the Chilean club that was runner-up of the 2006 Copa Sudamericana, he joined to Paraguayan powerhouse Club Olimpia along with his countrymen Gilberto Velásquez in June, after of proclaiming champion of the Apertura Tournament.

In January 2009, he traveled to Colombia and signed for Deportivo Pereira of the country's first tier, after having also spells at Independiente Medellín and Deportivo Cali of the same country. In 2011, he returned to Paraguay and joined Sportivo Luqueño, after moving to Ecuadorian side Imbabura SC. The next season, Giménez signed for La Equidad.

Giménez also represented the Paraguay national football team in 2006, playing after the FIFA World Cup of that year. He scored one international goal in a 3–2 defeat with Chile at Estadio Sausalito during a friendly match. And also in 2007 playing another friendly against México in Monterrey, he entered the 77th minute by Salvador Cabañas being sent off eight minutes later.

=== International goals ===
Goal	Date	Venue	Opponent	Score	Result	Competition
1	15 November 2006	Estadio Sausalito, Viña del Mar, Chile	Chile	3–2	3–2	Friendly

== Honours ==
Colo-Colo

- Primera División de Chile (1): 2007 Apertura

Deportivo Cali

- Copa Colombia (1): 2010
