= Luis Prieto (Paraguayan footballer) =

Paraguayan footballer (born 1988)

Personal information
- Full name: Luis Carlos Prieto Zayas
- Date of birth: 20 April 1988 (age 38)
- Place of birth: Encarnación, Paraguay
- Height: 1.85 m (6 ft 1 in)
- Position: Defender

Senior career*
| Years | Team | Apps | (Gls) |
| 2008–2010 | Olimpia | 12 | (1) |
| 2011 | Sportivo Trinidense | – | (–) |
| 2012 | Resistencia | – | (–) |
| 2012–2014 | Magallanes | 33 | (4) |
| 2014 | Inti Gas | 13 | (0) |
| 2015–2016 | Ayacucho | 17 | (2) |
| 2016 | Sportivo San Lorenzo | – | (–) |
| 2017 | 22 de Setiembre | – | (–) |
- * Club domestic league appearances and goals

Luis Carlos Prieto Zayas (born 20 April 1988) is a Paraguayan former footballer.
