= Diego Ciz =

Uruguayan footballer (born 1981)

Personal information
- Full name: Diego Nicolás Ciz Vaz Torres
- Date of birth: May 31, 1981 (age 45)
- Place of birth: Montevideo, Uruguay
- Height: 1.73 m (5 ft 8 in)
- Position: Left back

Youth career
- Peñarol

Senior career*
Years	Team	Apps	(Gls)
2005–2006	Rocha	50	(1)
2007–2010	Olimpia Asunción	78	(1)
2010	→ Rapid Bucharest (loan)	10	(0)
2011–2012	Sol de América	71	(4)
2013–2014	Sportivo Luqueño	35	(0)
2014–2015	Rubio Ñu	39	(0)
2016	River Plate Asunción	26	(1)
- * Club domestic league appearances and goals as of 26 December 2016

Diego Nicolás Ciz Vaz Torres (born May 31, 1981) is a former football defender from Uruguay.

== Career ==
Ciz started his career in the youth divisions of Peñarol but was released and went on to sign for Rocha F.C. where he made his debut in professional football. While in Rocha, Ciz was part of the team that won the 2005 Apertura.

In 2007 Ciz was transferred to the giant club Olimpia of Paraguay.

In early 2010, after not having much chances to play with Olimpia, he was loaned to the Romanian side Rapid Bucharest.

On 19 December 2010, Ciz has signed a two-year contract with Paraguayan side Sol de América.

== See also ==
- List of expatriate footballers in Paraguay
- Players and Records in Paraguayan Football
