= José Ramírez (footballer, born 1977) =

Argentine footballer (born 1977)

Personal information
- Full name: José Fabián Ramírez
- Date of birth: February 3, 1977 (age 49)
- Place of birth: Esquina, Corrientes, Argentina
- Position: Goalkeeper

Senior career*
Years	Team	Apps	(Gls)
1999	San Lorenzo	2	(0)
2000	Almagro	4	(0)
2001–2005	San Lorenzo	68	(0)
2005–2006	Quilmes	41	(0)
2007	Ionikos	12	(0)
2007–2008	Olimpo	15	(0)
2008	Olimpia	9	(0)
2009	Almagro	13	(0)
2009–2010	Godoy Cruz	2	(0)
2010–2011	Defensa y Justicia	4	(0)
- * Club domestic league appearances and goals

José Fabián Ramírez (born 3 February 1977 in Esquina, Corrientes) is an Argentine football goalkeeper.

He played for most part of his career in Argentine teams such as San Lorenzo, Almagro, Quilmes and Olimpo. He also played in Greece for Ionikos F.C. and for Olimpia Asunción in the Paraguay first division.
