= Luis Monge (footballer) =

Argentine footballer

Personal information
- Full name: Luis Alberto Monge Alauy
- Date of birth: 27 January 1992 (age 34)
- Place of birth: Santiago del Estero, Argentina
- Height: 1.70 m (5 ft 7 in)
- Position: Defender

Team information
- Current team: Talleres RE

Youth career
- Tiro Suizo
- 2004–2013: River Plate

Senior career*
Years	Team	Apps	(Gls)
2013–2014	Defensores de Belgrano	36	(0)
2014–2015	Barracas Central	48	(0)
2016–2017	Fénix	18	(1)
2016–2017	→ Atlanta (loan)	10	(0)
2017–2019	Acassuso	73	(0)
2019–2020	Los Andes	22	(2)
2020–	Talleres RE	53	(4)
- * Club domestic league appearances and goals as of 16:10, 7 August 2022 (UTC)

Luis Alberto Monge Alauy (born 27 January 1992) is an Argentine professional footballer who plays as a defender for Talleres Remedios

== Career ==
Monge played at youth level for Tiro Suizo and River Plate. Monge departed in June 2013, signing for Primera B Metropolitana's Defensores de Belgrano. He featured thirty-eight times in the 2013–14 campaign, as he also received the first red card on his senior career on 10 November against Deportivo Armenio. On 30 June 2014, Monge joined Barracas Central. He made his bow in a home draw with UAI Urquiza on 8 August, on the way to fifty matches across two seasons. Fénix became Monge's third club in January 2016. Eighteen appearances came, as did his first goal in 2016's penultimate game versus Deportivo Riestra.

Having spent the 2016–17 campaign on loan with Atlanta, Monge switched Fénix for Acassuso on 27 July 2017. He played every minute of the club's thirty-four fixtures in his debut season as they reached the promotion play-offs; where they would get eliminated by UAI Urquiza in round one.

== Career statistics ==
As of 5 April 2019.

Appearances and goals by club, season and competition
Club	Season	League			Cup		Continental		Other		Total	
Club	Season	Division	Apps	Goals	Apps	Goals	Apps	Goals	Apps	Goals	Apps	Goals
Defensores de Belgrano	2013–14	Primera B Metropolitana	36	0	2	0	—		0	0	38	0
Barracas Central	2014	Primera B Metropolitana	17	0	0	0	—		1 (Note: Appearance(s) in the Primera B Metropolitana play-offs)	0	18	0
Barracas Central	2015	Primera B Metropolitana	31	0	1	0	—		0	0	32	0
Barracas Central	Total		48	0	1	0	—		1	0	50	0
Fénix	2016	Primera B Metropolitana	18	1	0	0	—		0	0	18	1
Fénix	2016–17	Primera B Metropolitana	0	0	0	0	—		0	0	0	0
Fénix	Total		18	1	0	0	—		0	0	18	1
Atlanta (loan)	2016–17	Primera B Metropolitana	10	0	1	0	—		0	0	11	0
Acassuso	2017–18	Primera B Metropolitana	33	0	0	0	—		1	0	34	0
Acassuso	2018–19	Primera B Metropolitana	31	0	0	0	—		0	0	31	0
Acassuso	Total		64	0	0	0	—		1	0	65	0
Career total			176	1	4	0	—		2	0	182	1
