= Franco Mendoza =

Argentine footballer

Personal information
- Full name: Franco Daniel Mendoza Bazán
- Date of birth: 18 August 1981 (age 45)
- Place of birth: Sunchales, Argentina
- Height: 1.80 m (5 ft 11 in)
- Position: Striker

Team information
- Current team: Ben Hur

Senior career*
Years	Team	Apps	(Gls)
2000–2005	Atlético de Rafaela	70	(25)
2005–2006	Banfield	14	(4)
2006	Godoy Cruz	13	(5)
2007	Atlante	12	(2)
2007–2008	Huracán	27	(6)
2008	Olimpia		
2009–2010	Emelec	9	(5)
2010–2011	Total Chalaco		
2011	Arsenal de Sarandí	5	(0)
2011–2012	Gimnasia y Esgrima (LP)	15	(3)
2012–2013	Santamarina	6	(1)
2013	Gimnasia y Tiro	9	(0)
2013–2014	Libertad	21	(6)
2014–	Ben Hur		
- * Club domestic league appearances and goals

Franco Daniel Mendoza (born 18 August 1981 in Sunchales) is an Argentine football striker currently playing for Ben Hur.

Mendoza started his playing career in 2000 with Atlético de Rafaela in the Argentine 2nd division. In 2002-2003 the club won the league and obtained promotion to the Argentine Primera. Atlético were relegated after one season, but Mendoza stayed on with the club until 2005.

Mendoza was signed by Primera division side Banfield in 2005, he then joined Godoy Cruz in 2006 and Mexican club Atlante in 2007.

Mendoza joined newly promoted Huracán in 2007, and helped the club to finish in the top half of the table in the Apertura 2007, and finished as the clubs topscorer in the tournament.

On 2009 Mendoza joined Ecuadorian Emelec.

Mendoza has become known for coming off the bench in the 2nd half of tied games and delivering the knockout goal for his team both in the local tournament and in la Copa Sudamericana 2009.

== Titles ==
Season	Team	Title
2002–2003	Atlético de Rafaela	Primera B Nacional
