= Darío Caballero =

Paraguayan footballer (born 1977)

Personal information
- Full name: Darío Raúl Caballero Leyva
- Date of birth: 1 January 1977 (age 49)
- Place of birth: Luque, Paraguay
- Height: 1.80 m (5 ft 11 in)
- Position: Defender

Senior career*
Years	Team	Apps	(Gls)
1997–2000	Cerro Porteño	?	(?)
2000–2001	Chacarita Juniors	31	(0)
2001–2003	Cerro Porteño	?	(?)
2004	Independiente	15	(1)
2004	Cerro Porteño	?	(?)
2005	Libertad	?	(?)
2005–2006	Deportivo Cali	?	(?)
2007	Universitario de Deportes	?	(2)
2007	Olimpia	?	(?)
2008	Deportivo Quito	?	(?)
2008–2009	Olimpia	34	(2)
2010	Fernando de la Mora	31	(0)
- * Club domestic league appearances and goals as of November 2008

Darío Rául Caballero (born 1 January 1977) is a retired Paraguayan football defender.

Caballero spent most of his years playing for Paraguayan teams such as Cerro Porteño, Libertad and Olimpia, but also played for teams in Argentina, Colombia, Ecuador and Peru.

He last played for Club Fernando de la Mora before retiring in 2011 at the age of 34.
