= Osmar Molinas =

Paraguayan footballer (born 1987)

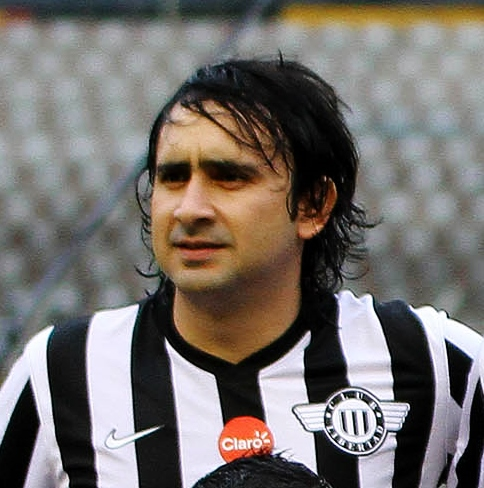
- Molinas with Libertad in 2015

Personal information
- Full name: Osmar de la Cruz Molinas González
- Date of birth: 3 May 1987 (age 39)
- Place of birth: Capiatá, Paraguay
- Height: 1.80 m (5 ft 11 in)
- Position: Central midfielder

Youth career
- 2001–2004: Olimpia

Senior career*
Years	Team	Apps	(Gls)
2005–2011	Olimpia	151	(3)
2011–2012	Colo-Colo	14	(0)
2012	Colo-Colo B	6	(1)
2012–2017	Libertad	122	(0)
2017	→ Sol de América (loan)	20	(0)
2018	Independiente FBC	9	(0)
2018	Deportivo Santaní	16	(0)
2019	Deportivo Capiatá	9	(0)
2020	12 de Octubre	8	(0)
2021	River Plate Asunción	24	(0)
2022	12 de Octubre	18	(0)
2022	Resistencia	15	(0)
2023	Recoleta	0	(0)
2024	Fernando de la Mora	27	(0)
Total		439	(4)

International career
2009–2015	Paraguay	10	(0)
- * Club domestic league appearances and goals

Osmar de la Cruz Molinas González (Spanish pronunciation: [osˈmaɾ moˈlinas], born 3 May 1987) is a Paraguayan former football central midfielder.

== Club career ==
Molinas started his career in the youth divisions of Olimpia and made his professional debut in 2006.

== International career ==
Molinas also has been called to the Under-23 Paraguay national football team in several occasions.

== Post-retirement ==
Following his retirement in 2025, Molinas served as a scout for Sol de América and later assumed as sport manager. He also serves as a football agent.
