= Édgar González (footballer, born 1979) =

Paraguayan footballer

Edgar González
Personal information
- Full name: Edgar Daniel González Brítez
- Date of birth: 4 October 1979 (age 47)
- Place of birth: Itapé, Paraguay
- Height: 1.75 m (5 ft 9 in)
- Position: Midfielder

Senior career*
Years	Team	Apps	(Gls)
2000–2005	Club Guaraní	110	(12)
2002	→ Deportivo Recoleta	15	(0)
2006–2007	Cerro Porteño	42	(1)
2007–2010	Estudiantes	18	(0)
2008–2009	→ Olimpia (loan)	15	(1)
2009–2010	→ Alianza Lima (loan)	41	(4)
2010–2012	Alianza Lima	72	(5)
2012–2013	Cerro Porteño	6	(0)

International career
2003–2008	Paraguay	14	(0)
- * Club domestic league appearances and goals

Edgar Daniel González Brítez (born 4 October 1979) is a Paraguayan former footballer who played as a defensive midfielder.

== Career ==
In June 2007, González was selected for the Paraguay national football team that competed in the 2007 Copa America. After that tournament, he was transferred to the Argentine side Estudiantes de La Plata. Having no opportunity to play, he moved on loan to Olimpia.

In September, González was again loaned out to Alianza Lima.
