= Orlando Bordón =

Paraguayan footballer (born 1986)

Personal information
- Full name: Orlando Rubén Bordón
- Date of birth: 7 August 1986 (age 40)
- Place of birth: Asunción, Paraguay
- Height: 1.84 m (6 ft 0 in)
- Position: Midfielder

Team information
- Current team: CD Comercio
- Number: 15

Youth career
- Olimpia

Senior career*
Years	Team	Apps	(Gls)
2008–2009	Olimpia	10	(0)
2010	Nacional	8	(3)
2011–2013	Juventud Unida	15	(3)
2014	FC Jūrmala	10	(2)
2014–	CD Comercio	?	(?)
- * Club domestic league appearances and goals as of 31 January 2015

Orlando Rubén Bordón (born 7 August 1986 in Asunción) is a football midfielder from Paraguay, who currently plays for CD Comercio in the Torneo Argentino B.

== Career ==
Bordón started his career in the youth divisions of Olimpia and made his professional debut in 2008 under coach Gustavo Costas. In the first half of 2014 Bordón played for FC Jūrmala in the Latvian Higher League. Bordón also has been called to the Under-23 Paraguay national football team in several occasions.
