= Juan Manuel Lucero =

Argentine footballer (born 1985)

Personal information
- Full name: Juan Manuel Lucero Campos
- Date of birth: 26 May 1985 (age 41)
- Place of birth: Mendoza, Argentina
- Height: 1.76 m (5 ft 9 in)
- Position: Winger

Senior career*
| Years | Team | Apps | (Gls) |
| 2001–2004 | Coquimbo Unido | 48 | (7) |
| 2005 | Colo Colo | 13 | (2) |
| 2006–2007 | Coquimbo Unido | 38 | (2) |
| 2008 | Cobresal | 9 | (0) |
| 2008–2009 | Olimpia | 30 | (1) |
| 2009–2010 | Colón | 18 | (1) |
| 2011–2014 | Cerro Porteño | 22 | (1) |
| 2013 | → Portuguesa (loan) | 6 | (1) |
| 2013 | → Quilmes (loan) | 2 | (0) |
| 2014 | → Sportivo Luqueño (loan) | 9 | (1) |
| 2014–2015 | Independiente Rivadavia | 5 | (0) |
| 2015 | Gutiérrez SC | 4 | (0) |
| 2015 | San Marcos | 0 | (0) |
| 2016 | Iberia | 26 | (1) |
| 2017–2018 | 22 de Septiembre | | |
- * Club domestic league appearances and goals

Juan Manuel Lucero Campos (born 26 May 1985) is an Argentine naturalized Chilean former professional footballer who played as a winger for clubs in Chile, Argentina, Paraguay and Brazil.

== Career ==
Lucero played for different Chilean clubs such as Coquimbo Unido, Colo-Colo and Cobresal of the first division. In 2008, he was transferred to Club Olimpia of Paraguay. In Olimpia, he was a fan favorite due to his good skills.

He was transferred to Colón de Santa Fe in July 2009.

== Personal life ==
Lucero naturalized Chilean by residence.
