= Emmanuel Fernandes Francou =

Argentine football player

Personal information
- Full name: Emmanuel Gaspa Fernandes Francou
- Date of birth: January 31, 1986 (age 40)
- Place of birth: Villa Sarmiento, Argentina
- Height: 1.79 m (5 ft 10 in)
- Position: Centre forward

Team information
- Current team: Agropecuario Argentino

Youth career
- Vélez Sársfield

Senior career*
Years	Team	Apps	(Gls)
2005–2010	Vélez Sársfield	25	(2)
2008	→ Olimpia (loan)	14	(2)
2009	→ Talleres (loan)	15	(3)
2009–2010	→ Gimnasia de Jujuy (loan)	26	(4)
2010–2012	Asteras Tripolis	19	(3)
2012–2013	AEL	11	(2)
2013–2014	Nueva Chicago	17	(0)
2014–	Agropecuario Argentino		
- * Club domestic league appearances and goals as of 23:12, 8 July 2013 (UTC)

Emmanuel Fernandes Francou (born 31 January 1986 in Villa Sarmiento) is an Argentine football player, who plays for Agropecuario Argentino.

Fernandes Francou started his career in Vélez Sársfield, after becoming the all-time leading top-scorer in the Vélez youth divisions; scoring a total of 118 goals. Unable to find space in the first team, he was loaned to Olimpia (in Paraguay), Talleres and Gimnasia de Jujuy, both of these in the Argentine second division. Fernandes Francou was released from his contract with Vélez in 2010. Manager Player Marcos Garzia Argentine Manager Players.From 2010 till June 2012 Francou played for Asteras Tripolis in Super League Greece. In September 2012 he signed in AEL as free agent in order to help the greatest provincial team in Greece to return in Super League.
