= Matías Espíndola =

Argentine footballer

Personal information
- Full name: Matías Román Espíndola
- Date of birth: 26 November 2003 (age 22)
- Place of birth: Florida, Buenos Aires Province, Argentina
- Height: 1.77 m (5 ft 10 in)
- Position: Midfielder

Team information
- Current team: Necaxa
- Number: 21

Youth career
- Tigre

Senior career*
Years	Team	Apps	(Gls)
2023–2025	Tigre	9	(0)
2025–2026	Deportivo Maldonado	54	(7)
2026–	Necaxa	9	(2)
- * Club domestic league appearances and goals as of 17:32, 13 October 2026 (UTC)

Matías Román Espíndola (born 26 November 2003) is an Argentine professional footballer who plays as a midfielder for Liga MX club Necaxa.

== Club career ==
=== Tigre ===
Espíndola came through the youth setup at Tigre, signing his first professional contract on 9 January 2023. He made his Liga Profesional debut on 26 September 2023 in a 0–0 draw against San Lorenzo, coming on as a substitute in the second half for Aarón Molinas, after initially making his debut for the club on 3 May 2023 against Academia Puerto Cabello in the Copa Sudamericana.

=== Deportivo Maldonado ===
Ahead of the 2025 season, he moved abroad to Uruguayan Segunda División side Deportivo Maldonado. On 8 March, he scored in the first game of the season as his side beat Fénix 2–0. Deportivo Maldonado were promoted after they beat Atenas in the playoff final.

=== Necaxa ===
In July 2026, Espíndola joined Liga MX club Necaxa on a four-year contract. He scored his first goal in the Leagues Cup on 9 August in a 3–1 defeat to Philadelphia Union. He scored his first league goal shortly after on 17 August in a 2–1 defeat to León. On 11 October, he scored again, helping Necaxa to a 2–0 win over Pachuca.

== Personal life ==
Espíndola is the nephew of Juan Román Riquelme.

== Career statistics ==
As of 12 October 2026

Appearances and goals by club, season and competition
Club	Season	League			Cup (Note: Includes Copa Uruguay and Copa de la Liga AUF)		Continental (Note: Includes Copa Sudamericana)		Other		Total	
Club	Season	Division	Goals	Apps	Apps	Goals	Apps	Goals	Apps	Goals	Apps	Goals
Tigre	2023	Liga Profesional	2	0	—		1	0	—		3	0
Tigre	2024	Liga Profesional	7	0	—		—		—		7	0
Tigre	Total		9	0	0	0	1	0	0	0	10	0
Deportivo Maldonado	2025	Uruguayan Segunda División	36	5	1	1	—		—		37	6
Deportivo Maldonado	2026	Liga AUF	18	2	1	0	—		—		19	2
Deportivo Maldonado	Total		54	7	2	1	0	0	0	0	56	8
Necaxa	2026–27	Liga MX	9	2	—		—		2 (Note: Appearances in Leagues Cup)	1	11	3
Career total			72	9	2	1	1	0	2	1	77	11
