= Cristian Leiva =

Argentine footballer (born 1977)

Cristián Leiva
Personal information
- Full name: Cristián Gustavo Leiva
- Date of birth: September 26, 1977 (age 49)
- Place of birth: Chilecito, Argentina
- Height: 1.77 m (5 ft 9 1/2 in)
- Position: Defensive midfielder

Team information
- Current team: Americo Tesorieri

Senior career*
Years	Team	Apps	(Gls)
2001–2002	Banfield	46	(0)
2002	Cruz Azul	18	(0)
2003	Gimnasia y Esgrima (LP)	10	(0)
2003–2006	Banfield	88	(3)
2006–2008	Anderlecht	5	(0)
2007–2008	→ Charleroi (loan)	34	(0)
2008	Olimpia	15	(1)
2009	Godoy Cruz	19	(1)
2009–2010	San Lorenzo	25	(1)
2010–2011	Arsenal de Sarandi	17	(0)
2011–2012	Huracán	30	(0)
2012–2014	Banfield	28	(0)
2014–	Americo Tesorieri		
Total		335	(6)
- * Club domestic league appearances and goals as of 23 April 2015

Cristian Gustavo Leiva (born 26 September 1977) is an Argentine football midfielder who plays for Americo Tesorieri.
