= Gilberto Velásquez =

Paraguayan footballer (born 1983)

Gilberto Velázquez
Personal information
- Full name: Gilberto Ariel Velázquez Gómez
- Date of birth: 11 March 1983 (age 43)
- Place of birth: Asunción, Paraguay
- Height: 1.80 m (5 ft 11 in)
- Position: Centre back

Youth career
- 1997–2002: Guaraní

Senior career*
Years	Team	Apps	(Gls)
2003–2009	Guaraní	122	(5)
2007	→ Colo-Colo (loan)	4	(0)
2007–2009	→ Olimpia (loan)	32	(5)
2010–2011	Nacional	24	(1)
2011	3 de Febrero	21	(0)
2012	Rubio Ñu	15	(0)
2012	Real Cartagena	7	(0)
2013–2014	Tacuary	8	(1)
2015	Atletico Minero		
2015–2016	Sport Boys Warnes		
2017	Royal Pari		

International career
2003	Paraguay U20	3	(1)
2004	Paraguay U23		
2004	Paraguay	2	(0)
- * Club domestic league appearances and goals

Gilberto Ariel Velázquez Gómez (born 11 March 1983) is a former Paraguayan footballer who played as a centre-back.

== Club career ==
Velásquez began his career at Guaraní and was promoted to the first team in January 2002, aged 19, in where he played more than 50 games and scored three goals. In January 2007, he was loaned out to Chilean Primera División club Colo-Colo along with his countrymen Edison Giménez, team that had a very successful season, being runner-up of the Copa Sudamericana. However, he only played four games in the Apertura Tournament, but was champion of that tournament.

In June 2007, he leave the Chilean club to return to his country to play on loan for Olimpia, another successful team in where he has played. Two seasons later, he joined to Nacional and shortly after he signed for 3 de Febrero.

After ending his contract with Guaraní, Velázquez signed with Nacional.

In 2012, Velázquez signed with Colombian club Real Cartagena.

His last clubs were Sport Boys Warnes and Royal Pari in Bolivia. He retired in 2017.

== International career ==
He represented to the Paraguay national under-20 football team in the 2003 FIFA World Youth Championship held in United Arab Emirates, playing only three games in that tournament. The next year, he played two friendly games with his national team against South Korea and Mexico.

== Honours ==
Colo-Colo

- Primera División de Chile (1): 2007 Apertura
