= Raúl Amarilla (footballer, born 1988) =

Paraguayan footballer

Personal information
- Full name: Raúl Vicente Amarilla Romero
- Date of birth: 12 June 1988 (age 38)
- Place of birth: Asunción, Paraguay
- Height: 1.88 m (6 ft 2 in)
- Position: Striker

Team information
- Current team: Puertollano

Youth career
- Olimpia

Senior career*
Years	Team	Apps	(Gls)
2007–2008	Olimpia	16	(3)
2009	Écija	?	(?)
2009–2011	Cádiz B		
2011	3 de Febrero	4	(0)
2011–2012	Atlético Baleares		
2013–	Puertollano		
- * Club domestic league appearances and goals as of December 2008

Raúl Vicente Amarilla Romero (born 12 June 1988, in Asunción), also known as Raúl Amarilla, is a football striker from Paraguay and son of former star player Raúl Vicente Amarilla.

Amarilla started his career in the youth divisions of Olimpia and made his professional debut in the first team squad in 2007 at the age of 19.

For the 2009 season, Amarilla moved on loan to Écija Balompié of Spain. In the 2011 season, he moved to CD Atlético Baleares.
