= Ever Caballero =

Paraguayan footballer (born 1982)

Personal information
- Full name: Ever Alexis Caballero
- Date of birth: 27 April 1982 (age 44)
- Place of birth: Asunción, Paraguay
- Height: 1.85 m (6 ft 1 in)
- Position: Goalkeeper

Team information
- Current team: Rubio Ñu
- Number: 12

Senior career*
Years	Team	Apps	(Gls)
2004	Olimpia	5	(0)
2004	Querétaro	13	(0)
2005	Bolívar	8	(0)
2006	The Strongest	10	(0)
2006–2007	Sportivo Luqueño	16	(0)
2008	12 de Octubre	22	(0)
2008–2009	Olimpia	6	(0)
2009	2 de Mayo	13	(0)
2010	Nacional	1	(0)
2011	Deportes Copiapó	8	(0)
2012–2013	Sportivo Luqueño	15	(0)
2014–2015	Olimpia	6	(0)
2016–2017	Guaraní	3	(0)
2018	The Strongest	2	(0)
2019	Sportivo Luqueño	3	(0)
2020	General Díaz	3	(0)
2023	2 de Mayo	3	(0)
2024–	Rubio Ñu	7	(0)
- * Club domestic league appearances and goals as of 30 August 2024

Ever Alexis Caballero (born 27 April 1982 in Asunción, Paraguay) is a Paraguayan footballer who plays as a goalkeeper for Rubio Ñu.

== Teams ==
- (Paraguay) Olimpia 2002–2004
- (Mexico) Querétaro 2005
- (Bolivia) Bolívar 2005–2006
- (Bolivia) The Strongest 2006
- (Paraguay) Sportivo Luqueño 2006–2007
- (Paraguay) 12 de Octubre 2008
- (Paraguay) Olimpia 2008–2009
- (Paraguay) 2 de Mayo 2009
- (Paraguay) Nacional 2010
- (Chile) Deportes Copiapó 2011
- (Paraguay) Sportivo Luqueño 2012–2013
- (Paraguay) Olimpia 2014–2016
- (Paraguay) Guaraní 2016–2017
- (Bolivia) The Strongest 2018
- (Paraguay) Sportivo Luqueño 2019

== Titles ==
- (Paraguay) Sportivo Luqueño 2007 (Torneo Apertura)
- (Paraguay) Olimpia 2002 (Copa Libertadores)
