= Club 2 de Mayo =

Paraguayan football club

2 de Mayo
- Full name: Club Sportivo 2 de Mayo
- Nicknames: El Gallo Norteño (The Northern Rooster); El 2 (The 2)
- Founded: 6 December 1935; 90 years ago
- Ground: Monumental Río Parapití, Pedro Juan Caballero
- Capacity: 25,000
- Chairman: Marcos Ramón Cano
- Manager: Eduardo Ledesma
- League: División de Honor
- 2025: División de Honor, 8th of 12
Home colours	Away colours	Third colours

Club Sportivo 2 de Mayo is a Paraguayan football club in the city of Pedro Juan Caballero in Amambay who plays in the Primera División, after being promoted from División Intermedia in 2023. The club reached promotion to the Paraguayan Primera División for the first time in 2005.

== History ==
In January 2006, 2 de Mayo converted into the 43rd Primera División club in the history of the Asociación Paraguaya de Fútbol.

== Current squad ==
As of 11 April, 2026.

Note: Flags indicate national team as defined under FIFA eligibility rules; some limited exceptions apply. Players may hold more than one non-FIFA nationality.

No.	Pos.	Nation	Player
1	GK	PAR	Ángel Martínez
2	DF	PAR	Miguel Barreto
3	DF	PAR	Wilson Ibarrola
4	DF	PAR	René Rodríguez
5	DF	COL	Juan Camilo Saiz
6	MF	PAR	Esteban Maidana
7	MF	PAR	Elías Alfonso
8	MF	PAR	Orlando Colmán
9	FW	PAR	Rodrigo Ruiz Díaz
10	FW	PAR	Alan Gómez (on loan from Club Nacional)
11	MF	PAR	Ulises Coronel
12	GK	PAR	Carlos Servin
13	FW	PAR	Brahian Ayala
15	DF	PAR	Víctor Dávalos
16	DF	PAR	Alberto Espínola

No.	Pos.	Nation	Player
17	FW	PAR	Pedro Delvalle
18	MF	PAR	Marcelo Acosta (on loan from Rosario Central)
19	DF	PAR	César Castro
21	DF	PAR	Pedro Sosa
22	FW	PAR	Walter Gaona
23	FW	PAR	Fernando Cáceres
24	MF	PAR	Óscar Romero
26	FW	PAR	Sergio Fretes
27	FW	PAR	Diego Acosta
28	GK	PAR	Miguel Urquiza
30	MF	PAR	Alexis Fariña (on loan from Cerro Porteño)
31	MF	PAR	Henry Riquelme
32	MF	PAR	Hosue Díaz (on loan from Club Libertad)
—	MF	PAR	Alvaro Montiel (on loan from Club Olimpia)
—	MF	ARG	Félix Triñanes (on loan from Deportes Temuco)

== Honours ==
- Paraguayan Second Division: 1

2005

- Paraguayan Third Division: 3

2003, 2011, 2017

- Regional Titles (Amambay): 10

1958, 1960, 1980, 1986, 1988, 1995, 1997, 1998, 2002, 2003

== Notable players ==
To appear in this section a player must have either:

- Played at least 125 games for the club.
- Set a club record or won an individual award while at the club.
- Been part of a national team at any time.
- Played in the first division of any other football association (outside of Paraguay).
- Played in a continental and/or intercontinental competition.

1980's

- (Paraguay) (Japan) Mitsuhide Tsuchida

1990's

- –

2000's

- (Paraguay) Salustiano Candia (2005–2006)
- (Paraguay) Rubén Darío Aguilera (2006)
- (Argentina) Carlos Zorrilla (2007–2008, 2010)
- (Brazil) Josías Paulo Cardoso Júnior (2008, 2009)
- (Paraguay) Gustavo Noguera (2008)
- (Paraguay) Marcos Barrera (2008–2009)
- (Paraguay) Ever Caballero (2009)
- (Paraguay) Bibencio Servín (2009–2010)
- (Paraguay) Adalberto Goiri (2009–2012)

2010's

- (Uruguay) Nicolás Núñez (2011)

Non-CONMEBOL players

- (Mexico) Félix Araujo (2008)
- (Mexico) José María Ramírez (2008)
- (Mexico) Víctor Gutiérrez (2008)
