= 2002 Copa Libertadores finals =

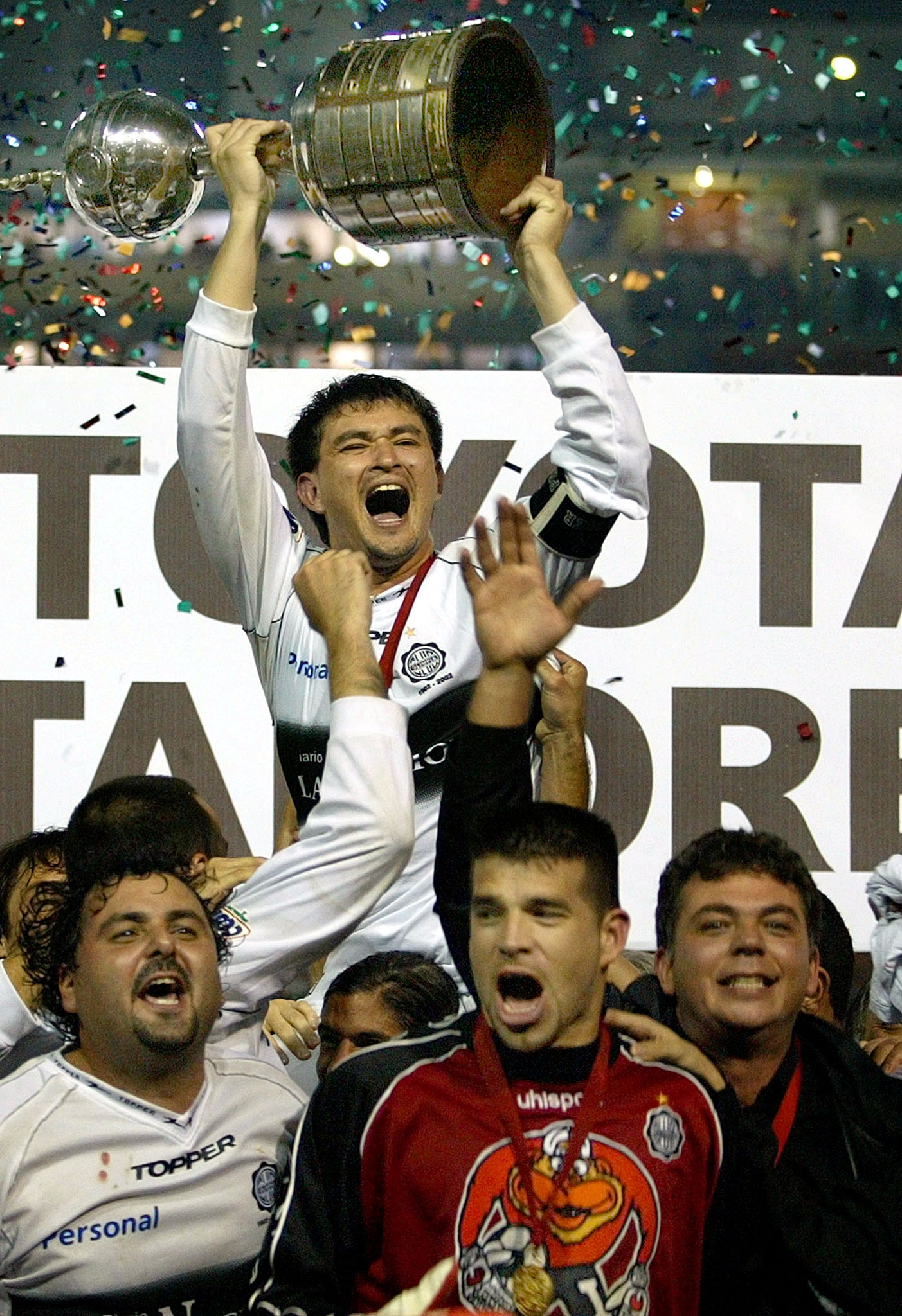
- Olimpia, champions.
- Event: 2002 Copa Toyota Libertadores
| Olimpia | São Caetano |
| (Paraguay) | (Brazil) |
| 2 | 2 |
- on aggregate Olimpia won 4–2 on penalties

First leg
| Olimpia | São Caetano |
| 0 | 1 |
- Date: 24 July 2002
- Venue: Defensores del Chaco, Asunción
- Referee: Horacio Elizondo

Second leg
| São Caetano | Olimpia |
| 1 | 2 |
- Date: 31 July 2002
- Venue: Pacaembú, São Paulo
- Referee: Óscar Ruiz
- Attendance: 32,000

The 2002 Copa Libertadores final was a two-legged football match-up between Paraguayan side Olimpia and São Caetano of Brazil, to determine the 2002 Copa Libertadores champion.

The finals were contested in a two-legged home-and-away format between Paraguayan team Olimpia and Brazilian team São Caetano. The first leg was hosted by Olimpia at Estadio Defensores del Chaco in Asunción on 24 July 2002, while the second leg was hosted by São Caetano at Estadio Pacaembu in São Paulo on 31 July. The winner earned the right to represent CONMEBOL at the 2002 Intercontinental Cup.

São Caetano won the first leg 1–0, while Olimpia won the second leg 2–1, leaving the tie level at 2–2 on aggregate. The title was decided by a penalty shoot-out, which Olimpia won 4–2 to claim their third Copa Libertadores title.

== Qualified teams ==
| Team | Previous finals appearances (bold indicates winners) |
|---|---|
| (Paraguay) Olimpia | 1960, **1979**, 1989, **1990**, 1991 |
| (Brazil) São Caetano | None |

== Venues ==
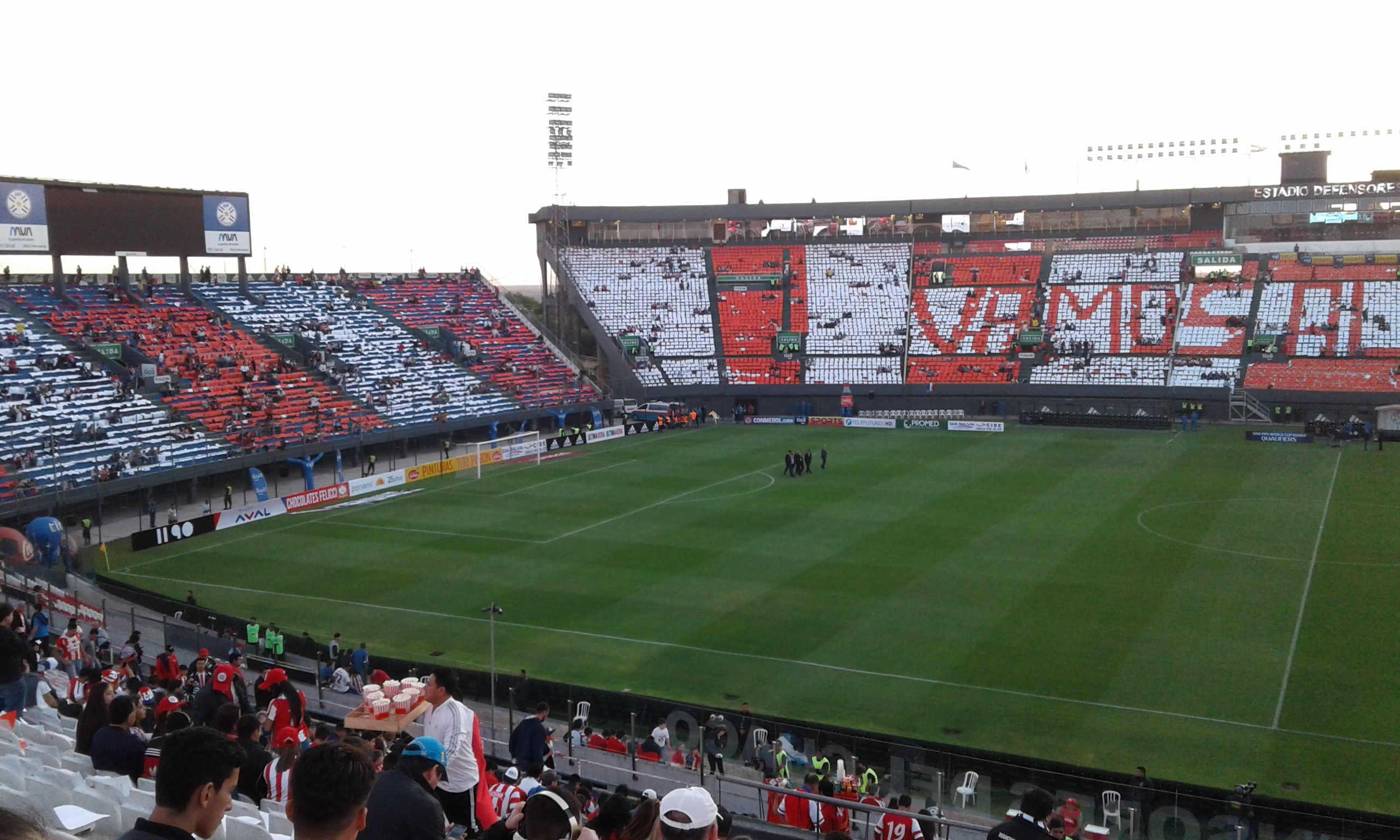
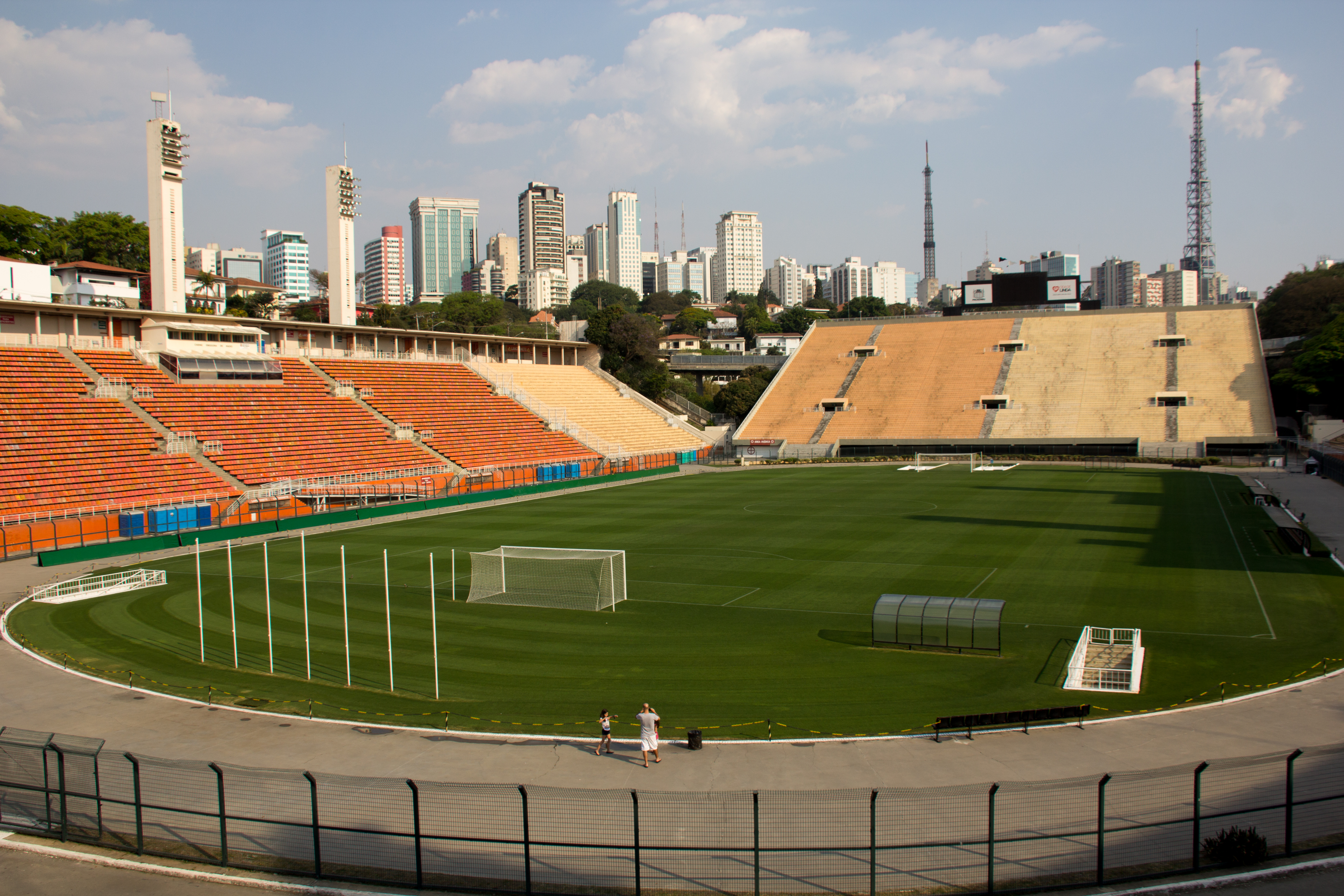
Defensores del Chaco (Asunción) and Pacaembú (São Paulo), venues for the finals

== Route to the finals ==
| São Caetano | | | Olimpia | |
|---|---|---|---|---|
| (Chile) Universidad Católica; A **1–1** | Anaílson 9' | **Round of 16**; First leg | (Chile) Cobreloa; A **2–0** | Dinamarca 10' (o.g.); Zelaya 12' |
| (Chile) Universidad Católica; H **1–1** (p. 4–2) | Brandão 44' | Second leg | (Chile) Cobreloa; H **2–1** | Benítez 24'; Báez 45' |
| (Uruguay) Peñarol; A **0–1** | | **Quarterfinals**; First leg | (Argentina) Boca Juniors; A **1–1** | Traverso 67' (o.g.) |
| (Uruguay) Peñarol; H **2–1** (p. 3–1) | Jean Carlos 27'; Somália 55' | Second leg | (Argentina) Boca Juniors; H **1–0** | Isasi 67' |
| (Mexico) América; H **2–0** | Somália 25'; Adãozinho 41' (pen.) | **Semifinals**; First leg | (Brazil) Grêmio; H **3–2** | Órteman 27', 56'; Benítez 62' |
| (Mexico) América; A **1–1** | Ailton 8' | Second leg | (Brazil) Grêmio; A **0–1** (p. 5–4) | |

== Final summary ==
=== First leg ===
2002 Copa Libertadores finals
24 July 2002
21:45 (UTC-3)
First leg

| Olimpia (Paraguay) | 0–1 | (Brazil) São Caetano |
|---|---|---|
| | Report | Ailton 61' |

Estadio de los Defensores del Chaco, Asunción
Referee: Horacio Elizondo (Argentina)

| **Olimpia** | **São Caetano** |

| GK | 1 | (Paraguay) Ricardo Tavarelli |
| DF | 2 | (Paraguay) Néstor Isasi | | (substituted off) 66' |
| DF | 3 | (Paraguay) Nelson Zelaya |
| DF | 4 | (Brazil) Henrique da Silva |
| DF | 5 | (Paraguay) Julio Cáceres |
| MF | 6 | (Paraguay) Julio Enciso |
| MF | 11 | (Argentina) Gastón Córdoba | | (substituted off) 68' |
| MF | 15 | (Paraguay) Juan Carlos Franco |
| MF | 16 | (Uruguay) Sergio Órteman (c) | (yellow card) 41' |
| FW | 9 | (Paraguay) Richard Báez | | (substituted off) 60' |
| FW | 10 | (Paraguay) Miguel Benítez |
Substitutes:
| GK | 12 | (Paraguay) Danilo Aceval |
| FW | 7 | (Paraguay) Mauro Caballero | | (substituted on) 60' |
| DF | 13 | (Paraguay) Virginio Cáceres | | (substituted on) 66' |
| MF | 17 | (Paraguay) Francisco Esteche |
| MF | 18 | (Paraguay) Carlos Estigarribia |
| FW | 21 | (Uruguay) Hernán López | | (substituted on) 68' |
| DF | 23 | (Paraguay) Pedro Benítez |
Manager:
(Argentina) Nery Pumpido

| GK | 1 | (Brazil) Silvio Luiz |
| DF | 2 | (Brazil) Russo (c) |
| DF | 3 | (Brazil) Daniel |
| DF | 4 | (Brazil) Dininho | (yellow card) 92' |
| DF | 6 | (Brazil) Rubens Cardoso |
| MF | 5 | (Brazil) Marcos Senna | (yellow card) 70' |
| MF | 8 | (Brazil) Ailton | | (substituted off) 65' |
| MF | 10 | (Brazil) Anaílson | | (substituted off) 80' |
| MF | 11 | (Brazil) Adãozinho |
| FW | 18 | (Brazil) Robert | | (substituted off) 62' |
| FW | 9 | (Brazil) Somália |
Substitutes:
| GK | 12 | (Brazil) Luciano |
| DF | 7 | (Brazil) Serginho | | (substituted on) 62' |
| MF | 13 | (Brazil) Marlon | | (substituted on) 65' |
| DF | 14 | (Brazil) Bruno Quadros |
| FW | 15 | (Brazil) Jean Carlos |
| MF | 20 | (Brazil) Wágner | | (substituted on) 80' |
| FW | 24 | (Brazil) Chininha |
Manager:
(Brazil) Jair Picerni

Assistant referees:
(Argentina) Jorge Rattalino
(Argentina) Darío García
Fourth official:
(Argentina) Héctor Baldassi

=== Second leg ===
31 July 2002
21.45 (UTC-3)
Second leg

| São Caetano (Brazil) | 1–2 | (Paraguay) Olimpia |
|---|---|---|
| Ailton 31' | Report | Córdoba 49'; Báez 59' |
Penalties
| Adãozinho (penalty scored); Marcos Senna (penalty scored); Marlon (penalty missed); Serginho (penalty missed) | 2–4 | (penalty scored) Enciso; (penalty scored) Órteman; (penalty scored) H. López; (penalty scored) Caballero |

Estádio do Pacaembu, São Paulo
Attendance: 32,000
Referee: Óscar Ruiz (Colombia)

| **São Caetano** | **Olimpia** |

| GK | 1 | (Brazil) Silvio Luiz |
| DF | 2 | (Brazil) Russo (c) | (yellow card) 40' |
| DF | 3 | (Brazil) Daniel |
| DF | 4 | (Brazil) Dininho |
| DF | 6 | (Brazil) Rubens Cardoso |
| MF | 5 | (Brazil) Marcos Senna | (yellow card) 62' |
| MF | 8 | (Brazil) Ailton | | (substituted off) 79' |
| MF | 10 | (Brazil) Anaílson | (yellow card) 93' | (substituted off) 93' |
| MF | 11 | (Brazil) Adãozinho |
| FW | 18 | (Brazil) Robert | (yellow card) 60' | (substituted off) 60' |
| FW | 9 | (Brazil) Somália |
Substitutes:
| GK | 12 | (Brazil) Luciano |
| DF | 7 | (Brazil) Serginho | | (substituted on) 60' |
| MF | 13 | (Brazil) Marlon | | (substituted on) 93' |
| DF | 14 | (Brazil) Bruno Quadros |
| FW | 15 | (Brazil) Jean Carlos |
| MF | 20 | (Brazil) Wágner | | (substituted on) 79' |
| FW | 24 | (Brazil) Chininha |
Manager:
(Brazil) Jair Picerni

| GK | 1 | (Paraguay) Ricardo Tavarelli |
| DF | 2 | (Paraguay) Néstor Isasi |
| DF | 3 | (Paraguay) Nelson Zelaya |
| DF | 4 | (Brazil) Henrique da Silva |
| DF | 5 | (Paraguay) Julio Cáceres | (yellow card) 3' |
| MF | 8 | (Paraguay) Victor Quintana | (yellow card) 86' (yellow-red card) |
| MF | 6 | (Paraguay) Julio Enciso | (yellow card) 92' |
| MF | 11 | (Argentina) Gastón Córdoba | | (substituted off) 73' |
| MF | 16 | (Uruguay) Sergio Órteman (c) | (yellow card) 61' |
| FW | 9 | (Paraguay) Richard Báez | | (substituted off) 81' |
| FW | 10 | (Paraguay) Miguel Benítez | (yellow card) 61' | (substituted off) 61' |
Substitutes:
| GK | 12 | (Paraguay) Danilo Aceval |
| FW | 7 | (Paraguay) Mauro Caballero | | (substituted on) 73' |
| MF | 15 | (Paraguay) Juan Carlos Franco | | (substituted on) 81' |
| MF | 17 | (Paraguay) Francisco Esteche |
| MF | 18 | (Paraguay) Carlos Estigarribia |
| FW | 21 | (Uruguay) Hernán López | | (substituted on) 61' |
| DF | 23 | (Paraguay) Pedro Benítez |
Manager:
(Argentina) Nery Pumpido

Assistant referees:
(Colombia) Oswaldo Díaz
(Colombia) Eduardo Botero
Fourth official:
(Colombia) Felipe Russi
