= 2002 Intercontinental Cup =

Real Madrid	Olimpia
(Spain)	(Paraguay)
2	0
- Date: 3 December 2002
- Venue: International Stadium Yokohama, Yokohama
- Man of the Match: Ronaldo (Real Madrid)
- Referee: Carlos Eugênio Simon (Brazil)
- Attendance: 66,070

The 2002 Intercontinental Cup was an association football match played on 3 December 2002, between Real Madrid of Spain, winners of the 2001–02 UEFA Champions League, and Olimpia of Paraguay, winners of the 2002 Copa Libertadores. The match was played for the first time in the tournament's history at the International Stadium Yokohama in Yokohama. This encounter marked a special occasion for Olimpia and Real Madrid, as both teams celebrated their centenary in 2002.

Ronaldo opened the scoring for Real Madrid in the 14th minute shooting low right footed past the goalkeeper from inside the penalty box. The second goal was scored by Guti in the 84th minute, heading home at the near post after a cross from Luís Figo on the right.

== Venue ==
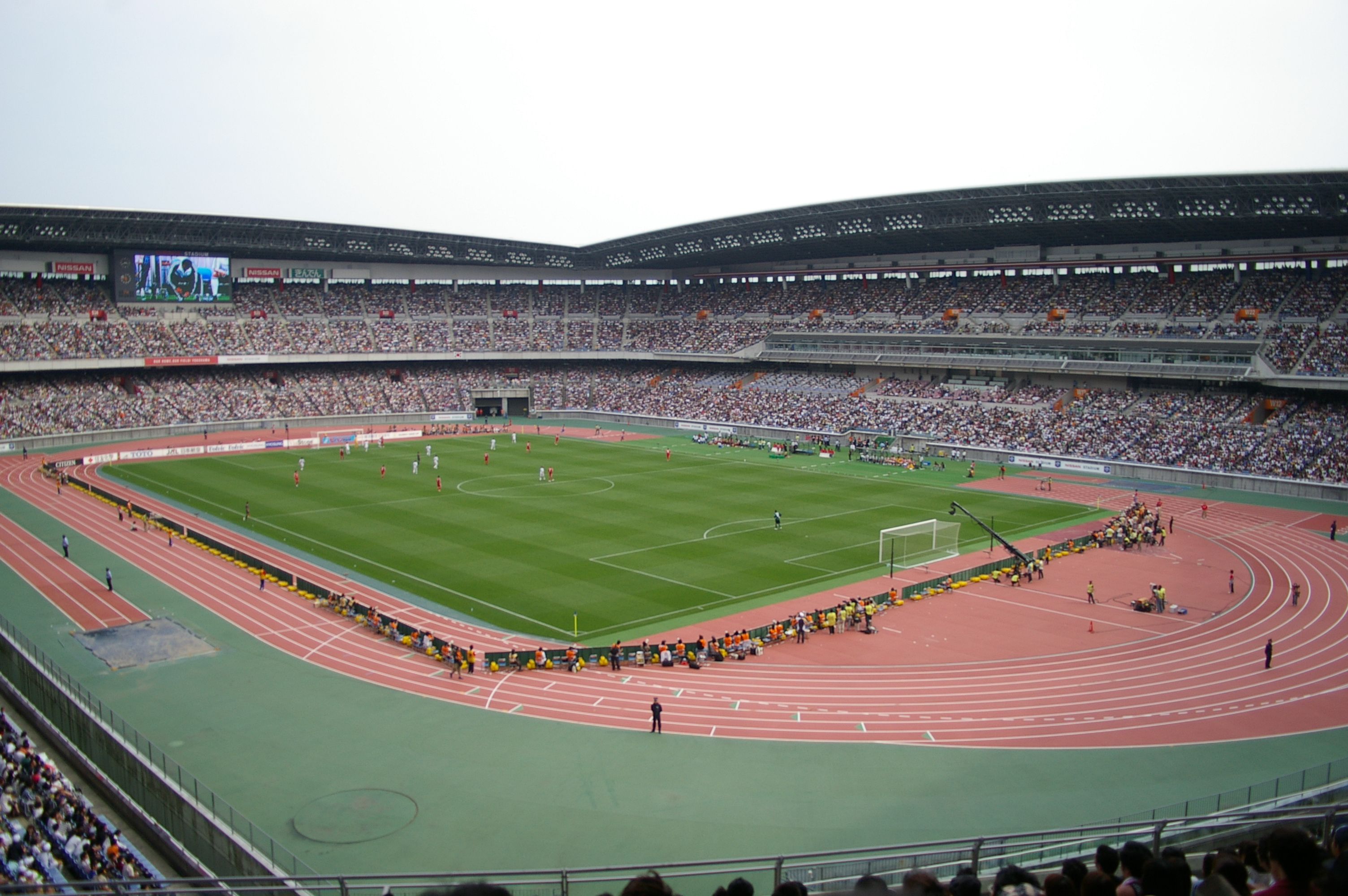
International Stadium, Yokohama, hosted the final

== Match details ==
3 December 2002
19:15 JST

Real Madrid (Spain)	2–0	(Paraguay) Olimpia
Ronaldo 14'; Guti 84'	Report

International Stadium Yokohama, Yokohama
Attendance: 66,070
Referee: Carlos Eugênio Simon (Brazil)

Real Madrid	Olimpia

GK	1	(Spain) Iker Casillas
RB	2	(Spain) Míchel Salgado
CB	4	(Spain) Fernando Hierro (c)
CB	6	(Spain) Iván Helguera
LB	3	(Brazil) Roberto Carlos	(yellow card) 89'
DM	24	(France) Claude Makélélé
DM	19	(Argentina) Esteban Cambiasso		(substituted off) 90'
RW	10	(Portugal) Luís Figo
AM	5	(France) Zinedine Zidane		(substituted off) 86'
LW	7	(Spain) Raúl
CF	11	(Brazil) Ronaldo		(substituted off) 82'
Substitutes:
GK	13	(Spain) César Sánchez
DF	17	(Spain) Óscar Miñambres
DF	22	(Spain) Francisco Pavón		(substituted on) 90'
MF	14	(Spain) Guti		(substituted on) 82'
MF	16	(Brazil) Flávio Conceição
MF	21	(Argentina) Santiago Solari		(substituted on) 86'
CF	9	(Spain) Fernando Morientes
Manager:
(Spain) Vicente del Bosque

GK	1	(Paraguay) Ricardo Tavarelli
RB	2	(Paraguay) Néstor Isasi
CB	3	(Paraguay) Nelson Zelaya
CB	15	(Paraguay) Pedro Benítez
LB	4	(Paraguay) Juan Ramón Jara
RM	16	(Uruguay) Sergio Órteman
CM	6	(Paraguay) Julio César Enciso (c)
CM	5	(Paraguay) Julio César Cáceres	(yellow card) 34'
LM	11	(Argentina) Fernando Gastón Córdoba		(substituted off) 65'
CF	10	(Paraguay) Miguel Ángel Benítez		(substituted off) 81'
CF	8	(Uruguay) Rodrigo López
Substitutes:
GK	12	(Paraguay) Danilo Aceval
DF	14	(Paraguay) José Amarilla
MF	7	(Paraguay) Francisco Esteche
MF	18	(Paraguay) Carlos Estigarribia
FW	9	(Paraguay) Richart Báez		(substituted on) 65'
FW	17	(Paraguay) Mauro Caballero		(substituted on) 81'
FW	19	(Paraguay) Gilberto Palacios
Manager:
(Argentina) Nery Pumpido

Man of the Match:
(Brazil) Ronaldo (Real Madrid)

Assistant referees:
Jorge Arango (Colombia)
Jorge Jaimes (Peru)
Fourth official:
Toru Kamikawa (Japan)

== See also ==
- 2001–02 UEFA Champions League
- 2002 Copa Libertadores
- 2002–03 Real Madrid CF season
- Real Madrid CF in international football
