= Julio César Cáceres =

Paraguayan footballer (born 1979)

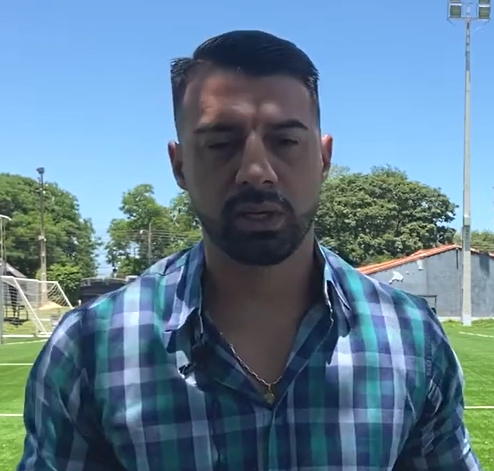
- Cáceres in 2022

Personal information
- Full name: Julio César Cáceres López
- Date of birth: 5 October 1979 (age 47)
- Place of birth: San José de los Arroyos, Paraguay
- Height: 1.81 m (5 ft 11 in)
- Position: Centre-back

Youth career
- Sportivo San José

Senior career*
Years	Team	Apps	(Gls)
1998–2004	Olimpia	91	(7)
2004	Nacional Asunción		
2004–2007	Nantes	12	(0)
2005	→ Atlético Mineiro (loan)	20	(3)
2006	→ River Plate (loan)	15	(0)
2006	→ Gimnàstic (loan)	11	(0)
2007	UANL Tigres	34	(2)
2008–2009	Boca Juniors	54	(1)
2010	Atlético Mineiro	14	(0)
2011–2012	Olimpia	48	(2)
2013–2018	Guaraní	157	(8)
2019–2020	Olimpia	1	(0)

International career
2000	Paraguay U23		
1999–2010	Paraguay	65	(2)

Managerial career
- 2021: Olimpia (reserves)
- 2021–2023: Olimpia
- 2023–2024: Sportivo Luqueño
- 2025: Sportivo Luqueño
- 2026: Sportivo San Lorenzo
- * Club domestic league appearances and goals

Julio César Cáceres López (pronounced [ˈxuljo ˈsesaɾ ˈkaseɾes ˈlopes]; born 5 October 1979) is a Paraguayan football manager and former player who played as a centre-back.

Cáceres played in the Paraguay national team for nearly 11 years, being part of the 2002, 2006 and 2010 FIFA World Cup squads.

== Club career ==
=== Olimpia ===
Cáceres' first club was Primera División de Paraguay club, Olimpia, where he helped the club become Paraguayan champions twice.

==== 1998 ====
On 12 April 1998, Caceres debuted for Olimpia aged 18 in a 1–0 loss against Guaraní.

==== 1999 ====
In 1999, after winning the Apertura tournament, and finishing third in the Clausura tournament they were crowned champions with a 4–2 aggregate win over Cerro Porteño in the National championship game. In the 1999 season, teammates in the Olimpia squad were Denis Caniza, Ruben Maldonado, Carlos Humberto Paredes, Gustavo Neffa, Roque Santa Cruz and Richart Baez.

==== 2000 ====
In 2000 they again won the Apertura tournament, and also the Clausura tournament, thus were crowned champions.

==== 2002 ====
He was also part of the team that won the Copa Libertadores in 2002. Cáceres played in both legs of the 2002 Copa Libertadores Final as Olimpia defeated Brazilian club São Caetano in July. As Copa Libertadores winners, Olimpia faced Real Madrid in Yokohama in the 2002 Intercontinental Cup which they lost 2-0 as Caceres played an entire 90 minutes of the match.

==== 2003 ====
Caceres was part of the Olimpia team which then won the Recopa Sudamericana in 2003.

==== 2004 ====
On 24 May 2004, Caceres played his last game for Olimpia.

Caceres had played in 91 league games, converting 6 goals. He also played 32 games internationally for the club, which included matches in the Copa Libertadores, Copa Mercosur, the Intercontinental Cup and the Recopa Sudamericana.Caceres earned two Primera División Paraguaya league titles, one Copa Libertadores title and one Recopa Sudamericana title.

=== Nacional Asunción ===
In June 2004, Caceres briefly signed for Nacional Asunción prior to transferring to Nantes in France.

=== Nantes ===
In 2004, he signed for French Ligue 1 club Nantes. Caceres initially joined Nantes on a one-year provisional transfer issued by FIFA, due to a dispute between Olimpia Asunción and Cáceres at the time of still being in the team roster at Nacional Asunción.

He made his league debut on 14 August 2004 in a 1–1 draw with Bastia. However, he later suffered an injury and did not play for several months. By the time he had recovered, Nantes had a new coach who did not play Cáceres.

==== Loan to Mineiro ====
e was loaned to Brazilian Brasileirão club Atlético Mineiro for the 2005 season. His league debut came on 11 September 2005, a 2–0 defeat to Botafogo. He made fourteen league appearances, scoring two goals. However, the club finished in 20th place and were relegated to Brasileiro Série B.

==== Loan to River Plate ====
In January 2006, he moved to Argentina, signing for River Plate on loan, where he quickly became a key player and squad captain. He made his league debut in a 5–0 win at Tiro Federal on 29 January. He was also a part of the River Plate team that reached the quarter-finals of the 2006 Copa Libertadores. In July 2006, River Plate decided not to buy the transfer of Caceres and that he would be sold by his owner club, Nantes, to a Mexican club.

==== Loan to Gimnàstic ====
Later in 2006 he spent two months in Spain, from October to December, with Catalan club Gimnàstic de Tarragona in La Liga where he made eleven league appearances.

=== UANL Tigres ===
In January 2007 Cáceres moved to Mexico when he was signed by Tigres, with whom he maintained a regular starting position. He made his league debut in a 2–1 defeat at Tecos on 20 January 2007 and scored his first goal for the club on 3 March in a 3–2 win over Chiapas. He made a total of 32 league appearances, scoring two goals.

=== Boca Juniors ===
In January 2008 he moved again to Argentina, signing for Boca Juniors. He made his league debut on 10 February 2008 in a 1–1 draw with Rosario Central. On 14 May he scored Boca's first goal as they were held to a 2–2 home draw by Mexican club Atlas in the quarter-finals of the 2008 Copa Libertadores

In October 2008 Cáceres had a very public conflict with Boca teammate Juan Román Riquelme, when in an interview on a Paraguayan radio station in Asunción, where he was training with his national team, Cáceres questioned Riquelme's motivation. He claimed that "In some matches, he is apparently running and in others he is passive. He seems to be mentally saturated. He seems to have more motivation when he plays for his country." However, Riquelme responded in a telephone interview on the Fox Sports cable channel, saying "He doesn't know what I feel for the club. I take part in pre-match concentration just like the other players and I didn't have a holiday because I chose to play in the (Olympic) Games. When we won the gold, I ran to the airport so I could play in the (Recopa Sudamericana 2008) final." And adding, "These things should be kept in the dressing-room, he's broken all the codes of football." However, after Boca won the Superclásico derby match over Buenos Aires rivals River Plate 1–0 at El Monumental on 21 October 2008, Cáceres said that the conflict "has been left behind", adding that the relationship between the two players had improved. Caceres scored his first goal for Boca Juniors in a 2–1 win against Lanus 30 August 2009.

=== Atletico Mineiro ===
In January 2010 Cáceres left Boca Juniors to join Atlético Mineiro of Brazil.

=== Return to Olimpia ===
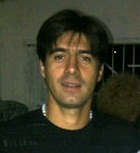
Cáceres in 2011

On 14 January 2011, Cáceres returned to his first professional club Olimpia from Atletico Mineiro when he signed a two-year contract.

=== Second return to Olimpia ===
In July 2018, Caceres re-joined Olimpia at age 38 after five and a-half seasons with Guaraní, informing that he wanted to be champion with Olimpia and then retire.

During the 2020 COVID-19 pandemic, Caceres performed his training routine from home. In October 2020, at 41 years of age, Caceres commented that he wanted to retire during the Torneo Apertura but was unable to, and that he would retire at the end of the year.

== International career ==
In 2000, Caceres represented Paraguay U23 at the 2000 CONMEBOL Men Pre-Olympic Tournament.

Cáceres made his international debut in April 2002 against England. He currently has 30 caps and has scored four goals for Paraguay. He played in both the 2002 FIFA World Cup finals and the 2006 FIFA World Cup. On 8 June 2005 he scored Paraguay's third goal as they beat Bolivia 4–1 at the Estadio Defensores del Chaco, Asunción in a South American qualification match for the 2006 World Cup. In 2007, he played in the Copa América

He played in all seven matches for Paraguay of the first rounds in the South American qualification for the 2010 FIFA World Cup.

== Coaching career ==
In June 2021, Última Hora announced that Cáceres would become reserve-team coach at his last club Olimpia. On 15 October, he was named manager of the club after Álvaro Gutiérrez resigned.

On 6 March 2023, Cáceres was sacked by Olimpia. On 31 May, he was named manager of fellow top tier side Sportivo Luqueño, replacing Gustavo Florentín.

On 2 September 2024, Cáceres left Sportivo Luqueño by mutual consent. The following 18 May, however, he returned to the club in the place of Gustavo Morínigo, but was dismissed on 4 October 2025.

== Honours ==
Olimpia

- Paraguayan Primera División: 1999, 2000
- Copa Libertadores: 2002
- Recopa Sudamericana: 2003

Boca Juniors

- Recopa Sudamericana: 2008
- Argentine Primera División: 2008 Apertura

Atlético Mineiro

- Campeonato Mineiro: 2010
