= Copa Libertadores clubs performance comparison =

The table below shows the comparison of the performances of all clubs that participated in Copa Libertadores since the current format of the group stage.

== Classification ==
C	Champions
F	Runners-up
SF	Semi-finals
QF	Quarter-finals
R16	Round of 16
GS	Group stage
TS	Third stage
SS	Second stage
FS	First stage
•	Did not participate

Notes: Since 2017, the tournament increased from 38 to 47 teams, and the qualifying stages were expanded from one to three rounds.

== Performance ==
Club (# of participations)		2000	2001	2002	2003	2004	2005	2006	2007	2008	2009	2010	2011	2012	2013	2014	2015	2016	2017	2018	2019	2020	2021	2022	2023	2024	2025	2026
(Brazil) BRAZIL (169)		(5)	(4)	(4)	(4)	(5)	(5)	(6)	(6)	(5)	(5)	(5)	(6)	(6)	(6)	(6)	(5)	(5)	(8)	(8)	(8)	(8)	(8)	(9)	(8)	(8)	(8)	(8)
1	Palmeiras (17)	F	SF	•	•	•	R16	R16	•	•	QF	•	•	•	R16	•	•	GS	R16	SF	QF	C	C	SF	SF	R16	F	
2	Flamengo (16)	•	•	GS	•	•	•	•	R16	R16	•	QF	•	GS	•	GS	•	•	GS	R16	C	R16	F	C	R16	QF	C	SF
3	Corinthians (15)	SF	•	•	R16	•	•	R16	•	•	•	R16	FS	C	R16	•	R16	R16	•	R16	•	SS	•	QF	GS	•	TS	QF
4	São Paulo (15)	•	•	•	•	SF	C	F	R16	QF	QF	SF	•	•	R16	•	R16	SF	•	•	SS	GS	QF	•	•	QF	QF	•
5	Grêmio (14)	•	•	SF	QF	•	•	•	F	•	SF	•	R16	•	R16	R16	•	R16	C	SF	SF	QF	TS	•	•	R16	•	•
6	Atlético Mineiro (11)	QF	•	•	•	•	•	•	•	•	•	•	•	•	C	R16	R16	QF	R16	•	GS	•	SF	QF	R16	F	•	•
7	Cruzeiro (11)	•	QF	•	•	R16	•	•	•	R16	F	QF	R16	•	•	QF	QF	•	•	QF	R16	•	•	•	•	•	•	R16
8	Santos (11)	•	•	•	F	QF	QF	•	SF	QF	•	•	C	SF	•	•	•	•	QF	R16	•	F	GS	•	•	•	•	•
9	Internacional (11)	•	•	•	•	•	•	C	GS	•	•	C	R16	R16	•	•	SF	•	•	•	QF	R16	R16	•	SF	•	R16	•
10	Athletico Paranaense (9)	R16	•	GS	•	•	F	•	•	•	•	•	•	•	•	GS	•	•	R16	•	R16	R16	•	F	R16	•	•	•
11	Fluminense (9)	•	•	•	•	•	•	•	•	F	•	•	R16	QF	QF	•	•	•	•	•	•	•	QF	TS	C	QF	•	SF
12	Botafogo (5)	•	•	•	•	•	•	•	•	•	•	•	•	•	•	GS	•	•	QF	•	•	•	•	•	•	C	R16	TS
13	São Caetano (3)	•	R16	F	•	QF	•	•	•	•	•	•	•	•	•	•	•	•	•	•	•	•	•	•	•	•	•	•
14	Vasco da Gama (3)	•	QF	•	•	•	•	•	•	•	•	•	•	QF	•	•	•	•	•	GS	•	•	•	•	•	•	•	•
15	Fortaleza (3)	•	•	•	•	•	•	•	•	•	•	•	•	•	•	•	•	•	•	•	•	•	•	R16	TS	•	R16	•
16	Chapecoense (2)	•	•	•	•	•	•	•	•	•	•	•	•	•	•	•	•	•	GS	SS	•	•	•	•	•	•	•	•
17	Red Bull Bragantino (2)	•	•	•	•	•	•	•	•	•	•	•	•	•	•	•	•	•	•	•	•	•	•	GS	•	TS	•	•
18	Bahia (2)	•	•	•	•	•	•	•	•	•	•	•	•	•	•	•	•	•	•	•	•	•	•	•	•	•	GS	SS
19	Juventude (1)	GS	•	•	•	•	•	•	•	•	•	•	•	•	•	•	•	•	•	•	•	•	•	•	•	•	•	•
20	Paysandu (1)	•	•	•	R16	•	•	•	•	•	•	•	•	•	•	•	•	•	•	•	•	•	•	•	•	•	•	•
21	Coritiba (1)	•	•	•	•	GS	•	•	•	•	•	•	•	•	•	•	•	•	•	•	•	•	•	•	•	•	•	•
22	Santo André (1)	•	•	•	•	•	GS	•	•	•	•	•	•	•	•	•	•	•	•	•	•	•	•	•	•	•	•	•
23	Goias (1)	•	•	•	•	•	•	QF	•	•	•	•	•	•	•	•	•	•	•	•	•	•	•	•	•	•	•	•
24	Paulista (1)	•	•	•	•	•	•	GS	•	•	•	•	•	•	•	•	•	•	•	•	•	•	•	•	•	•	•	•
25	Paraná (1)	•	•	•	•	•	•	•	R16	•	•	•	•	•	•	•	•	•	•	•	•	•	•	•	•	•	•	•
26	Sport Recife (1)	•	•	•	•	•	•	•	•	•	R16	•	•	•	•	•	•	•	•	•	•	•	•	•	•	•	•	•
27	América Mineiro (1)	•	•	•	•	•	•	•	•	•	•	•	•	•	•	•	•	•	•	•	•	•	•	GS	•	•	•	•
28	Mirassol (1)	•	•	•	•	•	•	•	•	•	•	•	•	•	•	•	•	•	•	•	•	•	•	•	•	•	•	R16
(Argentina) ARGENTINA (152)		(4)	(5)	(5)	(4)	(5)	(5)	(5)	(5)	(6)	(5)	(6)	(5)	(5)	(5)	(5)	(6)	(6)	(6)	(7)	(7)	(6)	(7)	(6)	(6)	(6)	(7)	(7)
1	River Plate (21)	QF	QF	R16	QF	SF	SF	QF	GS	R16	GS	•	•	•	•	•	C	R16	SF	C	F	SF	QF	R16	R16	SF	QF	•
2	Boca Juniors (21)	C	C	QF	C	F	QF	•	C	SF	R16	•	•	F	QF	•	R16	SF	•	F	SF	SF	R16	R16	F	•	SS	GS
3	San Lorenzo (13)	GS	GS	GS	•	•	GS	•	•	QF	GS	•	•	•	•	C	GS	GS	QF	•	R16	•	TS	•	•	R16	•	•
4	Vélez Sarsfield (13)	•	GS	GS	•	GS	•	QF	R16	•	•	R16	SF	QF	R16	R16	•	•	•	•	•	•	R16	SF	•	•	QF	•
5	Estudiantes (12)	•	•	•	•	•	•	R16	•	R16	C	QF	R16	•	•	•	R16	•	GS	R16	•	•	•	QF	•	GS	QF	
6	Rosario Central (8)	R16	SF	•	•	R16	•	GS	•	•	•	•	•	•	•	•	•	QF	•	•	GS	•	•	•	•	GS	•	R16
7	Racing (8)	•	•	•	R16	•	•	•	•	•	•	•	•	•	•	•	QF	R16	•	R16	•	QF	R16	•	QF	•	SF	•
8	Lanús (7)	•	•	•	•	•	•	•	•	R16	GS	GS	•	R16	•	QF	•	•	F	•	•	•	•	•	•	•	•	GS
9	Talleres (5)	•	•	GS	•	•	•	•	•	•	•	•	•	•	•	•	•	•	•	•	TS	•	•	QF	•	R16	GS	•
10	Godoy Cruz (5)	•	•	•	•	•	•	•	•	•	•	•	GS	GS	•	•	•	•	R16	•	R16	•	•	•	•	SS	•	•
11	Banfield (4)	•	•	•	•	•	QF	•	GS	•	•	R16	•	•	•	•	•	•	•	TS	•	•	•	•	•	•	•	•
12	Newell's Old Boys (4)	•	•	•	•	•	•	R16	•	•	•	FS	•	•	SF	GS	•	•	•	•	•	•	•	•	•	•	•	•
13	Arsenal (4)	•	•	•	•	•	•	•	•	GS	•	•	•	GS	GS	QF	•	•	•	•	•	•	•	•	•	•	•	•
14	Argentinos Juniors (4)	•	•	•	•	•	•	•	•	•	•	•	GS	•	•	•	•	•	•	•	•	•	R16	•	R16	•	•	SS
15	Huracán (4)	•	•	•	•	•	•	•	•	•	•	•	•	•	•	•	GS	R16	•	•	GS	•	•	•	TS	•	•	•
16	Independiente (3)	•	•	•	•	GS	•	•	•	•	•	•	GS	•	•	•	•	•	•	QF	•	•	•	•	•	•	•	•
17	Atlético Tucumán (3)	•	•	•	•	•	•	•	•	•	•	•	•	•	•	•	•	•	GS	QF	•	TS	•	•	•	•	•	•
18	Gimnasia y Esgrima (2)	•	•	•	GS	•	•	•	GS	•	•	•	•	•	•	•	•	•	•	•	•	•	•	•	•	•	•	•
19	Colón (2)	•	•	•	•	•	•	•	•	•	•	FS	•	•	•	•	•	•	•	•	•	•	•	R16	•	•	•	•
20	Tigre (2)	•	•	•	•	•	•	•	•	•	•	•	•	•	R16	•	•	•	•	•	•	GS	•	•	•	•	•	•
21	Defensa y Justicia (2)	•	•	•	•	•	•	•	•	•	•	•	•	•	•	•	•	•	•	•	•	GS	R16	•	•	•	•	•
22	Quilmes (1)	•	•	•	•	•	GS	•	•	•	•	•	•	•	•	•	•	•	•	•	•	•	•	•	•	•	•	•
23	Patronato (1)	•	•	•	•	•	•	•	•	•	•	•	•	•	•	•	•	•	•	•	•	•	•	•	GS	•	•	•
24	Central Córdoba (1)	•	•	•	•	•	•	•	•	•	•	•	•	•	•	•	•	•	•	•	•	•	•	•	•	•	GS	•
25	Platense (1)	•	•	•	•	•	•	•	•	•	•	•	•	•	•	•	•	•	•	•	•	•	•	•	•	•	•	QF
26	Independiente Rivadavia (1)	•	•	•	•	•	•	•	•	•	•	•	•	•	•	•	•	•	•	•	•	•	•	•	•	•	•	R16
(Ecuador) ECUADOR (95)		(3)	(3)	(3)	(3)	(3)	(3)	(3)	(3)	(3)	(4)	(3)	(3)	(3)	(3)	(3)	(3)	(3)	(4)	(4)	(4)	(5)	(4)	(4)	(5)	(5)	(4)	(4)
1	Emelec (16)	GS	R16	GS	GS	•	•	•	GS	•	•	GS	GS	R16	R16	GS	QF	GS	R16	GS	R16	•	•	R16	•	•	•	•
2	LDU Quito (16)	GS	•	•	•	R16	R16	QF	GS	C	GS	•	R16	•	FS	•	•	GS	•	•	QF	R16	GS	•	•	GS	SF	QF
3	El Nacional (13)	R16	R16	R16	GS	GS	•	GS	GS	•	FS	•	•	FS	•	•	•	•	SS	•	•	•	•	•	SS	SS	SS	•
4	Barcelona (13)	•	•	•	GS	R16	•	•	•	•	•	•	•	•	GS	•	GS	•	SF	•	SS	GS	SF	TS	GS	GS	GS	GS
5	Independiente del Valle (12)	•	•	•	•	•	•	•	•	•	•	•	•	•	•	GS	FS	F	SS	SS	•	R16	GS	GS	R16	GS	GS	QF
6	Deportivo Cuenca (5)	•	•	•	•	•	GS	FS	•	GS	R16	GS	•	•	•	•	•	•	•	•	•	•	•	•	•	•	•	•
7	Deportivo Quito (5)	•	•	•	•	•	•	•	•	•	GS	GS	FS	R16	•	FS	•	•	•	•	•	•	•	•	•	•	•	•
8	Olmedo (4)	•	GS	R16	•	•	GS	•	•	FS	•	•	•	•	•	•	•	•	•	•	•	•	•	•	•	•	•	•
9	Universidad Católica (4)	•	•	•	•	•	•	•	•	•	•	•	•	•	•	•	•	•	•	•	•	•	SS	TS	SS	•	•	FS
10	Delfín (3)	•	•	•	•	•	•	•	•	•	•	•	•	•	•	•	•	•	•	GS	SS	R16	•	•	•	•	•	•
11	Macará (2)	•	•	•	•	•	•	•	•	•	•	•	•	•	•	•	•	•	•	FS	•	SS	•	•	•	•	•	•
12	Aucas (2)	•	•	•	•	•	•	•	•	•	•	•	•	•	•	•	•	•	•	•	•	•	•	•	GS	FS	•	•
Club (# of participations)		2000	2001	2002	2003	2004	2005	2006	2007	2008	2009	2010	2011	2012	2013	2014	2015	2016	2017	2018	2019	2020	2021	2022	2023	2024	2025	2026
(Colombia) COLOMBIA (93)		(3)	(3)	(3)	(3)	(3)	(4)	(3)	(3)	(3)	(3)	(3)	(3)	(3)	(3)	(3)	(3)	(3)	(5)	(4)	(4)	(4)	(4)	(4)	(4)	(4)	(4)	(4)
1	Atlético Nacional (15)	GS	•	•	•	•	•	R16	•	R16	•	•	•	R16	•	QF	R16	C	GS	R16	TS	•	GS	SS	R16	SS	R16	•
2	Junior (13)	R16	R16	•	•	•	R16	•	•	•	•	FS	R16	GS	•	•	•	•	TS	GS	GS	GS	GS	•	•	R16	•	GS
3	Santa Fe (10)	•	•	•	•	•	•	R16	•	•	•	•	•	•	SF	GS	QF	GS	GS	GS	•	•	GS	•	•	•	SS	GS
4	Independiente Medellín (9)	•	•	•	SF	•	R16	•	•	•	GS	GS	•	•	•	•	•	•	GS	•	SS	GS	•	•	GS	•	•	GS
5	Deportes Tolima (9)	•	•	•	•	GS	•	•	GS	•	•	•	GS	•	GS	•	•	•	•	•	GS	TS	•	R16	•	•	SS	R16
6	América de Cali (8)	R16	QF	R16	SF	•	GS	•	•	•	GS	•	•	•	•	•	•	•	•	•	•	GS	GS	•	•	•	•	•
7	Deportivo Cali (7)	•	GS	•	R16	QF	•	GS	•	•	•	•	•	•	•	GS	•	GS	•	•	•	•	•	GS	•	•	•	•
8	Once Caldas (7)	•	•	GS	•	C	R16	•	•	•	•	R16	QF	FS	•	•	FS	•	•	•	•	•	•	•	•	•	•	•
9	Millonarios (6)	•	•	•	•	•	•	•	•	•	•	•	•	•	GS	•	•	•	SS	GS	•	•	•	SS	TS	GS	•	•
10	Cúcuta Deportivo (2)	•	•	•	•	•	•	•	SF	R16	•	•	•	•	•	•	•	•	•	•	•	•	•	•	•	•	•	•
11	Boyacá Chicó (2)	•	•	•	•	•	•	•	•	FS	GS	•	•	•	•	•	•	•	•	•	•	•	•	•	•	•	•	•
12	Cortuluá (1)	•	•	GS	•	•	•	•	•	•	•	•	•	•	•	•	•	•	•	•	•	•	•	•	•	•	•	•
13	Deportivo Pasto (1)	•	•	•	•	•	•	•	GS	•	•	•	•	•	•	•	•	•	•	•	•	•	•	•	•	•	•	•
14	Deportivo Pereira (1)	•	•	•	•	•	•	•	•	•	•	•	•	•	•	•	•	•	•	•	•	•	•	•	QF	•	•	•
15	Águilas Doradas (1)	•	•	•	•	•	•	•	•	•	•	•	•	•	•	•	•	•	•	•	•	•	•	•	•	SS	•	•
16	Atlético Bucaramanga (1)	•	•	•	•	•	•	•	•	•	•	•	•	•	•	•	•	•	•	•	•	•	•	•	•	•	GS	•
(Paraguay) PARAGUAY (92)		(3)	(3)	(3)	(4)	(3)	(3)	(3)	(3)	(3)	(3)	(3)	(3)	(3)	(3)	(3)	(3)	(3)	(4)	(4)	(4)	(4)	(4)	(4)	(4)	(4)	(4)	(4)
1	Cerro Porteño (23)	R16	R16	GS	R16	•	R16	GS	GS	FS	•	GS	SF	•	GS	R16	FS	R16	•	R16	QF	TS	R16	R16	GS	GS	R16	R16
2	Libertad (22)	•	•	•	GS	GS	GS	SF	QF	GS	R16	QF	QF	QF	GS	•	GS	•	GS	R16	R16	QF	TS	R16	GS	GS	R16	GS
3	Olimpia (16)	GS	GS	C	R16	GS	•	•	•	•	•	•	•	GS	F	•	•	GS	TS	SS	R16	GS	QF	GS	QF	•	GS	•
4	Guaraní (13)	•	GS	•	•	GS	•	•	•	•	GS	•	GS	•	•	FS	SF	FS	R16	TS	•	R16	SS	SS	•	•	•	SS
5	Nacional (9)	•	•	•	•	•	•	FS	•	•	GS	GS	•	GS	•	F	•	•	•	•	FS	•	•	•	SS	TS	FS	•
6	12 de Octubre (2)	•	•	GS	GS	•	•	•	•	•	•	•	•	•	•	•	•	•	•	•	•	•	•	•	•	•	•	•
7	Tacuary (2)	•	•	•	•	•	FS	•	FS	•	•	•	•	•	•	•	•	•	•	•	•	•	•	•	•	•	•	•
8	Colegiales (1)	GS	•	•	•	•	•	•	•	•	•	•	•	•	•	•	•	•	•	•	•	•	•	•	•	•	•	•
9	Sportivo Luqueño (1)	•	•	•	•	•	•	•	•	GS	•	•	•	•	•	•	•	•	•	•	•	•	•	•	•	•	•	•
10	Deportivo Capiatá (1)	•	•	•	•	•	•	•	•	•	•	•	•	•	•	•	•	•	TS	•	•	•	•	•	•	•	•	•
11	Sportivo Trinidense (1)	•	•	•	•	•	•	•	•	•	•	•	•	•	•	•	•	•	•	•	•	•	•	•	•	TS	•	•
12	2 de Mayo (1)	•	•	•	•	•	•	•	•	•	•	•	•	•	•	•	•	•	•	•	•	•	•	•	•	•	•	SS
(Chile) CHILE (91)		(3)	(3)	(3)	(3)	(3)	(3)	(3)	(3)	(3)	(3)	(3)	(3)	(3)	(3)	(3)	(3)	(3)	(4)	(4)	(4)	(4)	(4)	(4)	(4)	(4)	(4)	(4)
1	Colo-Colo (18)	•	•	•	GS	GS	FS	FS	R16	GS	GS	GS	GS	•	•	•	GS	GS	SS	QF	•	GS	•	GS	GS	QF	GS	•
2	Universidad de Chile (15)	GS	GS	•	•	•	R16	•	•	•	R16	SF	•	SF	GS	GS	GS	FS	•	GS	SS	SS	SS	•	•	•	GS	•
3	Universidad Católica (14)	GS	•	R16	GS	•	•	GS	•	GS	•	GS	QF	GS	•	•	•	•	GS	•	GS	GS	R16	GS	•	•	•	R16
4	Cobreloa (7)	GS	R16	R16	QF	GS	GS	•	FS	•	•	•	•	•	•	•	•	•	•	•	•	•	•	•	•	•	•	•
5	Unión Española (6)	•	•	•	•	•	•	GS	•	•	•	•	GS	R16	•	R16	•	•	TS	•	•	•	SS	•	•	•	•	•
6	Palestino (4)	•	•	•	•	•	•	•	•	•	•	•	•	•	•	•	GS	•	•	•	GS	TS	•	•	•	GS	•	•
7	Universidad de Concepción (3)	•	•	•	•	GS	•	•	•	•	•	•	•	•	•	•	•	•	•	SS	GS	•	•	•	•	•	•	•
8	Audax Italiano (3)	•	•	•	•	•	•	•	GS	GS	•	•	•	•	•	•	•	•	•	•	•	•	•	SS	•	•	•	•
9	Deportes Iquique (3)	•	•	•	•	•	•	•	•	•	•	•	•	•	GS	•	•	•	GS	•	•	•	•	•	•	•	TS	•
10	Huachipato (3)	•	•	•	•	•	•	•	•	•	•	•	•	•	GS	•	•	•	•	•	•	•	•	•	•	GS	•	SS
11	Santiago Wanderers (2)	•	•	GS	•	•	•	•	•	•	•	•	•	•	•	•	•	•	•	TS	•	•	•	•	•	•	•	•
12	Everton (2)	•	•	•	•	•	•	•	•	•	GS	•	•	•	•	•	•	•	•	•	•	•	•	TS	•	•	•	•
13	O'Higgins (2)	•	•	•	•	•	•	•	•	•	•	•	•	•	•	GS	•	•	•	•	•	•	•	•	•	•	•	TS
14	Cobresal (2)	•	•	•	•	•	•	•	•	•	•	•	•	•	•	•	•	GS	•	•	•	•	•	•	•	GS	•	•
15	Ñublense (2)	•	•	•	•	•	•	•	•	•	•	•	•	•	•	•	•	•	•	•	•	•	•	•	GS	•	SS	•
16	Deportes Concepción (1)	•	R16	•	•	•	•	•	•	•	•	•	•	•	•	•	•	•	•	•	•	•	•	•	•	•	•	•
17	Unión La Calera (1)	•	•	•	•	•	•	•	•	•	•	•	•	•	•	•	•	•	•	•	•	•	GS	•	•	•	•	•
19	Curicó Unido (1)	•	•	•	•	•	•	•	•	•	•	•	•	•	•	•	•	•	•	•	•	•	•	•	SS	•	•	•
19	Magallanes (1)	•	•	•	•	•	•	•	•	•	•	•	•	•	•	•	•	•	•	•	•	•	•	•	TS	•	•	•
20	Coquimbo Unido (1)	•	•	•	•	•	•	•	•	•	•	•	•	•	•	•	•	•	•	•	•	•	•	•	•	•	•	R16
Club (# of participations)		2000	2001	2002	2003	2004	2005	2006	2007	2008	2009	2010	2011	2012	2013	2014	2015	2016	2017	2018	2019	2020	2021	2022	2023	2024	2025	2026
(Uruguay) URUGUAY (91)		(3)	(3)	(3)	(3)	(3)	(3)	(3)	(3)	(3)	(3)	(3)	(3)	(3)	(3)	(3)	(3)	(3)	(4)	(4)	(4)	(4)	(4)	(4)	(4)	(4)	(4)	(4)
1	Nacional (26)	R16	R16	QF	R16	R16	GS	R16	QF	R16	SF	R16	GS	GS	R16	GS	FS	QF	R16	GS	R16	QF	GS	GS	R16	R16	GS	GS
2	Peñarol (19)	R16	GS	QF	GS	GS	FS	•	•	•	FS	•	F	GS	GS	GS	•	GS	GS	GS	GS	GS	•	GS	•	SF	R16	GS
3	Defensor Sporting (11)	•	GS	•	•	•	•	FS	QF	•	QF	•	•	GS	FS	SF	•	•	•	GS	TS	•	•	•	•	FS	FS	•
4	Montevideo Wanderers (6)	•	•	R16	•	•	•	•	•	FS	•	•	•	•	•	•	R16	•	SS	FS	•	•	SS	•	•	•	•	•
5	Danubio (5)	•	•	•	•	•	GS	•	FS	GS	•	•	•	•	•	•	GS	•	•	•	SS	•	•	•	•	•	•	•
6	Liverpool (5)	•	•	•	•	•	•	•	•	•	•	•	FS	•	•	•	•	•	•	•	•	•	FS	•	GS	GS	•	SS
7	Fénix (2)	•	•	•	GS	GS	•	•	•	•	•	•	•	•	•	•	•	•	•	•	•	•	•	•	•	•	•	•
8	Cerro (2)	•	•	•	•	•	•	•	•	•	•	GS	•	•	•	•	•	•	SS	•	•	•	•	•	•	•	•	•
9	Boston River (2)	•	•	•	•	•	•	•	•	•	•	•	•	•	•	•	•	•	•	•	•	•	•	•	SS	•	TS	•
10	Bella Vista (1)	GS	•	•	•	•	•	•	•	•	•	•	•	•	•	•	•	•	•	•	•	•	•	•	•	•	•	•
11	Rocha (1)	•	•	•	•	•	•	GS	•	•	•	•	•	•	•	•	•	•	•	•	•	•	•	•	•	•	•	•
12	Racing (1)	•	•	•	•	•	•	•	•	•	•	GS	•	•	•	•	•	•	•	•	•	•	•	•	•	•	•	•
13	River Plate (1)	•	•	•	•	•	•	•	•	•	•	•	•	•	•	•	•	GS	•	•	•	•	•	•	•	•	•	•
14	Cerro Largo (1)	•	•	•	•	•	•	•	•	•	•	•	•	•	•	•	•	•	•	•	•	SS	•	•	•	•	•	•
15	Progreso (1)	•	•	•	•	•	•	•	•	•	•	•	•	•	•	•	•	•	•	•	•	FS	•	•	•	•	•	•
16	Rentistas (1)	•	•	•	•	•	•	•	•	•	•	•	•	•	•	•	•	•	•	•	•	•	GS	•	•	•	•	•
17	Montevideo City Torque (1)	•	•	•	•	•	•	•	•	•	•	•	•	•	•	•	•	•	•	•	•	•	•	FS	•	•	•	•
18	Plaza Colonia (1)	•	•	•	•	•	•	•	•	•	•	•	•	•	•	•	•	•	•	•	•	•	•	SS	•	•	•	•
19	Deportivo Maldonado (1)	•	•	•	•	•	•	•	•	•	•	•	•	•	•	•	•	•	•	•	•	•	•	•	SS	•	•	•
20	Juventud (1)	•	•	•	•	•	•	•	•	•	•	•	•	•	•	•	•	•	•	•	•	•	•	•	•	•	•	TS
(Bolivia) BOLIVIA (91)		(3)	(3)	(3)	(3)	(3)	(3)	(3)	(3)	(3)	(3)	(3)	(3)	(3)	(3)	(3)	(3)	(3)	(4)	(4)	(4)	(4)	(4)	(4)	(4)	(4)	(4)	(4)
1	Bolívar (22)	QF	•	GS	GS	GS	GS	GS	GS	•	•	GS	FS	R16	FS	SF	•	GS	•	GS	FS	GS	SS	SS	QF	R16	GS	GS
2	The Strongest (21)	GS	GS	•	GS	GS	GS	GS	•	•	•	•	•	GS	GS	R16	GS	GS	R16	GS	SS	SS	GS	GS	GS	R16	SS	FS
3	Oriente Petrolero (9)	•	GS	GS	GS	•	FS	FS	•	•	•	•	GS	•	•	FS	•	FS	•	SS	•	•	•	•	•	•	•	•
4	Jorge Wilstermann (7)	•	GS	•	•	GS	•	•	•	•	•	•	GS	•	•	•	•	•	QF	TS	GS	R16	•	•	•	•	•	•
5	Real Potosí (6)	•	•	GS	•	•	•	•	GS	GS	FS	FS	•	FS	•	•	•	•	•	•	•	•	•	•	•	•	•	•
6	San José (5)	•	•	•	•	•	•	•	•	GS	•	•	•	•	GS	•	GS	•	•	•	GS	FS	•	•	•	•	•	•
7	Always Ready (5)	•	•	•	•	•	•	•	•	•	•	•	•	•	•	•	•	•	•	•	•	•	GS	GS	SS	TS	•	GS
8	Blooming (4)	GS	•	•	•	•	•	•	FS	•	•	GS	•	•	•	•	•	•	•	•	•	•	•	•	•	•	FS	•
9	Universitario de Sucre (3)	•	•	•	•	•	•	•	•	•	GS	•	•	•	•	•	R16	•	FS	•	•	•	•	•	•	•	•	•
10	Aurora (2)	•	•	•	•	•	•	•	•	•	GS	•	•	•	•	•	•	•	•	•	•	•	•	•	•	SS	•	•
11	Nacional Potosí (2)	•	•	•	•	•	•	•	•	•	•	•	•	•	•	•	•	•	•	•	•	•	•	•	FS	•	•	SS
12	La Paz (1)	•	•	•	•	•	•	•	•	FS	•	•	•	•	•	•	•	•	•	•	•	•	•	•	•	•	•	•
13	Sport Boys (1)	•	•	•	•	•	•	•	•	•	•	•	•	•	•	•	•	•	GS	•	•	•	•	•	•	•	•	•
14	Royal Pari (1)	•	•	•	•	•	•	•	•	•	•	•	•	•	•	•	•	•	•	•	•	•	FS	•	•	•	•	•
15	Independiente Petrolero (1)	•	•	•	•	•	•	•	•	•	•	•	•	•	•	•	•	•	•	•	•	•	•	GS	•	•	•	•
16	San Antonio Bulo Bulo (1)	•	•	•	•	•	•	•	•	•	•	•	•	•	•	•	•	•	•	•	•	•	•	•	•	•	GS	•
(Peru) PERU (91)		(3)	(3)	(3)	(3)	(3)	(3)	(3)	(3)	(3)	(3)	(3)	(3)	(3)	(3)	(3)	(3)	(3)	(4)	(4)	(4)	(4)	(4)	(4)	(4)	(4)	(4)	(4)
1	Sporting Cristal (22)	GS	GS	GS	GS	R16	GS	GS	FS	•	FS	•	•	•	GS	FS	GS	GS	GS	•	GS	SS	GS	GS	GS	SS	GS	GS
2	Alianza Lima (18)	GS	•	GS	GS	GS	GS	•	GS	•	•	R16	FS	GS	•	•	FS	•	•	GS	GS	GS	•	GS	GS	GS	GS	FS
3	Universitario (15)	GS	GS	•	GS	•	•	GS	•	•	GS	R16	•	•	•	GS	•	•	SS	FS	•	SS	GS	SS	•	GS	R16	GS
4	Melgar (7)	•	•	•	•	•	•	•	•	•	•	•	•	•	•	•	•	GS	GS	SS	GS	•	•	•	GS	FS	TS	•
5	Cienciano (6)	•	•	R16	•	GS	FS	GS	GS	GS	•	•	•	•	•	•	•	•	•	•	•	•	•	•	•	•	•	•
6	Cusco (5)	•	•	•	•	•	•	•	•	•	•	•	•	•	QF	GS	•	•	•	GS	FS	•	•	•	•	•	•	GS
7	Universidad César Vallejo (4)	•	•	•	•	•	•	•	•	•	•	•	•	•	FS	•	•	FS	•	•	•	•	FS	FS	•	•	•	•
8	Universidad San Martín (3)	•	•	•	•	•	•	•	•	GS	R16	•	GS	•	•	•	•	•	•	•	•	•	•	•	•	•	•	•
9	Juan Aurich (3)	•	•	•	•	•	•	•	•	•	•	GS	•	GS	•	•	GS	•	•	•	•	•	•	•	•	•	•	•
10	Sport Huancayo (2)	•	•	•	•	•	•	•	•	•	•	•	•	FS	•	•	•	•	•	•	•	•	•	•	FS	•	•	•
11	Sport Boys (1)	•	GS	•	•	•	•	•	•	•	•	•	•	•	•	•	•	•	•	•	•	•	•	•	•	•	•	•
12	Coronel Bolognesi (1)	•	•	•	•	•	•	•	•	GS	•	•	•	•	•	•	•	•	•	•	•	•	•	•	•	•	•	•
13	León de Huánuco (1)	•	•	•	•	•	•	•	•	•	•	•	GS	•	•	•	•	•	•	•	•	•	•	•	•	•	•	•
14	Deportivo Municipal (1)	•	•	•	•	•	•	•	•	•	•	•	•	•	•	•	•	•	FS	•	•	•	•	•	•	•	•	•
15	Binacional (1)	•	•	•	•	•	•	•	•	•	•	•	•	•	•	•	•	•	•	•	•	GS	•	•	•	•	•	•
16	Ayacucho (1)	•	•	•	•	•	•	•	•	•	•	•	•	•	•	•	•	•	•	•	•	•	SS	•	•	•	•	•
Club (# of participations)		2000	2001	2002	2003	2004	2005	2006	2007	2008	2009	2010	2011	2012	2013	2014	2015	2016	2017	2018	2019	2020	2021	2022	2023	2024	2025	2026
(Venezuela) VENEZUELA (87)		(2)	(2)	(2)	(2)	(3)	(3)	(3)	(3)	(3)	(3)	(3)	(3)	(3)	(3)	(3)	(3)	(3)	(4)	(4)	(4)	(4)	(4)	(4)	(4)	(4)	(4)	(4)
1	Deportivo Táchira (20)	FS	GS	•	•	QF	GS	FS	FS	•	GS	FS	GS	GS	•	•	GS	R16	FS	SS	•	SS	GS	GS	•	GS	GS	SS
2	Caracas (18)	•	•	FS	•	GS	GS	GS	R16	GS	QF	GS	GS	FS	GS	FS	•	FS	•	•	TS	GS	SS	GS	•	GS	•	•
3	Zamora (6)	•	•	•	•	•	•	•	•	•	•	•	•	GS	•	GS	GS	•	GS	•	GS	•	•	•	FS	•	•	•
4	Carabobo (6)	•	•	•	•	•	•	•	•	•	•	•	•	•	•	•	•	•	SS	SS	•	FS	•	•	SS	•	GS	TS
5	Deportivo Lara (5)	•	•	•	•	•	•	•	•	•	•	•	•	•	GS	•	•	•	•	GS	GS	•	SS	FS	•	•	•	•
6	Deportivo Petare (4)	FS	FS	•	•	•	•	•	•	•	•	GS	FS	•	•	•	•	•	•	•	•	•	•	•	•	•	•	•
7	Maracaibo (4)	•	•	•	•	GS	•	GS	GS	GS	•	•	•	•	•	•	•	•	•	•	•	•	•	•	•	•	•	•
8	Monagas (4)	•	•	•	•	•	•	•	•	•	•	•	•	•	•	•	•	•	•	GS	•	•	•	SS	GS	•	SS	•
9	Mineros de Guayana (3)	•	•	•	•	•	FS	•	•	FS	•	•	•	•	•	•	GS	•	•	•	•	•	•	•	•	•	•	•
10	Deportivo Anzoátegui (3)	•	•	•	•	•	•	•	•	•	FS	•	•	•	FS	GS	•	•	•	•	•	•	•	•	•	•	•	•
11	Deportivo La Guaira (3)	•	•	•	•	•	•	•	•	•	•	•	•	•	•	•	•	•	•	•	SS	•	GS	•	•	•	•	GS
12	Trujillanos (2)	•	•	FS	•	•	•	•	•	•	•	•	•	•	•	•	•	GS	•	•	•	•	•	•	•	•	•	•
13	Estudiantes de Mérida (2)	•	•	•	FS	•	•	•	•	•	•	•	•	•	•	•	•	•	•	•	•	GS	•	•	•	•	•	•
14	Universidad Central (2)	•	•	•	•	•	•	•	•	•	•	•	•	•	•	•	•	•	•	•	•	•	•	•	•	•	SS	GS
15	Nacional Táchira (1)	•	•	•	FS	•	•	•	•	•	•	•	•	•	•	•	•	•	•	•	•	•	•	•	•	•	•	•
16	Zulia (1)	•	•	•	•	•	•	•	•	•	•	•	•	•	•	•	•	•	GS	•	•	•	•	•	•	•	•	•
17	Metropolitanos (1)	•	•	•	•	•	•	•	•	•	•	•	•	•	•	•	•	•	•	•	•	•	•	•	GS	•	•	•
18	Academia Puerto Cabello (1)	•	•	•	•	•	•	•	•	•	•	•	•	•	•	•	•	•	•	•	•	•	•	•	•	SS	•	•
19	Portuguesa (1)	•	•	•	•	•	•	•	•	•	•	•	•	•	•	•	•	•	•	•	•	•	•	•	•	SS	•	•
(Mexico) MEXICO (48)		(2)	(2)	(2)	(2)	(2)	(3)	(3)	(3)	(3)	(3)	(5)	(3)	(3)	(3)	(3)	(3)	(3)	(0)	(0)	(0)	(0)	(0)	(0)	(0)	(0)	(0)	(0)
1	América (6)	SF	•	SF	•	R16	•	•	QF	SF	•	•	R16	•	•	•	•	•	•	•	•	•	•	•	•	•	•	•
2	Guadalajara (6)	•	•	•	•	•	SF	SF	•	GS	R16	F	•	GS	•	•	•	•	•	•	•	•	•	•	•	•	•	•
3	Morelia (4)	•	•	QF	•	•	•	•	•	•	•	GS	•	•	•	FS	FS	•	•	•	•	•	•	•	•	•	•	•
4	UANL (4)	•	•	•	•	•	QF	R16	•	•	•	•	•	FS	•	•	F	•	•	•	•	•	•	•	•	•	•	•
5	Atlas (3)	QF	•	•	•	•	•	•	•	QF	•	•	•	•	•	•	GS	•	•	•	•	•	•	•	•	•	•	•
6	Cruz Azul (3)	•	F	•	QF	•	•	•	•	•	•	•	•	R16	•	•	•	•	•	•	•	•	•	•	•	•	•	•
7	UNAM (3)	•	•	•	R16	•	•	GS	•	•	•	•	•	•	•	•	•	QF	•	•	•	•	•	•	•	•	•	•
8	Toluca (3)	•	•	•	•	•	•	•	R16	•	•	•	•	•	GS	•	•	R16	•	•	•	•	•	•	•	•	•	•
9	San Luis (3)	•	•	•	•	•	•	•	•	•	R16	R16	GS	•	•	•	•	•	•	•	•	•	•	•	•	•	•	•
10	Santos Laguna (2)	•	•	•	•	R16	•	•	•	•	•	•	•	•	•	R16	•	•	•	•	•	•	•	•	•	•	•	•
11	Pachuca (2)	•	•	•	•	•	R16	•	•	•	FS	•	•	•	•	•	•	•	•	•	•	•	•	•	•	•	•	•
12	Necaxa (2)	•	•	•	•	•	•	•	R16	•	•	•	•	•	•	•	•	•	•	•	•	•	•	•	•	•	•	•
13	León (2)	•	•	•	•	•	•	•	•	•	•	•	•	•	FS	R16	•	•	•	•	•	•	•	•	•	•	•	•
14	Atlante (1)	•	FS	•	•	•	•	•	•	•	•	•	•	•	•	•	•	•	•	•	•	•	•	•	•	•	•	•
15	Monterrey (1)	•	•	•	•	•	•	•	•	•	•	GS	•	•	•	•	•	•	•	•	•	•	•	•	•	•	•	•
16	Tecos (1)	•	•	•	•	•	•	•	•	•	•	FS	•	•	•	•	•	•	•	•	•	•	•	•	•	•	•	•
17	Chiapas (1)	•	•	•	•	•	•	•	•	•	•	•	QF	•	•	•	•	•	•	•	•	•	•	•	•	•	•	•
18	Tijuana (1)	•	•	•	•	•	•	•	•	•	•	•	•	•	QF	•	•	•	•	•	•	•	•	•	•	•	•	•
19	Puebla (1)	•	•	•	•	•	•	•	•	•	•	•	•	•	•	•	•	FS	•	•	•	•	•	•	•	•	•	•
Club (# of participations)		2000	2001	2002	2003	2004	2005	2006	2007	2008	2009	2010	2011	2012	2013	2014	2015	2016	2017	2018	2019	2020	2021	2022	2023	2024	2025	2026

== See also ==
- Copa Libertadores
- Copa Libertadores records and statistics
- List of Copa Libertadores finals
