= Henrique da Silva (footballer) =

Brazilian footballer (born 1972)

Henrique Eduardo da Silva (born June 23, 1972 in Arraial do Cabo) is a former football defender from Brazil. His most common position in defense was left-back.

== Career ==
Da Silva started his career at local club Cabofriense before playing for several Paraguayan clubs such as Cerro Corá, Sport Colombia and Cerro Porteño before moving to Argentina where he had brief stints playing for Platense in 1998 and Ferro Carril Oeste in 1999.

Da Silva came back to Paraguay in 2000 to join Club Olimpia (Olimpia Asunción), where he spent the best years of his career until 2003, winning the Paraguayan Primera División championship and two CONMEBOL international tournaments (Copa Libertadores and Recopa Sudamericana). He also played in Brazil for Atlético Mineiro.

== Titles ==
Season	Team	Title
2000	(Paraguay) Olimpia	Paraguayan Primera División
2002	(Paraguay) Olimpia	Copa Libertadores
2003	(Paraguay) Olimpia	Recopa Sudamericana
