= Juan Carlos Franco =

Paraguayan footballer (born 1973)

Personal information
- Date of birth: 17 April 1973 (age 53)
- Place of birth: Asunción, Paraguay
- Position: Midfielder

Senior career*
Years	Team	Apps	(Gls)
1992–2005	Olimpia Asunción		

International career
1998–2002	Paraguay	5	(0)
- * Club domestic league appearances and goals

Juan Carlos Franco (born 17 April 1973) is a former Paraguayan footballer who played as a midfielder.

Franco, a one club man, started and ended his career at Olimpia Asunción of Paraguay where he became a fan-favorite because of his loyalty and contributions to the club. He represented Paraguay at the 2002 FIFA World Cup.

== Titles ==
- Paraguayan League Champion: 1993, 1995, 1997, 1998, 1999, 2000 (with Olimpia Asunción)
- Copa Libertadores: 2002 (with Olimpia Asunción)
- Recopa Sudamericana: 2003 (with Olimpia Asunción)
- Supercopa Sudamericana: 1990 (with Olimpia Asunción)
