= Julio César Enciso =

Julio César Enciso or Julio Enciso may refer to:

- Julio César Enciso (footballer, born 1974), Paraguayan association football player
- Julio Enciso (footballer, born 2004), Paraguayan association football player
