= Wágner (footballer, born 1973) =

Brazilian footballer

Personal information
- Full name: Wágner Pires de Almeida
- Date of birth: 27 December 1973 (age 52)
- Place of birth: Porto Alegre, Brazil
- Height: 1.76 m (5 ft 9 1/2 in)
- Position: Striker

Senior career*
Years	Team	Apps	(Gls)
1995–1996	XV Novembro-Piracicaba		
1997	União São João		
1998	Mirassol		
1999	Botafogo-SP		
2000	Santo André		
2001	São Caetano		
2001	Cerezo Osaka	8	(0)
2002	São Caetano		
2003	Guarani	46	(15)
2004	Atlético Mineiro		
2005	Figueirense		
2005	Guarani	22	(3)
2005–2006	Pogoń Szczecin	7	(0)
2006	Adap Galo Maringá		
2007	Uberlândia		
2008	União São João		
2008	Comercial-MS		
2008	América-RN		
- * Club domestic league appearances and goals

Wágner Pires de Almeida (born 27 December 1973) is a Brazilian former professional footballer who played as a striker.

== Club statistics ==
Club performance			League		Cup		League Cup		Total	
Club	Season	League	Apps	Goals	Apps	Goals	Apps	Goals	Apps	Goals
Cerezo Osaka	2001	J1 League	8	0	0	0	0	0	8	0
Total			8	0	0	0	0	0	8	0
