= Japinha (footballer) =

Brazilian footballer

Personal information
- Full name: Adnílson Castelini
- Date of birth: 21 May 1972 (age 54)
- Place of birth: São Paulo, Brazil
- Position: Right back

Senior career*
Years	Team	Apps	(Gls)
1992	Matonense		
1993–1996	Botafogo-SP		
1997–1999	Juventus-SP		
1999	Sampaio Corrêa		
2000–2001	São Caetano		
2001–2002	Bahia		
2002	→ Etti Jundiaí (loan)		
2003	Ipatinga		
2003	Avaí		
2004	Bandeirante		
2006	Araçatuba		

Managerial career
- 2019–2021: Comercial (football director)
- * Club domestic league appearances and goals as of 13 October 2023

Adnílson Castelini (born 21 May 1972), better known as Japinha, is a Brazilian former professional footballer who played as a right back.

== Career ==
Having played for several clubs, Japinha gained prominence in the campaign of AD São Caetano, runner-up in the 2000 Copa João Havelange. In 2019, he became football director at Comercial de Ribeirão Preto.

== Honours ==
Bahia

- Copa do Nordeste: 2001
