= Jean Carlos (footballer, born 1974) =

Brazilian footballer (1974–2024)

Personal information
- Full name: Jean Carlos da Conceição
- Date of birth: 29 January 1974
- Place of birth: Rio de Janeiro, Brazil
- Date of death: 27 February 2024 (aged 50)
- Place of death: Santa Bárbara d'Oeste, São Paulo, Brazil
- Height: 1.81 m (5 ft 11 in)
- Position: Forward

Youth career
- 1990–1992: Bangu

Senior career*
Years	Team	Apps	(Gls)
1992–1994	Bangu		
1994–1996	Guarani		
1996	Anápolis		
1996–1997	Juventude		
1998–2002	Etti Jundiaí		
1998	→ Palmeiras (loan)		
2002	São Caetano		
2003	Ituano		
2003	Bahia		
2004	Santo André		
2005–2006	Paulista		
2007	Remo		
- * Club domestic league appearances and goals

Jean Carlos da Conceição (29 January 1974 – 27 February 2024), simply known as Jean Carlos, was a Brazilian professional footballer who played as a forward.

== Career ==
Discovered by Bangu, Jean Carlos arrived at Guarani in 1992, standing out for the team. It was purchased by the Parmalat group and passed on to teams that at the time were part of the holding, such as EC Juventude and Etti Jundiaí (now called Paulista), where Jean Carlos was Série C champion and top scorer in 2001. He had a brief spell at Palmeiras in 1998, in addition to being part of the 2004 Copa do Brasil champion squad with Santo André.

== Death ==
Jean Carlos died from prostate cancer in Santa Bárbara d'Oeste, São Paulo, on 27 February 2024. He was 50.

== Honours ==
Paulista

- Campeonato Brasileiro Série C: 2001
- Campeonato Paulista Série A2: 2001
- Copa Paulista: 1999

Santo André

- Copa do Brasil: 2004

Individual

- 2001 Campeonato Brasileiro Série C top scorer: 14 goals
