= 2003 Recopa Sudamericana =

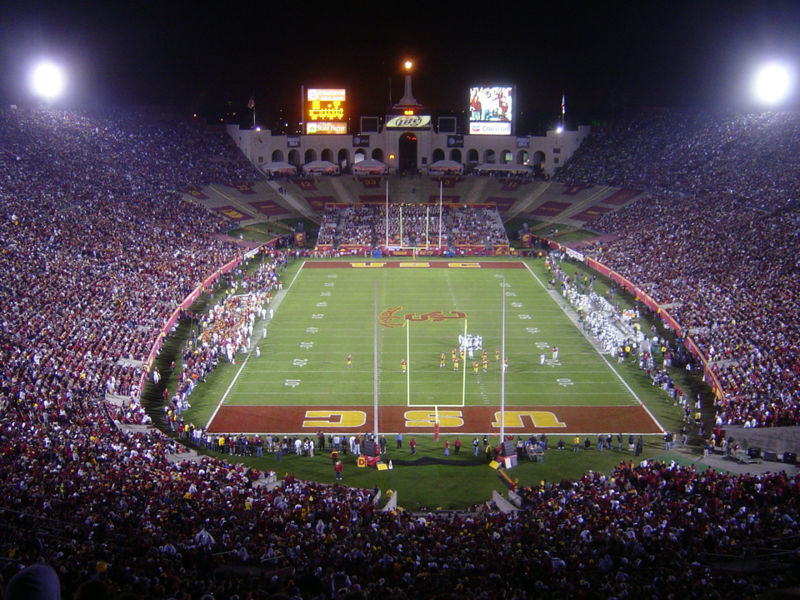
- Los Angeles Memorial Coliseum, venue
- Event: Recopa Sudamericana
Olimpia	San Lorenzo
(Paraguay)	(Argentina)
2	0
- Date: July 12, 2003
- Venue: Memorial Coliseum, Los Angeles
- Referee: Carlos Eugênio Simon (Brazil)
- Attendance: 8,000

The 2003 Recopa Sudamericana was the 11th edition of the match-up contested between the winners of CONMEBOL's two continental tournaments. This was the first Recopa contested since 1999 when the competition was discontinued due to the Supercopa Sudamericana folding in 1997. However, in 2002 the Copa Sudamericana was created to serve as the second most important continental trophy. Thus, the Recopa Sudamericana became playable again pitting the winners of the Copa Libertadores and Copa Sudamericana. The first Recopa Sudamericana under this format took place in a single final held at Los Angeles Memorial Coliseum in Los Angeles.

The match was contested by Olimpia, winners of the 2002 Copa Libertadores, and San Lorenzo de Almagro, winners of the 2002 Copa Sudamericana, on July 12, 2003. Olimpia defeated San Lorenzo to win their second Recopa Sudamericana.

== Qualified teams ==
Team	Previous finals app.
(Paraguay) Olimpia	**1991**
(Argentina) San Lorenzo	None

Bold indicates winning years

== Match details ==
2003 Recopa Sudamericana
July 12, 2003
19:00 (UTC-7)

Olimpia (Paraguay)	2–0	(Argentina) San Lorenzo
López 28'; Enciso 69' (pen.)	Report

Memorial Coliseum, Los Angeles
Attendance: 8,000
Referee: Carlos Eugênio Simon (Brazil)

**Olimpia**	**San Lorenzo**

GK	1	(Paraguay) Ricardo Tavarelli
DF	2	(Paraguay) Néstor Isasi
DF	5	(Paraguay) Julio César Cáceres
DF	3	(Paraguay) Nelson Zelaya
DF	15	(Uruguay) Mateo Corbo
MF	16	(Uruguay) Sergio Órteman
MF	6	(Paraguay) Julio César Enciso (c)
MF	17	(Paraguay) Francisco Esteche
MF	11	(Paraguay) Guido Alvarenga	(yellow card) 52'
FW	10	(Paraguay) Miguel Ángel Benítez		(substituted off) 65'
FW	9	(Paraguay) Hernán Rodrigo López		(substituted off) 83'
Substitutes:
FW	20	(Paraguay) Gilberto Palacios		(substituted on) 65'
FW	20	(Paraguay) Mauro Caballero		(substituted on) 83'
Manager:
(Uruguay) Luis Cubilla

GK	1	(Argentina) Sebastián Saja
DF	13	(Argentina) Leandro Álvarez
DF	32	(Argentina) Gonzalo Rodríguez	(yellow card) 48'
DF	3	(Paraguay) Claudio Morel Rodríguez
DF	4	(Argentina) Aldo Paredes
MF	24	(Argentina) Damián Luna
MF	5	(Argentina) Pablo Michelini (c)
MF	8	(Argentina) Mariano Herrón	(yellow card) 43'
FW	22	(Argentina) Cristian Zurita	(substituted off) 58'
FW	9	(Argentina) Alberto Acosta
FW	6	(Argentina) Nicolás Frutos
Substitutes:
FW	17	(Argentina) Daniel Cordone	(substituted on) 58'
Manager:
(Argentina) Rubén Insúa
