= Miguel Ángel Benítez (footballer) =

Paraguayan footballer (born 1970)

Personal information
- Full name: Miguel Ángel Benítez Pavón
- Date of birth: 19 May 1970 (age 56)
- Place of birth: Santísima Trinidad, Paraguay
- Height: 1.70 m (5 ft 7 in)
- Position: Forward

Senior career*
Years	Team	Apps	(Gls)
1987–1992	Calpe FC		
1993–1995	Atlético Madrid	10	(0)
1994	→ Almería (loan)		
1995	→ Mérida (loan)	23	(10)
1995–2001	Espanyol	147	(28)
2002–2003	Olimpia	41	(8)
2003–2004	Almería	9	(1)
2004–2005	Universitario	7	(0)
2006	Sportivo Luqueño	24	(2)
2006	Olimpia	9	(1)
2007	Guaraní		

International career
1996–1999	Paraguay	30	(11)

Managerial career
- 2008–2009: Silvio Pettirossi
- * Club domestic league appearances and goals

Miguel Ángel Benítez Pavón (born 19 May 1970), also known as Peque Benítez, is a Paraguayan retired footballer who played as a forward.

He is best known for his spell with Spain's Espanyol, where he played for seven years. Altogether he spent one full decade in that country, representing three other teams and appearing in more than 200 official games overall.

A Paraguayan international in the late 1990s, Benítez represented the nation at the 1998 World Cup.

== Club career ==
Benítez was born in Santísima Trinidad (Asunción). After playing for modest clubs in his country he arrived in Spain at the age of 23, purchased by Atlético Madrid, but appeared very rarely for the Colchoneros, being often demoted to its reserves and also being loaned twice, notably to CP Mérida which he helped promote from the second division by scoring a team-best ten goals in only five months.

Released by Atlético in the 1995 summer, Benítez signed with fellow La Liga side RCD Espanyol, going on to experience his best years: alternating between the starting XI and the bench, he amassed 166 competitive appearances for the Catalans, helping them to the 2000 conquest of the Copa del Rey.

Already in his 30s and dealing with some injuries, Benítez left Espanyol in January 2002, returning to his country and signing with Asunción's Club Olimpia. In his first year with Olimpia he helped the team to win Copa Libertadores, and the following season he won Recopa Sudamericana. In the years until his retirement he appeared for several clubs, and also returned to Spain, playing with UD Almería in the second level.

Benítez started his coaching career in 2008, taking charge of lowly Club Silvio Pettirossi as it was experiencing its first season in the Primera División – short-lived, as the side dropped down two tiers in as many years.

== International career ==
Courtesy of his solid Espanyol performances, Benítez gained all of his 30 caps for the Paraguay national team. He was selected for the 1998 FIFA World Cup, playing in all four matches as the country reached the round-of-16 and netting in the 3–1 group stage win over Nigeria.

Benítez was also selected for the 1999 Copa América, played on home soil, scoring three times: this included one in Paraguay's 1–1 quarter-final clash against Uruguay, where he also missed the decisive penalty shootout attempt.

=== International goals ===
No.	Date	Venue	Opponent	Score	Result	Competition
1.	10 November 1996	Defensores del Chaco, Asunción, Paraguay	Ecuador	1–0	1–0	1998 FIFA World Cup qualification
2.	12 January 1997	Guillermo Soto Rosa, Mérida, Venezuela	Venezuela	0–1	0–2	1998 FIFA World Cup qualification
3.	10 September 1997	Defensores del Chaco, Asunción, Paraguay	Bolivia	1–0	2–1	1998 FIFA World Cup qualification
4.	8 February 1998	Defensores del Chaco, Asunción, Paraguay	Poland	1–0	4–0	Friendly
5.	18 March 1998	Estadio Azteca, Mexico City, Mexico	Mexico	0–1	1–1	Friendly
6.	29 March 1998	Yale Bowl, New Haven, United States	Colombia	1–1	1–1	Friendly
7.	24 June 1998	Stade de Toulouse, Toulouse, France	Nigeria	1–2	1–3	1998 FIFA World Cup
8.	2 July 1999	Defensores del Chaco, Asunción, Paraguay	Japan	1–0	4–0	1999 Copa América
9.	2 July 1999	Defensores del Chaco, Asunción, Paraguay	Japan	3–0	4–0	1999 Copa América
10.	10 July 1999	Defensores del Chaco, Asunción, Paraguay	Uruguay	0–1	1–1	1999 Copa América
11.	17 November 1999	Domingo Burgueño, Maldonado, Uruguay	Uruguay	0–1	0–1	Friendly

== Honours ==
Espanyol

- Copa del Rey: 1999–2000

Olimpia

- Copa Libertadores: 2002
- Recopa Sudamericana: 2003
