= Adãozinho (footballer, born 1968) =

Brazilian footballer

Personal information
- Full name: José Amadeu Elvino
- Date of birth: 11 May 1968 (age 58)
- Place of birth: Caconde, Brazil
- Position: Midfielder

Youth career
- –1988: Bragantino

Senior career*
Years	Team	Apps	(Gls)
1988–1991	Bragantino		
1992	Alfenense		
1993	Rio Claro		
1993–1994	Alfenense		
1994	Sete de Setembro-MG		
1995	Francana		
1995	Goiatuba		
1996–1997	União Barbarense		
1997–1998	Sampaio Corrêa	3	(1)
1998–1999	Noroeste		
1999	Ceará		
2000	Yverdon-Sport	21	(5)
2000–2002	São Caetano	156	(14)
2001	→ Santo André	9	(5)
2003–2004	Palmeiras	58	(4)
2005	Atlético Sorocaba	11	
2005	Bragantino		
2005	União Barbarense	4	
2006	Bragantino	13	(3)
2006	América Mineiro		
2007	Rio Claro	10	
2007	América de Natal	8	
2007	Bragantino	1	
2007	Oeste	7	
2008	Londrina		
2008	Itapirense	7	
2009–2010	Bragantino	26	(2)
2010	Penapolense	6	
2011	Flamengo de Guarulhos	8	
2011	Atibaia	4	

Managerial career
- 2013: Jacutinga
- 2014: Conilon Jaguaré
- 2019–2020: São Caetano
- * Club domestic league appearances and goals

José Amadeu Elvino (born 11 May 1968), better known as Adãozinho, is a Brazilian former professional football player and manager who played as a midfielder.

== Playing career ==
Having played for several clubs, Adãozinho gained prominence for being part of the squad that won the 1990 Campeonato Paulista title, and in 2000 for AD São Caetano, twice runner-up in Brazil and the Libertadores. And in 2003 he transferred to Palmeiras, but did not establish himself.

In 2002 Copa Libertadores, in São Caetano's match against Cobreloa, he threw a punch at the player Javier Meléndez, being sent off, and causing a widespread fight.

== Managerial career ==
As a coach Adãozinho managed three clubs, the last being São Caetano in 2019 and early 2020.

== Honours ==
Bragantino

- Campeonato Paulista: 1990

Sampaio Corrêa

- Campeonato Maranhense: 1997, 1998
- Campeonato Brasileiro Série C: 1997

Palmeiras

- Campeonato Brasileiro Série B: 2003
