= José Amarilla =

Argentine footballer (born 1985)

Personal information
- Full name: José Alberto Amarilla Ayala
- Date of birth: 23 February 1985 (age 41)
- Place of birth: Resistencia, Argentina
- Position: Midfielder

Team information
- Current team: Independiente F.B.C.

Youth career
- Sarmiento de Resistencia
- 2004: Sportivo Resistencia

Senior career*
Years	Team	Apps	(Gls)
2005–2007	Olimpia		
2007	3 de Febrero		
2008	Cúcuta Deportivo	12	(5)
2009–2010	12 de Octubre		
2011	Santa Helena	14	(0)
2011–	Independiente F.B.C.		
- * Club domestic league appearances and goals

José Alberto Amarilla Ayala (born 23 February 1985, in Resistencia) is an Argentinian football midfielder who plays for Independiente F.B.C.

Amarilla played previously for Sportivo Resistencia, in Colombia for Cúcuta Deportivo, in Brazil for Santa Helena Esporte Clube and in Paraguay for 12 de Octubre, Club Atlético 3 de Febrero and Olimpia Asuncion.
