= Dininho =

Brazilian footballer (born 1975)

Personal information
- Full name: Irondino Ferreira Neto
- Date of birth: July 23, 1975 (age 51)
- Place of birth: Itapagipe, MG, Brazil
- Height: 1.83 m (6 ft 0 in)
- Position: Centre-back

Senior career*
Years	Team	Apps	(Gls)
1993–1997	Mirassol		
1994	→ Matsubara (loan)		
1995	→ Presidente Prudente (loan)		
1996	→ Mogi Mirim (loan)		
1997	→ América-SP (loan)		
1997–2005	São Caetano	113	(0)
2005–2006	Sanfrecce Hiroshima	35	(1)
2006–2008	Palmeiras	42	(4)
2008	Flamengo	8	(0)
2009	Santo André	1	(0)
2010	Mirassol	9	(0)
2011	Grêmio Catanduvense	6	(0)
- * Club domestic league appearances and goals

Irondino Ferreira Neto or simply Dininho (born July 23, 1975), is a Brazilian former professional footballer who played as a centre-back.

== Career statistics ==
Appearances and goals by club, season and competition
Club	Season	League			State league		National cup (Note: Includes Emperor's Cup.)		League cup (Note: Includes J.League Cup.)		Total	
Club	Season	Division	Apps	Goals	Apps	Goals	Apps	Goals	Apps	Goals	Apps	Goals
Sanfrecce Hiroshima	2005	J1 League	30	1	–		1	0	5	0	36	1
Sanfrecce Hiroshima	2006	J1 League	5	0	–		0	0	1	0	6	0
Sanfrecce Hiroshima	Total		35	1	0	0	1	0	6	0	42	1
Flamengo	2008		8	0			–		–		8	0
Career total			43	1	0	0	1	0	6	0	50	1

== Honours ==
- São Caetano
  - São Paulo State Championship: 2004
- Palmeiras
  - São Paulo State Championship: 2008
