= Aílton (footballer, born 1968) =

Brazilian footballer

Aílton Delfino
Personal information
- Date of birth: 1 September 1968 (age 58)
- Place of birth: Belo Horizonte, Brazil
- Height: 1.78 m (5 ft 10 in)
- Position: Forward

Senior career*
Years	Team	Apps	(Gls)
1987–1993	Atlético Mineiro	72	(8)
1993–1996	Benfica	32	(11)
1994–1995	→ São Paulo (loan)	29	(13)
1996	São Paulo	0	(0)
1996–1997	Cruzeiro	19	(6)
1997–1999	Portuguesa	57	(9)
2000–2002	São Caetano	16	(1)
2003	Santo André		
2003	América Mineiro		
Total		225	(48)
- * Club domestic league appearances and goals

Aílton Delfino (born 1 September 1968) is a retired Brazilian professional footballer who played as a striker.

== Career ==
Born in Belo Horizonte, Aílton is a youth product of Atlético Mineiro, making his debut in 1987, and taking part in the conquest of three Campeonato Mineiro, in 1988, 1989 and 1991, and one Copa CONMEBOL.

In 1993, Aílton joined Benfica, as the alternative for Adolfo Valencia after negotiations with the Colombian failed. He made his debut on a friendly against FC Barcelona on 18 August 1993, scoring the 2–1 in the 73rd minute. His first season in Portugal was a success, as he help the Lisbon-side win the league title, scoring 14 goals in 33 games, notably the first against Porto on 6 February 1994.

In his second season, Artur Jorge made several changes in the squad, with Aílton being loaned out to São Paulo until June 1995. He returned to Portugal for a six-month spell in 1995, without much success, moving permanently to São Paulo in January 1996.

At São Paulo, he won the Copa Master de CONMEBOL, scoring one goal in the semifinal against Botafogo. He then passed through five more clubs, notably helping São Caetano finish runner-up in the Série A in 2000 and 2001, plus starting both games of the 2002 Copa Libertadores Finals.

== Honours ==
Atlético Mineiro

- Campeonato Mineiro: 1988, 1989, 1991
- Copa CONMEBOL: 1992

Benfica

- Primeira Liga: 1993–94
- Taça de Portugal: 1995–96

São Paulo

- Copa Master de CONMEBOL: 1996

Cruzeiro

- Copa Libertadores: 1997
