= Daniel da Silva (footballer, born 1973) =

Brazilian footballer

Personal information
- Full name: Daniel da Silva
- Date of birth: 27 May 1973 (age 53)
- Place of birth: São Paulo, Brazil
- Height: 1.89 m (6 ft 2 in)
- Position: Defender

Senior career*
Years	Team	Apps	(Gls)
1996	Matonense		
1997–1998	Santos		
1998	→ Verdy Kawasaki (loan)	5	(0)
1999–2002	São Caetano		
2003–2006	Palmeiras		
2007	São Caetano		

International career
2002	Brazil	1	(0)
- * Club domestic league appearances and goals

Daniel da Silva (born 27 May 1973 in São Paulo) is a Brazilian former footballer.

He had one international appearance for Brazil on 6 February 2002, a friendly match against Saudi Arabia.

== Club statistics ==
Club performance			League	
Season	Club	League	Apps	Goals
Brazil			League	
1995	União São João	Série A	10	1
1996	Santos	Série A	8	0
1997	Santos	Série A	1	0
Japan			League	
1998	Verdy Kawasaki	J1 League	5	0
Brazil			League	
1999	São Caetano	Série B		
2000	São Caetano	Série A	8	0
2001	São Caetano	Série A	22	1
2002	São Caetano	Série A	17	2
2003	São Caetano	Série A	4	0
2004	Palmeiras	Série A	15	0
2005	Palmeiras	Série A	32	7
2006	Palmeiras	Série A	12	2
2007	São Caetano	Série B	5	0
Country	Brazil		134	13
Country	Japan		5	0
Total			139	13

== National team statistics ==
Brazil national team
Year	Apps	Goals
2002	1	0
Total	1	0

== Honours and awards ==
- Copa Libertadores Runner up : 2002
