= Anaílson =

Brazilian footballer (born 1978)

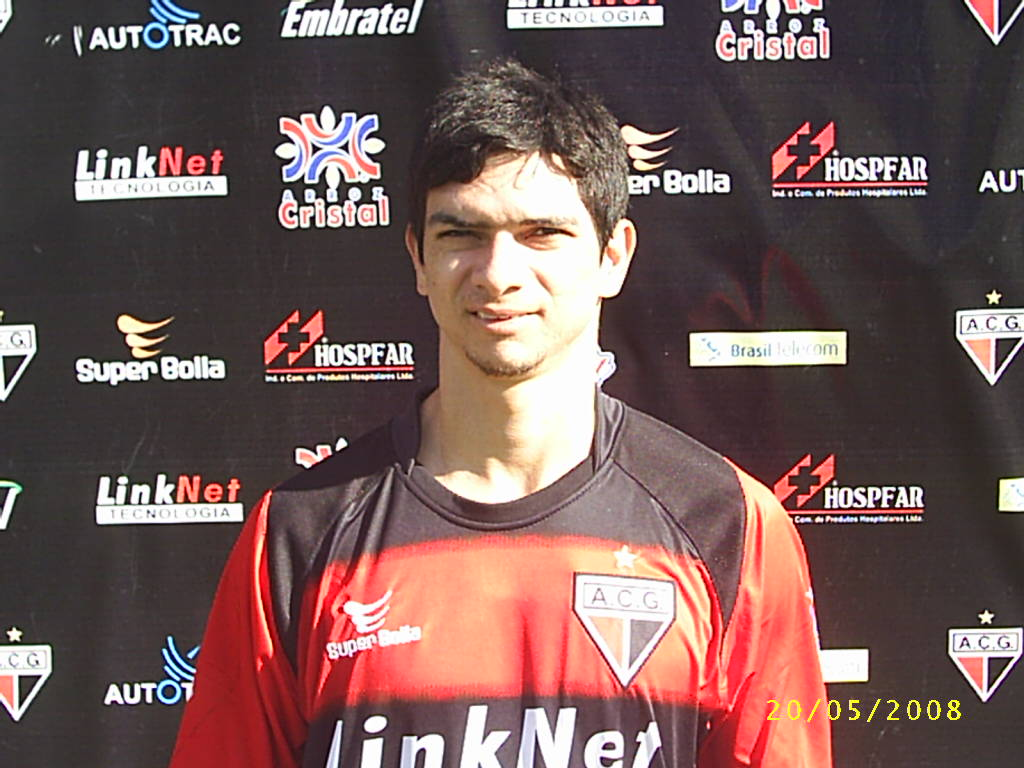
- Anaílson in 2008

Personal information
- Full name: Anaílson Brito Noleto
- Date of birth: 8 March 1978 (age 48)
- Place of birth: Estreito, Brazil
- Height: 1.64 m (5 ft 5 in)
- Position: Attacking midfielder

Senior career*
Years	Team	Apps	(Gls)
1998–2001	Rio Branco-SP		
2001–2005	São Caetano		
2005	Marília		
2005	Náutico		
2006	Tokyo Verdy	19	(0)
2006	Santo André		
2007–2011	Atlético Goianiense	176	(27)
2012	XV de Piracicaba	2	(0)
2012	Rio Verde-GO	9	(1)
2012	Sobradinho	7	(0)
2013	Anápolis	12	(0)
2013–2014	Tocantinópolis		
2015–2017	Imperatriz		
- * Club domestic league appearances and goals

Anaílson Brito Noleto, known as Anaílson (born 8 March 1978) is a Brazilian former professional footballer who played as attacking midfielder.

== Career ==
Anaílson played for Brazilian football clubs like Rio Branco, São Caetano and Náutico. He also won the FIFA U-17 World Cup for Brazil, later being punished for having falsified his birth date to play in the competition.

== Career statistics ==
Club performance			League	
Season	Club	League	Apps	Goals
Brazil			League	
2001	São Caetano	Série A	27	7
2002	São Caetano	Série A	17	0
2003	São Caetano	Série A	19	1
2004	São Caetano	Série A	7	0
2005	São Caetano	Série A	3	0
2005	Marília	Série B		
Japan			League	
2006	Tokyo Verdy	J2 League	19	0
Brazil			League	
2006	Atlético Goianiense	Série C		
2007	Atlético Goianiense	Série C		
2008	Atlético Goianiense	Série C		
2009	Atlético Goianiense	Série B		
Country	Brazil		73	8
Country	Japan		19	0
Total			92	8

== Honours ==
São Caetano

- Campeonato Paulista: 2004

Atlético Goianiense

- Campeonato Goianiense: 2008, 2010
- Campeonato Brasileiro Série C: 2008
