= Gastón Córdoba =

Argentine footballer

Personal information
- Full name: Fernando Gastón Córdoba
- Date of birth: 12 June 1974 (age 52)
- Place of birth: San Nicolás, Argentina
- Height: 1.76 m (5 ft 9 in)
- Position: Midfielder

Senior career*
Years	Team	Apps	(Gls)
1993–1996	Estudiantes	41	(6)
1996–1998	Racing Club	34	(0)
1998	Sampdoria	1	(0)
1999–2000	Colón	38	(3)
2000–2001	Sporting Cristal		
2001–2003	Olimpia		
2004	Quilmes	12	(0)
2005	Belgrano		
- * Club domestic league appearances and goals

Fernando Gastón Córdoba (born 12 June 1974) is an Argentine former professional footballer who played as a midfielder.

Córdoba started his career at Estudiantes de La Plata at the age of 19 before moving to Racing Club where he helped the team reach the semifinal stage of the Copa Libertadores. He had a brief stint in Italian football by playing for Sampdoria in the 1998–99 season. Afterwards Córdoba played for Colón de Santa Fe, Sporting Cristal, Olimpia, Quilmes and Club Atlético Belgrano.

While playing for Olimpia he became a fan favorite after scoring a goal in the final of the 2002 Copa Libertadores which was eventually won by Olimpia.

== Honours ==
Olimpia

- Copa Libertadores: 2002
- Recopa Sudamericana: 2003
