= Danilo Aceval =

Paraguayan footballer (born 1975)

Personal information
- Full name: Danilo Vicente Aceval Maldonado
- Date of birth: 15 September 1975 (age 51)
- Place of birth: Arroyos y Esteros, Paraguay
- Height: 1.85 m (6 ft 1 in)
- Position: Goalkeeper

Senior career*
Years	Team	Apps	(Gls)
1994–1997	Cerro Porteño	46	(6)
1997–1999	Unión de Santa Fe	25	(0)
1999–2000	Cerro Porteño		
2000	San Lorenzo-PY	14	(0)
2000–2001	Tigres UANL	14	(0)
2001–2004	Olimpia	38	(0)
2004–2005	Cerro Porteño	26	(0)
2006	12 de Octubre	5	(0)
2007	Ñublense	26	(4)
Total		194	(10)

International career
1995–2005	Paraguay	11	(0)
- * Club domestic league appearances and goals

Danilo Vicente Aceval Maldonado (born 15 September 1975) is a retired Paraguayan football goalkeeper. He represented his native country at the 1998 FIFA World Cup.

== International ==
Aceval made his international debut for the Paraguay national football team on 14 May 1995 in a Copa Paz de Chico draw against Bolivia (1-1), substituting for Jorge Battaglia. He was selected to the Paraguayan for the 1998 FIFA World Cup.

Aceval obtained a total number of eleven international caps.
