= Serginho (footballer, born 1974) =

Brazilian footballer

- Serginho with São Caetano

Personal information
- Full name: Paulo Sérgio Oliveira da Silva
- Date of birth: 19 October 1974
- Place of birth: Vitória, Brazil
- Date of death: 27 October 2004 (aged 30)
- Place of death: São Paulo, Brazil
- Height: 1.82 m (6 ft 0 in)
- Position: Defender

Senior career*
Years	Team	Apps	(Gls)
1995	Patrocinense		
1995–1996	Social (MG)		
1996	Democrata-GV		
1996	Mogi Mirim		
1997–1998	Social (MG)		
1998	Ipatinga		
1999	Araçatuba		
1999–2004	São Caetano		
- * Club domestic league appearances and goals

Paulo Sérgio Oliveira da Silva (19 October 1974 – 27 October 2004), better known as Serginho, was a Brazilian footballer who played as a defender.

== Career ==
Serginho started his career in the town of Coronel Fabriciano, Minas Gerais state, Brazil. He played for São Caetano as a defender.

With São Caetano, Serginho won the 2nd division of Campeonato Paulista in 2000, and the first division in 2004, and was runner-up in two Campeonatos Brasileiros and one Copa Libertadores.

== Death ==
On 27 October 2004, Serginho collapsed during a Campeonato Brasileiro match between his team, São Caetano, and São Paulo, after suffering a fatal cardiac arrest around the 60th minute of play. After 15 minutes of resuscitation, he was rushed to Sao Luis Hospital, in Sao Paulo city. He was pronounced dead shortly after. A subsequent autopsy revealed that Serginho's heart weighed approximately 600 grams—about twice the size of an average adult male heart, a condition known as cardiomegaly.

Following an official investigation, São Caetano was found to have allowed Serginho to play despite prior knowledge of his heart condition, which had been identified during pre-season medical examinations. As a result, the club was penalized with a 24-point deduction. Despite this severe sanction, São Caetano managed to avoid relegation that season.

== See also ==
- Juan Izquierdo, who also died in the Morumbi
- List of association footballers who died while playing
