= Carlos Estigarribia =

Paraguayan footballer (born 1974)

Personal information
- Full name: Carlos Cecilio Estigarribia Raro
- Date of birth: 21 November 1975 (age 50)
- Place of birth: Luque, Paraguay
- Height: 1.80 m (5 ft 11 in)
- Position: Midfielder

Senior career*
Years	Team	Apps	(Gls)
1988	Fluminense		
1996–2003	Sportivo Luqueño	116	(20)
2000–2001	→ Independiente (loan)	4	(1)
2001–2004	Olimpia	45	(9)
2003	→ Guaraní	9	(2)
2004	12 de Octubre	4	(0)
2005	General Caballero (Zeballos Cue)	6	(0)
2006–2007	Rubio Ñu		

International career
1999	Paraguay MNT	4	(0)
- * Club domestic league appearances and goals

Carlos Cecilio Estigarribia Raro (born 21 November 1975) is a former Paraguayan footballer playing for clubs in Paraguay and Argentina, as well as for the Paraguay national football team in the 1999 Copa América Paraguay. He played as a midfielder. He was born in Luque, Paraguay.

== Teams ==
- (Brazil) Fluminense 1998
- (Paraguay) Sportivo Luqueño 1999–2000
- (Argentina) Independiente 2000–2001
- (Paraguay) Olimpia 2001–2002
- (Paraguay) Sportivo Luqueño 2003
- (Paraguay) Guaraní 2003
- (Paraguay) Olimpia 2004
- (Paraguay) 12 de Octubre 2004
- (Paraguay) General Caballero (Zeballos Cue) 2005
- (Paraguay) Rubio Ñu 2006–2007

== Titles ==
- (Paraguay) Olimpia 2002 (Copa Libertadores de América)
