= Sergio Órteman =

Uruguayan footballer (born 1978)

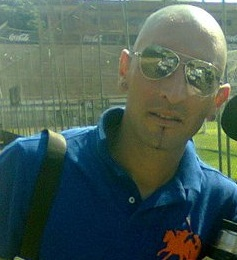

Personal information
- Full name: Sergio Daniel Órteman Rodríguez
- Date of birth: 29 September 1978 (age 48)
- Place of birth: Montevideo, Uruguay
- Height: 1.80 m (5 ft 11 in)
- Position: Midfielder

Senior career*
Years	Team	Apps	(Gls)
1997–2001	Central Español	14	(1)
2001–2004	Olimpia	65	(12)
2004–2005	Independiente	18	(1)
2005–2006	Club Atlas	15	(1)
2006	Independiente	17	(3)
2007	Boca Juniors	12	(1)
2007	Istanbul B.B.	9	(1)
2008	Racing Santander	5	(1)
2008	Grêmio	8	(1)
2009–2010	Peñarol	20	(0)
2010	Querétaro FC	14	(1)
2011–2012	Olimpia	41	(5)
2012–2013	Guaraní	36	(5)
2013	Olimpia	18	(1)
2014–2015	Peñarol	13	(1)
2015	Sportivo San Lorenzo	18	(1)

Managerial career
- 2016: Olimpia de Itá
- 2016: Capitán Figari
- 2017–2020: Sportivo San Lorenzo
- 2020–2021: Sol de América
- 2021: Olimpia
- 2022: 12 de Octubre
- 2023: Resistencia
- 2024: Aurora
- 2025–2026: Sportivo San Lorenzo
- * Club domestic league appearances and goals

Sergio Daniel Órteman Rodríguez (born 29 September 1978) is a Uruguayan football manager and former player who played as a midfielder.

== Career ==
Born in Montevideo, Órteman began his career in Uruguayan club Central Español in 1997. In 2001, he was transferred to Olimpia of Paraguay. A year later, Órteman was part of the Olimpia team that won the 2002 Copa Libertadores (being selected as the most valuable player of the tournament) and the 2003 Recopa Sudamericana.

Reflecting on being selected as the most valuable player, Orteman said “I was just thinking of hugging my teammates and partying with them. Today I am still proud of my teammates for helping me achieve the individual prize.”

He then moved to Independiente of Argentina in 2004, but had difficulties making the first team due to several injuries. For the 2005–06 season, Órteman went on loan to Mexican side Club Atlas. In July 2006, Órteman went back to Independiente. In 2007 Órteman joined Boca Juniors, and won the Copa Libertadores 2007 playing some minutes during the tournament. In the 2007–08 season, he played for Racing Santander, and has moved to Grêmio FBPA in July 2008.

On 17 February 2009, Órteman scored his only goal for Grêmio from Olimpico Monumental Stadium, before the goalkeeper Danrlei de Deus Hinterholz, who saved Brazil Pelotas from traditional Southern team where it is a city in Rio Grande do Sul State, with great care Roberson by Campeonato Gaúcho soccer.

On 21 August 2009, unhappy with his situation at Grêmio FBPA, he ended his contract with the club gaucho. Afterwards he moved to Uruguay to play for CA Peñarol.

On 28 May 2010, shortly after signing Sergio Blanco of Nacional Montevideo, the Mexican club Querétaro FC signed Órteman of Peñarol.

== Honours ==
Olimpia

- Copa Libertadores: 2002
- Recopa Sudamericana: 2003

Boca Juniors

- Copa Libertadores: 2007

Peñarol

- Primera División: 2009–10
