= Rodrigo López (footballer, born 1978) =

Uruguayan footballer

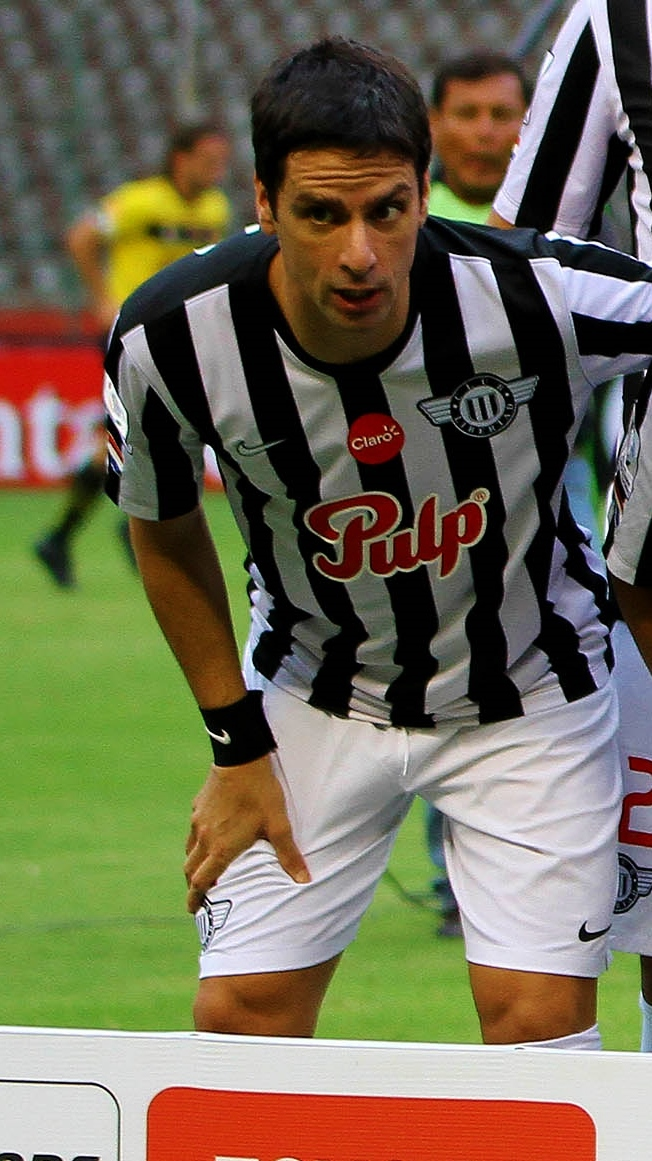
- López in 2015

Personal information
- Full name: Hernán Rodrigo López Mora
- Date of birth: 21 January 1978 (age 48)
- Place of birth: Montevideo, Uruguay
- Height: 1.81 m (5 ft 11 in)
- Position: Centre forward

Youth career
- River Plate Montevideo

Senior career*
Years	Team	Apps	(Gls)
1996–1998	River Plate Montevideo	57	(10)
1998	Torino	8	(0)
1998–1999	Kavala	4	(0)
1999–2000	River Plate Montevideo	14	(3)
2000	Colo-Colo	14	(1)
2001	Danubio	22	(4)
2002	Racing Montevideo	17	(10)
2002–2004	Olimpia	51	(12)
2004	Pachuca	11	(1)
2005–2007	Libertad	61	(39)
2007–2008	América	19	(8)
2009–2010	Vélez Sársfield	53	(23)
2010–2011	Estudiantes LP	19	(7)
2011–2012	Banfield	12	(4)
2012–2013	Cerro Porteño	15	(1)
2013	Sportivo Luqueño	18	(17)
2014–2016	Libertad	62	(35)
2016–2017	Guaraní	63	(17)

International career
1996–1997	Uruguay U20		
1996–2010	Uruguay	2	(0)

Managerial career
- 2018: Racing Montevideo
- 2020: Sportivo Luqueño
- 2020–2022: Nacional Asunción
- 2023: Guaraní
- 2026: Sportivo Luqueño
- * Club domestic league appearances and goals

Hernán Rodrigo López Mora (born 21 January 1978), also known as Rodrigo López, is an Uruguayan football manager and former player who played as a forward.

López is the second maximum goal scorer of Paraguayan football with 127 goals, behind Santiago Salcedo (152), and ahead of Juan Eduardo Samudio (119) and Fredy Bareiro (112).

== Club career ==
Born in Montevideo, López began his career with River Plate de Montevideo in Uruguay. He had short stints with Torino F.C. of Italy and Kavala of Greece in 1998 along with compatriot Pablo Gaglianone. In 2000, he joined Colo-Colo of Chile.

He returned to Uruguay in 2001 to play for Danubio FC and in 2002 he joined Racing Club de Montevideo

Between 2002 and 2004 he enjoyed a successful stint with Olimpia of Paraguay where he was part of the team that won both Copa Libertadores 2002 and Recopa Sudamericana 2003.

In 2004, he joined Mexican side Pachuca CF but after only a few games he returned to Paraguay to play for Libertad where he scored an impressive 39 goals in 71 league games, won the Primera División championship in 2006 and finished as the topscorer.

López returned to Mexican football in 2008 joining Club América where he played alongside a number of other South American players such as Federico Insúa of Argentina and Salvador Cabañas. He had a successful time with América, scoring a famous hat-trick against Tecos in the 2007 Apertura and helping the team to win the 2008 InterLiga.

In 2008, he joined Argentine Vélez Sársfield and had an unsuccessful start with the team, quickly reverted by contributing 11 goals in their championship season of Clausura 2009.

López was bought by Argentine side Estudiantes de La Plata in June 2010 for a fee of around US$750,000. He scored a number of vital goals for the club in his first season helping the club to win the Apertura 2010 tournament. He scored his first hat-trick for Estudiantes with three headers in a 5–1 win against Paraguayan side Guaraní in the group stages of the 2011 Copa Libertadores. In the following game he scored the winning goal against league leaders Racing Club.

In July 2011, he signed a two-year contract with Club Atlético Banfield.

One year later he returned to Paraguayan Football signing for Cerro Porteño. Then he was transferred to Sportivo Luqueño and now he is the main scorer of Libertad, being the topscorer at the 2014 Apertura, scoring 19 goals.

== International career ==
On the youth level, López was runner-up with Uruguay U-20 at the 1997 FIFA World Youth Championship. He even played the final against Argentina.

López played a friendly match for Uruguay against China in 1996. Thirteen years later, in 2009, he was called again by coach Oscar Washington Tabárez for a friendly match against Algeria and for the World Cup qualifying games against Peru and Colombia. He was also part of the squad that achieved the qualification by defeating Costa Rica on the playoff. However, he was not part of the Uruguayan squad that played the World Cup.

On 27 July 2010, he was called up to play a friendly match against Angola in Lisbon.

== Coaching career ==
Following the departure of Celso Ayala, López was appointed manager of Paraguayan club Sportivo Luqueño on 3 March 2020. After the club saw the departure of as many as 11 players to transfers and contract dissolutions mid-tournament, López decided to resign from his position on 7 September 2020, but agreed to coach his club for one last match, a come-from-behind 2–1 victory against River Plate on 11 September 2020. During his short tenure as head coach of Sportivo Luqueño, the team achieved 16 points in 12 matches (4W-4D-4L), climbing several positions in the table.

== Honours ==
=== Club ===
Olimpia

- Copa Libertadores (1): 2002
- Recopa Sudamericana (1): 2003

Libertad

- Paraguayan Primera División (2): 2006, 2014 Apertura

América

- InterLiga (1): 2008

Vélez Sársfield

- Argentine Primera División (1): 2009 Clausura

Estudiantes

- Argentine Primera División (1): 2010 Apertura

=== Individual ===
- Second maximum goal scorer of Paraguayan football with 127 goals
- Paraguayan Primera División top scorer: 2006 (27 goals, for Libertad)
- Paraguayan Primera División top scorer: 2013 Clausura (17 goals, for Sportivo Luqueño)
- Paraguayan Primera División top scorer: 2014 Apertura (19 goals, for Libertad)

== See also ==
- List of expatriate footballers in Paraguay
- Players and Records in Paraguayan Football
