= Néstor Isasi =

Paraguayan footballer (born 1972)

Personal information
- Full name: Néstor Daniel Isasi Guillén
- Date of birth: 9 April 1972 (age 54)
- Place of birth: Encarnación, Paraguay
- Height: 1.74 m (5 ft 9 in)
- Position: Right-back

Senior career*
Years	Team	Apps	(Gls)
1990–1992	Sport Colombia		
1992–1993	Nueva Estrella		
1994	Silvio Pettirossi		
1994–1997	Guaraní		
1997–1999	São Paulo	13	(0)
1998	→ América-MG (loan)	9	(0)
1999–2001	Guaraní		
2001–2003	Olimpia	60	(1)
2004	Cerro Porteño	18	(0)
2005	Nacional Asunción	24	(1)
2006–2007	Olimpia	11	(0)
2008	Deportes Antofagasta	0	(0)
2009	Alianza Lima		

International career
1995–2003	Paraguay	16	(1)
- * Club domestic league appearances and goals

Néstor Daniel Isasi Guillén (born 9 April 1972) is a Paraguayan former professional footballer who played as a right-back in clubs of Paraguay, Brazil, Chile and Peru. At international level, he made 16 appearances for the Paraguay national team scoring 1 goal.

== Career ==
Isasi mede his debut with Sport Colombia in his homeland. After, he played for Club Nueva Estrella and Silvio Pettirossi before signing with Guaraní in 1994.

After winning the 1996 league title with Guaraní, Isasi moved to Brazilian club São Paulo, also playing for America-MG in that country.

Back to Paraguay, Isasi had successful stints with Olimpia and Cerro Porteño.

He ended his career with Deportes Antofagasta in Chile and Alianza Lima in Peru.
