= Julio César Enciso (footballer, born 1974) =

Paraguayan footballer

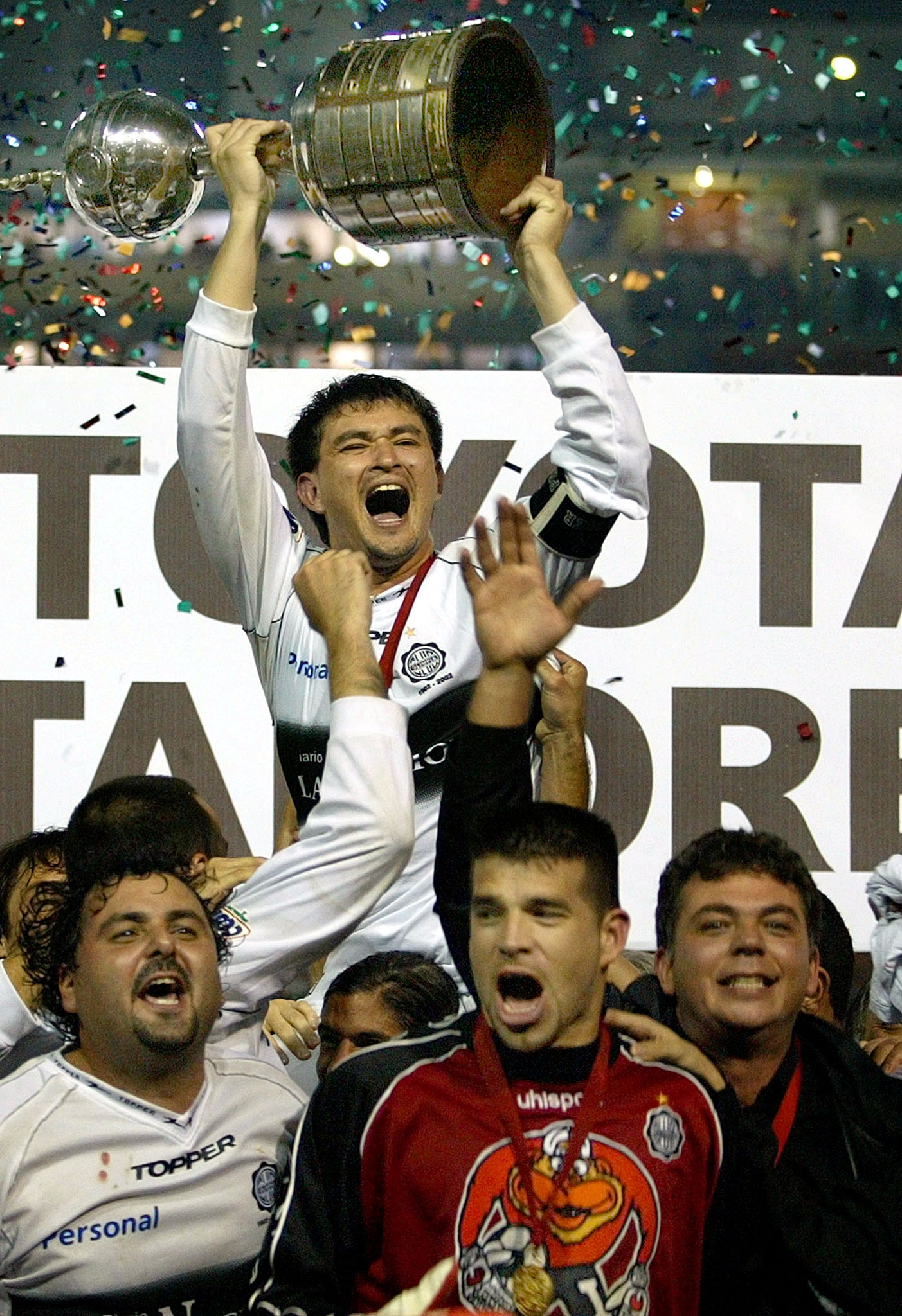
- Julio Enciso After Winning the Copa Libertadores Against Sao Caetano

Personal information
- Full name: Julio César Enciso Ferreira
- Date of birth: 5 August 1974 (age 52)
- Place of birth: Capiatá, Paraguay
- Height: 1.74 m (5 ft 9 in)
- Position: Midfielder

Senior career*
Years	Team	Apps	(Gls)
1994–1996	Cerro Porteño	58	(6)
1996–2000	Internacional	88	(1)
2001–2005	Olimpia Asunción	39	(3)
2006–2008	12 de Octubre	39	(2)

International career
2004	Paraguay U23		
1995–2004	Paraguay	70	(2)
- * Club domestic league appearances and goals as of April 2008

Olympic medal record

Men's Football
Silver medal – second place	2004 Athens	Team competition

Julio César Enciso Ferreira (born 5 August 1974 in Capiatá) is a Paraguayan association footballer who played as a midfielder. He made 70 appearances for the Paraguay national team between 1995 and 2004, scoring twice.

== Club career ==
Enciso started his playing career in 1994 with Cerro Porteño where he won the league championships in his debut season. In 1996, he was signed by Internacional of Brazil where he played for 5 seasons, winning the Campeonato Gaúcho in 1997.

Enciso returned to Paraguay in 2001 to play for Olimpia Asunción where he won the Copa Libertadores 2002 and the Recopa Sudamericana 2003. He left the club in 2005

His last club was 12 de Octubre where he spent the 2006 season and announced his retirement. However, for the 2008 Clausura tournament he was called by the coach, Saturnino Arrua, and decided to make a comeback to help the team get out of the relegation zone.

== International career ==
Enciso played for Paraguay at the 1998 World Cup. He missed out on his country's 2002 campaign. That same year he won the Copa Libertadores as a captain with Olimpia. Afterwards he was named an over-age player for the 2004 Olympics, where he helped Paraguay to a silver medal.

He also played for Paraguay in three editions of the Copa América in 1995, 1999 and 2001.

== Honours ==
=== Club ===
- Cerro Porteño
  - Paraguayan Primera División: 1994
- Internacional
  - Campeonato Gaúcho: 1997
- Olimpia
  - Copa Libertadores: 2002
  - Recopa Sudamericana: 2003

=== National team ===
- Paraguay
  - Summer Olympics: 2004 (Silver medal)
