= Richart Báez =

Paraguayan footballer (born 1973)

Personal information
- Full name: Richart Martín Báez Fernández
- Date of birth: 31 July 1973 (age 53)
- Place of birth: Asunción, Paraguay
- Height: 1.81 m (5 ft 11 in)
- Position: Striker

Senior career*
Years	Team	Apps	(Gls)
1994	Tembetary		
1995	Olimpia		
1996	Avispa Fukuoka	9	(3)
1997–1998	Universidad de Chile	18	(17)
1998–1999	América	24	(3)
1999–2000	Olimpia		
2000–2001	Atletico Celaya	10	(0)
2001–2003	Olimpia		
2004	12 Octubre	2	(0)
2004–2005	Municipal	3	(0)
2005	Sportivo Luqueño		

International career
1995–2002	Paraguay	26	(2)

Managerial career
- 2006: Martín Ledesma
- * Club domestic league appearances and goals

Richart Martín Báez Fernández (born 31 July 1973) is a Paraguayan former footballer who played as a striker.

== Career ==
Baez can be considered one of the most notable strikers in Olimpia's history. In 2002, he helped Olimpia conquer the Copa Libertadores de América scoring a crucial goal in the final. His best attribute was the scoring goals from crossing balls with his head. Baez was also known for having great charisma with the supporters and with the team. He represented Paraguay at the 2002 FIFA World Cup.

After he retired from playing, Báez became a football manager. He led Club Martín Ledesma during the 2006 season.

== Career statistics ==
=== Club ===
Club performance			League	
Season	Club	League	Apps	Goals
Paraguay			League	
1995	Olimpia	Primera División		
Japan			League	
1996	Avispa Fukuoka	J1 League	9	3
Chile			League	
1997	Universidad de Chile	Primera División	7	7
1998	Universidad de Chile	Primera División	11	10
Mexico			League	
1998/99	América	Primera División	24	3
Paraguay			League	
1999	Olimpia	Primera División		
2000	Olimpia	Primera División		
Mexico			League	
2000/01	Atlético Celaya	Primera División	10	0
Paraguay			League	
2001	Olimpia	Primera División		
2002	Olimpia	Primera División		
2003	Olimpia	Primera División		
2004	12 Octubre	Primera División		
Guatemala			League	
2004/05	Municipal	Liga Nacional	3	0
Paraguay			League	
2005	Sportivo Luqueño	Primera División		
Country	Paraguay			
Country	Japan		9	3
Country	Chile		18	17
Country	Mexico		34	3
Country	Guatemala		3	0
Total			64	23

=== International ===
Appearances and goals by national team and year
National team	Year	Apps	Goals
Paraguay	1995	8	1
Paraguay	1996	5	0
Paraguay	1997	6	1
Paraguay	1998	1	0
Paraguay	1999	1	0
Paraguay	2000	3	0
Paraguay	2001	–	
Paraguay	2002	2	0
Total		26	2

Scores and results list Paraguay's goal tally first, score column indicates score after each Báez goal.

List of international goals scored by Richart Báez
No.	Date	Venue	Opponent	Score	Result	Competition
1	14 June 1995	Estadio Gigante de Arroyito, Rosario, Argentina	Argentina	1–0	1–2	Friendly
2	20 August 1997	Atahualpa Olympic Stadium, Quito, Ecuador	Ecuador	1–0	1–2	1998 FIFA World Cup qualification

== Honours ==
=== Club ===
Universidad de Chile

- Primera División Chilena: Top Scorer 1997 Clausura (10 goals)
