= São Caetano Futebol =

Brazilian association football club based in São Caetano do Sul, São Paulo, Brazil

São Caetano
- Full name: Associação Desportiva São Caetano
- Nickname: Azulão (Big Blue One)
- Founded: 4 December 1989; 36 years ago
- Ground: Estádio Anacleto Campanella
- Capacity: 16,745
- President: Jorge Machado
- Head coach: Carlinhos Alves
- League: Campeonato Paulista Série A4
- 2025: Paulista Série A4, 7th of 16
| Home colors | Away colors |

São Caetano Futebol, formerly known as Associação Desportiva São Caetano, commonly referred to as São Caetano, is a Brazilian professional football club based in São Caetano do Sul, São Paulo. Founded on 4 December 1989, they compete in the Campeonato Paulista Série A4, the fourth tier of the São Paulo state football league and play their home games at Estádio Anacleto Campanella. Their biggest rival is Santo André.

The club's only major titles are winning the 2004 Campeonato Paulista and 2019 Copa Paulista, but the club is more well-known for their 2002 Copa Libertadores campaign, where they finished runner-up, and for their two runner-up finishes in the Serie A.

In November 2023, the club changed its name from Associação Desportiva São Caetano to São Caetano Futebol.

== History ==
Logo used until 2024

=== Early years ===
Founded in 1989, the club found success early, winning the Third and Second Divisions of São Paulo regional tournaments. In 1998, the club was runner up of the Serie C, and was promoted to Serie B.

=== Serie A era (2000–2006) ===
In 2000, the Brazilian national championship was contested in a rather unusual way. According to previous credentials, teams would play in the First, Second or Third Division; São Caetano played in the Second. The difference was that, after all Divisions were finished, a mini tournament would gather representatives from all of them (one team from Third Division, three from Second and twelve from First), and the winner would be the Brazilian Champion of 2000.

São Caetano was runner-up of the Second Division and qualified to the finals. Beating Fluminense, Palmeiras and Grêmio, they entered the final against Vasco da Gama. The first match ended as a draw. Halfway during the second match, a fence collapsed at Estádio São Januário and the match was suspended. Despite several claims that São Caetano should be declared champion, Vasco petitioned the league for a third match, which Vasco went on to win 3-1. Their runner-up finish gave them qualification for the 2001 Copa Libertadores.

Unlike many teams that rise prominently then quickly fall back to obscurity, São Caetano had another strong campaign in 2001. Playing its first full season in the top division, they topped the table in the first stage, and then reached the finals against Atlético Paranaense. Once again they finished as the runner-up, but consecutive seasons placing well secured their reputation on a national level. In the 2001 Copa Libertadores, Azulao reached the round of 16, being eliminated by Palmeiras on penalties.

Sao Caetano had an excellent campaign in the 2002 Copa Libertadores. They began their campaign by topping their group, with four wins and two losses. In the round of 16 they eliminated U. Católica on penalties, setting up a quarter-final matchup with five-time Libertadores champion Peñarol, which they also beat on penalties. In the semi-finals, they faced Club América, and beat them 3-1 on aggregate to advance to the finals against two-time champion Club Olimpia. On 24 July, Sao Caetano won the first leg in Asuncion 1-0, but in the second leg at Pacaembu Stadium Olimpia won 2-1 and sent the game into a penalty shootout. Olimpia won the shootout 4-2, causing Sao Caetano to finish runner-up for the third consecutive time. Despite finishing runner up, Sao Caetano earned respect, and their run to the Libertadores final was seen as an extreme fairytale story. In the 2002 Serie A, Sao Caetano had a good campaign as well, finishing second in the regular season before being eliminated by Fluminense in the quarter-finals.

The following season, Sao Caetano finished fourth in the league, and qualified for the 2004 Copa Libertadores; In the Libertadores the club eliminated Club America again in the round of 16 before narrowly being knocked out by eventual champions Boca Juniors on penalties in the quarter finals. Also that year, São Caetano won their first title, the Campeonato Paulista, being Paulista from Jundiaí.

On 27 October 2004, while playing in a match against São Paulo, São Caetano defender Serginho suffered a fatal heart attack. As São Caetano's staff let Serginho play despite knowing that he had heart problems, the club was penalized heavily by the CBF, which has since marked a decline in their performance, and caused them to be deducted 24 points in the 2004 Serie A.

The club performed poorly in the 2005 Serie A, finishing seventeenth and just two points off the relegation zone. At the end of the 2006 season, they finished within the relegation zone, and were relegated to the 2007 Serie B.

=== Decline (2007–) ===
In the next few seasons, the club finished in the middle of the Serie B table. In the 2012 Série B, the club had a good season, finishing fifth and only missing out on promotion to the Serie A on goal difference (top four were promoted). However, the 2013 season was the complete opposite; even with the signing of Brazil legend Rivaldo, the club had a poor season and was relegated to Série C after 14 years in the top two divisions of Brazil, and just 10 years after being in the Copa Libertadores finals. In the same year, the team was relegated in the São Paulo state championship, relegated to the Paulista Serie A2. In 2014, the team would begin the season with lackluster performance in the 2nd level of the state championship, in which the team only escaped relegation in the last round. Following a subpar season in the 2014 Série C, the team suffered back to back relegations and found itself in the Série D.

After an unsuccessful campaign in the Serie D, the club would play only in the state leagues. However, after finishing the 2018 Campeonato Paulista in 7th place, they qualified for the 2019 Serie D. However, since 2019 the club has been in an absolute free fall, suffering three further relegations and playing in the Campeonato Paulista Série A4 as of 2024.

== Stadium ==
Built in 1955, São Caetano's stadium is Estádio Anacleto Campanella. Its capacity is 22,738 people. However, for Copa Libertadores matches, the club used Pacaembu Stadium because their main stadium did not meet CONMEBOL's requirements.

== Notable players ==
Below is a list of notable players of São Caetano:

- Adãozinho
- Adhemar
- Aílton
- Anaílson
- Ânderson Lima
- Brandão
- César
- Claudecir
- Daniel
- Dininho
- Douglas
- Éder
- Esquerdinha
- Euller
- Fábio Santos
- Glaydson
- Japinha
- Luís Pereira
- Luiz
- Luiz Henrique
- Magrão (forward)
- Magrão (midfielder)
- Marcelo Mattos
- Marcinho
- Marcos Senna
- Mineiro
- Robert
- Russo
- Serginho
- Serginho Chulapa
- Silvio Luiz
- Somália
- Triguinho
- Túlio Maravilha

== Former coaches ==
- Márcio Goiano
- Ademir Fonseca
- Toninho Cecílio
- Sérgio Guedes
- Antônio Carlos Zago
- Guilherme Macuglia
- Pintado
- Sérgio Soares
- Vadão
- Giba
- Paulo Comelli
- Dorival Júnior
- Levir Culpi
- Estevam Soares
- Muricy Ramalho
- Jair Picerni
- Márcio Araújo
- Émerson Leão

== Honours ==
=== Official tournaments ===
State
| Competitions | Titles | Seasons |
|---|---|---|
| Campeonato Paulista | 1 | 2004 |
| Copa Paulista | 1 | 2019 |
| Campeonato Paulista Série A2 | 3 | 2000, 2017, 2020 |
| Campeonato Paulista Série A3 | 2 | 1991, 1998 |

=== Runners-up ===
- Copa Libertadores (1): 2002
- Campeonato Brasileiro Série A (2): 2000, 2001
- Copa João Havelange Yellow Group (1): 2000
- Campeonato Brasileiro Série C (1): 1998
- Campeonato Paulista (1): 2007
- Campeonato Paulista Série A2 (1): 1992
