= 2002 Copa Libertadores =

43rd season of Copa Libertadores

2002 Copa Libertadores de América
2002 Copa Toyota Libertadores de América

Tournament details
- Dates: 5 February – 31 July
- Teams: 32 (from 11 associations)

Final positions
- Champions: (Paraguay) Olimpia (3rd title)
- Runners-up: (Brazil) São Caetano

Tournament statistics
- Matches played: 126
- Goals scored: 347 (2.75 per match)
- Top scorer: (Brazil) Rodrigo Mendes (10 goals)

The 2002 Copa Libertadores de América was the 43rd edition of CONMEBOL's premier club football tournament. It was won by the Paraguayan club Olimpia; their third title.

== First round ==
The first round of the Copa Libertadores drew 32 teams into eight groups of four; two of these teams came from the preliminary round. In each group, teams played against each other home-and-away. The top two in each group advanced to the second round.

Real Potosí, Talleres, Tuluá, 12 de Octubre and Monarcas Morelia made their debuts in this tournament.

=== Group 1 ===
Pos	Team	Pld	W	D	L	GF	GA	GD	Pts	SÃO	COB	CER	ALI
1	(Brazil) São Caetano	6	4	0	2	14	4	+10	12		3–0	0–1	4–0
2	(Chile) Cobreloa	6	4	0	2	12	8	+4	12	2–1		3–0	5–0
3	(Paraguay) Cerro Porteño	6	3	1	2	7	6	+1	10	1–3	3–0		2–0
4	(Peru) Alianza Lima	6	0	1	5	1	16	−15	1	0–3	1–2	0–0	

Legend: Blue = home team win; Yellow = draw; Red = away team win.

=== Group 2 ===
Pos	Team	Pld	W	D	L	GF	GA	GD	Pts	GRE	CIE	OCT	ORI
1	(Brazil) Grêmio	6	4	0	2	11	7	+4	12		2–0	1–0	3–2
2	(Peru) Cienciano	6	3	0	3	8	7	+1	9	2–1		3–0	2–0
3	(Paraguay) 12 de Octubre	6	3	0	3	5	7	−2	9	1–0	1–0		3–2
4	(Bolivia) Oriente Petrolero	6	2	0	4	10	13	−3	6	2–4	3–1	1–0	

Legend: Blue = home team win; Yellow = draw; Red = away team win.

=== Group 3 ===
Pos	Team	Pld	W	D	L	GF	GA	GD	Pts	PEÑ	NAC	SLA	REA
1	(Uruguay) Peñarol	6	4	0	2	11	7	+4	12		3–0	1–0	4–0
2	(Ecuador) El Nacional	6	4	0	2	10	6	+4	12	1–0		3–0	2–0
3	(Argentina) San Lorenzo	6	2	0	4	6	8	−2	6	0–2	1–0		5–1
4	(Bolivia) Real Potosí	6	2	0	4	10	16	−6	6	6–1	2–4	1–0	

Legend: Blue = home team win; Yellow = draw; Red = away team win.

=== Group 4 ===
Pos	Team	Pld	W	D	L	GF	GA	GD	Pts	AME	OLM	BOL	PAR
1	(Colombia) América de Cali	6	3	2	1	10	3	+7	11		1–0	2–0	5–0
2	(Ecuador) Olmedo	6	3	0	3	7	7	0	9	1–0		4–1	2–1
3	(Bolivia) Bolívar	6	2	2	2	11	13	−2	8	1–1	2–0		5–5
4	(Brazil) Atlético Paranaense	6	1	2	3	10	15	−5	5	1–1	2–0	1–2	

Legend: Blue = home team win; Yellow = draw; Red = away team win.

=== Group 5 ===
Pos	Team	Pld	W	D	L	GF	GA	GD	Pts	MOR	NAC	VEL	SC
1	(Mexico) Morelia	6	4	2	0	15	7	+8	14		4–2	0–0	4–0
2	(Uruguay) Nacional	6	3	2	1	13	12	+1	11	3–3		2–2	1–0
3	(Argentina) Vélez Sársfield	6	2	2	2	8	8	0	8	2–3	0–1		1–0
4	(Peru) Sporting Cristal	6	0	0	6	5	14	−9	0	0–1	3–4	2–3	

Legend: Blue = home team win; Yellow = draw; Red = away team win.

=== Group 6 ===
Pos	Team	Pld	W	D	L	GF	GA	GD	Pts	BOC	MON	SAN	EME
1	(Argentina) Boca Juniors	6	4	1	1	7	2	+5	13		2–0	0–0	1–0
2	(Uruguay) Montevideo Wanderers	6	3	1	2	8	7	+1	10	0–2		3–1	3–1
3	(Chile) Santiago Wanderers	6	2	3	1	6	6	0	9	1–0	1–1		2–1
4	(Ecuador) Emelec	6	0	1	5	4	10	−6	1	1–2	0–1	1–1	

Legend: Blue = home team win; Yellow = draw; Red = away team win.

=== Group 7 ===
Pos	Team	Pld	W	D	L	GF	GA	GD	Pts	AME	RIV	TAL	TUL
1	(Mexico) América	6	5	1	0	9	2	+7	16		0–0	2–0	3–2
2	(Argentina) River Plate	6	2	3	1	8	4	+4	9	0–1		0–0	2–0
3	(Argentina) Talleres	6	1	2	3	5	9	−4	5	0–1	1–1		2–1
4	(Colombia) Tuluá	6	1	0	5	9	16	−7	3	0–2	2–5	4–2	

Legend: Blue = home team win; Yellow = draw; Red = away team win.

=== Group 8 ===
Pos	Team	Pld	W	D	L	GF	GA	GD	Pts	OLI	UCA	ONC	FLA
1	(Paraguay) Olimpia	6	3	2	1	8	5	+3	11		1–1	3–2	2–0
2	(Chile) Universidad Católica	6	3	1	2	9	8	+1	10	0–1		3–1	2–1
3	(Colombia) Once Caldas	6	3	0	3	10	11	−1	9	2–1	3–0		1–0
4	(Brazil) Flamengo	6	1	1	4	6	9	−3	4	0–0	1–3	4–1	

Legend: Blue = home team win; Yellow = draw; Red = away team win.

== Second round ==
=== Bracket ===
Round of 16
(Ecuador) El Nacional	0	0	0
(Argentina) Boca Juniors	0	2	2
(Chile) Cobreloa	0	1	1
(Paraguay) Olimpia	2	2	4
(Argentina) River Plate	1	0	1
(Brazil) Grêmio	2	4	6
(Uruguay) Nacional	1	0	1
(Colombia) América	0	0	0
(Uruguay) Montevideo Wanderers	2	2	4 (0)
(Uruguay) Peñarol (p)	2	2	4 (3)
(Chile) Universidad Católica	1	1	2 (2)
(Brazil) São Caetano (p)	1	1	2 (4)
(Ecuador) Olmedo	0	2	2
(Mexico) Morelia	5	3	8
(Peru) Cienciano	0	1	1
(Mexico) América	1	4	5

Quarterfinals
(Argentina) Boca Juniors	1	0	1
(Paraguay) Olimpia	1	1	2
(Brazil) Grêmio	1	1	2
(Uruguay) Nacional	0	1	1
(Uruguay) Peñarol	1	1	2 (1)
(Brazil) São Caetano (p)	0	2	2 (3)
(Mexico) Morelia	1	1	2
(Mexico) América	2	2	4

Semifinals
(Paraguay) Olimpia (p)	3	0	3 (5)
(Brazil) Grêmio	2	1	3 (4)
(Brazil) São Caetano	2	1	3
(Mexico) América	0	1	1

Finals
(Paraguay) Olimpia (p)	0	2	2 (4)
(Brazil) São Caetano	1	1	2 (2)

=== Round of 16 ===
Team 1	Agg.	Team 2	1st leg	2nd leg
Olimpia (Paraguay)	4–1	(Chile) Cobreloa	2–0	2–1
Universidad Católica (Chile)	2–2 (2–4 p)	(Brazil) São Caetano	1–1	1–1
River Plate (Argentina)	1–6	(Brazil) Grêmio	1–2	0–4
Montevideo Wanderers (Uruguay)	4–4 (0–3 p)	(Uruguay) Peñarol	2–2	2–2
Nacional (Uruguay)	1–0	(Colombia) América	1–0	0–0
Olmedo (Ecuador)	2–8	(Mexico) Morelia	0–5	2–3
El Nacional (Ecuador)	0–2	(Argentina) Boca Juniors	0–0	0–2
Cienciano (Peru)	1–5	(Mexico) América	0–1	1–4

- The first leg match between Olimpia and Cobreloa played in Calama was suspended at the end of the first half due to crowd interference; a coin was thrown at the referee Ángel Sánchez and sustained an injury. At half-time the result was 1–1, but CONMEBOL awarded Olimpia a 2–0 victory and closed Cobreloa's stadium for a period of time.

== Quarterfinals ==
Team 1	Agg.	Team 2	1st leg	2nd leg
Peñarol (Uruguay)	2–2 (1–3 p)	(Brazil) São Caetano	1–0	1–2
Grêmio (Brazil)	2–1	(Uruguay) Nacional	1–0	1–1
Morelia (Mexico)	2–4	(Mexico) América	1–2	1–2
Olimpia (Paraguay)	2–1	(Argentina) Boca Juniors	1–1	1–0

== Semifinals ==
Team 1	Agg.	Team 2	1st leg	2nd leg
São Caetano (Brazil)	3–1	(Mexico) América	2–0	1–1
Olimpia (Paraguay)	3–3 (5–4 p)	(Brazil) Grêmio	3–2	0–1

== Finals ==
24 July 2002
21:45 (UTC-3)

Olimpia (Paraguay)	0–1	(Brazil) São Caetano
	(Report)	Ailton 61'

Estadio Defensores del Chaco, Asunción
Referee: Horacio Elizondo (Argentina)

31 July 2002
21:45 (UTC-3)

São Caetano (Brazil)	1–2	(Paraguay) Olimpia
Ailton 31'	(Report)	Córdoba 49'; Báez 59'
Penalties
Adãozinho (penalty scored); Marcos Senna (penalty scored); Marlon (penalty missed); Serginho (penalty missed)	2–4	(penalty scored) Enciso; (penalty scored) Órteman; (penalty scored) López; (penalty scored) Caballero

Estádio do Pacaembu, São Paulo
Attendance: 32,000
Referee: Óscar Ruiz (Colombia)

Copa Libertadores de América
2002 champion

Third title
