= Paraguay at the FIFA World Cup =

International football delegation

The FIFA World Cup is an international association football competition contested by the men's national teams of the members of Fédération Internationale de Football Association (FIFA), the sport's global governing body. The championship has been awarded every four years since the first tournament in 1930, except in 1942 and 1946, due to World War II.

Paraguay have appeared in the finals of the World Cup on nine occasions, the first being at the very first finals in 1930, where they finished in the ninth position. Their farthest advancement in the tournament was in 2010, when they reached the quarter-finals for the first time. They made a ninth World Cup appearance at the 2026 tournament.

== Overall record ==
FIFA World Cup record
Year	Round	Position	Pld	W	D*	L	GF	GA
(Uruguay) 1930	Group stage	9th	2	1	0	1	1	3
(Italy) 1934	Did not enter							
(France) 1938	Did not enter							
(Brazil) 1950	Group stage	11th	2	0	1	1	2	4
(Switzerland) 1954	Did not qualify							
(Sweden) 1958	Group stage	12th	3	1	1	1	9	12
(Chile) 1962	Did not qualify							
(England) 1966	Did not qualify							
(Mexico) 1970	Did not qualify							
(West Germany) 1974	Did not qualify							
(Argentina) 1978	Did not qualify							
(Spain) 1982	Did not qualify							
(Mexico) 1986	Round of 16	13th	4	1	2	1	4	6
(Italy) 1990	Did not qualify							
(United States) 1994	Did not qualify							
(France) 1998	Round of 16	14th	4	1	2	1	3	2
(South Korea) (Japan) 2002	Round of 16	16th	4	1	1	2	6	7
(Germany) 2006	Group stage	18th	3	1	0	2	2	2
(South Africa) 2010	Quarter-finals	8th	5	1	3	1	3	2
(Brazil) 2014	Did not qualify							
(Russia) 2018	Did not qualify							
(Qatar) 2022	Did not qualify							
(Canada) (Mexico) (United States) 2026	Round of 16	16th	5	1	2	2	3	6
(Morocco) (Portugal) (Spain) 2030	Qualified as centenary co-host							
(Saudi Arabia) 2034	To be determined							
Total	Quarter-finals	9/23	32	8	12	12	33	44

*Denotes draws including knockout matches decided via penalty shoot-out.

=== By match ===
World Cup	Round	Opponent	Score	Result	Venue	Paraguay scorers
1930	Group 4	United States	0–3	L	Montevideo	—
1930	Group 4	Belgium	1–0	W	Montevideo	L. Peña
1950	Group 3	Sweden	2–2	D	Curitiba	A. López, C. López Fretes
1950	Group 3	Italy	0–2	L	São Paulo	—
1958	Group 2	France	3–7	L	Norrköping	F. Amarilla (2), J. Romero
1958	Group 2	Scotland	3–2	W	Norrköping	J. Agüero, C. Ré, J. Parodi
1958	Group 2	Yugoslavia	3–3	D	Eskilstuna	J. Parodi, J. Agüero, J. Romero
1986	Group B	Iraq	1–0	W	Toluca	Romerito
1986	Group B	Mexico	1–1	D	Mexico City	Romerito
1986	Group B	Belgium	2–2	D	Toluca	R. Cabañas (2)
1986	Round of 16	England	0–3	L	Mexico City	—
1998	Group D	Bulgaria	0–0	D	Montpellier	—
1998	Group D	Spain	0–0	D	Saint-Étienne	—
1998	Group D	Nigeria	3–1	W	Toulouse	C. Ayala, M. Benítez, J. Cardozo
1998	Round of 16	France	0–1 (g.g.)	L	Lens	—
2002	Group B	South Africa	2–2	D	Busan	R. Santa Cruz, F. Arce
2002	Group B	Spain	1–3	L	Jeonju	C. Puyol (o.g.)
2002	Group B	Slovenia	3–1	W	Seogwipo	N. Cuevas (2), J. Campos
2002	Round of 16	Germany	0–1	L	Seogwipo	—
2006	Group B	England	0–1	L	Frankfurt	—
2006	Group B	Sweden	0–1	L	Berlin	—
2006	Group B	Trinidad and Tobago	2–0	W	Kaiserslautern	B. Sancho (o.g.), N. Cuevas
2010	Group F	Italy	1–1	D	Cape Town	A. Alcaraz
2010	Group F	Slovakia	2–0	W	Bloemfontein	E. Vera, C. Riveros
2010	Group F	New Zealand	0–0	D	Polokwane	—
2010	Round of 16	Japan	0–0 (a.e.t.) (5–3 p)	D	Pretoria	—
2010	Quarter-finals	Spain	0–1	L	Johannesburg	—
2026	Group D	United States	1–4	L	Inglewood	Maurício
2026	Group D	Turkey	1–0	W	Santa Clara	M. Galarza
2026	Group D	Australia	0–0	D	Santa Clara	—
2026	Round of 32	Germany	1–1 (a.e.t.) (4–3 p)	D	Foxborough	J. Enciso
2026	Round of 16	France	0–1	L	Philadelphia	—
2030	TBA	TBA	TBA	TBA	TBA	
2030	TBA	TBA	TBA	TBA	TBA	
2030	TBA	TBA	TBA	TBA	TBA	

=== Record by opponent ===
FIFA World Cup matches (by team)
Opponent	Wins	Draws	Losses	Total	Goals Scored	Goals Conceded
Australia	0	1	0	0	0	0
Belgium	1	1	0	2	3	2
Bulgaria	0	1	0	1	0	0
England	0	0	2	2	0	4
France	0	0	3	3	3	9
Germany	0	1	1	2	1	2
Iraq	1	0	0	1	1	0
Italy	0	1	1	2	1	3
Japan	0	1	0	1	0	0
Mexico	0	1	0	1	1	1
New Zealand	0	1	0	1	0	0
Nigeria	1	0	0	1	3	1
Scotland	1	0	0	1	3	2
Slovakia	1	0	0	1	2	0
Slovenia	1	0	0	1	3	1
South Africa	0	1	0	1	2	2
Spain	0	1	2	3	1	4
Sweden	0	1	1	2	2	3
Trinidad and Tobago	1	0	0	1	2	0
Turkey	1	0	0	1	1	0
United States	0	0	2	2	1	7
Yugoslavia	0	1	0	1	3	3

== Tournament summary ==
Paraguay competed at three World Cups by 1958, and after a long gap they re-appeared in 1986. Later, they achieved a streak of four participations: South Africa 2010 was Paraguay's fourth consecutive trip to the World Cup final tournament, having previously qualified for the final in 1998, 2002 and 2006. After a poor qualifying campaign, however, Paraguay failed to qualify for the tournament in 2014, missing out on the chance to play in a World Cup hosted on their own continent, in Brazil. Three times they survived the first round of the international football tournament, with the highlight being in 2010 where they reached the quarter-finals.

=== 1930 FIFA World Cup ===
17 July 1930 (first round)
14:45 UYT (UTC−03:30)

United States	3–0	Paraguay
Patenaude 10', 15', 50'	Report

Estadio Parque Central, Montevideo
Attendance: 800
Referee: José Macías (Argentina)

UNITED STATES:
GK	1	Jimmy Douglas
DF	2	Alexander Wood
MF	3	Andy Auld
FW	4	Bart McGhee
FW	5	Bert Patenaude
MF	6	Billy Gonsalves
DF	7	George Moorhouse
MF	8	Jim Brown
DF	9	Jimmy Gallagher
DF	10	Raphael Tracey
FW	11	Tom Florie (c)
Manager:
Robert Millar

PARAGUAY:
GK	1	Modesto Denis
FW	2	Aurelio González
FW	3	Delfín Benítez Cáceres
FW	4	Diógenes Domínguez
MF	5	Eusebio Díaz
MF	6	Francisco Aguirre
DF	7	José Miracca
FW	8	Lino Nessi
FW	9	Luis Vargas Peña (c)
DF	10	Quiterio Olmedo
MF	11	Romildo Etcheverry
Manager:
(Argentina) José Durand Laguna

Linesmen:
Martin Aphesteguy (Uruguay)
Anibal Tejada (Uruguay)

20 July 1930 (first round)
15:00 UYT (UTC−03:30)

Paraguay	1–0	Belgium
Vargas Peña 40'	Report

Estadio Centenario, Montevideo
Attendance: 900
Referee: Ricardo Vallarino (Uruguay)

PARAGUAY:
GK	1	Pedro Benítez
FW	2	Aurelio González
FW	3	Delfín Benítez Cáceres
MF	4	Eusebio Díaz
FW	5	Gerardo Romero
FW	6	Lino Nessi
FW	7	Luis Vargas Peña (c)
DF	8	Quiterio Olmedo
DF	9	Salvador Flores
MF	10	Santiago Benítez
MF	11	Tranquilino Garcete
Manager:
(Argentina) José Durand Laguna

BELGIUM:
GK	1	Arnold Badjou
MF	2	August Hellemans
FW	3	Ferdinand Adams
FW	4	Gérard Delbeke
DF	5	Henri De Deken
FW	6	Jacques Moeschal
FW	7	Jan Diddens
FW	8	Louis Versyp
DF	9	Nic Hoydonckx
MF	10	Pierre Braine (c)
DF	11	Theodore Nouwens
Manager:
Hector Goetinck

Linesmen:
José Macías (Argentina)
Domingo Lombardi (Uruguay)

=== 1950 FIFA World Cup ===
In their return to the World Cup, Paraguay faced Sweden and Italy in Group 3. Paraguay failed to advance to the next round after a 2–2 draw against Sweden and a 2–0 loss against Italy.

Pos	Team	Pld	W	D	L	GF	GA	GD	Pts	Qualification
1	Sweden	2	1	1	0	5	4	+1	3	Advance to final round
2	Italy	2	1	0	1	4	3	+1	2	
3	Paraguay	2	0	1	1	2	4	−2	1	
4	India	0	0	0	0	0	0	0	0	Withdrew

Source: FIFA
Rules for classification: Tiebreakers
29 June 1950
15:30 BRT (UTC-03)

Sweden	2 – 2	Paraguay
Sundqvist 17'; Palmér 26'	Report	López 35'; López Fretes 74'

Estádio Durival Britto, Curitiba
Attendance: 8,000
Referee: Robert Mitchell (Scotland)

2 July 1950
15:00 BRT (UTC-03)

Italy	2 – 0	Paraguay
Carapellese 12'; Pandolfini 62'	Report

Estádio do Pacaembu, São Paulo
Attendance: 26,000
Referee: Arthur Ellis (England)

=== 1958 FIFA World Cup ===
For the 1958 World Cup, Paraguay surprisingly qualified ahead of Uruguay (beating them 5–0 in the decisive game) with a team that contained a formidable attacking lineup with stars such as Juan Bautista Agüero, José Parodi, Juan Romero, Cayetano Ré and Florencio Amarilla. In their first game in Sweden, Paraguay were 3–2 up against France in a game they lost 7–3. A 3–2 win over Scotland and a 3–3 draw with Yugoslavia saw Paraguay finish third in their group.

Pos	Team	Pld	W	D	L	GF	GA	GR	Pts	Qualification
1	France	3	2	0	1	11	7	1.571	4 (Note: France finished ahead of Yugoslavia on goal average.)	Advance to knockout stage
2	Yugoslavia	3	1	2	0	7	6	1.167	4	Advance to knockout stage
3	Paraguay	3	1	1	1	9	12	0.750	3	
4	Scotland	3	0	1	2	4	6	0.667	1	

Source: FIFA
Notes:
8 June 1958
19:00 (CET)

France	7–3	Paraguay
Fontaine 24', 30', 67'; Piantoni 52'; Wisnieski 61'; Kopa 70'; Vincent 83'	Report	Amarilla 20', 44' (pen.); Romero 50'

Idrottsparken, Norrköping
Attendance: 16,500
Referee: Gardeazabal (Spain)

11 June 1958
19:00 (CET)

Paraguay	3–2	Scotland
Agüero 4'; Ré 45'; Parodi 73'	Report	Mudie 24'; Collins 74'

Idrottsparken, Norrköping
Attendance: 12,000
Referee: Orlandini (Italy)

15 June 1958
19:00 (CET)

Paraguay	3–3	Yugoslavia
Parodi 20'; Agüero 52'; Romero 80'	Report	Ognjanović 18'; Veselinović 21'; Rajkov 73'

Tunavallen, Eskilstuna
Attendance: 12,000
Referee: Macko (Czechoslovakia)

=== 1986 FIFA World Cup ===
Paraguay ended a 28-year absence from the World Cup in 1986 with a team starring Roberto Fernández in goal; Cesar Zabala, Rogelio Delgado and Juan Bautista Torales in defense; Jorge Amado Nunes and Vladimiro Schettina in midfield; midfield playmaker Romerito and strikers Roberto Cabañas, Ramón Hicks and Rolando Chilavert (older brother of José Luis Chilavert). In first round matches, Paraguay defeated Iraq (1–0, goal Romerito) and then tied Mexico (1–1, goal Romerito) and Belgium (2–2, both goals Roberto Cabañas). They reached the second round where they were beaten 3–0 by England.

Pos	Team	Pld	W	D	L	GF	GA	GD	Pts	Qualification
1	Mexico (H)	3	2	1	0	4	2	+2	5	Advance to knockout stage
2	Paraguay	3	1	2	0	4	3	+1	4	Advance to knockout stage
3	Belgium	3	1	1	1	5	5	0	3	Advance to knockout stage
4	Iraq	3	0	0	3	1	4	−3	0	

Source: FIFA
(H) Hosts
4 June 1986 (first round)
12:00 CST

Paraguay	1–0	Iraq
Romerito 35'	Report

Estadio Nemesio Díez, Toluca
Attendance: 24,000
Referee: Edwin Picon-Ackong (Mauritius)

PARAGUAY:
GK	1	Roberto Fernández
DF	2	Juan Torales
DF	3	César Zabala
DF	4	Vladimiro Schettina	(yellow card) 45'
DF	5	Rogelio Delgado (c)
MF	6	Jorge Amado Nunes
MF	10	Adolfino Cañete
MF	8	Romerito
FW	7	Buenaventura Ferreira
FW	11	Alfredo Mendoza		(substituted off) 88'
FW	9	Roberto Cabañas
Substitutions:
MF	16	Jorge Guasch		(substituted on) 88'
Manager:
(Paraguay) Cayetano Ré

IRAQ:
GK	1	Raad Hammoudi Salman (c)
DF	3	Khalil Mohammed Allawi
DF	4	Nadhim Shaker Salim
DF	5	Samir Shaker Mahmoud	(yellow card) 29'
DF	15	Natiq Hashim Abidoun
DF	22	Ghanim Oraibi Jassim
MF	6	Ali Hussein Shihab
MF	7	Haris Mohammed Hassan		(substituted off) 67'
MF	14	Basil Gorgis Hanna		(substituted off) 81'
FW	10	Hussein Saeed Mohammed
FW	8	Ahmad Radhi Amaiesh
Substitutions:
FW	11	Abdul-Rahim Hamed Aufi		(substituted on) 67'
MF	19	Basim Qasim Hamdan		(substituted on) 81'
Manager:
(Brazil) Evaristo de Macedo

7 June 1986 (first round)
12:00 CST

Mexico	1–1	Paraguay
Flores 3'	Report	Romerito 85'

Estadio Azteca, Mexico City
Attendance: 114,600
Referee: George Courtney (England)

MEXICO:
GK	1	Pablo Larios
DF	2	Mario Trejo	(yellow card) 80'
DF	3	Fernando Quirarte
DF	14	Félix Cruz
DF	17	Raúl Servín
MF	16	Carlos Muñoz
MF	10	Tomás Boy (c)		(substituted off) 58'
MF	13	Javier Aguirre
FW	22	Manuel Negrete	(yellow card) 26'
FW	15	Luis Flores		(substituted off) 77'
FW	9	Hugo Sánchez	(yellow card) 75'
Substitutions:
MF	7	Miguel España		(substituted on) 58'
FW	5	Francisco Javier Cruz		(substituted on) 77'
Manager:
(Socialist Federal Republic of Yugoslavia) Bora Milutinović

PARAGUAY:
GK	1	Roberto Fernández
DF	2	Juan Torales		(substituted off) 80'
DF	3	César Zabala
DF	4	Vladimiro Schettina	(yellow card) 30'
DF	5	Rogelio Delgado (c)
MF	6	Jorge Amado Nunes
MF	10	Adolfino Cañete
MF	8	Romerito
FW	7	Buenaventura Ferreira
FW	11	Alfredo Mendoza	(yellow card) 5'	(substituted off) 62'
FW	9	Roberto Cabañas
Substitutions:
MF	16	Jorge Guasch		(substituted on) 62'
FW	20	Ramón Hicks		(substituted on) 80'
Manager:
(Paraguay) Cayetano Ré

11 June 1986 (first round)
12:00 CST

Paraguay	2–2	Belgium
Cabañas 50', 76'	Report	Vercauteren 30'; Veyt 59'

Estadio Nemesio Díez, Toluca
Attendance: 16,000
Referee: Bogdan Dotchev (Bulgaria)

PARAGUAY:
GK	1	Roberto Fernández
DF	2	Juan Torales
DF	3	César Zabala
DF	5	Rogelio Delgado (c)
MF	16	Jorge Guasch
MF	6	Jorge Amado Nunes
MF	10	Adolfino Cañete
MF	8	Romerito	(yellow card) 55'
FW	7	Buenaventura Ferreira
FW	11	Alfredo Mendoza		(substituted off) 68'
FW	9	Roberto Cabañas
Substitutions:
FW	20	Ramón Hicks		(substituted on) 68'
Manager:
(Paraguay) Cayetano Ré

BELGIUM:
GK	1	Jean-Marie Pfaff
DF	5	Michel Renquin
DF	19	Hugo Broos
DF	13	Georges Grün		(substituted off) 89'
MF	21	Stéphane Demol
MF	6	Franky Vercauteren
MF	22	Patrick Vervoort
MF	8	Enzo Scifo
MF	11	Jan Ceulemans (c)	(yellow card) 55'
FW	16	Nico Claesen
FW	18	Daniel Veyt
Substitutions:
DF	3	Franky Van der Elst		(substituted on) 89'
Manager:
(Belgium) Guy Thys

18 June 1986 (round of 16)
12:00 CST

England	3 – 0	Paraguay
Lineker 31', 73'; Beardsley 56'	Report

Estadio Azteca, Mexico City
Attendance: 98,728
Referee: Jamal Al Sharif (Syria)

ENGLAND:
GK	1	Peter Shilton (c)
DF	2	Gary M. Stevens
DF	3	Kenny Sansom
DF	5	Alvin Martin	(yellow card) 37'
DF	6	Terry Butcher
MF	16	Peter Reid		(substituted off) 58'
MF	4	Glenn Hoddle
MF	17	Trevor Steven
MF	18	Steve Hodge	(yellow card) 67'
FW	20	Peter Beardsley		(substituted off) 80'
FW	10	Gary Lineker
Substitutions:
DF	15	Gary A. Stevens		(substituted on) 58'
FW	9	Mark Hateley		(substituted on) 80'
Manager:
(England) Bobby Robson

PARAGUAY:
GK	1	Roberto Fernández
DF	2	Juan Torales		(substituted off) 64'
DF	3	César Zabala
DF	4	Vladimiro Schettina
DF	5	Rogelio Delgado (c)
MF	6	Jorge Amado Nunes	(yellow card) 60'
MF	10	Adolfino Cañete
MF	8	Romerito
FW	7	Buenaventura Ferreira
FW	11	Alfredo Mendoza
FW	9	Roberto Cabañas
Substitutions:
MF	16	Jorge Guasch		(substituted on) 64'
Manager:
(Paraguay) Cayetano Ré

=== 1998 FIFA World Cup ===
A new generation of players helped end the World Cup drought in grand fashion, as the Albirroja reached the 1998 World Cup in France by qualifying in second place in South America, behind Argentina. The first round matches were against Bulgaria (0–0), Spain (0–0), and Nigeria (3–1; goals Celso Ayala, Miguel Ángel Benítez and José Cardozo). Paraguay qualified to the second round (round of 16) to be defeated in a thrilling match against hosts and eventual World Champions France. France only scored through Laurent Blanc in the 114th minute, during the second half of overtime (making it the first golden goal scored in a World Cup). Paraguay's central defending duo (Carlos Gamarra and Celso Ayala) and goalkeeper José Luis Chilavert were selected for the all-star World Cup team.

Pos	Team	Pld	W	D	L	GF	GA	GD	Pts	Qualification
1	Nigeria	3	2	0	1	5	5	0	6	Advance to knockout stage
2	Paraguay	3	1	2	0	3	1	+2	5	Advance to knockout stage
3	Spain	3	1	1	1	8	4	+4	4	
4	Bulgaria	3	0	1	2	1	7	−6	1	

Source: FIFA
12 June 1998 (first round)
14:30

Paraguay	0–0	Bulgaria
	Report

Stade de la Mosson, Montpellier
Attendance: 27,650
Referee: Abdul Rahman Al-Zeid (Saudi Arabia)

Paraguay
Bulgaria

GK	1	José Luis Chilavert (c)
DF	4	Carlos Gamarra
DF	5	Celso Ayala
FW	9	José Cardozo		(substituted off) 70'
MF	10	Roberto Acuña
DF	11	Pedro Sarabia
MF	13	Carlos Paredes
FW	15	Miguel Benítez	(yellow card) 45'
MF	16	Julio Cesar Enciso
MF	19	Carlos Morales		(substituted off) 43'
MF	21	Jorge Campos		(substituted off) 78'
Substitutions:
DF	20	Denis Caniza		(substituted on) 43'
FW	18	César Ramírez		(substituted on) 70'
MF	7	Julio César Yegros		(substituted on) 78'
Manager:
(Brazil) Paulo César Carpegiani

GK	1	Zdravko Zdravkov
DF	2	Radostin Kishishev
DF	3	Trifon Ivanov (c)	(yellow card) 73'
DF	4	Ivaylo Petkov
MF	5	Ivaylo Yordanov
MF	6	Zlatko Yankov
FW	8	Hristo Stoichkov	(yellow card) 45'
FW	9	Luboslav Penev		(substituted off) 68'
MF	10	Krassimir Balakov
MF	11	Ilian Iliev		(substituted off) 77'
MF	16	Anatoli Nankov	(yellow card) 27' (yellow-red card) 89'
Substitutions:
FW	7	Emil Kostadinov		(substituted on) 68'
MF	18	Daniel Borimirov		(substituted on) 77'
Manager:
Hristo Bonev

Assistant referees:
Achmat Salie (South Africa)
Hussain Ghadanfari (Kuwait)
Fourth official:
Nikolai Levnikov (Russia)

19 June 1998 (first round)
21:00

Spain	0–0	Paraguay
	Report

Stade Geoffroy-Guichard, Saint-Étienne
Attendance: 30,600
Referee: Ian McLeod (South Africa)

Spain
Paraguay

GK	1	Andoni Zubizarreta (c)
RB	15	Juan Carlos Aguilera
CB	5	Abelardo		(substituted off) 56'
CB	4	Rafael Alkorta
LB	12	Sergi	(yellow card) 8'
RM	17	Joseba Etxeberria
CM	6	Fernando Hierro
CM	18	Guillermo Amor
LM	21	Luis Enrique
CF	9	Juan Antonio Pizzi		(substituted off) 52'
CF	10	Raúl		(substituted off) 65'
Substitutions:
FW	7	Fernando Morientes		(substituted on) 52'
MF	16	Albert Celades		(substituted on) 56'
FW	19	Kiko	(yellow card) 87'	(substituted on) 65'
Manager:
Javier Clemente

GK	1	José Luis Chilavert (c)
DF	2	Francisco Arce	(yellow card) 76'
DF	4	Carlos Gamarra
DF	5	Celso Ayala	(yellow card) 30'	(substituted off) 73'
FW	8	Arístides Rojas		(substituted off) 83'
MF	10	Roberto Acuña
DF	11	Pedro Sarabia
FW	15	Miguel Benítez
MF	16	Julio César Enciso	(yellow card) 45'
DF	20	Denis Caniza
MF	21	Jorge Campos		(substituted off) 45'
Substitutions:
MF	13	Carlos Paredes		(substituted on) 45'
MF	7	Julio César Yegros		(substituted on) 73'
FW	18	César Ramírez		(substituted on) 83'
Manager:
(Brazil) Paulo César Carpegiani

Assistant referees:
Aristidis Chris Soldatos (South Africa)
Owen Powell (Jamaica)
Fourth official:
Esse Baharmast (United States)

24 June 1998 (first round)
21:00

Nigeria	1–3	Paraguay
Oruma 10'	Report	Ayala 1'; Benítez 58'; Cardozo 86'

Stade de Toulouse, Toulouse
Attendance: 33,500
Referee: Pirom Un-Prasert (Thailand)

Nigeria
Paraguay

GK	1	Peter Rufai (c)
FW	4	Nwankwo Kanu
DF	6	Taribo West
FW	9	Rasheed Yekini
MF	11	Garba Lawal
MF	13	Tijani Babangida
MF	15	Sunday Oliseh		(substituted off) 45'
DF	16	Uche Okafor
DF	17	Augustine Eguavoen	(yellow card) 25'
MF	18	Wilson Oruma		(substituted off) 68'
DF	19	Ben Iroha	(yellow card) 38'
Substitutions:
DF	21	Godwin Okpara		(substituted on) 45'
MF	7	Finidi George		(substituted on) 68'
Manager:
(Serbia and Montenegro) Bora Milutinović

GK	1	José Luis Chilavert (c)
DF	2	Francisco Arce
DF	4	Carlos Gamarra
DF	5	Celso Ayala
FW	9	José Cardozo
DF	11	Pedro Sarabia
MF	13	Carlos Paredes
FW	15	Miguel Benítez	(substituted off) 67'
MF	16	Julio César Enciso
FW	17	Hugo Brizuela	(substituted off) 77'
DF	20	Denis Caniza	(substituted off) 55'
Substitutions:
MF	7	Julio César Yegros	(substituted on) 55'
MF	10	Roberto Acuña	(substituted on) 67'
FW	8	Aristides Rojas	(substituted on) 77'
Manager:
(Brazil) Paulo César Carpegiani

Assistant referees:
Mohamed Al Musawi (Oman)
Mikael Milsson (Sweden)
Fourth official:
Masayoshi Okada (Japan)

28 June 1998 (round of 16)
16:30

France	1 – 0 (a.e.t.)	Paraguay
Blanc 113'	Report

Stade Félix-Bollaert, Lens
Attendance: 38,100
Referee: Ali Bujsaim (United Arab Emirates)

France
Paraguay

GK	16	Fabien Barthez
RB	15	Lilian Thuram
CB	5	Laurent Blanc
CB	8	Marcel Desailly
LB	3	Bixente Lizarazu
CM	7	Didier Deschamps (c)
CM	17	Emmanuel Petit	(substituted off) 69'
RW	13	Bernard Diomède	(substituted off) 76'
LW	6	Youri Djorkaeff
CF	20	David Trezeguet
CF	12	Thierry Henry	(substituted off) 64'
Substitutes:
MF	11	Robert Pires	(substituted on) 64'
MF	14	Alain Boghossian	(substituted on) 69'
FW	9	Stéphane Guivarc'h	(substituted on) 76'
Manager:
Aimé Jacquet

GK	1	José Luis Chilavert (c)	(yellow card) 19'
RB	2	Francisco Arce	(yellow card) 84'
CB	4	Carlos Gamarra
CB	5	Celso Ayala
LB	11	Pedro Sarabia
CM	10	Roberto Acuña
CM	16	Julio César Enciso	(yellow card) 32'
CM	13	Carlos Humberto Paredes		(substituted off) 74'
AM	21	Jorge Luis Campos		(substituted off) 55'
AM	15	Miguel Ángel Benítez	(yellow card) 23'
CF	9	José Cardozo		(substituted off) 91'
Substitutes:
MF	7	Julio César Yegros		(substituted on) 55'
DF	20	Denis Caniza		(substituted on) 74'
MF	8	Aristides Rojas		(substituted on) 91'
Manager:
(Brazil) Paulo César Carpegiani

Assistant referees:
Nimal Wickeramatunge (Sri Lanka)
Lencie Fred (Vanuatu)
Fourth official:
Esse Baharmast (United States)

=== 2002 FIFA World Cup ===
Paraguay returned to the world's greatest stage once more in the 2002 World Cup. In their first match, Paraguay tied South Africa 2–2 (goals: Roque Santa Cruz and Francisco Arce). Paraguay lost to Spain in the second game (1–3) and finally defeated Slovenia (3–1; goals Nelson Cuevas, twice, and Jorge Luis Campos) to qualify for the second round. Germany ended Paraguay's dreams in the World Cup with an 88-minute goal.

Pos	Team	Pld	W	D	L	GF	GA	GD	Pts	Qualification
1	Spain	3	3	0	0	9	4	+5	9	Advance to knockout stage
2	Paraguay	3	1	1	1	6	6	0	4	Advance to knockout stage
3	South Africa	3	1	1	1	5	5	0	4	
4	Slovenia	3	0	0	3	2	7	−5	0	

Source: FIFA
Rules for classification: Tie-breaking criteria

All times local (UTC+9)

2 June 2002 (first round)
16:30

Paraguay	2–2	South Africa
Santa Cruz 39'; Arce 55'	Report	Mokoena 63'; Fortune 90+1' (pen.)

Busan Asian Main Stadium, Busan
Attendance: 25,186
Referee: Ľuboš Micheľ (Slovakia)

Paraguay
South Africa

GK	22	Ricardo Tavarelli	(yellow card) 90'
CB	18	Julio César Cáceres	(yellow card) 35'
CB	5	Celso Ayala
CB	4	Carlos Gamarra (c)
RWB	2	Francisco Arce
LWB	21	Denis Caniza	(yellow card) 65'
CM	10	Roberto Miguel Acuña
CM	6	Estanislao Struway		(substituted off) 86'
CM	8	Guido Alvarenga		(substituted off) 66'
AM	11	Jorge Campos		(substituted off) 73'
CF	9	Roque Santa Cruz
Substitutions:
MF	14	Diego Gavilán		(substituted on) 66'
MF	16	Gustavo Morínigo		(substituted on) 73'
DF	17	Juan Carlos Franco	(yellow card) 90+3'	(substituted on) 86'
Manager:
(Italy) Cesare Maldini

GK	16	Andre Arendse
RB	4	Aaron Mokoena	(yellow card) 3'
CB	13	Pierre Issa	(yellow card) 9'	(substituted off) 27'
CB	19	Lucas Radebe (c)
LB	3	Bradley Carnell
RM	2	Cyril Nzama
CM	12	Teboho Mokoena
CM	6	MacBeth Sibaya
LM	7	Quinton Fortune
CF	17	Benni McCarthy	(yellow card) 38'	(substituted off) 78'
CF	15	Sibusiso Zuma	(yellow card) 45+2'
Substitutions:
MF	9	MacDonald Mukasi		(substituted on) 27'
FW	23	George Koumantarakis		(substituted on) 78'
Manager:
Jomo Sono

Man of the Match:
Francisco Arce (Paraguay)

Assistant referees:
Igor Šramka (Slovakia)
Curtis Charles (Antigua and Barbuda)
Fourth official:
Hugh Dallas (Scotland)

7 June 2002 (first round)
18:00

Spain	3–1	Paraguay
Morientes 53', 69'; Hierro 83' (pen.)	Report	Puyol 10' (o.g.)

Jeonju World Cup Stadium, Jeonju
Attendance: 24,000
Referee: Gamal Al-Ghandour (Egypt)

Spain
Paraguay

GK	1	Iker Casillas
RB	5	Carles Puyol
CB	6	Fernando Hierro (c)
CB	20	Miguel Ángel Nadal
LB	3	Juanfran
RM	21	Luis Enrique		(substituted off) 46'
CM	8	Rubén Baraja	(yellow card) 9'
CM	17	Juan Carlos Valerón		(substituted off) 85'
LM	11	Javier de Pedro
CF	7	Raúl
CF	10	Diego Tristán		(substituted off) 46'
Substitutions:
MF	4	Iván Helguera		(substituted on) 46'
FW	9	Fernando Morientes		(substituted on) 46'
MF	19	Xavi		(substituted on) 85'
Manager:
José Antonio Camacho

GK	1	José Luis Chilavert (c)
CB	18	Julio César Cáceres
CB	5	Celso Ayala
CB	4	Carlos Gamarra
RWB	2	Francisco Arce	(yellow card) 44'
LWB	21	Denis Caniza		(substituted off) 78'
CM	14	Diego Gavilán	(yellow card) 60'
CM	10	Roberto Acuña
CM	13	Carlos Paredes
CF	9	Roque Santa Cruz	(yellow card) 80'
CF	20	José Cardozo		(substituted off) 63'
Substitutions:
FW	11	Jorge Campos		(substituted on) 63'
MF	6	Estanislao Struway		(substituted on) 78'
Manager:
(Italy) Cesare Maldini

Man of the Match:
Fernando Morientes (Spain)

Assistant referees:
Wagih Farag (Egypt)
Brighton Mudzamiri (Zimbabwe)
Fourth official:
Mohamed Guezzaz (Morocco)

12 June 2002 (first round)
20:30

Slovenia	1–3	Paraguay
Ačimovič 45+1'	Report	Cuevas 65', 84'; Campos 73'

Jeju World Cup Stadium, Seogwipo
Attendance: 30,176
Referee: Felipe Ramos (Mexico)

Slovenia
Paraguay

GK	12	Mladen Dabanovič
CB	22	Spasoje Bulajič
CB	3	Željko Milinovič	(yellow card) 79'
CB	15	Rajko Tavčar
RM	7	Đoni Novak
CM	8	Aleš Čeh (c)
CM	11	Miran Pavlin	(yellow card) 15'	(substituted off) 40'
LM	19	Amir Karić	(yellow card) 68'
AM	18	Milenko Ačimovič		(substituted off) 62'
CF	21	Sebastjan Cimirotič
CF	9	Milan Osterc		(substituted off) 77'
Substitutions:
FW	13	Mladen Rudonja	(yellow card) 69'	(substituted on) 40'
MF	20	Nastja Čeh	(red card) 81'	(substituted on) 62'
FW	16	Senad Tiganj		(substituted on) 77'
Manager:
Danilo Popivoda

GK	1	José Luis Chilavert (c)
CB	18	Julio César Cáceres
CB	5	Celso Ayala
CB	4	Carlos Gamarra
RWB	2	Francisco Arce
LWB	21	Denis Caniza
CM	13	Carlos Paredes	(yellow card) 4' (yellow-red card) 22'
CM	10	Roberto Acuña
CM	8	Guido Alvarenga		(substituted off) 53'
CF	20	José Cardozo		(substituted off) 61'
CF	9	Roque Santa Cruz
Substitutions:
MF	11	Jorge Campos		(substituted on) 53'
FW	23	Nelson Cuevas		(substituted on) 61'	(substituted off) 92'
MF	17	Juan Carlos Franco			(substituted on) 92'
Manager:
(Italy) Cesare Maldini

Man of the Match:
Nelson Cuevas (Paraguay)

Assistant referees:
Leif Lindberg (Sweden)
Visva Krishnan (Singapore)
Fourth official:
Kim Young-joo (South Korea)

15 June 2002 (round of 16)
15:30

Germany	1–0	Paraguay
Neuville 88'	Report

Jeju World Cup Stadium, Seogwipo
Attendance: 25,176
Referee: Carlos Alberto Batres (Guatemala)

Germany
Paraguay

GK	1	Oliver Kahn (c)
RB	22	Torsten Frings
CB	3	Marko Rehmer		(substituted off) 46'
CB	2	Thomas Linke
LB	21	Christoph Metzelder		(substituted off) 60'
RM	19	Bernd Schneider	(yellow card) 35'
CM	16	Jens Jeremies
CM	13	Michael Ballack	(yellow card) 90+2'
LM	17	Marco Bode
CF	7	Oliver Neuville		(substituted off) 90+2'
CF	11	Miroslav Klose
Substitutions:
MF	15	Sebastian Kehl		(substituted on) 46'
DF	4	Frank Baumann	(yellow card) 71'	(substituted on) 60'
FW	14	Gerald Asamoah		(substituted on) 90+2'
Manager:
Rudi Völler

GK	1	José Luis Chilavert (c)
RB	2	Francisco Arce
CB	18	Julio César Cáceres
CB	5	Celso Ayala
CB	4	Carlos Gamarra
LB	21	Denis Caniza
CM	15	Carlos Bonet		(substituted off) 84'
CM	10	Roberto Acuña	(yellow card) 26' (red card) 90+2'
CM	6	Estanislao Struway		(substituted off) 90+1'
CF	20	José Cardozo	(yellow card) 50'
CF	9	Roque Santa Cruz		(substituted off) 29'
Substitutions:
FW	11	Jorge Campos		(substituted on) 29'
MF	14	Diego Gavilán		(substituted on) 84'
FW	23	Nelson Cuevas		(substituted on) 90+1'
Manager:
(Italy) Cesare Maldini

Man of the Match:
Jens Jeremies (Germany)

Assistant referees:
Curtis Charles (Antigua and Barbuda)
Dramane Dante (Mali)
Fourth official:
Hugh Dallas (Scotland)

=== 2006 FIFA World Cup ===
In 2006, Paraguay qualified for its third World Cup in a row. This time, two early defeats against England and Sweden (both 0–1) sent the team home early. The only consolation was defeating Trinidad and Tobago during the last and final group game by 2–0.

Pos	Team	Pld	W	D	L	GF	GA	GD	Pts	Qualification
1	England	3	2	1	0	5	2	+3	7	Advance to knockout stage
2	Sweden	3	1	2	0	3	2	+1	5	Advance to knockout stage
3	Paraguay	3	1	0	2	2	2	0	3	
4	Trinidad and Tobago	3	0	1	2	0	4	−4	1	

Source: FIFA
Rules for classification: Tie-breaking criteria

All times local (CEST/UTC+2)

10 June 2006 (first round)
15:00

England	1–0	Paraguay
Gamarra 3' (o.g.)	Report

FIFA WM Stadion Frankfurt, Frankfurt
Attendance: 48,000
Referee: Marco Rodríguez (Mexico)

England
Paraguay

GK	1	Paul Robinson
RB	2	Gary Neville
CB	5	Rio Ferdinand
CB	6	John Terry
LB	3	Ashley Cole
DM	4	Steven Gerrard	(yellow card) 19'
RM	7	David Beckham (c)
LM	11	Joe Cole		(substituted off) 83'
AM	8	Frank Lampard
CF	10	Michael Owen		(substituted off) 56'
CF	21	Peter Crouch	(yellow card) 63'
Substitutions:
MF	20	Stewart Downing		(substituted on) 56'
MF	16	Owen Hargreaves		(substituted on) 83'
Manager:
(Sweden) Sven-Göran Eriksson

GK	1	Justo Villar		(substituted off) 8'
RB	21	Denis Caniza
CB	5	Julio César Cáceres
CB	4	Carlos Gamarra (c)
LB	3	Delio Toledo		(substituted off) 82'
RM	6	Carlos Bonet		(substituted off) 68'
CM	13	Carlos Humberto Paredes
CM	10	Roberto Miguel Acuña
LM	16	Cristian Riveros
CF	9	Roque Santa Cruz
CF	18	Nelson Valdez	(yellow card) 22'
Substitutions:
GK	22	Aldo Bobadilla		(substituted on) 8'
FW	23	Nelson Cuevas		(substituted on) 68'
DF	2	Jorge Núñez		(substituted on) 82'
Manager:
(Uruguay) Aníbal Ruiz

Man of the Match:
Frank Lampard (England)

Assistant referees:
José Luis Camargo (Mexico)
Leonel Leal (Costa Rica)
Fourth official:
Coffi Codjia (Benin)
Fifth official:
Celestin Ntagungira (Rwanda)

15 June 2006 (first round)
21:00

Sweden	1–0	Paraguay
Ljungberg 89'	Report

Olympiastadion, Berlin
Attendance: 72,000
Referee: Ľuboš Micheľ (Slovakia)

Sweden
Paraguay

GK	1	Andreas Isaksson
RB	7	Niclas Alexandersson
CB	3	Olof Mellberg (c)
CB	4	Teddy Lučić	(yellow card) 48'
LB	5	Erik Edman
DM	6	Tobias Linderoth	(yellow card) 14'
RM	21	Christian Wilhelmsson		(substituted off) 68'
LM	9	Freddie Ljungberg
AM	16	Kim Källström		(substituted off) 86'
CF	10	Zlatan Ibrahimović		(substituted off) 46'
CF	11	Henrik Larsson
Substitutions:
FW	20	Marcus Allbäck	(yellow card) 60'	(substituted on) 46'
FW	18	Mattias Jonson		(substituted on) 68'
FW	17	Johan Elmander		(substituted on) 86'
Manager:
Lars Lagerbäck

GK	22	Aldo Bobadilla
RB	2	Jorge Núñez	(yellow card) 54'
CB	5	Julio César Cáceres
CB	4	Carlos Gamarra (c)
LB	21	Denis Caniza	(yellow card) 3'
RM	6	Carlos Bonet		(substituted off) 81'
CM	10	Roberto Miguel Acuña	(yellow card) 51'
CM	13	Carlos Humberto Paredes	(yellow card) 74'
LM	16	Cristian Riveros		(substituted off) 62'
SS	9	Roque Santa Cruz		(substituted off) 63'
CF	18	Nelson Valdez
Substitutions:
MF	19	Julio dos Santos		(substituted on) 62'
FW	20	Dante López		(substituted on) 63'
MF	8	Édgar Barreto	(yellow card) 85'	(substituted on) 81'
Manager:
(Uruguay) Aníbal Ruiz

Man of the Match:
Freddie Ljungberg (Sweden)

Assistant referees:
Roman Slysko (Slovakia)
Martin Balko (Slovakia)
Fourth official:
Jerome Damon (South Africa)
Fifth official:
Enock Molefe (South Africa)

20 June 2006 (first round)
21:00

Paraguay	2–0	Trinidad and Tobago
Sancho 25' (o.g.); Cuevas 86'	Report

Fritz-Walter-Stadion, Kaiserslautern
Attendance: 46,000
Referee: Roberto Rosetti (Italy)

Paraguay
Trinidad and Tobago

GK	22	Aldo Bobadilla
RB	21	Denis Caniza		(substituted off) 89'
CB	5	Julio César Cáceres		(substituted off) 77'
CB	4	Carlos Gamarra (c)
LB	2	Jorge Núñez
DM	10	Roberto Miguel Acuña
RM	19	Julio dos Santos	(yellow card) 54'
LM	8	Edgar Barreto
AM	13	Carlos Humberto Paredes	(yellow card) 30'
CF	9	Roque Santa Cruz
CF	18	Nelson Valdez		(substituted off) 66'
Substitutions:
FW	23	Nelson Cuevas		(substituted on) 66'
DF	15	Julio Manzur		(substituted on) 77'
DF	14	Paulo da Silva		(substituted on) 89'
Manager:
(Uruguay) Aníbal Ruiz

GK	21	Kelvin Jack
RB	11	Carlos Edwards
CB	5	Brent Sancho	(yellow card) 45'
CB	6	Dennis Lawrence
LB	3	Avery John		(substituted off) 31'
RM	7	Chris Birchall
CM	19	Dwight Yorke (c)
CM	9	Aurtis Whitley	(yellow card) 48'	(substituted off) 67'
LM	18	Densill Theobald
CF	14	Stern John
CF	13	Cornell Glen		(substituted off) 41'
Substitutions:
DF	15	Kenwyne Jones		(substituted on) 31'
MF	16	Evans Wise		(substituted on) 41'
MF	10	Russell Latapy		(substituted on) 67'
Manager:
(Netherlands) Leo Beenhakker

Man of the Match:
Julio dos Santos (Paraguay)

Assistant referees:
Cristiano Copelli (Italy)
Alessandro Stagnelli (Italy)
Fourth official:
Frank De Bleeckere (Belgium)
Fifth official:
Peter Hermans (Belgium)

=== 2010 FIFA World Cup ===
In their fourth consecutive World Cup appearance, Paraguay eventually reached the quarter-finals. Drawn into Group F along with defending champions Italy, Slovakia and New Zealand, they opened their tournament with a draw against the Italians, in a game where they took the lead thanks to a first-half goal from Antolín Alcaraz but ultimately finished 1-1. In their second match, they beat Slovakia 2–0 with goals from Enrique Vera and Christian Riveros. Their final group match saw a goalless draw with New Zealand, clinching first place in Group F and setting up a date with Japan. Another goalless draw with the Japanese after 120 minutes went to penalties, which Paraguay won 5–3, advancing them for the first time in their history to the World Cup round of eight. In the quarter-finals, they met powerhouses Spain, to whom they lost 1–0 in a game where a goal by Nelson Valdez was controversially called an offside by the referee. The game also featured each team being awarded a penalty, both of which were contained, first by Spain's Iker Casillas and then Paraguay's Justo Villar (both were also team captains for the game).

The Albirroja arrived back from South Africa on Monday, July 5 at 3:30 AM. Upon arrival, they were greeted by over 3,000 fans at the airport and were decorated by the President of Paraguay. Gerardo Martino announced that he would take some time to decide his future, although the Paraguayan Football Association has offered him a four-year contract to continue at the helm. Roque Santa Cruz also announced that this would be his last World Cup, but that he may play one more tournament, the Copa América in Argentina in 2011, which he ended up playing in.

Pos	Team	Pld	W	D	L	GF	GA	GD	Pts	Qualification
1	Paraguay	3	1	2	0	3	1	+2	5	Advance to knockout stage
2	Slovakia	3	1	1	1	4	5	−1	4	Advance to knockout stage
3	New Zealand	3	0	3	0	2	2	0	3	
4	Italy	3	0	2	1	4	5	−1	2	

Source: FIFA
Rules for classification: Tie-breaking criteria

All times local (UTC+02)

14 June 2010 (first round)
20:30

Italy	1–1	Paraguay
De Rossi 63'	Report	Alcaraz 39'

Cape Town Stadium, Cape Town
Attendance: 62,869
Referee: Benito Archundia (Mexico)

Italy
Paraguay

GK	1	Gianluigi Buffon		(substituted off) 46'
RB	19	Gianluca Zambrotta
CB	5	Fabio Cannavaro (c)
CB	4	Giorgio Chiellini
LB	3	Domenico Criscito
CM	6	Daniele De Rossi
CM	22	Riccardo Montolivo
AM	15	Claudio Marchisio		(substituted off) 59'
RW	7	Simone Pepe
LW	9	Vincenzo Iaquinta
CF	11	Alberto Gilardino		(substituted off) 72'
Substitutions:
GK	12	Federico Marchetti		(substituted on) 46'
MF	16	Mauro Camoranesi	(yellow card) 70'	(substituted on) 59'
FW	10	Antonio Di Natale		(substituted on) 72'
Manager:
Marcello Lippi

GK	1	Justo Villar (c)
RB	6	Carlos Bonet
CB	21	Antolín Alcaraz
CB	14	Paulo da Silva
LB	3	Claudio Morel
DM	15	Víctor Cáceres	(yellow card) 62'
RM	13	Enrique Vera
CM	16	Cristian Riveros
LM	17	Aureliano Torres		(substituted off) 60'
SS	18	Nelson Valdez		(substituted off) 68'
CF	19	Lucas Barrios		(substituted off) 76'
Substitutions:
MF	11	Jonathan Santana		(substituted on) 60'
FW	9	Roque Santa Cruz		(substituted on) 68'
FW	7	Óscar Cardozo		(substituted on) 76'
Manager:
Gerardo Martino

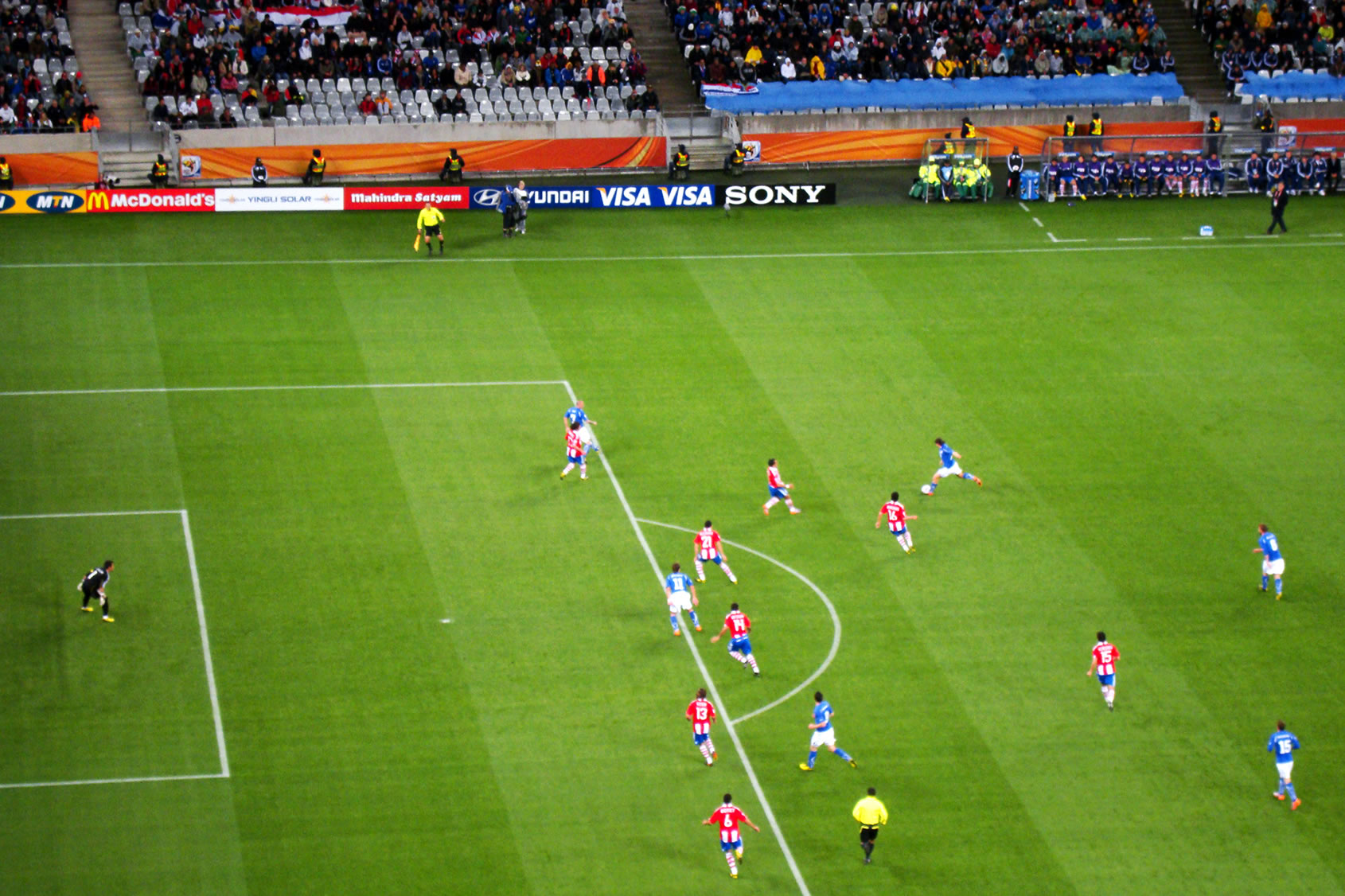
Italy vs Paraguay

Man of the Match:
Antolín Alcaraz (Paraguay)

Assistant referees:
Héctor Vergara (Canada)
Marvin Torrentera (Mexico)
Fourth official:
Joel Aguilar (El Salvador)
Fifth official:
Juan Zumba (El Salvador)

20 June 2010 (first round)
13:30

Slovakia	0–2	Paraguay
	Report	Vera 27'; Riveros 86'

Free State Stadium, Bloemfontein
Attendance: 26,643
Referee: Eddy Maillet (Seychelles)

Slovakia
Paraguay

GK	1	Ján Mucha
RB	2	Peter Pekarík
CB	3	Martin Škrtel
CB	21	Kornel Saláta		(substituted off) 83'
LB	16	Ján Ďurica	(yellow card) 42'
DM	6	Zdeno Štrba
CM	17	Marek Hamšík (c)
RW	9	Stanislav Šesták	(yellow card) 47'	(substituted off) 70'
LW	7	Vladimír Weiss	(yellow card) 84'
SS	8	Ján Kozák
CF	11	Róbert Vittek
Substitutions:
FW	13	Filip Hološko		(substituted on) 70'
MF	15	Miroslav Stoch		(substituted on) 83'
Manager:
Vladimír Weiss

GK	1	Justo Villar (c)
RB	6	Carlos Bonet
CB	14	Paulo da Silva
CB	21	Antolín Alcaraz
LB	3	Claudio Morel
DM	15	Víctor Cáceres
CM	13	Enrique Vera	(yellow card) 45'	(substituted off) 88'
CM	16	Cristian Riveros
AM	18	Nelson Valdez		(substituted off) 68'
SS	9	Roque Santa Cruz
CF	19	Lucas Barrios		(substituted off) 82'
Substitutions:
DF	17	Aureliano Torres		(substituted on) 68'
FW	7	Óscar Cardozo		(substituted on) 82'
MF	8	Édgar Barreto		(substituted on) 88'
Manager:
Gerardo Martino

Man of the Match:
Enrique Vera (Paraguay)

Assistant referees:
Evarist Menkouande (Cameroon)
Bechir Hassani (Tunisia)
Fourth official:
Joel Aguilar (El Salvador)
Fifth official:
Juan Zumba (El Salvador)

24 June 2010 (first round)
16:00

Paraguay	0–0	New Zealand
	Report

Peter Mokaba Stadium, Polokwane
Attendance: 34,850
Referee: Yuichi Nishimura (Japan)

Paraguay
New Zealand

GK	1	Justo Villar
RB	4	Denis Caniza (c)
CB	5	Julio Cáceres
CB	14	Paulo da Silva
LB	3	Claudio Morel
DM	15	Víctor Cáceres	(yellow card) 10'
CM	16	Cristian Riveros
CM	13	Enrique Vera
AM	9	Roque Santa Cruz	(yellow card) 41'
AM	18	Nelson Valdez		(substituted off) 67'
CF	7	Óscar Cardozo		(substituted off) 66'
Substitutions:
FW	19	Lucas Barrios		(substituted on) 66'
FW	10	Édgar Benítez		(substituted on) 67'
Manager:
Gerardo Martino

GK	1	Mark Paston
RB	4	Winston Reid
CB	6	Ryan Nelsen (c)	(yellow card) 56'
LB	19	Tommy Smith
CM	7	Simon Elliott
CM	5	Ivan Vicelich
RM	11	Leo Bertos
LM	3	Tony Lochhead
AM	10	Chris Killen		(substituted off) 79'
AM	9	Shane Smeltz
CF	14	Rory Fallon		(substituted off) 69'
Substitutions:
FW	20	Chris Wood		(substituted on) 69'
MF	22	Jeremy Brockie		(substituted on) 79'
Manager:
Ricki Herbert

Man of the Match:
Roque Santa Cruz (Paraguay)

Assistant referees:
Toru Sagara (Japan)
Jeong Hae-sang (South Korea)
Fourth official:
Koman Coulibaly (Mali)
Fifth official:
Inacio Manuel Candido (Angola)

Paraguay and Japan met at the Loftus Versfeld Stadium in Pretoria on 29 June 2010. The match was decided by a penalty shoot-out after the score was locked at 0–0 for 120 minutes. Paraguay won the shoot-out and progressed to its first ever World Cup quarter-final. The match was a generally unexciting affair, as Japan adopted a defensive posture while Paraguay itself maintained a solid defence. The first half produced the occasional chance on goal with Lucas Barrios having a shot saved shortly before a long-distance shot from Daisuke Matsui hit the crossbar of Paraguay's goal. The second half was similar, with either side producing occasional chances to score rather than periods of dominance. The result of the deadlock was extra time, which continued goalless. A penalty shoot-out ensued, in which Yūichi Komano missed a spot kick for Japan. Paraguay scored all five of its penalties, clinching the win and passage to the quarter-finals. After the match, Japan head coach Takeshi Okada resigned and Shunsuke Nakamura retired from international football.

29 June 2010 (round of 16)
16:00

Paraguay	0–0 (a.e.t.)	Japan
	Report
Penalties
Barreto (penalty scored); Barrios (penalty scored); Riveros (penalty scored); Valdez (penalty scored); Cardozo (penalty scored)	5–3	(penalty scored) Endō; (penalty scored) Hasebe; (penalty missed) Komano; (penalty scored) Honda

Loftus Versfeld Stadium, Pretoria
Attendance: 36,742
Referee: Frank De Bleeckere (Belgium)

Paraguay
Japan

GK	1	Justo Villar (c)
RB	6	Carlos Bonet
CB	14	Paulo da Silva
CB	21	Antolín Alcaraz
LB	3	Claudio Morel
DM	20	Néstor Ortigoza		(substituted off) 75'
CM	13	Enrique Vera
CM	16	Cristian Riveros	(yellow card) 118'
RW	9	Roque Santa Cruz		(substituted off) 94'
LW	10	Édgar Benítez		(substituted off) 60'
CF	19	Lucas Barrios
Substitutions:
FW	18	Nelson Valdez		(substituted on) 60'
MF	8	Édgar Barreto		(substituted on) 75'
FW	7	Óscar Cardozo		(substituted on) 94'
Manager:
(Argentina) Gerardo Martino

GK	21	Eiji Kawashima
RB	3	Yūichi Komano
CB	22	Yuji Nakazawa
CB	4	Marcus Tulio Tanaka
LB	5	Yuto Nagatomo	(yellow card) 72'
DM	2	Yuki Abe		(substituted off) 81'
CM	17	Makoto Hasebe (c)
CM	7	Yasuhito Endō	(yellow card) 113'
RW	8	Daisuke Matsui	(yellow card) 58'	(substituted off) 65'
LW	16	Yoshito Ōkubo		(substituted off) 106'
CF	18	Keisuke Honda	(yellow card) 90+3'
Substitutions:
FW	9	Shinji Okazaki		(substituted on) 65'
MF	14	Kengo Nakamura		(substituted on) 81'
FW	11	Keiji Tamada		(substituted on) 106'
Manager:
Takeshi Okada

Man of the Match:
Keisuke Honda (Japan)

Assistant referees:
Peter Hermans (Belgium)
Walter Vromans (Belgium)
Fourth official:
Peter O'Leary (New Zealand)
Fifth official:
Matthew Taro (Solomon Islands)

On 3 July 2010, Spain defeated Paraguay 1–0 to secure entry to the semi-finals where they would meet Germany. It was the first time that Spain had progressed to the semi-final of a World Cup since 1950; while for the defeated Paraguay, the quarter-final appearance was also the country's best ever performance.

The first half of the match finished goalless, although both sides had chances to score and Paraguay's Nelson Valdez had a goal ruled out as offside. The match suddenly became eventful in the second half due to a string of penalty kicks. First, Óscar Cardozo was pulled down by Gerard Piqué in Spain's penalty area and Paraguay was awarded a penalty. Cardozo took the penalty himself but it was saved by Spain's goalkeeper Iker Casillas. Spain soon after launched an attack at the other end of the field, in which David Villa was ruled by the referee to have been brought down by Antolín Alcaraz. Xabi Alonso stepped up to take the penalty kick and seemed to have scored, only for the referee to order it be retaken because of encroachment by a Spanish player into the penalty area before the kick was taken. Xabi Alonso's retake was saved by Paraguayan goalkeeper Justo Villar. As a result, the score remained 0–0 after the three penalty kicks. Spain, however, ultimately managed to take the lead in the 82nd minute: David Villa collected a rebounded shot off the post from Pedro, to score himself off the post. The goal turned out to be the winner for Spain. After the match, Spain coach Vicente del Bosque conceded that his side were not playing at their best and were starved of possession. He also noted his view that Spain's next opponents Germany were the best team at the World Cup. Paraguay coach Gerardo Martino stated he would be leaving his position at the end of his contract.

3 July 2010 (Quarter-Finals)
20:30

Paraguay	0–1	Spain
	Report	Villa 83'

Ellis Park Stadium, Johannesburg
Attendance: 55,359
Referee: Carlos Batres (Guatemala)

Paraguay
Spain

GK	1	Justo Villar (c)
RB	2	Darío Verón
CB	14	Paulo da Silva
CB	21	Antolín Alcaraz	(yellow card) 59'
LB	3	Claudio Morel	(yellow card) 71'
DM	15	Víctor Cáceres	(yellow card) 59'	(substituted off) 84'
RM	11	Jonathan Santana	(yellow card) 88'
CM	8	Édgar Barreto		(substituted off) 64'
LM	16	Cristian Riveros
SS	18	Nelson Valdez		(substituted off) 72'
CF	7	Óscar Cardozo
Substitutions:
MF	13	Enrique Vera		(substituted on) 64'
FW	9	Roque Santa Cruz		(substituted on) 72'
FW	19	Lucas Barrios		(substituted on) 84'
Manager:
(Argentina) Gerardo Martino

GK	1	Iker Casillas (c)
RB	15	Sergio Ramos
CB	3	Gerard Piqué	(yellow card) 57'
CB	5	Carles Puyol		(substituted off) 84'
LB	11	Joan Capdevila
DM	16	Sergio Busquets	(yellow card) 63'
RM	6	Andrés Iniesta
CM	8	Xavi
LM	14	Xabi Alonso		(substituted off) 75'
SS	7	David Villa
CF	9	Fernando Torres		(substituted off) 56'
Substitutions:
MF	10	Cesc Fàbregas		(substituted on) 56'
FW	18	Pedro		(substituted on) 75'
DF	4	Carlos Marchena		(substituted on) 84'
Manager:
Vicente del Bosque

Man of the Match:
Andrés Iniesta (Spain)

Assistant referees:
Leonel Leal (Costa Rica)
Carlos Pastrana (Honduras)
Fourth official:
Benito Archundia (Mexico)
Fifth official:
Héctor Vergara (Canada)

=== 2026 FIFA World Cup ===
==== Group stage ====
Pos	Team	Pld	W	D	L	GF	GA	GD	Pts	Qualification
1	United States (H)	3	2	0	1	8	4	+4	6	Advance to knockout stage
2	Australia	3	1	1	1	2	2	0	4 (Note: Tied on head-to-head result (Paraguay 0–0 Australia). Overall goal difference was used as the tiebreaker.)	Advance to knockout stage
3	Paraguay	3	1	1	1	2	4	−2	4	Advance to knockout stage
4	Turkey	3	1	0	2	3	5	−2	3	

Source: FIFA
(H) Hosts
Notes:
June 12, 2026
6:00 p.m. UTC−7

United States	4–1	Paraguay
Bobadilla 7' (o.g.); Balogun 31', 45+5'; Reyna 90+8'	(Note: "USA vs Paraguay | First Stage | FIFA World Cup 2026". FIFA. Retrieved June 12, 2026.; "Match Report – Group D – USA v. Paraguay". FIFA. June 12, 2026. Retrieved June 12, 2026.; "Post match summary report – Group D – USA v. Paraguay". FIFA. June 13, 2026. Retrieved June 13, 2026.)	Maurício 73'

SoFi Stadium, Inglewood
Attendance: 70,492
Referee: Danny Makkelie (Netherlands)

June 19, 2026
8:00 p.m. UTC−7

Turkey	0–1	Paraguay
	(Note: "Türkiye vs Paraguay | First Stage | FIFA World Cup 2026". FIFA. Retrieved June 19, 2026.; "Match Report – Group D – Türkiye v. Paraguay". FIFA. June 19, 2026. Retrieved June 20, 2026.; "Post match summary report – Group D – Türkiye v. Paraguay". FIFA. June 19, 2026. Retrieved June 20, 2026.)	Galarza 2'

Levi's Stadium, Santa Clara
Attendance: 68,827
Referee: Iván Barton (El Salvador)

June 25, 2026
7:00 p.m. UTC−7

Paraguay	0–0	Australia
	(Note: "Paraguay vs Australia | First Stage | FIFA World Cup 2026". FIFA. Retrieved June 26, 2026.; "Match Report – Group D – Paraguay v. Australia". FIFA. June 26, 2026. Retrieved June 26, 2026.; "Post match summary report – Group D – Paraguay v. Australia". FIFA. June 26, 2026. Retrieved June 27, 2026.)

Levi's Stadium, Santa Clara
Attendance: 68,827
Referee: Clément Turpin (France)

==== Knockout stage ====
Round of 32

June 29, 2026
4:30 p.m. UTC−4

Germany	1–1 (a.e.t.)	Paraguay
Havertz 54'	(Note: "Germany vs Paraguay | Round of 32 | FIFA World Cup 2026". FIFA. Retrieved June 29, 2026.; "Match Report – Round of 32 – Germany v. Paraguay". FIFA. June 29, 2026. Retrieved June 29, 2026.; "Post match summary report – Round of 32 – Germany v. Paraguay". FIFA. June 30, 2026. Retrieved June 30, 2026.)	Enciso 42'
Penalties
Havertz (penalty missed); Kimmich (penalty scored); Musiala (penalty scored); Woltemade (penalty missed); Amiri (penalty scored); Tah (penalty missed)	3–4	(penalty scored) Maurício; (penalty scored) G. Gómez; (penalty scored) Galarza; (penalty missed) Sanabria; (penalty missed) Balbuena; (penalty scored) Canale

Gillette Stadium, Foxborough
Attendance: 63,945
Referee: Jalal Jayed (Morocco)

Round of 16

July 4, 2026
5:00 p.m. UTC−4

Paraguay	0–1	France
	(Note: "Paraguay vs France | Round of 16 | FIFA World Cup 2026". FIFA. Retrieved July 4, 2026.; "Match Report – Round of 16 – Paraguay v. France". FIFA. July 4, 2026. Retrieved July 4, 2026.; "Post match summary report – Round of 16 – Paraguay v. France". FIFA. July 4, 2026. Retrieved July 5, 2026.)	Mbappé 70' (pen.)

Lincoln Financial Field, Philadelphia
Attendance: 68,324
Referee: Ilgiz Tantashev (Uzbekistan)

== Player records ==
=== Most appearances ===
Rank	Player	Matches	World Cups
1	Denis Caniza	12	1998, 2002, 2006, 2010
1	Roque Santa Cruz	12	2002, 2006, 2010
3	Roberto Acuña	11	1998, 2002, 2006
3	Carlos Gamarra	11	1998, 2002, 2006
5	Carlos Paredes	9	1998, 2002, 2006
6	Celso Ayala	8	1998, 2002
6	Julio César Cáceres	8	2002, 2006, 2010
6	Nelson Valdez	8	2006, 2010
9	Francisco Arce	7	1998, 2002
9	Jorge Campos	7	1998, 2002
9	José Luis Chilavert	7	1998, 2002
9	Cristian Riveros	7	2006, 2010

=== Top goalscorers ===
On 20 July 1930, Luis Vargas Peña made history by scoring Paraguay's first-ever FIFA World Cup goal, doing so in their match against Belgium in Montevideo.

Player	Goals	1958	1986	2002	2006
Nelson Cuevas	3			2	1
Florencio Amarilla	2	2			
Jorge Romero	2	2			
José Parodi	2	2			
Juan Bautista Agüero	2	2			
Roberto Cabañas	2		2		
Romerito	2		2		
Total	15	8	4	2	1

== See also ==
- Paraguay at the Copa América
- South American nations at the FIFA World Cup
