= 1986 FIFA World Cup Group B =

Football tournament group stage

Group B of the 1986 FIFA World Cup was one of the groups of nations competing at the 1986 FIFA World Cup. The group's first round of matches began on 3 June and its last matches were played on 11 June. Matches were played at the Estadio Azteca in Mexico City and at the Estadio Nemesio Díez in Toluca. Host Mexico topped the group, joined in the second round by Belgium and by Paraguay, who were making their first appearance in the finals since 1958. Iraq, making their debut in the World Cup, lost all three of their matches and scored just one goal.

== Standings ==
Pos	Team	Pld	W	D	L	GF	GA	GD	Pts	Qualification
1	Mexico (H)	3	2	1	0	4	2	+2	5	Advance to knockout stage
2	Paraguay	3	1	2	0	4	3	+1	4	Advance to knockout stage
3	Belgium	3	1	1	1	5	5	0	3	Advance to knockout stage
4	Iraq	3	0	0	3	1	4	−3	0	

Source: FIFA
(H) Hosts

== Matches ==
=== Belgium vs Mexico ===
3 June 1986
12:00 CST

Belgium	1–2	Mexico
Vandenbergh 45'		Quirarte 23'; Sánchez 39'

Estadio Azteca, Mexico City
Attendance: 110,000
Referee: Carlos Espósito (Argentina)

Belgium	Mexico

GK	1	Jean-Marie Pfaff
DF	19	Hugo Broos
DF	2	Eric Gerets
DF	3	Franky Van der Elst	(yellow card) 56'
DF	4	Michel De Wolf
MF	6	Franky Vercauteren
MF	7	René Vandereycken
MF	10	Philippe Desmet		(substituted off) 60'
MF	8	Enzo Scifo
MF	11	Jan Ceulemans (c)
FW	9	Erwin Vandenbergh		(substituted off) 66'
Substitutions:
GK	12	Jacky Munaron
DF	5	Michel Renquin
DF	13	Georges Grün
FW	16	Nico Claesen		(substituted on) 60'
MF	21	Stéphane Demol		(substituted on) 66'
Manager:
(Belgium) Guy Thys

GK	1	Pablo Larios
DF	2	Mario Trejo
DF	3	Fernando Quirarte
DF	14	Félix Cruz
DF	17	Raúl Servín
MF	16	Carlos Muñoz	(yellow card) 83'
MF	10	Tomás Boy (c)		(substituted off) 69'
MF	13	Javier Aguirre
FW	22	Manuel Negrete
FW	15	Luis Flores		(substituted off) 79'
FW	9	Hugo Sánchez	(yellow card) 23'
Substitutions:
GK	20	Olaf Heredia
FW	5	Francisco Javier Cruz		(substituted on) 79'
MF	7	Miguel España		(substituted on) 69'
MF	8	Alejandro Domínguez
FW	11	Carlos Hermosillo
Manager:
(Socialist Federal Republic of Yugoslavia) Bora Milutinović

=== Paraguay vs Iraq ===
4 June 1986
12:00 CST

Paraguay	1–0	Iraq
Romerito 35'

Estadio Toluca 70–86, Toluca
Attendance: 24,000
Referee: Edwin Picon-Ackong (Mauritius)

Paraguay	Iraq

GK	1	Roberto Fernández
DF	2	Juan Torales
DF	3	César Zabala
DF	4	Vladimiro Schettina	(yellow card) 45'
DF	5	Rogelio Delgado (c)
MF	6	Jorge Amado Nunes
MF	10	Adolfino Cañete
MF	8	Romerito
FW	7	Buenaventura Ferreira
FW	11	Alfredo Mendoza		(substituted off) 88'
FW	9	Roberto Cabañas
Substitutions:
MF	16	Jorge Guasch		(substituted on) 88'
Manager:
(Paraguay) Cayetano Ré

GK	1	Raad Hammoudi (c)
DF	3	Khalil Allawi
DF	4	Nadhim Shaker
DF	5	Samir Shaker	(yellow card) 29'
DF	15	Natiq Hashim
DF	22	Ghanim Oraibi
MF	6	Ali Hussein Shihab
MF	7	Haris Mohammed		(substituted off) 67'
MF	14	Basil Gorgis		(substituted off) 81'
FW	10	Hussein Saeed
FW	8	Ahmed Radhi
Substitutions:
FW	11	Rahim Hameed		(substituted on) 67'
MF	19	Basim Qasim		(substituted on) 81'
Manager:
(Brazil) Evaristo de Macedo

=== Mexico vs Paraguay ===
7 June 1986
12:00 CST

Mexico	1–1	Paraguay
Flores 3'		Romerito 85'

Estadio Azteca, Mexico City
Attendance: 114,600
Referee: George Courtney (England)

Mexico	Paraguay

GK	1	Pablo Larios
DF	2	Mario Trejo	(yellow card) 80' (Note: Mistake in FIFA report. The footage clearly shows that Trejo was booked for deliberate handball in the 49th minute.)
DF	3	Fernando Quirarte
DF	14	Félix Cruz
DF	17	Raúl Servín
MF	16	Carlos Muñoz
MF	10	Tomás Boy (c)		(substituted off) 58'
MF	13	Javier Aguirre
FW	22	Manuel Negrete	(yellow card) 26'
FW	15	Luis Flores		(substituted off) 77'
FW	9	Hugo Sánchez	(yellow card) 75'
Substitutions:
MF	7	Miguel España		(substituted on) 58'
FW	5	Francisco Javier Cruz		(substituted on) 77'
Manager:
(Socialist Federal Republic of Yugoslavia) Bora Milutinović

GK	1	Roberto Fernández
DF	2	Juan Torales		(substituted off) 80'
DF	3	César Zabala
DF	4	Vladimiro Schettina	(yellow card) 30'
DF	5	Rogelio Delgado (c)
MF	6	Jorge Amado Nunes
MF	10	Adolfino Cañete
MF	8	Romerito
FW	7	Buenaventura Ferreira
FW	11	Alfredo Mendoza	(yellow card) 5'	(substituted off) 62'
FW	9	Roberto Cabañas
Substitutions:
MF	16	Jorge Guasch		(substituted on) 62'
FW	20	Ramón Hicks		(substituted on) 80'
Manager:
(Paraguay) Cayetano Ré

=== Iraq vs Belgium ===
8 June 1986
12:00 CST

Iraq	1–2	Belgium
Radhi 59'		Scifo 16'; Claesen 21' (pen.)

Estadio Toluca 70–86, Toluca
Attendance: 20,000
Referee: Jesús Díaz (Colombia)

Iraq	Belgium

GK	1	Raad Hammoudi (c)	(yellow card) 20'
DF	3	Khalil Allawi
DF	4	Nadhim Shaker	(yellow card) 29'
DF	5	Samir Shaker	(yellow card) 48'
DF	15	Natiq Hashim	(yellow card) 65'
DF	22	Ghanim Oraibi
MF	6	Ali Hussein Shihab
MF	7	Haris Mohammed	(yellow card) 42'
MF	14	Basil Gorgis	(yellow card) 52' (red card) 52'
FW	9	Karim Saddam		(substituted off) 81'
FW	8	Ahmed Radhi
Substitutions:
FW	11	Rahim Hameed		(substituted on) 81'
Manager:
(Brazil) Evaristo de Macedo

GK	1	Jean-Marie Pfaff
DF	2	Eric Gerets
DF	3	Franky Van der Elst
DF	4	Michel De Wolf
MF	21	Stéphane Demol		(substituted off) 69'
MF	6	Franky Vercauteren
MF	7	René Vandereycken
MF	10	Philippe Desmet
MF	8	Enzo Scifo		(substituted off) 67'
MF	11	Jan Ceulemans (c)
FW	16	Nico Claesen	(yellow card) 16'
Substitutions:
DF	14	Lei Clijsters		(substituted on) 67'
DF	13	Georges Grün		(substituted on) 69'
Manager:
(Belgium) Guy Thys

=== Paraguay vs Belgium ===
11 June 1986
12:00 CST

Paraguay	2–2	Belgium
Cabañas 50', 76'		Vercauteren 30'; Veyt 59'

Estadio Toluca 70–86, Toluca
Attendance: 16,000
Referee: Bogdan Dotchev (Bulgaria)

Paraguay	Belgium

GK	1	Roberto Fernández
DF	2	Juan Torales
DF	3	César Zabala
DF	5	Rogelio Delgado (c)
MF	16	Jorge Guasch
MF	6	Jorge Amado Nunes
MF	10	Adolfino Cañete
MF	8	Romerito	(yellow card) 55'
FW	7	Buenaventura Ferreira
FW	11	Alfredo Mendoza		(substituted off) 68'
FW	9	Roberto Cabañas
Substitutions:
GK	12	Jorge Battaglia
DF	13	Virginio Cáceres
DF	14	Luis Caballero
FW	18	Evaristo Isasi
FW	20	Ramón Hicks		(substituted on) 68'
Manager:
(Paraguay) Cayetano Ré (Note: Cayetano Ré was sent off by the referee in the 82nd minute.)

GK	1	Jean-Marie Pfaff
DF	5	Michel Renquin
DF	19	Hugo Broos
DF	13	Georges Grün		(substituted off) 89'
MF	21	Stéphane Demol
MF	6	Franky Vercauteren
MF	22	Patrick Vervoort
MF	8	Enzo Scifo
MF	11	Jan Ceulemans (c)	(yellow card) 55'
FW	16	Nico Claesen
FW	18	Daniel Veyt
Substitutions:
GK	12	Jacky Munaron
DF	3	Franky Van der Elst
DF	4	Michel De Wolf
DF	14	Leo Clijsters
MF	15	Leo Van der Elst		(substituted on) 89'
Manager:
(Belgium) Guy Thys

=== Iraq vs Mexico ===
11 June 1986
12:00 CST

Iraq	0–1	Mexico
		Quirarte 54'

Estadio Azteca, Mexico City
Attendance: 103,763
Referee: Zoran Petrović (Yugoslavia)

Iraq	Mexico

GK	20	Fatah Nsaief (c)
DF	2	Maad Ibrahim
DF	3	Khalil Allawi	(yellow card) 73'
DF	4	Nadhim Shaker
DF	15	Natiq Hashim		(substituted off) 60'
DF	22	Ghanim Oraibi
MF	6	Ali Hussein Shihab
MF	17	Anad Abid		(substituted off) 70'
MF	19	Basim Qasim
FW	9	Karim Saddam	(yellow card) 30'
FW	8	Ahmed Radhi
Substitutions:
GK	21	Ahmad Jassim
FW	11	Rahim Hameed		(substituted on) 60'
MF	12	Jamal Ali
MF	16	Shaker Mahmoud		(substituted on) 70'
MF	18	Ismail Mohammed
Manager:
(Brazil) Evaristo de Macedo

GK	1	Pablo Larios
DF	18	Rafael Amador	(substituted off) 62'
DF	3	Fernando Quirarte
DF	14	Félix Cruz
DF	17	Raúl Servín
MF	6	Carlos de los Cobos	(substituted off) 79'
MF	7	Miguel España
MF	10	Tomás Boy (c)
MF	13	Javier Aguirre
FW	22	Manuel Negrete
FW	15	Luis Flores
Substitutions:
GK	20	Olaf Heredia
DF	4	Armando Manzo
FW	5	Francisco Javier Cruz	(substituted on) 79'
MF	8	Alejandro Domínguez	(substituted on) 62'
FW	11	Carlos Hermosillo
Manager:
(Socialist Federal Republic of Yugoslavia) Bora Milutinović

== See also ==
- Belgium at the FIFA World Cup
- Iraq at the FIFA World Cup
- Mexico at the FIFA World Cup
- Paraguay at the FIFA World Cup
