= 1998 FIFA World Cup Group D =

Football tournament group stage

Group D of the 1998 FIFA World Cup was played from 12 to 24 June 1998. Nigeria won their first two games while Paraguay drew their first two games 0–0, which meant that Nigeria were certain of qualifying in first place with a game to spare. In their final game, Spain got their only victory after scoring six against Bulgaria, but were still eliminated in third place after Paraguay beat Nigeria. Thus, Spain were the only top seed not to advance to the second round, while all others topped their respective groups. On the other hand, Bulgaria could not repeat their surprise performance from the previous tournament, finishing last in the group with a single point.

== Standings ==
| Pos | Team | Pld | W | D | L | GF | GA | GD | Pts | Qualification |
|---|---|---|---|---|---|---|---|---|---|---|
| 1 | Nigeria | 3 | 2 | 0 | 1 | 5 | 5 | 0 | 6 | Advance to knockout stage |
| 2 | Paraguay | 3 | 1 | 2 | 0 | 3 | 1 | +2 | 5 | Advance to knockout stage |
| 3 | Spain | 3 | 1 | 1 | 1 | 8 | 4 | +4 | 4 | |
| 4 | Bulgaria | 3 | 0 | 1 | 2 | 1 | 7 | −6 | 1 | |

Source: FIFA
- Nigeria advanced to play Denmark (runner-up of Group C) in the round of 16.
- Paraguay advanced to play France (winner of Group C) in the round of 16.

== Matches ==
=== Paraguay vs Bulgaria ===
12 June 1998
14:30 CEST (UTC+2)

| Paraguay | 0–0 | Bulgaria |

Stade de la Mosson, Montpellier
Attendance: 29,800
Referee: Abdul Rahman Al-Zeid (Saudi Arabia)

| Paraguay | Bulgaria |

| GK | 1 | José Luis Chilavert (c) |
| CB | 4 | Carlos Gamarra |
| CB | 5 | Celso Ayala |
| CB | 11 | Pedro Sarabia |
| RWB | 19 | Carlos Morales | | (substituted off) 43' |
| LWB | 21 | Jorge Luis Campos | | (substituted off) 78' |
| CM | 10 | Roberto Acuña |
| CM | 13 | Carlos Paredes |
| CM | 16 | Julio César Enciso |
| SS | 15 | Miguel Ángel Benítez | (yellow card) 45' |
| CF | 9 | José Cardozo | | (substituted off) 70' |
Substitutions:
| DF | 20 | Denis Caniza | | (substituted on) 43' |
| FW | 18 | César Ramírez | | (substituted on) 70' |
| MF | 7 | Julio César Yegros | | (substituted on) 78' |
Manager:
(Brazil) Paulo César Carpegiani

| GK | 1 | Zdravko Zdravkov |
| RB | 2 | Radostin Kishishev |
| CB | 3 | Trifon Ivanov (c) | (yellow card) 73' |
| CB | 5 | Ivaylo Yordanov |
| LB | 4 | Ivaylo Petkov |
| RM | 16 | Anatoli Nankov | (yellow card) 27' (yellow-red card) 89' |
| CM | 6 | Zlatko Yankov |
| CM | 11 | Ilian Iliev | | (substituted off) 77' |
| LM | 10 | Krasimir Balakov |
| FW | 8 | Hristo Stoichkov | (yellow card) 45' |
| FW | 9 | Lyuboslav Penev | | (substituted off) 68' |
Substitutions:
| FW | 7 | Emil Kostadinov | | (substituted on) 68' |
| MF | 18 | Daniel Borimirov | | (substituted on) 77' |
Manager:
Hristo Bonev

Assistant referees:
Achmat Salie (South Africa)
Hussain Ghadanfari (Kuwait)
Fourth official:
Nikolai Levnikov (Russia)

=== Spain vs Nigeria ===
13 June 1998
14:30 CEST (UTC+2)

| Spain | 2–3 | Nigeria |
|---|---|---|
| Hierro 21'; Raúl 47' | | Adepoju 24'; Zubizarreta 73' (o.g.); Oliseh 78' |

Stade de la Beaujoire, Nantes
Attendance: 35,500
Referee: Esfandiar Baharmast (United States)

| Spain | Nigeria |

| GK | 1 | Andoni Zubizarreta (c) |
| RB | 2 | Albert Ferrer | | (substituted off) 45' |
| CB | 14 | Iván Campo | (yellow card) 75' |
| CB | 4 | Rafael Alkorta |
| LB | 12 | Sergi |
| DM | 20 | Miguel Ángel Nadal | (yellow card) 59' | (substituted off) 77' |
| DM | 6 | Fernando Hierro |
| AM | 21 | Luis Enrique |
| LF | 10 | Raúl |
| RF | 11 | Alfonso | | (substituted off) 58' |
| CF | 19 | Kiko |
Substitutions:
| MF | 18 | Guillermo Amor | (yellow card) 56' | (substituted on) 45' |
| FW | 17 | Joseba Etxeberria | | (substituted on) 58' |
| MF | 16 | Albert Celades | | (substituted on) 77' |
Manager:
Javier Clemente

| GK | 1 | Peter Rufai |
| RB | 2 | Mobi Oparaku | | (substituted off) 70' |
| CB | 5 | Uche Okechukwu (c) | (yellow card) 62' |
| CB | 6 | Taribo West |
| LB | 3 | Celestine Babayaro |
| DM | 15 | Sunday Oliseh |
| RM | 7 | Finidi George |
| CM | 8 | Mutiu Adepoju |
| CM | 10 | Jay-Jay Okocha |
| LM | 11 | Garba Lawal | | (substituted off) 90+3' |
| CF | 20 | Victor Ikpeba | | (substituted off) 83' |
Substitutions:
| FW | 9 | Rashidi Yekini | | (substituted on) 70' |
| MF | 13 | Tijani Babangida | | (substituted on) 83' |
| DF | 21 | Godwin Okpara | | (substituted on) 90+3' |
Manager:
(Federal Republic of Yugoslavia) Bora Milutinović

Assistant referees:
Luis Torres Zúñiga (Costa Rica)
Yuri Dupanov (Belarus)
Fourth official:
Ian McLeod (South Africa)

=== Nigeria vs Bulgaria ===
19 June 1998
17:30 CEST (UTC+2)

| Nigeria | 1–0 | Bulgaria |
|---|---|---|
| Ikpeba 28' |

Parc des Princes, Paris
Attendance: 45,500
Referee: Mario Sánchez Yantén (Chile)

| Nigeria | Bulgaria |

| GK | 1 | Peter Rufai |
| RB | 8 | Mutiu Adepoju | (yellow card) 20' |
| CB | 5 | Uche Okechukwu (c) | (yellow card) 44' |
| CB | 6 | Taribo West |
| LB | 3 | Celestine Babayaro |
| DM | 15 | Sunday Oliseh |
| RM | 7 | Finidi George | | (substituted off) 84' |
| AM | 10 | Jay-Jay Okocha | (yellow card) 70' |
| LM | 11 | Garba Lawal |
| CF | 14 | Daniel Amokachi | | (substituted off) 67' |
| CF | 20 | Victor Ikpeba | (yellow card) 49' | (substituted off) 75' |
Substitutions:
| FW | 4 | Nwankwo Kanu | | (substituted on) 67' |
| FW | 9 | Rasheed Yekini | | (substituted on) 75' |
| MF | 13 | Tijani Babangida | | (substituted on) 84' |
Manager:
(Federal Republic of Yugoslavia) Bora Milutinović

| GK | 1 | Zdravko Zdravkov |
| DF | 2 | Radostin Kishishev | (yellow card) 78' |
| DF | 3 | Trifon Ivanov (c) |
| DF | 4 | Ivaylo Petkov |
| MF | 6 | Zlatko Yankov | | (substituted off) 84' |
| FW | 7 | Emil Kostadinov |
| FW | 8 | Hristo Stoichkov |
| MF | 10 | Krasimir Balakov |
| MF | 11 | Ilian Iliev | (yellow card) 66' | (substituted off) 66' |
| DF | 13 | Gosho Ginchev |
| MF | 14 | Marian Hristov | | (substituted off) 45' |
Substitutions:
| MF | 18 | Daniel Borimirov | | (substituted on) 45' |
| FW | 9 | Lyuboslav Penev | | (substituted on) 66' |
| FW | 19 | Georgi Bachev | | (substituted on) 84' |
Manager:
Hristo Bonev

Assistant referees:
Jorge Díaz Gálvez (Chile)
Arnaldo Pinto (Brazil)
Fourth official:
Marcio Rezende (Brazil)

=== Spain vs Paraguay ===
19 June 1998
21:00 CEST (UTC+2)

| Spain | 0–0 | Paraguay |

Stade Geoffroy-Guichard, Saint-Étienne
Attendance: 30,600
Referee: Ian McLeod (South Africa)

| Spain | Paraguay |

| GK | 1 | Andoni Zubizarreta (c) |
| RB | 15 | Carlos Aguilera |
| CB | 5 | Abelardo | | (substituted off) 56' |
| CB | 4 | Rafael Alkorta |
| LB | 12 | Sergi | (yellow card) 8' |
| RM | 17 | Joseba Etxeberria |
| CM | 6 | Fernando Hierro |
| CM | 18 | Guillermo Amor |
| LM | 21 | Luis Enrique |
| SS | 10 | Raúl | | (substituted off) 65' |
| CF | 9 | Juan Antonio Pizzi | | (substituted off) 52' |
Substitutions:
| FW | 7 | Fernando Morientes | | (substituted on) 52' |
| MF | 16 | Albert Celades | | (substituted on) 56' |
| FW | 19 | Kiko | (yellow card) 87' | (substituted on) 65' |
Manager:
Javier Clemente

| GK | 1 | José Luis Chilavert (c) |
| DF | 2 | Francisco Arce | (yellow card) 76' |
| DF | 4 | Carlos Gamarra |
| DF | 5 | Celso Ayala | (yellow card) 30' |
| FW | 8 | Arístides Rojas | | (substituted off) 83' |
| MF | 10 | Roberto Acuña | (substituted off) 73' |
| DF | 11 | Pedro Sarabia |
| FW | 15 | Miguel Ángel Benítez |
| MF | 16 | Julio César Enciso |
| DF | 20 | Denis Caniza |
| MF | 21 | Jorge Luis Campos | | (substituted off) 45' |
Substitutions:
| MF | 13 | Carlos Paredes | | (substituted on) 45' |
| MF | 7 | Julio César Yegros | | (substituted on) 73' |
| FW | 18 | César Ramírez | | (substituted on) 83' |
Manager:
(Brazil) Paulo César Carpegiani

Assistant referees:
Aristidis Chris Soldatos (South Africa)
Owen Powell (Jamaica)
Fourth official:
Esfandiar Baharmast (United States)

=== Nigeria vs Paraguay ===
24 June 1998
21:00 CEST (UTC+2)

| Nigeria | 1–3 | Paraguay |
|---|---|---|
| Oruma 11' | | Ayala 1'; Benítez 58'; Cardozo 86' |

Stade de Toulouse, Toulouse
Attendance: 33,500
Referee: Pirom Un-prasert (Thailand)

| Nigeria | Paraguay |

| GK | 1 | Peter Rufai (c) |
| RB | 17 | Augustine Eguavoen | (yellow card) 25' |
| CB | 6 | Taribo West |
| CB | 16 | Uche Okafor |
| LB | 19 | Ben Iroha | (yellow card) 38' |
| RM | 13 | Tijani Babangida |
| CM | 15 | Sunday Oliseh | | (substituted off) 45' |
| CM | 18 | Wilson Oruma | | (substituted off) 68' |
| LM | 11 | Garba Lawal |
| CF | 9 | Rasheed Yekini |
| CF | 4 | Nwankwo Kanu |
Substitutions:
| DF | 21 | Godwin Okpara | | (substituted on) 45' |
| MF | 7 | Finidi George | | (substituted on) 68' |
Manager:
(Federal Republic of Yugoslavia) Bora Milutinović

| GK | 1 | José Luis Chilavert (c) |
| RB | 2 | Francisco Arce |
| CB | 4 | Carlos Gamarra |
| CB | 5 | Celso Ayala |
| LB | 11 | Pedro Sarabia |
| CM | 13 | Carlos Paredes |
| CM | 16 | Julio César Enciso |
| CM | 20 | Denis Caniza | (substituted off) 55' |
| RF | 17 | Hugo Brizuela | (substituted off) 77' |
| CF | 9 | José Cardozo |
| LF | 15 | Miguel Ángel Benítez | (substituted off) 67' |
Substitutions:
| MF | 7 | Julio César Yegros | (substituted on) 55' |
| MF | 10 | Roberto Acuña | (substituted on) 67' |
| FW | 8 | Arístides Rojas | (substituted on) 77' |
Manager:
(Brazil) Paulo César Carpegiani

Assistant referees:
Mohamed Al Musawi (Oman)
Mikael Nilsson (Sweden)
Fourth official:
Masayoshi Okada (Japan)

=== Spain vs Bulgaria ===
24 June 1998
21:00 CEST (UTC+2)

| Spain | 6–1 | Bulgaria |
|---|---|---|
| Hierro 6' (pen.); Luis Enrique 18'; Morientes 55', 81'; Bachev 88' (o.g.); Kiko 90+4' | | Kostadinov 58' |

Stade Félix-Bollaert, Lens
Attendance: 38,100
Referee: Mario van der Ende (Netherlands)

| Spain | Bulgaria |

| GK | 1 | Andoni Zubizarreta (c) |
| RB | 15 | Carlos Aguilera | (yellow card) 16' |
| CB | 20 | Miguel Ángel Nadal |
| CB | 4 | Rafael Alkorta |
| LB | 12 | Sergi |
| RM | 17 | Joseba Etxeberria | | (substituted off) 50' |
| CM | 6 | Fernando Hierro |
| CM | 18 | Guillermo Amor |
| LM | 21 | Luis Enrique | | (substituted off) 69' |
| SS | 11 | Alfonso | | (substituted off) 65' |
| CF | 7 | Fernando Morientes |
Substitutions:
| FW | 10 | Raúl | | (substituted on) 50' |
| FW | 19 | Kiko | | (substituted on) 65' |
| MF | 8 | Julen Guerrero | (yellow card) 73' | (substituted on) 69' |
Manager:
Javier Clemente

| GK | 1 | Zdravko Zdravkov |
| DF | 2 | Radostin Kishishev |
| DF | 3 | Trifon Ivanov (c) |
| DF | 5 | Ivaylo Yordanov |
| FW | 7 | Emil Kostadinov |
| FW | 8 | Hristo Stoichkov | | (substituted off) 45' |
| MF | 10 | Krasimir Balakov | | (substituted off) 61' |
| DF | 13 | Gosho Ginchev |
| MF | 16 | Anatoli Nankov | | (substituted off) 28' |
| MF | 18 | Daniel Borimirov |
| FW | 19 | Georgi Bachev | (yellow card) 85' |
Substitutions:
| FW | 9 | Lyuboslav Penev | (yellow card) 45' | (substituted on) 28' |
| MF | 11 | Ilian Iliev | | (substituted on) 45' |
| MF | 14 | Marian Hristov | | (substituted on) 61' |
Manager:
Hristo Bonev

Assistant referees:
Nicolae Grigorescu (Romania)
Claudio Rossi (Argentina)
Fourth official:
Nikolai Levnikov (Russia)

== See also ==
- Bulgaria at the FIFA World Cup
- Nigeria at the FIFA World Cup
- France at the FIFA World Cup
- Spain at the FIFA World Cup
