= Paraguay at the Copa América =

Paraguayan participation in the Copa Amèrica

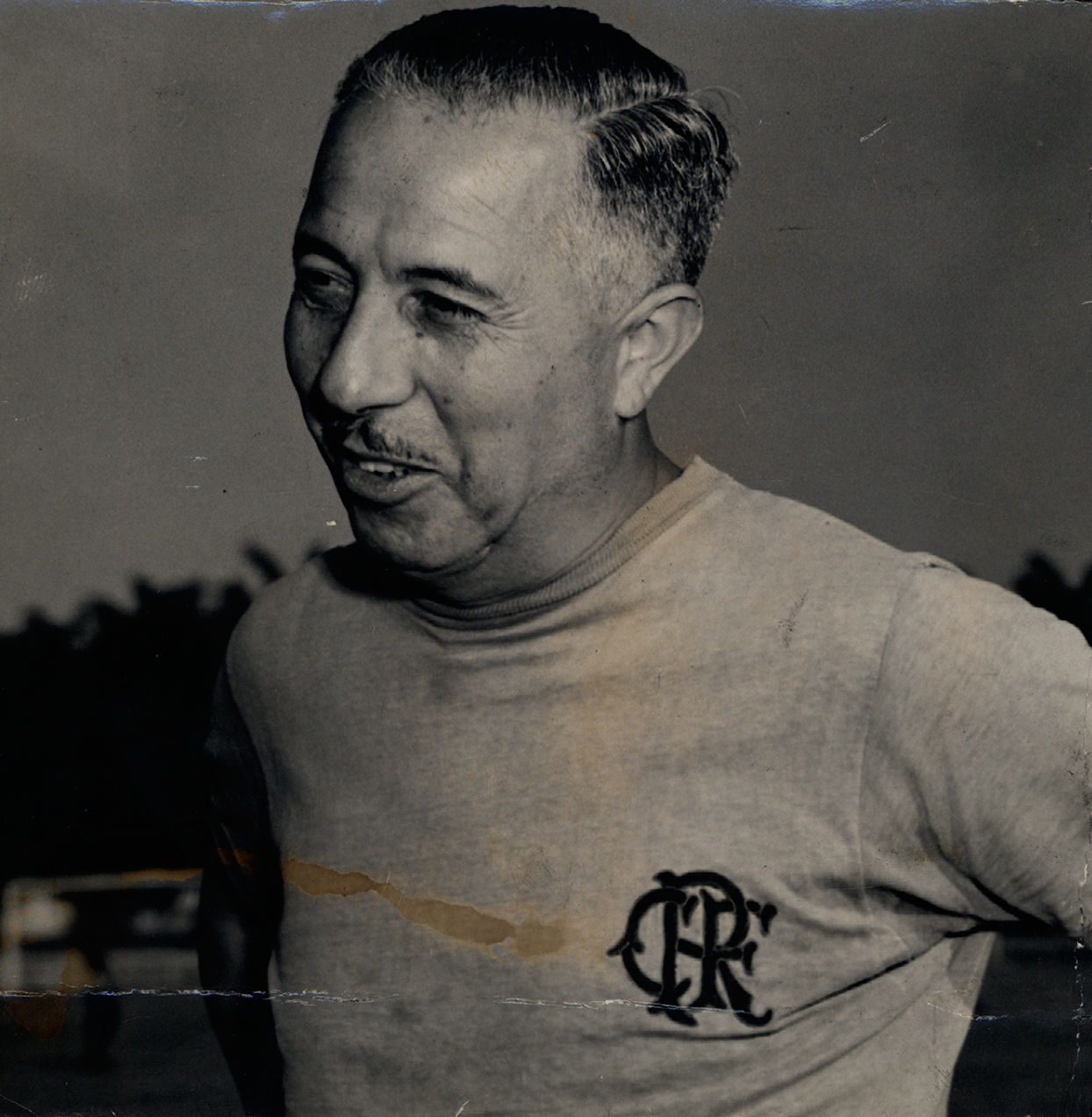
Midfielder Manuel Fleitas Solich appeared in five South American Championships in the 1920s as a player and led Paraguay to their first title in 1953 as coach.

The Copa América is South America's major tournament in senior men's football and determines the continental champion. Until 1967, the tournament was known as South American Championship. It is the oldest continental championship in the world.

Paraguay can historically be considered South America's 'Best of the Rest' as they are ranked fourth in the Copa Américas All-Time table behind CONMEBOL's big three: Argentina, Uruguay and Brazil.

However, Paraguay's most successful era continentally was in the late 1940s culminating in their first tournament victory in 1953 while in recent decades Paraguay produced mediocre results. Even the 'Golden Generation', which continually qualified and produced good results at the FIFA World Cups from 1998–2010, never advanced beyond the quarter-finals at a Copa América until reaching the final once in 2011.

== Overall record ==
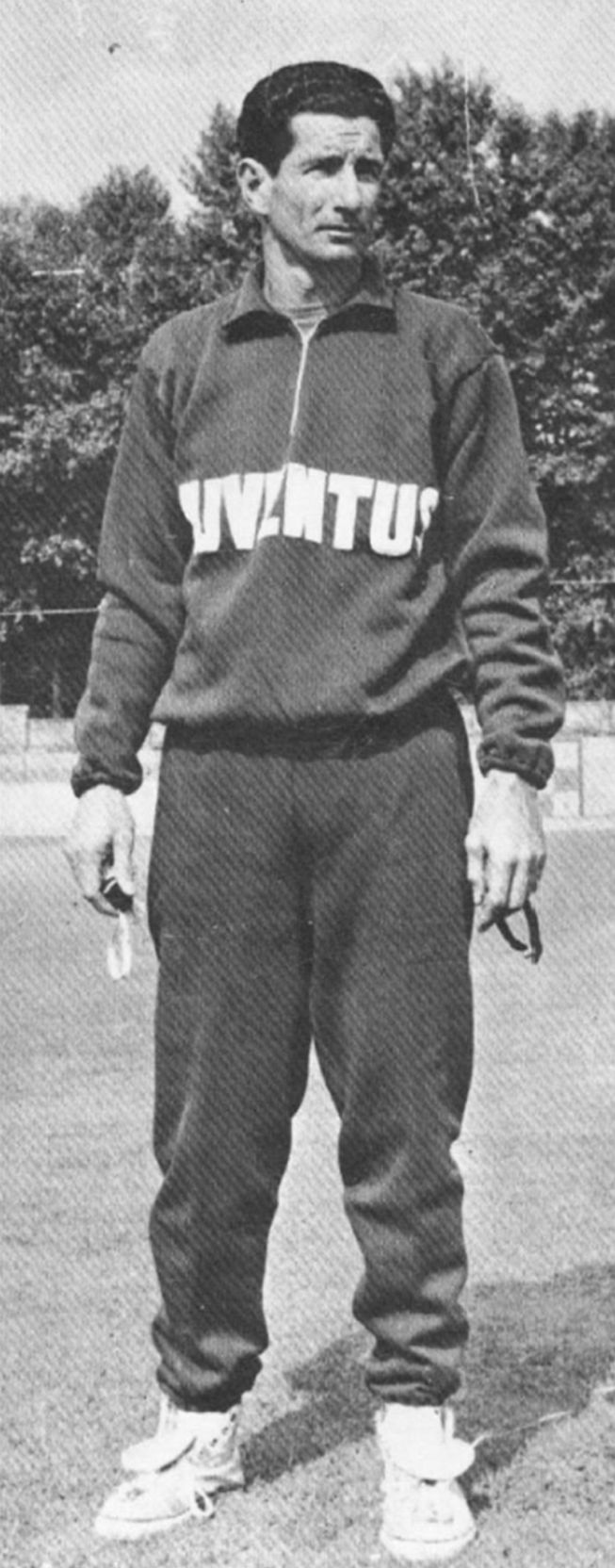
Defender Heriberto Herrera played an integral part of the 1953 tournament winning squad. He is the only Paraguayan to be honoured as player of the tournament.

South American Championship / Copa América record
Year	Round	Position	Pld	W	D*	L	GF	GA	Squad
(Argentina) 1916	Not a CONMEBOL member								
(Uruguay) 1917	Not a CONMEBOL member								
(Brazil) 1919	Not a CONMEBOL member								
(Chile) 1920	Not a CONMEBOL member								
(Argentina) 1921	Fourth place	4th	3	1	0	2	2	7	Squad
(Brazil) 1922	Runners-up	2nd	4	2	1	1	5	3	Squad
(Uruguay) 1923	Third place	3rd	3	1	0	2	4	6	Squad
(Uruguay) 1924	Third place	3rd	3	1	1	1	4	4	Squad
(Argentina) 1925	Third place	3rd	4	0	0	4	4	13	Squad
(Chile) 1926	Fourth place	4th	4	1	0	3	8	20	Squad
(Peru) 1927	Did not enter								
(Argentina) 1929	Runners-up	2nd	3	2	0	1	9	4	Squad
(Peru) 1935	Did not enter								
(Argentina) 1937	Fourth place	4th	5	2	0	3	8	16	Squad
(Peru) 1939	Third place	3rd	4	2	0	2	9	8	Squad
(Chile) 1941	Did not enter								
(Uruguay) 1942	Fourth place	4th	6	2	2	2	11	10	Squad
(Chile) 1945	Did not enter								
(Argentina) 1946	Third place	3rd	5	2	1	2	8	8	Squad
(Ecuador) 1947	Runners-up	2nd	7	5	1	1	16	11	Squad
(Brazil) 1949	Runners-up	2nd	8	6	0	2	21	13	Squad
(Peru) 1953	Champions	1st	7	4	2	1	14	8	Squad
(Chile) 1955	Fifth place	5th	5	1	1	3	7	14	Squad
(Uruguay) 1956	Fifth place	5th	5	0	2	3	3	8	Squad
(Peru) 1957	Did not enter								
(Argentina) 1959	Third place	3rd	6	3	0	3	12	12	Squad
(Ecuador) 1959	Fifth place	5th	4	0	1	3	6	11	Squad
(Bolivia) 1963	Runners-up	2nd	6	4	1	1	13	7	Squad
(Uruguay) 1967	Fourth place	4th	5	2	0	3	9	13	Squad
1975	Group stage	7th	4	1	1	2	5	5	Squad
1979	Champions	1st	6	3	3	0	9	3	Squad
1983	Third place	3rd	2	0	2	0	1	1	Squad
(Argentina) 1987	Group stage	9th	2	0	1	1	0	3	Squad
(Brazil) 1989	Fourth place	4th	7	3	1	3	9	10	Squad
(Chile) 1991	Group stage	6th	4	2	0	2	7	8	Squad
(Ecuador) 1993	Quarter-finals	8th	4	1	1	2	2	7	Squad
(Uruguay) 1995	Quarter-finals	6th	4	2	1	1	6	5	Squad
(Bolivia) 1997	Quarter-finals	7th	4	1	1	2	2	5	Squad
(Paraguay) 1999	Quarter-finals	6th	4	2	2	0	6	1	Squad
(Colombia) 2001	Group stage	10th	3	0	2	1	4	6	Squad
(Peru) 2004	Quarter-finals	5th	4	2	1	1	5	5	Squad
(Venezuela) 2007	Quarter-finals	5th	4	2	0	2	8	8	Squad
(Argentina) 2011	Runners-up	2nd	6	0	5	1	5	8	Squad
(Chile) 2015	Fourth place	4th	6	1	3	2	6	12	Squad
(United States) 2016	Group stage	12th	3	0	1	2	1	3	Squad
(Brazil) 2019	Quarter-finals	8th	4	0	3	1	3	4	Squad
(Brazil) 2021	Quarter-finals	6th	5	2	1	2	8	6	Squad
(United States) 2024	Group stage	14th	3	0	0	3	3	8	Squad
Total	2 Titles	39/48	180	64	43	73	267	311	—

* Includes a 2–2 draw awarded to Peru.

== Winning tournaments ==
=== 1953 South American Championship ===
After coach Manuel Fleitas Solich took charge of the Paraguay national team in 1947, he developed an already skillful team into title contestants. In 1947 and 1949, Los Guaraníes were consecutive vice-champions.

In 1949 and 1953 Paraguay was in the same situation before their last match of the group phase: Anything less than a win against Brazil would mean tournament victory for the opponent, while a win would force both teams into a play-off. Both times Paraguay won 2–1.

In the 1949 play-off, Brazil thrashed Paraguay 7–0 on home soil, taking revenge for the group match defeat along with tournament victory. In 1953 however, the Paraguayan's scored two early goals in the play-off, and led 3–0 by half-time, winning the match 3–2.

1 April 1953

Paraguay	3–2	Brazil
López 14'; Gavilán 17'; Fernández 41'		Baltazar 56', 65'

Estadio Nacional, Lima
Attendance: 35,000
Referee: Charles Dean (England)

=== 1979 Copa América ===
1979 was the second edition of a revised Copa América which was not held as a local tournament, but spread over several months in a number of home-and-away-matches. In the group phase, opponent Uruguay slipped up in their first match against Ecuador, losing 1–2, and were held at bay by Paraguay with two draws. A closely contested semi-final saw Paraguay win 4–3 on aggregate over Brazil.

The rules for the final against Chile were that a play-off on neutral ground was to be played if the teams were equal on points after two legs. Goal difference would only come into play if the play-off also ended in a draw. After a 3–0 home win, but a 1–0 away defeat, the play-off was scheduled in Buenos Aires six days later. Drawing 0–0, Paraguay won on aggregate goals after that play-off. In total, Paraguay had to play nine matches to be crowned champions, a tournament record tied with Peru, who went through a similar ordeal four years earlier.

11 December 1979

Paraguay	0–0	Chile

José Amalfitani, Buenos Aires
Attendance: 6,000
Referee: Arnaldo C. Coelho (Brazil)

== Record by opponent ==
Paraguay's highest victory at a Copa América was a 7–0 win against Bolivia in 1949. Their highest defeat was a 0–8 loss against Argentina in 1926.

Copa América matches (by team)
Opponent	W	D	L	Pld	GF	GA
Argentina	0	6	20	26	23	78
Bolivia	8	2	1	11	31	8
Brazil	7	11	14	32	31	65
Chile	13	2	7	22	38	31
Colombia	5	1	6	12	17	13
Costa Rica	1	1	1	3	2	2
Ecuador	9	3	3	15	26	15
Jamaica	1	0	0	1	1	0
Japan	1	0	0	1	4	0
Mexico	1	1	1	3	2	7
Peru	7	7	4	18	35	25
Qatar	0	1	0	1	2	2
United States	1	0	1	2	3	2
Uruguay	6	6	15	27	33	55
Venezuela	4	2	0	6	16	8
Total	64	43	73	180	267	311

== Record players ==
Rank	Player	Matches	Tournaments
1	Manuel Gavilán	20	1947, 1949 and 1953
1	Salvador Villalba	20	1955, 1956, 1959 (ARG) and 1959 (ECU)
3	Sinforiano García	19	1946, 1947 and 1949
3	Juan Torales	19	1979, 1983, 1987 and 1989
3	Carlos Gamarra	19	1993, 1995, 1997, 1999 and 2004
6	Gerardo Rivas	18	1921, 1922, 1923, 1924 and 1925
6	Manuel Fleitas Solich	18	1921, 1922, 1924, 1925 and 1926
6	Roberto Fernández	18	1979, 1983, 1987 and 1989
6	Roque Santa Cruz	18	1999, 2007, 2011 and 2015
6	Paulo da Silva	18	2007, 2011, 2015 and 2016

== Top goalscorers ==
Rank	Player	Goals	Tournaments (goals)
1	Juan Bautista Villalba	9	1946 (4) and 1947 (5)
2	Marcial Barrios	8	1939 (3), 1942 (3) and 1949 (2)
3	Gerardo Rivas	7	1921 (1), 1922 (2), 1923 (1), 1924 (1) and 1925 (2)
3	Aurelio González	7	1929 (5) and 1937 (2)
3	Dionisio Arce	7	1949
3	Jorge Duílio Benítez	7	1949
3	Maximo Rolón	7	1955 (5) and 1956 (2)
3	Roque Santa Cruz	7	1999 (3), 2007 (3) and 2011 (1)
9	Ildefonso López	6	1921 (1), 1922 (1), 1923 (1), 1924 (2) and 1926 (1)
9	Leocadio Marín	6	1947
9	José Aveiro	6	1959 (ARG)

== Awards and records ==
Team Awards

- Champions 2x (1953, 1979)
- Second Place 6x (1922, 1929, 1947, 1949, 1963, 2011)
- Third Place 7x (1923, 1924, 1925, 1939, 1959 (ARG), 1983)

Individual Awards

- Most Valuable Player 1953: Heriberto Herrera
- Top Scorer 1929: Aurelio González (5 goals)
- Top Scorer 1979: Eugenio Morel (4 goals) (shared)
- Best Goalkeeper 2011: Justo Villar

== See also ==
- Paraguay at the FIFA World Cup
