= Jorge Battaglia =

Paraguayan footballer (born 1960)

Personal information
- Full name: Jorge Antonio Battaglia Méndez
- Date of birth: 12 January 1960 (age 66)
- Place of birth: Asunción, Paraguay
- Height: 1.83 m (6 ft 0 in)
- Position: Goalkeeper

Senior career*
Years	Team	Apps	(Gls)
1980–1983	Sol de América		
1983	Bolívar		
1984–1986	Sol de América		
1986–1990	Estudiantes	48	(0)
1991–1996	Olimpia	26	(0)
1996	Alianza Lima	8	(0)
1998	Independiente Medellín		

International career
1985–1996	Paraguay	19	(0)
- * Club domestic league appearances and goals as of April 2008

Jorge Antonio Battaglia Méndez (born 12 January 1960) is a Paraguayan former football goalkeeper. He played his club football for Sol de América, Olimpia Asunción, Club Bolívar and Estudiantes de La Plata.

Battaglia was also part of the Paraguay national football team that participated in the 1986 FIFA World Cup, where he was the substitute of starting goalkeeper Roberto Fernández.
