= Luis Vargas Peña =

Paraguayan footballer (1905–1994)

Personal information
- Full name: Luis Vargas Peña
- Date of birth: 1905
- Place of birth: Asunción, Paraguay
- Date of death: 1994 (aged 88–89)
- Position: Forward

International career
Years	Team	Apps	(Gls)
- Paraguay

Luis Vargas Peña (1905 in Asunción–1994) was one of the greatest Paraguayan footballers (wingers) before the Second World War. He was the first Paraguayan to score a goal for the Paraguay national football team in a FIFA World Cup, accomplishing that in a match valid for the group stage of the 1930 FIFA World Cup against Belgium, played on 20 July. Vargas Peña also had the honour of being the first captain for Paraguay in a World Cup.

During most of his career he played for the club Olimpia Asunción.

== International goals ==
Paraguay's goal tally first

#	Date	Venue	Opponent	Score	Result	Competition
1.	3 November 1926	Estadio Sport de Ñuñoa, Santiago, Chile	Chile	1–5	1–5	1926 South American Championship
2.	20 July 1930	Estadio Centenario, Montevideo, Uruguay	Belgium	1–0	1–0	1930 FIFA World Cup

== Sources ==
- A.Gowarzewski : "FUJI Football Encyclopedia. World Cup FIFA*part I*Biographical Notes – Heroes of Mundials"; GiA Katowice 1993
- http://fifaworldcup.yahoo.com/06/en/w/pwc/mr_1089.html
- http://www.cbc.ca/sports/soccer/teams/paraguay.html
