= Arístides Rojas =

Paraguayan footballer (born 1970)

Personal information
- Full name: Arístides Fabián Rojas Aranda
- Date of birth: 12 August 1968 (age 58)
- Place of birth: Limpio, Paraguay
- Height: 1.78 m (5 ft 10 in)
- Position: Forward

Senior career*
Years	Team	Apps	(Gls)
1989	Colegiales		
1990–1991	Lens	8	(1)
1991–1992	Dunkerque	26	(9)
1992–1993	Châteauroux	33	(6)
1993–1995	Denderleeuw	25	(8)
1994	→ Colegiales (loan)		
1995	Luqueño		
1995–1996	Guaraní	16	(16)
1997	Las Palmas	16	(2)
1997	Independiente	11	(2)
1998	Unión de Santa Fe	13	(1)
2000	Alianza Lima		
2001–2003	Sol de América		
2003–2004	Guabirá		
2004	Guaraní-AF	2	(0)
2005–2006	General Caballero	15	(0)
2006	Trinidense		
2007	Rubio Ñú		
2008	General Díaz		

International career
1989–1998	Paraguay	28	(3)
- * Club domestic league appearances and goals

Arístides Fabián Rojas Aranda (born 1 August 1970) is a Paraguayan former footballer who played as a striker.

He represented Paraguay at the 1998 FIFA World Cup. At club level he played for Club Guaraní, Olimpia Asunción, Club Atlético Colegiales (all from Paraguay), Aalst (Belgium), RC Lens (France), Independiente and Unión de Santa Fe (Argentina).

Rojas was the Paraguayan 1st Division top goalscorer in 1996, playing for Guarani.
