= Julio César Yegros =

Paraguayan footballer (born 1971)

Personal information
- Full name: Julio César Yegros Torres
- Date of birth: 31 January 1971 (age 55)
- Place of birth: Luque, Paraguay
- Height: 1.75 m (5 ft 9 in)
- Position: Forward

Senior career*
Years	Team	Apps	(Gls)
1990–1992	Sportivo Luqueño		
1992–1993	Deportivo Mandiyú	5	(0)
1994	Cerro Porteño		
1994–1995	Deportes Tolima		
1995–2000	Cruz Azul	67	(21)
1996–1997	Cruz Azul Hidalgo	15	(6)
1997	→ Tecos UAG (loan)	16	(4)
1999	→ Olimpia Asunción (loan)		
2001–2002	Pumas UNAM	51	(20)
2002	→ Monterrey (loan)	15	(3)
2002	→ Chiapas (loan)	15	(5)
2003	→ Club León (loan)	23	(17)
2003–2004	Querétaro	29	(3)
2004–2005	Atlético Celaya	15	(3)
2005	Sportivo Luqueño	14	(5)
2005–2006	Club León	8	(0)
2006	Lagartos de Tabasco	14	(0)
2007–2008	General Díaz		

International career
1992	Paraguay U23		
1991–2000	Paraguay	15	(0)
- * Club domestic league appearances and goals as of May 2009

Julio César Yegros Torres (born 31 January 1971) is a former Paraguayan footballer that played as a striker. His older brother Cirilo Yegros (born 1969) also played professional football (soccer).

== Club career ==
At club level, Yegros played for teams like Cerro Porteño, Olimpia Asunción and Sportivo Luqueño of Paraguay; Cruz Azul, Tecos UAG and Pumas UNAM, Chiapas and Club León of Mexico; Mandiyú of Argentina and Deportes Tolima of Colombia.

Yegros spent most of his career playing in Mexico. He signed with Pumas, but after begin loaned to Club León, he was transferred to Querétaro F.C. in June 2003.

== International career ==
Yegros made his international debut for the Paraguay national football team on 14 June 1991 in a friendly match against Bolivia (1-0 win). He obtained a total number of 15 international caps, scoring no goals for the national side. He represented Paraguay at the 1998 FIFA World Cup.
