= Ian McLeod (referee) =

South African football referee

- Born: 5 March 1954; South Africa
- Died: 26 October 2017 (aged 63)
- Other occupation: School headmaster

International
Years	League	Role
1993–1999	FIFA	Referee

Ian McLeod (5 March 1954 – 26 October 2017) was a South African football referee. His other occupation was as a headmaster in school teaching.

== Career ==
He became a FIFA referee in 1993. In 1996, he was selected for the African Nations Cup in South Africa, controlling only one game, the 2–0 win by Algeria over Sierra Leone on 18 January 1996.

He handled two matches in the 1997 FIFA Confederations Cup - Saudi Arabia versus Mexico on 14 December 1997, and Brazil against Mexico on 16 December 1997.

McLeod took charge of two matches in the 1998 African Nations Cup in Burkina Faso - the game between Ghana and Tunisia on 9 February 1998, and the encounter involving Ivory Coast and Egypt on 21 February 1998.

He was appointed to officiate in the 1998 FIFA World Cup in France, and took control of just one match, the 0–0 draw in Group D on 19 June 1998 between Spain and Paraguay, played at Stade Geoffroy-Guichard, Saint-Étienne.

After his retirement from active refereeing, he assisted the Council of Southern Africa Football Associations (COSAFA) as a Match commissioner, overseeing the COSAFA Castle Cup Group C semi-final between Botswana and Namibia in July 2007. He was also chairman of the South African Football Association Technical Committee.

A few years after his retirement he joined Crawford Preparatory Pretoria where he was the principal and died on Thursday 26 October 2017.
