= Alfredo Mendoza =

Paraguayan footballer (born 1963)

Personal information
- Full name: Alfredo Damián Mendoza Sulewski
- Date of birth: 12 December 1963 (age 62)
- Place of birth: Encarnación, Paraguay
- Height: 1.72 m (5 ft 8 in)
- Position: Forward

Senior career*
Years	Team	Apps	(Gls)
1983–1986	Cerro Porteño		
1986	Independiente Medellín		
1986	Olimpia		
1987	Deportivo Cali	7	(0)
1988–1989	Olimpia	13	(3)
1989–1991	Stade Brest	21	(0)
1991–1992	Textil Mandiyú	36	(8)
1992–1994	Newell's Old Boys	30	(6)
1994–1995	Atlas		
1995	Newell's Old Boys		
1996	Olimpia	4	(0)

International career
1983–1993	Paraguay	43	(9)
- * Club domestic league appearances and goals

Alfredo Damián Mendoza Sulewski (born 12 December 1963 in Encarnación) is a retired football striker from Paraguay. A player of Cerro Porteño he was a member of the national team that competed at the 1986 FIFA World Cup in Mexico. At the club level he also played for Olimpia Asunción, Mandiyú and Newell's Old Boys of Argentina and Club Atlas of Mexico.

== Career ==
Born in Encarnación, Paraguay, Mendoza began playing football in local Club Silvio Pettirossi's youth system. He moved to Asunción, where he briefly played senior football with Club Atlético Tembetary and Club Guaraní, before signing with Cerro Porteño.

In 1986, Mendoza moved to Colombia where he would play for Independiente Medellín and Deportivo Cali. After spells with local side Club Olimpia and France's Stade Brestois 29, he spent most of the remainder of his career in Argentina with Textil Mandiyú and Newell's Old Boys.

== Career statistics ==
=== International ===
Appearances and goals by national team and year
National team	Year	Apps	Goals
Paraguay	1983	8	0
Paraguay	1985	14	3
Paraguay	1986	5	0
Paraguay	1989	8	3
Paraguay	1993	7	3
Total		42	9

Scores and results list Paraguay's goal tally first, score column indicates score after each Mendoza goal.

List of international goals scored by Alfredo Mendoza
No.	Date	Venue	Opponent	Score	Result	Competition	Ref.
1	19 April 1985	Estadio El Campín, Bogotá, Colombia	Colombia	1–0	2–2	Friendly	
2	28 April 1985	Estadio Defensores del Chaco, Asunción, Paraguay	Argentina	1–0	1–0	Friendly	
3	9 June 1985	Estadio Defensores del Chaco, Asunción, Paraguay	Bolivia	1–0	3–0	1986 FIFA World Cup qualification	
4	1 July 1989	Estádio Fonte Nova, Salvador, Brazil	Peru	3–1	5–2	1989 Copa América	
5	5 July 1989	Estádio Fonte Nova, Salvador, Brazil	Colombia	1–0	1–0	1989 Copa América	
6	17 September 1989	Estadio Metropolitano, Barranquilla, Colombia	Colombia	1–0	1–2	1990 FIFA World Cup qualification	
7	15 August 1993	Estadio Defensores del Chaco, Asunción, Paraguay	Peru	1–0	2–1	1994 FIFA World Cup qualification	
8	5 September 1993	National Stadium of Peru, Lima, Peru	Peru	1–1	2–2	1994 FIFA World Cup qualification	
9	5 September 1993	National Stadium of Peru, Lima, Peru	Peru	2–2	2–2	1994 FIFA World Cup qualification	
