= Raad Hammoudi =

Iraqi footballer

Raad Hammoudi Salman
Personal information
- Full name: Raad Hammoudi Salman AL dulaimi
- Date of birth: 1 May 1953 (age 73)
- Place of birth: Baghdad, Iraq
- Position: Goalkeeper

Senior career*
Years	Team	Apps	(Gls)
1972–1974	Kuliya Al-Shorta		
1974–1987	Al-Shorta		(2)

International career
1976–1987	Iraq	104	(0)
- * Club domestic league appearances and goals

Raad Hammoudi Salman al-Aredhi (Arabic: رَعْد حَمُّودِيّ سَلْمَان الْعَارِضِيّ; born 1 May 1953) is a retired Iraqi football player who represented his country as a goalkeeper in the Olympics and the World Cup. He is known as the most successful goalkeeper in Iraqi football, leading Iraq to the 1986 FIFA World Cup. He made his international debut in 1976 against Turkey. Raad was an important part of the Al-Shorta side, captaining them to the Iraqi League in season 1979/80. He took three penalties for Al-Shorta, scoring two and missing one. He was goalkeeper of the tournament during Iraq's win in the 1979 Gulf Cup, when he conceded just one goal in six games, he was also in goal when Iraq won the Asian Games in 1982. Raad started his career in 1972 when he joined second division club Kuliya Al-Shurta (where he won the Iraqi Central Second Division), a team which along with Shurta Al-Najda and Aliyat Al-Shorta were replaced in the top-flight by Al-Shurta Sports Club.

Raad played in the 1984 Olympics and 1986 World Cup in Mexico, where he played in the two games against Paraguay and Belgium. In 1999, Raad was placed by the German-based Federation of Football History & Statistics (IFFHS) as Iraq's 4th best player of the century behind the likes of Ahmed Radhi, Hussein Saeed and Habib Jafar.

He was the head of the National Olympic Committee of Iraq during 2009-2024.

== See also ==
- List of men's footballers with 100 or more international caps
