= Jorge Amado Nunes =

Paraguayan football player and manager (born 1961)

Personal information
- Full name: Jorge Amado Nunes Infrán
- Date of birth: 18 October 1961 (age 65)
- Place of birth: Berazategui, Argentina
- Height: 1.74 m (5 ft 8 1/2 in)
- Position: Midfielder

Youth career
- Vélez Sársfield

Senior career*
| Years | Team | Apps | (Gls) |
| 1979–1984 | Cerro Porteño | | |
| 1984–1986 | Deportivo Cali | | |
| 1986–1987 | Elche CF | | |
| 1987–1988 | Vélez Sársfield | 25 | (2) |
| 1989–1991 | Deportivo Cali | | |
| 1992–1993 | Club Libertad | | |
| 1993–1995 | Universitario de Deportes | | (24) |
| 1996–1997 | Chaco For Ever | | |

International career
| 1985–1993 | Paraguay | 30 | (1) |
- * Club domestic league appearances and goals as of April 2008

Jorge Amado Nunes Infrán (born 18 October 1961) is a Paraguayan football manager and former player. He played as a midfielder and has been a member of the Paraguay national team.

== Club career ==
Nicknamed "El Cenizo", Nunes played in several teams in his career such as Libertad, Cerro Porteño, Vélez Sársfield, Deportivo Cali, Universitario de Deportes and Elche CF. Nunes spent his best years as a footballer in Deportivo Cali and Universitario of Peru, where he is considered one of the most emblematic players in their history.

== International career ==
Born in Argentina to Paraguayan parents, Nunes has dual citizenship. He was part of the Paraguay national football team that competed in the 1986 World Cup in Mexico.

== Managerial career ==
In his coaching career, Nunes worked with several Colombian teams such as Deportivo Cali, América de Cali and Millonarios. He was the assistant coach of José Hernández, who was in charge of the Panama national football team during the 2006 World Cup qualification. He also coached Universitario de Deportes in the season 2006/2007 terminating his contract by mutual agreement with the chairmen on 15 February 2007. "Crema" fans will always remember him as one of the best players the club ever had.
