= Ramón Hicks =

Paraguayan footballer (born 1959)

Personal information
- Full name: Ramón Angel María Hicks Cáceres
- Date of birth: 30 May 1959 (age 67)
- Place of birth: Asunción, Paraguay
- Height: 1.74 m (5 ft 9 in)
- Position: Forward

Senior career*
Years	Team	Apps	(Gls)
1980–1985	Libertad		
1985	Nacional		
1985	Libertad		
1986–1987	Sabadell	26	(7)
1987–1990	Oviedo	79	(17)
1990–1991	Elche	8	(1)
1991	Manchester United	0	(0)
1991–1992	Independiente	11	(1)
1992	Cerro Porteño		
1993	San José		

International career
1983–1987	Paraguay	37	(6)
- * Club domestic league appearances and goals

Ramón Angel María Hicks Cáceres (born 30 May 1959) is a Paraguayan former football winger. A well travelled player at club level he played for teams in his homeland (Club Libertad), Uruguay (Nacional), Spain (CE Sabadell FC, Real Oviedo and Elche CF), Argentina (Independiente) and Bolivia (Club San José). He appeared as an international for Paraguay and was a part of the squad for the 1986 FIFA World Cup. Altogether, he made 37 appearances for the national team, scoring six goals.
