= Carlos Morales (footballer, born 1968) =

Paraguayan footballer

Personal information
- Full name: Carlos Leonardo Morales Santos
- Date of birth: 4 November 1968 (age 57)
- Place of birth: Asunción, Paraguay
- Height: 1.78 m (5 ft 10 in)
- Position: Attacking midfielder

Youth career
- Guaraní

Senior career*
Years	Team	Apps	(Gls)
1985–1988	Guaraní		
1988–1991	Independiente		
1991–1992	Universidad de Chile		
1993	Gimnasia La Plata	11	(1)
1993–1994	Newell's Old Boys	6	(1)
1995–1999	Gimnasia Jujuy	129	(34)
1999–2001	Colón Santa Fe	52	(2)
2002	Tampico Madero	18	(5)
2002–2003	Gimnasia Jujuy	37	(5)
2003–2004	Racing Córdoba		
2004–2006	San Martín Tucumán		
2006	Central Norte		

International career
1997–1998	Paraguay	7	(0)
- * Club domestic league appearances and goals

Carlos Leonardo Morales Santos (born 4 November 1968) is a Paraguayan retired footballer who played mainly as an attacking midfielder.

== Football career ==
Having started with local Club Guaraní in 1985, Morales played most of his career in Argentina, appearing for eight different clubs in that country (11 overall) and retiring in 2006 at the age of 38. He represented Paraguay at the 1998 FIFA World Cup, playing the first half of the 0–0 group stage draw against Bulgaria and gaining a total of seven caps in one year, since making his debut in 1997 (aged 29).

He is the older brother of another footballer – and midfielder – Argentine Ángel Matute Morales. Both played for Club Atlético Independiente, but in separate spells.
