= Denis Caniza =

Paraguayan footballer (born 1974)

Personal information
- Full name: Denis Ramón Caniza Acuña
- Date of birth: 29 August 1974 (age 52)
- Place of birth: Bella Vista, Paraguay
- Height: 1.74 m (5 ft 8 1/2 in)
- Position: Full back

Senior career*
Years	Team	Apps	(Gls)
1994–1999	Olimpia Asunción	97	(3)
1999–2001	Lanús	61	(1)
2001–2005	Santos Laguna	191	(8)
2005–2008	Cruz Azul	51	(0)
2006–2007	→ Atlas (loan)	39	(1)
2008–2009	Olimpia Asunción	35	(0)
2009	Nacional Asunción	20	(0)
2010–2011	León	35	(2)
2011	Nacional Asunción	20	(0)
2011	Irapuato	15	(1)
2012	Nacional Asunción	19	(1)
2013	Sportivo Luqueño	33	(0)
2014	Rubio Ñu	32	(2)
Total		648	(19)

International career
1996–2010	Paraguay	100	(1)
- * Club domestic league appearances and goals

Denis Ramón Caniza Acuña (born 29 August 1974) is a Paraguayan former footballer who played as a defender.

== Career ==
Born in Bella Vista, Amambay, Caniza started his career in Olimpia of Paraguay. He also played in Lanús of Argentina, Santos Laguna, Atlas, Cruz Azul, Leon, and Irapuato of Mexico.

Caniza was a regular in the Paraguay national football team because of his versatility, as he can play as a side defender or as a centre-back. After the 2006 FIFA World Cup, Caniza announced his retirement from the Paraguay national team. However, when coach Gerardo Martino took the helm of the national team Caniza was called back and accepted to return to play for Paraguay. After Gerardo Martino took the head coach job in the Paraguay national football team, Caniza was voted for his teammates to become the captain of the team, so every time he played (when he was not injured or suspended) he captained the Paraguay national football team.

Caniza holds the distinction as the only Paraguayan footballer to be selected for four FIFA World Cup Finals, having been chosen in 1998, 2002, 2006 and 2010.

Due to his small size and industrial play, he has been described by BBC South American reporter Tim Vickery as "the Paraguayan Nobby Stiles".

In December 2014, Caniza announced his retirement at the age of 40 and his intention to have wanted to retire at Olimpia Asunción.

== Career statistics ==
=== International goals ===
#	Date	Venue	Opponent	Score	Result	Competition
1.	14 March 1998	Qualcomm Stadium, San Diego, California, USA	United States	2–2	Draw	Friendly

== Honours ==
Olimpia

- Paraguayan Primera División (4): 1995, 1997, 1998, 1999

Santos Laguna

- Mexican Primera División (1): 2001 Verano
- InterLiga (1): 2004

Nacional

- Paraguayan Primera División (1): 2009 Clausura

== See also ==
- List of men's footballers with 100 or more international caps
