= Vladimiro Schettina =

Paraguayan footballer (born 1955)

Vladimiro Schetina
Personal information
- Full name: Wladimiro Schetina Chepini
- Date of birth: 8 October 1955 (age 71)
- Place of birth: Asunción, Paraguay
- Height: 1.85 m (6 ft 1 in)
- Position: Defender

Senior career*
Years	Team	Apps	(Gls)
1975–1990	Club Guaraní	348	(13)

International career
1979–1986	Paraguay	26	(2)
- * Club domestic league appearances and goals as of April 2008

Vladimiro Schetina Chepini (born 8 October 1955, in Asunción) is a Paraguayan former football defender. He played his club football for Club Guaraní and was also a regular international for his country, appearing in the 1986 FIFA World Cup.

== International ==
Schettina made his international debut for the Paraguay national football team on 17 May 1979 in a friendly match against Brazil (6-0 loss). He obtained a total number of 26 international caps, scoring two goals for the national side.
