= César Zabala =

Paraguayan footballer (1961–2020)

Personal information
- Full name: César Zabala Fernández
- Date of birth: 3 June 1961
- Place of birth: Luque, Paraguay
- Date of death: 31 January 2020 (aged 58)
- Height: 1.81 m (5 ft 11 in)
- Position: Central defender

Senior career*
Years	Team	Apps	(Gls)
1982–1984	Sportivo Luqueño		
1985–1987	Cerro Porteño		
1988–1989	Atlético Talleres		
1989	Cerro Porteño		
1989	Internacional		
1990–1991	Cerro Porteño		

International career
1985–1991	Paraguay	49	(3)
- * Club domestic league appearances and goals

César Zabala Fernández (3 June 1961 – 31 January 2020) was a Paraguayan football (soccer) defender. He played professional football in Paraguay for Cerro Porteño, and had short spells in Argentina with Talleres de Córdoba and in Brazil with Sport Club Internacional.

== Career ==
Zabala was born in Luque, Paraguay, and played professionally for Sportivo Luqueño and Cerro Porteño.

== International ==
Zabala made his international debut for the Paraguay national football team on 3 February 1985 in a friendly match against Uruguay (1-0 loss) in Montevideo. A participant at the 1986 FIFA World Cup in Mexico, Zabala held 49 international caps and scored three goals for the national side.
