= Godwin Okpara =

Nigerian footballer

Personal information
- Date of birth: 20 September 1972 (age 54)
- Place of birth: Ogbaku, Nigeria
- Height: 1.76 m (5 ft 9 in)
- Position: Defender

Senior career*
Years	Team	Apps	(Gls)
1989	Obanta United		
1989–1991	Beerschot	21	(0)
1991–1996	Eendracht Aalst	94	(1)
1996–1999	Strasbourg	96	(6)
1999–2001	Paris Saint-Germain	19	(0)
2001–2004	Standard Liège	67	(1)

International career
2000	Nigeria Olympic (O.P.)	4	(0)
1991–2001	Nigeria	18	(0)
- * Club domestic league appearances and goals

Godwin Okpara (born 20 September 1972) is a Nigerian former professional footballer who played as a defender. He was part of the Nigeria national team squads that participated in the 1998 FIFA World Cup, 2000 Africa Cup of Nations and the 2000 Summer Olympics.

== Club career ==
Okpara was Imo State-born defender, after playing for AGIP FC of Lagos and Obanta United began his foreign professional stint in Belgium in 1989 with Beerschot. After some years of relative success playing for Eendracht Aalst, including winning the Belgian Ebony Shoe, he moved to play in France for RC Strasbourg and Paris Saint-Germain. While at Strasbourg he won the Coupe de la Ligue in 1997, playing in the final. His second season with PSG was miserable, making him return to Belgium and Standard Liège. Okpara retired after the 2003–04 season.

== International career ==
Okpara represented the Nigeria national under-17 team at the 1989 FIFA U-16 World Championship, held in Scotland in 1989. He impressed with his defensive performances during the tournament and was described by Brazilian footballer Pelé as a promising young player.

On 13 January 1991, Okpara made his debut for the Nigeria national football team in a match against Burkina Faso.

In 1998, Okpara participated in the 1998 FIFA World Cup. He came on as a substitute in Nigeria's group-stage matches against Spain and Paraguay. Nigeria advanced from the group stage but were eliminated in the round of 16 after losing 4–1 to Denmark.

In January 2000, Okpara participated in the 2000 African Cup of Nations. Nigeria advanced from the group stage and reached the final after defeating Senegal in the quarter-finals and South Africa in the semi-finals. However, the final ended in a 2–2 draw against Cameroon, with Nigeria losing in the penalty shoot-out and finishing as runners-up.

Later that year, Okpara captained the Nigeria Olympic team at the 2000 Summer Olympics. Nigeria advanced from the group stage but were eliminated in the quarter-finals after losing 4–1 to Chile.

== Prison ==
In August 2005, Okpara was arrested by French police on charges of raping his 13-year-old adopted daughter, Awawu Tina. He was found guilty and imprisoned in June 2007 for thirteen years, but his sentence was reduced to seven years due a successful appeal. His wife, Linda Okpara, was sentenced to 15 years in jail for torture of the same girl. In November 2017, he was arraigned in an Ikeja Magistrate Court for allegedly battering his wife of 25 years.
