= Celso Ayala =

Paraguayan footballer (born 1970)

Personal information
- Full name: Celso Rafael Ayala Gavilán
- Date of birth: 20 August 1970 (age 56)
- Place of birth: Asunción, Paraguay
- Height: 1.83 m (6 ft 0 in)
- Position: Centre-back

Team information
- Current team: Cajamarca (manager)

Senior career*
Years	Team	Apps	(Gls)
1990–1994	Olimpia Asunción		
1994	Rosario Central	15	(0)
1995–1998	River Plate	140	(8)
1998–1999	Betis	17	(1)
1999–2000	Atlético Madrid	19	(1)
2000	São Paulo	8	(0)
2001–2005	River Plate	60	(3)
2006	Colo-Colo	6	(0)

International career
1992	Paraguay U-23		
1993–2003	Paraguay	85	(6)

Managerial career
- 2012–2013: Carapeguá
- 2014: Independiente FBC
- 2014–2015: Guabirá
- 2015: Sport Boys Warnes
- 2015: Petrolero
- 2016–2017: Independiente FBC
- 2017–2018: Nacional Asunción
- 2019: Deportivo Capiatá
- 2019–2020: Sportivo Luqueño
- 2020: River Plate Asunción
- 2020–2021: Sol de América
- 2021: River Plate Asunción
- 2022: Sol de América
- 2023: Deportivo Santaní
- 2024: Rubio Ñu
- 2025: River Plate Asunción
- 2026–: Cajamarca
- * Club domestic league appearances and goals

Celso Rafael Ayala Gavilán (locally [ˈselso rafaˈel aˈʝala ɣaβiˈlan]; born 20 August 1970) is a Paraguayan football manager and former player who played as a centre-back. He is the current manager of Peruvian club Cajamarca.

== Career ==
With 85 caps and six goals, Ayala one of the most capped players in the Paraguay national team. Ayala became a key player in Paraguay's outstanding defensive line in the 1990s, along with fellow defenders Francisco Arce and Carlos Gamarra. His characteristics were leadership in the field, good positioning and superb tackling and heading skills. Ayala made his international debut for the Paraguay national football team on 3 March 1993 in the Copa Paz de Chico match against Bolivia (1–0 win) as a substitute.

== Honours ==
Olimpia Asunción

- Nehru Cup: 1990
- Supercopa Sudamericana: 1990
- Copa Libertadores de America: 1990
- Copa Interamericana runner-up: 1990
- Intercontinental Cup runner-up: 1990
- Recopa Sudamericana: 1991
- Torneo Republica: 1992 (undefeated)
- Copa CONMEBOL runner-up: 1992
- Paraguayan league: 1993 (undefeated)
- Supercopa Masters runner-up: 1994

River Plate

- Copa Libertadores: 1996
- Primera División Argentina: Apertura 1996, Clausura, 1997, Apertura 1997, Clausura 2002, Clausura 2003, Clausura 2004
- Intercontinental Cup runner-up: 1996
- Supercopa Sudamericana: 1997

Real Betis

- Ramon de Carranza Trophy: 1999

Colo-Colo

- Torneo Apertura: 2006

Paraguay U-23

- U-23 South American championship: 1992
