= Buenaventura Ferreira =

Paraguayan footballer (born 1960)

Personal information
- Full name: Buenaventura Ferreira Gómez
- Date of birth: 4 July 1960 (age 66)
- Place of birth: Coronel Oviedo, Paraguay
- Height: 1.75 m (5 ft 9 in)
- Position: Midfielder

Team information
- Current team: Guaraní (youth manager)

Senior career*
Years	Team	Apps	(Gls)
1977	Guaraní Kaaby		
1978–1981	Coronel Oviedo		
1982	Rubio Ñu		
1982	→ Tembetary (loan)		
1983	Cerro Porteño		
1984–1985	Guaraní		
1985–1986	Deportivo Cali		
1986–1987	Sabadell	29	(2)
1987–1988	Vélez Sarsfield	30	(2)
1989	Guaraní		
1990	Libertad		
1990	Cerro Porteño		
1991	Cerro Corá		
1991–1992	Oriente Petrolero		
1992	Sol de América		
1993	Guaraní		
1993	Colón	11	(0)
1994	Deportivo Quito		
1994–1995	Libertad		
1996	Sport Colombia		
1996	Humaitá		
1996–1997	Oriente Petrolero		
1997	Sportivo San Lorenzo		

International career
1985–1993	Paraguay	44	(7)

Managerial career
- 1998–1999: Independiente FBC
- 2000–2003: Guaraní (youth)
- 2004: Sport Colombia
- 2005: Sportivo San Lorenzo
- 2006: Guaraní
- 2006–2007: Sol de América
- 2008: Oriente Petrolero
- 2009: Deportivo Caaguazú
- 2010: Real Mamoré
- 2011: Guaraní (assistant)
- 2012: Independiente FBC
- 2014: Sport Colombia
- 2015–2016: Royal Pari
- 2017: Real Santa Cruz
- 2018–: Guaraní (youth)
- 2023: Guaraní (interim)
- * Club domestic league appearances and goals

Buenaventura Ferreira Gómez (born 4 July 1960) is a Paraguayan football manager and former player who played as a striker or midfielder. He is the current manager of Guaraní's youth setup.

Ferreira played his club football for Club Guaraní, Deportivo Cali of Colombia, Spain's CE Sabadell FC and Bolivian side Oriente Petrolero. He also played in Argentina for Vélez Sársfield and Colón de Santa Fe. Ferreira appeared as an international for Paraguay on several occasions, and was part of the squad that participated in the 1986 FIFA World Cup.
