= Cayetano Ré =

Paraguayan footballer and coach (1938–2013)

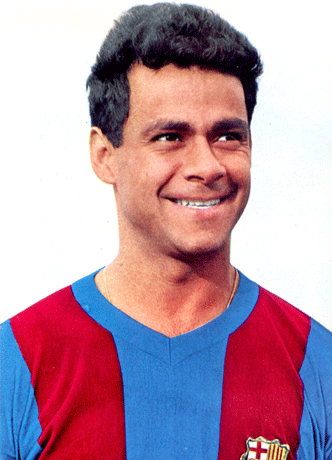

Personal information
- Full name: Cayetano Ré Ramírez
- Date of birth: 7 February 1938
- Place of birth: Asunción, Paraguay
- Date of death: 26 November 2013 (aged 75)
- Place of death: Elche, Valencia, Spain
- Height: 1.63 m (5 ft 4 in)
- Position: Striker

Senior career*
Years	Team	Apps	(Gls)
1958–1959	Cerro Porteño		
1959–1962	Elche	79	(25)
1962–1966	Barcelona	84	(56)
1966–1971	Espanyol	102	(23)
1971–1972	Terrassa		

International career
1958–1959	Paraguay	25	(?)

Managerial career
- 1973–1974: Eldense
- 1974–1975: Almería
- 1975–1978: Eldense
- 1978–1980: Onteniente
- 1981–1982: Córdoba
- 1983–1984: Elche
- 1984: Guaraní
- 1985: Cerro Porteño
- 1985–1987: Paraguay
- 1987–1988: Necaxa
- 1989: Betis
- 1992: Deportes Temuco
- 1994: Deportivo Wanka
- 1996: Cerro Porteño
- 1999: Ceuta
- 2000: Guaraní
- * Club domestic league appearances and goals

Cayetano Ré Ramírez (7 February 1938 – 26 November 2013) was a Paraguayan professional football player and manager.

== Career ==
=== Club ===
A forward, Ré began his career in Asunción, playing for Cerro Porteño before signing for Spanish side Elche CF in 1959. After three seasons with Elche, Ré was signed by FC Barcelona where he spent the best years of his career, especially in the 1964–65 season in which he scored 26 goals and won the Pichichi Trophy (awarded to the top scorer of the league). After playing for four years in Barcelona (where he scored 90 goals in total) he moved to RCD Espanyol.

=== International ===
Ré also played for the Paraguay national team (25 caps), most importantly in the 1958 FIFA World Cup.

=== Coach ===
After retiring from football, Ré became a football coach. His best coaching job was leading the Paraguay national team to the knock-out stage in the 1986 FIFA World Cup.

== Teams managed ==
- CD Eldense
- UD Almería
- Onteniente
- Córdoba CF
- Elche CF
- Club Guaraní
- Paraguay national football team
- Club Necaxa
- Real Betis
- Cerro Porteño
- Deportivo Wanka
- Deportes Temuco

== Honours ==
=== Player ===
==== Club ====
Cerro Porteño

- Paraguayan League: 1954

FC Barcelona

- Copa del Rey (formerly Copa del Generalísimo): 1962–63
- Inter-Cities Fairs Cup (now UEFA Europa League): 1965–66

==== Individual ====
- Pichichi Trophy: 1964–65
