= Daniel Veyt =

Belgian footballer

Personal information
- Date of birth: 9 December 1956 (age 69)
- Place of birth: Baasrode, Belgium
- Height: 1.74 m (5 ft 9 in)
- Position: Striker

Senior career*
Years	Team	Apps	(Gls)
1973–1976	K. Boom F.C.	55	(20)
1976–1980	K. Sint-Niklase S.K.E.	120	(51)
1980–1987	K.S.V. Waregem	232	(72)
1987–1989	RFC Liège	66	(17)
1989–1991	Gent	68	(15)
1991–1993	Sporting Lokeren	48	(5)
1993	KSV Sottegem	15	(3)
Total		604	(183)

International career
1985–1989	Belgium	12	(1)
- * Club domestic league appearances and goals

Daniel Veyt (born 9 December 1956) is a Belgian former footballer who played as a striker. He earned 12 caps for the Belgium national team, and played in the 1986 FIFA World Cup where Belgium finished fourth. During his club career he played for K.S.V. Waregem and R.F.C. de Liège.

== Honours ==
Waregem

- Belgian Cup: runner-up 1981–82
- Belgian Supercup: 1982
- UEFA Cup: 1985–86 (semi-finals)
- Tournoi de Paris: 1985

Belgium

- FIFA World Cup: fourth place 1986

Individual

- Honorary citizen of Sint-Amands: 1986
- Belgian Fair Play Award: 1987
