= Juan Torales =

Paraguayan footballer (born 1956)

Juan Bautista Torales
Personal information
- Full name: Juan Bautista Torales
- Date of birth: 9 March 1956 (age 70)
- Place of birth: Luque, Paraguay
- Height: 1.73 m (5 ft 8 in)
- Positions: Full-back; centre back

Youth career
- Club Julio Correa

Senior career*
| Years | Team | Apps | (Gls) |
| 1976–1981 | Sportivo Luqueño | 120 | (4) |
| 1981–1991 | Libertad | 286 | (6) |
| 1992 | Club Guaraní | | |
| 1993–1995 | Sportivo Luqueño | | |

International career
| 1979–1987 | Paraguay | 77 | (1) |
- * Club domestic league appearances and goals as of April 2008

Juan Bautista Torales, nicknamed Téju (born 9 March 1956 in Luque) is a retired football defender from Paraguay. He was capped 77 times, and scored 1 goal for the Paraguay national football team in an international career that lasted from 1979 to 1989. He played for the Paraguay squad that won the 1979 Copa América. He is the main co-commentator of matches of the Paraguay national football team with Hugo Miño in Play-by-Play on Tigo Sports, Tigo Sports 2 or Tigo Sports 3.

== Career ==
Torales made his professional debut for Sportivo Luqueño in 1976. He joined Libertad in 1981 and played for the club until 1991. He spent the 1992 season with Club Guaraní before returning to Sportivo Luqueño, where he played until his retirement from football in 1995 at the age of 39.
