= Roberto Fernández (footballer, born 1954) =

Paraguayan footballer

Gato Fernández
Personal information
- Full name: Roberto Eladio Fernández Roa
- Date of birth: 9 July 1954 (age 72)
- Place of birth: Asunción, Paraguay
- Height: 1.91 m (6 ft 3 in)
- Position: Goalkeeper

Senior career*
Years	Team	Apps	(Gls)
1973–1976	River Plate Asunción		
1976	Valencia	2	(0)
1976–1978	Espanyol	31	(0)
1978–1985	Cerro Porteño	182	(0)
1985–1987	Deportivo Cali	56	(0)
1987–1988	Libertad	41	(0)
1989–1991	Cerro Porteño		
1991–1993	Internacional	38	(0)
1994	Palmeiras	4	(0)
1995–1997	Cerro Porteño		

International career
1976–1989	Paraguay	78	(0)
- * Club domestic league appearances and goals as of April 2008

Roberto Eladio Fernández Roa (born 9 July 1954) also known as Gato Fernández, is a Paraguayan former professional footballer who played mostly as a goalkeeper. He was capped 78 times for the Paraguay national football team in an international career that lasted from 1976 to 1989. He was also a member of the Paraguayan team that won the 1979 Copa América. He earned the nickname "El Gato" (English: the cat) for his outstanding stretching saves.

== Club career ==
Fernández began his career, debuting professionally, at the age of 17 for Club River Plate of Paraguay. Some of his clubs include Cerro Porteño, Deportivo Cali, RCD Espanyol, Internacional and Palmeiras. He made his international debut for the Paraguay national football team on 10 March 1976 in a Copa del Atlántico match against Uruguay (2–2).

Fernández played his final professional game in 1997 (Cerro Porteño vs. Sportivo Luqueño) at the age of 43, making him the oldest goalkeeper to play professionally in Paraguayan football history.

== International career ==
During the late 1970s to the mid to late 1980s, his only challenger in goal for the Paraguay national team was Ever Hugo Almeida. In the late 1980s, Fernández became the back-up to Jose Luis Chilavert.

During the 1986 World Cup in Mexico, Fernández started for Paraguay in all four games. He stopped a penalty kick from Mexican Hugo Sánchez to hold the host team to a 1–1 draw.

== Retirement ==
After retiring, Fernández dedicated himself to working as a board of director at his original club (River Plate of Paraguay), and representing other footballers. His son, Gatito Fernández, is a professional goalkeeper who began his career at Cerro Porteño and also gained notoriety playing for Botafogo in Brazil.

== Honours ==
=== Club ===
Cerro Porteño

- Primera División: 1990, 1996
- Torneo República: 1991

Internacional

- Campeonato Gaúcho: 1991, 1992
- Copa do Brasil: 1992

Palmeiras

- Campeonato Brasileiro Série A: 1994
- Campeonato Paulista: 1994

=== International ===
Paraguay

- Copa América: 1979
