= History of the Paraguay national football team =

The history of the Paraguay national football team began in 1910 when the national team played a friendly match. The Paraguay played its first international in 1919, a 5–1 loss to Argentina. Paraguay have won the Copa América twice, in 1953 and 1979.

== The beginning (1900–1930) ==
Soon after the introduction of football in Paraguay by Williams Paats, the Liga Paraguaya de Futbol (today Asociación Paraguaya de Fútbol) was created in 1906. The first national football team was organized in 1910 when an invitation by the Argentine club Hércules of Corrientes was received to play a friendly match. Members of that first national team where F. Melián, G. Almeida, A. Rodríguez, M. Barrios, P. Samaniego, J. Morín, Z. Gadea, D. Andreani, C. Mena Porta, B. Villamayor, M. Rojas and E. Erico. The match ended in a 0–0 draw.

Because of the increasing number of invitations to play matches and international tournaments, the Asociación Paraguaya de Fútbol decided to officially create the national team and select the striped red and white jerseys that until this date remain as the official colours (taken from the Paraguayan flag). In late 1919, Paraguay accepted the invitation to play the 1921 Copa América and in order to prepare for that occasion a number of friendly matches were played between 1919 and the start of the tournament in 1921. The first of those friendly matches was a 5–1 loss against Argentina, and it marked the first international game by the Paraguay national football team. When the 1921 Copa América finally arrived, Paraguay surprised everybody by beating then three-time South American champions Uruguay by 2–1, being this the first match in an official competition for the Paraguayan football team. Paraguay eventually finished fourth in the tournament and became a regular participant of the tournament for the next editions.

In 1930, Paraguay participated in the first World Cup, organized by Uruguay. In the first round, Paraguay debuted and lost to the United States (0–3), to then defeat Belgium (1–0) with a goal by Luis Vargas Peña. Only one team was to advance from the group stage, and the U.S. left Paraguay behind.

== First taste of success (1930–1970) ==
After strong participations in the Copa América tournaments of 1929, 1947 and 1949 (where Paraguay finished in second place), Paraguay was ready for their next World Cup competition.

The return to the World Cup was in 1950, where Paraguay faced Sweden and Italy in Group 3. Paraguay failed to advance to the next round after a 2–2 draw against Sweden and a 2–0 loss against Italy.

The first big success came in 1953 when Paraguay won the Copa América disputed in Peru. In their road to the championship, Paraguay defeated Chile (3–0), Bolivia (2–1) and Brazil (2–1); and tied against Ecuador (0–0), Peru (2–2) and Uruguay (2–2). Since Paraguay and Brazil were tied in points at the end of the tournament, a final playoff match was played between them, with Paraguay winning the final by 3–2. Key players of the campaign included Ángel Berni, Heriberto Herrera and Rubén Fernández. The coach was Manuel Fleitas Solich.

For the 1958 World Cup, Paraguay surprisingly qualified ahead of Uruguay (beating them 5–0 in the decisive game) with a team that contained a formidable attacking lineup with stars such as Juan Bautista Agüero, José Parodi, Juan Romero, Cayetano Ré and Florencio Amarilla. In their first game in Sweden, Paraguay were 3–2 up against France in a game they lost 7–3. A 3–2 win over Scotland and a 3–3 draw with Yugoslavia saw Paraguay finish third in their group.

The departure of several of their stars for European football (mainly Spain) resulted in a weakening of Paraguay's football fortunes somewhat, but they were only edged out by Mexico in the 1962 qualifiers.

== More continental success (1970–1990) ==
Paraguay fell short in subsequent World Cup qualifying campaigns, but Copa América success (and that of one of its premier clubs Olimpia in the Copa Libertadores) in 1979 shored up Paraguay as a solid player on the continent.

The 1979 Copa América was won by Paraguay after finishing first in Group C (which had Uruguay and Ecuador as well) with two wins and two draws. In the semi-finals, Paraguay defeated Brazil by an aggregate score of 4–3. In the finals, Paraguay defeated Chile by an aggregate score of 3–1 to claim its second continental crown. Players such as Romerito, Carlos Alberto Kiese, Alicio Solalinde, Roberto Paredes, Hugo Ricardo Talavera and Eugenio Morel where an important part of the team, coached by Ranulfo Miranda.

Paraguay ended a 28-year absence from the World Cup in 1986 with a team starring Roberto Fernández in goal; Cesar Zabala, Rogelio Delgado and Juan Bautista Torales in defence; Jorge Amado Nunes and Vladimiro Schettina in midfield; midfield playmaker Romerito and strikers Roberto Cabañas, Ramón Ángel María Hicks and Rolando Chilavert (the older brother of José Luis Chilavert). In first round matches, Paraguay defeated Iraq (1–0, goal scored by Romerito) and then tied Mexico (1–1, goal scored by Romerito) and Belgium (2–2, both goals scored by Roberto Cabañas). They reached the second round where they were beaten 3–0 by England.

== The golden generation (1990–2011) ==
A drought followed once again, as Paraguay failed to reach the 1990 and 1994 World Cups.

In 1992, Paraguay won the South American Pre-Olympic tournament, which guaranteed a spot in the 1992 Summer Olympics football competition. In the Olympics, Paraguay finished second in its group and were eliminated by Ghana in the quarter-finals. The most important aspect of that Paraguay team was the emergence of new young players like Carlos Gamarra, Celso Ayala, José Luis Chilavert, Francisco Arce and José Cardozo, which became part of the "golden generation" that led Paraguay to three-straight World Cups and good performances in continental competitions, establishing Paraguay as one of the top teams in South America alongside Brazil, Argentina, and Uruguay.

=== 1998 FIFA World Cup qualification ===
Pos	Team	Pld	W	D	L	GF	GA	GD	Pts	Qualification	(Argentina)	(Paraguay)	(Colombia)	(Chile)	(Peru)	(Ecuador)	(Uruguay)	(Bolivia)	(Venezuela)
1	Argentina	16	8	6	2	23	13	+10	30	1998 FIFA World Cup	—	1–1	1–1	1–1	2–0	2–1	0–0	3–1	2–0
2	Paraguay	16	9	2	5	21	14	+7	29	1998 FIFA World Cup	1–2	—	2–1	2–1	2–1	1–0	3–1	2–1	1–0
3	Colombia	16	8	4	4	23	15	+8	28	1998 FIFA World Cup	0–1	1–0	—	4–1	0–1	1–0	3–1	3–0	1–0
4	Chile	16	7	4	5	32	18	+14	25	1998 FIFA World Cup	1–2	2–1	4–1	—	4–0	4–1	1–0	3–0	6–0
5	Peru	16	7	4	5	19	20	−1	25		1–1	1–0	1–1	2–1	—	1–1	2–1	2–1	4–1
6	Ecuador	16	6	3	7	22	21	+1	21		2–0	2–1	0–1	1–1	4–1	—	4–0	1–0	1–0
7	Uruguay	16	6	3	7	18	21	−3	21		0–0	0–2	1–1	1–0	2–0	5–3	—	1–0	3–1
8	Bolivia	16	4	5	7	18	21	−3	17		2–1	0–0	2–2	1–1	0–0	2–0	1–0	—	6–1
9	Venezuela	16	0	3	13	8	41	−33	3		2–5	0–2	0–2	1–1	0–3	1–1	0–2	1–1	—

Paraguay concluded the qualifiers in second position, one point below Argentina.

=== 1998 FIFA World Cup ===
Pos	Team	Pld	W	D	L	GF	GA	GD	Pts	Qualification
1	Nigeria	3	2	0	1	5	5	0	6	Advance to knockout stage
2	Paraguay	3	1	2	0	3	1	+2	5	Advance to knockout stage
3	Spain	3	1	1	1	8	4	+4	4	
4	Bulgaria	3	0	1	2	1	7	−6	1	

Source: FIFA

The Albirroja returned to the FIFA World Cup final stages for the first time since 1986, coached by the Brazilian Paulo César Carpegiani. The squad featured experienced players such as Celso Ayala, Carlos Gamarra, Roberto Acuña, Catalino Rivarola and national team captain José Luís Chilavert, who all had at least 40 appearances to their name. Paraguay were drawn into Group D, alongside Bulgaria, who had finished in fourth place in 1994; Nigeria, which featured gold medalists from the 1996 Summer Olympics and players from 1994; and also Spain, who had made it to the second round stage at the last four previous World Cups. On 12 June, Paraguay would face Bulgaria were the match would end in a 0–0 draw. The match saw Bulgarian midfielder Anatoli Nankov receive a red card in the 89th minute. On 19 June, Paraguay faced Spain in Saint-Étienne as the two sides drew 0–0.

Paraguay were then scheduled to face Nigeria in their last group stage fixture on 24 June. The Albirroja had claimed just two points from two matches and Nigeria, on six points, were already through to the next round after winning their first two group stage matches. Paraguay required all three points from the fixture against Nigeria if they were to progress to the second round. In the first minute of the match, Celso Ayala headed Paraguay into the lead, latching on to a free kick, however, Wilson Oruma equalized for Nigeria in the 10th minute. Miguel Ángel Benítez then scored for Paraguay in the 58th minute, and as the second half concluded, José Cardozo received the ball in front of goal to put the ball low past goalkeeper Peter Rufai. The match concluded 3–1 in favour of Paraguay as they finished in second position of the table with five points, and they would advance to the Round of 16, despite Spain's 6–1 win over Bulgaria but only finishing with four points on the table, to face hosts France. On 28 June, France and Paraguay met in Lens. France were without their number #10 Zinedine Zidane, and were held 0–0 by Paraguay for the entire duration of the 90 minutes. In the 114th minute of extra-time, Laurent Blanc scored for France, eliminating Paraguay via the golden goal rule. At the conclusion of the competition, defender Carlos Gamarra and goalkeeper and captain José Luís Chilavert were selected as part of the All-Star Team.

=== 1999 Copa América ===
Group A
Team	Pld	W	D	L	GF	GA	GD	Pts
Paraguay (H)	3	2	1	0	5	0	+5	7
Peru	3	2	0	1	4	3	+1	6
Bolivia	3	0	2	1	1	2	−1	2
Japan	3	0	1	2	3	8	−5	1

(H) Hosts

Paraguay were hosts of the 1999 Copa América, disputed in four cities throughout the country, which saw three (Estadio Feliciano Cáceres, Monumental Río Parapití and Estadio Antonio Oddone Sarubbi) of the five venues undergo maintenance and renovation before the respective stadiums would be opened again for the competition. Paraguayan–Uruguayan Ever Hugo Almeida had been named by the Paraguayan Football Association was head coach of the national team, selecting a relatively experienced squad for the competition, with the majority of the players having been present at the 1998 World Cup one year earlier. Three players under the age of 20 were included in the squad, including 19-year-old Cerro Porteño player Diego Gavilán; 19-year-old River Plate winger Nelson Cuevas, who had participated for Paraguay U20 at both the 1999 South American Youth Championship and the 1999 FIFA World Youth Championship; and ultimately 17-year-old Roque Santa Cruz, who had been a big influence in Paraguay's U20 team after scoring three goals at the 1999 FIFA World Youth Championship and three goals at the 1999 FIFA World Youth Championship. Santa Cruz had debuted for Olimpia Asunción two years earlier at the age of 15 and had already participated at and scored in the 1998 Copa Mercosur. Regarded as prospect for Paraguayan football, prior to the commencement of the competition, Santa Cruz scored his first international goal for Paraguay in a 3–2 friendly match defeat against Uruguay on 17 June at the Estadio Antonio Oddone Sarubbi in Ciudad del Este. Controversially, goalkeeper José Luís Chilavert demonstrated humble leader ship after refusing to participate at the tournament, complaining bitterly about the incompetence of the local directors and despite being officially honored by the latest government, he believed his country should have invested money in education rather than football. Chilavert was replaced by Ricardo Tavarelli.

Grouped with Bolivia, Japan and Peru, the Albirroja played their first match of the competition on 29 June at the Estadio Defensores del Chaco, drawing 0–0 against Bolivia. On 2 July, Paraguay faced Japan, playing again at the Estadio Defensores del Chaco. A double each from Miguel Ángel Benítez and Roque Santa Cruz (both of his goals being headers) sealed a 4–0 victory for Paraguay. In Paraguay's third and last group stage fixture against Peru on 5 July, Roque Santa Cruz was played through one-on-one with the goalkeeper which saw the striker dribble past the opponent to the left side of goal and score his third goal of the competition, which Paraguay ultimately won 1–0. The match was disputed at the Monumental Río Parapití in Pedro Juan Caballero. The Albirroja were undefeated, topping the group with seven points, scoring five goals and conceding none. Paraguay were drawn against Uruguay at the quarter-final stage. The fixture was disputed on 10 July at the Estadio Defensores del Chaco in Asunción. In the 15th minute of the first half, Benítez received the ball in the 18-year box before turning his opponent and giving Paraguay the lead. Marcelo Zalayeta equalised for Uruguay in the 65th minute and the match was ultimately decided via a penalty shootout, which saw Paraguay defeated 5–3. One month following the conclusion of the competition, Roque Santa Cruz was sold to Germany's Bayern Munich, despite having the chance to have joined Real Madrid. The striker was ultimately awarded with the Paraguayan Footballer of the Year award in 1999.

=== 2001 Copa América ===
Group B
Team	Pld	W	D	L	GF	GA	GD	Pts
Brazil	3	2	0	1	5	2	+3	6
Mexico	3	1	1	1	1	1	0	4
Peru	3	1	1	1	4	5	−1	4
Paraguay	3	0	2	1	4	6	−2	2

Uruguayan coach Sergio Markarián selected a squad which was mostly made up of domestic based players. Defender Denis Caniza and midfielder Estanislao Struway, who were present at the 1998 World Cup, would make up part of the squad. Goalkeeper Ricardo Tavarelli would turn out in Paraguay's starting XI, as José Luís Chilavert would be absent, as well as striker Roque Santa Cruz. A 21-year-old Darío Verón would be part of the squad, participating in his first major competition. Paraguay were drawn against Peru, Mexico and Brazil. In their opening fixture on 12 July, Paraguay fell behind 1–0 in the 17th minute. Virgilio Ferreira, a veteran from the 1993 Copa América, would level the match for Paraguay in the 23rd minute. Peru's Juan Pajuelo would score in the 57th minute, as Paraguay were behind until the 64th minute as Ferreiro scored his second goal of the match. Peru gained the lead for the third time in the match in the 72nd minute, after José del Solar had scored. Silvio Garay would bring Paraguay level again in the 90th minute, as the fixture ended 3–3. On 15 July, Paraguay drew 0–0 with Mexico in their second group stage fixture. Paraguay then faced Brazil on 18 July in their last group stage fixture. Guido Alvarenga gave Paraguay the lead in the 11th minute after converting a penalty, however, Brazil responded with three goals in the second half to win 3–1 and eventually top the group and eliminate Paraguay, who had obtained just two points at the competition.

=== 2002 FIFA World Cup qualification ===
Pos	Team	Pld	W	D	L	GF	GA	GD	Pts	Qualification
1	Argentina	18	13	4	1	42	15	+27	43	2002 FIFA World Cup
2	Ecuador	18	9	4	5	23	20	+3	31	2002 FIFA World Cup
3	Brazil	18	9	3	6	31	17	+14	30	2002 FIFA World Cup
4	Paraguay	18	9	3	6	29	23	+6	30	2002 FIFA World Cup
5	Uruguay	18	7	6	5	19	13	+6	27	Inter-confederation play-offs
6	Colombia	18	7	6	5	20	15	+5	27	
7	Bolivia	18	4	6	8	21	33	−12	18	
8	Peru	18	4	4	10	14	25	−11	16	
9	Venezuela	18	5	1	12	18	44	−26	16	
10	Chile	18	3	3	12	15	27	−12	12	

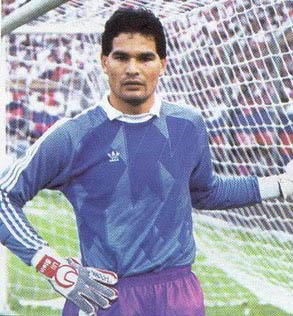
Chilavert was a key figure during the qualifiers, scoring four times, as Paraguay qualified for Korea-Japan 02.

Paraguay commenced began its 2002 FIFA World Cup qualifying campaign in late March in 2000, suffering a 2–0 away defeat against Peru. One month later, they faced Uruguay at home and would defeat the visiting side 1–0 after Celso Ayala had scored for the Albirroja in the 35th minute. On 3 June 2000, a double from Hugo Brizuela helped Paraguay to a 3–1 home victory against Ecuador, before Paraguay were defeated 3–1 away against Chile at the end of the month, José Cardozo being the only goal scorer. On 18 July 2000, Paraguay earned an important 2–1 home victory against Brazil in front of 40,000 spectators at the Estadio Defensores del Chaco in Asunción. Carlos Humberto Paredes had scored for Paraguay in the sixth minute, before 1999 FIFA World Player of the Year Rivaldo would score for the away team in the 74th minute. The deadlock was broken in the 83rd minute when Jorge Luis Campos scored for the home side, securing the 2–1 victory for the Albirroja. Paraguay would then draw the next two fixtures before hosting Venezuela at home on 2 September 2000. Paraguay scored three first half goals, coming from Gabriel González, José Cardozo and Carlos Humberto Paredes. In Round 9, the following fixture, Paraguay maintained another clean sheet, defeating Colombia 2–0 away in Bogotá on 7 October 2000. Both Roque Santa Cruz and José Luís Chilavert registering their first goals of the qualifiers.

On 15 November 2000, Paraguay defeated Peru 5–1 at home in Round 10, with goals coming from Santa Cruz, Cardozo and Paredes, and also José Luís Chilavert, who had converted a penalty in the 83rd minute. In Round 11, Paraguay's first fixture in 2001 saw them defeat Uruguay 1–0 away in Montevideo, after Guido Alvarenga scored in the 64th minute. From rounds 9 to 10, Paraguay had maintained their position in third spot on the table, and were placed in second position after their round 11 victory against Uruguay. In Round 12 on 24 April 2001, Paraguay fell 2–1 away in Quito against Ecuador, having been winning 1–0 after José Cardozo scored in the 26th minute. Agustín Delgado netted a double which gave the home side the 2–1 victory. On 2 June 2001, Paraguay and Chile were held at 0–0, in a fixture which saw José Luís Chilavert unsuccessfully attempt to convert a penalty kick, and also a second half red card for Celso Ayala, until the 92nd minute which saw Carlos Humberto Paredes score for Paraguay, giving the Albirroja their eighth victory of the qualifiers.

On 15 August 2001, Paraguay were defeated 2–0 away against Brazil in Round 14. On 5 September 2001, in round 15, Paraguay defeated Bolivia 5–1 in Asunción, with Carlos Humberto Paredes scoring his fifth goal of the qualifiers and José Cardozo scoring a double, reaching six goals during the qualifiers. The fixture also saw second half goals from José Luís Chilavert and Roque Santa Cruz. One month later in Round 16, Paraguay faced Argentina on 7 October 2001. Argentina had been in first position of the qualifiers table since Round 1, and Paraguay had maintained second position since Round 11. The match was goalless, until the 51st minute which saw Chilavert score a penalty for Paraguay. Mauricio Pochettino equalized for Argentina in the 67th minute before Gustavo Morínigo gave Paraguay the lead three minutes later, in the 70th minute. Another three minutes later, Gabriel Batistuta scored for Argentina, in the 73rd minute, as the match ended 2–2. Paraguay were then defeated 3–1 away against Venezuela in Round 17 on 8 November 2001, Francisco Arce scoring Paraguay's only goal, and Paraguay would also be defeated in Round 18, 4–0 at home against Colombia on 14 November 2001, a match which saw Víctor Aristizábal score a hat-trick for the away team. Paraguay, who had remained in second spot on the table since Round 11, finished in fourth position after Round 18, with 30 points, qualifying for the 2002 FIFA World Cup. Both José Saturnino Cardozo and Carlos Humberto Paredes were in the top 10 leading goal scorers of the qualifiers. Cardozo ranking fifth, with six goals in fourteen matches, and Paredes ranking tenth, having scored five goals in sixteen matches.

=== 2002 FIFA World Cup ===
Pos	Team	Pld	W	D	L	GF	GA	GD	Pts	Qualification
1	Spain	3	3	0	0	9	4	+5	9	Advance to knockout stage
2	Paraguay	3	1	1	1	6	6	0	4	Advance to knockout stage
3	South Africa	3	1	1	1	5	5	0	4	
4	Slovenia	3	0	0	3	2	7	−5	0	

Source: FIFA
Rules for classification: Tie-breaking criteria

Paraguay came into the 2002 FIFA World Cup tournament with most of their players from France 98, for the first time in a major competition the number #9 was issued to 20-year-old Roque Santa Cruz, as José Luís Chilavert would captain the Albirroja at the tournament. Italian coach Cesare Maldini, would also take with him Diego Gavilán, Julio César Cáceres, Nelson Cuevas, Carlos Bonet and Justo Villar to the tournament, young players in their early twenties who had ideally been brought into the squad to make way after the near future retirements of José Luis Chilavert, Ricardo Tavarelli, Francisco Arce, Celso Ayala, Estanislao Struway and Guido Alvarenga. Maldini's appointing as coach, which had taken place in January 2002, had caused controversy as domestic managers were overlooked (prompting the managers union to try to unsuccessfully expel him for immigration breaches and because he spoke little Spanish). Maldini nonetheless had the support of goalkeeper José Luis Chilavert and several other senior players. Maldini would become the oldest coach at the 2002 FIFA World Cup tournament, with the age of 70. His son, Paolo Maldini, captained Italy at the same tournament. Paraguay were drawn into Group B with Spain, South Africa and Slovenia. The Albirroja would face South Africa in their opening group stage match on 2 June at the Busan Asiad Main Stadium in South Korea. Paraguay were without goalkeeper and captain José Luís Chilavert for their first match, as he had spat on Brazil's Roberto Carlos during the qualification campaign, an action which caused FIFA to give him a four-match suspension (later reduced to three) which forced him to watch Paraguay's opening fixture against South Africa from the stands. Paraguay commenced with match with Ricardo Tavarelli as goalkeeper and Carlos Gamarra as captain. Paraguay were presented with a free kick in the 39th minute, which was taken by Francisco Arce and eventually headed into the net by Roque Santa Cruz. Arce himself took another free kick in the 55th minute during the second half, underlining his accuracy with a dead ball, after making it 2–0. South Africa replied with two goals during the last 30 minutes of the fixture to end the tie at 2–2. With the return of Chilavert as captain and goalkeeper, Paraguay faced Spain in their next fixture on 7 June at the Jeonju World Cup Stadium. In the 10th minute, Francisco Arce's shot on goal took a deflection off of Spanish defender Carles Puyol and Paraguay found themselves 1–0 in front. In the second half, Spain's Fernando Morientes would score a double and their captain Fernando Hierro would also convert a penalty to defeat Paraguay 3–1. The result obliged Paraguay to gain three points from their next fixture in order to advance from the group stage. Before the match had commenced, Chilavert had vowed to score against Spain if Paraguay would receive a free kick 'within range', and after conceding two goals from Morientes, Chilavert almost redeemed himself with a good free kick attempt, but the shot was saved by Iker Casillas in the 78th minute. Prior to Paraguay's third group stage fixture against Slovenia, they were required to win by a margin of three goals in order to go through to the round of 16. On 12 June, the two sides faced each other at the Jeju World Cup Stadium, which saw Carlos Humberto Paredes receive his second yellow card in the 22nd minute and Paraguay eventually conceded a goal just as the first half concluded. In the second half, Nelson Cuevas was substituted onto the field for José Cardozo in the 61st minute and would level the scores in the 65th minute. Jorge Luis Campos scored with a low long range strike to put Paraguay ahead in the 73rd minute as Slovenia would then be reduced to ten men after Nastja Čeh was red carded in the 81st minute. Nelson Cuevas would then score Paraguay's third goal with a left footed strike in the 84th minute to win the match at 3–1. Cuevas was ultimately awarded as the Man of the Match. Spain had defeated South Africa 3–2, meaning that although Paraguay and South Africa had finished with four points each, the Albirroja would progress due to goal difference. After the match, captain José Luís Chilavert stated that he was proud of his team and believed that they could accomplish a lot more. Paraguay were then drawn against Germany at the round of 16 stages. The two sides faced each other on 15 June, which saw star striker Roque Santa Cruz substituted off of the field in the 29th minute due to injury. Germany, who had been the more dominant side throughout the match, eventually scored in the 88th minute to win the match after Oliver Neuville netted past Chilavert after receiving the ball which was crossed into him from the wing. Roberto Acuña would also receive his marching orders in the 92nd minute, receiving his second yellow card.

==== Incident between José Luís Chilavert and Roque Santa Cruz ====
On 10 June 2013, it was reported that José Luís Chilavert had stated that Roque Santa Cruz had pretended to be injured in order to miss the match against Germany at the round of 16 stage of the 2002 FIFA World Cup. Chilavert claimed that this was because Karl-Heinz Rummenigge, who at the time was vice president of Bayern Munich (which was the club were Santa Cruz had played at from 1999 to 2007), had visited the hotel that Paraguay were staying at and had apparently told Santa Cruz not to play against Germany.

Francisco Arce defended Santa Cruz, informing that "Chilavert comes out to say stupid things every now and then. Don't believe him. Roque is the most professional person that I have ever met in my time in the national team, he is a man that doesn't have a stain in any place".

Prior to the match in 2002, the media stated that the match would have special significance for Santa Cruz due to playing for a German club. Prior to the match, Santa Cruz informed "I'm very excited – I have been dreaming of this. If I have a chance I will kill them – I know all their tricks. It will be a special game for me against my friends and colleagues from Bayern Munich, but I don't take it as a personal challenge. I have been living there for three years and I like the country very much, but I think they will understand that I must do my best and I won't need motivating. Germany are a powerful team, with players of the highest calibre, and their name is written into World Cup history", and in 2013 Roque Santa Cruz himself then stated to Paraguay's Telefuturo that Chilavert's comments were false because they were stated more than ten years after the incident. Santa Cruz also stated that what had been said was painful because alongside Chilavert he had shared many experiences but the people had seen Santa Cruz play and were aware of his professionalism.

==== 2004 Copa América ====
Group C
Team	Pld	W	D	L	GF	GA	GD	Pts
Paraguay	3	2	1	0	4	2	+2	7
Brazil	3	2	0	1	6	3	+3	6
Costa Rica	3	1	0	2	3	6	−3	3
Chile	3	0	1	2	2	4	−2	1

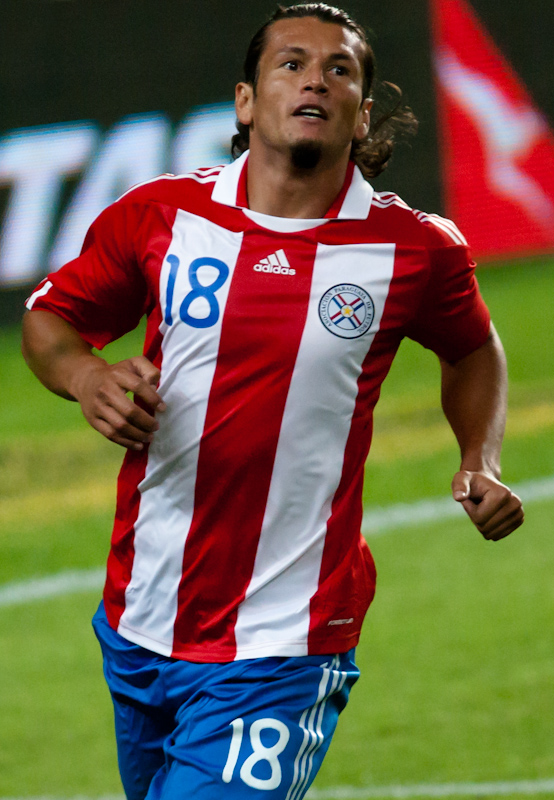
The 2004 Copa América was Nelson Haedo's first major competition for the Albirroja.

Coach Carlos Jara Saguier took with him a relatively young squad to the 2004 Copa América, with the majority of players being under the age of 25. Experienced defender, Carlos Gamarra, who at the time was playing for Inter Milan, was one of a small number of overseas based footballers, with most of the squad's players tied to clubs of the Primera División Paraguaya. Dante López, of Spain's Córdoba CF and Reggina Calcio midfielder Carlos Humberto Paredes would be among the foreign based players to the join the squad. The competition was also Nelson Haedo Valdez's first major tournament for the Albirroja, the SV Werder Bremen striker had been present for Paraguay U20 at the 2003 FIFA World Youth Championship one year earlier, alongside Edgar Barreto and Julio dos Santos. Paraguay had been drawn into Group C, with Brazil, Costa Rica and Chile. An 85th minute Julio dos Santos penalty sealed Paraguay's 1–0 victory in their first group stage match against Costa Rica on 8 July. A 78th minute equalizing goal from Ernesto Cristaldo was enough to give Paraguay a 1–1 draw with Chile in the following match on 11 July. In Paraguay's last fixture against an undefeated Brazil on 14 July, Julio Valentín González gave the Albirroja a 1–0 victory in the 29th minute of the first half before Luís Fabiano equalized for Brazil in the 35th minute. Libertad striker Fredy Bareiro scored in the 71st minute to give Paraguay the lead and the eventual 2–1 victory, which saw Paraguay top the group as undefeated, with seven points. Paraguay were drawn against Uruguay in the quarter-finals on 18 July. Carlos Gamarra gave a 1–0 lead in the 15th minute before Carlos Bueno scored a penalty for Uruguay in the 40th minute. A second half double from Darío Silva, in the 65th and 88th minutes, gave Uruguay a 3–1 victory and eliminated Paraguay from the competition. Despite Paraguay's exit from the competition, several players from the 2004 Copa América squad went on to represent Paraguay U23 at the 2004 Summer Olympics, finished in second place, and also participate in the qualifiers for the 2006 FIFA World Cup.

==== 2006 FIFA World Cup qualification ====
Pos	Team	Pld	W	D	L	GF	GA	GD	Pts	Qualification	(Brazil)	(Argentina)	(Ecuador)	(Paraguay)	(Uruguay)	(Colombia)	(Chile)	(Venezuela)	(Peru)	(Bolivia)
1	Brazil	18	9	7	2	35	17	+18	34 (Note: Tied on head-to-head results. Overall goal difference was used as the tiebreaker.)	2006 FIFA World Cup	—	3–1	1–0	4–1	3–3	0–0	5–0	3–0	1–0	3–1
2	Argentina	18	10	4	4	29	17	+12	34	2006 FIFA World Cup	3–1	—	1–0	0–0	4–2	1–0	2–2	3–2	2–0	3–0
3	Ecuador	18	8	4	6	23	19	+4	28 (Note: Tied on head-to-head points (3). Head-to-head goal difference: Ecuador +2, Paraguay −2.)	2006 FIFA World Cup	1–0	2–0	—	5–2	0–0	2–1	2–0	2–0	0–0	3–2
4	Paraguay	18	8	4	6	23	23	0	28	2006 FIFA World Cup	0–0	1–0	2–1	—	4–1	0–1	2–1	1–0	1–1	4–1
5	Uruguay	18	6	7	5	23	28	−5	25	Inter-confederation play-off	1–1	1–0	1–0	1–0	—	3–2	2–1	0–3	1–3	5–0
6	Colombia	18	6	6	6	24	16	+8	24		1–2	1–1	3–0	1–1	5–0	—	1–1	0–1	5–0	1–0
7	Chile	18	5	7	6	18	22	−4	22		1–1	0–0	0–0	0–1	1–1	0–0	—	2–1	2–1	3–1
8	Venezuela	18	5	3	10	20	28	−8	18 (Note: Head-to-head points: Venezuela 4, Peru 1.)		2–5	0–3	3–1	0–1	1–1	0–0	0–1	—	4–1	2–1
9	Peru	18	4	6	8	20	28	−8	18		1–1	1–3	2–2	4–1	0–0	0–2	2–1	0–0	—	4–1
10	Bolivia	18	4	2	12	20	37	−17	14		1–1	1–2	1–2	2–1	0–0	4–0	0–2	3–1	1–0	—

Rules for classification: Tiebreakers
Notes:

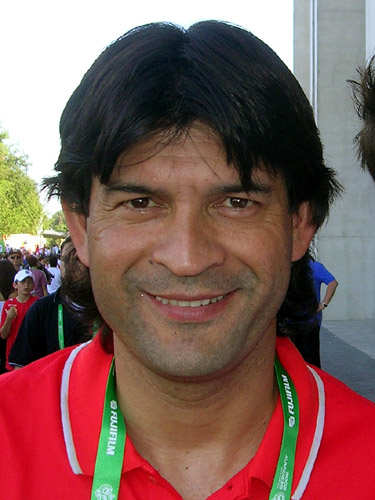
Cardozo scored seven goals during the 2006 FIFA World Cup qualifiers, surpassing the six goals that he scored during the qualifiers for the 2002 competition.

Paraguay began the 2006 FIFA World Cup qualification with three wins in their first four fixtures in 2003. Having been thrashed 4–1 by Peru in Lima in Round 1 on 6 September 2003, Paraguay would defeat Uruguay with the same result at home four days later on 10 September, with José Cardozo netting a hat-trick. Cardozo, who scored in Paraguay's next fixture on 15 November in a 2–1 home victory against Ecuador, tallied four goals in four matches. The next fixture saw Carlos Humberto Paredes score his second goal of the qualifiers, in Paraguay's 1–0 away victory against Chile on 18 November. After their third consecutive victory ain Round 4, Paraguay were in first position of the table. Paraguay's first qualifier in 2004 was a 0–0 home draw against Brazil on 31 March. Despite Cardozo's goalscoring, his fifth goal of the qualifiers, a 33rd minute first half goal against Bolivia in La Paz was not enough to give his side a victory, as Paraguay were defeated 2–1 on 1 June. Paraguay would not get their first, and only, win of 2004 until 5 September in a home fixture against Venezuela. Carlos Gamarra had scored in the 52nd minute to give the Albirroja a 1–0 victory. Having drawn several matches in 2004, Paraguay ended the year with a 1–0 defeat on 17 November in an away fixture against Uruguay. Despite the results, Paraguay would only drop as low as fourth place on the table. In their first qualifier for 2005, Paraguay took a 2–0 lead against Ecuador on 27 March in Quito after just 14 minutes. Cardozo scoring a penalty in the 10th minute, and his sixth goal of the campaign, and Salvador Cabañas scoring the other. Paraguay would then concede five goals, as Ecuador came behind to defeat the Albirroja. Three days later, Paraguay defeated Chile 2–1 in Asunción on 30 March. Both Gustavo Morínigo and José Cardozo scoring for the home side. In their next fixture, Brazil would defeat Paraguay 4–1 away in Porto Alegre, with Roque Santa Cruz scoring Paraguay's only goal with a header in the 72nd minute. In Round 15 on 8 June, Paraguay defeated Bolivia 4–1 at home, with goals coming from Carlos Gamarra, Roque Santa Cruz, Julio César Cáceres and Jorge Martín Núñez. In Round 16 of the qualifiers, Roque Santa Cruz scored with a left foot shot for the Albirroja in the 14th minute of the first half as Paraguay defeated Argentina 1–0 on 3 September. The win was Paraguay's first officially victory over Argentina. Paraguay maintained fourth position until the following round when they would achieve third position, where they defeated Venezuela 1–0 away in Maracaibo after Nelson Valdez had scored in the 64th minute. In round 18, Paraguay were defeated 1–0 at home against Colombia. Paraguay concluded the qualifiers in fourth position of the table, qualifying for their third consecutive FIFA World Cup. José Cardozo finished equal second in the leading goal scorers table, with Hernan Jorge Crespo, with seven goals.

==== 2006 FIFA World Cup ====
Pos	Team	Pld	W	D	L	GF	GA	GD	Pts	Qualification
1	England	3	2	1	0	5	2	+3	7	Advance to knockout stage
2	Sweden	3	1	2	0	3	2	+1	5	Advance to knockout stage
3	Paraguay	3	1	0	2	2	2	0	3	
4	Trinidad and Tobago	3	0	1	2	0	4	−4	1	

Source: FIFA
Rules for classification: Tie-breaking criteria

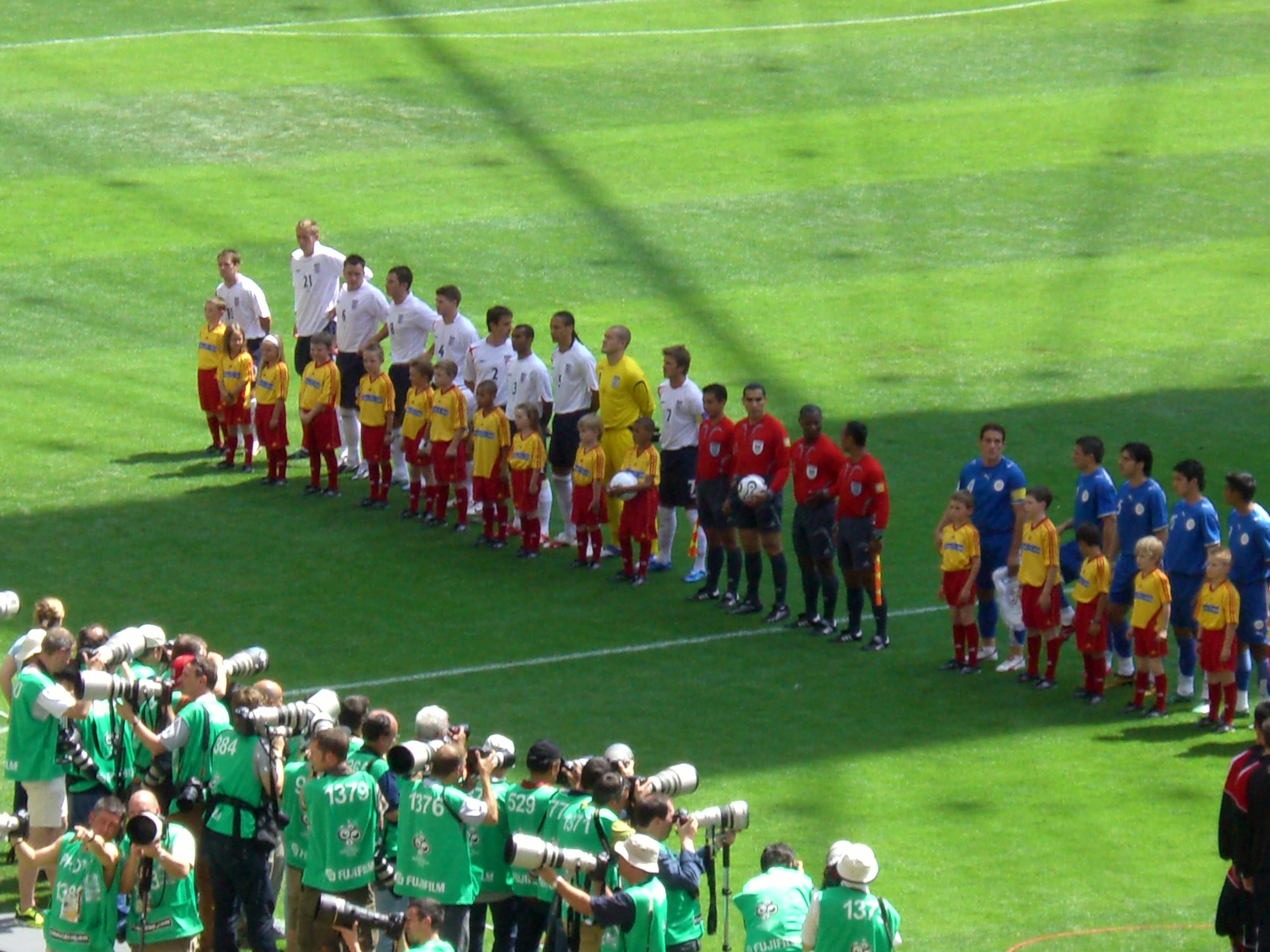
Paraguay during the line-up against England at the 2006 FIFA World Cup

The Uruguayan Aníbal Ruiz took with him 8 European based players and 11 South American based players, including captain Carlos Gamarra, to Germany for the 2006 tournament. Paraguay were without experienced striker José Cardozo, who had finished equal second in the CONMEBOL qualification with seven goals and had been named in the original squad, was injured during training sessions and replaced by Genoa striker Dante López. This was Paraguay's third consecutive FIFA World Cup tournament and the squad was expected to advance from beyond the group stage, given the experienced players within the side. Carlos Gamarra, Roque Santa Cruz, Nelson Cuevas, Carlos Bonet, Carlos Humberto Paredes, Diego Gavilán, Denis Caniza, Julio César Cáceres and Roberto Acuña had already represented Paraguay at previous FIFA World Cup tournaments. Both Roberto Acuña and Carlos Gamarra were participating in their third consecutive FIFA World Cup competition, and Gamarra shared the distinction of having also represented the Paraguay national under-23 football team at both the 1992 Summer Olympics and the 2004 Summer Olympics, the latter in which Édgar Barreto and Julio César Manzur had also participated, the latter two were also selected in the 23-man squad for Germany.

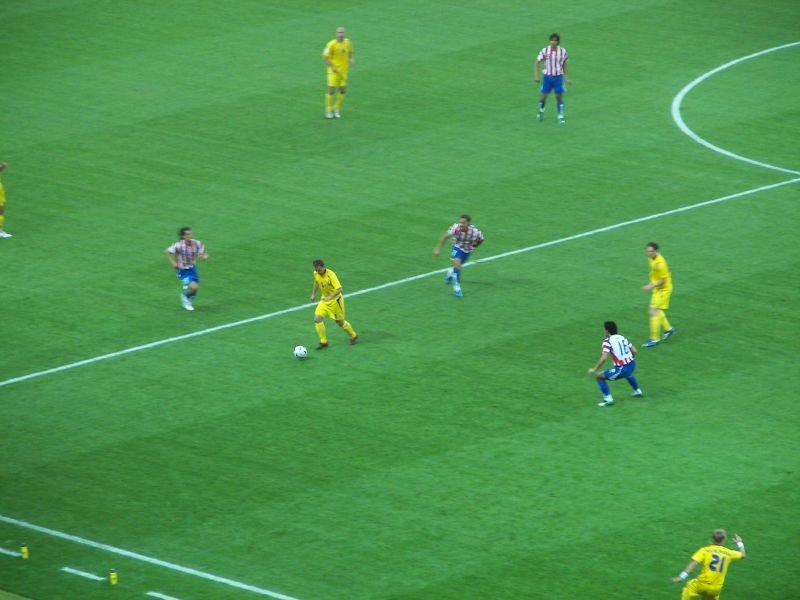
Paraguay against Sweden at the 2006 FIFA World Cup

Paraguay were drawn into Group B alongside England, Sweden and Trinidad and Tobago. Paraguay faced England in their opening group stage match on 10 June in Frankfurt. After just three minutes, David Beckham had taken a long-distance free kick which landed in England's 18-yard box and the ball was eventually headed into England's goal after coming off of Carlos Gamarra, who became one of four players to register an own goal at the tournament. Just moments later, goalkeeper Justo Villar was replaced by Aldo Bobadilla in the 8th minute after damaging his leg attempting a sliding clearance. Villar left the field in tears and was subsequently sidelined for the rest of the tournament. Paraguay had started with Roque Santa Cruz and Nelson Valdez up front and also maintained a strong midfield with Carlos Bonet, Cristian Riveros, Carlos Humberto Paredes and Roberto Acuña, however, England managed to hold onto their 1–0 lead to earn a victory. With Sweden and Trinidad and Tobago having drawn, Paraguay was required to gain at least one point in their next fixture in order to avoid elimination. They then faced Sweden on 15 June in Berlin in a match which was ultimately decided in the 89th minute when Freddie Ljungberg headed past Aldo Bobadilla, effectively eliminated Paraguay after just two group stage matches without the Albirroja scoring a single goal. Paraguay's only compensation came in their third and last group stage fixture on against Trinidad and Tobago on 20 June. After Brent Sancho had netted an own goal and given Paraguay the lead by half-time, Nelson Cuevas was substituted onto the field in the 66th minute for Nelson Valdez and, with a one-two touch with Roque Santa Cruz, Cuevas was able to score in the 86th minute in Paraguay's 2–0 victory. Paraguay finished in third place of their respective group with three points and a two-two For-and-Against goal difference. Paraguay's group stage elimination made them the only South American national team which did not advance beyond the first round, with Argentina, Brazil and Ecuador making it to the round of 16 stage of the competition. Upon the conclusion of Paraguay's 2006 FIFA World Cup campaign, Aníbal Ruiz resigned as head coach and Raúl Vicente Amarilla was assigned as the interim coach, and Carlos Gamarra, who had participated in his tenth major competition for Paraguay, retired from international football.

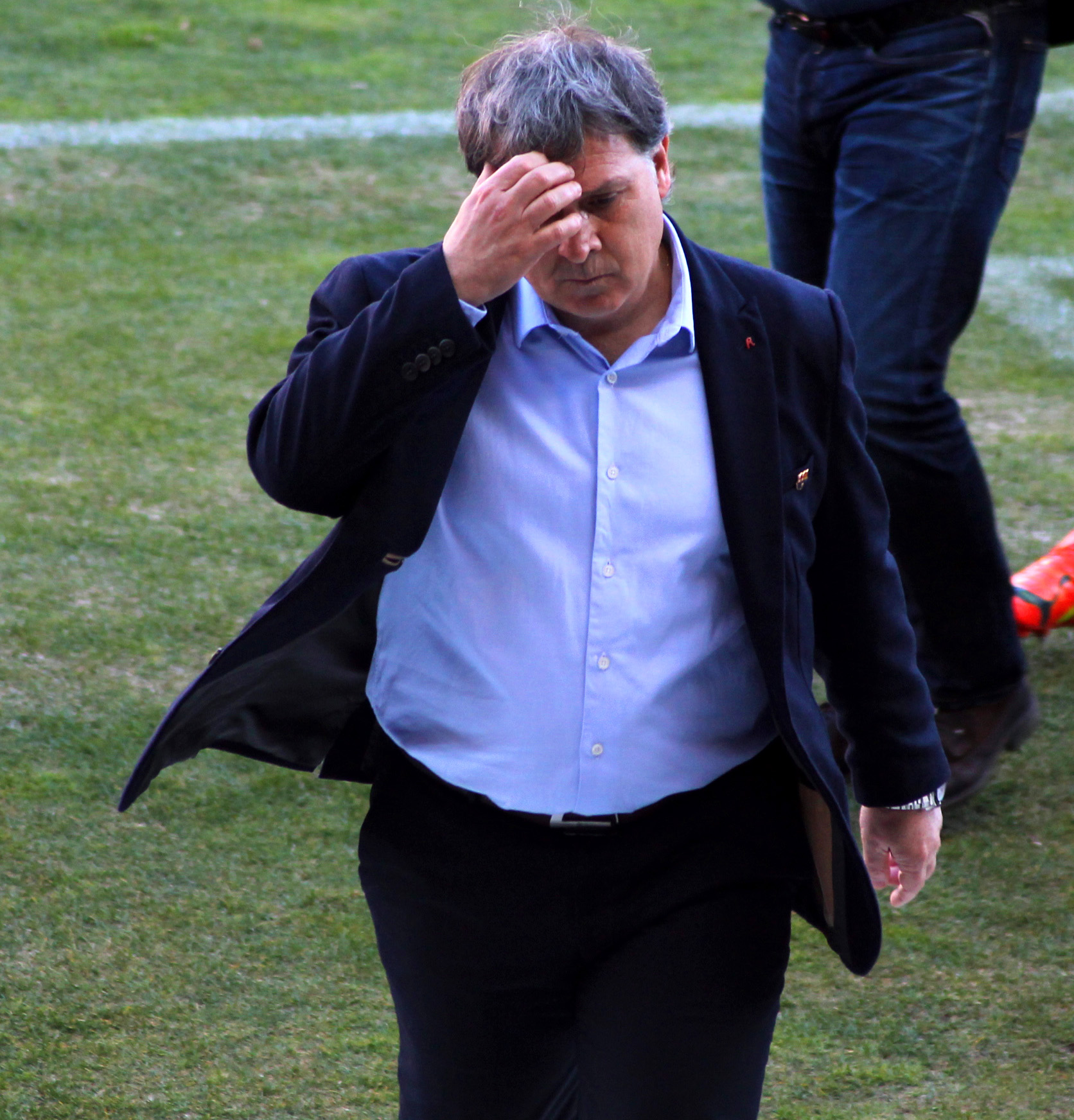
On 30 June 2006, it was announced that Gerardo Martino would be the Albirroja's new coach as of January 2007.

Paraguay's national squad underwent a major transition after Germany 2006 because of the retirement of key players such as Carlos Gamarra, Francisco Arce, Celso Ayala, and goalkeeper José Luis Chilavert. Paraguay's under-20 side had won the Milk Cup in 2002, 2003 and 2006, and players such as Nelson Haedo, Aureliano Torres, Cristian Riveros, Julio dos Santos, José Montiel, Édgar Barreto and Óscar Cardozo were thought key to the re-building of the team. In 2007, Argentine Gerardo "Tata" Martino was designated as head-coach. The former Newell's Old Boys skipper's coaching career had blossomed in Paraguay where he formerly coached Club Libertad and Cerro Porteño.

==== 2007 Copa América ====
Group C
Team	Pld	W	D	L	GF	GA	GD	Pts
Argentina	3	3	0	0	9	3	+6	9
Paraguay	3	2	0	1	8	2	+6	6
Colombia	3	1	0	2	3	9	−6	3
United States	3	0	0	3	2	8	−6	0

Gerardo Martino took with him a relatively experienced squad to Venezuela, with Darío Verón, Claudio Morel Rodríguez, Carlos Bonet, Julio Manzur, Paulo da Silva, Aureliano Torres, Roque Santa Cruz and captain Julio César Cáceres all re-appearing for the national team, and newcomers Enrique Vera, Óscar Cardozo and the Argentine-born Jonathan Santana were appearing for Paraguay in their first major tournaments. The competition also proved to be one of the last national team involvements from veteran Nelson Cuevas. Paraguay were drawn into Group C, alongside Argentina, Colombia, and the USA. In Paraguay's first fixture, they would defeat Colombia 5–0 after a hat-trick from Roque Santa Cruz and a double from Salvador Cabañas. In Paraguay's second fixture against the US, Édgar Barreto opened the scoring in the 29th minute just before the USA's Ricardo Clark would level the scores in the 35th minute. Paraguay would win the match 3–1 after a goal from Óscar Cardozo and a 92nd minute free kick from Salvador Cabañas would seal the game for the Albirroja. With both Paraguay and Argentina having obtained six points and qualifying from beyond their Group C, the two teams faced in their last group stage fixture with a less strengthened side, Roque Santa Cruz, Édgar Barreto, Cristian Riveros and Paolo da Silva all commencing on the bench as Nelson Cuevas would gain his first appearance of the competition and Aldo Bobadilla would play a full 90-minutes of the fixture, replacing Justo Villar for the second time in the tournament. A 79th minute Javier Mascherano goal was enough to seal a 1–0 victory for Argentina, as Paraguay advanced to the knock-out stages to face Mexico. Mexico had already beaten Brazil in the group stage and had finished in first place of their respective Group B with seven points. After Paraguayan goal keeper Aldo Bobadilla had earned a straight red card in the 3rd minute, Paraguay conceded a penalty in the 5th minute and eventually found themselves down 3–0 at half-time. Mexico would score another three more goals, thrashing Paraguay 6–0 and ending their Copa América campaign.

==== 2010 FIFA World Cup qualification ====
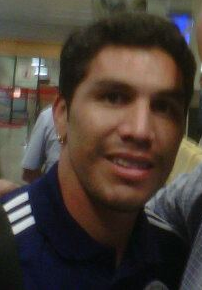
Coach Gerardo Martino regarded Salvador Cabañas as the Albirroja's best player, Martino also considered Cabañas as Paraguay's Lionel Messi.

After a series of friendly matches, Paraguay commencing their 2010 FIFA World Cup qualifying campaign with a 0–0 away draw against Peru in October 2007. Four days later, a 14th-minute goal from Nelson Valdez sealed a 1–0 home victory against Uruguay. Valdez would open the scoring in Paraguay's next match, a 5–1 home victory against Ecuador in November, which saw Cristian Riveros score a double and a goal each from Roque Santa Cruz and Néstor Ayala. In Paraguay's fourth and last World Cup qualifier of 2007, a double from defender Paulo da Silva, who scored both goals with his head from corner kicks, and a goal from Salvador Cabañas earned Paraguay a 3–0 away victory. The victory placed Paraguay in first position of the CONMEBOL table, having conceded just one goal in four matches and having obtained ten points in four matches. Paraguay would eventually remain in first position of the CONMEBOL table for nine consecutive rounds (from round 4 to round 12). In 2008, Paraguay continued preparing for their first World Cup qualification match of that year, playing out five matches by June 2008 (three friendlies and two Kirin Cup matches). On 15 June 2008, Paraguay defeated Brazil 2–0 at home with 10 men. Roque Santa Cruz opened the scoring in the 25th minute, latching on to an Édgar Barreto corner and side footing the ball into the net with his right foot. Dario Verón received his second yellow card of the match in the 47th minute and was subsequently sent off, however, one minute later, Nelson Valdez had played Santa Cruz through and his shot was eventually blocked by Brazil's Júlio César and tapped into the net on the re-bound by Salvador Cabañas who made it 2–0 in the 48th minute. By that stage, Paraguay had conceded just one goal in five rounds. Three days later, Paraguay would lose for the first time in the qualification campaign, in a 4–2 away defeat against Bolivia in La Paz. Paraguay had been trailing 2–0 by half-time when Gerardo Martino made a double substitution when he brought on both Roque Santa Cruz and Nelson Valdez for Salvador Cabañas and Óscar Cardozo in the 62nd minute. Both players managed to score in the second half, however, Bolivia eventually went on to win the match. By September, Paraguay travelled to Buenos Aires to face Argentina on 6 September 2008. In the 14th minute, Nelson Valdez was played through on goal beside Argentine defender Gabriel Heinze. Argentine goal keeper Roberto Abbondanzieri came out to the on rushing bouncing ball, only for Heinze, who intended to clear the ball, headed the ball into his own net as all three players collided. Carlos Tevez was received his second yellow card in the 30th minute and Argentina were down to ten men. Sergio Agüero leveled the scores in the 61st minute and 1–1 was how it finished. Days later, first half goals from Cristian Riveros and Nelson Valdez were enough to seal a 2–0 home victory against Venezuela as Paraguay remained in first position of the CONMEBOL table. In October 2008, Paraguay would earn two 1–0 victories against Colombia and Peru. The results keeping Paraguay in first place of the CONMEBOL table as 2008 concluded, having been defeated just once and having conceded just fix goals in the entire qualification campaign. Paraguay's qualification campaign in 2009 commenced with a 2–0 away loss against Uruguay and a 1–1 away draw against Ecuador, which saw Paulo da Silva red carded in the 84th minute and Édgar Benítez levelling the match in the 92nd minute in Quito. By June, Paraguay would suffer a 2–0 home defeat at the hands of Chile, and after having taken a 1–0 lead thanks to a 25th minute Salvador Cabañas free kick, Paraguay were defeated 2–1 away against Brazil. In the last four matches of the qualification campaign, where which three of the four fixtures would be played at home, Cabañas netted a first half penalty to give Paraguay a 1–0 home victory against Bolivia on 5 September 2009. Qualification was secured in the next fixture against Argentina on 9 September, when Salvador Cabañas had gone around three Argentine players and played Nelson Valdez through on goal who scored with a left footed shot in the 27th minute of the first half. By the 52nd minute of the match, Argentine Juan Sebastian Verón received his second yellow card of the match and Paraguay eventually won the fixture 1–0. The win against Argentina, who at the time were coached by Diego Maradona, was Paraguay's second official win over Argentina. In October, Paraguay concluded the qualification campaign with a 2–1 away victory against Venezuela and a 2–0 home loss against Colombia. Paraguay, who would have finished in first place of the CONMEBOL table had they not lost against Colombia, concluded the qualification campaign with 33 points, as Salvador Cabañas finished in sixth position of the leading goal scorers, having scored six goals. With the exception of Round 1, Paraguay were positioned no lower than third on the CONMEBOL table throughout the duration of the entire qualifying campaign.

Pos	Team	Pld	W	D	L	GF	GA	GD	Pts	Qualification
1	Brazil	18	9	7	2	33	11	+22	34	2010 FIFA World Cup
2	Chile	18	10	3	5	32	22	+10	33	2010 FIFA World Cup
3	Paraguay	18	10	3	5	24	16	+8	33	2010 FIFA World Cup
4	Argentina	18	8	4	6	23	20	+3	28	2010 FIFA World Cup
5	Uruguay	18	6	6	6	28	20	+8	24	Inter-confederation play-offs
6	Ecuador	18	6	5	7	22	26	−4	23	
7	Colombia	18	6	5	7	14	18	−4	23	
8	Venezuela	18	6	4	8	23	29	−6	22	
9	Bolivia	18	4	3	11	22	36	−14	15	
10	Peru	18	3	4	11	11	34	−23	13	

Source: FIFA

==== January 2010 assault on Salvador Cabañas ====
In January 2010, a tragic head injury suffered in an assault forced Salvador Cabañas to abandon football for an unspecified period of time, which gave him no chance of making the final 23-man squad for South Africa 2010. Cabañas was shot in the head inside the "Bar Bar" night club in Mexico City early 25 January 2010 at 5:00 in the morning. Cabañas received medical attention during the early hours of 25 January 2010. Later on the day he was submitted to a craniotomy but doctors decided that it was too risky to proceed and the bullet was not extracted. According to his wife, he tried to react against a robbery, although this account is disputed by reports that the assault was the result of a taunting incident in the bar's bathroom. Mexican police confirmed that a drug dealer and member of the Beltrán-Leyva Cartel called José Balderas Garza, alias JJ, was the man who shot him. Cabañas left intensive care in late February and was hoping to fully recover in time for the FIFA World Cup 2010 but was not selected for the final Paraguay squad. Doctors dealing with Cabañas have described his recovery so far as "tremendous". However, it is announced he does have short-term memory loss and may not recover for another one to three years. He gave his first interview on 12 March 2010 in appreciation to all the people who prayed for him. In 2013, Cabañas gave his version of the incident which stated that in his opinion the attack occurred so that he would not play at the 2010 FIFA World Cup and that Paraguay would not be crowned champions of the competition.

==== 2010 FIFA World Cup ====
Pos	Team	Pld	W	D	L	GF	GA	GD	Pts	Qualification
1	Paraguay	3	1	2	0	3	1	+2	5	Advance to knockout stage
2	Slovakia	3	1	1	1	4	5	−1	4	Advance to knockout stage
3	New Zealand	3	0	3	0	2	2	0	3	
4	Italy	3	0	2	1	4	5	−1	2	

Source: FIFA
Rules for classification: Tie-breaking criteria

Prior to the 2010 FIFA World Cup, Lucas Barrios, an Argentine footballers of Paraguay descent, would change his nationality under FIFA regulations in order to represent the Albirroja at the tournament in South Africa. He would join Nestor Ortigoza and Jonathan Santana in being the third Argentine to be selected in Paraguay's 23-man squad for the tournament. Without Salvador Cabañas, Paraguay had played out five friendly matches in preparation for the tournament, with Lucas Barrios impressing up front after scoring in three consecutive matches (against Ireland, Ivory Coast and Greece) out of the five friendlies played. Despite experiment with young players such as Marcelo Estigarribia, who had scored in Paraguay's first 2010 friendly against South Africa on 31 March, and Hernán Pérez, Paraguay had a full strength and experienced side with Roque Santa Cruz, Édgar Barreto, Carlos Bonet, Enrique Vera, Cristian Riveros, Nelson Valdez and Paulo da Silva, who were the majority of the players that featured in the tournament's qualifying campaign and were believed to have been at the best moment of their football careers. Paraguay had qualified for their fourth consecutive FIFA World Cup tournament, and the 2010 edition proved to be the second tournament for some players, the third consecutive World Cup for Roque Santa Cruz, Carlos Bonet Justo Villar and Julio César Caceres, and a record fourth consecutive World Cup for Denis Caniza. The final squad, which consisted of 9 European based players, were expected to advance to at least the round of 16 stage of the competition according to the Paraguayan media, however, defender Antolín Alcaraz believed that Paraguay had what was "required to reach the semi-finals" and Nelson Valdez also believed that the current generation was the one to go further than Paraguay had ever been before.

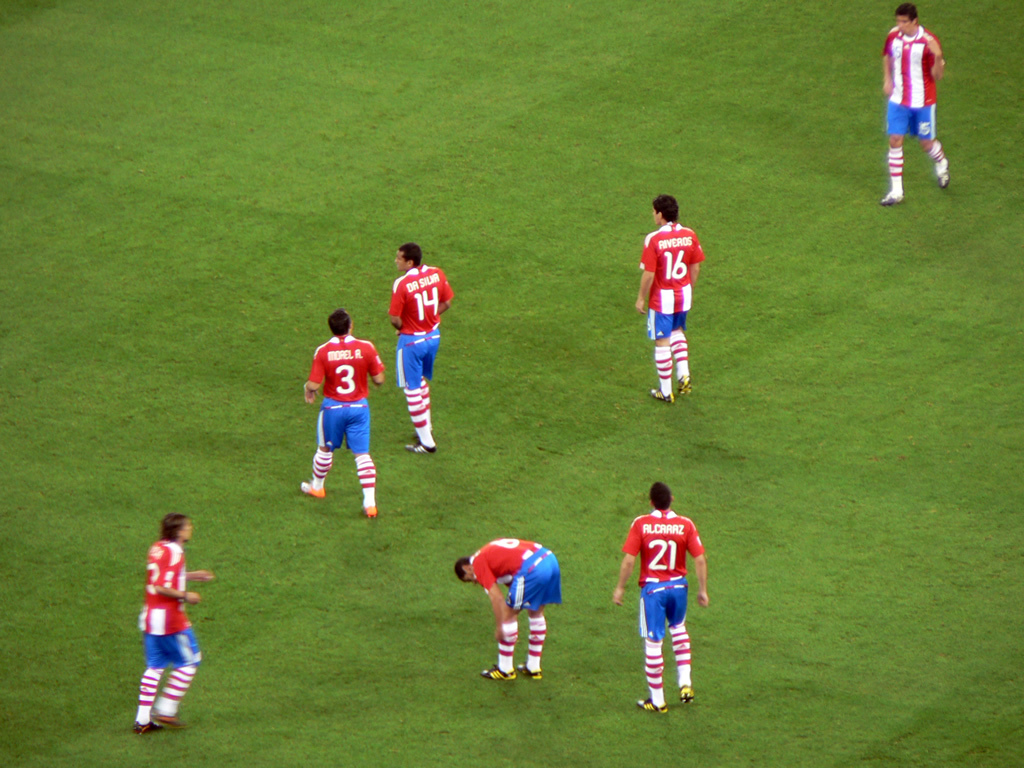
The Albirroja against Italy on 14 June 2010

Paraguay were drawn into Group F alongside World Champions Italy, Slovakia and New Zealand. Paraguay would face Italy in their opening group stage match and would take a 1–0 lead in the 39th minute thanks to a header from Antolín Alcaraz, who latched on to a free kick to beat Gianluigi Buffon. Paraguay eventually drew 1–1 after conceding a goal in the second half. Paraguay faced Slovakia in their second group stage match and would score in the 27th minute of the first half when Enrique Vera would open the scoring in a run of play counterattack on Slovakia. During the second half, Aureliano Torres would deliver a free kick into Paraguay's attacking 18-yard box, where Cristian Riveros would eventually find himself with the ball after receiving it from a Paulo da Silva header, and score from a 20-yard shot, just outside of the 18-yard box, in the 86th minute of the match to give Paraguay a 2–0 lead and eventual victory. The result placed Paraguay in first place of their respective group, with four points. In Paraguay's last group stage fixture, they would play out a 0–0 draw with New Zealand, and eventually finish in first place of Group F. Paraguay were drawn against Japan, who had finished as runners-up in Group E, at the round of 16 stage. The two sides faced each other at the Loftus Versfeld Stadium in Pretoria on 29 June. After 120 minutes, the match was tied at 0–0 and eventually determined via a penalty shoot-out. Édgar Barreto, Lucas Barrios, Cristian Riveros and Nelson Valdez would score four straight penalties for Paraguay, as Japan's Yūichi Komano failed to convert one of Japan's four spot kicks. Óscar Cardozo, who had been substituted onto the field for Roque Santa Cruz in the 94th minute of the match, then stepped up to slot home Paraguay's fifth penalty to win the shoot out at 5–3. The win meant that Paraguay had advanced beyond the round of 16 for the first time in the national team's history. The Albirroja were drawn against Spain, who had defeated Portugal at the round of 16, at the quarter-final stage of the tournament. The match was played on 3 July at the Ellis Park Stadium in Johannesburg in front of 55,359 spectators. Paraguay commenced the match with a strong line up, Nelson Valdez and Oscar Cardozo were partnered up front as Paulo da Silva, Darío Verón, Antolín Alcaraz and Claudio Morel Rodríguez formed a strong defence. The first half, which saw Nelson Valdez score past Iker Casillas but having the goal ruled out for offside, concluded 0–0. The second half saw Óscar Cardozo, who was pulled down by Gerard Piqué in Spain's penalty, fail to convert a penalty for Paraguay in the 59th minute, and four minutes later, Xabi Alonso also failed to convert a penalty for Spain in the 62nd minute, when David Villa was ruled by the referee to have been brought down by Antolín Alcaraz. Xabi Alonso stepped up to take the penalty kick and seemed to have scored, only for the referee to order it be retaken because of encroachment by a Spanish player into the penalty area before the kick was taken. Xabi Alonso's retake was saved by Paraguayan goalkeeper Justo Villar. Paraguay continued to attack when Roque Santa Cruz was substituted onto the field in the 73rd minute for Nelson Valdez, however, Spain ultimately managed to take the lead in the 83rd minute when David Villa collected a rebounded shot off the post from Pedro, to score himself off the post. The goal turned out to be the winner for Spain in the 1–0 result, who would go on to be crowned as World Champions after defeating the Netherlands 1–0 in the final on 11 July. The quarter-final appearance was recorded Paraguay's best ever performance. After the match, Gerardo Martino stated that he would be leaving his position at the end of his contract.

The Albirroja arrived back from South Africa on Monday 5 July 2010 at 03:30AM. Upon arrival, the entire national team was greeted by over 3,000 fans at the Silvio Pettirossi International Airport and were decorated by the then President of Paraguay, Fernando Lugo. Gerardo Martino announced that he would take some time to decide his future, although the Paraguayan Football Association had offered him a four-year contract to continue. Roque Santa Cruz also announced that the 2010 FIFA World Cup would be his last World Cup, but that he may continue to play one more international tournament which would be the 2011 Copa América held in Argentina. After the tournament, the Albirroja would participate in six friendly matches (including a 7–0 thrashing victory against Hong Kong in November), which would see the national team conclude 2010 on a positive note.

==== 2011 Copa América ====
Group B
Team	Pld	W	D	L	GF	GA	GD	Pts
Brazil	3	1	2	0	6	4	+2	5
Venezuela	3	1	2	0	4	3	+1	5
Paraguay	3	0	3	0	5	5	0	3
Ecuador	3	0	1	2	2	5	−3	1

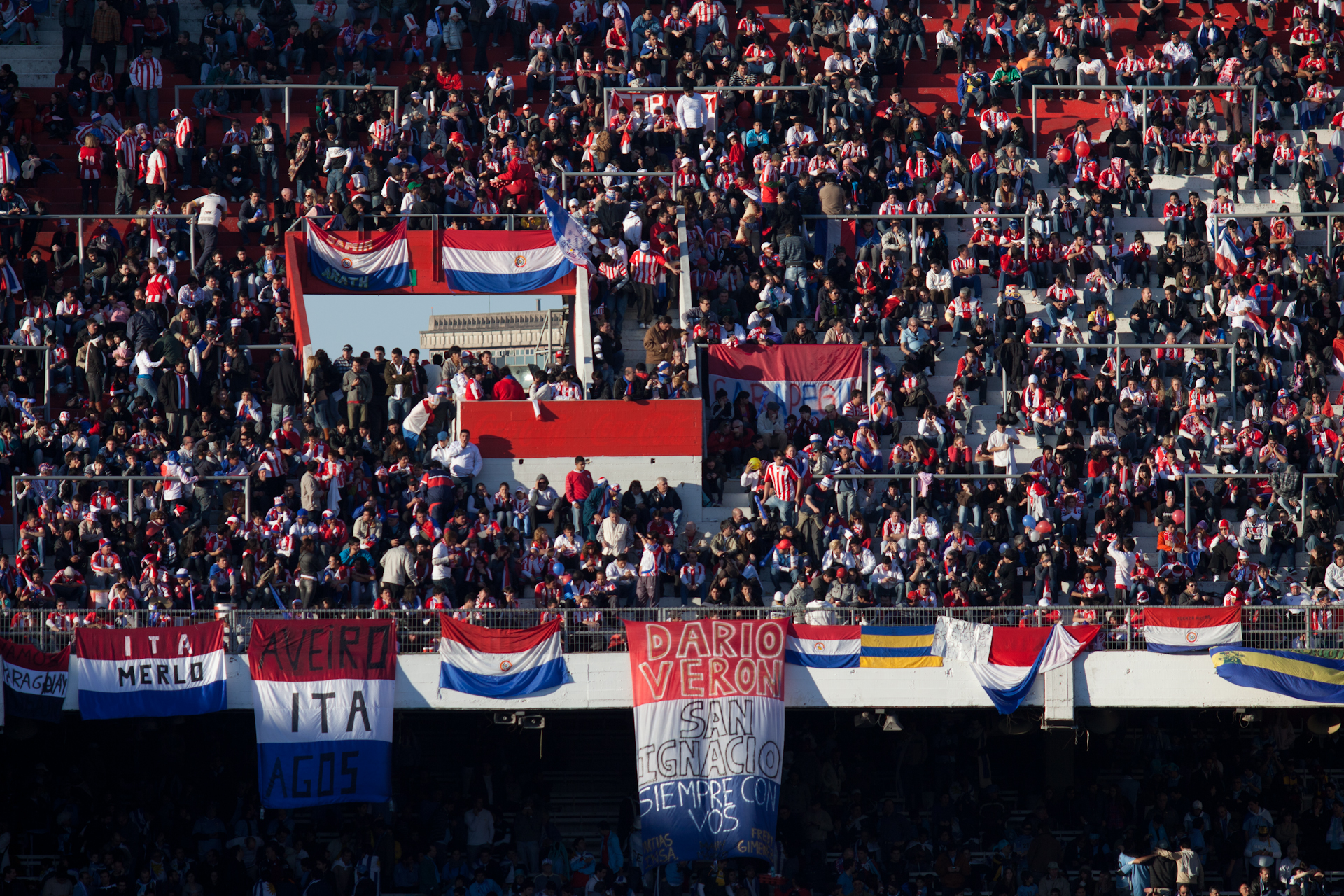
Paraguayan fans at the 2011 Copa América final

The Albirroja participated in seven friendly matches prior to the 2011 Copa América would commence in July, were Paraguay were drawn into Group B with Brazil, Venezuela and Ecuador. Gerardo Martino included with him new players such as Marcos Cáceres, Marcelo Estigarribia, Hernán Pérez, Osvaldo Martínez, Pablo Zeballos and Iván Piris, who were all participating in their first major competition at international level. The competition itself being held in Argentina was an advantage to Paraguay, due to the Paraguayan population in the host country. Paraguay would draw their opening group stage match 0–0 with Ecuador before facing the Copa América defending champions Brazil in their second group stage fixture. Paraguay would face Brazil on 9 July at the Estadio Mario Alberto Kempes in Córdoba. After trailing 1–0 at half time, a cross was played through to Roque Santa Cruz from the wing as the striker side footed the equalizer in the 54th minute. Santa Cruz was replaced by Nelson Valdez in the 56th minute, and ten minutes later Valdez would score for Paraguay, given them a 2–1 lead in the 66th minute. The scores were leveled 2–2 by Fred in the 89th minute, as Paraguay would settle for their second consecutive draw of the tournament. On 13 July, Paraguay played out a 3–3 draw with Venezuela, in a match which saw goals from Antolin Alcaraz, Lucas Barrios and an 85th-minute goal from Cristian Riveros, which had Paraguay 3–1 in front. However, Venezuela would score in both the 89th and 92nd minute of the match to draw at 3–3. Paraguay concluded the group stage phase with three points from three matches, as the group's third-place finisher and the competition's second-best third-place finisher in the group stage. Paraguay were drawn against Brazil at the quarter final stages, where the match was played at the Estadio Ciudad de La Plata on 17 July. After a 0–0 after 120 minutes, which saw two red cards (to Lucas Leiva and Antolín Alcaraz in the 103rd minute), the match was decided via a penalty shoot out. Brazil failed to convert all of their four spot kicks as Paraguay, who had seen Édgar Barreto miss his spot kick, converted two out of their three penalties, when both Marcelo Estigarribia and Cristian Riveros scored from the spot, to win the penalty shoot out 2–0. Paraguay then faced Venezuela in the semi-final on 20 July. Roque Santa Cruz, who was carrying an injury, had been substituted onto the field in the 73rd minute for Nelson Valdez, but then replaced in the 80th minute for Osvaldo Martínez. Jonathan Santana received his second yellow card of the match in the 102nd minute as the fixture ended 0–0 after extra time. Paraguay eventually won 5–3 via their second consecutive penalty shoot out, which saw Néstor Ortigoza, Lucas Barrios, Cristian Riveros, Osvaldo Martínez and Darío Verón score five out of their five spot kicks to send Paraguay to the 2011 Copa América final.

===== Final =====
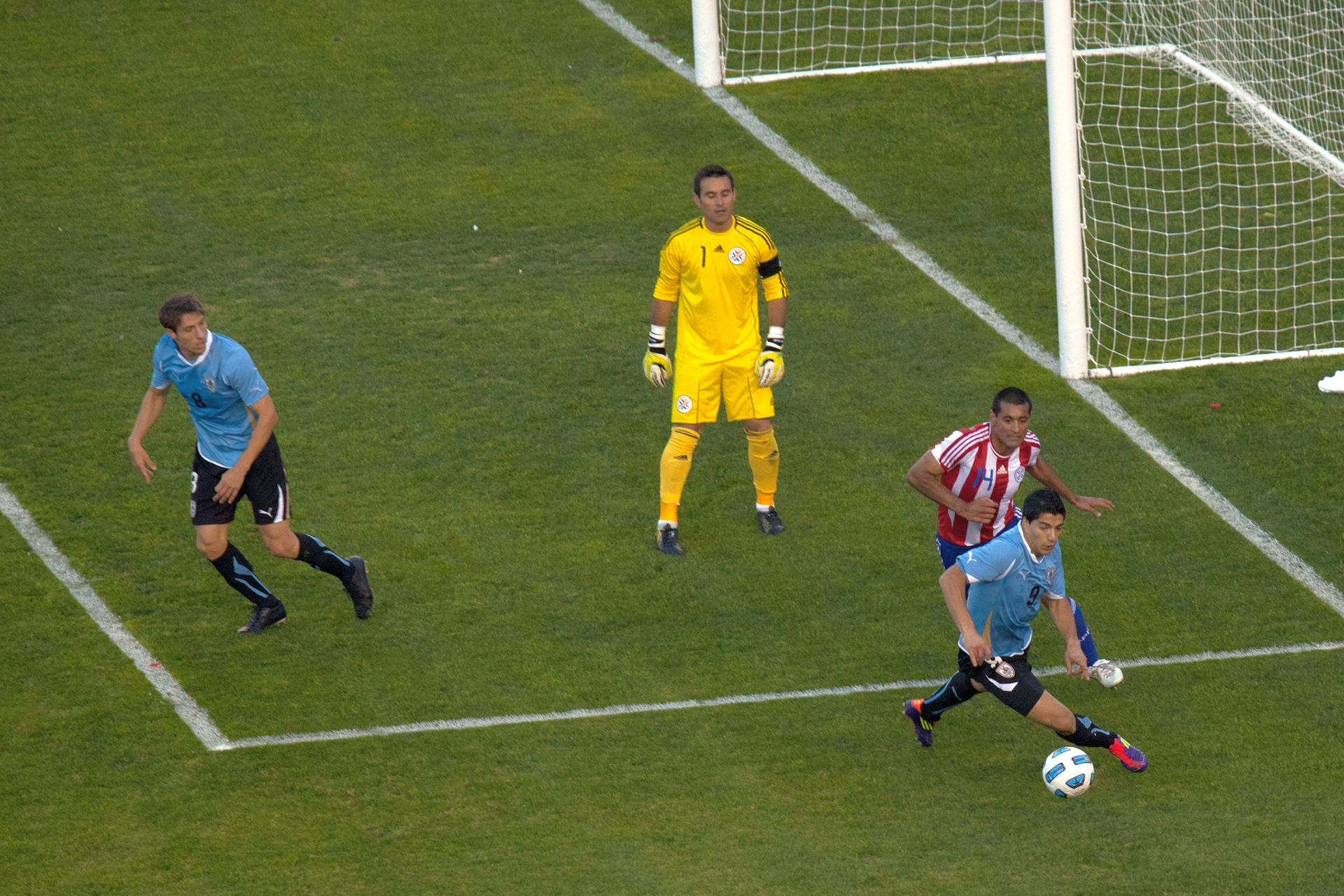
Paraguayan goalkeeper Justo Villar was awarded as the best goalkeeper of the tournament.

On 24 July, Paraguay faced Uruguay in the 2011 Copa América final. The fixture was played at River Plate's Estadio Monumental. It would be the first time that Paraguay would reach the final since the 1979 Copa América, which was the year in which they obtained their second Copa América title, as Paraguay had drawn five consecutive matches in order to make the final, without winning a single fixture. Paraguay suffered a difficult first half with Uruguay's Luis Suárez scoring in the 11th minute and Diego Forlán scoring in the 41st minute. Paraguay attacked with Nelson Valdez, who endured a full 90-minutes, playing up front as a center forward. Lucas Barrios, who had also acquired himself an injury, was substituted onto the field for Pablo Zeballos in the 76th minute, but damaged his hamstring in the last moments of the match. The match was decided in the 89th minute when Forlán scored for Uruguay to make it 3–0. Paraguayan goalkeeper Justo Villar was awarded as the Best goalkeeper of the tournament. Roque Santa Cruz played no part in the fixture due to injury. Gerardo Martino resigned soon afterwards as coach of the Albirroja.

=== 2011 and beyond ===
==== 2014 FIFA World Cup qualification ====
Pos	Team	Pld	W	D	L	GF	GA	GD	Pts	Qualification
1	Argentina	16	9	5	2	35	15	+20	32	2014 FIFA World Cup
2	Colombia	16	9	3	4	27	13	+14	30	2014 FIFA World Cup
3	Chile	16	9	1	6	29	25	+4	28	2014 FIFA World Cup
4	Ecuador	16	7	4	5	20	16	+4	25	2014 FIFA World Cup
5	Uruguay	16	7	4	5	25	25	0	25	Inter-confederation play-offs
6	Venezuela	16	5	5	6	14	20	−6	20	
7	Peru	16	4	3	9	17	26	−9	15	
8	Bolivia	16	2	6	8	17	30	−13	12	
9	Paraguay	16	3	3	10	17	31	−14	12	

Source: FIFA

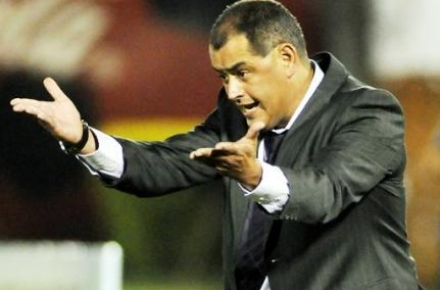
Former Paraguayan footballer Francisco Arce was in charge of the Albirroja in 2011, following the departure of Gerardo Martino.

After the resignation of Gerardo Martino, former Paraguayan footballer Francisco Arce would take charge of the national team for the qualifiers. In Rounds 1 and 2 in October 2011, Arce selected a strong and experienced squad to face Peru and Uruguay. Experienced players such as Roque Santa Cruz, Nelson Valdez, Carlos Bonet, Cristian Riveros, Paulo da Silva, Édgar Barreto and Darío Verón were included. Despite this, however, Paraguay were defeated 2–0 away in Lima as Paolo Guerrero scored a double for Peru on 7 October. Four days later, Paraguay drew with Uruguay in Asunción on 11 October. Diego Forlán scored in the 68th minute to give the visitors the lead, before Richard Ortiz equalized for Paraguay in the 92nd minute. Ortiz had converted the ball into the net after the ball had arrived in the 12-yard box from a corner kick, the match concluded 1–1. Paraguay were in eighth position of the table after Round 2. Rounds 3 and 4 took place in November 2011. Paraguay earned their first win of the qualifiers when they faced Ecuador on 11 November. Cristian Riveros scored in the 47th minute of the match, latching on to a free-kick. Darío Verón then scored his first international goal for Paraguay, heading home from a corner kick in the 57th minute. Ecuador then scored a consolation goal in the 92nd minute, however, the fixture ended 2–1 and Paraguay moved up to fourth position in the table. Fourth position was the highest ranking that Paraguay would eventually achieve throughout the duration of qualifiers, as the national team would face a series of several loses, both home and away. Four days after Paraguay's win against Ecuador, they were defeated 2–0 against Chile in Santiago on 15 November. 2010 FIFA World Cup and 2011 Copa América veterans Enrique Vera and Aureliano Torres had not been called up to the national team since the qualifiers had commenced, and Diego Barreto had been selected as the number #1 goalkeeper throughout the first four rounds of the qualifiers. Paraguay's first match of the qualifiers in 2012 came in June against Bolivia. A 3–1 away defeat in La Paz, which saw a double from Bolivia's Pablo Daniel Escobar, a Paraguayan who had obtained Bolivian citizenship. Cristian Riveros scored for the Albirroja in the 81st minute as the national team again dropped down to eighth position of the table. The fixture saw the return of both Justo Villar and Aureliano Torres to the qualifiers. Francisco Arce departed as coach in 2012, after Paraguay's 3–1 away loss against Bolivia, and was replaced by Uruguayan Gerardo Pelusso. On 5 August 2012, Egar Barreto announced his international retirement from the Albirroja due to fatigue from intercontinental travelling for national team matches. He cited that the travelling takes away much energy as the Italian Serie A championship is long and exhausting. In Round 7, Paraguay were defeated 3–1 against Argentina away in Córdoba on 7 September 2012. Argentina had been in the top three positions of the table throughout the qualifiers and commenced the match with a goal in the third minute, scored by Ángel Di María. Argentine-born Paraguayan striker Jonathan Fabbro equalized for the Albirroja in the 17th minute after scoring a penalty, however, goals from Gonzalo Higuaín and Lionel Messi took the scoreline to 3–1 as Paraguay were defeated for the third consecutive time in the qualifiers. Paraguay were placed at the bottom of the table in ninth position, and would eventually remain there until Round 15. Four days later, Paraguay suffered a 2–0 home defeat against Venezuela in Asunción on 11 September. Salomón Rondón scored a double for the away team as Paraguay lost their fourth qualifier in a row. In Round 9, Paraguay were defeated 2–0 away in Barranquilla as Colombia's Radamel Falcao scored two second half goals, on 12 October. Four days later, Paraguay ended their losing streak when they defeated Peru 1–0 in Asunción on 16 October. Pablo Aguilar scored for the home side in the 52nd minute to give the Albirroja only their second win of the qualifiers. In Paraguay's first qualifier for 2013, they faced Uruguay in Montevideo on 22 March. The scores were locked at 0–0 for the entire match until Luis Suárez scored in the 81st minute to give Uruguay the lead. Édgar Benítez equalized for Paraguay in the 85th minute as the fixture concluded 1–1. On 26 March, Paraguay were defeated 4–1 away in Quito against Ecuador, four days later. Paraguay had been in front after Luis Caballero scored in the 15th minute, however, Ecuador responded with four goals, including a second half double from Jefferson Montero.

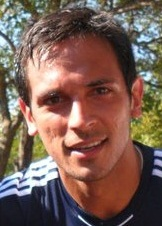
In Round 13 of the qualifiers, Roque Santa Cruz scored his 26th national team goal, becoming the leading goal scorer in the history of the Paraguay national team.

In Round 13, Paraguay faced Chile in Asunción on 7 June. Chile were leading 2–0 until Roque Santa Cruz was substituted onto the field in the 58th minute for Dante López. Santa Cruz was a key figure in the match for the remaining half-hour of the second half, eventually scoring in the 87th minute to take the score line to 2–1, which was the way that the match concluded. The goal brought his tally to 26 which made him the all-time leading goal scorer of the Paraguay national team's history. In Paraguay's next fixture in Round 15, they hosted Bolivia in Asunción on 6 September. By this time, Gerardo Pelusso had departed and Paraguay's under-20 team coach Víctor Genes would ultimately be in charge until the qualifiers were concluded. Santa Cruz was again present with the squad and also served as the national team captain for the last four fixtures of the campaign. Jonathan Fabbro scored in the 16th minute for Paraguay to give the home side a 1–0 lead. At the start of the second half, Roque Santa Cruz scored a header in the 47th minute, extending his tally to 27 goals for the national team and giving Paraguay a 2–0 lead. Paraguay then scored two more goals during the second half in the 80th and 83rd minutes, coming from Richard Ortiz and Gustavo Gómez, to give Paraguay a 4–0 home victory. After the round had concluded, the victory took Paraguay from ninth position to eighth position of the table, in a bid to restore hope to at least reach the play-offs of the qualifiers. However, four days later, a 5–2 defeat against Argentina in Asunción would officially declare Paraguay's elimination from reaching the top five teams of the CONMEBOL table. Paraguay again dropped to ninth position of the table. The match saw Lionel Messi score a double, as well as Roque Santa Cruz scoring in the 85th minute, bringing his tally to 28 goals for the national team. Paraguay's last two matches in October 2013 saw then face Venezuela and Colombia. Édgar Benítez gave Paraguay a 1–0 lead in the 28th minute of the first half away in San Cristóbal, however, Venezuela's Luis Manuel Seijas equalized in the 82nd minute as the match concluded 1–1 on 11 October. Despite the loss, Paraguay had moved back up again to eighth position. In Paraguay's last fixture of the qualifiers in Round 18, they faced Colombia in Asunción on 15 October. Jorge Rojas opened the scoring for Paraguay in the 7th minute, however, a double from Mario Yepes gave Colombia a 2–1 victory. Paraguay again dropped down to ninth position of the table, having gained just 12 points from three wins during the qualifiers and having been defeated ten times. The 2014 FIFA World Cup qualification campaign proved to be one of the Albirroja's most unsuccessful campaign. Throughout the duration of the qualifiers, Paraguay's coaching position was modified three times in the space of the entire 24-month period. Paraguay failed to qualify for their fourth consecutive FIFA World Cup finals, and a third consecutive FIFA World Cup competition held inside their own continent (having not appeared at the 1962 FIFA World Cup held in Chile and the 1978 FIFA World Cup held in Argentina).

==== 2015 Copa América ====
Paraguay's campaign in the 2015 Copa América was much more successful than their qualifying campaign to Brazil. In this competition, Paraguay made it to the semi-finals, defeating Brazil in quarter-finals via penalty shootouts, after the score being 1-1, although they were eliminated by Argentina, by a score of 6–1.

Group B
Pos	Team	Pld	W	D	L	GF	GA	GD	Pts	Qualification
1	Argentina	3	2	1	0	4	2	+2	7	Advance to knockout stage
2	Paraguay	3	1	2	0	4	3	+1	5	Advance to knockout stage
3	Uruguay	3	1	1	1	2	2	0	4	Advance to knockout stage
4	Jamaica	3	0	0	3	0	3	−3	0	

Source: CONMEBOL
Rules for classification: Tie-breaking criteria

==== 2016 Copa América Centenario ====
Group A
Pos	Team	Pld	W	D	L	GF	GA	GD	Pts	Qualification
1	United States (H)	3	2	0	1	5	2	+3	6	Advance to knockout stage
2	Colombia	3	2	0	1	6	4	+2	6	Advance to knockout stage
3	Costa Rica	3	1	1	1	3	6	−3	4	
4	Paraguay	3	0	1	2	1	3	−2	1	

Source: CONMEBOL & CONCACAF
Rules for classification: Group stage tiebreakers
(H) Hosts

Prior to the competition, the Paraguayan press had labeled Roque Santa Cruz, Nelson Haedo, Paulo da Silva and Justo Villar as histórics, being the only four experienced and veteran players in the squad selected for the competition. Santa Cruz suffered an injured and was later replaced by Antonio Sanabria.

Following an unsuccessful campaign, Ramón Díaz announced his resignation as coach of the Albirroja in a press conference at the Estadio Defensores del Chaco after returning to the country. The mentioned coach, however, had already received criticism from former Albirroja great José Luís Chilavert, who stated that the team is managed with 'friendship' due to the corruption in the APF and claimed that Díaz is more of an office person.

Concluding, former Albirroja leading goal scorer and coach of Chiapas in Mexico, José Cardozo, expressed his dissatisfaction with the Albirroja. He said "there are players that do not even know our national anthem". "We used to play until we would suffer severe injuries and we performed because we loved the Albirroja. Today, someone has pain in their stomach and does not want to train". "Carlos Gamarra and Francisco Arce played many times with busted ankles and I once played with a damaged knee" remembered Cardozo. Former Albirroja World Cup veteran Celso Ayala spoke to HOY.com and mentioned that "any team beats us. In the Albirroja, we've stopped kicking, blocking and heading. Uruguay for instance never forgets about its roots and we have to be like them".

== Managers ==
Dates	Name
1921	(Argentina) José Durand Laguna
1922–26	(Paraguay) Manuel Fleitas
1942–43	(Paraguay) Manuel Fleitas
1945	(Argentina) José Durand Laguna
1945–46	(Paraguay) Aurelio González
1947–53	(Paraguay) Manuel Fleitas
1954	(Italy) Vessilio Bartoli
1955	(Paraguay) César López Fretes
1955	(Paraguay) Luis Magín Gómez
1956	(Paraguay) Julio Ramírez
1957–59	(Paraguay) Aurelio González
1959	(Paraguay) Benjamín Laterza
1960	(Paraguay) Eduardo López Morán

Dates	Name
1960–61	(Paraguay) Aurelio González
1962	(Paraguay) Fulgencio Romero
1963	(Uruguay) Ondino Viera
1964–65	(Paraguay) Manuel Fleitas
1966	(Paraguay) Aurelio González
1967	(Paraguay) Benjamín Fernández
1967–68	(Paraguay) Aurelio González
1969	(Uruguay) José María Rodríguez
1970	(Paraguay) Benjamín Laterza
1970–72	(Paraguay) Aurelio González
1973	(Brazil) Paulo Amaral
1973	(Uruguay) Washington Etchamendi
1974	(Paraguay) Aurelio González

Dates	Name
1974–75	(Uruguay) José María Rodríguez
1976–77	(Paraguay) Ramón Rodríguez
1979	(Paraguay) Luis Magín Gómez
1979–80	(Paraguay) Ranulfo Miranda
1981	(Uruguay) José María Rodríguez
1983	(Paraguay) Ramón Rodríguez
1985–87	(Paraguay) Cayetano Ré
1987	(Paraguay) Juan Francisco Rivera
1987	(Paraguay) José Parodi
1988–89	(Argentina) Eduardo Luján Manera
1990	(Spain) Óscar Valdez
1991–92	(Paraguay) Carlos Kiese
1992–93	(Uruguay) Sergio Markarián

Dates	Name
1993	(Argentina) Héctor Corte
1993	(Paraguay) Alicio Solalinde
1993	(Brazil) Valdir Espinosa
1993–94	(Paraguay) Alicio Solalinde
1995	(Hungary) László Kubala
1996	(Paraguay) Gerardo González
1996–98	(Brazil) Paulo César Carpegiani
1998	(Paraguay) Julio Carlos Gómez
1998–99	(Uruguay) Ever Hugo Almeida
1999–2001	(Uruguay) Sergio Markarián
2001	(Paraguay) Víctor Genes
2001–02	(Italy) Cesare Maldini
2002–06	(Uruguay) Aníbal Ruiz

Dates	Name
2006	(Paraguay) Raúl Vicente Amarilla
2006–11	(Argentina) Gerardo Martino
2011–12	(Paraguay) Francisco Arce
2012–13	(Uruguay) Gerardo Pelusso
2013–14	(Paraguay) Víctor Genes
2014–16	(Argentina) Ramón Díaz
2016–17	(Paraguay) Francisco Arce
2018	(Paraguay) Gustavo Morinigo (Interim)
2018–19	(Colombia) Juan Carlos Osorio
2019–21	(Argentina) Eduardo Berizzo
2021–23	(Argentina) Guillermo Barros Schelotto
2023–24	(Argentina) Daniel Garnero
2024–	(Argentina) Gustavo Alfaro

== Previous squads ==
FIFA World Cup

- 1930 FIFA World Cup squad
- 1950 FIFA World Cup squad
- 1958 FIFA World Cup squad
- 1986 FIFA World Cup squad
- 1998 FIFA World Cup squad
- 2002 FIFA World Cup squad
- 2006 FIFA World Cup squad
- 2010 FIFA World Cup squad
- 2026 FIFA World Cup squad

Copa América

- 1921 South American Championship squad
- 1922 South American Championship squad
- 1923 South American Championship squad
- 1924 South American Championship squad
- 1925 South American Championship squad
- 1926 South American Championship squad
- 1929 South American Championship squad
- 1937 South American Championship squad
- 1939 South American Championship squad
- 1942 South American Championship squad
- 1946 South American Championship squad
- 1947 South American Championship squad
- 1949 South American Championship squad
- 1953 South American Championship squad
- 1955 South American Championship squad
- 1956 South American Championship squad
- 1959 South American Championship (Argentina) squad
- 1959 South American Championship (Ecuador) squad
- 1963 South American Championship squad
- 1967 South American Championship squad
- 1975 Copa América squad
- 1979 Copa América squad
- 1983 Copa América squad
- 1987 Copa América squad
- 1989 Copa América squad
- 1991 Copa América squad
- 1993 Copa América squad
- 1995 Copa América squad
- 1997 Copa América squad
- 1999 Copa América squad
- 2001 Copa América squad
- 2004 Copa América squad
- 2007 Copa América squad
- 2011 Copa América squad
- 2015 Copa América squad
- 2016 Copa América squad
- 2019 Copa América squad
- 2021 Copa América squad
- 2024 Copa América squad
