= 2007 Copa América Group C =

Football tournament group stage

Group C of the 2007 Copa América was one of the three groups of competing nations in the 2007 Copa América. It comprised Argentina, Colombia, Paraguay and invitee United States. The group matches ran from 28 June to 5 July 2007.

Argentina and Paraguay advanced from the group to the knockout phase.

== Standings ==
Team	Pld	W	D	L	GF	GA	GD	Pts
Argentina	3	3	0	0	9	3	+6	9
Paraguay	3	2	0	1	8	2	+6	6
Colombia	3	1	0	2	3	9	−6	3
United States	3	0	0	3	2	8	−6	0

== Matches ==
All times are in local, Venezuela Time (UTC−04:00).

=== Paraguay v Colombia ===
28 June 2007
18:35

Paraguay	5–0	Colombia
Santa Cruz 30', 46', 80'; Cabañas 84', 88'	Report

Estadio José Pachencho Romero, Maracaibo
Attendance: 34,500
Referee: Jorge Larrionda (Uruguay)

Paraguay	Colombia

GK	1	Justo Villar (c)
CB	2	Darío Verón
CB	5	Julio César Cáceres
CB	14	Paulo da Silva
DM	16	Cristian Riveros
RM	6	Carlos Bonet
CM	8	Édgar Barreto
CM	19	Jonathan Santana	(substituted off) 78'
LM	3	Claudio Morel
CF	9	Roque Santa Cruz	(substituted off) 83'
CF	18	Óscar Cardozo	(substituted off) 70'
Substitutions:
FW	7	Salvador Cabañas	(substituted on) 70'
MF	20	Enrique Vera	(substituted on) 78'
FW	17	Dante López	(substituted on) 83'
Manager:
(Argentina) Gerardo Martino

GK	1	Miguel Calero (c)
RB	4	Gerardo Vallejo
CB	2	Iván Córdoba
CB	3	Mario Yepes
LB	5	Javier Arizala	(substituted off) 63'
DM	15	Jhon Viáfara
RM	9	Álvaro Domínguez	(substituted off) 56'
CM	6	Fabián Vargas
LM	8	David Ferreira
CF	7	Edixon Perea
CF	11	Hugo Rodallega	(substituted off) 76'
Substitutions:
MF	20	Macnelly Torres	(substituted on) 56'
DF	13	Vladimir Marín	(substituted on) 63'
FW	18	Luis Gabriel Rey	(substituted on) 76'
Manager:
Jorge Luis Pinto

=== Argentina v United States ===
28 June 2007
20:50

Argentina	4–1	United States
Crespo 11', 60'; Aimar 76'; Tevez 84'	Report	Johnson 9' (pen.)

Estadio José Pachencho Romero, Maracaibo
Attendance: 34,500
Referee: Carlos Chandía (Chile)

Argentina	United States

GK	1	Roberto Abbondanzieri
RB	8	Javier Zanetti
CB	2	Roberto Ayala (c)
CB	15	Gabriel Milito	(yellow card) 58'
LB	6	Gabriel Heinze
DM	19	Esteban Cambiasso		(substituted off) 58'
DM	14	Javier Mascherano
CM	20	Juan Sebastián Verón		(substituted off) 87'
AM	18	Lionel Messi		(substituted off) 79'
AM	10	Juan Román Riquelme
CF	9	Hernán Crespo
Substitutions:
MF	16	Pablo Aimar		(substituted on) 58'
FW	11	Carlos Tevez		(substituted on) 79'
MF	5	Fernando Gago		(substituted on) 87'
Manager:
Alfio Basile

GK	18	Kasey Keller (c)
RB	2	Marvell Wynne
CB	3	Jay DeMerit
CB	12	Jimmy Conrad
LB	13	Jonathan Bornstein	(yellow card) 73'
RM	14	Ben Olsen		(substituted off) 62'
CM	19	Ricardo Clark		(substituted off) 80'
CM	5	Benny Feilhaber
LM	21	Justin Mapp
SS	9	Eddie Johnson
CF	20	Taylor Twellman		(substituted off) 69'
Substitutions:
FW	11	Eddie Gaven		(substituted on) 62'
FW	8	Herculez Gomez		(substituted on) 69'
MF	17	Kyle Beckerman		(substituted on) 80'
Manager:
Bob Bradley

=== United States v Paraguay ===
2 July 2007
18:35

United States	1–3	Paraguay
Clark 35'	Report	Barreto 29'; Cardozo 56'; Cabañas 90+2'

Estadio Agustín Tovar, Barinas
Attendance: 28,200
Referee: Victor Rivera (Peru)

United States	Paraguay

GK	18	Kasey Keller (c)
CB	15	Drew Moor
CB	3	Jay DeMerit		(substituted off) 64'
CB	12	Jimmy Conrad
RM	14	Ben Olsen		(substituted off) 71'
CM	19	Ricardo Clark
CM	5	Benny Feilhaber	(yellow card) 61'
LM	13	Jonathan Bornstein
AM	16	Sacha Kljestan		(substituted off) 80'
CF	9	Eddie Johnson
CF	20	Taylor Twellman
Substitutions:
DF	7	Danny Califf		(substituted on) 64'
MF	21	Justin Mapp		(substituted on) 71'
MF	25	Lee Nguyen		(substituted on) 80'
Manager:
Bob Bradley

GK	1	Justo Villar (c)		(substituted off) 54'
CB	2	Darío Verón
CB	5	Julio César Cáceres
CB	14	Paulo da Silva
DM	16	Cristian Riveros	(yellow card) 77'
RM	6	Carlos Bonet
CM	8	Édgar Barreto
CM	19	Jonathan Santana		(substituted off) 77'
LM	3	Claudio Morel
CF	9	Roque Santa Cruz
CF	18	Óscar Cardozo		(substituted off) 73'
Substitutions:
GK	22	Aldo Bobadilla		(substituted on) 54'
FW	7	Salvador Cabañas		(substituted on) 73'
MF	20	Enrique Vera		(substituted on) 77'
Manager:
(Argentina) Gerardo Martino

=== Argentina v Colombia ===
2 July 2007
20:50

Argentina	4–2	Colombia
Crespo 20' (pen.); Riquelme 34', 45'; D. Milito 90+1'	Report	E. Perea 10'; Castrillón 76'

Estadio José Pachencho Romero, Maracaibo
Attendance: 40,000
Referee: Carlos Simon (Brazil)

Argentina	Colombia

GK	1	Roberto Abbondanzieri
RB	8	Javier Zanetti
CB	2	Roberto Ayala (c)
CB	15	Gabriel Milito	(yellow card) 13'
LB	6	Gabriel Heinze
DM	19	Esteban Cambiasso
DM	14	Javier Mascherano
CM	20	Juan Sebastián Verón	(yellow card) 69'	(substituted off) 80'
AM	18	Lionel Messi		(substituted off) 84'
AM	10	Juan Román Riquelme
CF	9	Hernán Crespo		(substituted off) 21'
Substitutions:
FW	21	Diego Milito		(substituted on) 21'
MF	13	Lucho González		(substituted on) 80'
FW	11	Carlos Tevez		(substituted on) 84'
Manager:
Alfio Basile

GK	1	Miguel Calero (c)
RB	4	Gerardo Vallejo
CB	2	Iván Córdoba
CB	14	Luis Perea	(yellow card) 14'
LB	5	Javier Arizala	(yellow card) 16'
DM	15	Jhon Viáfara		(substituted off) 61'
DM	21	Jorge Banguero	(yellow card) 79'
CM	6	Fabián Vargas	(yellow card) 54' (yellow-red card) 90'
AM	7	Edixon Perea		(substituted off) 67'
AM	11	Hugo Rodallega
CF	8	David Ferreira		(substituted off) 76'
Substitutions:
MF	17	Jaime Castrillón		(substituted on) 61'
MF	10	Andrés Chitiva		(substituted on) 67'
MF	20	Macnelly Torres		(substituted on) 76'
Manager:
Jorge Luis Pinto

=== Colombia v United States ===
5 July 2007
18:35

Colombia	1–0	United States
Castrillón 15'	Report

Estadio Metropolitano de Fútbol de Lara, Barquisimeto
Attendance: 37,500
Referee: Manuel Andarcia (Venezuela)

Colombia	United States

GK	12	Róbinson Zapata	(yellow card) 72' (yellow-red card) 87'
RB	22	Camilo Zúñiga
CB	14	Luis Perea (c)	(yellow card) 42'
CB	3	Mario Yepes
LB	5	Javier Arizala
DM	15	Jhon Viáfara		(substituted off) 55'
DM	21	Jorge Banguero
CM	8	Jaime Castrillón
AM	19	César Valoyes	(yellow card) 78'	(substituted off) 78'
AM	11	Hugo Rodallega (Note: Hugo Rodallega played as a goalkeeper after Róbinson Zapata was sent off.)
CF	20	Macnelly Torres		(substituted off) 85'
Substitutions:
DF	13	Vladimir Marín		(substituted on) 55'
MF	10	Andrés Chitiva		(substituted on) 78'
MF	8	David Ferreira		(substituted on) 85'
Manager:
Jorge Luis Pinto

GK	23	Brad Guzan
RB	15	Drew Moor	(yellow card) 2'
CB	7	Danny Califf (c)
CB	17	Kyle Beckerman
LB	4	Bobby Boswell
CM	21	Justin Mapp		(substituted off) 65'
CM	19	Ricardo Clark
CM	6	Heath Pearce
AM	16	Sacha Kljestan	(yellow card) 32'
CF	9	Eddie Johnson		(substituted off) 72'
CF	8	Herculez Gomez		(substituted off) 46'
Substitutions:
FW	11	Eddie Gaven		(substituted on) 46'
FW	10	Charlie Davies		(substituted on) 65'
MF	25	Lee Nguyen		(substituted on) 72'
Manager:
Bob Bradley

=== Argentina v Paraguay ===
5 July 2007
20:50

Argentina	1–0	Paraguay
Mascherano 79'	Report

Estadio Metropolitano de Fútbol de Lara, Barquisimeto
Attendance: 37,500
Referee: Jorge Larrionda (Uruguay)

Argentina	Paraguay

GK	1	Roberto Abbondanzieri
RB	4	Hugo Ibarra
CB	3	Cata Díaz
CB	17	Nicolás Burdisso	(yellow card) 74'
LB	8	Javier Zanetti (c)
DM	19	Esteban Cambiasso		(substituted off) 67'
DM	5	Fernando Gago
CM	13	Lucho González		(substituted off) 66'
AM	7	Rodrigo Palacio	(yellow card) 90+2'
AM	16	Pablo Aimar		(substituted off) 85'
CF	11	Carlos Tevez
Substitutions:
MF	14	Javier Mascherano		(substituted on) 66'
FW	18	Lionel Messi		(substituted on) 67'
DF	2	Roberto Ayala		(substituted on) 85'
Manager:
Alfio Basile

GK	22	Aldo Bobadilla
RB	2	Darío Verón
CB	5	Julio César Cáceres (c)
CB	20	Enrique Vera
LB	4	Julio Manzur
CM	15	Édgar González	(yellow card) 9'
CM	10	Julio dos Santos		(substituted off) 69'
CM	19	Jonathan Santana	(yellow card) 39'	(substituted off) 81'
RF	21	Nelson Cuevas		(substituted off) 58'
CF	7	Salvador Cabañas
LF	11	Aureliano Torres
Substitutions:
FW	17	Dante López		(substituted on) 58'
MF	8	Édgar Barreto	(yellow card) 90'	(substituted on) 69'
FW	9	Roque Santa Cruz		(substituted on) 81'
Manager:
(Argentina) Gerardo Martino
