= Javier Arizala =

Colombian footballer (born 1984)

Personal information
- Full name: Javier Eduardo Arizala Caicedo
- Date of birth: April 21, 1984 (age 42)
- Place of birth: Nariño, Cundinamarca, Colombia
- Height: 1.87 m (6 ft 2 in)
- Position: Left back

Team information
- Current team: León de Huánuco
- Number: 30

Youth career
- 1995–2001: América de Cali

Senior career*
Years	Team	Apps	(Gls)
2001–2003	Corporacion Tulua	40	(5)
2003	Atlético Nacional	11	(2)
2004	Tolima	6	(0)
2005	Quindío	1	(0)
2005–2006	Deportivo Pasto	26	(3)
2006	Racing Club	4	(0)
2007	Tolima	28	(3)
2008–2011	Santa Fe	41	(0)
2011–2012	Itagüí	21	(0)
2013	León de Huánuco	13	(0)

International career^{‡}
2003–2007	Colombia	21	(0)
- * Club domestic league appearances and goals as of 15:48, 21 April 2013 (UTC) ‡ National team caps and goals as of 17:34, 17 February 2010 (UTC)

Javier Arizala (born April 21, 1984) is a Colombian footballer. He played as a left-defender or midfielder, for León de Huánuco of the Torneo Descentralizado in Peru.

Arizala played for the Colombia national team at leftback for all the games in Copa America 2007 as well as all the friendlies played under coach Jorge Luis Pinto. He was part of the 4th-place finishing U-20 team in the 2003 FIFA World Youth Championship.
