= Jorge Banguero =

Colombian footballer (born 1974)

Personal information
- Full name: Jorge Eliecer Banguero
- Date of birth: October 4, 1974 (age 52)
- Place of birth: Cali, Valle del Cauca, Colombia
- Height: 6 ft 2 in (1.88 m)
- Position: Defensive midfielder

International career
Years	Team	Apps	(Gls)
2002–2007	Colombia	9	(0)

Jorge Eliecer Banguero Viafára (born October 4, 1974) is a Colombian footballer. He plays as a defensive midfielder.

Banguero's former clubs include Millonarios, Deportes Tolima, Deportivo Pasto and Real Cartagena.

He played for the Colombia national football team at Copa America 2007.
