= Salvador Cabañas =

Paraguayan footballer (born 1980)

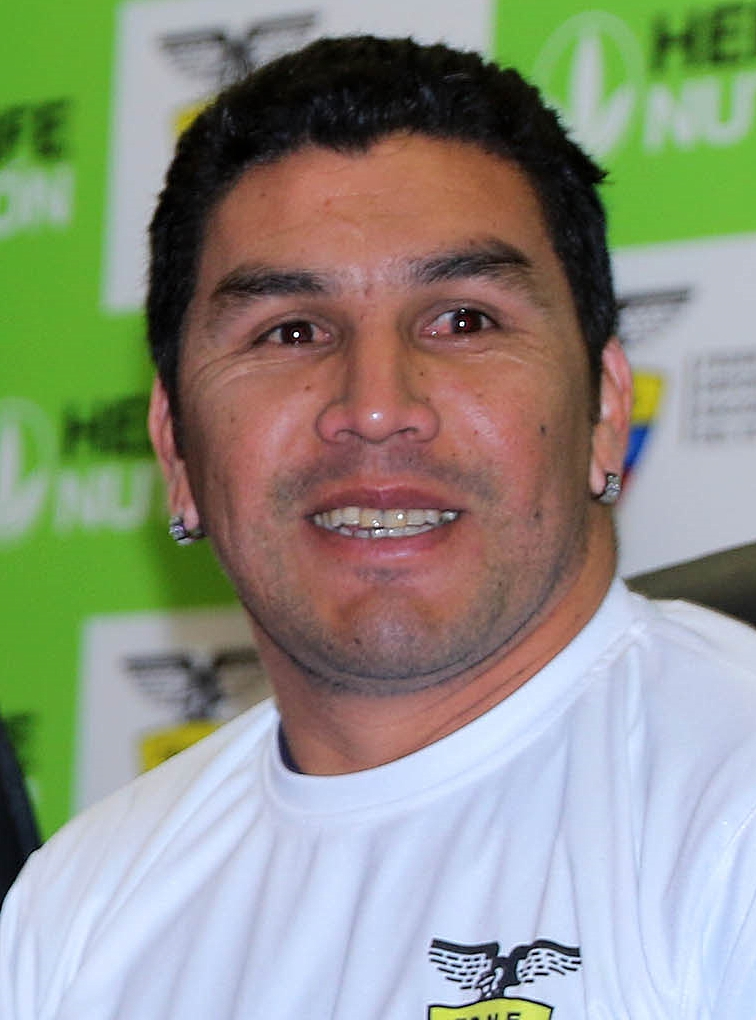
- Cabañas in 2016

Personal information
- Full name: Salvador Cabañas Ortega
- Date of birth: 5 August 1980 (age 46)
- Place of birth: Asunción, Paraguay
- Height: 1.73 m (5 ft 8 in)
- Positions: Striker; winger

Senior career*
Years	Team	Apps	(Gls)
1998–2001	12 de Octubre	42	(12)
1999	→ Guaraní (loan)	20	(6)
2001–2003	Audax Italiano	53	(29)
2003–2006	Chiapas	103	(59)
2006–2010	América	115	(98)
2012	12 de Octubre	14	(0)
2014	Tanabi	0	(0)
Total		333	(172)

International career
1997	Paraguay U17		(3)
1999	Paraguay U20		(2)
2004–2009	Paraguay	44	(10)
- * Club domestic league appearances and goals

Salvador Cabañas Ortega (born 5 August 1980) is a Paraguayan former professional footballer who played as a striker.

Regarded as one of the finest Paraguayan footballers of his generation, Cabañas established himself as a prolific goalscorer, known for his blend of technical ability, physical strength, and exceptional positional awareness. He enjoyed his most successful years with Club América in Mexico's top division, where he finished as the league's top scorer in 2006. He was also the leading goalscorer in the Copa Libertadores in consecutive editions, topping the tournament's scoring charts in 2007 and 2008. His performances during this period earned him both the Paraguayan Footballer of the Year and South American Footballer of the Year awards.

At the international level, Cabañas represented the Paraguay national team, earning 44 caps and scoring 10 goals. He played a prominent role in major international competitions, including the 2006 FIFA World Cup and the 2007 Copa América.

His career was dramatically interrupted in January 2010 when he suffered a life-threatening gunshot wound. Following nearly two years of rehabilitation, he returned to professional football in January 2012. Although he resumed his playing career, he was unable to fully recover the form that had made him one of South America's most feared forwards prior to the incident.

== Club career ==
=== Early years ===
Cabañas started his career at Club 12 de Octubre, where he was promoted to the first division, by then-coach Alicio Solalinde, scoring 17 goals in his first season. He then moved to a different team, Guaraní, where he had a brief stint before moving to Audax Italiano of Chile. In the 2003 Apertura tournament of the Chilean Primera División, Cabañas was the top scorer with 18 goals.

=== Years in Mexico ===
Afterwards, he joined Chiapas of Mexico from Audax Italiano before the Mexican 2003 Apertura tournament. That season, Cabañas went on to play in 18 games for the team, scoring five goals. He came into his own in the 2004 Clausura however, as he scored 15 goals in 20 games for the club. He would lead the club in goals again in the 2004 Apertura, with eight in 16 matches.

Following the Clausura 2006 season in which Cabañas won his first goal-scoring crown in the Mexican League, he attracted the attention of Club América, one of the most important clubs in the country, and was signed by the Mexico City squad prior to the Apertura 2006 season.

Cabañas became Club América's most prolific goal scorer for 2007, finishing up the first half of the year with an impressive 19 goals between 2007 Copa Libertadores (in which he became the top-scorer with 10 goals) and the Mexican Primera División. He started the second half of the year with a single goal in the North American SuperLiga, then scored 4 more goals in the 2007 Copa Sudamericana, and has scored 9 more in the Mexican Primera División, bringing his year's total with the club to 33 goals. His top form in 2007 earned him the Paraguayan Footballer of the Year and South American Footballer of the Year awards.

For 2008, Cabañas has started where he left off in 2007. He scored 3 goals in the 2008 InterLiga, scored 8 in the 2008 Copa Libertadores (in which, for a consecutive second time, he became the top-scorer), and scored 6 more goals in the Mexican Primera División. He started the second half of the year with 6 goals in the Mexican Primera División, bringing his year's total to 23 goals with the club.

Cabañas started 2009 by scoring his first goal in the 2009 InterLiga and scoring 13 more goals in the Mexican Primera División. He then finished the second half of the year with 12 goals in the Mexican Primera División. Taking his tally to 26 goals for the year. On 18 January, against Santos Laguna, he scored two goals, taking his personal tally to 100 goals in the Mexican Primera División.

In 2010, Cabañas again started the year scoring goals in the 2010 InterLiga, scoring four. In the two games he played in the 2010 Bicentenario, he scored two goals. His last game before being shot was on 24 January 2010 in a 2–0 loss against Morelia.

=== Murder attempt ===
Cabañas was shot in the head inside the "Bar Bar" nightclub, in Mexico City, on 25 January 2010 at 5:00 a.m. According to the official police reports, the assault was the result of a taunting incident in the bar's bathroom between Cabañas and a mobster of the Beltrán-Leyva Drug-Cartel called José Balderas Garza, alias "JJ", who shot him.

According to Cabañas ex-wife, the altercation was a result of Cabañas reacting against a robbery.

Cabañas received medical attention during the early hours of 25 January 2010. Later on the day he was submitted to a craniotomy but doctors decided that it was too risky to proceed and the bullet was not extracted. Cabañas left intensive care in late February and was hoping to fully recover in time for the 2010 FIFA World Cup but was not selected for the final Paraguay squad. Doctors dealing with Cabañas have described his recovery so far as "tremendous". However, it is announced he does have short-term memory loss and may not recover for another one to three years. He gave his first interview on 12 March 2010 in appreciation to all the people who prayed for him. In 2013, Cabañas gave his version of the incident which stated that in his opinion the attack occurred so that he would not play at the 2010 FIFA World Cup and that Paraguay would not be crowned champions of the competition.

At that moment, Cabañas challenged the man, asking him 'What are you waiting for', noting to him that he had held the gun towards Cabañas for almost 10 minutes, and after a little bit, the man pulled the trigger on Cabañas shot his forehead. He also stated that right after being shot, he had a near-death experience, where he felt that he went directly to heaven and spoke with God, who touched him on his forehead where Cabañas had been shot, and told him that a long time remained until he was due to come to heaven and that he should enjoy life and help those in need.

=== Return to football ===
Cabañas signed a contract with Paraguayan third-division club 12 de Octubre, on 20 January 2012, two years after the assault. He then made his competitive return to football on 14 April, starting and playing forty minutes, in the club's 2–0 win over Martín Ledesma in the opening round of the Primera B. Salvador's side gained promotion into the Second Division of Paraguay where he will now compete on a regular basis. Cabañas was invited to partake in a half time memorial appearance for Chiapas in a Liga MX match against Pumas. He received a standing ovation from the crowd at halftime. Jaguares later went on to win the match 3–0.

=== First retirement and return to football ===
On 26 January 2014, Cabañas announced his retirement from football, after having received an offer from the Mexican second division side Murciélagos FC. However, on 1 February 2014, it was announced that Cabañas had signed with Club 12 de Octubre, who had been promoted to the Paraguayan Primera División for the 2014 season. On 16 February 2014, the day that Cabañas was meant to debut against Cerro Porteño in the Round 1 of the 2014 Paraguayan Primera División season, it was announced by club spokesman, Miguel Soloaga, that Cabañas would not participate in the competition due to his low form. Sologa stated that Cabañas was out of physical form and discarded from the Torneo Apertura but would continue to participate in the club's training sessions.

=== Tanabi Esporte Clube ===
On 17 March 2014, it was announced that Cabañas had signed a three-month contract with São Paulo Segunda Divisão (equivalent to the state fourth division) outfit Tanabi Esporte Clube. The club's president, Irineu Alves, travelled by car from Brazil to Paraguay in order to finalize the contract, stating that Cabañas was a big financial signing for the club. On 18 May 2014, Cabañas debuted for the club in a friendly against Gremio Barueri, which ended in a 2–2 draw, where Cabañas missed a penalty in the last minute.

=== Second retirement ===
On 30 May 2014, Cabañas officially announced that he had retired due to not being able to maintain a rhythm to play since being shot in the head in 2010.

=== Independiente Fútbol Club PJC ===
On 27 June 2014, Cabañas came out of retirement and signed with Independiente Fútbol Club of Pedro Juan Caballero. On 29 June 2014, Cabañas debuted for Independiente against former Primera División Paraguaya club Sportivo 2 de Mayo in the Liga Deportiva Amambay of the Paraguayan Cuarta División, entering the field in the 35th minute of the second half.

== International career ==
In 1997, Cabañas represented Paraguay's U17 team at the 1997 South American Under-17 Football Championship held in Paraguay, scoring 3 goals. Two years later, Cabañas was selected in Paraguay's U20 squad to participate at the 1999 South American U-20 Championship, where he scored two goals. Paraguay qualified for the 1999 FIFA World Youth Championship as Cabañas was selected in the squad which featured Roque Santa Cruz and Nelson Cuevas.

Cabañas debuted for the Paraguay national team during the 2006 World Cup qualification campaign. He was selected in the squad for the tournament finals but did not play.

He scored three goals in four matches in the 2007 Copa América as Paraguay reached the quarter-finals. He was the team's top scorer in the 2010 World Cup qualifiers with six goals, including one in a 2–0 win over Brazil in Asunción.

== Career statistics ==
=== International ===
Appearances and goals by national team and year
National team	Year	Apps	Goals
Paraguay	2003	3	0
Paraguay	2004	2	0
Paraguay	2005	7	1
Paraguay	2006	6	0
Paraguay	2007	12	4
Paraguay	2008	5	2
Paraguay	2009	9	3
Total		44	10

Scores and results list Paraguay's goal tally first, score column indicates score after each Cabañas goal.

List of international goals scored by Salvador Cabañas
No.	Date	Venue	Opponent	Score	Result	Competition
1	27 March 2005	Estadio Olímpico Atahualpa, Quito, Ecuador	Ecuador	2–0	2–5	2006 FIFA World Cup qualification
2	28 June 2007	Estadio José Pachencho Romero, Maracaibo, Venezuela	Colombia	4–0	5–0	2007 Copa América
3	28 June 2007	Estadio José Pachencho Romero, Maracaibo, Venezuela	Colombia	5–0	5–0	2007 Copa América
4	2 July 2007	Estadio Agustín Tovar, Barinas, Venezuela	United States	3–1	3–1	2007 Copa América
5	21 November 2007	Estadio Nacional de Chile, Santiago, Chile	Chile	1–0	3–0	2010 FIFA World Cup qualification
6	15 June 2008	Estadio Defensores del Chaco, Asunción, Paraguay	Brazil	2–0	2–0	2010 FIFA World Cup qualification
7	11 October 2008	Estadio El Campín, Bogotá, Colombia	Colombia	1–0	1–0	2010 FIFA World Cup qualification
8	10 June 2009	Estádio do Arruda, Recife, Brazil	Brazil	1–0	1–2	2010 FIFA World Cup qualification
9	5 September 2009	Estadio Defensores del Chaco, Asunción, Paraguay	Bolivia	1–0	1–0	2010 FIFA World Cup qualification
10	10 October 2009	Polideportivo Cachamay, Puerto Ordaz, Venezuela	Venezuela	1–0	2–1	2010 FIFA World Cup qualification

== Honours ==
América

- InterLiga: 2008

12 de Octubre

- Paraguayan Tercera División: 2012

Individual

- South American Footballer of the Year: 2007
- Paraguayan Footballer of the Year: 2007, 2008, 2009
- Copa Libertadores Top Scorer: 2007, 2008
- Liga MX Balón de Oro Best Forward: Clausura 2008
- Liga MX Golden Boot (Shared): Clausura 2006
- Primera División de Chile Top Scorer: 2003-A
- Tecate Premios Deportes Best Forward: 2009
- Tecate Premios Deportes Best XI: 2008, 2009
- InterLiga Top Scorer: 2010

== See also ==
- Players and Records in Paraguayan Football
