= Paraguayan Footballer of the Year =

Annual football award in Paraguay

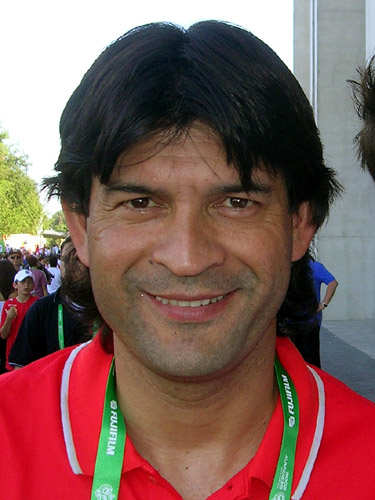
José Cardozo, pictured here in 2006, is a three-time winner of the journalists' award.

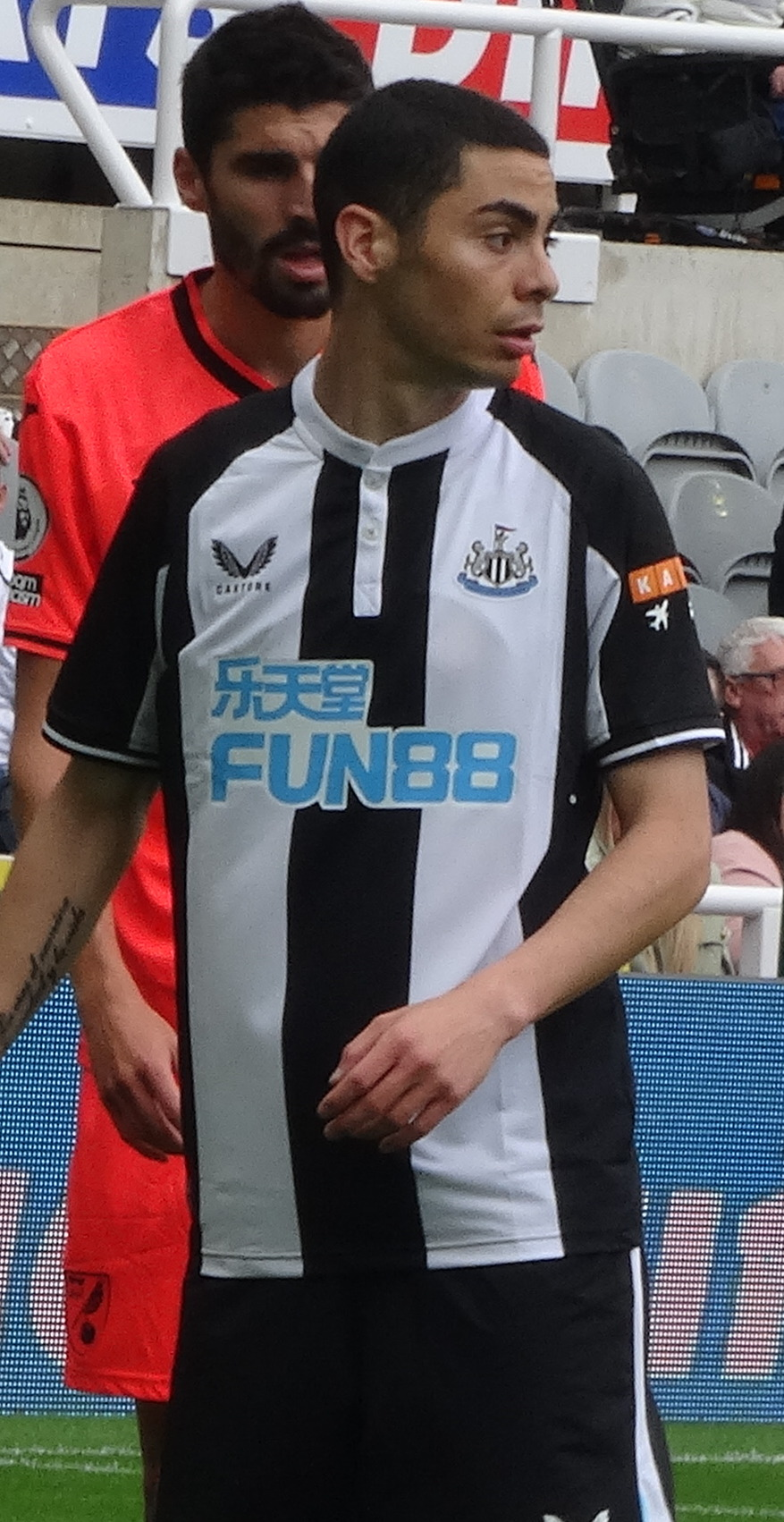
Miguel Almirón, also a three-time winner of the journalists' award.

The Paraguayan Footballer of the Year is an award given to the best Paraguayan professional football player every year. The award began officially in 1997 and it is presented by Paraguayan newspaper ABC Color. Players that participate in this award can play in any professional football club in the world (although they do not necessarily have to be Paraguayan football clubs) and have to be either Paraguayan-born or Paraguayan-naturalised players.

A second award, voted by the public, was established in 2004. Justo Villar was the inaugural winner.

== Winners ==
=== Journalists' vote ===
Year	Player	Club(s)	Ref.
1997	Carlos Gamarra	(Portugal) Benfica	
1998	Carlos Gamarra	(Brazil) Corinthians	
1999	Roque Santa Cruz	(Paraguay) Olimpia (Germany) Bayern Munich (Note: Santa Cruz played the first half of 1999 for Olimpia, before being transferred to Bayern Munich in August 1999.)	
2000	José Cardozo	(Mexico) Toluca	
2001	Roberto Acuña	(Spain) Zaragoza	
2002	José Cardozo	(Mexico) Toluca	
2003	José Cardozo	(Mexico) Toluca	
2004	Justo Villar	(Argentina) Newell's Old Boys	
2005	Julio dos Santos	(Paraguay) Cerro Porteño	
2006	Óscar Cardozo	(Paraguay) Nacional (Argentina) Newell's Old Boys (Note: Cardozo played the first half of 2006 for Nacional, before being transferred to Newell's Old Boys in the second half of 2006.)	
2007	Salvador Cabañas	(Mexico) América	
2008	Claudio Morel	(Argentina) Boca Juniors	
2009	Óscar Cardozo	(Portugal) Benfica	
2010	Lucas Barrios	(Germany) Borussia Dortmund	
2011	Pablo Zeballos	(Paraguay) Olimpia	
2012	Pablo Aguilar	(Paraguay) Sportivo Luqueño (Mexico) Tijuana (Note: Aguilar played the first half of 2012 on loan to Sportivo Luqueño, and the second half of 2012 on loan to Tijuana.)	
2013	Ángel Romero	(Paraguay) Cerro Porteño	
2014	Fernando Fernández	(Paraguay) Guaraní	
2015	Derlis González	(Ukraine) Dynamo Kyiv	
2016	Rodrigo Rojas	(Paraguay) Cerro Porteño	
2017	Miguel Almirón	(United States) Atlanta United	
2018	Miguel Almirón	(United States) Atlanta United	
2019	Roque Santa Cruz	(Paraguay) Olimpia	
2020	Not awarded		
2021	Gustavo Gómez	(Brazil) Palmeiras	
2022	Miguel Almirón	(England) Newcastle United	
2023	Mathías Villasanti	(Brazil) Grêmio	
2024	Diego Gómez	(United States) Inter Miami	
2025	Omar Alderete	(Spain) Getafe (England) Sunderland (Note: Alderete played the first half of 2025 for Getafe, before being transferred to Sunderland in August 2025.)	

=== Public vote ===
Year	Player	Club(s)	Ref.
2004	Justo Villar	(Argentina) Newell's Old Boys	
2005	Julio dos Santos	(Paraguay) Cerro Porteño	
2006	Óscar Cardozo	(Paraguay) Nacional (Argentina) Newell's Old Boys	
2007	Nelson Valdez	(Germany) Borussia Dortmund	
2008	Salvador Cabañas	(Mexico) América	
2009	Salvador Cabañas	(Mexico) América	
2010	Nelson Valdez	(Spain) Hércules	
2011	Pablo Zeballos	(Paraguay) Olimpia	
2012	Fidencio Oviedo	(Paraguay) Cerro Porteño	
2013	Pablo Aguilar	(Mexico) Tijuana	
2014	Fernando Fernández	(Paraguay) Guaraní	
2015	Rodrigo Rojas	(Paraguay) Cerro Porteño	
2016	William Mendieta	(Brazil) Palmeiras	
2017	Miguel Almirón	(United States) Atlanta United	
2018	Roque Santa Cruz	(Paraguay) Olimpia	
2019	Roque Santa Cruz	(Paraguay) Olimpia	
2020	Not awarded		
2021	Gustavo Gómez	(Brazil) Palmeiras	
2022	Miguel Almirón	(England) Newcastle United	
2023	Mathías Villasanti	(Brazil) Grêmio	
2024	Diego Gómez	(United States) Inter Miami	
2025	Blas Riveros	(Argentina) Talleres (Paraguay) Cerro Porteño (Note: Riveros played the first half of 2025 for Talleres, before being transferred to Cerro Porteño in August 2025.)	
