= Édgar Barreto =

Paraguayan footballer (born 1984)

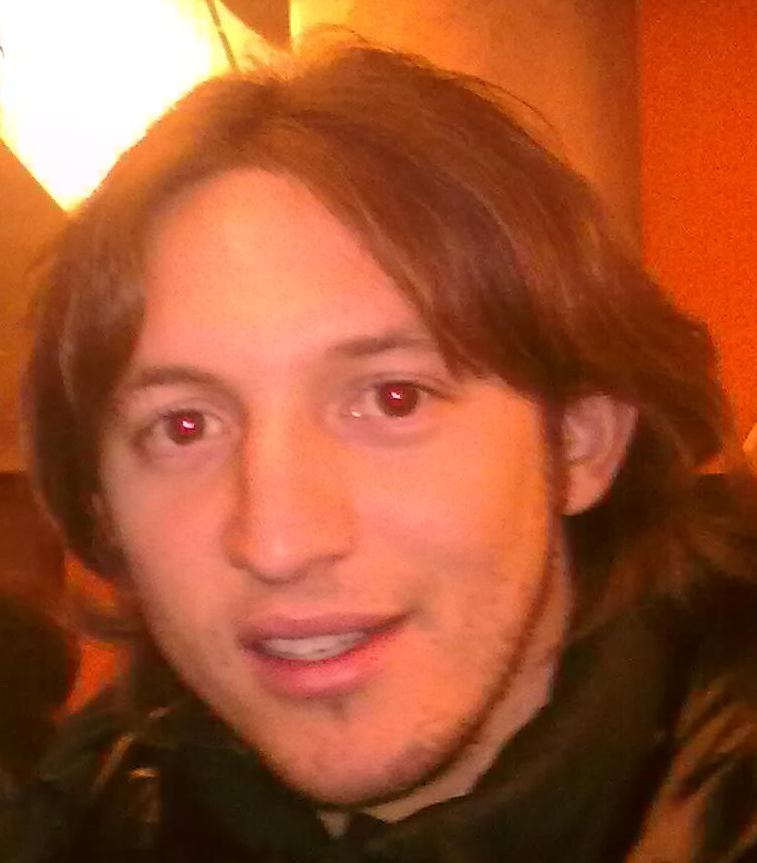

Personal information
- Full name: Édgar Osvaldo Barreto Cáceres
- Date of birth: 15 July 1984 (age 42)
- Place of birth: Asunción, Paraguay
- Height: 1.80 m (5 ft 11 in)
- Position: Central midfielder

Youth career
- Cerro Porteño

Senior career*
Years	Team	Apps	(Gls)
2002–2003	Cerro Porteño	26	(4)
2004–2007	NEC	95	(10)
2007–2009	Reggina	68	(5)
2009–2011	Atalanta	33	(1)
2011–2015	Palermo	122	(7)
2015–2020	Sampdoria	104	(3)
2020–2022	NEC	47	(4)
Total		495	(34)

International career
2001	Paraguay U17	3	(0)
2003	Paraguay U20	4	(0)
2004	Paraguay U23	7	(0)
2004–2011	Paraguay	60	(3)
Medal record
Representing Paraguay
Men's Football
Silver medal – second place	2004 Athens	Team competition
Copa América
Silver medal – second place	2011 Argentina	Team
- * Club domestic league appearances and goals

Édgar Osvaldo Barreto Cáceres (born 15 July 1984) is a Paraguayan former professional footballer who played as a central midfielder. He played for the national U17, U20 and U23 teams before going on to make 60 appearances for Paraguay's senior squad.

After starting his career with Cerro Porteño in his homeland and NEC in the Dutch Eredivisie, Barreto spent the vast majority of his career in Italy's Serie A. He made over 260 appearances in the competition, in service of Reggina, Atalanta, Palermo and Sampdoria, and retiring in 2022 after two seasons back in the Netherlands at NEC.

Barreto earned 60 caps for the Paraguay national team from 2004 to 2011. After winning a silver medal at the 2004 Olympics, he played for the country at three Copa América tournaments and two FIFA World Cups, finishing as runner-up in the 2011 Copa América.

== Club career ==
Barreto started his career with Paraguayan club Cerro Porteño, debuting in the 2002 season. The following year he made his debut in the Copa Libertadores.

in January 2004, he signed with Eredivisie club NEC Nijmegen.

In the summer of 2007, Barreto agreed to a four-year contract with Reggina Calcio. He played an integral part in keeping Reggina in Serie A at the end of the 2007–08 season, earning a reputation for scoring long range goals. In summer 2009, after Reggina moved to Serie B, he was sold to Atalanta Bergamo.

At Atalanta, Barreto missed most of his first season through injury, only returning in the last days of the season and not being able to avoid the relegation of his club in Serie B. His excellent performances in Serie B afforded the interest Napoli during the January market. He contributed to the promotion of the Bergamaschi to Serie A in the 2010–11 season, at the end of which he was voted into "Top 11 Serie B" players team by Italian journalists.

On 31 August 2011, Barreto moved to Palermo on a four-year contract while a transfer fee of €5.3 million was paid to Atalanta.

On 1 July 2015, Barreto signed a contract with U.C. Sampdoria.

During an interview in July 2017, Barreto affirmed that he would not return to Paraguayan football due to family reasons, although he recognized that his time at Cerro Porteño was fundamental for his career.

In May 2020 he agreed the termination of his contract with Sampdoria.

=== Return to NEC ===
Upon Barreto's contract termination with Sampadoria, NEC's fans had dreamed and expressed his return. Barreto actually owned a house and three apartments that he leased in the city of Nijmegen, which was also a destination venue for his family during vacations and, on more than one occasion, Barreto manifested his wish to return to the club. NEC's fans had placed a banner at the entry of the club's stadium asking Barreto to return as NEC's general manager, Wilco van Schaik, lifted the fan's hopes of Barreto returning to the club. Van Schaik had told Dutch magazine Voetbal International that Barreto was an important player in NEC and still held a lot of weight in the city, with the club expressing interest in the player since the month of May. On 15 July 2020, on his 36th birthday and after 13 years in Italian football, Barreto returned to his first European club NEC in the Dutch second tier. Barreto signed a season-long contract with the option of extending for another season. In August 2020, Barreto played his first match of the season in a 2–0 defeat to Cambuur. On 15 May 2022, he announced his retirement from football, while stating his desire to start a managerial career.

== International career ==
Barreto debuted for the Paraguay national football team in a 1–0 win over Costa Rica on 8 June at the 2004 Copa América. He played all four games as his team reached the quarter-finals. Weeks later, he was part of their squad that took home a silver medal at the 2004 Olympics in Greece. On 4 August, before the Summer Olympics began, he played in a preparation game against the Portugal of Cristiano Ronaldo in the city of Algarve, resulting in a 5–0 defeat.

On 17 August 2005, Barreto scored his first international goal to open a 3–0 friendly win over El Salvador in Ciudad del Este. Coach Anibal Ruiz called him up for the 2006 FIFA World Cup in Germany.

At the 2007 Copa América in Venezuela, Barreto again played all four matches of a quarter-final finish. He scored to open a 3–1 win over the United States in the group stage. At the 2010 FIFA World Cup in South Africa, he came on in the 75th minute against Japan in the last 16 and scored the first attempt in the penalty shootout, as Paraguay advanced to the next round for the first time.

Barreto was also in Gerardo Martino's squad that came runners-up to the hosts at the 2011 Copa América in Uruguay. Again on as a substitute in the quarter-finals against holders Brazil, he took the first penalty after another goalless draw, sending it wide in an eventual triumph.

On 5 August 2012, Barreto announced his international retirement for the Albirroja. He said that he could no longer combine the long journeys with competing in Serie A.

== Personal life ==
Barreto is the younger brother of goalkeeper Diego Barreto, who was his international teammate.

== Career statistics ==
=== Club ===
Appearances and goals by club, season and competition
Club	Season	League			Cup		Europe		Other		Total	
Club	Season	Division	Apps	Goals	Apps	Goals	Apps	Goals	Apps	Goals	Apps	Goals
NEC	2003–04	Eredivisie	9	0	0	0	–		–		9	0
NEC	2004–05	Eredivisie	25	5	0	0	–		–		25	5
NEC	2005–06	Eredivisie	32	3	0	0	–		2 (Note: Appearances in Eredivisie play-offs for UI-Cup)	0	34	3
NEC	2006–07	Eredivisie	29	2	0	0	–		4	0	33	2
NEC	Total		95	10	0	0	0	0	6	0	101	10
Reggina	2007–08	Serie A	36	3	2	1	–		–		38	4
Reggina	2008–09	Serie A	32	2	1	0	–		–		33	2
Reggina	Total		68	5	3	1	0	0	0	0	71	6
Atalanta	2009–10	Serie A	4	0	1	0	–		–		5	0
Atalanta	2010–11	Serie B	29	1	0	0	–		–		29	1
Atalanta	Total		33	1	1	0	0	0	0	0	34	1
Palermo	2011–12	Serie A	34	1	0	0	–		–		34	1
Palermo	2012–13	Serie A	30	0	2	0	–		–		32	0
Palermo	2013–14	Serie B	34	4	0	0	–		–		34	4
Palermo	2014–15	Serie A	24	2	1	0	–		–		25	2
Palermo	Total		122	7	3	0	0	0	0	0	125	7
Sampdoria	2015–16	Serie A	30	0	0	0	2	0	–		32	0
Sampdoria	2016–17	Serie A	32	2	1	0	–		–		33	2
Sampdoria	2017–18	Serie A	28	1	2	2	–		–		30	3
Sampdoria	2018–19	Serie A	12	0	1	0	–		–		13	0
Sampdoria	2019–20	Serie A	2	0	0	0	–		–		2	0
Sampdoria	Total		104	3	4	2	2	0	0	0	110	5
NEC	2020–21	Eerste Divisie	28	3	2	0	–		3 (Note: Appearances in Eerste Divisie play-offs for promotion)	0	33	3
NEC	2021–22	Eredivisie	19	1	1	0	–		–		20	1
NEC	Total		47	4	3	0	0	0	3	0	53	4
Career total			469	30	14	3	4	0	9	0	496	33

=== International ===
Appearances and goals by national team and year
National team	Year	Apps	Goals
Paraguay	2004	6	0
Paraguay	2005	6	1
Paraguay	2006	6	0
Paraguay	2007	14	1
Paraguay	2008	10	0
Paraguay	2009	5	0
Paraguay	2010	5	1
Paraguay	2011	8	0
Total		60	3

Scores and results list Paraguay's goal tally first, score column indicates score after each Barreto goal.

List of international goals scored by Édgar Barreto
No.	Date	Venue	Opponent	Score	Result	Competition
1	17 August 2005	Antonio Aranda Stadium, Ciudad del Este, Paraguay	El Salvador	1–0	3–0	Friendly
2	2 July 2007	Estadio Agustín Tovar, Barinas, Venezuela	United States	1–0	3–1	2007 Copa América
3	17 November 2010	Hong Kong Stadium, So Kon Po, Hong Kong	Hong Kong	2–0	7–0	Friendly

== Honours ==
Paraguay U23

- Silver Medal at the Summer Olympics: 2004 Athens
