= José María Rodríguez (football manager) =

Uruguayan football player and manager

Personal information
- Full name: José María Rodríguez
- Date of birth: 1926
- Place of birth: Montevideo, Uruguay
- Date of death: 15 November 2003 (aged 77)
- Place of death: Montevideo, Uruguay
- Position: Defender

Senior career*
Years	Team	Apps	(Gls)
1952–1954	La Piedad		
1954–1955	Irapuato		
1955–1956	Montecarlo		

Managerial career
- 1957: Morelia
- 1959–1962: Irapuato
- 1963: Liverpool Montevideo
- 1964–1965: Barcelona SC
- 1965: Ecuador
- 1965–1966: Colo-Colo
- 1966: Racing Montevideo
- 1967–1971: Guaraní
- 1969: Paraguay
- 1971–1973: Olimpia
- 1974: Peñarol
- 1974–1975: Paraguay
- 1976: Uruguay
- 1977: Barcelona SC
- 1978: Sud América
- 1980: Deportes Tolima
- 1980–1981: Sud América
- 1981: Paraguay
- 1983: Libertad
- 1984: Bella Vista
- 1989: Guaraní
- * Club domestic league appearances and goals

José María Rodríguez (1926 – 15 November 2003), also known as Chema Rodríguez, was a Uruguayan football back and manager.

== Career ==
Born in Montevideo, Uruguay, Rodríguez played in Mexico for La Piedad, Irapuato and Montecarlo. As a football manager, Rodríguez developed the most part of his career abroad. He started his career in Mexico with Morelia and Irapuato, winning the 1959 Copa de Oro de Occidente.

In Ecuador, Rodríguez led Barcelona SC in 1964–65 and 1977, winning the 1965 Campeonato de Fútbol del Guayas. In Chile, he coached Colo-Colo in 1965–66.

In Paraguay, Rodríguez led Guaraní, winning the Paraguayan Primera División in 1967 and 1969, Olimpia, winning the league title in 1971, and Libertad. In his homeland, he led giant Peñarol in 1974 and also led Liverpool, Racing Club de Montevideo, Sud América and Bella Vista.

Rodríguez also had a stint in Colombia with Deportes Tolima.

Rodríguez also managed the national teams of Ecuador (1965), Paraguay (1969, 1974–75, 1981) and Uruguay (1976).
