= Carlos Bonet =

Paraguayan footballer (born 1977)

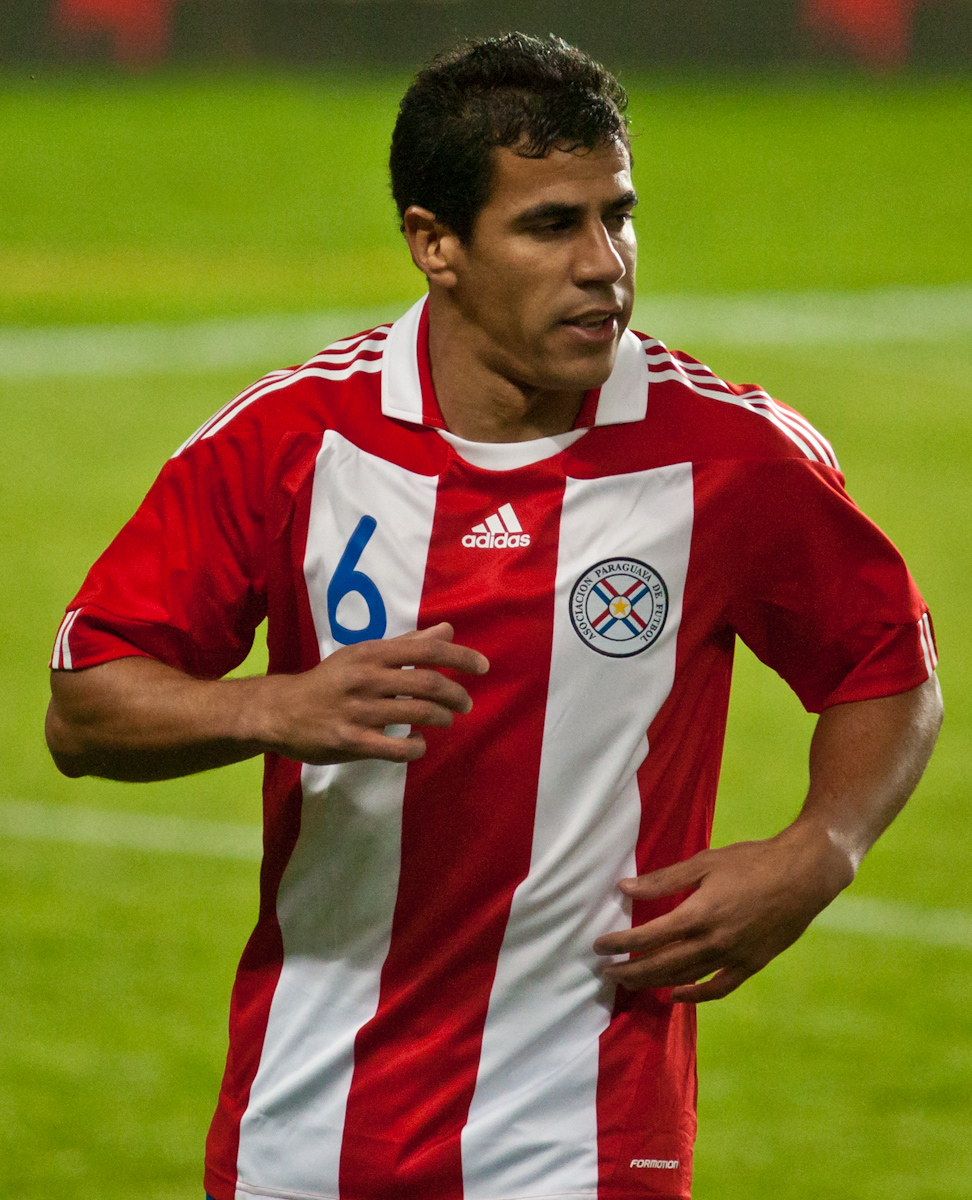
- Bonet with Paraguay in 2010

Personal information
- Full name: Carlos Bonet Cáceres
- Date of birth: 2 October 1977 (age 49)
- Place of birth: Asunción, Paraguay
- Height: 1.75 m (5 ft 9 in)
- Position: Right back

Team information
- Current team: Nacional Asunción (sporting director)

Senior career*
Years	Team	Apps	(Gls)
1997–1998	Sol de América		
1998–2002	Atlético Rafaela	124	(8)
2002–2007	Libertad	124	(9)
2007–2009	Cruz Azul	83	(2)
2009–2010	Olimpia	19	(1)
2010–2012	Libertad	56	(0)
2012–2017	Cerro Porteño	140	(0)
2017	Deportivo Capiatá	19	(0)
2017–2018	Nacional Asunción	33	(0)
2018	Deportivo Capiatá	11	(0)

International career
2002–2013	Paraguay	80	(1)

Managerial career
- 2022: Nacional Asunción
- * Club domestic league appearances and goals

Carlos Bonet Cáceres (born 2 October 1977) is a Paraguayan football manager and former player who played as a right back. He is the current sporting director of Nacional Asunción.

Bonet was chosen to represent his country in the 2002, 2006 and 2010 FIFA World Cups. He retired in 2018, and after working for a couple of years as a sporting director, he switched to managerial roles in 2022.

== Honours ==
Libertad

- Paraguayan Primera División: 2002, 2003, 2006
