= Paraguay national football team results (1980–1999) =

This page details the match results and statistics of the Paraguay national football team from 1980 to 1999.

== Key ==
Key to matches

- Att.=Match attendance
- (H)=Home ground
- (A)=Away ground
- (N)=Neutral ground

Key to record by opponent

- Pld=Games played
- W=Games won
- D=Games drawn
- L=Games lost
- GF=Goals for
- GA=Goals against

== Results ==
Paraguay's score is shown first in each case.

Paraguay national football team results
No.	Date	Venue	Opponents	Score	Competition	Paraguay scorers	Att.	Ref.
299	26 August 1980	Estadio Hernando Siles, La Paz (A)	Bolivia	1–1	Copa Paz del Chaco	Isasi	—	
300	28 August 1980	Estadio William Bendeck, Santa Cruz de la Sierra (A)	Bolivia	3–1	Friendly	Isasi, Florentín, Michelagnoli	—	
301	18 September 1980	Asunción (H)	Bolivia	2–1	Copa Paz del Chaco	López, Miño	—	
302	25 September 1980	Estadio Defensores del Chaco, Asunción (H)	Brazil	1–2	Friendly	G. Benítez	25,000	
303	30 October 1980	Estádio Serra Dourada, Goiânia (A)	Brazil	0–6	Friendly		59,050	
304	15 March 1981	Estadio Defensores del Chaco, Asunción (H)	Colombia	0–2	Friendly		18,000	
305	17 May 1981	Estadio Modelo, Guayaquil (A)	Ecuador	0–1	1982 FIFA World Cup qualification		55,000	
306	31 May 1981	Estadio Defensores del Chaco, Asunción (H)	Ecuador	3–1	1982 FIFA World Cup qualification	Michelagnoli, E. Morel, Romerito	37,000	
307	7 June 1981	Estadio Defensores del Chaco, Asunción (H)	Chile	0–1	1982 FIFA World Cup qualification		46,178	
308	21 June 1981	Estadio Nacional, Santiago (A)	Chile	0–3	1982 FIFA World Cup qualification		80,000	
309	2 June 1983	Asunción (H)	Uruguay	0–0	Copa Artigas		—	
310	9 June 1983	Estadio Centenario, Montevideo (A)	Uruguay	0–3	Copa Artigas		—	
311	14 July 1983	Estadio Defensores del Chaco, Asunción (H)	Argentina	1–0	Copa Félix Bogado	Delgado	27,000	
312	21 July 1983	Buenos Aires (A)	Argentina	0–0	Copa Félix Bogado		30,000	
313	24 July 1983	Asunción (H)	Chile	1–0	Friendly	Hicks	—	
314	3 August 1983	Estadio Hernando Siles, La Paz (A)	Bolivia	1–2	Friendly	Florentín	—	
315	5 August 1983	Estadio Hernando Siles, La Paz (A)	Bolivia	3–1	Friendly	Delgado, Florentín (2)	—	
316	17 August 1983	Antofagasta (A)	Chile	2–3	Friendly	Delgado, Olmedo	25,000	
317	25 August 1983	Estadio Centenario, Montevideo (A)	Uruguay	0–0	Friendly		20,000	
318	5 October 1983	Lima (A)	Peru	2–0	Friendly	Romerito, Torales	—	
319	7 October 1983	Asunción (H)	Peru	4–1	Friendly	Cabañas (2), Romerito (2)	—	
320	13 October 1983	Estadio Defensores del Chaco, Asunción (H)	Brazil	1–1	1983 Copa América	M. Morel	55,000	
321	20 October 1983	Estádio Parque do Sabiá, Uberlândia (A)	Brazil	0–0 (a.e.t.)	1983 Copa América		75,000	
322	3 February 1985	Estadio Centenario, Montevideo (A)	Uruguay	0–1	Copa Artigas		65,000	
323	6 February 1985	Viña del Mar (A)	Chile	0–1	Friendly		21,000	
324	10 February 1985	Asunción (H)	Uruguay	1–3	Copa Artigas	R. Benitez	—	
325	28 February 1985	Estadio Defensores del Chaco, Asunción (H)	Colombia	0–3	Friendly		—	
326	17 April 1985	Estadio Hernán Ramírez Villegas, Pereira (A)	Colombia	0–1	Friendly		26,000	
327	19 April 1985	Estadio El Campín, Bogotá (A)	Colombia	2–2	Friendly	Mendoza, B. Ferreira	—	
328	28 April 1985	Asunción (H)	Argentina	1–0	Friendly	Mendoza	25,000	
329	9 May 1985	Buenos Aires (A)	Argentina	1–1	Friendly	Zabala	—	
330	26 May 1985	Estadio Ramón Tahuichi Aguilera, Santa Cruz de la Sierra (A)	Bolivia	1–1	1986 FIFA World Cup qualification	Nunes	20,000	
331	9 June 1985	Estadio Defensores del Chaco, Asunción (H)	Bolivia	3–0	1986 FIFA World Cup qualification	Mendoza, Jacquet, Romerito	40,000	
332	16 June 1985	Estadio Defensores del Chaco, Asunción (H)	Brazil	0–2	1986 FIFA World Cup qualification		55,000	
333	23 June 1985	Maracanã Stadium, Rio de Janeiro (A)	Brazil	1–1	1986 FIFA World Cup qualification	Romerito	139,923	
334	9 October 1985	Asunción (H)	Chile	0–0	Friendly		—	
335	16 October 1985	Lima (A)	Peru	1–0	Friendly	B. Ferreira	—	
336	19 October 1985	Santiago (A)	Chile	0–0	Friendly		—	
337	27 October 1985	Estadio Defensores del Chaco, Asunción (H)	Colombia	3–0	1986 FIFA World Cup qualification	Hicks, Romerito, Cabañas	40,000	
338	3 November 1985	Estadio Olímpico Pascual Guerrero, Cali (A)	Colombia	1–2	1986 FIFA World Cup qualification	B. Ferreira	10,000	
339	10 November 1985	Estadio Defensores del Chaco, Asunción (H)	Chile	3–0	1986 FIFA World Cup qualification	Cabañas (2), Delgado	60,000	
340	17 November 1985	Estadio Nacional, Santiago (A)	Chile	2–2	1986 FIFA World Cup qualification	Romerito, Schettina	62,000	
341	29 January 1986	BC Place, Vancouver (A)	Canada	0–0	Friendly		18,003	
342	5 February 1986	Miami Orange Bowl, Miami (N)	Jamaica	4–1	Miami Cup	Hicks (2), Alcaraz (2)	—	
343	16 February 1986	Hong Kong (N)	South Korea	3–1	Lunar New Year Cup	Kim Pyung-seok (o.g.), Sandoval, Schettina	10,000	
344	21 February 1986	Gelora Senayan Stadium, Jakarta (A)	Indonesia	3–2	Friendly	Hicks, Zabala, Cañete	14,000	
345	26 February 1986	Doha (A)	Qatar	1–1	Friendly	Delgado	3,000	
346	1 March 1986	Doha (A)	Qatar	3–0	Friendly	B. Ferreira, Samaniego, Zabala	—	
347	8 March 1986	Manama (A)	Bahrain	2–1	Friendly	Hicks, Samaniego	4,000	
348	12 March 1986	Prince Saud bin Jalawi Sports City Stadium, Khobar (A)	Saudi Arabia	0–0	Friendly		—	
349	20 May 1986	Bogotá (N)	Denmark	2–1	Friendly	Cabañas (2)	—	
350	4 June 1986	Estadio Toluca 70–86, Toluca (N)	Iraq	1–0	1986 FIFA World Cup	Romerito	24,000	
351	7 June 1986	Estadio Azteca, Mexico City (N)	Mexico	1–1	1986 FIFA World Cup	Romerito	114,000	
352	11 June 1986	Estadio Toluca 70–86, Toluca (N)	Belgium	2–2	1986 FIFA World Cup	Cabañas (2)	16,000	
353	18 June 1986	Estadio Azteca, Mexico City (N)	England	0–3	1986 FIFA World Cup		99,000	
354	14 June 1987	Santa Cruz de la Sierra (A)	Bolivia	2–0	Friendly	Palacios, Jacquet	—	
355	20 June 1987	Buenos Aires (A)	Argentina	1–0	Friendly	Garré (o.g.)	10,000	
356	24 June 1987	Estádio Olímpico Monumental, Porto Alegre (A)	Brazil	0–1	Friendly		21,964	
357	28 June 1987	Estadio Gigante de Arroyito, Rosario (N)	Bolivia	0–0	1987 Copa América		5,000	
358	5 July 1987	Estadio Gigante de Arroyito, Rosario (N)	Colombia	0–3	1987 Copa América		10,000	
359	7 September 1988	Estadio Monumental, Guayaquil (A)	Ecuador	5–1	Friendly	F. Román (2), Almiron, Rivarola, B. Ferreira	30,000	
360	12 September 1988	Tegucigalpa (A)	Honduras	0–0	Friendly		—	
361	15 September 1988	Tegucigalpa (A)	Honduras	2–0	Friendly	F. Román, Escobar	—	
362	17 September 1988	San Salvador (A)	El Salvador	1–0	Friendly	G. Román	—	
363	21 September 1988	Lima (A)	Peru	1–0	Friendly	F. Román	—	
364	27 September 1988	Asunción (H)	Chile	2–0	Copa Boquerón	G. Román, Perez (o.g.)	10,000	
365	29 September 1988	Asunción (H)	Uruguay	3–1	Copa Boquerón	Palacios, J. Franco, Jacquet	15,000	
366	12 October 1988	Estadio Centenario, Montevideo (A)	Uruguay	0–2	Friendly		15,000	
367	12 March 1989	Kingston (A)	Jamaica	3–0	Friendly	Jacquet, Palacios, G. Román	—	
368	19 March 1989	Port of Spain (A)	Trinidad and Tobago	2–2	Friendly	Cáceres, B. Ferreira	4,000	
369	22 March 1989	Port of Spain (A)	Trinidad and Tobago	1–1	Friendly	J. Franco	7,000	
370	26 March 1989	Caracas (A)	Venezuela	2–1	Friendly	B. Ferreira, J. Franco	12,000	
371	30 March 1989	Maturín (A)	Venezuela	0–0	Friendly		6,500	
372	12 April 1989	Albertão, Teresina (A)	Brazil	0–2	Friendly		59,884	
373	5 May 1989	Los Angeles Memorial Coliseum, Los Angeles (N)	El Salvador	2–1	Four Nations Tournament	Palacios, J. Franco	20,000	
374	7 May 1989	Los Angeles Memorial Coliseum, Los Angeles (N)	Guatemala	2–1	Four Nations Tournament	J. Ferreira, F. Román	6,000	
375	15 May 1989	Asunción (H)	Peru	1–1	Friendly	F. Román	20,000	
376	25 May 1989	Estadio Félix Capriles, Cochabamba (N)	Bolivia	2–3	Friendly	Rojas, J. Franco	30,000	
377	1 June 1989	Asunción (H)	Bolivia	2–0	Friendly	B. Ferreira (2)	8,000	
378	1 July 1989	Estádio Fonte Nova, Salvador (N)	Peru	5–2	1989 Copa América	Cañete (2), Neffa, Mendoza, Del Solar (o.g.)	5,000	
379	5 July 1989	Estádio Fonte Nova, Salvador (N)	Colombia	1–0	1989 Copa América	Mendoza	1,500	
380	7 July 1989	Estádio Fonte Nova, Salvador (N)	Venezuela	3–0	1989 Copa América	Neffa, B. Ferreira (2)	3,000	
381	9 July 1989	Estádio do Arruda Recife (N)	Brazil	0–2	1989 Copa América		76,800	
382	12 July 1989	Maracanã Stadium, Rio de Janeiro (N)	Uruguay	0–3	1989 Copa América		60,000	
383	14 July 1989	Maracanã Stadium, Rio de Janeiro (N)	Brazil	0–3	1989 Copa América		64,500	
384	16 July 1989	Maracanã Stadium, Rio de Janeiro (N)	Argentina	0–0	1989 Copa América		90,000	
385	27 August 1989	Estadio Defensores del Chaco, Asunción (H)	Colombia	2–1	1990 FIFA World Cup qualification	J. Ferreira, Chilavert	50,000	
386	10 September 1989	Estadio Defensores del Chaco, Asunción (H)	Ecuador	2–1	1990 FIFA World Cup qualification	Cabañas, J. Ferreira	60,000	
387	17 September 1989	Estadio Metropolitano, Barranquilla (A)	Colombia	1–2	1990 FIFA World Cup qualification	Mendoza	60,000	
388	24 September 1989	Estadio Monumental, Guayaquil (A)	Ecuador	1–3	1990 FIFA World Cup qualification	Neffa	18,000	
389	27 February 1991	Estádio Pedro Pedrossian, Campo Grande (A)	Brazil	1–1	Friendly	Samaniego	32,500	
390	14 June 1991	Estadio Ramón Tahuichi Aguilera, Santa Cruz de la Sierra (A)	Bolivia	1–0	Copa Paz del Chaco	G. González	8,000	
391	16 June 1991	Estadio Defensores del Chaco, Asunción (H)	Bolivia	0–0	Copa Paz del Chaco		5,000	
392	6 July 1991	Estadio Nacional, Santiago (N)	Peru	1–0	1991 Copa América	Monzón	45,000	
393	10 July 1991	Estadio Nacional, Santiago (N)	Venezuela	5–0	1991 Copa América	Neffa, Guirland, Monzón (2), Sanabria	30,000	
394	12 July 1991	Estadio Regional, Concepción (N)	Argentina	1–4	1991 Copa América	Cardozo	40,000	
395	14 July 1991	Estadio Nacional, Santiago (N)	Chile	0–4	1991 Copa América		80,000	
396	3 March 1993	Estadio Defensores del Chaco, Asunción (H)	Bolivia	1–0	Copa Paz del Chaco	N. Franco	25,000	
397	27 May 1993	Estadio Félix Capriles, Cochabamba (A)	Bolivia	1–2 (3–5p)	Copa Paz del Chaco	V. Ferreira	—	
398	10 June 1993	Estadio Azteca, Mexico City (A)	Mexico	1–3	Friendly	Struway	50,000	
399	18 June 1993	Estadio Alejandro Serrano Aguilar, Cuenca (N)	Chile	1–0	1993 Copa América	Cabañas	20,000	
400	21 June 1993	Estadio Alejandro Serrano Aguilar, Cuenca (N)	Peru	1–1	1993 Copa América	Monzón	20,000	
401	24 June 1993	Estadio Alejandro Serrano Aguilar, Cuenca (N)	Brazil	0–3	1993 Copa América		20,000	
402	26 June 1993	Estadio Olímpico Atahualpa, Quito (N)	Ecuador	0–3	1993 Copa América		45,000	
403	14 July 1993	Estádio São Januário, Rio de Janeiro (A)	Brazil	0–2	Friendly		40,000	
404	1 August 1993	Estadio Metropolitano, Barranquilla (A)	Colombia	0–0	1994 FIFA World Cup qualification		70,000	
405	8 August 1993	Estadio Defensores del Chaco, Asunción (H)	Argentina	1–3	1994 FIFA World Cup qualification	Struway	46,500	
406	15 August 1993	Estadio Defensores del Chaco, Asunción (H)	Peru	2–1	1994 FIFA World Cup qualification	Mendoza, Chilavert	30,500	
407	22 August 1993	Estadio Defensores del Chaco, Asunción (H)	Colombia	1–1	1994 FIFA World Cup qualification	Rivarola	30,000	
408	29 August 1993	Estadio Monumental, Buenos Aires (A)	Argentina	0–0	1994 FIFA World Cup qualification		47,000	
409	5 September 1993	Estadio Nacional, Lima (A)	Peru	2–2	1994 FIFA World Cup qualification	Mendoza (2)	40,000	
410	14 May 1995	Estadio Félix Capriles, Cochabamba (A)	Bolivia	1–1	Copa Paz del Chaco	Esteche	35,000	
411	9 June 1995	Estadio Manuel Ferreira, Asunción (H)	Bolivia	0–0 (4–3p)	Copa Paz del Chaco		7,000	
412	14 June 1995	Rosario (A)	Argentina	1–2	Friendly	Báez	20,000	
413	17 June 1995	Iquique (N)	Turkey	0–0	Copa Centenario		12,000	
414	19 June 1995	Estadio La Portada, La Serena (N)	Chile	1–0	Copa Centenario	Enciso	14,799	
415	22 June 1995	Estadio Nacional, Santiago (N)	New Zealand	3–2	Copa Centenario	Cardozo, Campos (2)	10,000	
416	30 June 1995	Estadio Defensores del Chaco, Asunción (H)	Ecuador	1–0	Friendly	Acuña	—	
417	6 July 1995	Estadio Campus Municipal, Maldonado (N)	Mexico	2–1	1995 Copa América	Cardozo, Samaniego	5,000	
418	9 July 1995	Estadio Centenario, Montevideo (N)	Uruguay	0–1	1995 Copa América		40,000	
419	12 July 1995	Estadio Campus Municipal, Maldonado (N)	Venezuela	3–2	1995 Copa América	Cardozo, Villamayor, Gamarra	2,000	
420	16 July 1995	Estadio Centenario, Montevideo (N)	Colombia	1–1 (4–5p)	1995 Copa América	Villamayor	25,000	
421	20 September 1995	Yoyogi National Stadium, Tokyo (A)	Japan	2–1	Friendly	Isasi, V. Ferreira	22,544	
422	14 February 1996	Estadio Olímpico Patria, Sucre (A)	Bolivia	1–4	Friendly	Villamayor	8,000	
423	24 April 1996	Estadio Metropolitano, Barranquilla (A)	Colombia	0–1	1998 FIFA World Cup qualification		31,600	
424	2 June 1996	Estadio Centenario, Montevideo (A)	Uruguay	2–0	1998 FIFA World Cup qualification	Arce, Rojas	44,127	
425	25 June 1996	Estadio Osvaldo Domínguez Dibb, Asunción (H)	Armenia	1–2	Friendly	Esteche	2,000	
426	26 July 1996	Estadio General Pablo Rojas, Asunción (H)	Bolivia	2–0	Friendly	Ayala, Cardozo	8,000	
427	8 August 1996	Olympic Stadium, Beijing (A)	China	2–0	Friendly	Bourdier, Espínola	50,000	
428	1 September 1996	Estadio Monumental, Buenos Aires (A)	Argentina	1–1	1998 FIFA World Cup qualification	Chilavert	65,500	
429	9 October 1996	Estadio Defensores del Chaco, Asunción (H)	Chile	2–1	1998 FIFA World Cup qualification	Gamarra, Rivarola	45,000	
430	10 November 1996	Estadio Defensores del Chaco, Asunción (H)	Ecuador	1–0	1998 FIFA World Cup qualification	Benítez	31,002	
431	15 December 1996	Estadio Hernando Siles, La Paz (A)	Bolivia	0–0	1998 FIFA World Cup qualification		45,000	
432	12 January 1997	Estadio Guillermo Soto Rosa, Mérida (A)	Venezuela	2–0	1998 FIFA World Cup qualification	Benítez, Enciso	7,981	
433	12 February 1997	Estadio Defensores del Chaco, Asunción (H)	Peru	2–1	1998 FIFA World Cup qualification	Rivarola, Rojas	32,000	
434	2 April 1997	Estadio Defensores del Chaco, Asunción (H)	Colombia	2–1	1998 FIFA World Cup qualification	Gamarra, Soto	37,297	
435	30 April 1997	Estadio Defensores del Chaco, Asunción (H)	Uruguay	3–1	1998 FIFA World Cup qualification	Rojas, Cardozo, Soto	34,101	
436	4 June 1997	Anheuser-Busch Center, Fenton (A)	United States	0–0	Friendly		7,000	
437	11 June 1997	Estadio Félix Capriles, Cochabamba (N)	Chile	1–0	1997 Copa América	Acuña	17,000	
438	14 June 1997	Estadio Félix Capriles, Cochabamba (N)	Ecuador	0–2	1997 Copa América		5,000	
439	17 June 1997	Estadio Félix Capriles, Cochabamba (N)	Argentina	1–1	1997 Copa América	Chilavert	8,000	
440	22 June 1997	Estadio Ramón Tahuichi Aguilera, Santa Cruz de la Sierra (N)	Brazil	0–2	1997 Copa América		30,000	
441	6 July 1997	Estadio Defensores del Chaco, Asunción (H)	Argentina	1–2	1998 FIFA World Cup qualification	Acuña	30,000	
442	20 July 1997	Estadio Nacional, Santiago (A)	Chile	1–2	1998 FIFA World Cup qualification	Brizuela	75,143	
443	20 August 1997	Estadio Olímpico Atahualpa, Quito (A)	Ecuador	1–2	1998 FIFA World Cup qualification	Báez	12,000	
444	10 September 1997	Estadio Defensores del Chaco, Asunción (H)	Bolivia	2–1	1998 FIFA World Cup qualification	Benítez, Gamarra	40,341	
445	12 October 1997	Estadio Defensores del Chaco, Asunción (H)	Venezuela	1–0	1998 FIFA World Cup qualification	Torres	35,000	
446	16 November 1997	Estadio Nacional, Lima (A)	Peru	0–1	1998 FIFA World Cup qualification		30,000	
447	8 February 1998	Estadio Defensores del Chaco, Asunción (H)	Poland	4–0	Friendly	Benítez, Arce, Ayala, V. Ferreira	25,000	
448	14 March 1998	San Diego Stadium, San Diego (A)	United States	2–2	Friendly	Caniza	15,253	
449	18 March 1998	Estadio Azteca, Mexico City (A)	Mexico	1–1	Friendly	Benítez	95,000	
450	28 March 1998	Yale Bowl, New Haven (N)	Colombia	1–1	Friendly	Benítez	25,000	
451	22 April 1998	Stadio Ennio Tardini, Parma (A)	Italy	1–3	Friendly	Costacurta (o.g.)	25,000	
452	17 May 1998	Yoyogi National Stadium, Tokyo (N)	Japan	1–1	Kirin Cup	Ayala	53,408	
453	21 May 1998	Kobe Universiade Memorial Stadium, Kobe (N)	Czech Republic	0–1	Kirin Cup		6,100	
454	1 June 1998	Philips Stadion, Eindhoven (A)	Netherlands	1–5	Friendly	Campos	22,000	
455	3 June 1998	Stadionul Steaua, Bucharest (A)	Romania	2–3	Friendly	Cardozo, Acuña	12,000	
456	6 June 1998	King Baudouin Stadium, Brussels (A)	Belgium	0–1	Friendly		30,610	
457	12 June 1998	Stade de la Mosson, Montpellier (N)	Bulgaria	0–0	1998 FIFA World Cup		29,800	
458	19 June 1998	Stade Geoffroy-Guichard, Saint-Étienne (N)	Spain	0–0	1998 FIFA World Cup		30,600	
459	24 June 1998	Stade de Toulouse, Toulouse (N)	Nigeria	3–1	1998 FIFA World Cup	Ayala, Benítez, Cardozo	33,500	
460	28 June 1998	Stade Félix-Bollaert, Lens (N)	France	0–1 (a.e.t./g.g.)	1998 FIFA World Cup		31,800	
461	10 February 1999	Lansdowne Road, Dublin (A)	Republic of Ireland	0–2	Friendly		27,600	
462	3 March 1999	Estadio Mateo Flores, Guatemala City (N)	Guatemala	3–2	Copa de la Paz	Peralta, Centurión, T. González	20,000	
463	5 March 1999	Estadio Mateo Flores, Guatemala City (N)	Jamaica	3–1	Copa de la Paz	C. González, R. Román (2)	10,000	
464	7 March 1999	Estadio Mateo Flores, Guatemala City (N)	Bolivia	3–0	Copa de la Paz	Caballero, Toledo, T. González	10,000	
465	31 March 1999	Kingston (A)	Jamaica	0–3	Friendly		25,000	
466	22 April 1999	Estadio Feliciano Cáceres, Luque (H)	Colombia	0–2	Friendly		20,000	
467	28 April 1999	Estadio Río Parapití, Pedro Juan Caballero (H)	Mexico	2–1	Friendly	Cáceres, Cabellero	20,000	
468	17 June 1999	Estadio Antonio Oddone Sarubbi, Ciudad del Este (H)	Uruguay	2–3	Friendly	Santa Cruz, Toledo	30,000	
469	24 June 1999	Estadio Defensores del Chaco, Asunción (H)	Colombia	2–1	Friendly	Ovelar, Ayala	11,000	
470	29 June 1999	Estadio Defensores del Chaco, Asunción (N)	Bolivia	0–0	1999 Copa América		42,000	
471	2 July 1999	Estadio Defensores del Chaco, Asunción (N)	Japan	4–0	1999 Copa América	Benítez (2), Santa Cruz (2)	40,000	
472	5 July 1999	Estadio Río Parapití, Pedro Juan Caballero (N)	Peru	1–0	1999 Copa América	Santa Cruz	20,000	
473	10 July 1999	Estadio Defensores del Chaco, Asunción (N)	Uruguay	1–1 (3–5p)	1999 Copa América	Benítez	45,000	
474	13 October 1999	Soldier Field, Chicago (N)	Mexico	1–0	Friendly	Toledo	13,125	
475	15 October 1999	Estadio Mateo Flores, Guatemala City (A)	Guatemala	0–0	Friendly		17,000	
476	3 November 1999	Estadio Nueva España, Buenos Aires (N)	Bolivia	0–0	Copa Paz del Chaco		12,000	
477	17 November 1999	Estadio Domingo Burgueño, Maldonado (A)	Uruguay	1–0	Friendly	Benítez	12,000	

== Record by opponent ==
Team	Pld	W	D	L	GF	GA	GD	WPCT
Argentina	13	3	6	4	10	14	−4	23.08
Armenia	1	0	0	1	1	2	−1	0.00
Bahrain	1	1	0	0	2	1	+1	100.00
Belgium	2	0	1	1	2	3	−1	0.00
Bolivia	24	11	9	4	32	18	+14	45.83
Brazil	14	0	4	10	4	29	−25	0.00
Bulgaria	1	0	1	0	0	0	0	0.00
Canada	1	0	1	0	0	0	0	0.00
China	1	1	0	0	2	0	+2	100.00
Chile	16	7	3	6	16	17	−1	43.75
Colombia	18	5	5	8	13	24	−11	27.78
Czech Republic	1	0	0	1	0	1	−1	0.00
Denmark	1	1	0	0	2	1	+1	100.00
Ecuador	10	5	0	5	14	14	0	50.00
El Salvador	2	2	0	0	3	1	+2	100.00
England	1	0	0	1	0	3	−3	0.00
France	1	0	0	1	0	1	−1	0.00
Guatemala	3	2	1	0	5	3	+2	66.67
Honduras	2	1	1	0	2	0	+2	50.00
Indonesia	1	1	0	0	3	2	+1	100.00
Iraq	1	1	0	0	1	0	+1	100.00
Italy	1	0	0	1	1	3	−2	0.00
Jamaica	4	3	0	1	10	5	+5	75.00
Japan	3	2	1	0	7	2	+5	66.67
Mexico	6	3	2	1	8	7	+1	50.00
Netherlands	1	0	0	1	1	5	−4	0.00
New Zealand	1	1	0	0	3	2	+1	100.00
Nigeria	1	1	0	0	3	1	+2	100.00
Peru	13	9	3	1	23	10	+13	69.23
Poland	1	1	0	0	4	0	+4	100.00
Qatar	2	1	1	0	4	1	+3	50.00
Republic of Ireland	1	0	0	1	0	2	−2	0.00
Romania	1	0	0	1	2	3	−1	0.00
Saudi Arabia	1	0	1	0	0	0	0	0.00
South Korea	1	1	0	0	3	1	+2	100.00
Spain	1	0	1	0	0	1	−1	0.00
Trinidad and Tobago	2	0	2	0	3	3	0	0.00
Turkey	1	0	1	0	0	0	0	0.00
United States	2	0	2	0	2	2	0	0.00
Uruguay	14	4	3	7	13	19	−6	28.57
Venezuela	7	6	1	0	16	3	+13	85.71
Total	179	73	50	56	215	204	+11	40.78

Source: Results
