= List of Paraguay international footballers =

The Paraguay national football team has represented Paraguay in international football since 1910. Organized by the Paraguayan Football Association (Spanish: Asociación Paraguaya de Fútbol), it is one of the 10 members of CONMEBOL. The team's first international was a 1–5 defeat to Argentina on 11 May 1919.

== Players ==
Key
§	Player is active with Paraguay and has been called up to the squad within the last 12 months
**Bold**	Player is still active to be called-up

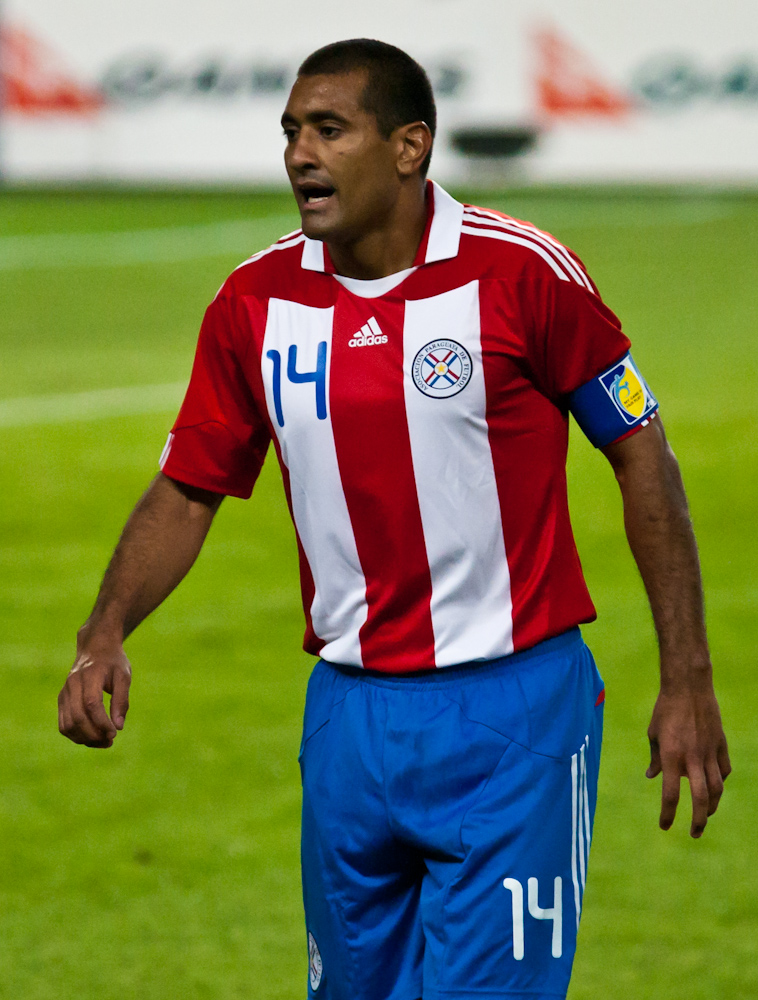
Paulo da Silva is Paraguay's most capped international of all time with 148 caps.

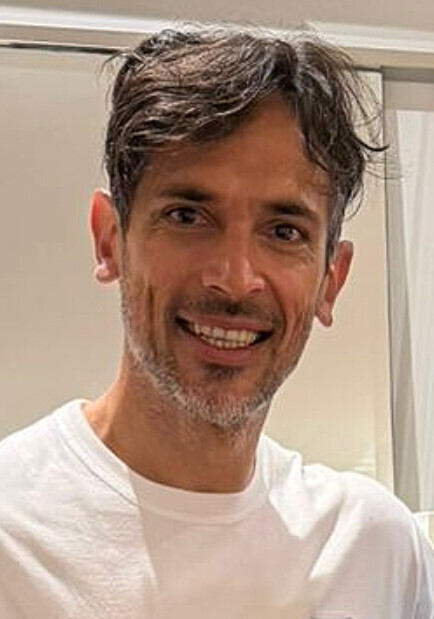
Roque Santa Cruz is Paraguay's top goalscorer with 32 goals from 112 caps.

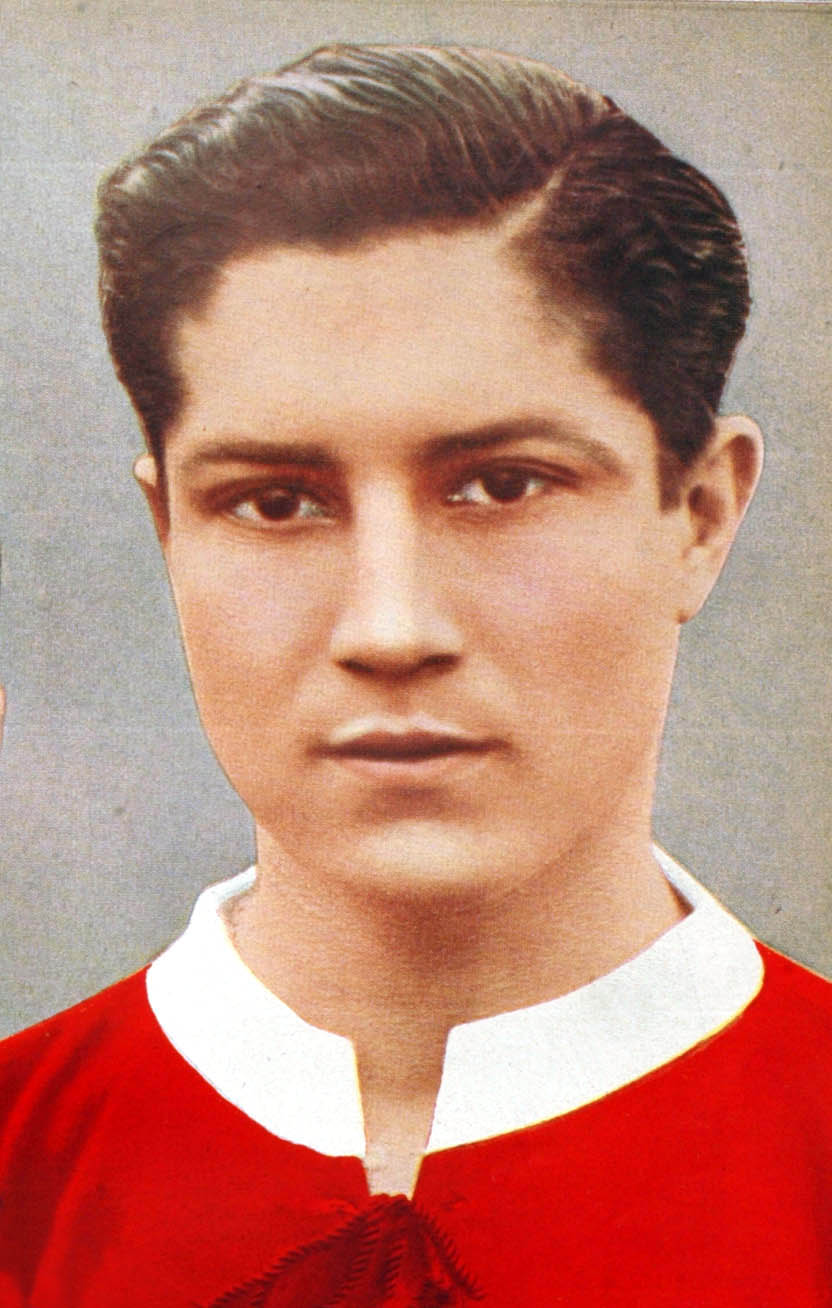
Arsenio Erico (national career 1933–1934) was selected as the 49th-best World player of 20th century in an IFFHS poll.

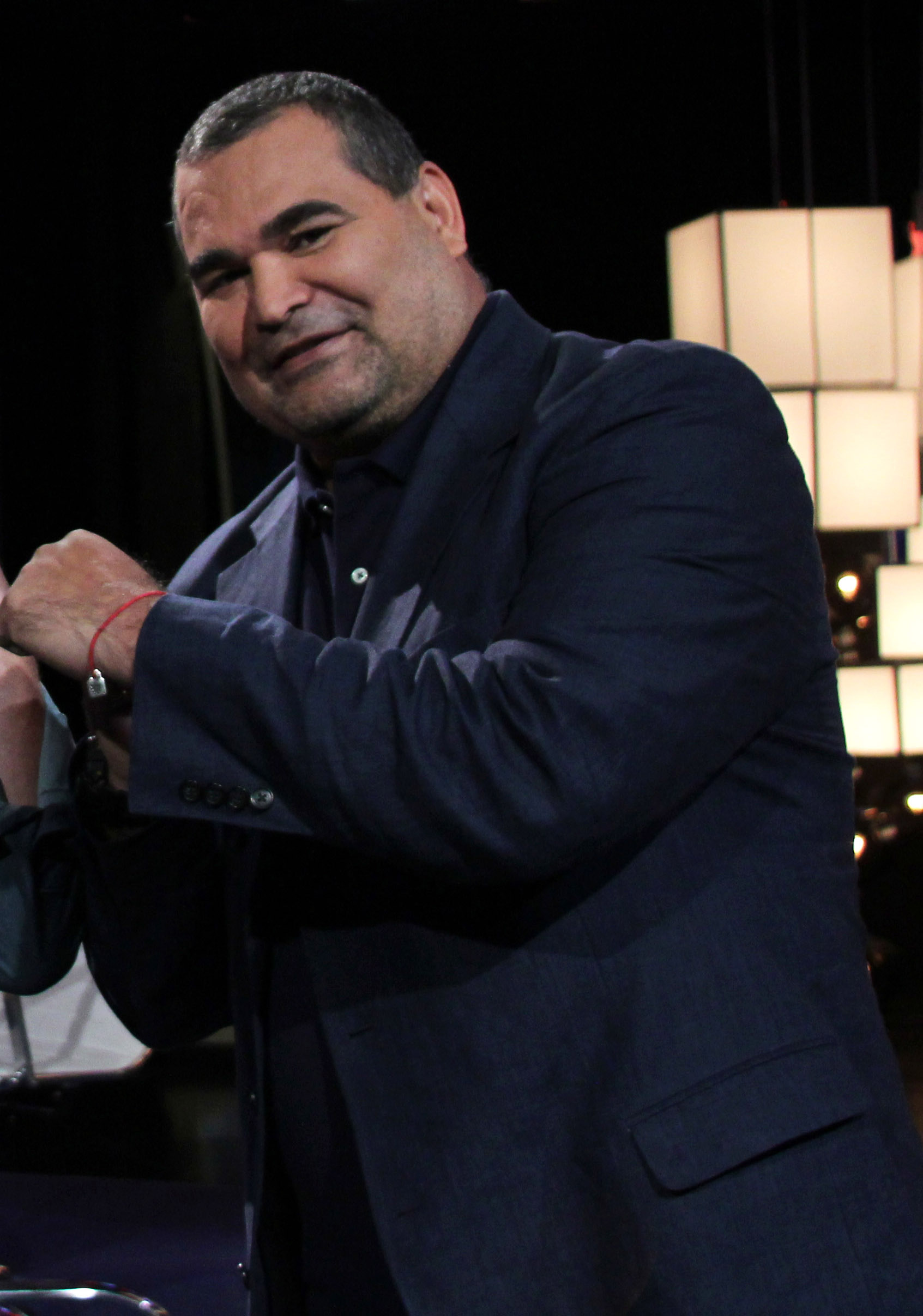
José Luis Chilavert (74 caps, 8 goals) was selected as the 6th-best World keeper of 20th century in an IFFHS poll.

Player	Caps	Goals	National career
Paulo da Silva	148	3	2000–2017
Justo Villar	120	0	1999–2018
Roque Santa Cruz	112	32	1999–2016
Carlos Gamarra	110	12	1993–2006
Cristian Riveros	101	16	2005–2018
Roberto Acuña	100	5	1993–2011
Denis Caniza	100	1	1996–2010
**Gustavo Gómez**	96	4	2013–2026
Celso Ayala	85	6	1993–2003
José Saturnino Cardozo	82	25	1991–2006
**Miguel Almirón**	82	12	2015–2026
Carlos Bonet	80	1	2002–2013
Roberto "Gato" Fernández	78	0	1976–1989
Nelson Haedo Valdez	77	13	2004–2016
**Júnior Alonso**	77	3	2013–2026
Juan Torales	77	1	1979–1989
Carlos Paredes	74	10	1998–2008
José Luis Chilavert	74	8	1989–2003
Estanislao Struway	74	4	1991–2002
Víctor Cáceres	73	2	2005–2017
Julio César Enciso	70	2	1995–2004
Julio César Cáceres	64	2	2002–2010
Francisco Arce	61	5	1995–2004
Édgar Barreto	60	3	2004–2011
Óscar Cardozo	58	12	2006–2023
**Óscar Romero**	58	4	2013–2026
**Édgar Benítez**	56	8	2008–2017
Antony Silva	56	0	2011–2023
Rogelio Delgado	53	6	1983–1990
Catalino Rivarola	53	4	1988–1998
**Derlis González**	52	9	2014–2024
**Ángel Romero**	52	8	2013–2026
Enrique Vera	52	4	2007–2011
**Mathías Villasanti**	52	0	2019–2026
Darío Verón	51	1	2001–2017
**Antonio Sanabria**	50	7	2013–2026
Alcides Sosa	49	3	1968–1977
**Fabián Balbuena**	49	2	2015–2026
César Zabala	49	2	1985–1991
Jorge Guasch	47	0	1985–1991
Pedro Sarabia	47	0	1995–2006
Jorge Campos	46	6	1995–2004
Salvador Cabañas	45	10	2003–2009
Virginio Cáceres	45	2	1985–1989
Aureliano Torres	45	2	2004–2012
Vicente Bobadilla	45	0	1960–1971
Buenaventura Ferreira	44	7	1985–1993
Alfredo Mendoza	43	9	1983–1993
Diego Gavilán	43	0	1999–2007
Nelson Cuevas	42	6	1999–2007
**Omar Alderete**	42	3	2018–2026
Gustavo Benítez	42	2	1975–1985
**Hernán Pérez**	41	2	2010–2021
**Miguel Samudio**	41	1	2000–2017
Salvador Villalba	41	1	1955–1960
Justo Jacquet	40	4	1983–1991
**Andrés Cubas**	40	0	2019–2026
**Richard Ortiz**	39	6	2011–2023
**Julio Enciso**	39	5	2021–2026
Ramón Hicks	37	6	1983–1987
**Iván Piris**	37	0	2011–2023
Lucas Barrios	36	10	2010–2017
Delio Toledo	35	4	1999–2008
Jonathan Santana	35	1	2007–2016
Eligio Echagüe	35	0	1955–1961
Claudio Morel Rodríguez	35	0	1999–2010
Julio César Romero "Romerito"	34	13	1979–1990
Eumelio Palacios	34	6	1987–1989
**Alejandro Romero Gamarra "Kaku"**	34	6	2018–2026
Gabriel González	34	2	1987–2001
Castor Cantero	34	0	1942–1950
Idalino Monges	34	0	1959–1971
Silvio Suárez	34	0	1991–1997
Julio dos Santos	33	5	2004–2014
Néstor Ortigoza	33	1	1991–1997
**Richard Sánchez**	33	1	2018–2023
Alicio Solalinde	32	4	1975–1981
Manuel Fleitas Solich	32	3	1919–1926
**Marcelo Estigarribia**	32	1	2008–2012
Julio Manzur	32	1	2005–2012
Osvaldo Martínez	32	1	2008–2015
**Ramón Sosa**	32	1	2022–2026
**Bruno Valdez**	32	1	2015–2022
Gerardo Rivas	31	10	1921–1926
Aldo Florentín	31	4	1979–1983
Manuel Gavilán	31	1	1947–1954
**Roberto "Gatito" Fernández**	31	0	2013–2026
Ricardo Tavarelli	31	0	1998–2004
Miguel Ángel Benítez	30	11	1996–1999
Ildefonso López	30	8	1921–1926
**Diego Gómez**	30	3	2022–2026
Jorge Amado Nunes	30	1	1985–1993
Modesto Denis	30	0	1922–1930
Adolfino Cañete	29	3	1985–1989
Edelmiro Arévalo	29	0	1956–1961
Roberto Cabañas	28	11	1981–1993
Luis Fretes	28	7	1922–1929
Dante López	28	2	2003–2013
**Juan Rodrigo Rojas**	28	0	2009–2020
Luis Torres	28	0	1975–1980
Saturnino Arrúa	27	13	1969–1980
Julio César Franco	27	5	1988–1989
Pablo Aguilar	27	4	2007–2016
Arístides Rojas	27	4	1996–1998
**Gabriel Ávalos**	27	2	2021–2026
Luis Neri Caballero	27	0	1983–1989
Ángel Ortiz	27	0	2003–2007
Lorenzo Jiménez	26	4	1969–1973
Richart Báez	26	3	1995–2002
Vladimiro Schettina	26	2	1979–1986
José Insfrán	26	1	1974–1977
**Robert Rojas**	26	1	2019–2023
Juan Lezcano	26	0	1957–1963
Sergio Rojas	26	0	1964–1971
Virgilio Ferreira	25	7	1993–2002
Guido Alvarenga	25	3	1995–2002

== See also ==
- Football in Paraguay
