= 1996 in Paraguayan football =

The following article presents a summary of the 1996 football (soccer) season in Paraguay.

== First division ==
Thirteen teams participated in the championship which was played in two tournament (Apertura and Clausura), being the champions Guaraní and Cerro Porteño. In the Final Apertura versus Clausura Champions, Club Cerro Porteño won its 24th championship.

=== Relegation/Promotion ===
- Deportivo Humaitá automatically relegated to the second division after finishing last in the season-wide aggregate table.
- Cerro Corá promoted to the first division by winning the second division tournament.

=== Qualification to international competitions ===
- Club Guaraní qualified to the 1997 Copa Libertadores by winning the Torneo Apertura.
- Cerro Porteño qualified to the 1997 Copa Libertadores by winning the Torneo Clausura.
- Sportivo Luqueño qualified to the 1997 Copa Conmebol like the runner-up of the Torneo Apertura.

== Paraguay national team ==
Date	Venue	Opponents	Score	Comp	Paraguay scorers	Fixture
1996-02-14	Estadio Olímpico Patria; Sucre, Bolivia	Bolivia	4–1	F	Unknown	424
1996-04-21	Estadio Defensores del Chaco; Asunción, Paraguay	Herzeg-Bosnia	3–0	F	Gamarra 21'; Báez 53'; Ferreira 60'	425
1996-04-24	Estadio Metropolitano; Barranquilla, Colombia	Colombia	1–0	WCQ 1998		426
1996-06-02	Estadio Centenario; Montevideo, Uruguay	Uruguay	0–2	WCQ 1998	Arce 10'; Rojas 88'	427
1996-06-26	Estadio Defensores del Chaco; Asunción, Paraguay	Armenia	1–2	F	Esteche 45'	428
1996-07-26	Estadio Defensores del Chaco; Asunción, Paraguay	Bolivia	2–0	F	Ayala 26'; Cardozo 54'	429
1996-08-08	Workers Stadium; Beijing, PR China	China	0–2	F	Unknown	430
1996-09-01	Estadio Monumental; Buenos Aires, Argentina	Argentina	1–1	WCQ 1998	Chilavert 42'	431
1996-10-09	Estadio Defensores del Chaco; Asunción, Paraguay	Chile	2–1	WCQ 1998	Gamarra 24'; Rivarola 63'	432
1996-11-10	Estadio Defensores del Chaco; Asunción, Paraguay	Ecuador	1–0	WCQ 1998	Benítez 23'	433
1996-12-15	Estadio Hernando Siles; La Paz, Bolivia	Bolivia	0–0	WCQ 1998		434
