= 1996–97 in Venezuelan football =

This article presents a summary of the 1996-97 football season in Venezuela.

== Torneo Apertura ("Opening" Tournament) ==
Pos	Team	Points	Played	Won	Drawn	Lost	For	Against	Diff
1	Minervén Fútbol Club	43	22	13	4	5	33	15	+18
2	Atlético Zulia	43	22	13	4	5	31	20	+11
3	Unión Atlético Táchira	41	22	12	5	5	35	19	+16
4	Caracas F.C.	38	22	11	5	6	28	20	+8
5	Mineros de Guayana	38	22	11	5	6	31	24	+7
6	Estudiantes de Mérida F.C.	31	22	9	4	9	21	23	–2
7	Trujillanos F.C.	30	22	7	9	6	25	20	+5
8	Deportivo Chacao	28	22	8	4	10	28	32	–4
9	Llaneros de Guanare	22	22	5	7	10	22	32	–10
10	Atlético El Vigía	21	22	5	6	11	17	26	–9
11	Valencia FC	18	22	4	6	12	15	29	–14
12	Nacional Táchira	12	22	3	3	16	15	40	–25

== Torneo Clausura ("Closing" Tournament) ==
Pos	Team	Points	Played	Won	Drawn	Lost	For	Against	Diff
1	Caracas F.C.	36	18	11	3	4	36	18	+18
2	Unión Atlético Táchira	35	18	10	5	3	32	18	+14
3	Estudiantes de Mérida F.C.	29	18	8	5	5	21	14	+7
4	Trujillanos F.C.	25	18	6	7	5	19	17	+2
5	Mineros de Guayana	25	18	7	4	7	30	29	+1
6	Atlético Zulia	24	18	5	9	4	28	28	0
7	Minervén Fútbol Club	23	18	6	5	7	20	19	+1
8	Deportivo Chacao	23	18	6	5	7	20	28	–8
9	Llaneros de Guanare	21	18	4	9	5	23	25	–2
10	Atlético El Vigía	18	18	0	2	16	7	40	–33

== Venezuela national team ==
Date	Venue	Opponents	Score	Comp	Venezuela scorers	Fixture
1996-09-01	Estadio Olímpico Atahualpa; Quito, Ecuador	Ecuador	1 - 0	WCQ98		132
1996-09-18	Estadio Cuscatlán; San Salvador, El Salvador	El Salvador	0 - 1	F	Castellín 69'	133
1996-10-03	Estadio Agustín Tovar; Barinas, Venezuela	Costa Rica	2 - 0	F	García 51'; Morán 60'	134
1996-10-09	Estadio Pueblo Nuevo; San Cristóbal, Venezuela	Argentina	2 - 5	WCQ98	Savarese 7'; Dudamel 87'	135
1996-11-10	Estadio Nacional; Lima, Peru	Peru	4 - 1	WCQ98	Díaz 78'	136
1996-10-09	Estadio Pueblo Nuevo; San Cristóbal, Venezuela	Colombia	0 - 2	WCQ98		137
1997-01-12	Estadio Guillermo Soto Rosa; Mérida, Venezuela	Paraguay	0 - 2	WCQ98		138
1997-02-12	Independence Park; Kingston, Jamaica	Jamaica	0 - 0	F		139
1997-02-19	Estadio Eladio Rosabal Cordero; Heredia, Costa Rica	Costa Rica	5 - 2	F	Díaz 29'; Palencia 59'	140
1997-04-02	Estadio Centenario; Montevideo, Uruguay	Uruguay	3 - 1	WCQ98	Castellín 75'	141
1997-04-29	Estadio Monumental; Santiago, Chile	Chile	6 - 0	WCQ98		142
1997-06-08	Estadio Luis Loreto Lira; Valera, Venezuela	Bolivia	1 - 1	WCQ98	Savarese 70'	143
1997-06-12	Estadio Hernando Siles; La Paz, Bolivia	Bolivia	1 - 0	CA97	-	144
1997-06-15	Estadio Olímpico Patria; Sucre, Bolivia	Uruguay	2 - 0	CA97	-	145
1997-06-18	Estadio Olímpico Patria; Sucre, Bolivia	Peru	2 - 0	CA97	-	146
1997-07-06	Estadio José Pachencho Romero; Maracaibo, Venezuela	Ecuador	1 - 1	WCQ98	Miranda 75'	147
1997-07-20	Estadio Monumental; Buenos Aires, Argentina	Argentina	2 - 0	WCQ98		148
