= Miguel Ángel Benítez =

Miguel Ángel Benítez may refer to:

- Miguel Ángel Benítez (footballer) (born 1970), Paraguayan football manager and former forward
- Miguel Benítez (footballer) (born 1997), Paraguayan football left-back
