= List of Paraguay international footballers born outside Paraguay =

This is a list of football players who have represented the Paraguay national football team in international football since 1910 and were born outside Paraguay.

== List of Players ==
The following players:

1. have played at least one game for the full (senior male) Paraguay national team since 1910; and
2. were born outside Paraguay.

This list includes players who have dual citizenship with Paraguay and/or have become naturalised Paraguayan citizens. The players are ordered per modern-day country of birth.

List of players
Country of birth	Player	Caps	Goals	Period
Argentina	Roberto Acuña	100	5	1993–2011
Argentina	Sergio Aquino	16	0	2008–2013
Argentina	**Santiago Arzamendia**	24	0	2019–2024
Argentina	Lucas Barrios	36	10	2010–2017
Argentina	**Raúl Bobadilla**	11	0	2015–2020
Argentina	**Juan José Cáceres**	24	0	2023–
Argentina	Cristino Centurión	7	0	1986
Argentina	**Andrés Cubas**	40	0	2019–
Argentina	Ignacio Don	3	0	2015
Argentina	Javier Espínola	2	1	1996
Argentina	Jonathan Fabbro	13	4	2012–2015
Argentina	**Gastón Giménez**	9	1	2018–2021
Argentina	**Juan Iturbe**	12	0	2009–2019
Argentina	Adolfo Lazzarini	5	0	1977
Argentina	**David Martínez**	11	1	2021–2022
Argentina	Ricardo Mazacotte	2	1	2012
Argentina	Jorge Mendoza	5	0	2011–2012
Argentina	Jorge Amado Nunes	30	1	1985–1993
Argentina	Bernabé Núñez	1	0	1919
Argentina	Néstor Ortigoza	31	1	2009–2017
Argentina	Ricardo Rojas	9	0	1997–1998
Argentina	**Alejandro Romero Gamarra "Kaku"**	35	6	2018–
Argentina	**Agustín Sández**	5	0	2024–
Argentina	Jonathan Santana	35	1	2007–2016
Argentina	**Héctor Villalba**	4	0	2018–2023
Argentina	Hernán Villalba	1	0	2015
Brazil	**Carlos Coronel**	9	0	2023–
Brazil	**Maurício Magalhães**	9	1	2026–
Brazil	Pablo Nascimento	1	0	1993
Uruguay	Ever Almeida	22	0	1973–1985
Uruguay	**Gastón Olveira**	2	0	2026–

== See also ==
- List of Paraguay international footballers
