= Manuel Marengo =

Peruvian footballer (born 1973)

Personal information
- Full name: Luis Manuel Carmelo Marengo Ramos
- Date of birth: 16 July 1973 (age 53)
- Place of birth: Lima, Peru
- Height: 1.85 m (6 ft 1 in)
- Position: Defender

Youth career
- Deportivo Zúñiga

Senior career*
Years	Team	Apps	(Gls)
1994–1996	Alianza Lima	47	(3)
1997–2002	Sporting Cristal	83	(3)
2002	Alianza Atlético	19	(0)
2003	Coronel Bolognesi	26	(0)
2004	Alianza Atlético	23	(1)
2005–2006	Coronel Bolognesi	73	(4)
2007	Sport Boys	28	(3)
2008	Cienciano	43	(3)
2009	Juan Aurich	18	(1)
2010	Sport Boys	14	(0)
2011–2012	Atlético Torino	14	(3)
2013	Deportivo Coopsol	?	(?)

International career
1996–2003	Peru	13	(2)
- * Club domestic league appearances and goals as of 26 November 2011

Luis Manuel Carmelo Marengo Ramos (born 16 July 1973) is a retired Peruvian footballer who last played for Deportivo Coopsol in the Segunda División Peruana.

== Club career ==
Marengo previously played for a number of clubs in Peru, including Alianza Lima, Sporting Cristal, Coronel Bolognesi and Cienciano.

== International career ==
Marengo has made 13 appearances for the senior Peru national football team from 1996 to 2003.

== Career statistics ==
=== International ===
Appearances and goals by national team and year
National team	Year	Apps	Goals
Peru	1996	7	0
Peru	1997	3	1
Peru	1998	–	
Peru	1999	–	
Peru	2000	1	0
Peru	2001	–	
Peru	2002	–	
Peru	2003	2	1
Total		13	2

Scores and results list Peru's goal tally first, score column indicates score after each Marengo goal.

List of international goals scored by Manuel Marengo
No.	Date	Venue	Opponent	Score	Result	Competition
1	20 August 1997	Estadio Agustín Tovar, Barinas, Venezuela	Venezuela	1–0	3–0	1998 FIFA World Cup qualification
2	24 July 2003	National Stadium of Peru, Lima, Peru	Uruguay	2–1	3–4	Friendly
