= 1998 FIFA World Cup qualification (CONMEBOL) =

Tournament details
- Dates: 24 April 1996 – 16 November 1997
- Teams: 9 (from 1 confederation)

Tournament statistics
- Matches played: 72
- Goals scored: 184 (2.56 per match)
- Attendance: 2,806,242 (38,976 per match)
- Top scorer(s): (Chile) Iván Zamorano (12 goals)

Listed below are the dates and results for the 1998 FIFA World Cup qualification rounds for the South American zone (CONMEBOL). For an overview of the qualification rounds, see the article 1998 FIFA World Cup qualification.

A total of 10 CONMEBOL teams entered the competition. The South American zone was allocated 5 places (out of 32) in the final tournament. Brazil, the defending champions, qualified automatically, leaving 4 spots open for competition between 9 teams.

This was the first World Cup qualifying competition to involve all of the yet-unqualified teams in the confederation playing against each other home and away to decide places in the tournament, a format that was replicated for subsequent World Cup qualifying competitions between CONMEBOL members.

== Standings ==
Pos	Team	Pld	W	D	L	GF	GA	GD	Pts	Qualification	(Argentina)	(Paraguay)	(Colombia)	(Chile)	(Peru)	(Ecuador)	(Uruguay)	(Bolivia)	(Venezuela)
1	Argentina	16	8	6	2	23	13	+10	30	1998 FIFA World Cup	—	1–1	1–1	1–1	2–0	2–1	0–0	3–1	2–0
2	Paraguay	16	9	2	5	21	14	+7	29	1998 FIFA World Cup	1–2	—	2–1	2–1	2–1	1–0	3–1	2–1	1–0
3	Colombia	16	8	4	4	23	15	+8	28	1998 FIFA World Cup	0–1	1–0	—	4–1	0–1	1–0	3–1	3–0	1–0
4	Chile	16	7	4	5	32	18	+14	25	1998 FIFA World Cup	1–2	2–1	4–1	—	4–0	4–1	1–0	3–0	6–0
5	Peru	16	7	4	5	19	20	−1	25		1–1	1–0	1–1	2–1	—	1–1	2–1	2–1	4–1
6	Ecuador	16	6	3	7	22	21	+1	21		2–0	2–1	0–1	1–1	4–1	—	4–0	1–0	1–0
7	Uruguay	16	6	3	7	18	21	−3	21		0–0	0–2	1–1	1–0	2–0	5–3	—	1–0	3–1
8	Bolivia	16	4	5	7	18	21	−3	17		2–1	0–0	2–2	1–1	0–0	2–0	1–0	—	6–1
9	Venezuela	16	0	3	13	8	41	−33	3		2–5	0–2	0–2	1–1	0–3	1–1	0–2	1–1	—

== Matches ==
=== Matchday 1 ===
24 April 1996
19:15 UTC−4

Venezuela	0–2	Uruguay
		Otero 54'; Poyet 71'

Estadio Brígido Iriarte, Caracas
Attendance: 6,839
Referee: Alberto Tejada Noriega (Peru)

24 April 1996
20:00 UTC−5

Ecuador	4–1	Peru
Hurtado 54', 88'; Tenorio 65'; Gavica 78'		Palacios 62'

Estadio Monumental Isidro Romero Carbo, Guayaquil
Attendance: 60,000
Referee: Julio Matto Estoceres (Uruguay)

24 April 1996
20:10 UTC−5

Colombia	1–0	Paraguay
Asprilla 53'

Estadio Metropolitano Roberto Meléndez, Barranquilla
Attendance: 31,600
Referee: Javier Castrilli (Argentina)

24 April 1996
21:10 UTC−3

Argentina	3–1	Bolivia
Ortega 8', 18'; Batistuta 59'		Baldivieso 42'

Estadio Monumental Antonio Vespucio Liberti, Buenos Aires
Attendance: 49,750
Referee: Mario Sánchez Yanten (Chile)

=== Matchday 2 ===
2 June 1996
11:30 UTC−5

Ecuador	2–0	Argentina
Montaño 51'; Hurtado 89'

Estadio Olímpico Atahualpa, Quito
Attendance: 41,500
Referee: Armando Perez Hoyos (Colombia)

2 June 1996
15:30 UTC−3

Uruguay	0–2	Paraguay
		Arce 10'; Rojas 88'

Estadio Centenario, Montevideo
Attendance: 44,127
Referee: Marcio Rezende de Freitas (Brazil)

2 June 1996
17:00 UTC−4

Venezuela	1–1	Chile
Guerra 7'		Margas 89'

Estadio La Carolina, Barinas
Attendance: 8,074
Referee: Epifanio Gonzalez (Paraguay)

2 June 1996
16:00 UTC−5

Peru	1–1	Colombia
Reynoso 47'		Aristizábal 60'

Estadio Nacional, Lima
Attendance: 43,345
Referee: Alfredo Rodas (Ecuador)

=== Matchday 3 ===
6 July 1996
18:30 UTC−4

Chile	4–1	Ecuador
Zamorano 27', 86'; Salas 75'; Estay 83'		Aguinaga 73'

Estadio Nacional, Santiago
Attendance: 74,905
Referee: Pablo Peña (Bolivia)

7 July 1996
15:30 UTC−5

Colombia	3–1	Uruguay
Asprilla 7'; Valderrama 20'; De Ávila 78'		Cedrés 57'

Estadio Metropolitano Roberto Meléndez, Barranquilla
Attendance: 36,169
Referee: Ruben Ruscio (Argentina)

7 July 1996
15:30 UTC−5

Peru	0–0	Argentina

Estadio Nacional, Lima
Attendance: 43,675
Referee: Wilson de Souza Mendonça (Brazil)

7 July 1996
16:00 UTC−4

Bolivia	6–1	Venezuela
Sandy 4'; Etcheverry 41' (pen.); Baldivieso 61'; Coimbra 67'; Suárez 78'; Paniagua 85'		Tortolero 65' (pen.)

Estadio Hernando Siles, La Paz
Attendance: 43,822
Referee: Jose Luis da Rosa (Uruguay)

=== Matchday 4 ===
1 September 1996
11:30 UTC−5

Ecuador	1–0	Venezuela
Aguinaga 4'

Estadio Olímpico Atahualpa, Quito
Attendance: 36,889
Referee: Carlos Robles (Chile)

1 September 1996
15:00 UTC−4

Bolivia	0–0	Peru

Estadio Hernando Siles, La Paz
Attendance: 48,304
Referee: Oscar Alvarenga (Paraguay)

1 September 1996
16:00 UTC−5

Colombia	4–1	Chile
Asprilla 3', 31', 47'; Bermúdez 43'		Zamorano 56' (pen.)

Estadio Metropolitano Roberto Meléndez, Barranquilla
Attendance: 34,000
Referee: Sidrack Marinho dos Santos (Brazil)

1 September 1996
18:15 UTC−3

Argentina	1–1	Paraguay
Batistuta 27'		Chilavert 42'

Estadio Monumental Antonio Vespucio Liberti, Buenos Aires
Attendance: 65,500
Referee: Antônio Pereira da Silva (Brazil)

=== Matchday 5 ===
8 October 1996
20:30 UTC−3

Uruguay	1–0	Bolivia
Peña 64' (o.g.)

Estadio Centenario, Montevideo
Attendance: 60,000
Referee: Paolo Borgosano (Venezuela)

9 October 1996
11:30 UTC−5

Ecuador	0–1	Colombia
		Asprilla 72'

Estadio Olímpico Atahualpa, Quito
Attendance: 45,000
Referee: Horacio Elizondo (Argentina)

9 October 1996
20:00 UTC−4

Venezuela	2–5	Argentina
Savarese 7'; Dudamel 87'		Ortega 35'; Sorín 68'; Simeone 77'; Morales 86'; Albornoz 90+1'

Estadio Polideportivo de Pueblo Nuevo, San Cristóbal
Attendance: 30,000
Referee: Eduardo Dluzniewski (Uruguay)

9 October 1996
21:10 UTC−3

Paraguay	2–1	Chile
Gamarra 24'; Rivarola 63'		Margas 22'

Estadio Defensores del Chaco, Asunción
Attendance: 45,000
Referee: Oscar Ruiz (Colombia)

=== Matchday 6 ===
10 November 1996
15:00 UTC−4

Bolivia	2–2	Colombia
Sandy 15'; Moreno 44'		Serna 40' (pen.); Rincón 54'

Estadio Hernando Siles, La Paz
Attendance: 43,173
Referee: Jose Villamonte (Peru)

10 November 1996
15:30 UTC−5

Peru	4–1	Venezuela
Reynoso 4'; Julinho 21'; Palacios 49', 83'		Díaz 78'

Estadio Nacional, Lima
Attendance: 31,036
Referee: René Ortubé (Bolivia)

10 November 1996
18:00 UTC−3

Paraguay	1–0	Ecuador
Benítez 24'

Estadio Defensores del Chaco, Asunción
Attendance: 31,002
Referee: Daniel Giménez (Argentina)

12 November 1996
21:30 UTC−3

Chile	1–0	Uruguay
Salas 60'

Estadio Nacional, Santiago
Attendance: 73,547
Referee: Angel Guevara (Ecuador)

=== Matchday 7 ===
15 December 1996
18:10 UTC−4

Bolivia	0–0	Paraguay

Estadio Hernando Siles, La Paz
Attendance: 45,000
Referee: Jose Luis Parra (Uruguay)

15 December 1996
16:00 UTC−4

Venezuela	0–2	Colombia
		Bermúdez 7'; Valenciano 50'

Estadio Polideportivo de Pueblo Nuevo, San Cristóbal
Attendance: 25,000
Referee: Eduardo Gamboa (Chile)

15 December 1996
20:00 UTC−3

Argentina	1–1	Chile
Batistuta 76' (pen.)		Cornejo 53'

Estadio Monumental Antonio Vespucio Liberti, Buenos Aires
Attendance: 59,970
Referee: Ubaldo Aquino (Paraguay)

15 December 1996
21:10 UTC−3

Uruguay	2–0	Peru
Montero 2'; Bengoechea 38'

Estadio Centenario, Montevideo
Attendance: 42,630
Referee: Felipe Paez (Colombia)

=== Matchday 8 ===
12 January 1997
11:30 UTC−4

Venezuela	0–2	Paraguay
		Benítez 6'; Enciso 62'

Estadio Guillermo Soto Rosa, Mérida
Attendance: 7,981
Referee: Ángel Sánchez (Argentina)

12 January 1997
15:00 UTC−4

Bolivia	2–0	Ecuador
Moreno 7'; Etcheverry 12'

Estadio Hernando Siles, La Paz
Attendance: 39,968
Referee: Oscar Ruiz (Colombia)

12 January 1997
19:10 UTC−3

Uruguay	0–0	Argentina

Estadio Centenario, Montevideo
Attendance: 62,000
Referee: Márcio Rezende de Freitas (Brazil)

12 January 1997
20:00 UTC−5

Peru	2–1	Chile
Maestri 15'; Palacios 34'		Zamorano 88'

Estadio Nacional (Lima), Lima
Attendance: 35,373
Referee: José Varela (Uruguay)

=== Matchday 9 ===
12 February 1997
17:00 UTC−5

Ecuador	4–0	Uruguay
Aguinaga 6'; Delgado 68', 76'; Chalá 87'

Estadio Olímpico Atahualpa, Quito
Attendance: 18,000
Referee: Javier Castrilli (Argentina)

12 February 1997
18:00 UTC−3

Bolivia	1–1	Chile
Soria 28'		González 44'

Estadio Hernando Siles, La Paz
Attendance: 41,908
Referee: Alberto Tejada Noriega (Peru)

12 February 1997
17:00 UTC−5

Colombia	0–1	Argentina
		López 10'

Estadio Metropolitano Roberto Meléndez, Barranquilla
Attendance: 47,000
Referee: Antônio Pereira da Silva (Brazil)

12 February 1997
21:10 UTC−3

Paraguay	2–1	Peru
Rivarola 12'; Rojas 40'		Pereda 33'

Estadio Defensores del Chaco, Asunción
Attendance: 32,000
Referee: Mario Sánchez Yanten (Chile)

=== Matchday 10 ===
2 April 1997
18:00 UTC−4

Bolivia	2–1	Argentina
Sandy 8'; Ochoaizpur 48'		Gorosito 41' (pen.)

Estadio Hernando Siles, La Paz
Attendance: 44,372
Referee: Sidrack Marinho dos Santos (Brazil)

2 April 1997
20:00 UTC−5

Peru	1–1	Ecuador
Palacios 58'		Aguinaga 78' (pen.)

Estadio Nacional, Lima
Attendance: 42,299
Referee: John Toro Rendón (Colombia)

2 April 1997
21:10 UTC−3

Uruguay	3–1	Venezuela
De Los Santos 29'; Montero 46'; Otero 59'		Castellín 55'

Estadio Centenario, Montevideo
Attendance: 37,000
Referee: René Ortubé (Bolivia)

2 April 1997
21:10 UTC−3

Paraguay	2–1	Colombia
Gamarra 6'; Soto 82'		Serna 80' (pen.)

Estadio Defensores del Chaco, Asunción
Attendance: 37,297
Referee: Wilson de Souza Mendonça (Brazil)

=== Matchday 11 ===
29 April 1997
21:15 UTC−4

Chile	6–0	Venezuela
Zamorano 19', 27', 32', 47', 85'; Reyes 66'

Estadio Monumental David Arellano, Santiago
Attendance: 42,034
Referee: Gilberto Alcalá (Mexico)

30 April 1997
21:10 UTC−3

Argentina	2–1	Ecuador
Ortega 18'; Crespo 30'		Aguinaga 73'

Estadio Monumental Antonio Vespucio Liberti, Buenos Aires
Attendance: 62,300
Referee: Félix Ramón Benegas Caballero (Paraguay)

30 April 1997
21:00 UTC−4

Paraguay	3–1	Uruguay
Rojas 37'; Cardozo 73' (pen.); Soto 83'		Silva 87'

Estadio Defensores del Chaco, Asunción
Attendance: 34,101
Referee: Antônio Pereira Da Silva (Brazil)

30 April 1997
21:00 UTC−5

Colombia	0–1	Peru
		Pereda 62'

Estadio Metropolitano Roberto Meléndez, Barranquilla
Attendance: 22,172
Referee: Márcio Rezende de Freitas (Brazil)

=== Matchday 12 ===
8 June 1997
11:30 UTC−5

Ecuador	1–1	Chile
Graziani 43'		Salas 53'

Estadio Olímpico Atahualpa, Quito
Attendance: 42,225
Referee: Benito Archundia (Mexico)

8 June 1997
18:10 UTC−3

Argentina	2–0	Peru
Crespo 44'; Simeone 46'

Estadio Monumental Antonio Vespucio Liberti, Buenos Aires
Attendance: 56,069
Referee: Claudio Vinicius Cerdeira (Brazil)

8 June 1997
15:30 UTC−3

Uruguay	1–1	Colombia
Silva 6'		Ricard 47'

Estadio Centenario, Montevideo
Attendance: 37,200
Referee: Francisco Dacildo Mourao (Brazil)

8 June 1997
16:00 UTC−4

Venezuela	1–1	Bolivia
Savarese 70'		Castillo 80'

Estadio Luis Loreto Lira, Valera
Attendance: 3,352
Referee: Márcio Rezende de Freitas (Brazil)

=== Matchday 13 ===
5 July 1997
20:30 UTC−4

Chile	4–1	Colombia
Salas 16', 26', 41'; Zamorano 90' (pen.)		Ricard 52'

Estadio Nacional, Santiago
Attendance: 75,617
Referee: Paolo Borgozano (Venezuela)

6 July 1997
18:10 UTC−3

Paraguay	1–2	Argentina
Acuña 59' (pen.)		Gallardo 30'; Verón 41'

Estadio Defensores del Chaco, Asunción
Attendance: 30,000
Referee: Márcio Rezende de Freitas (Brazil)

6 July 1997
14:30 UTC−5

Peru	2–1	Bolivia
Carty 9'; Soto 53'		Cristaldo 56'

Estadio Nacional, Lima
Attendance: 31,489
Referee: Wilson de Souza Mendonça (Brazil)

6 July 1997
16:00 UTC−4

Venezuela	1–1	Ecuador
Miranda 75'		Hurtado 55'

Estadio José Pachencho Romero, Maracaibo
Attendance: 4,729
Referee: Arturo Angeles (USA)

=== Matchday 14 ===
20 July 1997
18:10 UTC−3

Argentina	2–0	Venezuela
Crespo 31'; Paz 58'

Estadio Monumental Antonio Vespucio Liberti, Buenos Aires
Attendance: 48,000
Referee: Wilson de Souza Mendonça (Brazil)

20 July 1997
15:00 UTC−4

Bolivia	1–0	Uruguay
Etcheverry 75'

Estadio Hernando Siles, La Paz
Attendance: 27,874
Referee: Arturo Brizio Carter (Mexico)

20 July 1997
15:30 UTC−5

Colombia	1–0	Ecuador
de Ávila 83'

Estadio Metropolitano Roberto Meléndez, Barranquilla
Attendance: 35,000
Referee: Márcio Rezende de Freitas (Brazil)

20 July 1997
20:30 UTC−4

Chile	2–1	Paraguay
Zamorano 9' (pen.), 51'		Brizuela 61'

Estadio Nacional, Santiago
Attendance: 75,143
Referee: Rafael Torrealba (Venezuela)

=== Matchday 15 ===
20 August 1997
20:00 UTC−3

Uruguay	1–0	Chile
Otero 20'

Estadio Centenario, Montevideo
Attendance: 45,000
Referee: Antônio Pereira da Silva (Brazil)

20 August 1997
21:15 UTC−5

Colombia	3–0	Bolivia
De Ávila 1'; Valderrama 30' (pen.); Asprilla 76'

Estadio Metropolitano Roberto Meléndez, Barranquilla
Attendance: 25,912
Referee: Claudio Vinicius Cerdeira (Brazil)

20 August 1997
11:30 UTC−5

Ecuador	2–1	Paraguay
Aguinaga 54'; Graziani 77'		Báez 5'

Estadio Olímpico Atahualpa, Quito
Attendance: 12,000
Referee: Rodrigo Badilla (Costa Rica)

20 August 1997
18:00 UTC−4

Venezuela	0–3	Peru
		Marengo 14'; Julinho 54'; Maestri 81'

Estadio La Carolina, Barinas
Attendance: 10,000
Referee: Peter Prendergast (Jamaica)

=== Matchday 16 ===
10 September 1997
18:00 UTC−4

Chile	1–2	Argentina
Salas 34'		Gallardo 25'; López 86'

Estadio Nacional, Santiago
Attendance: 73,644
Referee: Francisco Mourão Dacildo (Brazil)

10 September 1997
20:10 UTC−5

Peru	2–1	Uruguay
Palacios 57'; Carty 60'		Recoba 43'

Estadio Nacional, Lima
Attendance: 34,721
Referee: Esfandiar Baharmast (USA)

10 September 1997
21:15 UTC−5

Colombia	1–0	Venezuela
Cabrera 68'

Estadio Metropolitano Roberto Meléndez, Barranquilla
Attendance: 35,000
Referee: Carlos Pimentel (Brazil)

10 September 1997
21:10 UTC−3

Paraguay	2–1	Bolivia
Benítez 26'; Gamarra 37'		Suárez 58'

Estadio Defensores del Chaco, Asunción
Attendance: 40,341
Referee: Benito Archundia (Mexico)

=== Matchday 17 ===
12 October 1997
18:15 UTC−3

Argentina	0–0	Uruguay

Estadio Monumental Antonio Vespucio Liberti, Buenos Aires
Attendance: 52,000
Referee: Claudio Vinicius Cerdeira (Brazil)

12 October 1997
21:15 UTC−3

Chile	4–0	Peru
Salas 13', 82', 88'; Reyes 58'

Estadio Nacional, Santiago
Attendance: 74,219
Referee: Márcio Rezende de Freitas (Brazil)

12 October 1997
19:10 UTC−3

Paraguay	1–0	Venezuela
Torres 68'

Estadio Defensores del Chaco, Asunción
Attendance: 35,000
Referee: Esfandiar Baharmast (USA)

12 October 1997
16:00 UTC−5

Ecuador	1–0	Bolivia
Graziani 27'

Estadio Monumental Isidro Romero Carbo, Guayaquil
Attendance: 14,568
Referee: Arturo Brizio Carter (Mexico)

=== Matchday 18 ===
16 November 1997
19:30 UTC−3

Argentina	1–1	Colombia
Cáceres 69'		Valderrama 20'

Estadio La Bombonera, Buenos Aires
Attendance: 40,000
Referee: Márcio Rezende de Freitas (Brazil)

16 November 1997
17:00 UTC−3

Uruguay	5–3	Ecuador
Saralegui 3', 12'; Abreu 48', 52'; Aguilera 63'		Graziani 2', 59', 68'

Estadio Domingo Burgueño, Maldonado
Attendance: 4,000
Referee: Antonio Marrufo Mendoza (Mexico)

16 November 1997
15:00 UTC−5

Peru	1–0	Paraguay
Soto 37'

Estadio Nacional, Lima
Attendance: 30,000
Referee: Francisco Mourao Dacildo (Brazil)

16 November 1997
17:00 UTC−3

Chile	3–0	Bolivia
Barrera 23'; Salas 40'; Carreño 84'

Estadio Nacional, Santiago
Attendance: 74,777
Referee: Wilson de Souza Mendonça (Brazil)

== Qualified teams ==
The following five teams from CONMEBOL qualified for the final tournament.

Team	Qualified as	Qualified on	Previous appearances in FIFA World Cup^{1}
Brazil	Defending champions	17 July 1994	15 (all) (1930, 1934, 1938, 1950, 1954, **1958**, **1962**, 1966, **1970**, 1974, 1978, 1982, 1986, 1990, **1994**)
Argentina	Winners	10 September 1997	11 (1930, 1934, 1958, 1962, 1966, 1974, **1978**, 1982, **1986**, 1990, 1994)
Paraguay	Runners-up	10 September 1997	4 (1930, 1950, 1958, 1986)
Colombia	Third place	10 September 1997	3 (1962, 1990, 1994)
Chile	Fourth place	16 November 1997	6 (1930, 1950, 1962, 1966, 1974, 1982)

^{1} Bold indicates champions for that year. Italic indicates hosts for that year.

== Goalscorers ==
There were 184 goals scored in 72 matches, for an average of 2.56 goals per match.

12 goals

- (Chile) Iván Zamorano

11 goals

- (Chile) Marcelo Salas

7 goals

- (Colombia) Faustino Asprilla

6 goals

- (Ecuador) Álex Aguinaga
- (Ecuador) Ariel Graziani
- (Peru) Roberto Palacios

4 goals

- (Argentina) Ariel Ortega

3 goals

- (Argentina) Gabriel Batistuta
- (Argentina) Hernán Crespo
- (Bolivia) Marco Etcheverry
- (Bolivia) Marco Sandy
- (Colombia) Antony de Ávila
- (Colombia) Carlos Valderrama
- (Ecuador) Eduardo Hurtado
- (Paraguay) Miguel Ángel Benítez
- (Paraguay) Carlos Gamarra
- (Paraguay) Arístides Rojas
- (Uruguay) Marcelo Otero

2 goals

- (Argentina) Marcelo Gallardo
- (Argentina) Claudio López
- (Argentina) Diego Simeone
- (Bolivia) Julio Baldivieso
- (Bolivia) Jaime Moreno
- (Bolivia) Berthy Suárez
- (Chile) Javier Margas
- (Chile) Pedro Reyes
- (Colombia) Jorge Bermúdez
- (Colombia) Hamilton Ricard
- (Colombia) Mauricio Serna
- (Ecuador) Agustín Delgado
- (Paraguay) Derlis Soto
- (Paraguay) Catalino Rivarola
- (Peru) Germán Carty
- (Peru) Juan Reynoso
- (Peru) Julinho
- (Peru) Flavio Maestri
- (Peru) José Pereda
- (Peru) Jorge Soto
- (Uruguay) Sebastián Abreu
- (Uruguay) Paolo Montero
- (Uruguay) Marcelo Saralegui
- (Uruguay) Darío Silva
- (Venezuela) Giovanni Savarese

1 goal

- (Argentina) José Albornoz
- (Argentina) Fernando Cáceres
- (Argentina) Néstor Gorosito
- (Argentina) Hugo Morales
- (Argentina) Pablo Paz
- (Argentina) Juan Pablo Sorín
- (Argentina) Juan Sebastián Verón
- (Bolivia) Ramiro Castillo
- (Bolivia) Milton Coimbra
- (Bolivia) Luis Cristaldo
- (Bolivia) Fernando Ochoaizpur
- (Bolivia) Roly Paniagua
- (Bolivia) Vladimir Soria
- (Chile) Rodrigo Barrera
- (Chile) Juan Carreño López
- (Chile) Fernando Cornejo
- (Chile) Fabián Estay
- (Chile) Pedro González Vera
- (Colombia) Víctor Aristizábal
- (Colombia) Wilmer Cabrera
- (Colombia) Freddy Rincón
- (Colombia) Iván Valenciano
- (Ecuador) Cléber Chalá
- (Ecuador) José Gavica
- (Ecuador) Iván Hurtado
- (Ecuador) Alberto Montaño
- (Ecuador) Máximo Tenorio
- (Paraguay) Roberto Acuña
- (Paraguay) Francisco Arce
- (Paraguay) Richard Báez
- (Paraguay) Hugo Brizuela
- (Paraguay) José Cardozo
- (Paraguay) José Luis Chilavert
- (Paraguay) Julio César Enciso
- (Paraguay) Félix Ricardo Torres
- (Peru) Manuel Marengo
- (Uruguay) Carlos Aguilera
- (Uruguay) Pablo Bengoechea
- (Uruguay) Gabriel Cedrés
- (Uruguay) Gustavo Poyet
- (Uruguay) Álvaro Recoba
- (Uruguay) Gonzalo de los Santos
- (Venezuela) Rafael Castellín
- (Venezuela) Gerson Díaz
- (Venezuela) Rafael Dudamel
- (Venezuela) Dioni Guerra
- (Venezuela) Gabriel Miranda
- (Venezuela) Edson Tortolero

1 own goal

- (Bolivia) Juan Manuel Peña (against Uruguay)
