= Adolfo Esteche =

Paraguayan footballer (born 1972)

Personal information
- Full name: Adolfo Esteche Sosa
- Date of birth: 6 July 1972 (age 54)
- Place of birth: Luque, Paraguay
- Height: 1.67 m (5 ft 6 in)
- Position: Midfielder

Youth career
- Peñón FBC
- Sportivo Luqueño

Senior career*
Years	Team	Apps	(Gls)
1992–1996	Sportivo Luqueño		
1996	Acapulco		
1996–1998	Sportivo Luqueño		
1998	Olimpia		
1999	Santiago Morning	6	(0)
2000	Sol de América		
2000	Sportivo Luqueño		
2001	Olimpia		
2002	Deportivo Recoleta		
2002–2004	Sportivo Luqueño		
2004	Peñón FBC	–	(–)
- * Club domestic league appearances and goals

Adolfo Esteche Sosa (born July 6, 1972) is a retired Paraguayan footballer who played for clubs of Paraguay, Mexico and Chile.

== Teams ==
- (Paraguay) Peñón FBC (youth)
- (Paraguay) Sportivo Luqueño 1992–1996
- (Mexico) Guerreros Acapulco 1996
- (Paraguay) Sportivo Luqueño 1996–1998
- (Paraguay) Olimpia 1998
- (Chile) Santiago Morning 1999
- (Paraguay) Sol de América 2000
- (Paraguay) Sportivo Luqueño 2000
- (Paraguay) Olimpia 2001
- (Paraguay) Deportivo Recoleta 2002
- (Paraguay) Sportivo Luqueño 2002–2004
- (Paraguay) Peñón FBC 2004

== Personal life ==
Adolfo is the older brother of the footballer Francisco Esteche, with whom he coincided in Peñón FBC, Sportivo Luqueño and Olimpia.

== Honours ==
Olimpia

- Paraguayan Primera División: 1998
