= José Albornoz =

Argentine footballer (born 1970)

Personal information
- Full name: José Fabián Albornoz
- Date of birth: 19 July 1970 (age 56)
- Place of birth: Buenos Aires, Argentina
- Height: 1.76 m (5 ft 9 1/2 in)
- Position: Midfielder

Senior career*
Years	Team	Apps	(Gls)
1989–1990	Talleres de Córdoba	0	(0)
1990	San Lorenzo	0	(0)
1990–1993	Deportivo Español	67	(11)
1993–1995	River Plate	14	(0)
1995	Racing	17	(4)
1995–1996	Gimnasia	30	(9)
1996–1997	Independiente	22	(1)
1997–1998	Newell's Old Boys	10	(0)
1998–1999	Independiente	4	(0)
2000	Unión Tarija	8	(1)
2000–2002	Gimnasia	16	(0)
2002–2003	Olimpo	2	(0)
2003–2004	Belgrano	9	(0)
Total		199	(26)

International career
1994	Argentina U23		
1996	Argentina	3	(1)
- * Club domestic league appearances and goals

José Fabián Albornoz (born 19 July 1970) is an Argentine former footballer who played as a midfielder.

== Career ==
Born in Buenos Aires, Albornoz played for Talleres de Córdoba, San Lorenzo, Deportivo Español, River Plate, Racing, Gimnasia, Independiente, Newell's Old Boys, Unión Tarija, Olimpo and Belgrano.

He also earned three caps for Argentina in 1996, scoring one goal. He also played for Argentina U23 in February 1994, called to the only edition of Copa de las Américas Sub-23.

== Career statistics ==
=== International ===
Appearances and goals by national team and year
National team	Year	Apps	Goals
Argentina	1996	3	1
Total		3	1

Scores and results list Argentina's goal tally first, score column indicates score after each Albornoz goal.

List of international goals scored by José Albornoz
No.	Date	Venue	Opponent	Score	Result	Competition	Ref.
1	9 October 1996	Estadio Polideportivo de Pueblo Nuevo, San Cristóbal, Venezuela	Venezuela	5–2	5–2	1998 FIFA World Cup qualification	
