= Hugo Morales (footballer) =

Argentine footballer

Personal information
- Full name: Hugo Alberto Morales
- Date of birth: 30 July 1974 (age 52)
- Place of birth: Buenos Aires, Argentina
- Height: 1.74 m (5 ft 8 1/2 in)
- Position: Midfielder

Senior career*
Years	Team	Apps	(Gls)
1991–1995	Huracán	162	(23)
1995–1999	Lanús	126	(17)
1999–2002	Tenerife	91	(7)
2003	Lanús	8	(2)
2003–2004	Independiente	16	(2)
2004–2005	Atlético Nacional	39	(5)
2006	Millonarios	10	(3)
2007	Universidad Católica	14	(2)
2008	Talleres	0	(0)

International career
1991	Argentina U20	2	(0)
1995–1996	Argentina	9	(2)
1996	Argentina Olympic	4	(0)
- * Club domestic league appearances and goals

Olympic medal record

Men's football
Silver medal – second place	1996 Atlanta	Team

Hugo Alberto Morales (born 30 July 1974 in Buenos Aires) is an Argentine retired footballer who played as a midfielder.

== Teams ==
- (Argentina) Huracán 1991–1995
- (Argentina) Lanús 1995–1999
- (Spain) Tenerife 1999–2002
- (Argentina) Lanús 2003
- (Argentina) Independiente 2003–2004
- (Colombia) Atlético Nacional 2004–2005
- (Colombia) Millonarios 2006
- (Chile) Universidad Católica 2007
- (Argentina) Talleres 2008

== Career statistics ==
=== International ===
Scores and results list Argentina's goal tally first, score column indicates score after each Morales goal.

List of international goals scored by Hugo Morales
No.	Date	Venue	Opponent	Score	Result	Competition
1	9 October 1996	Estadio Polideportivo de Pueblo Nuevo, San Cristóbal, Venezuela	Venezuela	4–1	5–2	1998 FIFA World Cup qualification
2	28 December 1996	Estadio José María Minella, Mar de Plata, Argentina	FR Yugoslavia	2–2	2–3	Friendly
