= Isidro Sandoval =

Paraguayan footballer (born 1959)

Personal information
- Full name: Isidro Sandoval
- Date of birth: 15 May 1959 (age 67)
- Place of birth: Lambaré, Paraguay
- Height: 1.85 m (6 ft 1 in)
- Positions: Sweeper; centre back

Senior career*
Years	Team	Apps	(Gls)
1977–1980	Guaraní		
1981-1982	Cerro Porteño		
1982–1987	Guaraní		
1987–1989	Vélez Sarsfield		
1989	Guaraní		
1990–1992	Sport Colombia		
1992–1995	Tacuary		

International career
1985–1986	Paraguay	11	(1)
- * Club domestic league appearances and goals

Isidro Sandoval (born 15 May 1959) is a Paraguayan former footballer who played as a sweeper and centre back.

== Honours ==
=== Club ===
- Guaraní
  - Paraguayan Primera División: 1984
