= Tomás González (Paraguayan footballer) =

Paraguayan footballer (born 1977)

Personal information
- Full name: Tomás Alberto González Vera
- Date of birth: 21 December 1977 (age 48)
- Place of birth: Asunción, Paraguay
- Height: 1.76 m (5 ft 9 in)
- Position: Midfielder

Senior career*
Years	Team	Apps	(Gls)
1997–1999	Cerro Corá		
1999–2000	Rangers	23	(6)
2001–2002	Olimpia	24	(0)
2003–2004	12 de Octubre	16	(1)
2005	Sportivo Luqueño	5	(0)
2005	General Caballero ZC	17	(2)
2006–2008	Silvio Pettirossi	28	(2)
2009	Alianza Atlético	0	(0)
2009	2 de Mayo	22	(5)
2009	Cobreloa	7	(0)
2010	Sportivo Luqueño	13	(1)
2012	General Caballero ZC		

International career
1997	Paraguay U20	3	(0)
1998–2000	Paraguay	11	(2)
- * Club domestic league appearances and goals

Tomás Alberto González Vera (born 21 December 1977), is a Paraguayan former professional footballer who played as a midfielder.

== Career ==
Tomás González in Paraguay played in clubs as Club Cerro Corá, Club Olimpia, 12 de Octubre, Sportivo Luqueño, General Caballero ZC, Silvio Pettirossi and 2 de Mayo.

Abroad, González played in Chile for Rangers de Talca in 1999 and Cobreloa in 2009. He also had a brief stint with Peruvian club Alianza Atlético. With Cobreloa, he had eight matches of the eleven matches than the team has played in total and in the Copa Chile. González also has played one and the only match for the copa chile against Deportes Antofagasta they lost 2–1 on that occasion that meant that despite it lost a classic also was eliminated of the cup.
