= Rafael Castellín =

Venezuelan footballer (born 1975)

Personal information
- Full name: Rafael Ernesto Castellín García
- Date of birth: 2 September 1975 (age 51)
- Place of birth: Maturín, Venezuela
- Height: 1.79 m (5 ft 10 in)
- Position: Striker

Team information
- Current team: Monagas (assistant)

Youth career
- Monagas

Senior career*
Years	Team	Apps	(Gls)
1992–1996	Monagas		(18)
1996	Minervén		(6)
1996–1999	Caracas	75	(41)
1999–2002	Deportivo Italchacao	61	(23)
2002–2003	Monagas		(7)
2003–2005	Caracas	43	(28)
2005–2006	Maracaibo	7	(2)
2006–2010	Caracas	96	(42)
2010–2011	Real Esppor	35	(10)
2011–2013	Deportivo Lara	59	(27)
2014–2015	Monagas		

International career
1996–2005	Venezuela	22	(5)

Managerial career
- 2016: Angostura (assistant)
- 2018–2019: Monagas (assistant)
- 2020: Zamora (assistant)
- 2021–2022: Atlético La Cruz (youth)
- 2023: Monagas (reserves)
- 2024–: Monagas (assistant)
- * Club domestic league appearances and goals

Rafael Ernesto Castellín García (born 2 September 1975) is a Venezuelan football manager and former player who played as a striker. He is the current assistant manager of Monagas.

== International career ==
Castellín made 22 appearances for the senior Venezuela national football team.

=== International goals ===
No.	Date	Venue	Opponent	Score	Result	Competition	Ref.
1.	September 18, 1996	Cuscatlán, San Salvador, El Salvador	El Salvador	0–1	0-1	Friendly	
2.	April 2, 1997	Centenario, Montevideo, Uruguay	Uruguay	2–1	3-1	1998 FIFA World Cup qualification	
3.	May 31, 2000	Pueblo Nuevo, San Cristóbal, Venezuela	Panama	1–0	3-1	Friendly	
4.	May 31, 2000	Pueblo Nuevo, San Cristóbal, Venezuela	Panama	2–1	3-1	Friendly	
5.	August 18, 2004	Estadio de Gran Canaria, Las Palmas, Spain	Spain	3–2	3-2	Friendly	
