= Dioni Guerra =

Venezuelan footballer (born 1971)

Dioni José Guerra Ford (born September 27, 1971, in Puerto La Cruz, Venezuela) is a former Venezuelan footballer who played for clubs of Venezuela and in Deportes Concepción in Chile.

== Teams ==
- (Venezuela) Deportivo Anzoátegui 1991–1992
- (Venezuela) Carabobo 1993–1994
- (Venezuela) Minervén 1994–1995
- (Chile) Deportes Concepción 1996–1997
- (Venezuela) Deportivo Chacao 1997–1998
- (Venezuela) Deportivo Táchira 1998
- (Venezuela) Deportivo Italchacao 1999–2000
- (Venezuela) Trujillanos FC 2000–2002
- (Venezuela) Caracas FC 2002–2004
- (Venezuela) UA Maracaibo 2004–2006
- (Venezuela) Aragua 2006
- (Venezuela) Deportivo Italia 2007
- (Venezuela) PVDSA Gas 2007
