= Félix Brítez Román =

Paraguayan footballer (born 1967)

Personal information
- Date of birth: 24 March 1967 (age 59)
- Place of birth: Asunción, Paraguay
- Height: 1.80 m (5 ft 11 in)
- Position: Forward

Senior career*
Years	Team	Apps	(Gls)
1985-1992	Cerro Porteño		
1987	→ Internacional (loan)		
1992	Guaraní		
1993	Libertad		
1993	Club Sol de América		
1994-1995	Everton		
1996-1998	Cerro Porteño		
1999	Deportivo Pesquero		
2000	Atlético Colegiales Asunción		

International career
1988-1997	Paraguay MNT	14	(4)
- * Club domestic league appearances and goals

Félix Brítez Román (born 24 March 1967 in Asunción, Paraguay) is a Paraguayan former footballer who played as a forward for clubs of Paraguay, Brazil and Chile. He was part of the Paraguay national team for the Copa America 1989.

== Teams ==
- Cerro Porteño 1985–1987
- Internacional 1987
- Cerro Porteño 1988–1993
- Everton 1994–1995
- Cerro Porteño 1996–1998
- Deportivo Pesquero 1999

== Honours ==
Cerro Porteño

- Paraguayan Primera División 1990, 1992 and 1996
- Paraguayan Primera División Torneo Apertura: 1996 and 1998
- Paraguayan Primera División Torneo Clausura: 1997
