= Gabriel Miranda =

Uruguayan-Venezuelan footballer (born 1968)

Personal information
- Full name: Gabriel Antonio Miranda
- Date of birth: August 20, 1968 (age 58)
- Place of birth: Montevideo, Uruguay
- Height: 1.69 m (5 ft 6 1/2 in)
- Position: Midfielder

Senior career*
Years	Team	Apps	(Gls)
1986–1989	Caracas FC		
1989–1990	Deportivo Italia		
1990–1995	Caracas FC		
1995–1996	Atlante	21	(4)
1996	Emelec		
1996–1997	Caracas FC		
1997	Platense	1	(0)
1998–1999	UA Táchira		
1999–2000	Caracas FC		

International career
1994–1997	Venezuela	17	(3)
- * Club domestic league appearances and goals as of May 2009

Gabriel ("Gaby") Antonio Miranda (born 20 August 1968 in Montevideo) is a Uruguayan - Venezuelan football midfielder who made a total number of seventeen appearances (three goals) for the Venezuela national team between 1994 and 1997.

== Club career ==
He started his professional career at Caracas FC, and also played in Argentina, Ecuador and Mexico.

== Career statistics ==
=== International ===
Appearances and goals by national team and year
National team	Year	Apps	Goals
Venezuela	1994	1	0
Venezuela	1995	5	1
Venezuela	1996	5	1
Venezuela	1997	6	1
Total		17	3

Scores and results list Venezuela's goal tally first, score column indicates score after each Miranda goal.

List of international goals scored by Gabriel Miranda
No.	Date	Venue	Opponent	Score	Result	Competition
1	12 July 1995	Estadio Domingo Burgueño, Maldonado, Uruguay	Paraguay	1–0	2–3	1995 Copa América
2	21 July 1996	Rommel Fernández Stadium, Panama City, Panama	Panama	1–0	2–0	Friendly
3	6 July 1997	Estadio Jose Pachencho Romero, Maracaibo, Venezuela	Ecuador	1–1	1–1	1998 FIFA World Cup qualification
