= Aldo Florentín =

Paraguayan footballer (born 1957)

Aldo Andrés Florentín Britez
Personal information
- Full name: Aldo Andrés Florentín
- Date of birth: 10 November 1957 (age 68)
- Place of birth: Caazapá, Paraguay
- Height: 1.77 m (5 ft 10 in)
- Position: Attacking midfielder

Senior career*
Years	Team	Apps	(Gls)
1975–1983	Cerro Porteño		
1984-1987	Sol de América		
1988-1989	Libertad		
1990-1991	Sol de América		
1992	Cerro Porteño		

International career
1979-1983	Paraguay	31	(4)
- * Club domestic league appearances and goals

Aldo Andrés Florentín Britez (born 10 November 1957) is a Paraguayan former football attacking midfielder born in Caazapá.

== Honours ==
- Cerro Porteño
  - Paraguayan Primera División: 1977, 1992
- Sol de América
  - Paraguayan Primera División: 1986, 1991

== Titles ==
Season	Team	Title
1979	Paraguay	Copa América
