= Justo Jacquet =

Paraguayan footballer (born 1961)

Personal information
- Full name: Justo Pastor Jacquet Muñoz
- Date of birth: 9 September 1961 (age 65)
- Place of birth: San Ignacio, Paraguay
- Height: 1.87 m (6 ft 2 in)
- Position: Left-back

Senior career*
Years	Team	Apps	(Gls)
1981–1988	Cerro Porteño		
1989	Internacional	10	(0)
1990	Cerro Porteño	24	(4)
1991–1992	Belgrano de Córdoba	6	(0)
1992	Cerro Porteño		
1993	Sport Boys		
1994	3 de Febrero		
1994–1995	Presidente Hayes		

International career
1983–1991	Paraguay	40	(1)
- * Club domestic league appearances and goals

Justo Pastor Jacquet Muñoz (born 9 September 1961 in San Ignacio) is a Paraguayan former professional footballer who played as a left-back. He played professional football for Cerro Porteño in Paraguay and also had spells in Argentina, Brazil and Peru.

== International career ==
Jacquet made his international debut for the Paraguay national team on 2 June 1983 in a friendly match against Uruguay (0–0). He obtained a total number of 40 international caps, scoring one goal for the national side. Jacquet represented his native country at four Copa América's: 1983, 1987, 1989 and 1991.
