= Derlis Soto =

Paraguayan footballer (born 1973)

Personal information
- Full name: Derlis Francisco Soto
- Date of birth: 4 March 1973 (age 53)
- Place of birth: Caaguazú, Paraguay
- Height: 1.68 m (5 ft 6 in)
- Position: Striker

Senior career*
Years	Team	Apps	(Gls)
1993–1996	Guaraní		
1996–1998	Elche	9	(0)
1998–1999	Guaraní	37	(5)
1999–2002	Huracán	53	(11)
2002–2005	Libertad	96	(21)
2006	Guaraní	33	(5)
2007	12 de Octubre	21	(2)
2007	Coquimbo Unido	17	(0)
2008	9 de Julio		
2008	12 de Octubre	8	(0)
2009–2010	Crucero del Norte		
2010	Deportivo Caaguazú		
2011	Crucero del Norte		

International career
1997–2003	Paraguay	14	(1)
- * Club domestic league appearances and goals

Derlis Francisco Soto (born 4 March 1973) is a Paraguayan former international footballer who played as a striker.

== Career ==
Soto has played club football in Paraguay, Spain, and Argentina for Guaraní, Elche, Huracán, Libertad, 12 de Octubre, Coquimbo Unido, 9 de Julio, Crucero del Norte and Deportivo Caaguazú.

He also earned 14 caps for Paraguay between 1997 and 2003.
