= Francisco Esteche =

Paraguayan footballer (born 1973)

Personal information
- Full name: Francisco Javier Esteche Sosa
- Date of birth: 11 December 1973 (age 52)
- Place of birth: Luque, Paraguay
- Height: 1.76 m (5 ft 9 in)
- Position: Central midfielder

Team information
- Current team: General Caballero ZC
- Number: 8

Youth career
- 1990–1991: Sportivo Luqueño

Senior career*
Years	Team	Apps	(Gls)
1991–1994	Sportivo Luqueño	73	(10)
1995–2005	Olimpia	305	(75)
2006	Guaraní	23	(1)
2007	Macará	15	(1)
2007–2008	12 de Octubre	26	(3)
2009	Jorge Wilstermann	14	(1)
2009–2011	Sportivo Luqueño	57	(7)
2011–	General Caballero ZC	51	(5)

International career^{‡}
1995–2003	Paraguay	22	(2)
- * Club domestic league appearances and goals as of 6 December 2010 ‡ National team caps and goals as of December 2010

Francisco Javier Esteche Sosa (Note: In this Spanish name, the first or paternal surname is Esteche and the second or maternal family name is Sosa.) (born 12 November 1973), known as Francisco Esteche, is a Paraguayan footballer currently playing for General Caballero of the Primera División in Paraguay.

== Teams ==
- Sportivo Luqueño 1991–1994
- Olimpia 1995–2005
- Guaraní 2006
- Macará 2007
- 12 de Octubre 2007–2008
- Jorge Wilstermann 2009
- Sportivo Luqueño 2009–2011
- General Caballero 2011–present

== Personal life ==
Francisco is the younger brother of the footballer Adolfo Esteche, with whom he coincided in Peñón FBC, Sportivo Luqueño and Olimpia..

== Career statistics ==
=== International goals ===
#	Date	Venue	Opponent	Score	Result	Competition
1.	14 May 1995	Estadio Félix Capriles, Cochabamba, Bolivia	Bolivia	1–1	Draw	Copa Paz del Chaco
2.	7 February 1996	Estadio Defensores del Chaco, Asunción, Paraguay	Armenia	2–0	Win	Friendly
Correct as of 7 October 2015
