= Miguel Benítez (footballer) =

Paraguayan footballer (born 1997)

Personal information
- Full name: Miguel Ángel Benítez Guayuan
- Date of birth: 13 August 1997 (age 28)
- Place of birth: Asunción, Paraguay
- Height: 1.72 m (5 ft 8 in)
- Position: Left-back

Miguel Ángel Benítez Guayuan (born 13 August 1997) is a Paraguayan footballer. He plays as a left-back for Club Cerro Porteño in the Paraguayan Primera División.

== Career ==
Trained in the youth ranks of Club Guaraní, Benítez made his first-team debut in the 2018 season.

His 2022 season was marked by a ligament rupture injury that sidelined him for most of the year.

In December 2023, Benítez signed with Club Cerro Porteño ahead of the 2024 season.

== Statistics ==
Updated to the last match played on 27 January 2023

Club	Div.	Season	League		Domestic Cups		International Cups		Total	
Club	Div.	Season	Matches	Goals	Matches	Goals	Matches	Goals	Matches	Goals
Club Guaraní Paraguay	1st Div.	2018	21	0	0	0	4	0	25	0
Club Guaraní Paraguay	1st Div.	2019	11	0	0	0	0	0	11	0
Club Guaraní Paraguay	1st Div.	2020	21	0	0	0	5	0	26	0
Club Guaraní Paraguay	1st Div.	2021	19	0	0	0	2	0	21	0
Club Guaraní Paraguay	1st Div.	2022	2	0	0	0	0	0	2	0
Club Guaraní Paraguay	1st Div.	2023	1	0	0	0	0	0	1	0
Club Guaraní Paraguay	Club total		75	0	0	0	11	0	86	0
Career total			75	0	0	0	11	0	86	0

== Honors ==
=== National Titles ===
Title	Club	Country	Year
Copa Paraguay	Club Guaraní	Paraguay	2018
