= Julio César Franco (footballer) =

Paraguayan footballer (born 1965)

Julio César Franco López (born October 1, 1965, in Asunción, Paraguay) is a Paraguayan former footballer who played as a midfielder for clubs in Paraguay, Spain, Argentina and Chile. He was also a member of the Paraguay national team that participated in Copa America 1989.

== Teams ==
- Guaraní 1984-1988
- Cádiz 1988-1989
- Guaraní 1989-1991
- Deportivo Mandiyú 1992-1993
- Guaraní 1993
- Deportes Iquique 1994-1995
- Guaraní 1996-1997
- Silvio Pettirossi 1998
- Independiente 1998-1999
- Silvio Pettirossi 2000
