= Eumelio Palacios =

Paraguayan footballer and coach (born 1964)

Personal information
- Full name: Eumelio Ramón Palacios Cristaldo
- Date of birth: 15 September 1964 (age 62)
- Place of birth: Asunción, Paraguay
- Height: 1.77 m (5 ft 10 in)
- Position: Striker

Senior career*
Years	Team	Apps	(Gls)
1982-1989	Libertad		
1990-1991	Cerro Porteño		
1992-1993	Deportivo Pereira		
1993	Deportivo Cali		
1994–1995	Cerro Cora		
1995	Atlético Huila		
1995	Estudiantes L.P.		
1996	Atlético Huila		
1997	Guarani		
1997-2000	Cerro Cora		
2001	Atlético Colegiales		

International career
1987-1989	Paraguay	32	(4)
- * Club domestic league appearances and goals

Eumelio Ramón Palacios Cristaldo (born 15 September 1964 in Asunción, Paraguay) is a former striker and football coach.
