= Catalino Rivarola =

Paraguayan footballer (born 1965)

Personal information
- Full name: Catalino Rivarola Méndez
- Date of birth: 30 April 1965 (age 61)
- Place of birth: Zabalhos, Paraguay
- Height: 1.88 m (6 ft 2 in)
- Position: Defender

Senior career*
Years	Team	Apps	(Gls)
1985–1991	Cerro Porteño		
1991–1995	Talleres	98	(3)
1995–1998	Grêmio	60	(1)
1999	Palmeiras	3	(0)
2000	América-RJ		
2001	Libertad		

International career
1988–1998	Paraguay	52	(3)
- * Club domestic league appearances and goals as of April 2008

Catalino Rivarola Méndez (born 30 April 1965 in Zabalhos, Asunción) is a former football defender from Paraguay.

== Club ==
Rivarola started his club career with Cerro Porteño in 1985 and was part of the team that won the 1987 championship. In 1991, he joined Talleres de Córdoba in Argentina.

In 1995, he moved to Brazil where he was part of the Grêmio team that won several titles including the Recopa Sudamericana in 1995, in 1999 he played for Palmeiras in the season that they won the Copa Libertadores. He spent 2000 with América-RJ before returning to Paraguay in 2001 to play for Libertad.

== International ==
Rivarola made his international debut for the Paraguay national football team on 7 September 1988 in a friendly match against Ecuador (5-1 win). He was capped 52 times and scored 3 goals for Paraguay in a national career which lasted from 1988 to 1998. Rivarola played at the 1998 FIFA World Cup and at the Copa América in 1989 and 1991.

== Honours ==
=== Club ===
- Cerro Porteño
  - Paraguayan Primera División: 1987
- Grêmio
  - Copa Libertadores: 1995
  - Campeonato Gaúcho: 1996
  - Campeonato Brasileiro: 1996
  - Recopa Sudamericana: 1996
  - Copa do Brasil: 1997
- Palmeiras
  - Copa Libertadores: 1999
