= Pedro Garay =

Paraguayan footballer (born 1961)

Personal information
- Full name: Pedro Garay Núñez
- Date of birth: 19 October 1961 (age 65)
- Place of birth: Puerto Rosario, Paraguay
- Height: 1.78 m (5 ft 10 in)
- Position: Right midfielder

Senior career*
Years	Team	Apps	(Gls)
1980–1986	Sol de América		
1986–1992	Cerro Porteño		
1992	Oriente Petrolero		
1993–1998	Sporting Cristal		
1998	Libertad		
1999	Deportivo Pesquero		

International career
1983–1985	Paraguay	6	(0)
- * Club domestic league appearances and goals

Pedro Garay Núñez (born 19 October 1961) is a Paraguayan former footballer who played as a right midfielder. He was also part of Paraguay's squad for the 1983 Copa América tournament.

== Honours ==
=== Club ===
Sol de América

- Paraguayan Primera División: 1986

Cerro Porteño

- Paraguayan Primera División: 1987, 1990, 1992
- Torneo República: 1991, 1995

Oriente Petrolero

- Copa Bolivia: 1992

Sporting Cristal

- Peruvian Primera División: 1994, 1995, 1996
