= Eladio Zárate =

Paraguayan footballer (1942–2026)

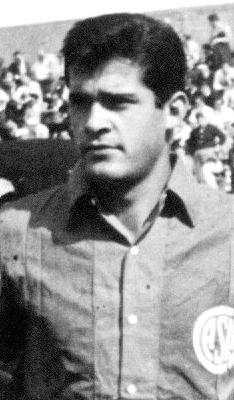
- Zárate with San Lorenzo in 1963

Personal information
- Full name: Eladio Zárate León
- Date of birth: 12 January 1942
- Place of birth: Alberdi, Paraguay
- Date of death: 3 May 2026 (aged 84)
- Place of death: Lambaré, Paraguay
- Position: Forward

Senior career*
Years	Team	Apps	(Gls)
1959–1962	General Caballero		
1962–1963	Olimpia		
1964	San Lorenzo	32	(5)
1965–1966	Huracán	40	(18)
1967–1970	Unión Española	145	(103)
1971	Universidad de Chile	32	(25)
1972	San Luis Potosí		
1973	Guaraní		

International career
1959–1963	Paraguay	8	(4)

Managerial career
- 1976: Coquimbo Unido
- 1984: Guaraní (assistant)
- Sportivo Ameliano
- * Club domestic league appearances and goals

Eladio Zárate León (14 January 1942 – 3 May 2026) was a Paraguayan professional footballer who played as a forward in clubs of Paraguay, Argentina and Chile and the Paraguay national team in the 1963 South American Championship.

== Playing career ==
- (Paraguay) General Caballero 1959–1962
- (Paraguay) Olimpia 1962–1963
- (Argentina) San Lorenzo 1964
- (Argentina) Huracán 1965–1966
- (Chile) Unión Española 1967–1970
- Universidad de Chile 1971
- (Mexico) San Luis Potosí 1972
- (Paraguay) Guaraní 1973

== Managerial career ==
Zárate began his career as manager in 1974. He coached Coquimbo Unido along with Enrique Hormazábal in 1976. He also served as the assistant of Cayetano Ré in Guaraní in the 1984 season, when they became the Paraguayan champions, among others.

As head coach, he led several teams in the Paraguayan second level and also regional teams until 2000.

== Personal life and death ==
Zárate married María Dolores López, a Chilean who played volleyball for Unión Española and is the niece of Juan Martínez, a former player of Rangers de Talca.

He was the uncle of the former Paraguay international footballer, Diego Gavilán.

His eldest son, who was with the Guaraní youth ranks, died of leukaemia, aged 17. His youngest son, Marcos, is a former footballer who played at minor categories of the Spanish football and trialled with Unión Española in 2003.

Zárate died on 3 May 2026, aged 84, in Lambaré, Paraguay.

== Honours ==
Olimpia

- Paraguayan Primera División: 1962

Individual

- Chilean Championship top scorer: 1967, 1968, 1969, 1971
