= Alejandro Miranda (footballer) =

Paraguayan footballer

Personal information
- Position: Midfielder

Senior career*
Years	Team	Apps	(Gls)
- Club Guaraní

International career
1923	Paraguay	1	(0)
- * Club domestic league appearances and goals

Alejandro Miranda was a Paraguayan footballer who played as a midfielder.

With Club Guaraní, Miranda won the Paraguayan Primera División championship twice, in 1921 and 1923. He represented Paraguay in the victorious Copa Chevallier Boutell tournament in 1923, playing in both matches against Argentina.

As a Club Guaraní player, he also took part in the 1923 South American Championship, where Paraguay finished third. Miranda made a single appearance, in the match against Argentina.

== Bibliography ==
- Tomasz Wołek, Encyklopedia piłkarska FUJI. Copa America, Wydawnictwo GiA, Katowice, 1995, ISBN 83-902751-2-0, p. 28.
