= Alfredo Vega =

Paraguayan footballer (born 1935)

Personal information
- Full name: Alfredo Vega
- Date of birth: February 2, 1935
- Place of birth: San Lorenzo, Paraguay
- Date of death: February 14, 2012 (aged 77)
- Place of death: San Lorenzo, Paraguay
- Position: Midfielder

Senior career*
Years	Team	Apps	(Gls)
1949–1957	Libertad		
1958–1959	Santos		
1960	Santiago Morning		
1960–1961	Cerro Porteño		
1961–1967	Deportivo Pereira	254	(18)

International career
1955–1957	Paraguay	5	(0)
- * Club domestic league appearances and goals

Alfredo "Chacho" Vega (February 2, 1935 – February 14, 2012) was a Paraguayan football midfielder who played for clubs of Paraguay, Brazil, Chile and Colombia.

== Teams ==
- (Paraguay) Libertad 1949–1957
- (Brazil) Santos 1958–1959
- (Chile) Santiago Morning 1960
- (Paraguay) Cerro Porteño 1960–1961
- (Colombia) Deportivo Pereira 1961–1967

== Honours ==
Libertad

- Paraguayan Primera División (1): 1955

Cerro Porteño

- Paraguayan Primera División (1): 1961
