= 1989 Paraguayan Primera División season =

Paraguayan football season

Paraguayan Primera División
- Season: 1989
- Champions: Olimpia
- Relegated: General Caballero
- Copa Libertadores: Olimpia

The 1989 season of the Paraguayan Primera División, the top category of Paraguayan football, was played by 12 teams.

Defending champions Olimpia successfully retained their title, finishing six points ahead of runners-up Guaraní.

== Standings ==
| Pos | Team | Pld | W | D | L | GF | GA | GD | Pts | Qualification or relegation |
|---|---|---|---|---|---|---|---|---|---|---|
| 1 | Olimpia (C) | 33 | 19 | 12 | 2 | 74 | 35 | +39 | 50 | Qualification for Copa Libertadores group stage |
| 2 | Guaraní | 33 | 17 | 10 | 6 | 56 | 28 | +28 | 44 | |
| 3 | Cerro Porteño | 33 | 16 | 8 | 9 | 52 | 33 | +19 | 40 | |
| 4 | Colegiales | 33 | 9 | 18 | 6 | 51 | 49 | +2 | 36 | |
| 5 | Sportivo Luqueño | 33 | 11 | 13 | 9 | 45 | 45 | 0 | 35 | |
| 6 | Libertad | 33 | 10 | 14 | 9 | 49 | 45 | +4 | 34 | |
| 7 | Sol de América | 33 | 10 | 11 | 12 | 48 | 46 | +2 | 31 | |
| 8 | River Plate | 33 | 7 | 15 | 11 | 27 | 36 | −9 | 29 | |
| 9 | San Lorenzo | 33 | 9 | 10 | 14 | 42 | 49 | −7 | 28 | |
| 10 | Tembetary | 33 | 6 | 13 | 14 | 34 | 48 | −14 | 25 | |
| 11 | Sport Colombia | 33 | 5 | 15 | 13 | 36 | 53 | −17 | 25 | |
| 12 | General Caballero (R) | 33 | 5 | 9 | 19 | 38 | 69 | −31 | 19 | Relegaion to Primera División B |

Source: RSSSF
(C) Champions; (R) Relegated
