= 1988 Paraguayan Primera División season =

Paraguayan football season

The 1988 season of the Paraguayan Primera División, the top category of Paraguayan football, was played by 12 teams. The national champions were Olimpia.

== Results ==
=== First stage ===
Pos	Team	Pld	W	D	L	GF	GA	GD	Pts
1	Sol de América	11	6	4	1	14	3	+11	16
2	Cerro Porteño	11	6	2	3	16	10	+6	14
3	Sportivo Luqueño	11	5	4	2	17	12	+5	14
4	Colegiales	11	6	2	3	19	15	+4	14
5	River Plate	11	5	4	2	17	14	+3	14
6	Libertad	11	5	2	4	15	13	+2	12
7	Olimpia	11	4	4	3	17	16	+1	12
8	Guaraní	11	3	3	5	15	14	+1	9
9	San Lorenzo	11	2	5	4	12	16	−4	9
10	General Caballero	11	3	2	6	13	17	−4	8
11	Sport Colombia	11	3	2	6	13	20	−7	8
12	Nacional	11	0	2	9	5	23	−18	2

- Bonus Points: Sol de América 2.5, Cerro Porteño 1.5, Sportivo Luqueño 0.5

=== Second stage ===
Pos	Team	Pld	W	D	L	GF	GA	GD	Pts
1	Olimpia	11	6	4	1	17	10	+7	16
2	Libertad	11	5	5	1	17	7	+10	15
3	Cerro Porteño	11	3	7	1	17	10	+7	13
4	Colegiales	11	3	6	2	19	14	+5	12
5	River Plate	11	4	4	3	13	12	+1	12
6	Sport Colombia	11	4	4	3	13	17	−4	12
7	Guaraní	11	3	5	3	15	12	+3	11
8	General Caballero	11	3	5	3	8	10	−2	11
9	San Lorenzo	11	3	3	5	7	9	−2	9
10	Sportivo Luqueño	11	2	4	5	6	13	−7	8
11	Nacional	11	3	1	7	8	18	−10	7
12	Sol de América	11	1	4	6	9	17	−8	6

- Bonus Points: Olimpia 2.5, Libertad 1.5, Cerro Porteño 0.5

=== Third stage ===
Pos	Team	Pld	W	D	L	GF	GA	GD	Pts
1	Olimpia	11	7	3	1	23	12	+11	17
2	Sol de América	11	7	3	1	13	6	+7	17
3	Cerro Porteño	11	8	1	2	12	6	+6	17
4	Sportivo Luqueño	11	4	6	1	14	11	+3	14
5	Colegiales	11	2	7	2	12	8	+4	11
6	Libertad	11	3	4	4	16	16	0	10
7	River Plate	11	3	4	4	10	10	0	10
8	Sport Colombia	11	4	2	5	16	14	+2	10
9	San Lorenzo	11	4	2	5	13	15	−2	10
10	Guaraní	11	3	3	5	12	9	+3	9
11	Nacional	11	1	2	8	10	24	−14	4
12	General Caballero	11	1	1	9	12	32	−20	3

- Bonus Points: Olimpia 2.5, Sol de América 1.5, Cerro Porteño 0.5

=== Final Stage ===
Pos	Team	Pld	W	D	L	GF	GA	GD	Pts
1	Olimpia	7	4	3	0	9	3	+6	16
2	Sol de América	7	1	5	1	3	4	−1	11
3	Libertad	7	2	4	1	11	10	+1	9.5
4	Cerro Porteño	7	2	3	2	11	7	+4	8.5
5	Sport Colombia	7	2	3	2	7	8	−1	7
6	River Plate	7	1	5	1	10	10	0	7
7	Sportivo Luqueño	7	1	3	3	4	6	−2	5.5
8	Colegiales	7	2	0	5	11	15	−4	4

==== Copa Libertadores play-off ====
Sol de América	5–0	Silvio Pettirossi

Sol de América	1–1	Silvio Pettirossi
