= 1985 Paraguayan Primera División season =

Paraguayan football season

The 1985 season of the Paraguayan Primera División, the top category of Paraguayan football, was played by 10 teams. The national champions were Olimpia.

== Results ==
=== First stage ===
Pos	Team	Pld	W	D	L	GF	GA	GD	Pts
1	Cerro Porteño	9	5	3	1	15	6	+9	13
2	Olimpia	9	3	6	0	10	2	+8	12
3	San Lorenzo	9	5	1	3	12	12	0	11
4	Colegiales	9	2	5	2	9	9	0	9
5	Sol de América	9	2	5	2	13	12	+1	9
6	Guaraní	9	2	5	2	13	13	0	9
7	Nacional	9	1	6	2	9	9	0	8
8	Sportivo Luqueño	9	3	2	4	8	16	−8	8
9	Libertad	9	2	2	5	5	10	−5	6
10	River Plate	9	1	3	5	9	14	−5	5

=== Second stage ===
Pos	Team	Pld	W	D	L	GF	GA	GD	Pts
1	Nacional	9	4	4	1	13	10	+3	12
2	Sol de América	9	4	3	2	10	10	0	11
3	Olimpia	9	3	5	1	12	7	+5	11
4	Guaraní	9	4	2	3	9	9	0	10
5	Libertad	9	2	6	1	10	10	0	10
6	Sportivo Luqueño	9	3	3	3	16	13	+3	9
7	River Plate	9	3	3	3	8	10	−2	9
8	Cerro Porteño	9	2	4	3	13	11	+2	8
9	San Lorenzo	9	1	4	4	8	13	−5	6
10	Colegiales	9	0	4	5	9	15	−6	4

=== Third stage ===
Pos	Team	Pld	W	D	L	GF	GA	GD	Pts
1	Cerro Porteño	9	6	3	0	11	5	+6	15
2	Olimpia	9	5	2	2	15	6	+9	12
3	Colegiales	9	6	0	3	16	10	+6	12
4	River Plate	9	6	0	3	9	11	−2	12
5	San Lorenzo	9	4	3	2	14	7	+7	11
6	Guaraní	9	5	1	3	11	10	+1	11
7	Libertad	9	1	4	4	8	11	−3	6
8	Sportivo Luqueño	9	2	1	6	7	15	−8	5
9	Nacional	9	1	2	6	8	15	−7	4
10	Sol de América	9	0	2	7	4	14	−10	2

=== Final Stage ===
Pos	Team	Pld	W	D	L	GF	GA	GD	Pts
1	Olimpia	5	4	1	0	8	2	+6	11
2	Nacional	5	2	2	1	5	4	+1	8
3	Sol de América	5	2	2	1	13	10	+3	7
4	Cerro Porteño	5	1	1	3	7	9	−2	7
5	Guaraní	5	2	2	1	14	9	+5	6
6	San Lorenzo	5	0	0	5	2	15	−13	0
