= Alcides Sosa =

Paraguayan footballer (1944–2026)

Personal information
- Full name: Alcides Sosa Ovelar
- Date of birth: 24 March 1944
- Date of death: 22 May 2026 (aged 82)
- Position: Defender

Senior career*
Years	Team	Apps	(Gls)
1965	Club Rubio Ñu		
1966	Club Libertad		
1966–1970	Club Guaraní		
1971–1979	Club Olimpia		
1979–1980	Deportivo Pereira		
1981	Club Guaraní		

International career
1968–1977	Paraguay	48	(3)
- * Club domestic league appearances and goals

Alcides Sosa Ovelar (24 March 1944 – 22 May 2026) was a Paraguayan footballer who played as a defender. He made 48 appearances for the Paraguay national team from 1968 to 1977 and was also part of Paraguay's squad for the 1975 Copa América tournament. Sosa died on 22 May 2026, at the age of 82.

== Honours ==
Club Guaraní

- Paraguayan Primera División: 1967, 1969

Club Olimpia

- Paraguayan Primera División: 1971, 1975, 1978, 1979
- Copa Libertadores: 1979
