= 1912 in Paraguayan football =

The following article presents a summary of the 1912 association football season in Paraguay.

== First Division ==
The Paraguayan first division championship was played for the "Copa El Diario", a trophy issued by the newspaper of the same name. Four teams participated in the tournament which was played in a two-round all-play-all system, being the team with the most points at the end of the two rounds the champion. Club Olimpia won its first championship in history. Guaraní and Mbiguá were given permission to not participate in the tournament without being relegated.

Position	Team	Points
1	Olimpia	9
2	Sol de América	8
3	Nacional	5
4	Presidente Hayes	2

Champion
Relegated

== Second Division ==
The Paraguayan second division tournament was not played in 1912. However, a new team was admitted to the first division the following year: the newly found club Cerro Porteño. They got promoted to the first division by winning a four-team promotion tournament in early 1913, played between Cerro Porteño, Club 10 de Agosto, El Porvenir and River Plate Asunción.

== Liga Centenario ==
This dissident league accepted two new teams in 1912: Libertad and Atlántida SC. The winner at the end of the season was River Plate Asunción, who defeated the reigning champions Bahía Blanca in the final.
