= 1991 Paraguayan Primera División season =

Paraguayan football season

The 1991 season of the Paraguayan Primera División, the top category of Paraguayan football, was played by 12 teams. The national champions were Sol de América.

== Results ==
=== First stage ===
Pos	Team	Pld	W	D	L	GF	GA	GD	Pts
1	Olimpia	0	0	0	0	0	0	0	0
2	Cerro Corá	0	0	0	0	0	0	0	0
3	Colegiales	0	0	0	0	0	0	0	0
4	Sportivo Luqueño	0	0	0	0	0	0	0	0
5	Cerro Porteño	0	0	0	0	0	0	0	0
6	Guaraní	0	0	0	0	0	0	0	0
7	Libertad	0	0	0	0	0	0	0	0
8	River Plate	0	0	0	0	0	0	0	0
9	Sol de América	0	0	0	0	0	0	0	0
10	San Lorenzo	0	0	0	0	0	0	0	0
11	Nacional	0	0	0	0	0	0	0	0
12	Sport Colombia	0	0	0	0	0	0	0	0

=== Second stage ===
Pos	Team	Pld	W	D	L	GF	GA	GD	Pts
1	Cerro Porteño	0	0	0	0	0	0	0	0
2	Olimpia	0	0	0	0	0	0	0	0
3	Colegiales	0	0	0	0	0	0	0	0
4	Sol de América	0	0	0	0	0	0	0	0
5	Nacional	0	0	0	0	0	0	0	0
6	Guaraní	0	0	0	0	0	0	0	0
7	San Lorenzo	0	0	0	0	0	0	0	0
8	Cerro Corá	0	0	0	0	0	0	0	0
9	Sportivo Luqueño	0	0	0	0	0	0	0	0
10	River Plate	0	0	0	0	0	0	0	0
11	Sport Colombia	0	0	0	0	0	0	0	0
12	Libertad	0	0	0	0	0	0	0	0

=== Quarterfinals ===
==== Group A ====
Pos	Team	Pld	W	D	L	GF	GA	GD	Pts
1	Cerro Porteño	0	0	0	0	0	0	0	0
2	Sol de América	0	0	0	0	0	0	0	0
3	Nacional	0	0	0	0	0	0	0	0
4	Sportivo Luqueño	0	0	0	0	0	0	0	0

==== Group B ====
Pos	Team	Pld	W	D	L	GF	GA	GD	Pts
1	Guaraní	0	0	0	0	0	0	0	0
2	Olimpia	0	0	0	0	0	0	0	0
3	Cerro Corá	0	0	0	0	0	0	0	0
4	Colegiales	0	0	0	0	0	0	0	0

==== Semifinal play-offs ====
Cerro Porteño	–	Olimpia

Sol de América	–	Guaraní

==== Final play-offs ====
Cerro Porteño	1–1	Sol de América

Sol de América	2–1	Cerro Porteño
