= 1951 Paraguayan Primera División season =

Paraguayan football season

The 1951 season of the Paraguayan Primera División, the top category of Paraguayan football, was played by 11 teams. The national champions were Sportivo Luqueño.

== Results ==
=== Standings ===
Pos	Team	Pld	W	D	L	GF	GA	GD	Pts
1	Sportivo Luqueño	0	0	0	0	0	0	0	0
2	Cerro Porteño	0	0	0	0	0	0	0	0
3	Nacional	0	0	0	0	0	0	0	0
4	Libertad	0	0	0	0	0	0	0	0
5	Guaraní	0	0	0	0	0	0	0	0
6	Olimpia	0	0	0	0	0	0	0	0
7	Presidente Hayes	0	0	0	0	0	0	0	0
8	Sol de América	0	0	0	0	0	0	0	0
9	River Plate	0	0	0	0	0	0	0	0
10	San Lorenzo	10	0	0	10	0	0	0	0
11	Sport Colombia	0	0	0	0	0	0	0	0
