= 1952 Paraguayan Primera División season =

Paraguayan football season

The 1952 season of the Paraguayan Primera División, the top category of Paraguayan football, was played by 11 teams. The national champions were Presidente Hayes.

== Results ==
=== Standings ===
| Pos | Team | Pld | W | D | L | GF | GA | GD | Pts |
|---|---|---|---|---|---|---|---|---|---|
| 1 | Presidente Hayes | 0 | 0 | 0 | 0 | 0 | 0 | 0 | 0 |
| 2 | Sol de América | 0 | 0 | 0 | 0 | 0 | 0 | 0 | 0 |
| 3 | Libertad | 0 | 0 | 0 | 0 | 0 | 0 | 0 | 0 |
| 4 | Nacional | 0 | 0 | 0 | 0 | 0 | 0 | 0 | 0 |
| 5 | Olimpia | 0 | 0 | 0 | 0 | 0 | 0 | 0 | 0 |
| 6 | Cerro Porteño | 0 | 0 | 0 | 0 | 0 | 0 | 0 | 0 |
| 7 | Sportivo Luqueño | 0 | 0 | 0 | 0 | 0 | 0 | 0 | 0 |
| 8 | River Plate | 0 | 0 | 0 | 0 | 0 | 0 | 0 | 0 |
| 9 | Atlántida | 0 | 0 | 0 | 0 | 0 | 0 | 0 | 0 |
| 10 | Guaraní | 0 | 0 | 0 | 0 | 0 | 0 | 0 | 0 |
| 11 | San Lorenzo | 10 | 0 | 0 | 10 | 0 | 0 | 0 | 0 |
