= 1930 Paraguayan Primera División season =

Paraguayan football season

The 1930 season of the Paraguayan Primera División, the top category of Paraguayan football, was played by 14 teams. The national champions were Libertad.

== Results ==
=== Standings ===
Pos	Team	Pld	W	D	L	GF	GA	GD	Pts
1	Libertad	0	0	0	0	0	0	0	0
2	River Plate	0	0	0	0	0	0	0	0
3	Olimpia	0	0	0	0	0	0	0	0
4	Sportivo Luqueño	0	0	0	0	0	0	0	0
5	Guaraní	0	0	0	0	0	0	0	0
6	Nacional	0	0	0	0	0	0	0	0
7	Atlántida	0	0	0	0	0	0	0	0
8	Sol de América	0	0	0	0	0	0	0	0
9	Cerro Porteño	0	0	0	0	0	0	0	0
10	General Caballero	0	0	0	0	0	0	0	0
11	C.A.L.T.	0	0	0	0	0	0	0	0
12	Presidente Hayes	0	0	0	0	0	0	0	0
13	Presidente Alvear	0	0	0	0	0	0	0	0
14	Universo	0	0	0	0	0	0	0	0
