= 1964 Paraguayan Primera División season =

Paraguayan football season

The 1964 season of the Paraguayan Primera División, the top category of Paraguayan football, was played by 10 teams. The national champions were Guaraní.

== Results ==
=== Standings ===
| Pos | Team | Pld | W | D | L | GF | GA | GD | Pts |
|---|---|---|---|---|---|---|---|---|---|
| 1 | Guaraní | 18 | 10 | 5 | 3 | 32 | 19 | +13 | 25 |
| 2 | Cerro Porteño | 18 | 9 | 4 | 5 | 23 | 15 | +8 | 22 |
| 3 | Nacional | 18 | 8 | 6 | 4 | 22 | 16 | +6 | 22 |
| 4 | San Lorenzo | 18 | 6 | 8 | 4 | 20 | 19 | +1 | 20 |
| 5 | Rubio Ñu | 18 | 6 | 5 | 7 | 24 | 24 | 0 | 17 |
| 6 | River Plate | 18 | 7 | 3 | 8 | 19 | 27 | −8 | 17 |
| 7 | Olimpia | 18 | 4 | 8 | 6 | 25 | 22 | +3 | 16 |
| 8 | Presidente Hayes | 18 | 4 | 8 | 6 | 19 | 25 | −6 | 16 |
| 9 | Libertad | 18 | 5 | 3 | 10 | 16 | 23 | −7 | 13 |
| 10 | Sol de América | 18 | 5 | 2 | 11 | 23 | 33 | −10 | 12 |

=== Promotion/relegation play-offs ===
| Sportivo Luqueño | 3 – 1 | Libertad |

| Libertad | 1 – 0 | Sportivo Luqueño |

| Libertad | 1 – 0 | Sportivo Luqueño |
