= 1986 Paraguayan Primera División season =

Paraguayan football season

The 1986 season of the Paraguayan Primera División, the top category of Paraguayan football, was played by 10 teams. The national champions were Sol de América.

== Results ==
=== First stage ===
Pos	Team	Pld	W	D	L	GF	GA	GD	Pts
1	Sol de América	9	5	2	2	15	7	+8	12
2	Guaraní	9	4	4	1	9	5	+4	12
3	Cerro Porteño	9	5	1	3	13	9	+4	11
4	Olimpia	9	4	2	3	12	7	+5	10
5	Colegiales	9	3	4	2	10	9	+1	10
6	Sportivo Luqueño	9	3	3	3	13	13	0	9
7	Libertad	9	2	3	4	9	11	−2	7
8	Nacional	9	2	3	4	12	17	−5	7
9	San Lorenzo	9	2	3	4	10	16	−6	7
10	Sport Colombia	9	1	3	5	7	16	−9	5

==== First-place play-off ====
Sol de América	3–3 (3–5p)	Guaraní

=== Second stage ===
Pos	Team	Pld	W	D	L	GF	GA	GD	Pts
1	Libertad	9	7	0	2	15	9	+6	14
2	Olimpia	9	5	2	2	10	4	+6	12
3	Guaraní	9	5	1	3	16	12	+4	11
4	Cerro Porteño	9	3	4	2	9	8	+1	10
5	Colegiales	9	3	4	2	9	9	0	10
6	Sport Colombia	9	3	3	3	9	9	0	9
7	Sol de América	9	3	2	4	12	13	−1	8
8	Sportivo Luqueño	9	2	3	4	10	11	−1	7
9	Nacional	9	2	2	5	7	12	−5	6
10	San Lorenzo	9	1	1	7	12	22	−10	3

=== Third stage ===
Pos	Team	Pld	W	D	L	GF	GA	GD	Pts
1	Sol de América	9	5	4	0	13	5	+8	14
2	Colegiales	9	4	5	0	17	9	+8	13
3	Cerro Porteño	9	4	3	2	14	6	+8	11
4	Sportivo Luqueño	9	4	3	2	11	10	+1	11
5	Guaraní	9	3	4	2	14	10	+4	10
6	Sport Colombia	9	1	6	2	8	8	0	8
7	Libertad	9	1	5	3	11	15	−4	7
8	Olimpia	9	1	4	4	6	12	−6	6
9	San Lorenzo	9	1	4	4	4	12	−8	6
10	Nacional	9	0	4	5	5	16	−11	4

=== Aggregate Table ===
Pos	Team	Pld	W	D	L	GF	GA	GD	Pts
1	Sol de América	27	13	8	6	40	25	+15	34
2	Colegiales	27	10	13	4	36	27	+9	33
3	Guaraní	27	12	9	6	39	27	+12	33
4	Cerro Porteño	27	12	8	7	36	23	+13	32
5	Libertad	27	10	8	9	35	35	0	28
6	Olimpia	27	10	8	9	28	23	+5	28
7	Sportivo Luqueño	27	9	9	9	34	34	0	27
8	Sport Colombia	27	5	12	10	24	33	−9	22
9	Nacional	27	4	9	14	24	25	−1	17
10	San Lorenzo	27	4	8	15	26	50	−24	16

=== Final Stage ===
- Teams started with the following "bonus" points: Sol de América with 3 bonus points, Guaraní and Libertad with 2 bonus points, and Olimpia and Atlético Colegiales with 1 bonus point.

Pos	Team	Pld	W	D	L	GF	GA	GD	Pts
1	Sol de América	5	2	2	1	9	6	+3	9
2	Olimpia	5	3	1	1	8	4	+4	8
3	Cerro Porteño	5	3	1	1	7	5	+2	7
4	Libertad	5	2	0	3	6	8	−2	6
5	Guaraní	5	1	1	3	2	6	−4	5
5	Colegiales	5	1	1	3	4	7	−3	4
