= 1909 Paraguayan Primera División season =

Paraguayan football season

The following article presents a summary of the 1909 football (soccer) season in Paraguay.

== Liga Paraguaya results ==
The championship was played for the "Copa El Diario", a trophy issued by the newspaper of the same name. Six teams participated in the tournament which was played in a two-round all-play-all system, being the team with the most points at the end of the two rounds the champion. Club Nacional won its first championship after defeating Libertad in a playoff game.

Pos	Team	Pld	W	D	L	GF	GA	GD	Pts
1	Nacional	10	6	3	1	0	0	0	15
2	Libertad	10	7	1	2	0	0	0	15
3	Olimpia	10	6	2	2	0	0	0	14
4	Atlántida	10	4	1	5	0	0	0	9
5	Mbiguá	10	2	2	6	0	0	0	6
6	Guarani	10	0	1	9	0	0	0	1

- Note: Since both Nacional and Libertad finished with the same number of points, a playoff game was played to decide to championship. The game was won 3-1 by Nacional.
