= 1910 Paraguayan Primera División season =

Paraguayan football season

The following article presents a summary of the 1910 football (soccer) season in Paraguay.

== First Division ==
The Paraguayan first division championship was played for the "Copa El Diario", a trophy issued by the newspaper of the same name. Six teams participated in the tournament which was played in a two-round all-play-all system, being the team with the most points at the end of the two rounds the champion. Club Libertad won its first championship after defeating Atlántida SC in a playoff game.

Pos	Team	Pld	W	D	L	GF	GA	GD	Pts
1	Libertad	0	0	0	0	0	0	0	0
2	Atlántida	0	0	0	0	0	0	0	0
3	Nacional	0	0	0	0	0	0	0	0
4	Olimpia	0	0	0	0	0	0	0	0
5	Mbiguá	0	0	0	0	0	0	0	0
6	Guarani	0	0	0	0	0	0	0	0
