= 1935 Paraguayan Primera División season =

Paraguayan football season

The 1935 season of the Paraguayan Primera División, the top category of Paraguayan football, was played by 10 teams. The national champions were Cerro Porteño.

== Results ==
=== Standings ===
Pos	Team	Pld	W	D	L	GF	GA	GD	Pts
1	Cerro Porteño	0	0	0	0	0	0	0	0
2	Sol de América	0	0	0	0	0	0	0	0
3	Libertad	0	0	0	0	0	0	0	0
4	Olimpia	0	0	0	0	0	0	0	0
5	Nacional	0	0	0	0	0	0	0	0
6	C.A.L.T.	0	0	0	0	0	0	0	0
7	Guaraní	0	0	0	0	0	0	0	0
8	Atlántida	0	0	0	0	0	0	0	0
9	Presidente Hayes	0	0	0	0	0	0	0	0
10	River Plate	0	0	0	0	0	0	0	0
