= Carlos Monín =

Paraguayan footballer (1939–2023)

Carlos Monnin
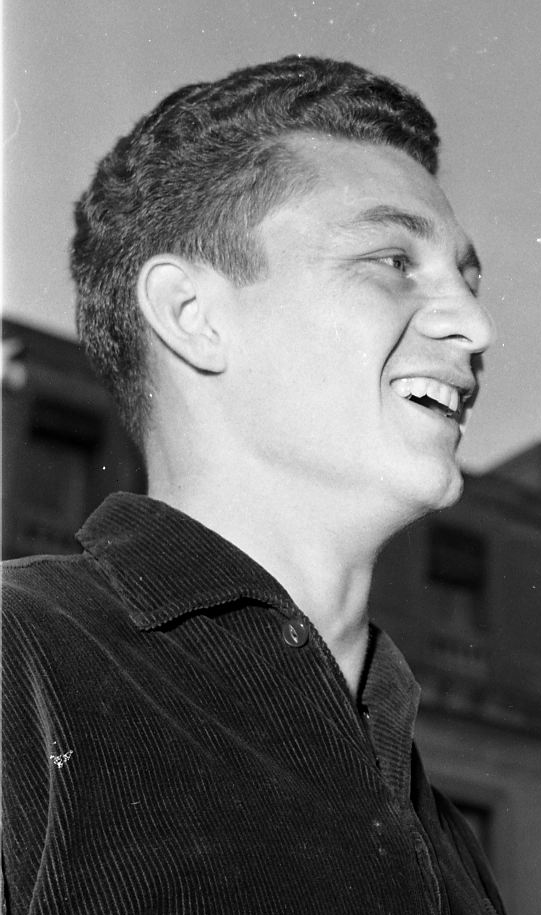
- Monnin 1962

Personal information
- Date of birth: 18 July 1939
- Place of birth: Concepción, Paraguay
- Date of death: 6 January 2023 (aged 83)
- Height: 1.80 m (5 ft 11 in)
- Position: Centre-back

Senior career*
Years	Team	Apps	(Gls)
1958–1959	Cerro Porteño		
1960	Flamengo	28	(0)
1961–1962	Cerro Porteño		
1962–1967	Toulouse FC	158	(2)
1967–1973	Red Star	210	(5)

International career
1959–1962	Paraguay	18?	

Managerial career
- 1974–1978: Red Star (reserve team)
- 1978–1979: Red Star
- 1979–1984: CA Mantes
- * Club domestic league appearances and goals

Carlos Monnin (18 July 1939 – 6 January 2023) was a Paraguayan football player and manager who played as a centre-back.

== Playing career ==
Monín stood out on his school's football team in 1955 in two tournaments in Asunción and Buenos Aires. The following year, he was recruited by Cerro Porteño, based in Asunción, and became a starter in 1958. When he was 19, he made his debut for the national team, playing in four matches in the 1959 South American Championship in Ecuador. In 1960, he transferred to CR Flamengo in Brazil, where he played for one season. He then returned to Cerro Porteño, where he won the 1961 season championship and competed in the 1962 Copa Libertadores. He was again selected for the national team in 1962 for the FIFA World Cup qualification. His total number of national team selections is not certain, but is estimated at 18 appearances.

In 1962, Monín crossed the Atlantic to play for Toulouse FC in the French Division 1. After few appearances initially, he eventually rose to prominence as a defender. In 1967, the club merged with Red Star F.C. and moved to Saint-Ouen-sur-Seine. In 1969, he was responsible for breaking the leg of Olympique Lyonnais forward Fleury Di Nallo, which harmed his reputation. In 1973, Red Star was relegated to Division 2.

== Managerial career ==
In 1978, Monín became manager of Red Star's reserve team, where he still played regularly. In 1979, he was hired as coach of CA Mantes, which played in Division 4. He remained there until 1984.

== Death ==
Monín died on 6 January 2023, at the age of 83.
