= 1966 Paraguayan Primera División season =

1966 Paraguayan Primera División

The 1966 season of the Paraguayan Primera División, the top category of Paraguayan football, was played by 9 teams. The national champions were Cerro Porteño.

== Results ==
=== Standings ===
Pos	Team	Pld	W	D	L	GF	GA	GD	Pts
1	Cerro Porteño	16	10	4	2	33	16	+17	24
2	Guaraní	16	10	3	3	27	14	+13	23
3	Olimpia	16	9	4	3	20	13	+7	22
4	Libertad	16	6	6	4	20	16	+4	18
5	Nacional	16	7	3	6	30	21	+9	17
6	Sol de América	16	5	5	6	18	18	0	15
7	River Plate	16	3	6	7	14	24	−10	12
8	Rubio Ñu	16	2	3	11	13	32	−19	7
9	San Lorenzo	16	2	2	12	12	33	−21	6
