= 1963 Paraguayan Primera División season =

Football league season

The 1963 season of the Paraguayan Primera División, the top category of Paraguayan football, was played by 11 teams. The national champions were Cerro Porteño.

== Results ==
Pos	Team	Pld	W	D	L	GF	GA	GD	Pts
1	Cerro Porteño	20	15	2	3	47	20	+27	32
2	Olimpia	20	10	6	4	35	18	+17	26
3	River Plate	20	7	8	5	32	25	+7	22
4	Libertad	20	9	4	7	39	39	0	22
5	Guaraní	20	6	9	5	29	23	+6	21
6	Nacional	20	6	6	8	29	34	−5	18
7	Presidente Hayes	20	7	4	9	31	42	−11	18
8	Sol de América	20	5	7	8	29	32	−3	17
9	San Lorenzo	20	5	6	9	22	36	−14	16
10	Sportivo Luqueño	20	5	4	11	32	42	−10	14
11	Tembetary	20	4	6	10	24	38	−14	14

Source: rsssf.com

=== Relegation play-offs ===
Sportivo Luqueño	2–2	Tembetary

Tembetary	4–4	Sportivo Luqueño

Sportivo Luqueño	3–1	Tembetary

=== Promotion/relegation play-offs ===
Rubio Ñu	2–1	Sportivo Luqueño

Sportivo Luqueño	1–1	Rubio Ñu
