= Club Atlético Colegiales =

Club Atlético Colegiales may refer to:

- Club Atlético Colegiales (Argentina)
- Club Atlético Colegiales (Paraguay)
