= 1990 Paraguayan Primera División season =

Paraguayan football season

The 1990 season of the Paraguayan Primera División, the top category of Paraguayan football, was played by 12 teams. The national champions were Cerro Porteño.

== Results ==
=== First stage ===
Pos	Team	Pld	W	D	L	GF	GA	GD	Pts
1	Cerro Porteño	0	0	0	0	0	0	0	0
2	Sportivo Luqueño	0	0	0	0	0	0	0	0
3	Libertad	0	0	0	0	0	0	0	0
4	San Lorenzo	0	0	0	0	0	0	0	0
5	Guaraní	0	0	0	0	0	0	0	0
6	Sport Colombia	0	0	0	0	0	0	0	0
7	River Plate	0	0	0	0	0	0	0	0
8	Olimpia	0	0	0	0	0	0	0	0
9	Sol de América	0	0	0	0	0	0	0	0
10	Colegiales	0	0	0	0	0	0	0	0
11	Nacional	0	0	0	0	0	0	0	0
12	Tembetary	0	0	0	0	0	0	0	0

==== Third-place play-offs ====
Libertad	4–3	San Lorenzo

=== Second stage ===
Pos	Team	Pld	W	D	L	GF	GA	GD	Pts
1	Cerro Porteño	0	0	0	0	0	0	0	0
2	Olimpia	0	0	0	0	0	0	0	0
3	Colegiales	0	0	0	0	0	0	0	0
4	San Lorenzo	0	0	0	0	0	0	0	0
5	River Plate	0	0	0	0	0	0	0	0
6	Libertad	0	0	0	0	0	0	0	0
7	Sportivo Luqueño	0	0	0	0	0	0	0	0
8	Sport Colombia	0	0	0	0	0	0	0	0
9	Nacional	0	0	0	0	0	0	0	0
10	Tembetary	0	0	0	0	0	0	0	0
11	Guaraní	0	0	0	0	0	0	0	0
12	Sol de América	0	0	0	0	0	0	0	0

==== Second-place play-offs ====
Olimpia	1–0	Colegiales

=== Third stage ===
==== Group A ====
Pos	Team	Pld	W	D	L	GF	GA	GD	Pts
1	Nacional	5	3	1	1	7	5	+2	7
2	Colegiales	5	3	1	1	6	5	+1	7
3	Cerro Porteño	5	3	0	2	7	5	+2	6
4	Guaraní	5	3	0	2	6	3	+3	6
5	Libertad	5	0	3	2	2	4	−2	3
6	Sport Colombia	5	0	1	4	5	11	−6	1

==== First-place play-offs ====
Nacional	1–0	Colegiales

==== Group B ====
Pos	Team	Pld	W	D	L	GF	GA	GD	Pts
1	Olimpia	5	3	1	1	9	5	+4	7
2	Sol de América	5	3	0	2	8	6	+2	6
3	San Lorenzo	5	2	2	1	11	6	+5	6
4	Sportivo Luqueño	5	2	1	2	7	7	0	5
5	River Plate	5	2	1	2	6	5	+1	5
6	Tembetary	5	0	1	4	3	15	−12	1

=== Fourth stage ===
==== Group A ====
Pos	Team	Pld	W	D	L	GF	GA	GD	Pts
1	Olimpia	3	2	1	0	6	3	+3	6.25
2	Sportivo Luqueño	3	1	1	1	6	4	+2	3.75
3	Nacional	3	0	2	1	4	6	−2	2.5
4	River Plate	3	0	2	1	4	7	−3	2

==== Group B ====
Pos	Team	Pld	W	D	L	GF	GA	GD	Pts
1	Cerro Porteño	3	1	2	0	4	2	+2	6
2	Libertad	3	1	2	0	7	3	+4	4.5
3	San Lorenzo	3	1	1	1	3	6	−3	3
4	Colegiales	3	0	1	2	3	6	−3	1.5

==== Semifinal play-offs ====
Cerro Porteño	4–0	Sportivo Luqueño

Cerro Porteño	2–1	Sportivo Luqueño

Libertad	2–1	Olimpia

Libertad	1–1	Olimpia

==== Final play-offs ====
Cerro Porteño	2–0	Libertad

Cerro Porteño	2–1	Libertad

=== Play-offs for Copa Libertadores ===
Colegiales	3–1	Sportivo Luqueño

Colegiales	2–1	Sportivo Luqueño
