= 1965 Paraguayan Primera División season =

Season of Paraguayan Primera División

The 1965 season of the Paraguayan Primera División, the top category of Paraguayan football, was played by 9 teams. The national champions were Olimpia.

== Results ==
=== Standings ===
Pos	Team	Pld	W	D	L	GF	GA	GD	Pts
1	Guaraní	16	10	3	3	26	12	+14	23
2	Olimpia	16	8	7	1	28	16	+12	23
3	Cerro Porteño	16	5	6	5	18	16	+2	16
4	River Plate	16	6	4	6	18	27	−9	16
5	Rubio Ñu	16	4	6	6	23	23	0	14
6	Libertad	16	3	8	5	23	24	−1	14
7	Presidente Hayes	16	3	8	5	17	23	−6	14
8	Nacional	16	3	6	7	21	19	+2	12
9	San Lorenzo	16	4	4	8	19	33	−14	12

=== Championship play-offs ===
Guaraní	2–1	Olimpia

Olimpia	4–1	Guaraní

Olimpia	2–1	Guaraní

=== Relegation play-offs ===
San Lorenzo	5–1	Presidente Hayes

San Lorenzo	2–1	Presidente Hayes
