= 1983 Paraguayan Primera División season =

Paraguayan football season

The 1983 season of the Paraguayan Primera División, the top category of Paraguayan football, was played by 10 teams. The national champions were Olimpia.

== Results ==
=== Third stage ===
==== Group A ====
Pos	Team	Pld	W	D	L	GF	GA	GD	Pts
1	Sportivo Luqueño	0	0	0	0	0	0	0	0
2	Sol de América	0	0	0	0	0	0	0	0
3	Libertad	0	0	0	0	0	0	0	0
4	Cerro Porteño	0	0	0	0	0	0	0	0
5	River Plate	0	0	0	0	0	0	0	0

==== Group B ====
Pos	Team	Pld	W	D	L	GF	GA	GD	Pts
1	Olimpia	0	0	0	0	0	0	0	0
2	Colegiales	0	0	0	0	0	0	0	0
3	Nacional	0	0	0	0	0	0	0	0
4	Oriental	0	0	0	0	0	0	0	0
5	Guaraní	0	0	0	0	0	0	0	0

=== Final stage ===
Pos	Team	Pld	W	D	L	GF	GA	GD	Pts
1	Olimpia	0	0	0	0	0	0	0	0
2	Sportivo Luqueño	0	0	0	0	0	0	0	0
3	Libertad	0	0	0	0	0	0	0	0
4	Sol de América	0	0	0	0	0	0	0	0
5	Cerro Porteño	0	0	0	0	0	0	0	0
6	Nacional	0	0	0	0	0	0	0	0

=== Championship playoff ===
Pos	Team	Pld	W	D	L	GF	GA	GD	Pts
1	Olimpia	0	0	0	0	0	0	0	0
2	Sportivo Luqueño	0	0	0	0	0	0	0	0
3	Libertad	0	0	0	0	0	0	0	0
