= 1917 Paraguayan Primera División season =

Paraguayan football season

The 1917 season of the Paraguayan Primera División, the top category of Paraguayan football, was played by 8 teams. The national champions were Libertad.

== Results ==
=== Liga Paraguaya de Fútbol ===
Pos	Team	Pld	W	D	L	GF	GA	GD	Pts
1	Olimpia	0	0	0	0	0	0	0	0
2	River Plate	0	0	0	0	0	0	0	0
3	Cerro Porteño	0	0	0	0	0	0	0	0
4	Guaraní	0	0	0	0	0	0	0	0
5	Nacional	0	0	0	0	0	0	0	0
6	Mariscal López	0	0	0	0	0	0	0	0
7	Marte Atlético	0	0	0	0	0	0	0	0
8	Sol de América	0	0	0	0	0	0	0	0

=== Asociación Paraguaya de Fútbol ===
Pos	Team	Pld	W	D	L	GF	GA	GD	Pts
1	Libertad	0	0	0	0	0	0	0	0
2	Boys Scouts	0	0	0	0	0	0	0	0
3	Presidente Hayes	0	0	0	0	0	0	0	0
4	Sastre	0	0	0	0	0	0	0	0
5	Vencedor	0	0	0	0	0	0	0	0
6	10 de Agosto	0	0	0	0	0	0	0	0

=== National title play-off ===
Olimpia	0 – 1	Libertad
