= 1924 Paraguayan Primera División season =

Paraguayan football season

The 1924 season of the Paraguayan Primera División, the top category of Paraguayan football, was played by 11 teams. The national champions were Nacional.

== Results ==
=== Standings ===
Pos	Team	Pld	W	D	L	GF	GA	GD	Pts
1	Nacional	0	0	0	0	0	0	0	0
2	Libertad	0	0	0	0	0	0	0	0
3	Olimpia	0	0	0	0	0	0	0	0
4	River Plate	0	0	0	0	0	0	0	0
5	Guaraní	0	0	0	0	0	0	0	0
6	Sol de América	0	0	0	0	0	0	0	0
7	Presidente Hayes	0	0	0	0	0	0	0	0
8	Cerro Porteño	0	0	0	0	0	0	0	0
9	Atlántida	0	0	0	0	0	0	0	0
10	General Caballero	0	0	0	0	0	0	0	0
11	Sastre	0	0	0	0	0	0	0	0
