= 1960 Paraguayan Primera División season =

Paraguayan football season

The 1960 season of the Paraguayan Primera División, the top category of Paraguayan football, was played by 10 teams. The national champions were Olimpia.

== Results ==
=== Standings ===
Pos	Team	Pld	W	D	L	GF	GA	GD	Pts
1	Olimpia	27	16	6	5	63	22	+41	38
2	Cerro Porteño	27	14	4	9	57	41	+16	32
3	Sportivo Luqueño	27	11	8	8	50	39	+11	30
4	Nacional	27	12	5	10	47	40	+7	29
5	Sol de América	27	9	9	9	39	42	−3	27
6	Libertad	27	11	4	12	34	45	−11	26
7	Tembetary	27	9	5	13	38	46	−8	23
8	General Caballero	27	8	6	13	44	56	−12	22
9	River Plate	27	9	4	14	41	64	−23	22
10	Guaraní	27	6	9	12	30	48	−18	21
