= 1946 Paraguayan Primera División season =

Paraguayan football season

The 1946 season of the Paraguayan Primera División, the top category of Paraguayan football, was played by 10 teams. The national champions were Nacional.

== Results ==
=== Standings ===
Pos	Team	Pld	W	D	L	GF	GA	GD	Pts
1	Nacional	18	13	2	3	58	24	+34	28
2	Sol de América	18	9	6	3	55	32	+23	24
3	Cerro Porteño	18	10	4	4	38	23	+15	24
4	Olimpia	18	9	3	6	54	38	+16	21
5	Guaraní	18	7	7	4	47	34	+13	21
6	Libertad	18	8	5	5	33	32	+1	21
7	Atlántida	18	4	8	6	33	33	0	16
8	Presidente Hayes	18	5	3	10	34	52	−18	13
9	Sportivo Luqueño	18	3	2	13	33	56	−23	8
10	River Plate	18	1	2	15	20	67	−47	4
