= 1914 Paraguayan Primera División season =

Paraguayan football season

The 1914 season of the Paraguayan Primera División, the top category of Paraguayan football, was played by 6 teams. The national champions were Olimpia.

== Results ==
=== Standings ===
Pos	Team	Pld	W	D	L	GF	GA	GD	Pts
1	Olimpia	0	0	0	0	0	0	0	0
2	Cerro Porteño	0	0	0	0	0	0	0	0
3	River Plate	0	0	0	0	0	0	0	0
4	Sol de América	0	0	0	0	0	0	0	0
5	Nacional	0	0	0	0	0	0	0	0
6	Guaraní	0	0	0	0	0	0	0	0

=== National title play-offs ===
Olimpia	2–2	Cerro Porteño

Olimpia	1–1	Cerro Porteño

Olimpia	3–2	Cerro Porteño
