= 1915 Paraguayan Primera División season =

Paraguayan football season

The 1915 season of the Paraguayan Primera División, the top category of Paraguayan football, was played by 6 teams. The national champions were Cerro Porteño.

== Results ==
=== Standings ===
Pos	Team	Pld	W	D	L	GF	GA	GD	Pts
1	Cerro Porteño	0	0	0	0	0	0	0	0
2	Olimpia	0	0	0	0	0	0	0	0
3	Guaraní	0	0	0	0	0	0	0	0
4	Sol de América	0	0	0	0	0	0	0	0
5	Nacional	0	0	0	0	0	0	0	0
6	River Plate	0	0	0	0	0	0	0	0

=== National title play-offs ===
Cerro Porteño	1–1	Olimpia

Cerro Porteño	7–3	Olimpia
