= 1962 Paraguayan Primera División season =

Paraguayan football season

The 1962 season of the Paraguayan Primera División, the top category of Paraguayan football, was played by 11 teams. The national champions were Olimpia.

== Results ==
=== Standings ===
Pos	Team	Pld	W	D	L	GF	GA	GD	Pts
1	Olimpia	20	15	4	1	50	22	+28	34
2	Nacional	20	14	3	3	63	31	+32	31
3	River Plate	20	12	4	4	45	31	+14	28
4	Cerro Porteño	20	7	9	4	39	31	+8	23
5	Guaraní	20	5	8	7	33	27	+6	18
6	Libertad	20	4	8	8	38	43	−5	16
7	Tembetary	20	4	8	8	30	43	−13	16
8	Presidente Hayes	20	5	5	10	36	49	−13	15
9	San Lorenzo	20	5	5	10	31	44	−13	15
10	Sportivo Luqueño	20	5	4	11	25	41	−16	14
11	Sol de América	20	3	4	13	22	50	−28	10

=== Promotion/relegation play-offs ===
Sol de América	3 – 0	General Caballero

General Caballero	2 – 2	Sol de América
