= 1956 Paraguayan Primera División season =

Paraguayan football season

The 1956 season of the Paraguayan Primera División, the top category of Paraguayan football, was played by 8 teams. The national champions were Olimpia.

== Results ==
=== First stage ===
Pos	Team	Pld	W	D	L	GF	GA	GD	Pts
1	Libertad	0	0	0	0	0	0	0	0
2	Olimpia	0	0	0	0	0	0	0	0
3	Sol de América	0	0	0	0	0	0	0	0
4	Cerro Porteño	0	0	0	0	0	0	0	0
5	Guaraní	0	0	0	0	0	0	0	0
6	Presidente Hayes	0	0	0	0	0	0	0	0
7	Nacional	0	0	0	0	0	0	0	0
8	General Genes	0	0	0	0	0	0	0	0

=== Second stage ===
Pos	Team	Pld	W	D	L	GF	GA	GD	Pts
1	Olimpia	0	0	0	0	0	0	0	0
2	Libertad	0	0	0	0	0	0	0	0
3	Sol de América	0	0	0	0	0	0	0	0
4	Cerro Porteño	0	0	0	0	0	0	0	0
5	Guaraní	0	0	0	0	0	0	0	0

=== National title play-offs ===
Olimpia	1–0	Libertad

Olimpia	5–1	Libertad
