= 1916 Paraguayan Primera División season =

Paraguayan football season

The 1916 season of the Paraguayan Primera División, the top flight of Paraguayan domestic football league, was played by 7 teams. The national champions were Olimpia.

== Results ==
=== Standings ===
Pos	Team	Pld	W	D	L	GF	GA	GD	Pts
1	Olimpia	0	0	0	0	0	0	0	0
2	Guaraní	0	0	0	0	0	0	0	0
3	Nacional	0	0	0	0	0	0	0	0
4	Cerro Porteño	0	0	0	0	0	0	0	0
5	River Plate	0	0	0	0	0	0	0	0
6	Sol de América	0	0	0	0	0	0	0	0
7	Mariscal López	0	0	0	0	0	0	0	0
