= 1955 Paraguayan Primera División season =

Paraguayan football season

The 1955 season of the Paraguayan Primera División, the top category of Paraguayan football, was played by 9 teams. The national champions were Libertad.

== Results ==
=== First stage ===
Pos	Team	Pld	W	D	L	GF	GA	GD	Pts
1	Libertad	16	13	1	2	35	17	+18	27
2	Olimpia	16	8	3	5	23	16	+7	19
3	Sol de América	16	7	5	4	27	24	+3	19
4	Cerro Porteño	16	7	3	6	23	23	0	17
5	Guaraní	16	6	5	5	19	23	−4	17
6	Presidente Hayes	16	5	4	7	32	35	−3	14
7	Nacional	16	3	6	7	27	16	+11	12
8	Sportivo Luqueño	16	4	4	8	23	32	−9	12
9	San Lorenzo	16	2	3	11	15	28	−13	7

=== Second stage ===
Pos	Team	Pld	W	D	L	GF	GA	GD	Pts
1	Cerro Porteño	4	3	0	1	8	4	+4	6
2	Libertad	4	2	1	1	12	4	+8	5
3	Guaraní	4	2	0	2	10	12	−2	4
4	Olimpia	4	2	1	1	5	3	+2	5
5	Sol de América	4	0	0	4	3	14	−11	0

=== Aggregate Table ===
Pos	Team	Pld	W	D	L	GF	GA	GD	Pts
1	Libertad	20	15	2	3	47	21	+26	32
2	Olimpia	20	10	4	6	28	19	+9	24
3	Cerro Porteño	20	10	3	7	31	27	+4	23
4	Guaraní	20	8	5	7	29	35	−6	21
5	Sol de América	20	7	5	8	30	38	−8	19
6	Presidente Hayes	16	5	4	7	32	35	−3	14
7	Nacional	16	3	6	7	27	16	+11	12
8	Sportivo Luqueño	16	4	4	8	23	32	−9	12
9	San Lorenzo	16	2	3	11	15	28	−13	7
