= 1967 Paraguayan Primera División season =

1967 Paraguayan Primera División

The 1967 season of the Paraguayan Primera División, the top category of Paraguayan football, was played by 9 teams. The national champions were Guaraní.

== Results ==
=== Standings ===
Pos	Team	Pld	W	D	L	GF	GA	GD	Pts
1	Guaraní	24	15	8	1	34	4	+30	38
2	Libertad	24	15	3	6	50	31	+19	33
3	Olimpia	24	12	9	3	35	20	+15	33
4	Sol de América	24	8	8	8	34	26	+8	24
5	Cerro Porteño	24	9	5	10	33	28	+5	23
6	Rubio Ñu	24	5	9	10	21	32	−11	19
7	Nacional	24	6	5	13	25	30	−5	17
8	River Plate	24	5	7	12	33	45	−12	17
9	San Lorenzo	24	2	8	14	14	53	−39	12

=== Second-place play-offs ===
Libertad	1–0	Olimpia

Libertad	2–0	Olimpia

=== Relegation play-offs ===
San Lorenzo	3–2	Presidente Hayes

San Lorenzo	0–0	Presidente Hayes
