= 2003 Paraguayan Primera División season =

Paraguayan Primera División
- Season: 2003
- Dates: 14 February – 26 October 2003
- Champions: Libertad
- Promoted: Nacional
- Relegated: San Lorenzo

The 2003 Paraguayan Primera División season was held from 14 February to 26 October, with the participation of ten clubs. The tournament was divided into three stages: the Torneo Apertura, won by Libertad; the Torneo Clausura, also won by Libertad after defeating Olimpia in a penalty shootout tiebreaker. By winning both stages, Libertad was automatically crowned Overall Champion of the 2003 season, securing the tenth league title in its history.

== Torneo Apertura 2003 ==
The Torneo Apertura began on 14 February and concluded on 25 May.

=== First stage ===
The first stage was held from 14 February to 20 April. It followed a single round-robin format, with each team playing nine matches. The top six teams at the end of this phase advanced to the next round.

==== Standings ====
Pos.	Team	Pld	W	D	L	GF	GA	GD	Pts
1	Libertad	9	6	3	0	13	3	+10	21
2	Cerro Porteño	9	5	3	1	20	8	+12	18
3	Olimpia	9	4	4	1	16	11	+5	16
4	Sol de América	9	3	4	2	12	7	+5	13
5	Tacuary	9	4	1	4	15	16	–1	13
6	Guaraní	9	3	3	3	18	20	–2	12
7	Sportivo Luqueño	9	3	2	4	14	12	+2	11
8	Sport Colombia	9	2	2	5	14	20	–6	8
9	12 de Octubre	9	1	4	4	8	18	–10	7
10	San Lorenzo	9	1	0	8	10	25	–15	3

Pld = Matches played; W = Wins; D = Draws; L = Losses; GF = Goals for; GA = Goals against; GD = Goal difference; Pts = Points

Qualification for Final Stage of the Apertura Tournament

=== Final stage ===
==== Semifinals ====
The top six teams from the first stage advanced to the semifinals, which were divided into two groups. Libertad and Cerro Porteño began this stage with a 2-point advantage for finishing first and second, respectively, in the initial standings. Each team played once against the others in their group. The team with the highest number of points in each group advanced to the final.

===== Group 1 =====
Pos.	Team	Pld	W	D	L	GF	GA	GD	Pts
1	Libertad	2	1	1	0	2	0	+2	6
2	Tacuary	2	1	1	0	2	0	+2	4
3	Olimpia	2	0	0	2	0	4	–4	0

Pld = Matches played; W = Wins; D = Draws; L = Losses; GF = Goals for; GA = Goals against; GD = Goal difference; Pts = Points

Date	Home team	Score	Away team
26 April	Tacuary	2–0	Olimpia
4 May	Libertad	0–0	Tacuary
11 May	Libertad	2–0	Olimpia

===== Group 2 =====
Pos.	Team	Pld	W	D	L	GF	GA	GD	Pts
1	Guaraní	2	2	0	0	3	1	+2	6
2	Sol de América	2	1	0	1	4	3	+1	3
3	Cerro Porteño	2	0	0	2	3	6	–3	0

Date		Match
April 26	Guaraní	1:0	Sol de América
May 1	Guaraní	2:1	Cerro Porteño
May 11	Cerro Porteño	2:4	Sol de América

18 May 2003, 18:10

Guaraní	0–0	Libertad
	ABC Digital

Estadio Defensores del Chaco, Asunción, Paraguay
Attendance: 5,242
Referee: Carlos Torres (Paraguay)
25 May 2003, 18:15

Libertad	1–0 (0–0)	Guaraní
Gustavo Morínigo 67'	ABC Digital

Estadio Defensores del Chaco, Asunción, Paraguay
Attendance: approx. 18,000
Referee: Carlos Amarilla (Paraguay)

== 2003 Clausura Tournament ==
The tournament started on June 15 and concluded on October 30. The competition format was a round-robin, with 18 matchdays played.

=== Standings ===
Pos.	Team	Pld	W	D	L	GF	GA	GD	Pts
1	Libertad (Note: As Olimpia and Libertad finished tied on points, a playoff match was held to determine the champion.)	18	9	6	3	32	20	+12	33
2	Olimpia	18	9	6	3	30	18	+12	33
3	Cerro Porteño	18	9	5	4	24	15	+9	32
4	Guaraní	18	7	6	5	24	17	+7	27
5	Sportivo Luqueño	18	7	6	5	21	20	+1	27
6	Sol de América	18	4	7	7	17	16	+1	19
7	12 de Octubre	18	4	7	7	7	14	–7	19
8	San Lorenzo	18	4	6	8	18	32	–14	18
9	Tacuary	18	4	5	9	20	29	–9	17
10	Sport Colombia	18	4	4	10	22	34	–12	16

Pos=Position; Pld=Matches played; W=Wins; D=Draws; L=Losses; GF=Goals for; GA=Goals against; GD=Goal difference; Pts=Points

=== Playoff match for the Clausura 2003 champion ===
30 October 2003

Olimpia	0–0 (5–6 pen)	Libertad

Estadio Defensores del Chaco, Asunción, Paraguay
Attendance: 16,954
Referee: Nelson Valenzuela (Paraguay)

=== Results ===
See Results of the Clausura Tournament.

=== Pre-Libertadores 2004 ===
Guaraní and Olimpia finished second in the Apertura and Clausura tournaments respectively, so they played a match to decide the second qualifying spot for the 2004 Copa Libertadores.

2 November 2003

Guaraní	1–1 (1–0 at halftime)	Olimpia
Ángel Ortiz 28'		Juan Carlos Benítez 90'

Estadio Defensores del Chaco, Asunción, Paraguay
Attendance: 1,319
Referee: Carlos Amarilla (Paraguay)
5 November 2003

Olimpia	2–3 (0–2 at halftime)	Guaraní
Gilberto Palacios 51'; Juan Carlos Benítez 80'		Pablo Giménez 5'; Fabio Nunes 38'; Pablo Giménez 48'

Estadio Defensores del Chaco, Asunción, Paraguay
Attendance: Approx. 1,500
Referee: Ubaldo Aquino (Paraguay)

With an aggregate score of 4–3, Guaraní qualified for the 2004 Copa Libertadores.

=== Pre-Libertadores Liguilla ===
The top four teams in the Clausura tournament standings (excluding those already qualified) played a mini-tournament for the final berth in the 2004 Copa Libertadores. Olimpia started with a one-point bonus for being the highest-placed team in the Clausura among the participants in the liguilla.

Pos.	Team	Pld	W	D	L	GF	GA	GD	Pts
1.	Olimpia	3	2	1	0	4	1	+3	8
2.	Sportivo Luqueño	3	2	0	1	8	4	+4	6
3.	Cerro Porteño	3	1	0	2	4	7	−3	3
4.	Sol de América	3	0	1	2	5	9	−4	1

Pos = Position; Pld = Matches played; W = Wins; D = Draws; L = Losses; GF = Goals for; GA = Goals against; GD = Goal difference; Pts = Points

Qualified for 2004 Copa Libertadores

==== Matchday 1 ====
8 November 2003

Sportivo Luqueño	0–1	Olimpia
		Julio Enciso (p) 79'

Estadio Defensores del Chaco, Asunción
Referee: Nelson Valenzuela (Paraguay)
8 November 2003

Cerro Porteño	3–2	Sol de América
Érwin Ávalos 64'; Julio dos Santos 67', 86'		José Franco 37'; Marcial Garay 55'

Estadio Defensores del Chaco, Asunción
Attendance: 1,478
Referee: Atilio Invernizzi (Paraguay)

==== Matchday 2 ====
11 November 2003, 18:00

Sportivo Luqueño	5–2	Sol de América
Christian Andersen 19'; Hugo Centurión 25', 58', 75'; Daniel Ferreira 67'		José Franco 6'; Miguel Cárdenas 90+2' (pen.)

Estadio Defensores del Chaco, Asunción
Referee: Juan Ruiz Díaz (Paraguay)
11 November 2003, 20:30

Cerro Porteño	0–2	Olimpia
		Francisco Esteche 9'; Julio Enciso 89'

Estadio Defensores del Chaco, Asunción
Attendance: 9,143
Referee: Carlos Amarilla (Paraguay)

==== Matchday 3 ====
14 November 2003

Olimpia	1–1	Sol de América
Diego Figueredo 84'		Aureliano Torres 32' (pen.)

Estadio Manuel Ferreira, Asunción
Attendance: Approx. 100
Referee: Hugo Vera (Paraguay)
14 November 2003

Sportivo Luqueño	3–1	Cerro Porteño
Héctor Sánchez 28', 31'; Arnaldo Medina 74'		Osvaldo Hobecker 60'

Estadio Feliciano Cáceres, Asunción
Attendance: 151
Referee: Antonio Arias (Paraguay)

== Final season standings ==
First, the criteria used to determine each club's qualification type for the following year are outlined, along with an explanation of what each entails. This is followed by a detailed summary of the outcomes.

=== Aggregate table ===
The aggregate table is the result of adding the points obtained by each team in both the 2003 Apertura and Clausura tournaments.

Pos.	Team	Pts	Pld	W	D	L	GF	GA	GD
1st	Libertad	54	27	15	9	3	45	23	+22
2nd	Cerro Porteño	50	27	14	8	5	44	23	+21
3rd	Olimpia	49	27	13	10	4	46	29	+17
4th	Guaraní	39	27	10	9	8	42	37	+5
5th	Sportivo Luqueño	38	27	10	8	9	35	32	+3
6th	Sol de América	32	27	7	11	9	29	23	+6
7th	Tacuary	30	27	8	6	13	35	35	0
8th	12 de Octubre	26	27	5	11	11	15	32	–17
9th	Sport Colombia	24	27	6	6	15	36	54	–18
10th	San Lorenzo	21	27	5	6	16	28	57	–29

Pts = Points; Pld = Matches played; W = Wins; D = Draws; L = Losses; GF = Goals for; GA = Goals against; GD = Goal difference

Qualified for 2004 Copa Libertadores

=== Average points ===
The average points of a team is calculated by dividing its accumulated points over the last three seasons by the number of matches played during that period.

=== Promotion playoff ===
This is a two-legged knockout series, with each team playing one match at home, to determine which division each club will play in the following season. It is contested between the second-to-last team in the average points table and the second-placed team from the lower division. The rules stated that if both teams were level on points after the two matches, goal difference would be used to determine the winner. If the tie persisted, a penalty shoot-out would be held.

==== Promotion playoff ====
1 November 2003
21:15

3 de Febrero	1–2	Tacuary
Adolfo Fatecha 90+2'		Raúl Román 77', 81'

Estadio Antonio Oddone Sarubbi, Asunción
Attendance: 3,925
Referee: Ubaldo Aquino (Paraguay)
9 November 2003
19:05

Tacuary	2–1	3 de Febrero
Diego Canesa 58'; Silvio Garay 90+1'		Roberto Gamarra 15'

Estadio Roberto Béttega, Asunción
Attendance: 1,704
Referee: Epifanio González (Paraguay)

With an aggregate score of 4–2, Tacuary remained in the Primera División for the 2004 season. With an aggregate score of 4–2, Tacuary remained in the Primera División.

=== Qualification for international tournaments ===
The accumulated points table was used to determine the APF representatives in CONMEBOL competitions for the following year.

- 2004 Copa Libertadores (three qualifiers). The first spot went to the absolute champion of the 2003 Championship (Libertad). The second spot went to the Clausura or Apertura champion who was not the absolute champion of 2003 (Guaraní, due to a playoff between the two runners-up since Libertad won both tournaments). The third spot was awarded to the winner of the Pre-Libertadores playoff (Olimpia).

=== Relegation and promotion playoff ===
The average points table was used to determine relegation and the playoff participants:

- San Lorenzo was directly relegated to the Second Division for finishing last in the average points table. They were replaced by the Intermedia champion, Club Nacional.
- Tacuary, having the second lowest average, had to play a two-legged promotion playoff against the Intermedia runner-up, 3 de Febrero. The first leg ended with a 2–1 victory for Tacuary. The decisive second leg was also won by Tacuary by 2–1. Ultimately, the team from the higher division secured its spot for one more season with a 4–2 aggregate score.
