= 1911 Paraguayan Primera División season =

Paraguayan football season

The following article presents a summary of the 1911 football (soccer) season in Paraguay.

== First Division ==
The Paraguayan first division championship was played for the "Copa El Diario", a trophy issued by the newspaper of the same name. Six teams participated in the tournament which was played in a two-round all-play-all system, being the team with the most points at the end of the two rounds the champion. Club nacional won its second championship after playing 9 games (one less than the other teams); with 6 wins, 3 draws and no losses.

Pos	Team	Pld	W	D	L	GF	GA	GD	Pts
1	Nacional	9	6	3	0	0	0	0	15
2	Atlántida	0	0	0	0	0	0	0	0
3	Sol de América	0	0	0	0	0	0	0	0
4	Guarani	0	0	0	0	0	0	0	0
5	Olimpia	0	0	0	0	0	0	0	0
6	Libertad	9	0	1	8	0	0	0	1
