= 1913 Paraguayan Primera División season =

Paraguayan football season

The 1913 season of the Paraguayan Primera División, the top category of Paraguayan football, was played by 5 teams. The national champions were Cerro Porteño.

== Results ==
=== Standings ===
| Pos | Team | Pld | W | D | L | GF | GA | GD | Pts |
|---|---|---|---|---|---|---|---|---|---|
| 1 | Cerro Porteño | 0 | 0 | 0 | 0 | 0 | 0 | 0 | 0 |
| 2 | Sol de América | 0 | 0 | 0 | 0 | 0 | 0 | 0 | 0 |
| 3 | Nacional | 0 | 0 | 0 | 0 | 0 | 0 | 0 | 0 |
| 4 | Olimpia | 0 | 0 | 0 | 0 | 0 | 0 | 0 | 0 |
| 5 | Guaraní | 0 | 0 | 0 | 0 | 0 | 0 | 0 | 0 |
