= 1943 Paraguayan Primera División season =

Paraguayan football season

The 1943 season of the Paraguayan Primera División, the top category of Paraguayan football, was played by 10 teams. The national champions were Libertad.

== Results ==
=== Standings ===
Pos	Team	Pld	W	D	L	GF	GA	GD	Pts
1	Libertad	18	14	3	1	55	22	+33	31
2	Olimpia	18	10	3	5	37	30	+7	23
3	Sol de América	18	8	6	4	38	30	+8	22
4	Guaraní	18	9	1	8	47	39	+8	19
5	Cerro Porteño	18	9	1	8	41	37	+4	19
6	Nacional	18	6	4	8	34	43	−9	16
7	Atlántida	18	5	4	9	33	40	−7	14
8	Presidente Hayes	18	5	4	9	27	43	−16	14
9	River Plate	18	4	5	9	31	43	−12	13
10	Sportivo Luqueño	18	4	3	11	25	37	−12	11
