= 1920 Paraguayan Primera División season =

Paraguayan football season

The 1920 season of the Paraguayan Primera División, the top category of Paraguayan football, was played by 10 teams. The national champions were Libertad.

== Results ==
=== Standings ===
Pos	Team	Pld	W	D	L	GF	GA	GD	Pts
1	Libertad	0	0	0	0	0	0	0	0
2	Olimpia	0	0	0	0	0	0	0	0
3	Cerro Porteño	0	0	0	0	0	0	0	0
4	Atlántida	0	0	0	0	0	0	0	0
5	Presidente Hayes	0	0	0	0	0	0	0	0
6	Nacional	0	0	0	0	0	0	0	0
7	Sol de América	0	0	0	0	0	0	0	0
8	Guaraní	0	0	0	0	0	0	0	0
9	River Plate	0	0	0	0	0	0	0	0
10	Sastre	0	0	0	0	0	0	0	0
