= 1907 Paraguayan Primera División season =

Paraguayan football season

The following article presents a summary of the 1907 football (soccer) season in Paraguay.

== Liga Paraguaya results ==
The championship was played for the "Copa El Diario", a trophy issued by the newspaper of the same name. It was won again by the previous year's winner, Guaraní.

| Pos | Team | Pld | W | D | L | GF | GA | GD | Pts |
|---|---|---|---|---|---|---|---|---|---|
| 1 | Guarani | 0 | 0 | 0 | 0 | 0 | 0 | 0 | 0 |
| 2 | Olimpia | 0 | 0 | 0 | 0 | 0 | 0 | 0 | 0 |
| 3 | Libertad | 0 | 0 | 0 | 0 | 0 | 0 | 0 | 0 |
| 5 | Nacional | 0 | 0 | 0 | 0 | 0 | 0 | 0 | 0 |
| 6 | Atlántida | 0 | 0 | 0 | 0 | 0 | 0 | 0 | 0 |
