= 1987 Paraguayan Primera División season =

Paraguayan football season

The 1987 season of the Paraguayan Primera División, the top category of Paraguayan football, was played by 10 teams. The national champions were Cerro Porteño.

== Results ==
=== First stage ===
| Pos | Team | Pld | W | D | L | GF | GA | GD | Pts |
|---|---|---|---|---|---|---|---|---|---|
| 1 | Cerro Porteño | 9 | 5 | 3 | 1 | 15 | 5 | +10 | 13 |
| 2 | Nacional | 9 | 4 | 4 | 1 | 12 | 8 | +4 | 12 |
| 3 | Colegiales | 9 | 3 | 5 | 1 | 5 | 4 | +1 | 11 |
| 4 | Sol de América | 9 | 4 | 3 | 2 | 8 | 9 | −1 | 11 |
| 5 | General Caballero | 9 | 3 | 3 | 3 | 8 | 7 | +1 | 9 |
| 6 | Guaraní | 9 | 2 | 3 | 4 | 10 | 10 | 0 | 7 |
| 7 | Libertad | 9 | 2 | 3 | 4 | 11 | 13 | −2 | 7 |
| 8 | Sport Colombia | 9 | 0 | 7 | 2 | 8 | 11 | −3 | 7 |
| 9 | Olimpia | 9 | 1 | 5 | 3 | 4 | 7 | −3 | 7 |
| 10 | Sportivo Luqueño | 9 | 2 | 2 | 5 | 10 | 17 | −7 | 6 |

=== Second stage ===
| Pos | Team | Pld | W | D | L | GF | GA | GD | Pts |
|---|---|---|---|---|---|---|---|---|---|
| 1 | Cerro Porteño | 9 | 6 | 2 | 1 | 10 | 4 | +6 | 14 |
| 2 | Olimpia | 9 | 4 | 3 | 2 | 12 | 9 | +3 | 11 |
| 3 | Sport Colombia | 9 | 4 | 3 | 2 | 10 | 9 | +1 | 11 |
| 4 | Colegiales | 9 | 4 | 3 | 2 | 8 | 5 | +3 | 11 |
| 5 | Sol de América | 9 | 4 | 2 | 3 | 12 | 10 | +2 | 10 |
| 6 | General Caballero | 9 | 1 | 6 | 2 | 8 | 9 | −1 | 8 |
| 7 | Sportivo Luqueño | 9 | 2 | 3 | 4 | 10 | 12 | −2 | 7 |
| 8 | Libertad | 9 | 1 | 5 | 3 | 6 | 9 | −3 | 7 |
| 9 | Nacional | 9 | 2 | 3 | 4 | 8 | 10 | −2 | 7 |
| 10 | Guaraní | 9 | 1 | 2 | 6 | 6 | 13 | −7 | 4 |

=== Third stage ===
| Pos | Team | Pld | W | D | L | GF | GA | GD | Pts |
|---|---|---|---|---|---|---|---|---|---|
| 1 | Cerro Porteño | 9 | 6 | 2 | 1 | 11 | 3 | +8 | 14 |
| 2 | Libertad | 9 | 6 | 1 | 2 | 11 | 6 | +5 | 13 |
| 3 | Guaraní | 9 | 5 | 2 | 2 | 13 | 8 | +5 | 12 |
| 4 | General Caballero | 9 | 4 | 3 | 2 | 11 | 11 | 0 | 11 |
| 5 | Sol de América | 9 | 3 | 3 | 3 | 12 | 9 | +3 | 9 |
| 6 | Olimpia | 9 | 3 | 3 | 3 | 7 | 8 | −1 | 9 |
| 7 | Sport Colombia | 9 | 3 | 2 | 4 | 12 | 16 | −4 | 8 |
| 8 | Colegiales | 9 | 2 | 2 | 5 | 10 | 11 | −1 | 6 |
| 9 | Sportivo Luqueño | 9 | 1 | 4 | 4 | 3 | 8 | −5 | 6 |
| 10 | Nacional | 9 | 0 | 2 | 7 | 6 | 16 | −10 | 2 |
