= 1945 Paraguayan Primera División season =

Paraguayan football season

The 1945 season of the Paraguayan Primera División, the top category of Paraguayan football, was played by 10 teams. The national champions were Libertad.

== Results ==
=== Standings ===
Pos	Team	Pld	W	D	L	GF	GA	GD	Pts
1	Libertad	18	13	1	4	58	31	+27	27
2	Cerro Porteño	18	11	2	5	40	31	+9	24
3	Presidente Hayes	18	8	4	6	41	32	+9	20
4	Sol de América	18	9	2	7	39	33	+6	20
5	Olimpia	18	8	4	6	38	34	+4	20
6	Nacional	18	7	4	7	35	27	+8	18
7	Guaraní	18	9	0	9	43	42	+1	18
8	Atlántida	18	5	2	11	33	50	−17	12
9	Sportivo Luqueño	18	5	1	12	32	51	−19	11
10	River Plate	18	4	2	12	31	59	−28	10
