= 1942 Paraguayan Primera División season =

Paraguayan football season

Paraguayan Primera División
- Season: 1942
- Champions: Nacional

The 1942 season of the Paraguayan Primera División, the top category of Paraguayan football, was played by 10 teams. The national champions were Nacional.

== Results ==
=== Standings ===
Pos	Team	Pld	W	D	L	GF	GA	GD	Pts	Qualification or relegation
1	Nacional (C)	18	12	2	4	64	36	+28	26	National title play-off
2	Cerro Porteño	18	12	2	4	50	30	+20	26	National title play-off
3	Guaraní	18	11	3	4	43	26	+17	25	
4	Olimpia	18	9	5	4	47	28	+19	23	
5	Libertad	18	8	3	7	41	36	+5	19	
6	Sol de América	18	5	7	6	33	35	−2	17	
7	Atlántida	18	5	3	10	40	58	−18	13	
8	Presidente Hayes	18	4	4	10	51	24	+27	12	
9	Sportivo Luqueño	18	5	2	11	30	42	−12	12	
10	River Plate	18	3	2	13	29	29	0	8	

Source: RSSSF
(C) Champions

=== National title play-off ===
First leg

Nacional	3–0	Cerro Porteño
	Report

Second leg

Nacional	w/o	Cerro Porteño
	Report

After the first leg, Cerro Porteño protested against Nacional for playing Arsenio Erico in the match due to the player having already featured for Argentinian club Independiente during the season. The Disciplinary Committee deemed it only an offence if both clubs were Paraguayan which led to Cerro Porteño's withdrawal from the play-off.
