= 1984 Paraguayan Primera División season =

Paraguayan football season

The 1984 season of the Paraguayan Primera División, the top category of Paraguayan football, was played by 10 teams. The national champions were Guaraní.

== Results ==
=== First stage ===
| Pos | Team | Pld | W | D | L | GF | GA | GD | Pts |
|---|---|---|---|---|---|---|---|---|---|
| 1 | Olimpia | 9 | 5 | 2 | 2 | 14 | 8 | +6 | 12 |
| 2 | Guaraní | 8 | 6 | 0 | 2 | 16 | 10 | +6 | 12 |
| 3 | Cerro Porteño | 9 | 4 | 3 | 2 | 12 | 8 | +4 | 11 |
| 4 | Sol de América | 9 | 5 | 0 | 4 | 11 | 11 | 0 | 10 |
| 5 | Libertad | 8 | 2 | 4 | 2 | 13 | 7 | +6 | 8 |
| 6 | River Plate | 9 | 3 | 2 | 4 | 9 | 9 | 0 | 8 |
| 7 | Colegiales | 9 | 3 | 1 | 5 | 7 | 10 | −3 | 7 |
| 8 | Nacional | 9 | 2 | 3 | 4 | 6 | 10 | −4 | 7 |
| 9 | Sportivo Luqueño | 9 | 2 | 3 | 4 | 10 | 16 | −6 | 7 |
| 10 | Tembetary | 9 | 2 | 2 | 5 | 9 | 18 | −9 | 6 |

==== First-place play-off ====
| Olimpia | 6–3 | Guaraní |

=== Second stage ===
| Pos | Team | Pld | W | D | L | GF | GA | GD | Pts |
|---|---|---|---|---|---|---|---|---|---|
| 1 | Guaraní | 9 | 7 | 2 | 0 | 19 | 10 | +9 | 16 |
| 2 | Cerro Porteño | 9 | 5 | 3 | 1 | 15 | 7 | +8 | 13 |
| 3 | Libertad | 9 | 5 | 2 | 2 | 14 | 7 | +7 | 12 |
| 4 | Colegiales | 9 | 3 | 3 | 3 | 10 | 10 | 0 | 9 |
| 5 | Olimpia | 9 | 2 | 4 | 3 | 15 | 16 | −1 | 8 |
| 6 | River Plate | 9 | 1 | 5 | 3 | 11 | 12 | −1 | 7 |
| 7 | Sol de América | 9 | 2 | 3 | 4 | 13 | 15 | −2 | 7 |
| 8 | Nacional | 9 | 2 | 3 | 4 | 6 | 13 | −7 | 7 |
| 9 | Tembetary | 9 | 1 | 4 | 4 | 5 | 10 | −5 | 6 |
| 10 | Sportivo Luqueño | 9 | 2 | 1 | 6 | 6 | 14 | −8 | 5 |

=== Third stage ===
==== Group A ====
| Pos | Team | Pld | W | D | L | GF | GA | GD | Pts |
|---|---|---|---|---|---|---|---|---|---|
| 1 | Libertad | 10 | 5 | 4 | 1 | 11 | 5 | +6 | 14 |
| 2 | Olimpia | 10 | 5 | 4 | 1 | 10 | 4 | +6 | 14 |
| 3 | Colegiales | 10 | 4 | 4 | 2 | 14 | 8 | +6 | 12 |
| 4 | Tembetary | 10 | 3 | 1 | 6 | 5 | 13 | −8 | 7 |
| 5 | Nacional | 10 | 1 | 3 | 6 | 5 | 15 | −10 | 5 |

==== Group B ====
| Pos | Team | Pld | W | D | L | GF | GA | GD | Pts |
|---|---|---|---|---|---|---|---|---|---|
| 1 | River Plate | 10 | 4 | 4 | 2 | 15 | 9 | +6 | 12 |
| 2 | Sportivo Luqueño | 10 | 3 | 6 | 1 | 7 | 7 | 0 | 12 |
| 3 | Sol de América | 10 | 2 | 6 | 2 | 9 | 9 | 0 | 10 |
| 4 | Cerro Porteño | 10 | 2 | 5 | 3 | 13 | 12 | +1 | 9 |
| 5 | Guaraní | 10 | 0 | 5 | 5 | 7 | 14 | −7 | 5 |

=== Final Stage ===
- Teams started with the following "bonus" points: Guaraní with 3 bonus points, Olimpia with 4 bonus points, Cerro Porteño and Libertad with 1 bonus point.

| Pos | Team | Pld | W | D | L | GF | GA | GD | Pts |
|---|---|---|---|---|---|---|---|---|---|
| 1 | Guaraní | 5 | 2 | 3 | 0 | 10 | 6 | +4 | 10 |
| 2 | Cerro Porteño | 5 | 3 | 2 | 0 | 7 | 2 | +5 | 9 |
| 3 | Olimpia | 5 | 1 | 1 | 3 | 5 | 7 | −2 | 7 |
| 4 | Libertad | 5 | 1 | 3 | 1 | 2 | 4 | −2 | 6 |
| 5 | Sol de América | 5 | 1 | 3 | 1 | 6 | 6 | 0 | 5 |
| 6 | Colegiales | 5 | 0 | 2 | 3 | 2 | 7 | −5 | 2 |
