= 1918 Paraguayan Primera División season =

Paraguayan football season

Paraguayan Primera División
- Season: 1918
- Champions: Cerro Porteño

The 1918 season of the Paraguayan Primera División, the top category of Paraguayan football, was played by 9 teams. The national champions were Cerro Porteño.

== Results ==
=== Standings ===
Pos	Team	Pld	Pts	Qualification or relegation
1	Cerro Porteño (C)	16	21	National title play-offs
2	Nacional	16	21	National title play-offs
3	Olimpia	16	18	
4	River Plate	16	17	
5	Guarani	16	16	
6	Libertad	16	16	
7	Marte Atlético	16	14	
8	Atlántida	16	11	
9	Sol de América (O)	16	10	Relegation play-off

Source: RSSSF
(C) Champions; (O) Play-off winners

=== National title play-offs ===
10 November 1918

Cerro Porteño	2–2 (a.e.t.)	Nacional
L. Avila	Report	F. Casado 83'; Escalada (90-105)

The original playoff match was abandoned during the first half of extra time with the score at 1–2. Resumption of the match was further delayed to 12 January 1919 due to the Great Influenza epidemic.

1919
First replay

Cerro Porteño	1–1	Nacional
?	Report	C. Ferreira

1919
Second replay

Cerro Porteño	4–2	Nacional
	Report

=== Relegation play-off ===
1919

Sol de América	5–2	Vencedor
