= 1906 Paraguayan Primera División season =

Paraguayan football season

The following article presents a summary of the 1906 football (soccer) season in Paraguay.

== Overview ==
Shortly after the foundation of the governing body of football, the Liga Paraguaya de Fútbol (known today as Asociación Paraguaya de Fútbol) on June 18, the first championship was organized with the participation of the five original founding clubs and Club 14 de Mayo. The first match was played on July 8 between Olimpia and Guaraní, resulting in a 1–1 tie.

Salvador Melián of Guaraní has the honor of being the first scorer in Paraguayan league history, while Miguel Díaz of Olimpia was the second scorer in the 1-1 tie match.

== Liga Paraguaya results ==
Guaraní was the first Paraguayan champion. The tournament was played between six teams in a two round all-play-all system, being the team with the most points at the end of the two rounds the champion. Guaraní played 10 games, winning 8, drawing 2 and not losing any of them.

Pos	Team	Pld	W	D	L	GF	GA	GD	Pts
1	Guaraní	10	8	2	0	33	4	+29	18
2	Olimpia	0	0	0	0	0	0	0	0
3	Libertad	0	0	0	0	0	0	0	0
4	General Díaz	0	0	0	0	0	0	0	0
5	Nacional	0	0	0	0	0	0	0	0
6	14 de Mayo	0	0	0	0	0	0	0	0

- Note: A playoff match was played to decide the second place, as both Olimpia and Libertad finished with the same number of points. Olimpia won the match 5-4.

== See also ==
- Football in Paraguay
