= Liga Deportiva del Amambay =

Paraguayan football governing body

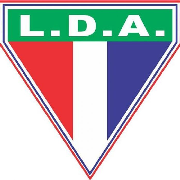
Shield of the Amambay Sports Football League.

Liga Deportiva del Amambay initialed LDA is the department governing body for association football in the Amambay Department in Paraguay. It is affiliated with the Asociación Paraguaya de Fútbol, the sport's national governing body.

The LDA was founded on 25 May 1953 during which only four clubs existed: Sportivo 2 de Mayo, Aquidabán, Independiente Fútbol Club and Sportivo Obrero.

Liga Deportiva del Amambay's league is the Paraguayan Cuarta Division in the Paraguayan football league system, where which the top clubs qualify for the Primera División B Nacional, Paraguay's third division.

== Clubs ==
- América Foot Ball Club
- Club Aquidabán
- Club Atlético Bernardino Caballero
- Atlético Pedro Juan Caballero
- Club Deportivo 1º de Marzo
- General Diaz Foot Ball Club
- Club Sportivo 2 de Mayo
- Club Sportivo Obrero
- Independiente Fútbol Club
- Mariscal Estigarribia Fútbol Club
