= Lácteos Lactolanda =

Dairy in Paraguay

Lácteos Lactolanda is a Paraguayan dairy cooperative founded in 1979.

== Overview ==
It is located in Juan Eulogio Estigarribia in the Caaguazu Department. The cooperative produces 85% of dairy products in Paraguay. Since 2019, Paraguayan footballer Roque Santa Cruz became the face of company through publicity campaigns.
