= 1961 Paraguayan Primera División season =

Paraguayan football season

The 1961 season of the Paraguayan Primera División, the top category of Paraguayan football, was played by 11 teams. The national champions were Cerro Porteño.

== Results ==
Pos	Team	Pld	W	D	L	GF	GA	GD	Pts
1	Olimpia	20	12	4	4	39	19	+20	28
2	Cerro Porteño	20	11	6	3	43	19	+24	28
3	Sportivo Luqueño	20	12	4	4	42	23	+19	28
4	Guaraní	20	9	9	2	40	29	+11	27
5	Libertad	20	9	6	5	36	29	+7	24
6	Nacional	20	6	8	6	30	26	+4	20
7	River Plate	20	4	8	8	21	29	−8	16
8	San Lorenzo	20	4	6	10	22	39	−17	14
9	Sol de América	20	5	3	12	30	43	−13	13
10	Presidente Hayes	20	2	7	11	25	47	−22	11
11	Tembetary	20	4	3	13	25	50	−25	11

=== Championship Playoffs ===
Pos	Team	Pld	W	D	L	GF	GA	GD	Pts
1	Cerro Porteño	4	3	1	0	11	2	+9	7
2	Olimpia	4	2	1	1	8	9	−1	5
3	Sportivo Luqueño	4	0	0	4	3	11	−8	0

=== 10th/11th-place play-offs ===
Presidente Hayes	2–1	Atlético Tembetary

Presidente Hayes	0–3	Atlético Tembetary

=== Promotion/relegation play-offs ===
Rubio Ñu	3–1	Atlético Tembetary

Atlético Tembetary	0–1	Rubio Ñu
