= Club Nacional de Regatas El Mbiguá =

Paraguayan multisport club

Club Nacional de Regatas El Mbiguá (most commonly known as "Club Mbiguá") is a multisport club based in Asunción, Paraguay. The club was founded on May 6, 1902 as a rowing club.

The club is famous in Paraguay for its rowing team and takes advantage of its location along the banks of the Paraguay River to train its athletes. The club also has a field hockey team and had a brief stint in football (soccer) when it participated in the Paraguayan first division tournament in 1909 and 1910.

== History ==
The Paraguay River, where the conquerors traveled, witnessed a pioneering birth: the El Mbiguá National Regatta Club, which, limited in its name, was the cradle of many sports and the first among the entities of its kind in the country. It was on May 6, 1902 when El Mbiguá began to travel the roads of Paraguayan sports, one hundred and one years ago. Many of the founding documents were lost when a voracious fire consumed the club's floating headquarters, on the day of San José in 1920, and together with them, the founding documents -including the minutes- of the Guaraní club, whose headquarters operated there. site.

However, as many of the founders were still living at that time, it was possible to rebuild. Thus, we know that those who gave life to the club were called Federico García Olías, Agustín Carrón, Enrique L. Pinho, Octavio Battesti, Egildo Zin, Ernesto Lerquemain, Alfredo J. Oliver, Emilio Mantero, José Contestable, Ernesto Oliver, Julián Quinart and Emilio Scolari. These also formed the first directive commission.

Two floating pontoons, built of iron and donated by the Arsenals, were the venue for the first social events.
