= APF División de Honor =

Paraguayan association football league

División de Honor
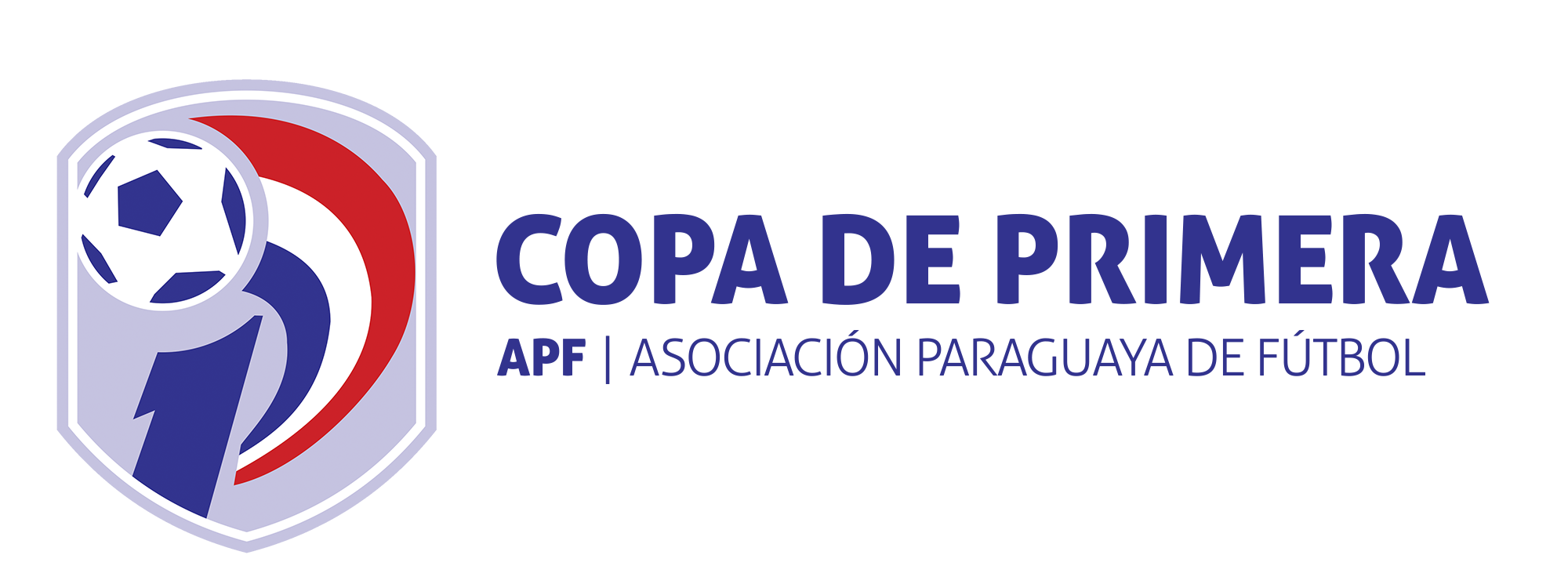
- Founded: 1906
- Country: Paraguay
- Confederation: CONMEBOL
- Number of clubs: 12
- Level on pyramid: 1
- Relegation to: División Intermedia
- Domestic cup: Copa Paraguay
- International cup(s): Copa Libertadores; Copa Sudamericana
- Current champions: Olimpia (49th title) (2026 Clausura)
- Most championships: Olimpia (49 titles)
- Top scorer: Santiago Salcedo (166 goals)
- Broadcasters: Tigo Sports & Tigo Sports Plus (Six games per matchday); Telefuturo (Only emits highlights per matchday); ESPN Brasil (only are broadcast live Sunday)
- Website: www.apf.org.py/p/division-de-honor
- Current: 2026 season

The División de Honor or División Profesional de la Asociación Paraguaya de Fútbol (locally [diβiˈsjom pɾofesjoˈnal de la asosjaˈsjom paɾaˈɣwaʝa ðe ˈfuðβol]; "Professional Division of the Paraguayan Football Association"), or due to sponsorship reasons Copa de Primera Tigo – ueno bank, is the top-flight professional football league in Paraguay. Currently, there are 12 teams in the first division.

The most successful club is Olimpia, with 49 championships. Olimpia are also the most recent champions, having won the 2026 Clausura tournament. As of 2022, IFFHS ranked the league as the 10th strongest in the world and 3rd in South America.

== History ==
Liga Paraguaya's first game was played in 1906, after the director of the El Diario newspaper, Don Adolfo Riquelme, brought to his office on 18 June 1906, the representatives of the five existing football teams in Paraguay at that time (Olimpia, Guaraní, Libertad, General Díaz, and Nacional) to create the governing body of football in Paraguay: the Liga Paraguaya de Fútbol (known today as Asociación Paraguaya de Fútbol). The representatives were William Paats and Junio Godoy (Olimpia) Ramón Caballero, Manuel Bella and Salvador Melián (Guaraní), Juan Escalada (Libertad), César Urdapilleta (General Díaz), and Vicente Gadea (Nacional). The Liga Paraguaya saw Club Guaraní as the first champion in 1906, after defeating Olimpia in the final.

The Primera División was founded in 1906 with 5 teams, and turned professional in 1935 when 10 clubs broke away from the amateur leagues to form a professional league. Since 1996 the format of tournament was changed to Torneo Apertura and Clausura, but since 2008 each tournament is independent.

Traditionally, the dominance of Olimpia and Cerro Porteño went mostly unchallenged for decades. All of this changed at the turn of the 21st century. Since then, Libertad has been the most dominant club, while Nacional and Guaraní have also experienced success at the local level.

== Format ==
The league is currently contested by 12 teams that play home and away games in a round-robin format. The league is traditionally divided into two halves: the Torneo Apertura (Opening Tournament) from February to July, and the Torneo Clausura (Closing Tournament) from July to December.

Relegation is based on an averaging system. At the end of each season, the two teams with the worst three-year averages are relegated, and the two best teams in the "División Intermedia" (second division) are promoted to Primera División.

== International cup participation ==
Results of the 'Big Five' in the last 8 seasons
Season	CCP	GUA	LIB	NAC	OLI
2018	2	8	3	4	1
2019	3	4	2	6	1
2020	1	4	3	5	2
2021	1	3	2	5	4
2022	1	5	3	4	2
2023	2	5	1	4	6
2024	3	4	2	8	1
2025	1	2	3	5	7
Top 3	8	2	8	0	5
Top 5	8	7	8	6	6
out of 6
Apertura and/or Clausura champions / Copa Libertadores group stage Copa Libertadores group stage Copa Libertadores qualifying round Copa Sudamericana qualifying round

Since 2017, Paraguay have eight slots in international cups (four in the Copa Libertadores de America and four in the Copa Sudamericana). These eight slots will be filled by eight teams.

In the Copa Libertadores, the winner of the Apertura and Clausura tournaments qualify automatically. The third (going into the second round play-off) and fourth (going into the first round play-off) representatives are the best placed non-champion teams from the accumulative table of both the Apertura and Clausura.

In the Copa Sudamericana, the 4th, 5th and 6th best placed teams from the Apertura and Clausura accumulative table qualify for the first stage, alongside the winners of the Copa Paraguay.

== Teams ==
The following are the teams in the first division for the 2026 season:

Locations of the 2026 Copa de Primera teams outside Asunción
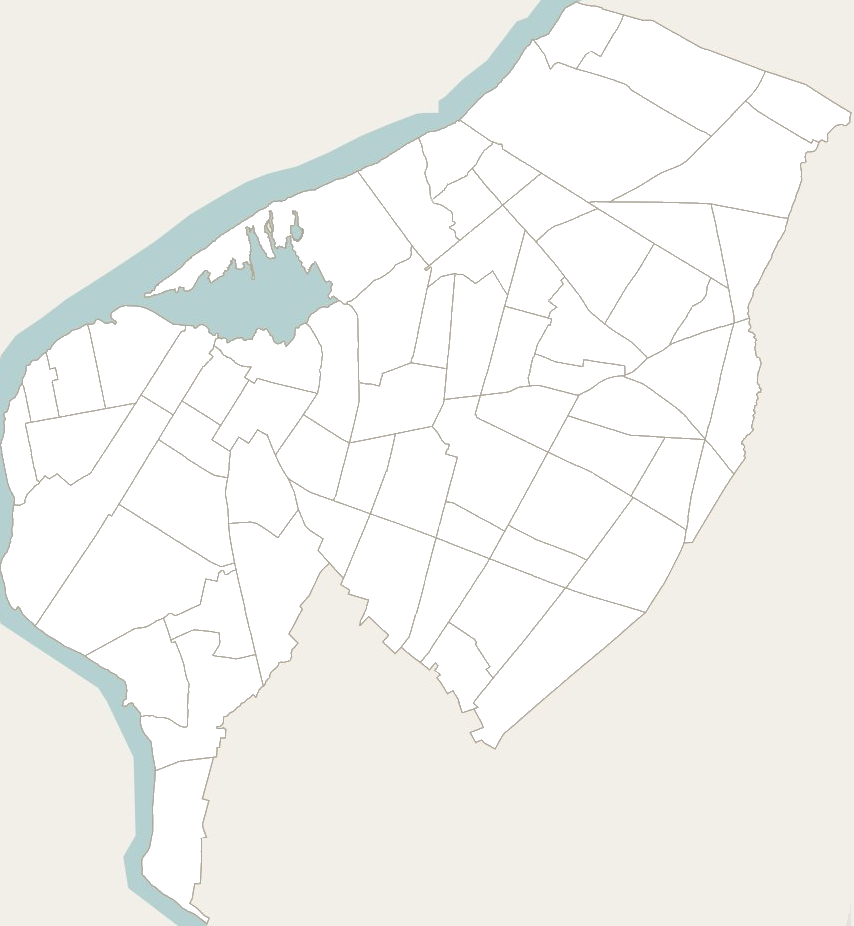
Locations of the 2026 Copa de Primera teams – Asunción

Team	City	Stadium (Note: Teams occasionally play home matches at Estadio Defensores del Chaco in Asunción.)	Capacity
2 de Mayo	Pedro Juan Caballero	Río Parapití	25,000
Cerro Porteño	Asunción	General Pablo Rojas	45,000
Guaraní	Asunción	La Arboleda (Note: Guaraní play their home matches at Estadio La Arboleda since their stadium Estadio Rogelio Livieres was closed for reconstruction.)	8,000
Libertad	Asunción	La Huerta	14,000
Nacional	Asunción	Arsenio Erico	7,500
Olimpia	Capiatá	Erico Galeano (Note: Olimpia play their home matches at Estadio Erico Galeano since their stadium Estadio Osvaldo Domínguez Dibb in Asunción was closed for reconstruction.)	13,500
Recoleta	Asunción	Ricardo Gregor (Note: Recoleta play their home matches at Estadio Ricardo Gregor since their stadium Estadio Roque Battilana did not meet APF requirements.)	4,000
Rubio Ñu	Asunción	La Arboleda	8,000
San Lorenzo	San Lorenzo	Gunther Vogel	5,000
Sportivo Ameliano	Villeta	Ameliano Villeta	7,000
Sportivo Luqueño	Itauguá	Luis Alberto Salinas (Note: Sportivo Luqueño play their home matches at Estadio Luis Alberto Salinas since their stadium Estadio Feliciano Cáceres in Luque is closed for remodeling works.)	10,000
Sportivo Trinidense	Asunción	Martín Torres	3,000

== List of champions ==
Complete list of champions since 1906. Paraguayan football turned professional since the 1935 season.

- (In bracket, title count):

Ed.	Season		Champion (title count)	Runner-up	Winning manager
1	1906		Guaraní (1)	Olimpia	(Spain) Salvador Melián
2	1907		Guaraní (2)	Olimpia	(Argentina) Manuel Bella
—	1908		No championship held		
3	1909		Nacional (1)	Libertad	
4	1910		Libertad (1)	Atlántida	
5	1911		Nacional (2)	Atlántida	
6	1912		Olimpia (1)	Sol de América	(Paraguay) Carlos Olivia
7	1913		Cerro Porteño (1)	Sol de América	(Paraguay) Dámaso Ávila
8	1914		Olimpia (2)	Cerro Porteño	(Paraguay) Ángel Hermosilla
9	1915		Cerro Porteño (2)	Olimpia	
10	1916		Olimpia (3)	Guaraní	(Paraguay) César Mena Porta
11	1917		Libertad (2)	Olimpia	
12	1918		Cerro Porteño (3)	Nacional	
13	1919		Cerro Porteño (4)	River Plate	(Paraguay) Humberto Camperchiolli
14	1920		Libertad (3)	Olimpia	
15	1921		Guaraní (3)	Nacional	(Paraguay) Idelfonso López
—	1922		No championship held		
16	1923		Guaraní (4)	Olimpia	(Paraguay) Idelfonso López
17	1924		Nacional (3)	Libertad	
18	1925		Olimpia (4)	Guaraní	(Paraguay) Axel Sirvent
19	1926		Nacional (4)	Olimpia	
20	1927		Olimpia (5)	Libertad; Nacional	(Argentina) José Durand Laguna
21	1928		Olimpia (6)	Libertad	
22	1929		Olimpia (7)	Libertad	
23	1930		Libertad (4)	River Plate	
24	1931		Olimpia (8)	Libertad	
—	1932		No championship held due to the Chaco War		
—	1933		No championship held due to the Chaco War		
—	1934		No championship held due to the Chaco War		
25	1935		Cerro Porteño (5)	Sol de América	(Paraguay) Alejandro Delgado
26	1936		Olimpia (9)	Atlántida	(Paraguay) Daniel Schaerer
27	1937		Olimpia (10)	Cerro Porteño	(Paraguay) César Mena Porta
28	1938		Olimpia (11)	Cerro Porteño	(Paraguay) Daniel Schaerer
29	1939		Cerro Porteño (6)	Olimpia	(Paraguay) Benjamín Laterza
30	1940		Cerro Porteño (7)	Sol de América	(Paraguay) Manuel Recalde
31	1941		Cerro Porteño (8)	Olimpia	(Uruguay) Athuel Velázquez
32	1942		Nacional (5)	Cerro Porteño	(Uruguay) Athuel Velázquez
33	1943		Libertad (5)	Olimpia	(Paraguay) Manuel Fleitas Solich
34	1944		Cerro Porteño (9)	Libertad	(Paraguay) Garibaldi Bougermini
35	1945		Libertad (6)	Cerro Porteño	(Paraguay) Manuel Fleitas Solich
36	1946		Nacional (6)	Sol de América	(Argentina) José Durand Laguna
37	1947		Olimpia (12)	Guaraní	(Paraguay) Antonio Brunetti
38	1948		Olimpia (13)	Cerro Porteño	(Paraguay) Antonio Brunetti
39	1949		Guaraní (5)	Nacional	(Paraguay) Fulgencio Romaro
40	1950		Cerro Porteño (10)	Libertad	(Paraguay) Pedro Osorio
41	1951		Sportivo Luqueño (1)	Cerro Porteño	(Italy) Vessilio Bártoli
42	1952		Presidente Hayes (1)	Libertad; Sol de América	(Paraguay) Luis Magín Gómez
43	1953		Sportivo Luqueño (2)	Libertad; Cerro Porteño	(Italy) Vessilio Bártoli
44	1954		Cerro Porteño (11)	Libertad	(Argentina) Gregorio Juan Esperón
45	1955		Libertad (7)	Olimpia	(Argentina) Luis Viccini
46	1956		Olimpia (14)	Libertad	(Paraguay) Aurelio González
47	1957		Olimpia (15)	Cerro Porteño; Sol de América; Guaraní	(Paraguay) Aurelio González
48	1958		Olimpia (16)	Cerro Porteño	(Paraguay) Aurelio González
49	1959		Olimpia (17)	Cerro Porteño	(Paraguay) Aurelio González
50	1960		Olimpia (18)	Cerro Porteño	(Paraguay) Aurelio González
51	1961		Cerro Porteño (12)	Olimpia	(Italy) Vessilio Bártoli
52	1962		Olimpia (19)	Nacional	(Paraguay) Miguel Ángel Pangrazio
53	1963		Cerro Porteño (13)	Olimpia	(Argentina) Mario Fortunato
54	1964		Guaraní (6)	Nacional; Cerro Porteño	(Uruguay) Ondino Viera
55	1965		Olimpia (20)	Guaraní	(Paraguay) Aurelio González
56	1966		Cerro Porteño (14)	Guaraní	(Argentina) Mario Fortunato
57	1967		Guaraní (7)	Libertad	(Uruguay) José María Rodríguez
58	1968		Olimpia (21)	Cerro Porteño	(Brazil) Marcos Pavlovsky
59	1969		Guaraní (8)	Olimpia	(Uruguay) José María Rodríguez
60	1970		Cerro Porteño (15)	Guaraní	(Brazil) Marcos Pavlovsky
61	1971		Olimpia (22)	Cerro Porteño	(Uruguay) José María Rodríguez
62	1972		Cerro Porteño (16)	Olimpia	(Brazil) Marcos Pavlovsky
63	1973		Cerro Porteño (17)	Olimpia	(Paraguay) Salvador Breglia
64	1974		Cerro Porteño (18)	Olimpia	(Brazil) (Paraguay) Egidio Landolfi
65	1975		Olimpia (23)	Sportivo Luqueño	(Paraguay) Aurelio González
66	1976		Libertad (8)	Cerro Porteño	(Uruguay) Ramón Rodríguez
67	1977		Cerro Porteño (19)	Libertad	(Paraguay) Salvador Breglia
68	1978		Olimpia (24)	Sol de América	(Paraguay) Carlos Sanabria
69	1979		Olimpia (25)	Sol de América	(Uruguay) Luis Cubilla
70	1980		Olimpia (26)	Cerro Porteño	(Uruguay) José Sasía
71	1981		Olimpia (27)	Sol de América	(Paraguay) Roque Fernández
72	1982		Olimpia (28)	Nacional	(Uruguay) Luis Cubilla
73	1983		Olimpia (29)	Sportivo Luqueño	(Uruguay) Sergio Markarian
74	1984		Guaraní (9)	Cerro Porteño	(Paraguay) Cayetano Ré
75	1985		Olimpia (30)	Nacional	(Uruguay) Aníbal Ruiz
76	1986		Sol de América (1)	Olimpia	(Paraguay) Silvio Parodi
77	1987		Cerro Porteño (20)	Olimpia	(Brazil) Valdir Espinosa
78	1988		Olimpia (31)	Sol de América	(Uruguay) Luis Cubilla
79	1989		Olimpia (32)	Guaraní	(Uruguay) Luis Cubilla
80	1990		Cerro Porteño (21)	Libertad	(Uruguay) Sergio Markarian
81	1991		Sol de América (2)	Cerro Porteño	(Argentina) Héctor Corte
82	1992		Cerro Porteño (22)	Libertad	(Brazil) Valdir Espinosa
83	1993		Olimpia (33)	Cerro Porteño	(Paraguay) Ever Almeida
84	1994		Cerro Porteño (23)	Olimpia	(Paraguay) Gerardo González Aquino
85	1995		Olimpia (34)	Cerro Porteño	(Uruguay) Luis Cubilla
86	1996		Cerro Porteño (24)	Guaraní	(Paraguay) Carlos Kiese
87	1997		Olimpia (35)	Cerro Porteño	(Uruguay) Luis Cubilla
88	1998		Olimpia (36)	Cerro Porteño	(Uruguay) Luis Cubilla
89	1999		Olimpia (37)	Cerro Porteño	(Uruguay) Luis Cubilla
90	2000		Olimpia (38)	Guaraní	(Paraguay) Alicio Solalinde
91	2001		Cerro Porteño (25)	Sportivo Luqueño	(Paraguay) Mario César Jacquet
92	2002		Libertad (9)	12 de Octubre	(Argentina) Gerardo Martino
93	2003		Libertad (10)	Guaraní	(Paraguay) Víctor Genes
94	2004		Cerro Porteño (26)	Libertad	(Argentina) Gerardo Martino
95	2005		Cerro Porteño (27)	Libertad	(Argentina) Gustavo Costas
96	2006		Libertad (11)	Cerro Porteño	(Argentina) Gerardo Martino
97	2007		Libertad (12)	Sportivo Luqueño	(Uruguay) Rubén Israel
98	2008	Apertura	Libertad (13)	Nacional	(Uruguay) Rubén Israel
99	2008	Clausura	Libertad (14)	Guaraní	(Uruguay) Rubén Israel
100	2009	Apertura	Cerro Porteño (28)	Libertad	(Argentina) Pedro Troglio
101	2009	Clausura	Nacional (7)	Libertad	(Paraguay) Ever Hugo Almeida
102	2010	Apertura	Guaraní (10)	Cerro Porteño	(Paraguay) Félix Darío León
103	2010	Clausura	Libertad (15)	Cerro Porteño	(Uruguay) Gregorio Pérez
104	2011	Apertura	Nacional (8)	Olimpia	(Paraguay) Juan Battaglia
105	2011	Clausura	Olimpia (39)	Cerro Porteño	(Uruguay) Gerardo Pelusso
106	2012	Apertura	Cerro Porteño (29)	Olimpia	(Uruguay) Jorge Fossati
107	2012	Clausura	Libertad (16)	Nacional	(Uruguay) Rubén Israel
108	2013	Apertura	Nacional (9)	Guaraní	(Paraguay) Gustavo Morínigo
109	2013	Clausura	Cerro Porteño (30)	Libertad	(Paraguay) Francisco Arce
110	2014	Apertura	Libertad (17)	Guaraní	(Paraguay) Pedro Sarabia
111	2014	Clausura	Libertad (18)	Cerro Porteño	(Paraguay) Pedro Sarabia
112	2015	Apertura	Cerro Porteño (31)	Guaraní	(Paraguay) Roberto Torres
113	2015	Clausura	Olimpia (40)	Cerro Porteño	(Paraguay) Francisco Arce
114	2016	Apertura	Libertad (19)	Olimpia	(Paraguay) Roberto Torres
115	2016	Clausura	Guaraní (11)	Olimpia	(Argentina) Daniel Garnero
116	2017	Apertura	Libertad (20)	Guaraní	(Spain) Fernando Jubero
117	2017	Clausura	Cerro Porteño (32)	Olimpia	(Colombia) Leonel Álvarez
118	2018	Apertura	Olimpia (41)	Cerro Porteño	(Argentina) Daniel Garnero
119	2018	Clausura	Olimpia (42)	Cerro Porteño	(Argentina) Daniel Garnero
120	2019	Apertura	Olimpia (43)	Cerro Porteño	(Argentina) Daniel Garnero
121	2019	Clausura	Olimpia (44)	Libertad	(Argentina) Daniel Garnero
122	2020	Apertura	Cerro Porteño (33)	Olimpia	(Paraguay) Francisco Arce
123	2020	Clausura	Olimpia (45)	Guaraní	(Argentina) Néstor Gorosito
124	2021	Apertura	Libertad (21)	Olimpia	(Argentina) Daniel Garnero
125	2021	Clausura	Cerro Porteño (34)	Guaraní	(Paraguay) Francisco Arce
126	2022	Apertura	Libertad (22)	Cerro Porteño	(Argentina) Daniel Garnero
127	2022	Clausura	Olimpia (46)	Cerro Porteño	(Paraguay) Julio César Cáceres
128	2023	Apertura	Libertad (23)	Cerro Porteño	(Argentina) Daniel Garnero
129	2023	Clausura	Libertad (24)	Cerro Porteño	(Paraguay) Ariel Galeano
130	2024	Apertura	Libertad (25)	Cerro Porteño	(Paraguay) Ariel Galeano
131	2024	Clausura	Olimpia (47)	Guaraní	(Argentina) Martín Palermo
132	2025	Apertura	Libertad (26)	Cerro Porteño	(Paraguay) Sergio Aquino
133	2025	Clausura	Cerro Porteño (35)	Guaraní	(Uruguay) Jorge Bava
134	2026	Apertura	Olimpia (48)	Nacional	(Argentina) Pablo Sánchez
135	2026	Clausura	Olimpia (49)		(Argentina) Pablo Sánchez

== Titles by club ==
- Teams in **bold** compete in the Primera División as of the 2026 season.
- Italics indicates clubs that no longer exist or disaffiliated from the APF.

Rank	Club	Winners	Runners-up	Winning years	Runners-up years
1	**Olimpia**	49	27	1912, 1914, 1916, 1925, 1927, 1928, 1929, 1931, 1936, 1937, 1938, 1947, 1948, 1956, 1957, 1958, 1959, 1960, 1962, 1965, 1968, 1971, 1975, 1978, 1979, 1980, 1981, 1982, 1983, 1985, 1988, 1989, 1993, 1995, 1997, 1998, 1999, 2000, 2011 Clausura, 2015 Clausura, 2018 Apertura, 2018 Clausura, 2019 Apertura, 2019 Clausura, 2020 Clausura, 2022 Clausura, 2024 Clausura, 2026 Apertura, 2026 Clausura	1906, 1907, 1915, 1917, 1920, 1923, 1926, 1939, 1941, 1943, 1955, 1961, 1963, 1969, 1972, 1973, 1974, 1986, 1987, 1994, 2011 Apertura, 2012 Apertura, 2016 Apertura, 2016 Clausura, 2017 Clausura, 2020 Apertura, 2021 Apertura
2	**Cerro Porteño**	35	39	1913, 1915, 1918, 1919, 1935, 1939, 1940, 1941, 1944, 1950, 1954, 1961, 1963, 1966, 1970, 1972, 1973, 1974, 1977, 1987, 1990, 1992, 1994, 1996, 2001, 2004, 2005, 2009 Apertura, 2012 Apertura, 2013 Clausura, 2015 Apertura, 2017 Clausura, 2020 Apertura, 2021 Clausura, 2025 Clausura	1914, 1937, 1938, 1942, 1945, 1948, 1951, 1953, 1957, 1958, 1959, 1960, 1964, 1968, 1971, 1976, 1980, 1984, 1991, 1993, 1995, 1997, 1998, 1999, 2006, 2010 Apertura, 2010 Clausura, 2011 Clausura, 2014 Clausura, 2015 Clausura, 2018 Apertura, 2018 Clausura, 2019 Apertura, 2022 Apertura, 2022 Clausura, 2023 Apertura, 2023 Clausura, 2024 Apertura, 2025 Apertura
3	**Libertad**	26	22	1910, 1917, 1920, 1930, 1943, 1945, 1955, 1976, 2002, 2003, 2006, 2007, 2008 Apertura, 2008 Clausura, 2010 Clausura, 2012 Clausura, 2014 Apertura, 2014 Clausura, 2016 Apertura, 2017 Apertura, 2021 Apertura, 2022 Apertura, 2023 Apertura, 2023 Clausura, 2024 Apertura, 2025 Apertura	1909, 1924, 1927, 1928, 1929, 1931, 1944, 1950, 1952, 1953, 1954, 1956, 1967, 1977, 1990, 1992, 2004, 2005, 2009 Apertura, 2009 Clausura, 2013 Clausura, 2019 Clausura
4	**Guaraní**	11	20	1906, 1907, 1921, 1923, 1949, 1964, 1967, 1969, 1984, 2010 Apertura, 2016 Clausura	1916, 1925, 1947, 1957, 1965, 1966, 1970, 1989, 1996, 2000, 2003, 2008 Clausura, 2013 Apertura, 2014 Apertura, 2015 Apertura, 2017 Apertura, 2020 Clausura, 2021 Clausura, 2024 Clausura, 2025 Clausura
5	**Nacional**	9	11	1909, 1911, 1924, 1926, 1942, 1946, 2009 Clausura, 2011 Apertura, 2013 Apertura	1918, 1921, 1927, 1949, 1962, 1964, 1982, 1985, 2008 Apertura, 2012 Clausura, 2026 Apertura
6	Sol de América	2	11	1986, 1991	1912, 1913, 1935, 1940, 1946, 1952, 1957, 1978, 1979, 1981, 1988
7	**Sportivo Luqueño**	2	4	1951, 1953	1975, 1983, 2001, 2007
8	Presidente Hayes	1	—	1952	—

== Sponsors ==
=== Main sponsors ===
- Pepsi (1997-1998)
- Brahma (1997-1998)
- Lloyds TSB (1998-1999)
- Banco del Paraná (2000 only)
- Gillette (2005-2007)
- Tigo (2008-present)
- Visión Banco (2010-2024)
- Ueno Bank (2024-present)
- Aposta.LA (2025-present)

=== Current official sponsors ===
- Coca-Cola (1987-2004/2011-present)
- Pilsen (1988-2007/2011-present)
- Caña Fortin
- Vino Toro
- Lácteos Trébol
- Lácteos Lactolanda
- Pastas Anita
- Supermercado Superseis
- Supermercado La Bomba
- Supermercado Arete
- Supermercados Kingo
- Bein TV (1999-present)
- DirecTV (1999-present)
- GOL TV (2003-presente)

=== Former official sponsors ===
- Daewoo Motor
- Suzuki Motor
- Pirelli
- Pulp (2005-2010)
- Pepsi (1994-1999)
- Brahma (1995-1999)
- Budweiser (2007-2008)
- Multicanal (1996-2006)
- Nuevo Siglo Cable TV (1996-2007)
- SKY (2000-2004)
- Supermercado Real
- Supermercado Gran Vía
- Supermercado Ycua Bolaños
- Shopping Multiplaza
- González Giménez

== See also ==
- Football in Paraguay
- Paraguayan football league system
- División Intermedia
- Paraguayan Tercera División
- Paraguayan Primera División B
- Primera División B Nacional
- Paraguayan Cuarta División
- Campeonato Nacional de Interligas
- Unión del Fútbol del Interior
- Paraguayan women's football championship
- Football Federation of the 1st Department Concepción
- Football Federation of the 2nd Department San Pedro
- Football Federation of the 3rd Department Cordillera
- Football Federation of the 4th Department Guairá
- Football Federation of the 5th Department Caaguazú
- Football Federation of the 6th Department Caazapá
- Football Federation of the 7th Department Itapúa
- Football Federation of the 8th Department Misiones
- Football Federation of the 9th Department Paraguarí
- Football Federation of the 10th Department Alto Paraná
- Football Federation of the 11th Department Central
- Football Federation of the 12th Department Ñeembucú
- Football Federation of the 13th Department Amambay
- Football Federation of the 14th Department Canindeyú
- Football Federation of the 15th Department Presidente Hayes
- Football Federation of the 16th Department Alto Paraguay
- Football Federation of the 17th Department Boquerón
