= Club Atlético Corrales =

Atlético Corrales
- Full name: Club Atlético Corrales
- Founded: 1919
- Dissolved: 1949
- Ground: Estadio Atlético Corrales
Home colours	Away colours

Club Atlético Corrales, usually known simply as Atlético Corrales was an association football club based in Asunción, Paraguay. It was founded in 1919 and dissolved in 1949.

== History ==
The club was founded in 1919 by employees of the "Compañia Americana de Luz y Tracción" (American Company of Light and Traction) which was a private company in charge of the power/electricity distribution and tramway services in Paraguay. The club was soon financed by the company and started participating in the lower divisions of the Paraguayan league. The team got promoted to the 1st division in 1929 after winning the Intermedia (second division) tournament and remained in the top-flight until 1941. The team played under the name of C.A.L.T. (the initials of the company) but later on changed its name to "Atlético Corrales" in 1935 since the Paraguayan FA decided to prohibit the use of a company name for a club. In 1949, the government opted to nationalize the electricity services and thus the private company C.A.L.T. came to an end and so did Atlético Corrales.

Its stadium, which was considered among the most modern at the time in Paraguay, was bought by the Paraguayan Army and today is known as the "Escuela de Educación Fisica de las Fuerzas Armadas" (Physical Education School of the Army).

== The Latin American tour ==
In 1939, Atlético Corrales was given permission by the Paraguayan FA to miss that year's tournament and embark on a Latin American tour that remains until this date the longest by any Paraguayan team. The tour lasted 1 year and 15 days (from 4 April 1939 to 19 April 1940), and the club participated in exhibition games in Argentina, Chile, Cuba, Mexico, El Salvador, Costa Rica, Colombia, Dutch Antilles, Suriname, Venezuela and Ecuador. Atlético Corrales was well prepared for the tour after having a good performance in the 1938 Paraguayan 1st division tournament, and on top of the good squad they had before the trip they added and signed a few players along their visit to other countries such as Lino Taioli and Alejandro Mariscotti (from Argentina), Luis de la Fuente (Mexico) and Ceballos (Ecuador). The signings were made possible thanks to the wealth of the board directors from the club and the C.A.L.T. company. The tour was a success, with the team winning several friendly tournaments and games, and also selling some players along the way.

=== Stats from the tour ===
- Countries visited: 11 (Argentina, Chile, Cuba, Mexico, El Salvador, Costa Rica, Colombia, Dutch Antilles, Suriname, Venezuela, and Ecuador).
- Topscorer: Alberto Casco (more than 40 goals scored).

Games	Wins	Draws	Losses	Goals scored	Goals against
53	30	9	14	159	121

== Honours ==
- Paraguayan Second Division: 1

1929
