= Club Atlético Colegiales (Paraguay) =

Paraguayan football club

- Full name: Club Atlético Colegiales
- Nickname: Los Colegiantes
- Founded: January 7, 1977; 49 years ago
- Ground: Estadio Luciano Zacarías; Lambaré, Paraguay
- Capacity: 4,500
- Chairman: Emilio Zacarías
- Manager: Alejandro Nania
- League: Primera División B Metropolitana
- 2024: División Intermedia, 16th of 16 (relegated by average)
Home colours	Away colours

Club Atlético Colegiales, known as Atlético Colegiales or simply Colegiales, is a football club from the Cuatro Mojones neighborhood in Lambaré, Paraguay. It was founded in 1977 by the Zacarías family. The team currently plays in Primera División B Metropolitana, one of the third tier leagues in the Paraguayan football league system, following its relegation from División Intermedia at the end of the 2024 season.

== History ==
The Zacarías family named the team "Colegiales" (which basically means "students") after their chain of bookstores called "El Colegio" (The College). The team entered the first division in 1982. Colegiales never won a national title in the Liga Paraguaya, however, the few times they have participated in international tournaments they did a good job despite being a very small team from a humble neighbourhood with limited finances. Colegiales best effort was in 1995 when they reached the Copa CONMEBOL semifinals. They have two participations in the Copa Libertadores. In 1991, they qualified for the second round, and in 2000, they could not get past the group stage. Colegiales has been coached by Juan Desiderio Zacarías for over 21 years.

== Notable players ==
To appear in this section a player must have either:

- Played at least 125 games for the club.
- Set a club record or won an individual award while at the club.
- Been part of a national team at any time.
- Played in the first division of any other football association (outside of Paraguay).
- Played in a continental and/or intercontinental competition.

- (Paraguay) Delio Toledo (1995–1997)
- (Paraguay) Edgar Denis (2000–2001)

Non-CONMEBOL players

- (Cameroon) Tobie Mimboe

== Honours ==
=== National ===
- Torneo República
  - Winners (1): 1990
- División Intermedia
  - Winners (1): 1982
- Paraguayan Tercera División
  - Winners (3): 1979, 2008, 2021

== Performance in CONMEBOL competitions ==
- Copa Libertadores: 2 appearances

Best: Second Round in 1991
1991: Second Round
