= Club Sportivo San Lorenzo =

Association football club in Paraguay

Coordinates: 25°20′34″S 57°30′03″W

San Lorenzo
- Full name: Club Sportivo San Lorenzo
- Nickname: Rayadito
- Founded: April 17, 1930; 96 years ago
- Ground: Estadio Gunther Vogel
- Capacity: 5,000
- Chairman: Ramón Antonio Delgado
- Manager: Sergio Órteman
- League: Primera División
- 2025: División Intermedia, 2nd of 16 (promoted)
Home colours	Away colours

Club Sportivo San Lorenzo, is a Paraguayan football club based in the city of San Lorenzo. It was founded April 17, 1930, and plays in División Intermedia, the second division in the Paraguayan football league system, after suffering relegation in the 2020 Primera División season.

Their home games are played at the Estadio Gunther Vogel, which has a capacity of approximately 5,000 seats.

== History ==
The club was founded on April 17, 1930, originally named Tacuary Sport. During November the same year, the club changed its name to Sportivo Villa Cálcena.

After Chaco War on 16 August 1936, the club's name was changed again to "Sportivo San Lorenzo".

Joined to Paraguayan Football Association in 1949, the club's first year in a Paraguayan Football Association competition, won the Paraguayan Second Division and were promoted to the Paraguayan First Division for the first time in their history.

The club again won the second division several years 1953, 1960, 1984, 1987, 1994.

The club was relegated to the Third Division in 2004 for the first time in their history.

In 2009 won the Third Division and was promoted to the Paraguayan Second Division.

Sportivo San Lorenzo become the champions of the 2014 Second Division Championship and gets the promotion to the First Division, highest category of Paraguayan football after an 11-year absence.

In 2015 the club was relegated to Second Division.

In 2016 the club was relegated to Third Division.

In 2017 the club become the champions of Third Division and was promoted to Second Division.

In 2018 the club took second place of Second Division and was promoted to First Division.

== Honours ==
- Second Division: 7

1949, 1953, 1960, 1984, 1987, 1994, 2014

- Third Division: 2

2009, 2017

== Performance in CONMEBOL competitions ==
- Copa CONMEBOL: 1 appearance

1999: First Round

== Current roster ==
As of March 2021.

Note: Flags indicate national team as defined under FIFA eligibility rules; some limited exceptions apply. Players may hold more than one non-FIFA nationality.

No.	Pos.	Nation	Player
—		PAR	Santiago Salcedo
—		PAR	Sergio Vergara
—		PAR	Miguel Godoy

== Notable players ==
To appear in this section a player must have either:

- Played at least 125 games for the club.
- Set a club record or won an individual award while at the club.
- Been part of a national team at any time.
- Played in the first division of any other football association (outside of Paraguay).
- Played in a continental and/or intercontinental competition.

1980's

- (Paraguay) Secundino Aifuch (1983–84, 1986)

1990's

- (Paraguay) Pedro Benítez (1998–1999)
- (Paraguay) Osvaldo Mendoza (1998–2001)

2000's

- (Paraguay) Edgar Robles (2000, 2013)
- (Paraguay) Fabio Escobar (2002)
- (Paraguay) Cristian Riveros (2005)
- (Paraguay) Sílvio Escobar (2007)
- (Paraguay) Víctor Aquino (2007)

2010's

- (Brazil) Glacinei Martins (2010–2011)
- (Paraguay) Mudo Valdez (2016–2019)

Non-CONMEBOL players

- (United States) Bryan Lopez (2014)
- (France) Vincent Ramaël (2016)
