= 1979 Copa América final =

- Event: 1979 Copa América
Paraguay	Chile
- 2–2 on points; a play-off on neutral ground was required to determine the winner. After the play-off finished tied, Paraguay won 3–1 on aggregate goals.

First leg
Paraguay	Chile
3	0
- Date: 28 November 1979
- Venue: Defensores del Chaco, Asunción
- Referee: Luis Gregorio da Rosa (Uruguay)
- Attendance: 36,700

Second leg
Chile	Paraguay
1	0
- Date: 5 December 1979
- Venue: Estadio Nacional, Santiago
- Referee: Barreto (Uruguay)
- Attendance: 51,200

Play-off
Chile	Paraguay
0	0
- After extra time
- Date: 11 December 1979
- Venue: José Amalfitani, Buenos Aires
- Referee: Arnaldo Coelho (Brazil)
- Attendance: 30,000

The 1979 Copa América final were the final series to determine the champion of the 1979 Copa América, the 31st edition of the continental competition.

The final was played as a two-legged tie, with the team earning more points being the champion. After Paraguay and Chile won one game each finished tied on points, a play-off at a neutral venue was required.

The first leg was held on November 28 at Defensores del Chaco in Asunción, where Paraguay won 3–0. The second leg was held at Estadio Nacional in Santiago on December 5, where Chile won 1–0.

As both teams were tied 2–2 on points, a play-off match was held on December 11 in Vélez Sarsfield's venue, José Amalfitani Stadium in Buenos Aires.

After the play-off match finished in a 0–0 tie after extra time had expired, Paraguay were declared champions on aggregate (3–1), therefore winning its second Copa América title.

Paraguay won the competition in the same year that a club from the country, Olimpia, won its first Copa Libertadores. A number of Olimpia players formed the basis of the national team that won the Copa América title, including Alicio Solalinde, Hugo Talavera, Roberto Paredes, Evaristo Isasi and Carlos Kiese.

== Qualified teams ==
Team	Previous final app.
Paraguay	1922, 1949, **1953**
Chile	(None)

Bold indicates winning years

== Venues ==
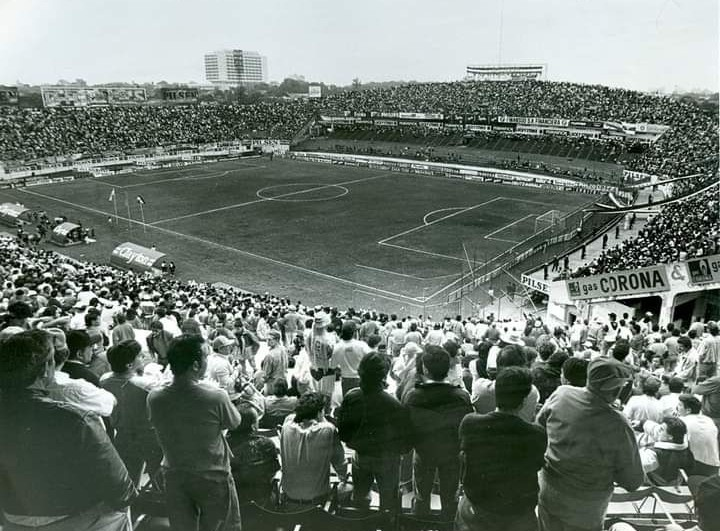
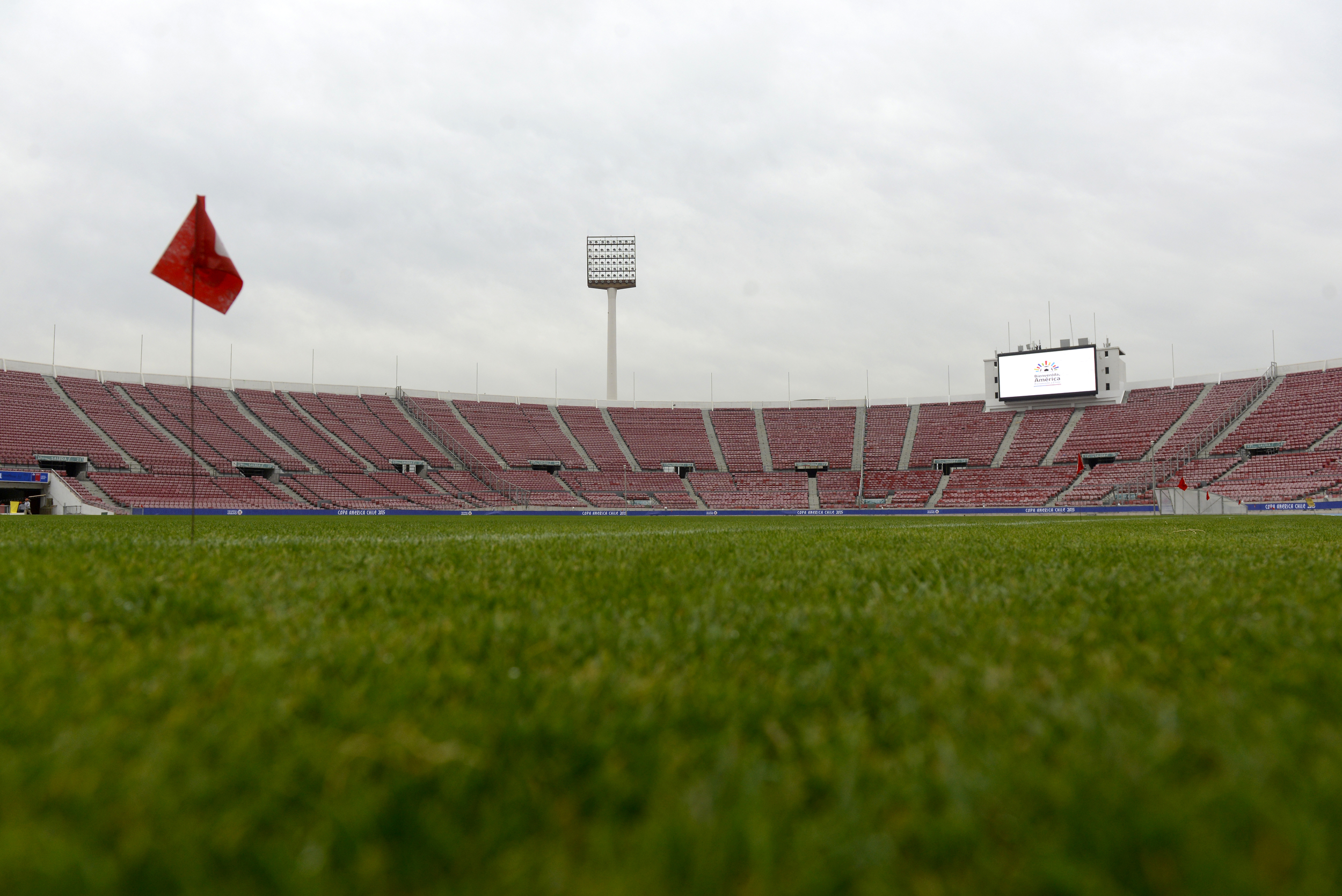
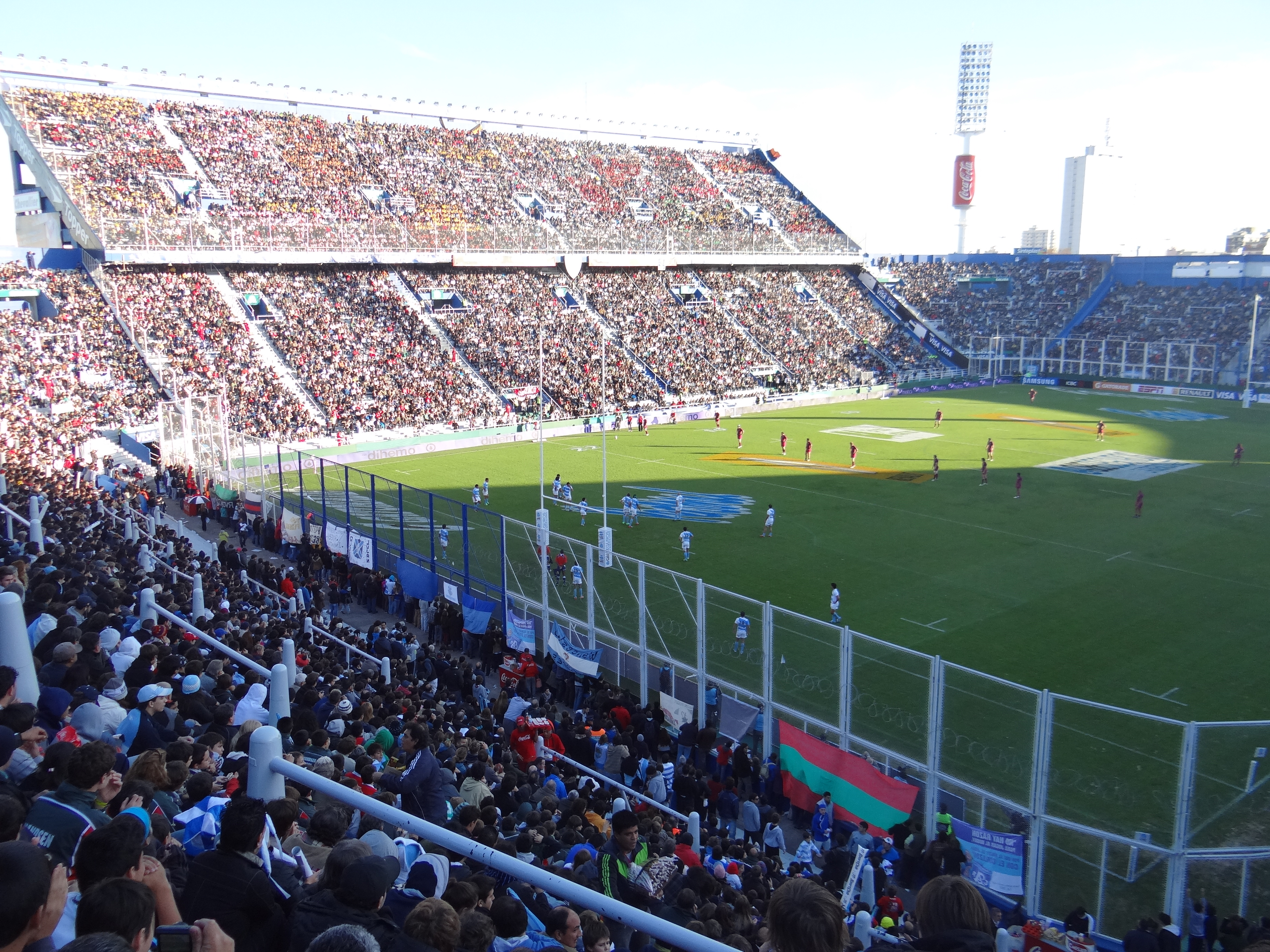
Defensores del Chaco (Asunción), Estadio Nacional (Santiago) and José Amalfitani (Buenos Aires), venues for the finals

== Route to the final ==
Paraguay
Round
Chile
Opponent
Result
Group stage
Opponent
Result
Ecuador
2–1
Match 1
Venezuela
1–1

Ecuador
2–0
Match 2
Colombia
0–1

Uruguay
0–0
Match 3
Venezuela
7–0

Uruguay
2–2
Match 4
Colombia
2–0

Team	Pld	W	D	L	GF	GA	GD	Pts
Paraguay	4	2	2	0	6	3	+3	**6**
Uruguay	4	1	2	1	5	5	0	**4**
Ecuador	4	1	0	3	4	7	−3	**2**

Final standings

Team	Pld	W	D	L	GF	GA	GD	Pts
Chile	4	2	1	1	10	2	+8	**5**
Colombia	4	2	1	1	5	2	+3	**5**
Venezuela	4	0	2	2	1	12	−11	**2**

Opponent
Result
Knockout stage
Opponent
Result
Brazil
2–1
Semi-finals
Peru
2–1
Brazil
2–2
Semi-finals
Peru
0–0

Notes

- Paraguay won 4–3 on aggregate
- Chile won 2–1 on aggregate

== Match details ==
=== First leg ===
1979 Copa América Finals
November 28, 1979
First leg

Paraguay	3–0	Chile
Romerito 12', 85'; M. Morel 36'

Defensores del Chaco, Asunción
Attendance: 36,700
Referee: Luis Gregorio da Rosa (Uruguay)

**Paraguay**	**Chile**

GK	1	Roberto Fernández
RB	2	Juan Espínola
CB	3	Roberto Paredes	(substituted off) 79'
CB	4	Flaminio Sosa
LB	5	Juan Torales
CM	6	Luis Ernesto Torres	(substituted off) 62'
CM	7	Carlos Kiese
CM	8	Romerito
RW	9	Evaristo Isasi
CF	10	Milcíades Morel
LW	11	Eugenio Morel
Substitutions:
MF		Aldo Florentín	(substituted on) 62'
DF		Cristín Cibils	(substituted on) 79'
Manager:
Ranulfo Miranda

GK	**1**	Mario Osbén
RB		Mario Galindo
CB		René Valenzuela
CB		Alberto Quintano
LB		Enzo Escobar
RM		Carlos Rivas
CM		Mario Soto
CM		Eduardo Bonvallet	(substituted off) 46'
LM		Manuel Rojas
CF		Carlos Caszely
CF		Oscar Fabbiani
Substitutions:
MF		Víctor Estay	(substituted on) 46'
Manager:
Luis Santibáñez

=== Second leg ===
December 5, 1979
Second leg

Chile	1–0	Paraguay
Rivas 10'

Estadio Nacional, Santiago
Attendance: 51,200
Referee: Ramón Barreto (Uruguay)

**Chile**	**Paraguay**

GK	1	Mario Osbén
RB	10	Mario Galindo
CB	8	René Valenzuela
CB	16	Elías Figueroa
LB	11	Enzo Escobar		(yellow card) 20'
RM	17	Carlos Rivas
CM	24	Manuel Rojas	(substituted off) 85'
CM	14	Eduardo Bonvallet		(red card) 17'
LM	22	Oscar Fabbiani	(substituted off) 56'
CF	21	Carlos Caszely
CF	23	Leonardo Véliz
Substitutions:
FW	19	Víctor Estay	(substituted on) 56'
MF	20	Miguel Neira	(substituted on) 85'
Manager:
Luis Santibáñez

GK	12	Roberto Fernández
RB	4	Alicio Solalinde		(yellow card) 15'
CB	16	Roberto Paredes		(yellow card) 55'
CB	21	Flaminio Sosa
LB	7	Juan Torales
CM	8	Romerito
CM	11	Carlos Kiese	(substituted off) 46'	(yellow card) 12'
CM	14	Hugo Talavera	(substituted off) 80'
RW	19	Evaristo Isasi
CF	9	Milcíades Morel
LW	17	Eugenio Morel		(red card) 17'
Substitutions:
MF	10	Aldo Florentín	(substituted on) 46'
MF		Roberto Cabañas	(substituted on) 80'
Manager:
Ranulfo Miranda

=== Play-off ===
December 11, 1979
Play-off

Paraguay	0–0 (a.e.t.)	Chile

José Amalfitani Stadium, Buenos Aires
Attendance: 30,000
Referee: Arnaldo Cézar Coelho (Brazil)

**Paraguay**	**Chile**

GK	12	Roberto Fernández
RB	6	Juan Espínola
CB	21	Roberto Paredes
CB	4	Flaminio Sosa
LB	7	Juan Torales
CM	10	Aldo Florentín
CM	11	Carlos Kiese
CM	8	Romerito
RW	22	Amado Pérez	(substituted off) 85'
CF	14	Milcíades Morel
LW	17	Osvaldo Aquino	(substituted off) 61'
Substitutions:
MF		Luis Ernesto Torres	(substituted on) 61'
DF		Cristín Cibils	(substituted on) 85'
Manager:
Ranulfo Miranda

GK	1	Mario Osbén
RB	10	Mario Galindo
CB	8	René Valenzuela
CB	16	Elías Figueroa
LB	11	Enzo Escobar
CM	17	Carlos Rivas
CM	13	Rodolfo Dubó	(substituted off) 90'
CM	24	Manuel Rojas
RW	23	Leonardo Véliz
CF	21	Carlos Caszely
LW	22	Oscar Fabbiani	(substituted off) 61'
Substitutions:
FW	15	Patricio Yáñez	(substituted on) 61'
MF	19	Víctor Estay	(substituted on) 90'
Manager:
Luis Santibáñez

Paraguay won 3–1 on aggregate
