= 1979 Copa Interamericana =

- Event: Copa Interamericana
FAS	Olimpia
(El Salvador)	(Paraguay)
3	8
- (Olimpia won 3–1 on points)

First leg
FAS	Olimpia
3	3
- Date: February 17, 1980
- Venue: Estadio Cuscatlán, San Salvador
- Referee: Carlos Alfaro (Costa Rica)
- Attendance: 30,000

Second leg
Olimpia	FAS
5	0
- Date: March 16, 1980
- Venue: Defensores del Chaco, Asunción
- Man of the Match: Miguel Michelagnoli
- Referee: Edison Pérez (Peru)
- Attendance: 18,500

The 1979 Copa Interamericana was the 7th. edition of the Copa Interamericana. The final was contested by Paraguayan Club Olimpia (champion of 1979 Copa Libertadores) and Salvadoran club FAS (winner of 1979 CONCACAF Champions' Cup). The final was played under a two-leg format in February–March 1980.

The first leg was held in Estadio Cuscatlán in San Salvador, where both teams tied 3–3. The second leg was played at Estadio Defensores del Chaco in Asunción, where Olimpia easily defeat FAS with a conclusive 5–0. Thus, the Paraguayan side won their first Copa Interamericana trophy.

== Qualified teams ==
Team	Qualification	Previous app.
(Paraguay) Olimpia	1979 Copa Libertadores winner	(None)
(El Salvador) FAS	1979 CONCACAF Champions' Cup winner	(None)

== Venues ==
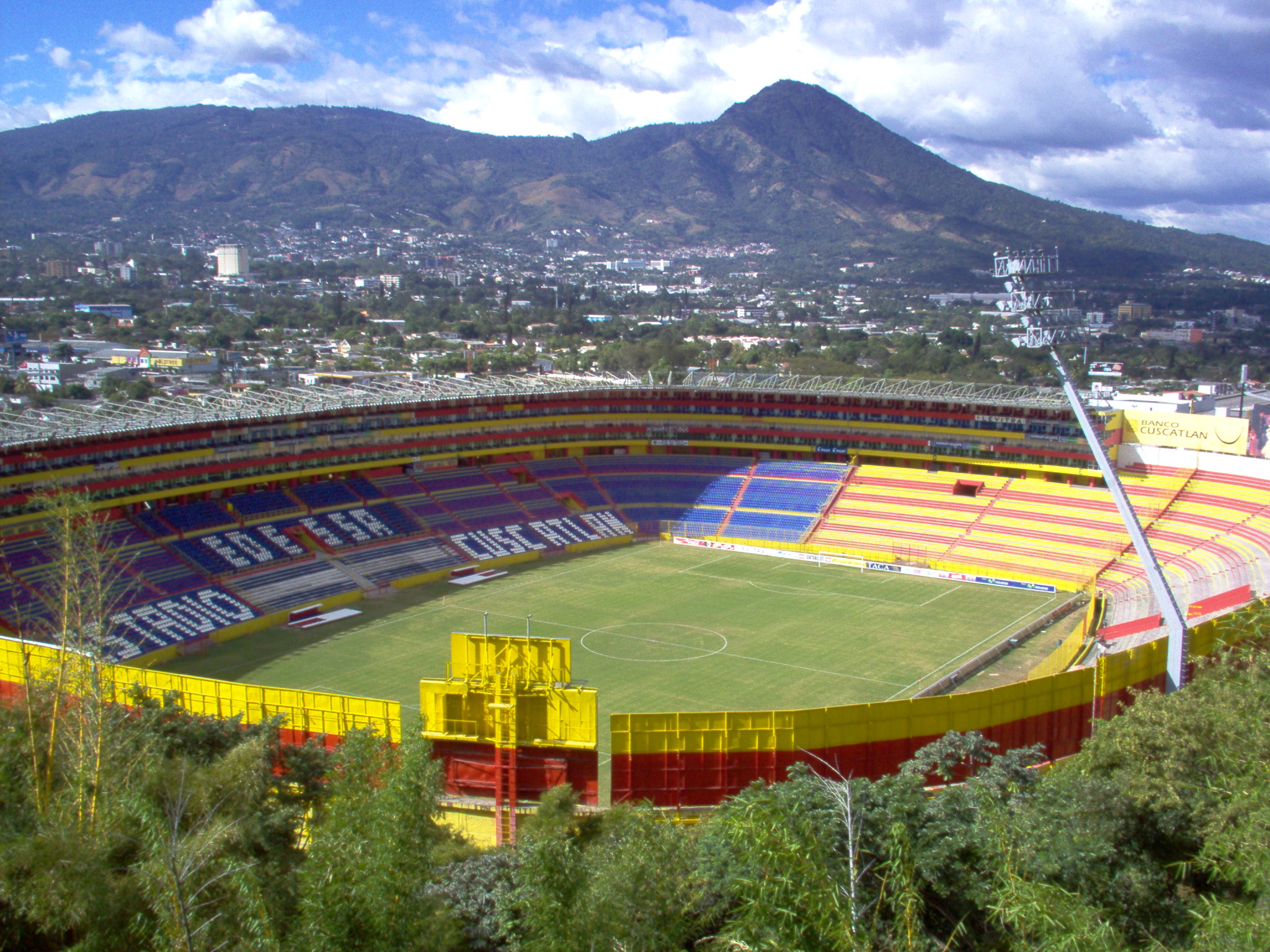
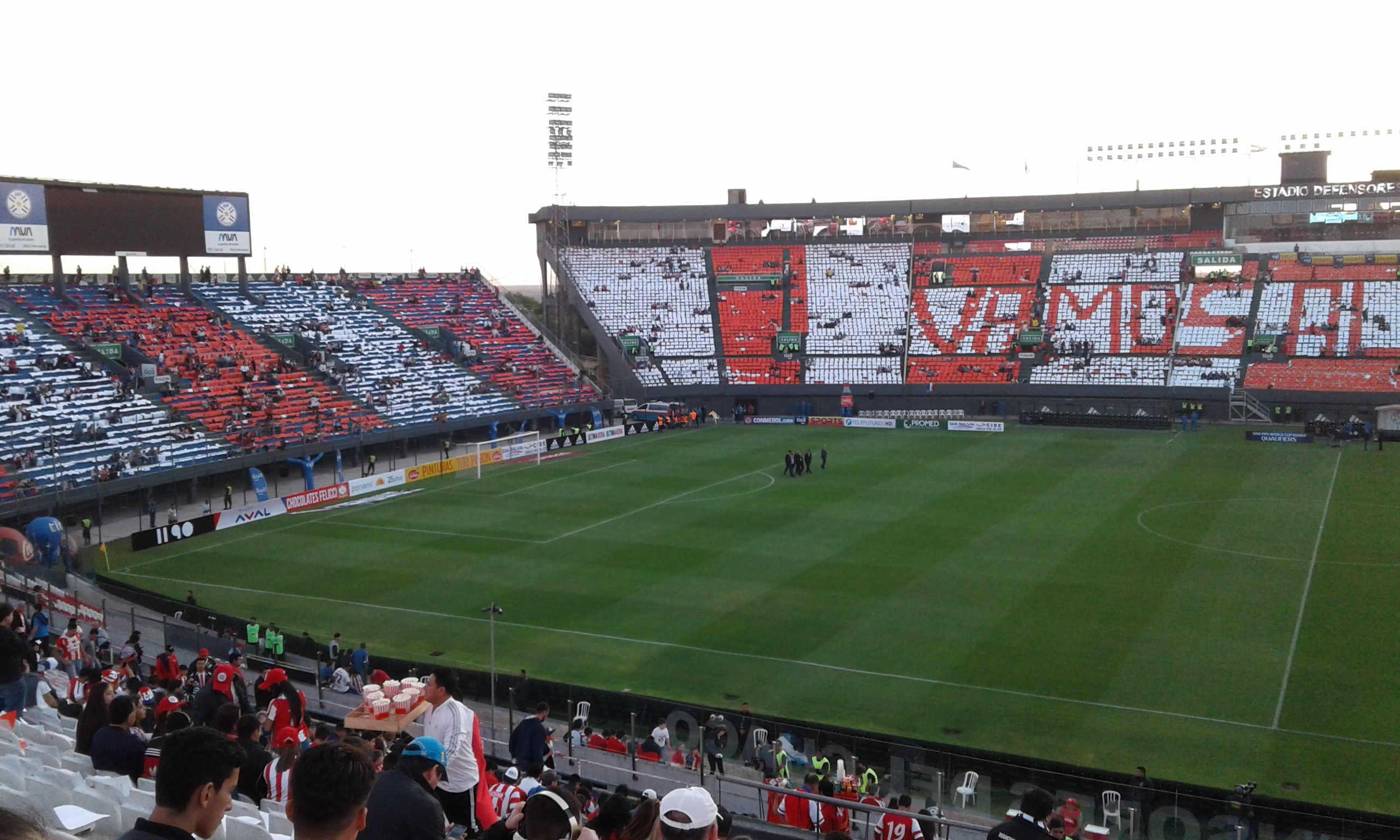
Estadio Cuscatlán (left) and Estadio Defensores del Chaco, venues for the series

== Match details ==
=== First leg ===
1979 Copa Interamericana
February 17, 1980
First leg

FAS (El Salvador)	3–3	(Paraguay) Olimpia
Casadei 58', 72'; Abraham 69'	Report	Solalinde 5'; Isasi 28', 60'

Estadio Cuscatlán, San Salvador
Attendance: 30,000
Referee: Carlos Alfaro (Costa Rica)

FAS	Olimpia

GK	(El Salvador) Humberto Castillo
DF	(El Salvador) Guillermo Rodríguez Bou
DF	(Argentina) Héctor Piccione	(substituted off) a'
DF	(El Salvador) Gonzalo Henríquez
DF	(El Salvador) Carlos Recinos
MF	(El Salvador) Manuel Álvarez
MF	(Argentina) Amado Abraham
MF	(El Salvador) Alfredo Erazo
FW	(El Salvador) Quinteros
FW	(El Salvador) David Cabrera	(substituted off) b'
FW	(Argentina) Roberto Casadei
Substitutes:
	(El Salvador) Ramírez	(substituted on) a'
FW	(El Salvador) Jorge A. González	(substituted on) b'
Manager:
(El Salvador) Juan Francisco Barraza

GK	(Uruguay) (Paraguay) Ever Almeida
DF	(Paraguay) Alicio Solalinde
DF	(Paraguay) Roberto Paredes
DF	(Uruguay) Rubén Giménez
DF	(Paraguay) Alberto Giudice
MF	(Paraguay) Luis Torres
MF	(Paraguay) Carlos Kiese
MF	(Paraguay) Miguel Michelagnoli	(substituted off) a'
FW	(Paraguay) Evaristo Isasi
FW	(Paraguay) Carlos Yaluk
FW	(Paraguay) Osvaldo Aquino	(substituted off) b'
Substitutes:
DF	(Paraguay) Rogelio Delgado	(substituted on) a'
MF	(Paraguay) Eduardo Ortiz	(substituted on) b'
Manager:
(Uruguay) Pedro Cubilla

=== Second leg ===
March 16, 1980
Second leg

Olimpia (Paraguay)	5–0	(El Salvador) FAS
Aquino 12'; Michelagnoli 43', 58', 81'; Ortiz 60'	Report

Defensores del Chaco, Asunción
Attendance: 18,500
Referee: Edison Pérez (Peru)

Olimpia	FAS

GK	(Uruguay) (Paraguay) Ever Almeida
DF	(Paraguay) Alicio Solalinde
DF	(Paraguay) Roberto Paredes
DF	(Paraguay) Flaminio Sosa
DF	(Argentina) Daniel Di Bartolomeo
MF	(Paraguay) Luis Torres
MF	(Paraguay) Carlos Kiese
MF	(Paraguay) Osvaldo Aquino
FW	(Paraguay) Evaristo Isasi	(substituted off) 7'
FW	(Paraguay) Carlos Yaluk	(substituted off) 70'
FW	(Paraguay) Miguel Michelagnoli
Substitutes:
FW	(Paraguay) Eduardo Ortiz	(substituted on) 7'
FW	(Paraguay) Julio Díaz	(substituted on) 70'
Manager:
(Uruguay) Pedro Cubilla

GK	(El Salvador) Humberto Castillo
DF	(El Salvador) Carlos Recinos
DF	(El Salvador) Guillermo Rodríguez Bou
DF	(El Salvador) Jaime Rodríguez
DF	(El Salvador) Gonzalo Henríquez	(substituted off) 20'
MF	(El Salvador) Norberto Huezo
MF	(El Salvador) Manuel Álvarez
MF	(Argentina) Amado Abraham
FW	10	(El Salvador) Jorge A. González
FW	(El Salvador) David Cabrera	(substituted off) 35'
FW	(El Salvador) Alfredo Erazo
Substitutes:
DF	(Argentina) Héctor Piccione	(substituted on) 20'
FW	(El Salvador) Roberto Casadei	(substituted on) 35'
Manager:
(El Salvador) Juan Francisco Barraza
