= 1979 Intercontinental Cup =

| Malmö FF | Olimpia |
| (Sweden) | (Paraguay) |
| 1 | 3 |
- on aggregate

First leg
| Malmö FF | Olimpia |
| 0 | 1 |
- Date: 18 November 1979
- Venue: Malmö Stadion, Malmö
- Referee: Pat Partridge (England)
- Attendance: 4,811

Second leg
| Olimpia | Malmö FF |
| 2 | 1 |
- Date: 2 March 1980
- Venue: Defensores del Chaco, Asunción
- Referee: Juan Daniel Cardellino (Uruguay)
- Attendance: 47,000

The 1979 Intercontinental Cup was an association football final played on a two-legged system. It was the last time in the history of the tournament that this format was used before Toyota became the main sponsor in 1980 and a single-game final was held each year in Japan. The final was played between Olimpia Asunción of Paraguay (winners of the 1979 Copa Libertadores) and Malmö FF of Sweden (runners-up of the 1978–79 European Cup), with Olimpia emerging as the champion after a 3–1 aggregate score win. Malmö FF took its place as the runners-up of the European competition since the European champions Nottingham Forest declined to play the final.

== Match details ==
=== First leg ===
1979 Intercontinental Cup
18 November 1979
First leg

| Malmö FF (Sweden) | 0–1 | (Paraguay) Olimpia |
|---|---|---|
| | Report | E. Isasi 41' |

Malmö Stadion, Malmö
Attendance: 4,811
Referee: Pat Partridge (England)

| Malmö FF | Olimpia |

| GK | (Sweden) Jan Möller |
| DF | (Sweden) Roland Andersson |
| DF | (Sweden) Ingemar Erlandsson |
| DF | (Sweden) Kent Jönsson (c) |
| DF | (Sweden) Mats Arvidsson |
| MF | (Sweden) Claes Malmberg |
| MF | (Sweden) Anders Ljungberg |
| MF | (Sweden) Robert Prytz |
| MF | (Sweden) Tommy Hansson |
| FW | (Sweden) Thomas Sjöberg |
| FW | (Sweden) Jan-Olov Kindvall |
Substitutes:
Manager:
(England) Bob Houghton

| GK | (Paraguay) Ever Hugo Almeida |
| DF | (Paraguay) Alicio Solalinde |
| DF | (Paraguay) Roberto Paredes |
| DF | (Uruguay) Miguel A. Piazza |
| DF | (Paraguay) Flaminio Sosa |
| MF | (Paraguay) Carlos Kiese |
| MF | (Paraguay) Rogelio Delgado |
| MF | (Paraguay) Luis Torres (c) |
| MF | (Paraguay) Eduardo Ortiz |
| FW | (Paraguay) Mauro Céspedes |
| FW | (Paraguay) Evaristo Isasi |
Substitutes:
Manager:
(Uruguay) Luis Cubilla

=== Second leg ===
2 March 1980
Second leg

| Olimpia (Paraguay) | 2–1 | (Sweden) Malmö FF |
|---|---|---|
| Solalinde 39'; Michelagnoli 71' | Report | Erlandsson 46' |

Estadio Defensores del Chaco, Asunción
Attendance: 47,000
Referee: Juan Daniel Cardellino (Uruguay)

| Olimpia | Malmö FF |

| GK | (Paraguay) Ever Hugo Almeida |
| DF | (Paraguay) Alicio Solalinde |
| DF | (Paraguay) Roberto Paredes |
| DF | (Argentina) Daniel Di Bartolomeo |
| DF | (Paraguay) Flaminio Sosa |
| MF | (Paraguay) Carlos Kiese |
| MF | (Paraguay) Carlos Yaluk |
| MF | (Paraguay) Luis Torres (c) |
| FW | (Paraguay) Osvaldo Aquino |
| FW | (Paraguay) Hugo Talavera | Substituted off |
| FW | (Paraguay) Evaristo Isasi |
Substitutes:
| FW | (Paraguay) Miguel Michelagnoli | Substituted on |
Manager:
(Uruguay) Luis Cubilla

GK
DF
DF
DF
DF
MF
MF
MF
MF
FW
FW
Substitutes:
MF
MF
FW
FW
GK
Manager:
(England) Bob Houghton

(Sweden) Jan Möller
(Sweden) Roland Andersson
(England) Tim Parkin
(Sweden) Kent Jönsson (c)
(Sweden) Mats Arvidsson
(Sweden) Magnus Andersson
(Sweden) Ingemar Erlandsson
(Sweden) Robert Prytz
(Sweden) Anders Ohlsson | Substituted off
(Sweden) Thomas Sjöberg | Substituted off
(Sweden) Tommy Andersson
(Sweden) Claes Malmberg | Substituted on
(Sweden) Tommy Hansson | Substituted on
(Sweden) Tore Cervin
(Sweden) Sanny Åslund
(Denmark) John Hansen

== See also ==
- 1979 Copa Libertadores
- 1978–79 European Cup
- Malmö FF in European football
