= List of Intercontinental Cup winning managers =

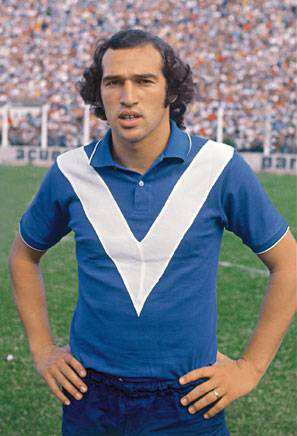
Carlos Bianchi, pictured playing for Vélez Sarsfield c. 1970, won the competition a record three times.

The Intercontinental Cup was an association football club competition contested annually from 1960 to 2004 between the winners of the European Cup and the South American Copa Libertadores. The competition was endorsed by both the Union of European Football Associations (UEFA) and the Confederación Sudamericana de Fútbol (CONMEBOL) and, until 1979, it was played over two legs. In 1980, the Toyota Motor Corporation assumed sponsorship of the contest, renaming it the Toyota Cup and transforming it into a single-match contest, held at a neutral venue in Japan. The competition was discontinued following the introduction in 2000 of the FIFA Club World Cup, which features the champion clubs from all of the Fédération Internationale de Football Association (FIFA) member confederations.

Miguel Muñoz managed Real Madrid to the inaugural title in 1960. Lula became the first manager to win successive titles, leading Santos to victory in 1962 and 1963. Carlos Bianchi won three Intercontinental Cups, the most won by any manager, one with Vélez Sarsfield and two with Boca Juniors. Lula, Helenio Herrera, Arrigo Sacchi and Telê Santana are the only other managers to have won more than one Intercontinental Cup, with each winning the competition twice. Víctor Fernández won the last Intercontinental Cup in 2004, leading Porto to victory against Once Caldas.

Argentine managers won the competition the most times with eleven victories by seven different managers. Uruguayan managers are next with seven victories, followed by Brazilian and Italian coaches with six victories. Two managers won the competition as a player and a manager; Luis Cubilla won the competition in 1961 and 1971 playing for Peñarol and Club Nacional de Football, respectively, before leading Club Olimpia to victory in 1979. Juan Mujica also won the competition as a player with Nacional in 1971 and then led the club to victory in 1980.

== List ==
=== By year ===
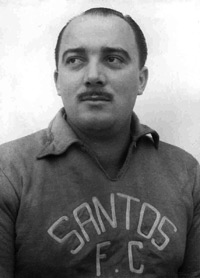
Lula

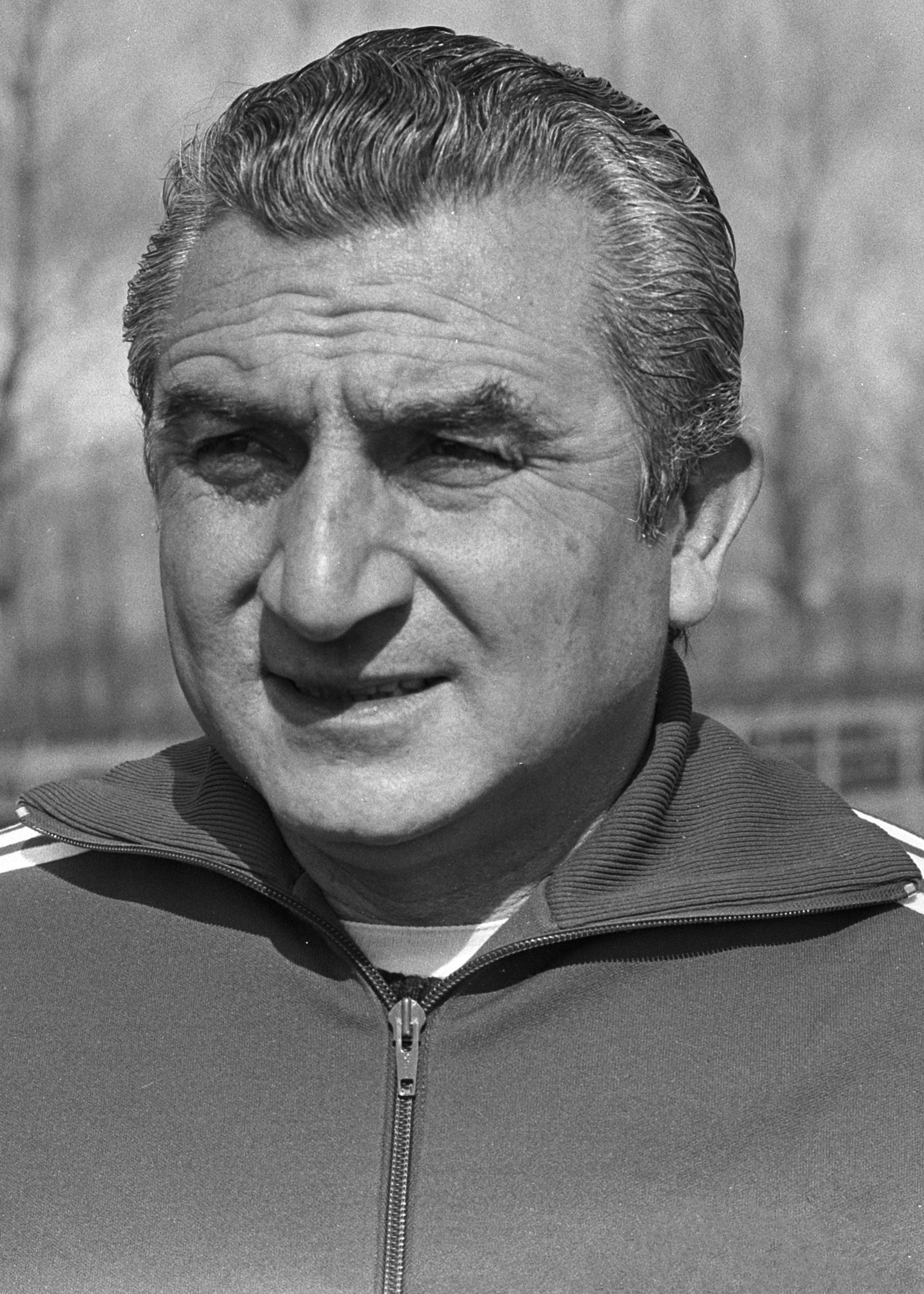
Miguel Muñoz

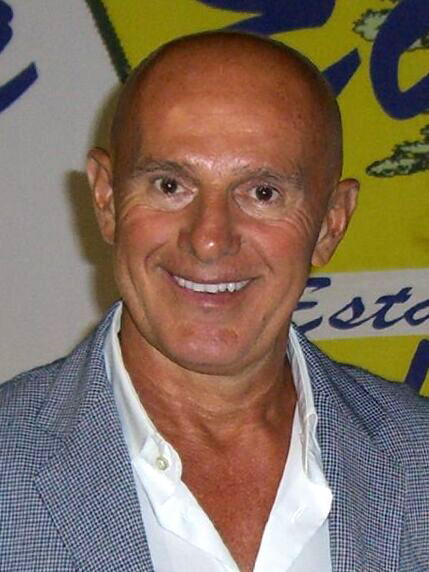
Arrigo Sacchi

Lula was the first manager to win successive titles and Miguel Muñoz won the inaugural competition in 1960 as manager of Real Madrid. Arrigo Sacchi won the competition in successive years with Milan.

Intercontinental Cup winning managers by year
Year	Nationality	Winning manager	Country	Club	Ref(s).
1960	Spain	Miguel Muñoz	Spain	Real Madrid	
1961	Uruguay	Roberto Scarone	Uruguay	Peñarol	
1962	Brazil	Lula	Brazil	Santos	
1963	Brazil	Lula	Brazil	Santos	
1964	Argentina	Helenio Herrera	Italy	Internazionale	
1965	Argentina	Helenio Herrera	Italy	Internazionale	
1966	Uruguay	Roque Máspoli	Uruguay	Peñarol	
1967	Argentina	Juan Pizzuti	Argentina	Racing Club	
1968	Argentina	Osvaldo Zubeldía	Argentina	Estudiantes La Plata	
1969	Italy	Nereo Rocco	Italy	Milan	
1970	Austria	Ernst Happel	Netherlands	Feyenoord	
1971	Uruguay	Washington Etchamendi	Uruguay	Nacional	
1972	Romania	Ștefan Kovács	Netherlands	Ajax	
1973	Argentina	Roberto Ferreiro	Argentina	Independiente	
1974	Spain	Luis Aragonés	Spain	Atlético Madrid	
1975	—	—	—	—	(Note: The 1975 competition was not held as Bayern Munich and Independiente could not decide on dates to play.)
1976	West Germany	Dettmar Cramer	West Germany	Bayern Munich	
1977	Argentina	Juan Carlos Lorenzo	Argentina	Boca Juniors	
1978	—	—	—	—	(Note: The 1978 competition was not held as Boca Juniors and Liverpool declined to play each other.)
1979	Uruguay	Luis Cubilla	Paraguay	Olimpia	
1980	Uruguay	Juan Mujica	Uruguay	Nacional	
1981	Brazil	Paulo César Carpegiani	Brazil	Flamengo	
1982	Uruguay	Hugo Bagnulo	Uruguay	Peñarol	
1983	Brazil	Valdir Espinosa	Brazil	Grêmio	
1984	Argentina	José Pastoriza	Argentina	Independiente	
1985	Italy	Giovanni Trapattoni	Italy	Juventus	
1986	Argentina	Héctor Veira	Argentina	River Plate	
1987	Yugoslavia	Tomislav Ivić	Portugal	Porto	
1988	Uruguay	Roberto Fleitas	Uruguay	Nacional	
1989	Italy	Arrigo Sacchi	Italy	Milan	
1990	Italy	Arrigo Sacchi	Italy	Milan	
1991	Yugoslavia	Vladica Popović	Yugoslavia	Red Star Belgrade	
1992	Brazil	Telê Santana	Brazil	São Paulo	
1993	Brazil	Telê Santana	Brazil	São Paulo	
1994	Argentina	Carlos Bianchi	Argentina	Vélez Sarsfield	
1995	Netherlands	Louis van Gaal	Netherlands	Ajax	
1996	Italy	Marcello Lippi	Italy	Juventus	
1997	Italy	Nevio Scala	Germany	Borussia Dortmund	
1998	Netherlands	Guus Hiddink	Spain	Real Madrid	
1999	Scotland	Alex Ferguson	England	Manchester United	
2000	Argentina	Carlos Bianchi	Argentina	Boca Juniors	
2001	Germany	Ottmar Hitzfeld	Germany	Bayern Munich	
2002	Spain	Vicente del Bosque	Spain	Real Madrid	
2003	Argentina	Carlos Bianchi	Argentina	Boca Juniors	
2004	Spain	Víctor Fernández	Portugal	Porto	

=== Managers with multiple titles ===
Managers with multiple Intercontinental Cup wins
Rank	Nation	Manager	Won	Runner-up	Years won	Years runner-up	Clubs won
1	Argentina	Carlos Bianchi	3	1	1994, 2000, 2003	2001	Vélez Sarsfield, Boca Juniors
2	Brazil	Luís Alonso Pérez	2	0	1962, 1963	—	Santos
2	Argentina	Helenio Herrera	2	0	1964, 1965	—	Internazionale
2	Italy	Arrigo Sacchi	2	0	1989, 1990	—	Milan
2	Brazil	Telê Santana	2	0	1992, 1993	—	São Paulo

=== By nationality ===
This table lists the total number of titles won by managers of each nationality.

Intercontinental Cup winning managers by nationality
Nationality	Number of wins
Argentina	11
Uruguay	7
Brazil	6
Italy	6
Spain	4
Germany	2
Netherlands	2
Yugoslavia	2
Austria	1
Romania	1
Scotland	1

== See also ==
- List of European Cup and UEFA Champions League winning managers
- List of Copa Libertadores winning managers
- Intercontinental Cup records and statistics
