= La Nación (disambiguation) =

La Nación (Spanish for "The Nation") is an Argentine newspaper based in Buenos Aires.

La Nación may also refer to:

- La Nación (Chile), a Chilean newspaper based in Santiago
- La Nación (Costa Rica), a Costa Rican newspaper based in San José
- La Nación (Paraguay), a Paraguayan newspaper based in Fernando de la Mora
- La Nación (Spain), a Spanish newspaper published in Madrid from 1925 to 1936
