= Oscar Vicente Scavone =

Paraguayan businessman (born 1955)

- Born: July 2, 1955; Asunción, Paraguay

Oscar Vicente Scavone (born July 2, 1955 in Asunción) is a successful Paraguayan businessman and former president of one of the nation's premier soccer teams, Club Olimpia.

Scavone, son of Pascual Scavone, a pioneer in the Paraguayan pharmaceutical industry, was vice-president of Club Olimpia between 1994–1994 and 1996–1999, during the presidency of former president Osvaldo Domínguez Dibb, and President from 2004–2006. Scavone is a third-generation Olimpia president in the family, following in the footsteps of his father and grandfather.

Oscar Vicente Scavone has recently been appointed the role of economic adviser to newly elected Paraguayan president Horacio Cartes.

He resides in Asuncion, where he runs a group of companies in the Pharmaceutical, Plastic and Graphic industry, highly developed companies that export to the Mercosur and other countries in Latin America. Among his main activities are: President of Grafica Mayo S.A. (1980 until today); Founder and President of the Board of Directors of Laboratorios de Productos Eticos S.A. (1983 until today); Member of the Board of Directors of PROGRESO Sociedad de Ahorro para la Vivienda (1983 to 1992); Member of the Board of Directors of the Camara y Bolsa Paraguaya de Comercio (1984/1985); Founder and President of the Board of Directors of Viscount Plasticos S.A. (1988 until today); President of the Camara de la Industria Quimica Farmaceutica del Paraguay, CIFARMA, (2004/2008); Member of the Board of Directors of Vicente Scavone & Cia, Laboratorios Lasca, since 1980 and First Vice-President from 2004 until today; and President of the Consejo Empresarial de America Latina, CEAL, Capitulo Paraguay, (2011/2012).
