= Cristín Cibils =

Paraguayan footballer (born 1956)

Personal information
- Full name: Cristín Eugenio Cibils González
- Date of birth: 13 March 1956 (age 70)
- Place of birth: Loma Pytá, Paraguay
- Position: Defender

Youth career
- 1970–1971: Atlético Juventud

Senior career*
Years	Team	Apps	(Gls)
1972–1976	Olimpia	?	(?)
1976–1980	Tembetary	?	(?)
1980	Cerro Porteño	?	(?)
1981	Guaraní	?	(?)
1982	→La Serena (loan)	?	(?)
1982–1984	Guaraní	?	(?)
1985–1986	Olimpia	?	(?)
1987–1988	Boquerón	?	(?)
1989	Atlético Juventud	?	(?)

International career
	Paraguay	?	(?)
- * Club domestic league appearances and goals

Cristín Eugenio Cibils González (born 13 March 1956) is a former football defender.

== Career ==
Cibils started his career at the youth divisions of Atlético Juventud of his hometown Loma Pytá. He then moved to Olimpia where he spent several years in the reserve and as usually came in as a substitute. Cibils was then transferred to Tembetary where he spent his best years as he was called up to the Paraguay national football team and was part of the squad that won the Copa América 1979. In 1980, he had a brief spell with Cerro Porteño where the club finished in second place in the Paraguayan league. After a few years in Guaraní he was loaned to La Serena of Chile. In 1985, he returned to Olimpia, but his position was well covered by players such as Rogelio Delgado and Gustavo Benítez so Cibils had very limited playing time which made him leave the club to Boquerón and Atlético Juventud where he finished his career in 1989.

== Titles ==
Season	Team	Title
1979	Paraguay	Copa América
