= Pedro Cubilla =

Uruguayan footballer and coach (1933–2007)

Personal information
- Full name: Pedro Ramón Cubilla Almeida
- Date of birth: August 25, 1933
- Place of birth: Paysandú, Uruguay
- Date of death: March 16, 2007 (aged 73)
- Place of death: Montevideo, Uruguay
- Position: Midfielder

Youth career
- Peñarol Paysandú
- Nacional

Senior career*
| Years | Team | Apps | (Gls) |
| 1956 | Nacional | 1 | (0) |
| 1956 | Liverpool Montevideo | | |
| 1957–1960 | Peñarol | | |
| 1961–1962 | Rampla Juniors | | |
| 1963–1964 | Huracán | 43 | (2) |
| 1965 | River Plate | 0 | (0) |
| 1966 | Quilmes | 5 | (1) |
| 1966–1967 | Defensor | | |
| 1968 | Toronto Falcons | | |

International career
| 1961–1962 | Uruguay | 7 | (0) |

Managerial career
- 1976: Santiago Morning
- 1976–1977: Nacional (assistant)
- 1976: Nacional (caretaker)
- 1978: Danubio
- 1979: Olimpia (assistant)
- 1980: Olimpia
- 1980–1981: Peñarol (youth)
- 1981: Peñarol (assistant)
- 1982: Olimpia (assistant)
- 1982–1983: Huracán FC
- 1985: Rampla Juniors
- 1985: Nacional (assistant)
- 1985: Nacional (caretaker)
- 1986: Huracán Buceo
- 1987: Deportivo Quito
- 1988: Central Español
- 1988–1991: Olimpia (assistant)
- 1991: Uruguay (caretaker)
- 1991–1993: Uruguay (assistant)
- 1995–1997: Olimpia (assistant)
- 1998: Cartaginés
- * Club domestic league appearances and goals

Pedro Ramón Cubilla Almeida (25 August 1933 in Paysandú, Uruguay – 16 March 2007 in Montevideo, Uruguay) was a Uruguayan professional footballer and manager.

== Playing career ==
Pedro Cubilla started his career as a professional playing for Uruguayan clubs Nacional, Peñarol, Rampla Juniors and Liverpool de Montevideo in the Primera División Uruguaya. He continued his international career in Argentina playing for Huracán between 1963–1964 and Quilmes in 1966 in the Primera División Argentina after being transferred from River Plate in 1965, where he spent a year inactive due to an injury. He returned to Uruguay in 1967 where he played for C.A. Defensor.

In 1968, he was transferred for the former NASL Canadian team Toronto Falcons coached by the legendary Ladislao Kubala.

He also played for the Uruguay national football team, taking part of a European tour previous to the 1962 FIFA World Cup in Chile.

== Coaching career ==
His career as a professional coach includes Uruguayan clubs Fénix, Huracán, Danubio, Rampla Juniors, Central Español and Huracán Buceo. Internationally he coached Chilean Santiago Morning, Paraguayan Club Olimpia, Ecuadorian Deportivo Quito and C.S. Cartaginés of Costa Rica.

Pedro Cubilla also worked together with his younger brother Luis as the Assistant Coach for Uruguayan clubs Nacional, Peñarol, Paraguayan Club Olimpia and the Uruguay national football team.

In 1998, he was named president of the Uruguayan National Association of Football Trainers.

== Art ==
Besides football he had a passion for painting. He created many paintings containing scenes of the Afro-Uruguayan candombe culture, tango bars and portraits.

== Honours ==
Peñarol

- Uruguayan Primera División (1): 1960
- Copa Libertadores (1): 1960
- Intercontinental Cup (1): 1960
