= William Paats =

Dutch-born Paraguayan sports instructor

William Paats (b. Friedrich Wilhelm Paats Hantelmann, 12 January 1876, Rotterdam – d. 28 August 1946, Asunción) was a Dutch-born Paraguayan sports instructor.

Often regarded as "the father of Paraguayan football", Paats' family moved to Asunción, Paraguay in 1894. At that time, William was 18 years old and soon noticed the lack in the formal practice of any sport in Paraguay.

After a few years, he became a physical education instructor at the Escuela Normal de Maestros in Asunción. In one of his trips to Buenos Aires, he bought a ball and brought it back to Paraguay; and soon after he started teaching the practice of football to his students. The journalist Julio César Maldonado, in his book Historia del Fútbol Paraguayo (1900-1965) claims that it was Lucio Sila Godoy who brought the first balls from Buenos Aires. The forementioned Godoy is also credited as a co-founder of the Paraguayan team Olimpia. The popularity of football in Paraguay rose immediately. Due to the success and enormous interest of the people, Paats encouraged the founding of the first Paraguayan football club, and so on 25 July 1902 Club Olimpia was born.

Paats was also a founding member of the Liga Paraguaya de Fútbol (Paraguayan Football League) in 1906 and served as President of the mentioned organisation from 1909 to 1910. He also promoted and taught the practice of other sports disciplines such as cricket, tennis, swimming and rowing. His passion for sports and social activities led him to found the social and sports club Sajonia in 1921 and the Touring y Automóvil Club Paraguayo in 1924. He also served as a consul for the Netherlands until 1935.

Paats died on 28 August 1946, in Asunción, leaving his legacy as one of the most important sports personalities in Paraguay.
