= La Nación (Paraguay) =

Daily periodical in Paraguay

- Type: Daily newspaper
- Owner: Sarah Cartes
- Founder: Osvaldo Domínguez Dibb
- President: José María Agüero Halley
- Founded: May 25, 1995; 31 years ago
- Language: Spanish
- Headquarters: Fernando de la Mora
- Country: Paraguay
- Website: www.lanacion.com.py

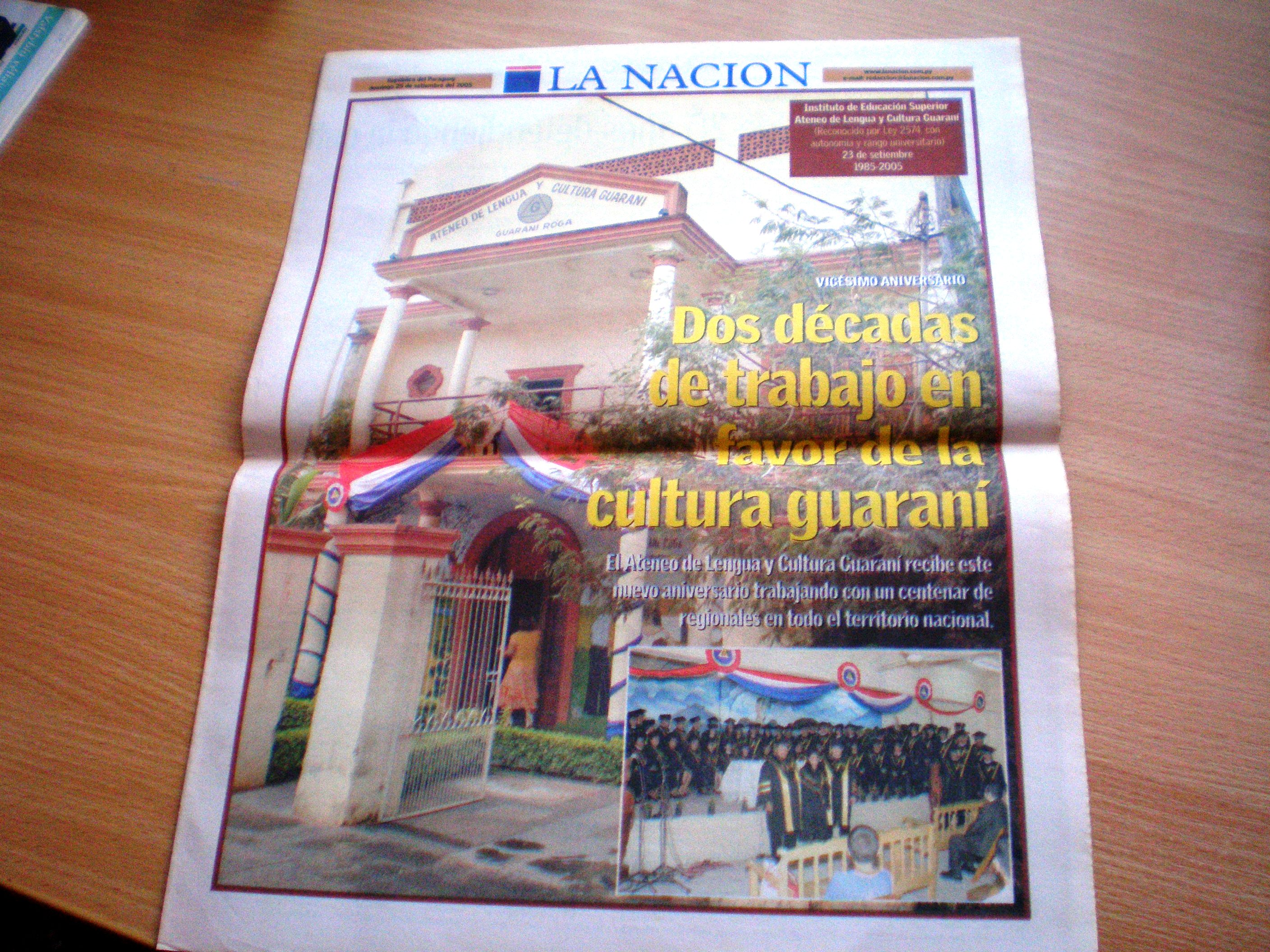
Page of the Paraguayan newspaper "La Nacion"

La Nación is a conservative daily newspaper published in Paraguay.

== History ==
Founded on May 25, 1995, by the businessman and sports director Osvaldo Domínguez Dibb, in the city of Fernando de la Mora.

Together with Diario Crónica and the broadcasting stations Montecarlo FM 100.9 and 970 AM it is part of Grupo Nación de Comunicaciones.

The NGO Survival awarded it the prize for "The most racist article" of the year 2007, for calling Indians "Neolithic" and comparing them to "a cancer".

On April 15, 2015, the businesswoman Sarah Cartes formalized yesterday the acquisition of the Nation Group Communications, which became part of the Cartes Group.

For 15 years, the Communication Nation Group was led by the businessman and sports director Alejandro Domínguez, son of Osvaldo Domínguez Dibb; who in January 2016 was chosen as president of the Conmebol.

In August 2015, the Nación de Comunicaciones Group bought the Popular newspaper, in addition to the web site hoy.com.py and a radio that is transmitted over the internet, all belonging to the Multimedia group, of former President Juan Carlos Wasmosy.
