= Luis Torres (footballer, born 1952) =

Paraguayan footballer

Personal information
- Full name: Ernesto Luis Torres Torreani
- Date of birth: 7 November 1952 (age 73)
- Place of birth: Asunción, Paraguay
- Position: Midfielder

Senior career*
Years	Team	Apps	(Gls)
1970–1974	Nacional		
1975-1985	Olimpia		
1985–1987	Nacional		

International career
1975-1981	Paraguay	26	(0)
- * Club domestic league appearances and goals

Ernesto Luis Torres Torreani (born 7 November 1952 in Asunción, Paraguay) is a former footballer who played as a midfielder.

== Honours ==
=== Club ===
- Olimpia
  - Paraguayan Primera División: 1978, 1979, 1980, 1981
  - Copa Libertadores: 1979
  - Copa Interamericana: 1979
  - Intercontinental Cup: 1979

== Titles ==
Season	Team	Title
1979	Paraguay	Copa América
