= Luis Cubilla =

Uruguayan footballer and coach (1940–2013)

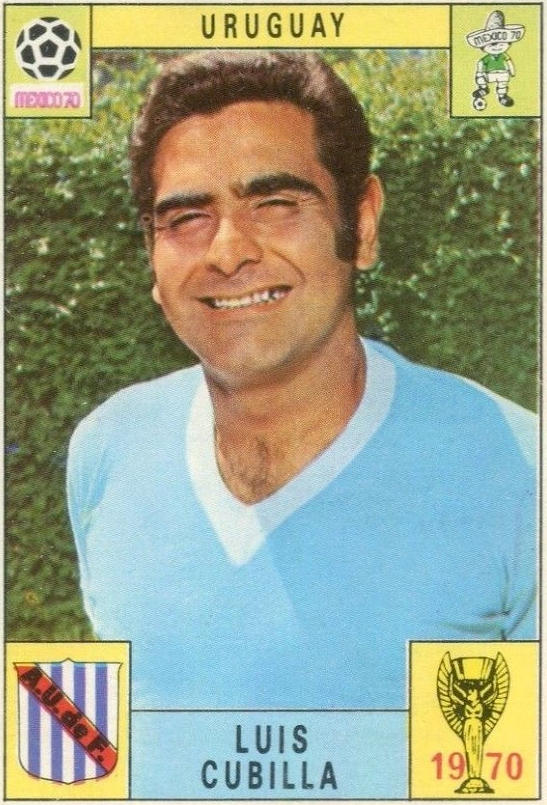
- Cubilla with Uruguay in 1970

Personal information
- Full name: Luis Alberto Cubilla Almeida
- Date of birth: 28 March 1940
- Place of birth: Paysandú, Uruguay
- Date of death: 3 March 2013 (aged 72)
- Place of death: Asunción, Paraguay
- Position: Winger

Youth career
- Colón de Paysandú

Senior career*
Years	Team	Apps	(Gls)
1958–1962	Peñarol	123	(24)
1962–1964	Barcelona	26	(3)
1964–1968	River Plate	129	(31)
1969–1974	Nacional	150	(39)
1975	Santiago Morning	14	(2)
1976	Defensor Sporting	18	(3)

International career
1959–1974	Uruguay	38	(11)

Managerial career
- 1979–1980: Olimpia Asunción
- 1980: Newell's Old Boys
- 1981: Peñarol
- 1982: Olimpia Asunción
- 1983: Atlético Nacional
- 1984: River Plate
- 1988–1991: Olimpia Asunción
- 1991–1993: Uruguay
- 1994: Racing Club
- 1995–1999: Olimpia Asunción
- 2003: Talleres
- 2005: Comunicaciones
- 2007: Barcelona SC
- 2009: Colegio Nacional Iquitos
- 2010: Olimpia Asunción
- 2012: Tacuary
- * Club domestic league appearances and goals as of September 2022

Luis Alberto Cubilla Almeida (28 March 1940 – 3 March 2013) was a Uruguayan professional footballer and manager. He had a successful playing career winning 16 major titles. He then went on to become one of the most successful managers in South American football with 17 major titles.

== Early career ==
Also known as "El Negro", Cubilla was born in Paysandú and started his playing career in the youth team of Colón de Paysandú. In 1957 he joined Peñarol where he was part of the team that won four Uruguayan league championships, two Copa Libertadores and a Copa Intercontinental.

== Career highlights ==
In 1962 he joined FC Barcelona of Spain, where he was part of the team that won the Copa del Rey in 1963. He played 49 games and scored 12 goals with Barça.

Cubilla returned to South America in 1964 to play for River Plate of Argentina. In 1969, he returned to Uruguay joining Nacional where he won 4 more Uruguayan league titles, another Copa Libertadores, a Copa Interamericana and another Copa Intercontinental.

In the last years of his career he played for Santiago Morning of Chile and Defensor Sporting of Uruguay where he helped the club to win their first league championship and break the complete dominance of the league by Peñarol and Nacional.

Between 1959 and 1974 Cubilla played 38 games for the Uruguay national team in which he scored 11 goals. He played in three World Cups in 1962, 1970 and 1974.

== Managerial career ==
As a coach, Cubilla achieved enormous success with Olimpia of Paraguay, winning 7 international titles (among them two of the team's three Copas Libertadores) and several national championships. He also coached Nacional, Peñarol, Defensor Sporting, Danubio (all of Uruguay), Atlético Nacional of Colombia, Newell's Old Boys and River Plate of Argentina and Cerro Porteño and Club Libertad, both from Paraguay.

Between 1991 and 1993 Luis Cubilla was the head coach of the Uruguay National Team and worked together with his older brother Pedro Cubilla as his assistant coach and Alejandro Riccino as the physical trainer.

During 1994 he coached the famous Argentinean club Racing Club de Avellaneda.

In February 2007, Cubilla signed with the Ecuadorian team Barcelona de Guayaquil.

In 2010, he returned once again as a coach for Olimpia. He died, aged 72, in Asunción.

== Honours ==
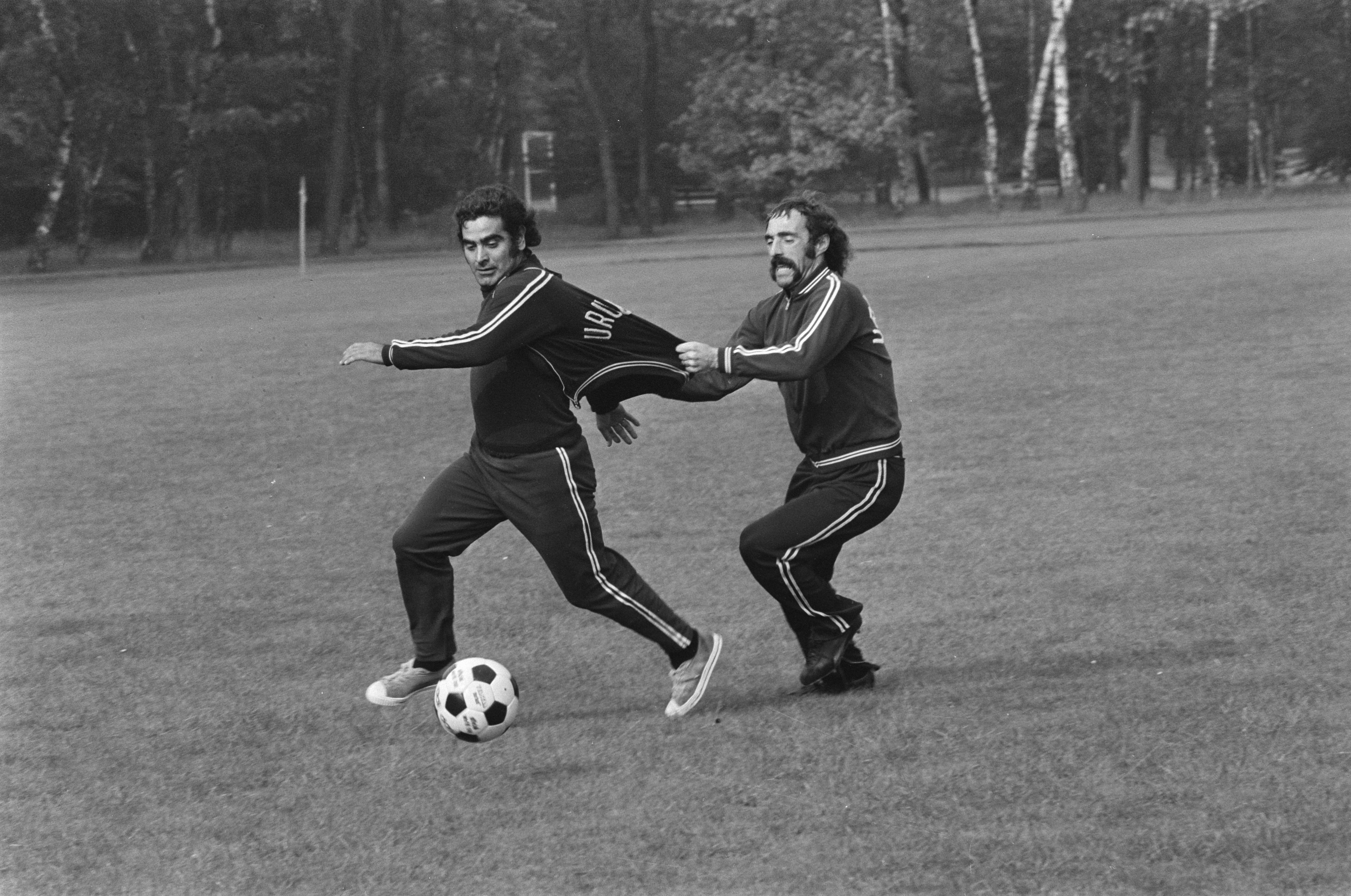
Cubilla and Ricardo Pavoni (1974)

=== As a player ===
Peñarol

- Uruguayan Primera División: 1958, 1959, 1960, 1961
- Copa Libertadores: 1960, 1961
- Intercontinental Cup: 1961

Barcelona

- Copa del Rey: 1962–63

Nacional

- Uruguayan Primera División: 1969, 1970, 1971, 1972
- Copa Libertadores: 1971
- Intercontinental Cup: 1971
- Copa Interamericana: 1971

Defensor

- Uruguayan Primera División: 1976

Individual

- IFFHS Uruguayan Men's Dream Team

=== As a manager ===
Olimpia Asunción

- Paraguayan Primera División: 1979, 1982, 1988, 1989, 1995, 1997, 1998, 1999
- Copa Libertadores: 1979, 1990
- Supercopa Libertadores: 1990
- Recopa Sudamericana: 1990, 2003
- Intercontinental Cup: 1979
- Copa Interamericana: 1979

Peñarol

- Uruguayan Primera División: 1981

Preceded by Sebastião Lazaroni	South American Coach of the Year; 1990	Succeeded by Alfio Basile
