= Amado Pérez =

Paraguayan footballer (born 1959)

Personal information
- Full name: Amado Pérez Castillo
- Date of birth: 24 June 1956 (age 70)
- Place of birth: Luque, Paraguay
- Position: Forward

Senior career*
Years	Team	Apps	(Gls)
1979–1980	Sol de América		
1980	Vélez Sarsfield	14	(1)
1980–1981	León	4	(0)
1981–1984	Cerro Porteño		

International career
1979	Paraguay	4	(0)
- * Club domestic league appearances and goals

Amado Pérez Castillo (born 24 June 1956) is a Paraguayan footballer.

== International career ==
Pérez played in four matches for the Paraguay national football team in 1979. He was also part of Paraguay's squad for the 1979 Copa América tournament.

== Personal life ==
Pérez is the uncle of the footballer Marcelo Pérez.
