= Roberto Paredes =

Paraguayan footballer (born 1955)

Personal information
- Full name: Rubén Roberto Paredes Vera
- Date of birth: 28 September 1955 (age 71)
- Place of birth: Asunción, Paraguay
- Height: 1.85 m (6 ft 1 in)
- Position: Centre-back

Youth career
- 1969–1971: Sol de América

Senior career*
Years	Team	Apps	(Gls)
1971–1973	Sol de América		
1973–1976	Cruz Azul		
1976–1978	Tembetary		
1979–1982	Olimpia		
1983–1985	Atlético Nacional		
1985–1986	Deportivo Pereira		
1987	Sol de América	4	(0)
1987	Barcelona SC	3	(0)

International career
1976–1981	Paraguay	15	(0)

Managerial career
- 1997: Unión Española
- Libertad (youth)
- 2004: Libertad (interim)
- 2012: Libertad (interim)
- 2018: Libertad (assistant)
- * Club domestic league appearances and goals

Rubén Roberto Paredes Vera (born 28 September 1955), known as Roberto Paredes, is a former football centre-back.

== Early life ==
Paredes was born in Asunción, Paraguay.

== Coaching career ==
In 1997, Paredes led Unión Española alongside his compatriot Rogelio Delgado.

He has also worked for the Libertad youth system. In 2004 and 2012, he assumed as interim coach of the first team.

== Honours ==
=== Player ===
Olimpia

- Paraguayan Primera División: 1979, 1980, 1981, 1982
- Copa Libertadores: 1979
- Copa Interamericana: 1979
- Intercontinental Cup: 1979

Paraguay

- Copa América: 1979
