= Víctor Estay =

Chilean footballer (born 1951)

Personal information
- Full name: Víctor Manuel Estay Vásquez
- Date of birth: 21 February 1951 (age 75)
- Place of birth: El Melón, Nogales, Chile
- Position: Forward

Senior career*
Years	Team	Apps	(Gls)
1970–1978	Deportes Concepción	200	(77)
1979–1981	Unión Española	70	(29)
1982	Deportes La Serena	17	(1)
1983–1984	Rangers	36	(9)
Total		323	(116)

International career
1979	Chile	6	(0)
- * Club domestic league appearances and goals

Víctor Manuel Estay Vásquez (born 24 February 1951) is a former Chilean footballer who played as forward.

== Career ==
Estay played for four clubs, all of them in the Chilean Primera División: Deportes Concepción, Unión Española, Deportes La Serena and Rangers de Talca.

At international level, he played in six matches for the Chile national football team in 1979. He was also part of Chile's squad for the 1979 Copa América tournament.
