= Flaminio Sosa =

Paraguayan footballer (born 1946)

Personal information
- Full name: Flaminio Sosa Ovelar
- Date of birth: 24 January 1946 (age 80)
- Place of birth: Caraguatay, Paraguay
- Height: 1.73 m (5 ft 8 in)
- Position: Centre back

Senior career*
Years	Team	Apps	(Gls)
1964–1974	Guarani		
1975-1981	Olimpia		

International career
1970-1981	Paraguay	15	(0)
- * Club domestic league appearances and goals

Flaminio Sosa Ovelar (born 24 January 1946 in Caraguatay, Paraguay) is a former footballer. He played at centre back position.

== Honours ==
=== Club ===
- Guarani
  - Paraguayan Primera División: 1964, 1967, 1969
- Olimpia
  - Paraguayan Primera División: 1978, 1979, 1980, 1981
  - Copa Libertadores: 1979
  - Copa Interamericana: 1979
  - Intercontinental Cup: 1979

== Titles ==
Season	Team	Title
1979	Paraguay	Copa América
