= Mariscal López =

Coordinates: 25°17′S 57°36′W

- Barrio
- Interactive map of Mariscal López
- Country: Paraguay
- Autonomous Capital District: Gran Asunción
- City: Asunción

Area
  - Total: 1.57 km^{2} (0.61 sq mi)
- Elevation: 43 m (141 ft)

Population
  - Total: 6,340

Mariscal López is a neighbourhood (barrio) of Asunción, Paraguay. The neighborhood was constituted as a neighborhood during the 1940s. The neighborhood's name is based on the historical president of Paraguay, Francisco Solano López, who was the second constitutional president of the Republic of Paraguay between 1862 and 1870. He served as commander-in-chief of the Armed Forces, president, and supreme chief of the Paraguayan nation during the War of the Triple Alliance.
