= Hugo Talavera =

Paraguayan footballer (born 1949)

Personal information
- Full name: Hugo Ricardo Talavera Valdez
- Date of birth: 31 October 1949
- Place of birth: Asunción, Paraguay
- Position: Attacking midfielder

Youth career
- Club Nacional
- Club Guaraní

Senior career*
Years	Team	Apps	(Gls)
1971–1975	Cerro Porteño		
1975–1985	Club Olimpia		
- Newell's Old Boys
Total		–	(–)

International career
1974–1979	Paraguay	11	(2)

Managerial career
- 2005: Club Olimpia
Medal record
Men's football
Representing Paraguay
Copa América
Winner	1979
- * Club domestic league appearances and goals

Hugo Ricardo Talavera Valdez (born 31 October 1949 in Asunción, Paraguay) is a Paraguayan former professional footballer and coach. He is regarded as one of the great creative midfielders in Paraguayan football history, he is particularly remembered for his achievements with Club Olimpia and the Paraguay.

Nicknamed "El Arquitecto" (The Architect), Talavera was renowned for his technical ability, elegance on the ball, leadership and creativity. He was one of the central figures in an extraordinary footballing year in 1979, when he won the Copa Libertadores, the Intercontinental Cup and the Copa América.

== Early life ==
Talavera was born and raised in Sajonia, a neighbourhood of Asunción, Paraguay. His football journey began through informal street football in his neighbourhood. He subsequently attended Colegio Cristo Rey, where he continued developing his footballing abilities.

Interestingly, Talavera revealed in a 2005 interview that he initially played as a central defender. His technical ability, particularly his capacity to control the ball and initiate attacks from the back, helped shape his eventual development into an attacking midfielder. He was encouraged by teachers Livio Ramírez and Lorenzo "Cachito" Recalde to join the youth academy of Club Nacional.

== Career ==
Talavera started his career at Nacional of Barrio Obrero before moving to Club Guaraní, where he played briefly. His career advanced in 1971, when he joined Cerro Porteño and won three national championships in a row. In 1975, Talavera moved to rival club Olimpia, where he became a key player by winning several national and international titles until 1985, the year of his retirement. In 1979 He was champion of the Copa Libertadores and the Intercontinental Cup. He also played for the Argentine club Newell's Old Boys.

At the national team level, Talavera was part of the Paraguay squad that won the 1979 Copa América tournament. That year Talavera won everything at the club level and at the national team level, being captain and figure.

After retiring from football, he briefly acted as Olimpia's head coach in 2005.

== Career statistics ==
=== International ===
Paraguay score listed first, score column indicates score after each Hugo Talavera goal

List of international goals scored by Hugo Talavera
No.	Date	Venue	Opponent	Score	Result	Competition
1	29 August 1979	Atahualpa Olympic Stadium, Quito, Ecuador	Ecuador	1–0	2–1	1979 Copa América
2	24 October 1979	Estadio Defensores del Chaco, Asunción, Paraguay	Brazil	2–0	2–1	1979 Copa América

== Honours ==
Cerro Porteño

- Paraguayan Primera División: 1972, 1973, 1974

Club Olimpia

- Paraguayan Primera División: 1978, 1979, 1980, 1981, 1982, 1983, 1985
- Copa Libertadores: 1979
- Copa Interamericana: 1979
- Intercontinental Cup: 1979

Paraguay

- Copa América: 1979
