= Rogelio Delgado =

Paraguayan footballer (born 1959)

Personal information
- Full name: Rogelio Wilfrido Delgado Casco
- Date of birth: 12 October 1959 (age 67)
- Place of birth: Asunción, Paraguay
- Height: 1.78 m (5 ft 10 in)
- Position: Defender

Youth career
- 1974–1976: Olimpia Asunción

Senior career*
Years	Team	Apps	(Gls)
1976–1987	Olimpia Asunción		
1976	→ Enrique Happ (loan)		
1987–1992	Independiente	71	(4)
1992–1994	Universidad de Chile	126	(6)
1995	Colo-Colo	1	(0)

International career
1983–1990	Paraguay	53	(6)

Managerial career
- 1995: Colo-Colo (assistant)
- 1997: Unión Española
- 2000: Deportes Antofagasta
- 2001: 12 de Octubre
- 2004: Sportivo Luqueño
- * Club domestic league appearances and goals

Rogelio Wilfrido Delgado Casco (born 12 October 1959) is a retired football central defender from Paraguay.

== Club career ==
At the club level, Delgado played for Olimpia Asunción, where he won the Copa Libertadores and Intercontinental Cup in 1979, and six Paraguayan league titles.

He also played for Independiente of Argentina, where he won the 1988–1989 league championship, and for Universidad de Chile, where he won the 1994 Chilean league championship.

After retiring as a player, Delgado took up coaching. He came out of retirement to play one game for Colo-Colo in the 1995 edition of the Supercopa.

== International career ==
Delgado was a member of the Paraguayan squad at the 1979 FIFA World Youth Championship. He made his full international debut for the Paraguay national football team on 2 June 1983 in a friendly match against Uruguay (0-0). He obtained a total number of 53 international caps, scoring six goals for the national side. He was a member of the Paraguay squad at the 1986 FIFA World Cup in Mexico. He also played in three editions of the Copa América in 1983, 1987 and 1989.

== Coaching career ==
He started his career as the assistant coach of Gustavo Benítez in Colo-Colo. In 1997, he led Unión Española alongside his compatriot Roberto Paredes.

He also has coached Deportes Antofagasta in Chile, 12 de Octubre and Sportivo Luqueño in Paraguay.

== Honours ==
Olimpia

- Paraguayan Primera División (6): 1978, 1979, 1981, 1982, 1983, 1985
- Copa Libertadores (1): 1979
- Copa Intercontinental (1): 1979
- Copa Interamericana (1): 1979

Independiente

- Argentine Primera (1): 1988–1989

Universidad de Chile

- Primera División de Chile (1): 1994
