= Ranulfo Miranda =

Paraguayan footballer (1927–2017)

Personal information
- Full name: Ranulfo Miranda Fleitas
- Date of birth: 27 May 1927
- Place of birth: Areguá, Paraguay
- Date of death: 19 April 2017 (aged 89)
- Position: Forward

Senior career*
Years	Team	Apps	(Gls)
1942–1946	Sudamérica de Paraguarí		
1946–1949	Club Guaraní		
1950	América de Cali		
- Once Caldas

International career
1947	Paraguay	4	(0)

Managerial career
- 1979–1980: Paraguay
- 1983: Club Nacional
- 1985: CSD Comunicaciones
- Club Cerro Porteño
- Club Rubio Ñu
- Club Atlético Tembetary
- Alianza FC (El Salvador)
- Club Jorge Wilstermann
- Deportivo Pereira
- LDU Quito
- C.D. Olmedo
- CSD Macará
- * Club domestic league appearances and goals

Ranulfo Miranda Fleitas (27 May 1927 – 19 April 2017) was a Paraguayan association football player. A forward, he made four appearances for the Paraguay national team. After retiring as a player, he became a football manager. As manager of Paraguay, he led the national team to victory in the 1979 Copa América, securing the country's second continental title and its first since 1953.

== Club career ==
Ranulfo Miranda began his career in 1942 before joining Club Guaraní in 1946. As captain, he led the club to the Paraguayan league title in 1949 and finished as the team's leading goalscorer. In 1950 he moved to Colombia, where he played first for América de Cali and later for Once Caldas.

== International career ==
Miranda represented Paraguay at the 1947 South American Championship, appearing in four of the team's seven matches. Paraguay finished runners-up after recording five wins, one draw and one defeat. He was unable to participate in the 1953 South American Championship because his Colombian club refused to release him for international duty. At the time, there were no regulations requiring clubs to release players for international matches, nor were compensation payments made by the national association.As a result, he did not take part in the competition in Peru, where Paraguay won its first South American title.

== Managerial career ==
Miranda managed the Paraguay national team from 1979 to 1980 and guided the side to victory in the 1979 Copa América. The triumph secured Paraguay's second South American championship, following their first title in 1953.

In addition to managing the national team, Miranda coached Club Cerro Porteño, Club Nacional, Club Rubio Ñu, Club Atlético Tembetary and Universal de Encarnación in Paraguay. Abroad, he managed CSD Comunicaciones in Guatemala, Alianza FC (El Salvador) in El Salvador, Club Jorge Wilstermann in Bolivia, Deportivo Pereira in Colombia, and Ecuadorian clubs LDU Quito, C.D. Olmedo and CSD Macará.

== Honours ==
=== Player ===
Club Guaraní

- Paraguayan Primera División: 1949

=== Manager ===
Paraguay

- Copa América: 1979
