= Enzo Escobar =

Chilean footballer (born 1951)

Personal information
- Full name: Enzo Sergio Escobar Olivares
- Date of birth: November 10, 1951 (age 74)
- Place of birth: Limache, Chile
- Height: 1.75 m (5 ft 9 in)
- Position: Defender

Senior career*
Years	Team	Apps	(Gls)
1971–1975	CD Everton		
1976–1980	Union Española		
1980–1988	Cobreloa		

International career
1977–1982	Chile	15	(0)
- * Club domestic league appearances and goals

Enzo Sergio Escobar Olivares (born November 10, 1951) is a retired football defender from Chile, who played for Club de Deportes Cobreloa. He represented Chile at the 1982 FIFA World Cup, wearing the number 20 jersey.
