= Juan Espínola (footballer, born 1953) =

Paraguayan footballer

Personal information
- Full name: Juan Gualberto Espínola González
- Date of birth: 12 July 1953 (age 73)
- Place of birth: Asunción, Paraguay
- Height: 1.75 m (5 ft 9 in)
- Position: Right back

Senior career*
Years	Team	Apps	(Gls)
1972–1988	Libertad		

International career
1975–1981	Paraguay	20	(3)
- * Club domestic league appearances and goals

Juan Gualberto Espínola González (born 12 July 1953) is a former Paraguayan football right back. Espínola was a member of Paraguay national team and he won 1979 Copa América with the team.

== Honours ==
=== Club ===
- Libertad
  - Paraguayan Primera División: 1976

=== International ===
- Paraguay
  - Copa América: 1979
