= Milciades Morel =

Paraguayan footballer (born 1953)

Personal information
- Full name: Víctor Milciades Morel Bavera
- Date of birth: 9 September 1953 (age 73)
- Place of birth: Coronel Oviedo, Paraguay
- Height: 1.83 m (6 ft 0 in)
- Position: Striker

Senior career*
Years	Team	Apps	(Gls)
1971-1975	Sportivo Coronel Oviedo		
1976–1979	Libertad		
1979–1981	Espanyol	34	(4)
1982–1984	Luqueño		
1984–1985	Cerro Porteño		
1986–1987	Guarani		
1988	Libertad		
1989–1990	Sportivo Coronel Oviedo		

International career
1977–1983	Paraguay	22	(4)
- * Club domestic league appearances and goals

Víctor Milciades Morel Bavera (born 9 September 1953) is a Paraguayan former football striker.

== Career ==
Morel spent two seasons playing for RCD Espanyol, notably scoring the goal in a 0–1 victory at Hércules which confirmed Espanyol's safety from relegation during the 1979–80 season.

== Honours ==
=== Club ===
- Libertad
  - Paraguayan Primera División: 1976

=== National team ===
- Copa América: 1979
