= Evaristo Isasi =

Paraguayan footballer (born 1955)

Personal information
- Full name: Evaristo Isasi Colmán
- Date of birth: 26 November 1955 (age 70)
- Place of birth: Asunción, Paraguay
- Height: 1.73 m (5 ft 8 in)
- Position: Forward

Senior career*
Years	Team	Apps	(Gls)
1974	General Caballero		
1975–1981	Olimpia Asunción	365	(145)
1982	Deportes Tolima		
1983–1988	Olimpia Asunción		

International career
1977–1981	Paraguay	17	(2)
- * Club domestic league appearances and goals

Evaristo Isasi Colmán (born 26 November 1955) is a Paraguayan former footballer who played as a striker.

== Career ==
He started his career in the youth divisions of his hometown team Club General Artigas of Mariano Roque Alonso. He had brief stints at clubs like Atlético Juventud in 1973 and General Caballero ZC in 1974 before joining Olimpia Asunción where he would spend most of his career and win national and international championships.

== Honours ==
=== Club ===
- Olimpia
  - Paraguayan Primera División: 1975, 1978, 1979, 1980, 1985, 1988
  - Copa Libertadores: 1979
  - Intercontinental Cup: 1979
  - Copa Interamericana: 1979

=== National team ===
- Paraguay
  - Copa América: 1979
