= Osvaldo Domínguez Dibb =

Paraguayan politician, businessman (1940–2024)

- Born: 5 August 1940; Paraguay
- Died: 2 February 2024 (aged 83)
- Occupation: Businessman
- Known for: President of Olimpia Asunción
- Spouse: Peggy Wilson-Smith
- Children: 6, including Alejandro Domínguez

Osvaldo Domínguez Dibb (5 August 1940 – 2 February 2024) was a Paraguayan politician, businessman and the president of Olimpia Asunción.

== Career ==
Domínguez Dibb is mostly known for being the most successful president in the history of Paraguayan association football club Olimpia. He served as president for the terms of 1974 to 1990 and from 1995 to 2004. Under his presidency, Olimpia won a large number of national championships, but most importantly the club won most of its international titles such as three Copa Libertadores, the Intercontinental Cup, the Copa Interamericana and the Recopa Sudamericana. All the mentioned titles catapulted Olimpia as one of the most respected football clubs in South America.

Domínguez Dibb also owned several companies in Paraguay including a newspaper company (Diario La Nación), a radio station (Radio 970 AM), a hotel (Crowne Plaza), a restaurant (Lo de Osvaldo), a real estate firm (karmar), two tobacco factories (tabacalera boqueron) and (tabacalera montecarlo) one of them having a worth of more than 90 million dollars, the only metal bottle cap factory in the country, owner of a luxurious private neighborhood in San Bernardino (Sunset Hills), and more.

Domínguez Dibb was one of the biggest shareholders in many businesses like Cervepar, De la Sobera Group and Coca-Cola in Paraguay. He was also known for having a lot of very valuable ranches and being one of the biggest cattle sellers in the country. Domínguez had several properties around the country and also around Brazil.

In 2002, he lost in the primary elections of the Colorado Party which would have put him as the party representative for the national presidential elections, had he won.

== Criticism ==
Once linked to former dictator Alfredo Stroessner through his brother Humberto Domínguez Dibb (Stroessner's son-in-law), Osvaldo Domínguez Dibb insisted that the Paraguayan general was indeed a great president. Osvaldo Domínguez Dibb was accused by Brazilian authorities of being a major smuggler of cigarettes into Brazil.

== Personal life ==
Osvaldo Domínguez Dibb was born on 5 August 1940. He made most of his money in times of former dictator Alfredo Stroessner.

Domínguez Dibb was married to Peggy Wilson-Smith. Their son is Alejandro Domínguez, president of CONMEBOL, a vice-president of FIFA and a member of the FIFA Executive Committee.

Osvaldo Domínguez Dibb died on 2 February 2024, at the age of 83.
