= Alicio Solalinde =

Paraguayan footballer and coach (born 1952)

Personal information
- Full name: Alicio Ignacio Solalinde Miers
- Date of birth: 1 February 1952 (age 74)
- Place of birth: Villeta, Paraguay
- Position: Right-back

Senior career*
Years	Team	Apps	(Gls)
1971–1977	River Plate Asunción		
1977–1978	Libertad		
1979–1984	Olimpia		

Managerial career
- 1993: Paraguay
- 1998–1999: Deportes Puerto Montt
- 2000–2001: Olimpia
- 2003: 12 de Octubre
- 2003: Olimpia
- 2009: 3 de Febrero
- 2010: Sol de América
- 2011: Sportivo Trinidense
- 2012: Independiente FBC
- 2012: 3 de Febrero
- 2013–2014: Sportivo Luqueño
- 2014: 12 de Octubre
- 2014–2015: Rubio Ñu
- 2015: Deportivo Santaní
- 2016: River Plate Asunción
- 2022–2023: 24 de Setiembre
- * Club domestic league appearances and goals

Alicio Ignacio Solalinde Miers (born February 1, 1952) is a Paraguayan former footballer who played as a forward and works as a coach.

== Career ==
Born in Villeta, Solalinde began playing football for local side Olimpia de Villeta. He also played for Club Libertad and Club River Plate, but enjoyed his greatest success with Club Olimpia where he became a key player by winning several national and international titles such as the Copa Libertadores and Intercontinental Cup in 1979. Solalinde also played for the Paraguay national football team from 1975 to 1981, where he obtained 32 caps and 4 goals. His most important achievement while playing for Paraguay is winning the 1979 Copa América.

After retiring from professional football, Solalinde became a coach and has managed a large number of Paraguayan teams such as Olimpia, Club 12 de Octubre, Club 2 de Mayo, Club Atletico 3 de Febrero and Sportivo Luqueño. He managed Paraguayan Primera División side Independiente F.B.C. in 2012.
