= Osvaldo Aquino =

Paraguayan footballer and coach (1952–2025)

Personal information
- Full name: Osvaldo Nicolás Aquino
- Date of birth: 28 January 1952
- Place of birth: San Lorenzo, Paraguay
- Date of death: 9 July 2025 (aged 73)
- Height: 1.69 m (5 ft 7 in)
- Positions: Midfielder; winger

Youth career
- 1968: Atlético Triunfo
- 1969–1970: San Lorenzo

Senior career*
Years	Team	Apps	(Gls)
1971	San Lorenzo		
1972	Club Manuel Cabello		
1973	Guaraní		
1974–1984	Olimpia Asunción		
1985	San Lorenzo		
1985	Cerro Corá		

International career
- Paraguay
- * Club domestic league appearances and goals

Osvaldo Nicolás Aquino (28 January 1952 – 9 July 2025) was a Paraguayan football player and coach who played as a midfielder or winger.

== Playing career ==
Aquino started his career in the youth divisions of Atlético Triunfo and played for several other teams from the San Lorenzo area before signing for Guaraní of the Paraguayan 1st division in 1973. In 1974, he was signed by Olimpia Asunción, where he became one of the most emblematic players of the club by winning several national and international championships in his 10-year career at the club. Aquino's highlights at Olimpia include scoring the first goal in the Copa Libertadores 1979 final against Boca Juniors, winning the Intercontinental Cup in 1979 and winning six consecutive Paraguayan 1st division titles from 1978 to 1983. He finished his career in 1985, playing for San Lorenzo and Cerro Corá.

Aquino was also part of the Paraguay national team that won the Copa America 1979.

== Managerial career ==
Aquino received his certification in 1989, and some of his coaching jobs included managing the youth divisions of San Lorenzo, being the head coach of Atlético Triunfo and being a member of the technical staff of Club Libertad in 2001 and 2002.

== Illness and death ==
Aquino later suffered from Alzheimer's disease. He died on 9 July 2025, at the age of 73.

== Honours ==
Club Manuel Cabello

- Liga de Carapeguá: 1972

Olimpia Asunción

- Intercontinental Cup: 1979
- Copa Interamericana: 1979
- Copa Libertadores: 1979
- Paraguayan Primera División (7): 1975, 1978, 1979, 1980, 1981, 1982, 1983

Paraguay

- Copa América: 1979

Paraguay youth

- South American Youth Championship: 1971

Individual

- ‘'López de Filippi'’ medal (best Olimpia player of the year): 1976
