= Carlos Kiese =

Paraguayan football coach and journalist

Personal information
- Full name: Carlos Alberto Kiese Wiesner
- Date of birth: 1 June 1957 (age 69)
- Place of birth: Tebicuary, Paraguay
- Height: 1.78 m (5 ft 10 in)
- Position: Defensive midfielder

Senior career*
Years	Team	Apps	(Gls)
1976–1980	Olimpia		
1980	Grêmio		
1980–1981	Independiente		
1982–1983	Olimpia		
1984	Libertad		
1986–1987	Cerro Porteño		

International career
1979–1983	Paraguay	10	(0)

Managerial career
- 1991: Paraguay
- 1993–1994: River Plate Asunción
- 1995: Libertad
- 1996–1997: Cerro Porteño
- 1999: América
- 2001: Libertad
- 2003: Sport Colombia
- 2004–2005: Olimpia
- 2007: Sportivo Carapeguá
- 2009: Olimpia
- 2010: Tacuary
- 2012: Sportivo Luqueño
Medal record
Representing Paraguay
Winner	Copa América	1979
- * Club domestic league appearances and goals

Carlos Alberto Kiese Wiesner (born 1 June 1957) is a former football coach and sports journalist who served as Paraguay's defensive midfielder.

== Playing career ==
As a player, was highlighted in the Selection of Paraguay and the Club Olimpia of his country to win both, between 1975 and 1983, several local and international titles, such as Copa America, Copa Libertadores and Intercontinental Cup from 1979.

== Managerial career ==
In his role as coach, they won the championship in the Primera División, 1996 leading to Club Cerro Porteño from Assumption. Recently, during the Clausura 2009 he served as head coach of Olimpia Asunción of Paraguay. However, resigned over a disagreement with the policy of playing just before the 19th day he found his team in third place 3 points behind the leader.
