= List of Intercontinental Cup matches =

Intercontinental Cup
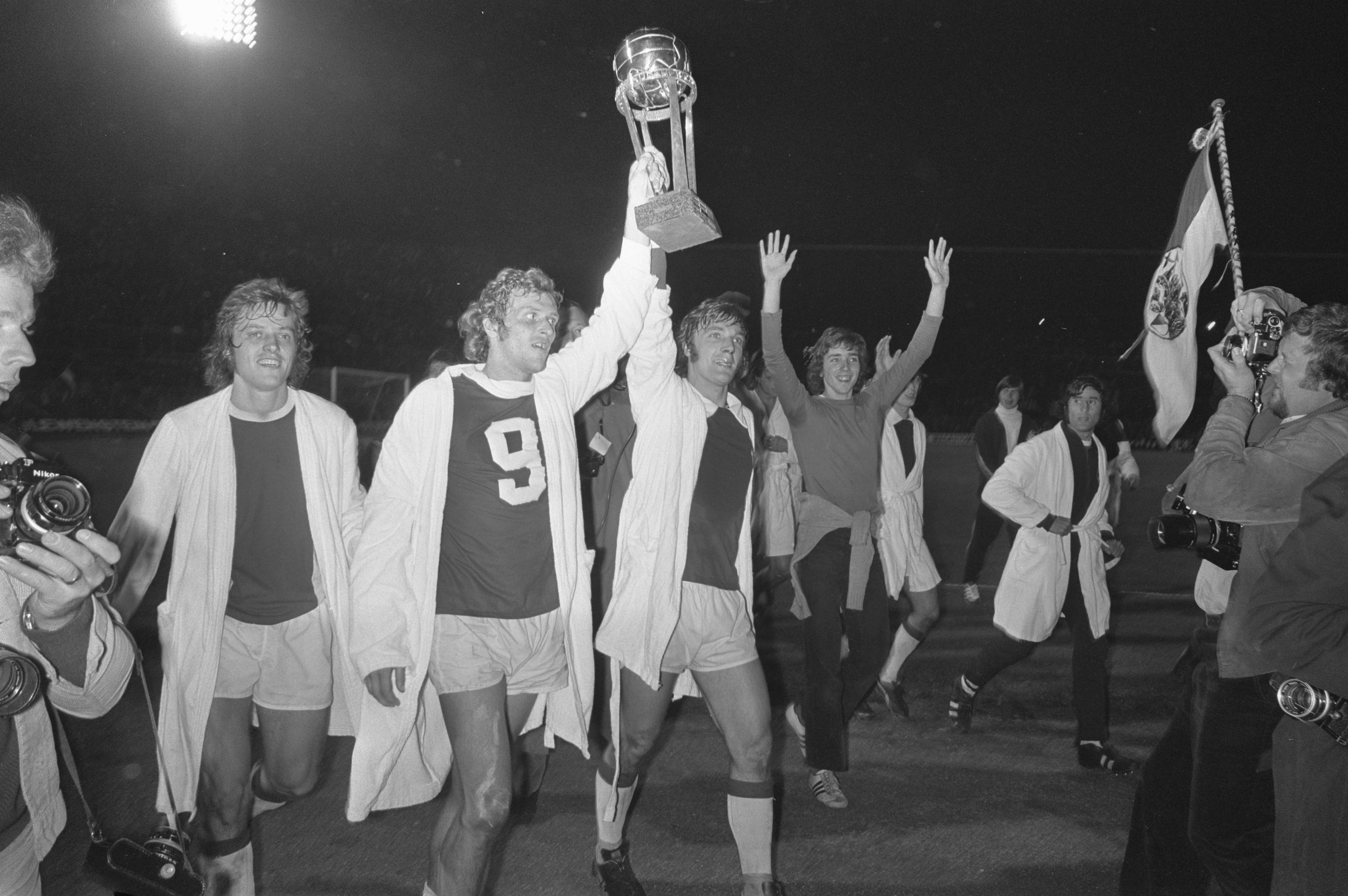
- Ajax players celebrate winning the Intercontinental Cup in 1972
- Founded: 1960
- Abolished: 2004
- Region: Europe (UEFA); South America (CONMEBOL)
- Teams: 2
- Last champions: (Portugal) Porto (2nd title)
- Most championships: (Uruguay) Nacional (Uruguay) Peñarol (Argentina) Boca Juniors (Spain) Real Madrid (Italy) Milan (3 titles each)

The Intercontinental Cup was an association football club competition contested annually from 1960 to 2004 between the winners of the European Cup and the South American Copa Libertadores. The competition was endorsed by both the Union of European Football Associations (UEFA) and the Confederación Sudamericana de Fútbol (CONMEBOL) and, until 1979, it was played over two legs. From 1980, its format was changed to a single match traditionally held in Tokyo, Japan, due to its new sponsorship. The Intercontinental Cup was discontinued in 2004 in favour of the FIFA Club World Cup, which includes the champion clubs from all of the Fédération Internationale de Football Association (FIFA) member confederations.

In its first nine editions, the competition's winner was decided on a points system; if necessary, a play-off match would be held to determine the outcome in the event of a draw. In 1968, the system was changed so that aggregate score would dictate the winning club. The away goals rule was applied if the tie was level after both legs.

Nacional and Peñarol (Uruguay), Boca Juniors (Argentina), Real Madrid (Spain), and Milan (Italy) hold the record for the most victories, each team having won the competition three times; Milan and Independiente (Argentina) have the most runner-up places (four). Overall, 25 different clubs won the competition during its 45 editions. Argentinian clubs won the most cups, with nine trophies among them; Italian clubs won the second most (seven), and Brazilian and Uruguayan teams are third with six victories each. The most successful confederation is CONMEBOL, teams representing the confederation having won the competition 22 times and been runners-up 21 times. Teams representing the European football confederation UEFA have won the competition 21 times and been runners-up 22 times. The last Intercontinental Cup was won by 2004 European champions Porto of Portugal, who beat Colombian side Once Caldas by 8–7 in a penalty shootout, after the match finished 0–0.

== Winners ==
Key
‡	Finals decided in a playoff
*	Match decided by a penalty shootout after extra time
†	Match went to extra time
♦	Indicates the winner in two-leg matches

=== Matches over two legs ===
Intercontinental Cup matches over two legs
Year	Country	Home team	Score	Away team	Country	Venue	Attendance
1960	Uruguay	Peñarol	0–0	Real Madrid^{♦}	Spain	Estadio Centenario	n/a
1960	Spain	Real Madrid^{♦}	5–1	Peñarol	Uruguay	Santiago Bernabéu	100,000
1960	Real Madrid won with 3 points						
1961	Portugal	Benfica	1–0	Peñarol^{♦}	Uruguay	Estádio da Luz	n/a
1961	Uruguay	Peñarol^{♦}	5–0	Benfica	Portugal	Estadio Centenario	n/a
1961	2 points each; Peñarol won 2–1 in the playoff at Estadio Centenario ‡						
1962	Brazil	Santos^{♦}	3–2	Benfica	Portugal	Estádio do Maracanã	n/a
1962	Portugal	Benfica	2–5	Santos^{♦}	Brazil	Estádio da Luz	73,000
1962	Santos won with 4 points						
1963	Italy	Milan	4–2	Santos^{♦}	Brazil	San Siro	n/a
1963	Brazil	Santos^{♦}	4–2	Milan	Italy	Estádio do Maracanã	150,000
1963	2 points each; Santos won 1–0 in the playoff at Estádio do Maracanã ‡						
1964	Argentina	Independiente	1–0	Inter Milan^{♦}	Italy	Doble Visera	n/a
1964	Italy	Inter Milan^{♦}	2–0	Independiente	Argentina	San Siro	n/a
1964	2 points each; Inter Milan won 1–0 in the playoff at Santiago Bernabéu ‡						
1965	Italy	Inter Milan^{♦}	3–0	Independiente	Argentina	San Siro	75,000
1965	Argentina	Independiente	0–0	Inter Milan^{♦}	Italy	Doble Visera	80,000
1965	Inter Milan won with 3 points						
1966	Uruguay	Peñarol^{♦}	2–0	Real Madrid	Spain	Estadio Centenario	n/a
1966	Spain	Real Madrid	0–2	Peñarol^{♦}	Uruguay	Santiago Bernabéu	n/a
1966	Peñarol won with 4 points						
1967	Scotland	Celtic	1–0	Racing^{♦}	Argentina	Hampden Park	103,000
1967	Argentina	Racing^{♦}	2–1	Celtic	Scotland	El Cilindro	n/a
1967	2 points each; Racing Club won 1–0 in the playoff at Estadio Centenario ‡						
1968	Argentina	Estudiantes^{♦}	1–0	Manchester United	England	La Bombonera	25,134
1968	England	Manchester United	1–1	Estudiantes^{♦}	Argentina	Old Trafford	n/a
1968	Estudiantes won with 3 points						
1969	Italy	Milan^{♦}	3–0	Estudiantes	Argentina	San Siro	n/a
1969	Argentina	Estudiantes	2–1	Milan^{♦}	Italy	La Bombonera	n/a
1969	Milan won 4–2 on aggregate						
1970	Argentina	Estudiantes	2–2	Feyenoord^{♦}	Netherlands	La Bombonera	n/a
1970	Netherlands	Feyenoord^{♦}	1–0	Estudiantes	Argentina	De Kuip	n/a
1970	Feyenoord won 3–2 on aggregate						
1971 (Note: European Cup winners Ajax declined to participate and were replaced by runners-up Panathinakos.)	Greece	Panathinaikos	1–1	Nacional^{♦}	Uruguay	Karaiskakis Stadium	60,000
1971	Uruguay	Nacional^{♦}	2–1	Panathinaikos	Greece	Estadio Centenario	60,000
1971	Nacional won 3–2 on aggregate						
1972	Argentina	Independiente	1–1	Ajax^{♦}	Netherlands	Estadio Almirante Cordero	n/a
1972	Netherlands	Ajax^{♦}	3–0	Independiente	Argentina	Olympic Stadium	n/a
1972	Ajax won 4–1 on aggregate						
1973 (Note: European Cup winners Ajax declined to participate and were replaced by runners-up Juventus. Only one leg was played.)	Italy	Juventus	0–1	Independiente^{♦}	Argentina	Stadio Olimpico	22,489
1973	Argentina	Independiente^{♦}	n/a	Juventus	Italy	Estadio Almirante Cordero	n/a
1973	Independiente won 1–0 on aggregate						
1974 (Note: European Cup winners Bayern Munich declined to participate and were replaced by runners-up Atlético Madrid.)	Argentina	Independiente	1–0	Atlético Madrid^{♦}	Spain	Estadio Almirante Cordero	60,000
1974	Spain	Atlético Madrid^{♦}	2–0	Independiente	Argentina	Vicente Calderón	65,000
1974	Atlético Madrid won 2–1 on aggregate						
1975	Not played Qualifying teams: (West Germany) Bayern Munich, (Argentina) Independiente. (Note: The 1975 competition was not held as Bayern Munich and Independiente could not decide on dates to play.)						
1976	West Germany	Bayern Munich^{♦}	2–0	Cruzeiro	Brazil	Olympiastadion	22,000
1976	Brazil	Cruzeiro	0–0	Bayern Munich^{♦}	West Germany	Mineirão	117,000
1976	Bayern Munich won 2–0 on aggregate						
1977 (Note: European Cup winners Liverpool declined to participate and were replaced by runners-up Borussia Mönchengladbach.)	Argentina	Boca Juniors^{♦}	2–2	Borussia Mönchengladbach	West Germany	La Bombonera	60,000
1977	West Germany	Borussia Mönchengladbach	0–3	Boca Juniors^{♦}	Argentina	Wildparkstadion	38,000
1977	Boca Juniors won 5–2 on aggregate						
1978	Not played Qualifying teams: (Argentina) Boca Juniors, (England) Liverpool. (Note: The 1978 competition was not held as Boca Juniors and Liverpool declined to play each other.)						
1979 (Note: European Cup winners Nottingham Forest declined to participate and were replaced by runners-up Malmö FF.)	Sweden	Malmö FF	0–1	Olimpia^{♦}	Paraguay	Malmö Stadion	4,811
1979	Paraguay	Olimpia^{♦}	2–1	Malmö FF	Sweden	Estadio Defensores del Chaco	35,000
1979	Olimpia won 3–1 on aggregate						

=== Single-leg matches ===
Single-leg Intercontinental Cup matches
Year	Country	Winners	Score	Runners-up	Country	Venue	Attendance	Notes
1980	Uruguay	Nacional	1–0	Nottingham Forest	England	National Stadium	62,000	
1981	Brazil	Flamengo	3–0	Liverpool	England	National Stadium	62,000	
1982	Uruguay	Peñarol	2–0	Aston Villa	England	National Stadium	63,000	
1983	Brazil	Grêmio	2–1^{†}	Hamburger SV	West Germany	National Stadium	62,000	
1984	Argentina	Independiente	1–0	Liverpool	England	National Stadium	62,000	
1985	Italy	Juventus	2–2^{*}	Argentinos Juniors	Argentina	National Stadium	62,000	(Note: Juventus won 4–2 in a penalty shootout.)
1986	Argentina	River Plate	1–0	Steaua București	Romania	National Stadium	62,000	
1987	Portugal	Porto	2–1^{†}	Peñarol	Uruguay	National Stadium	45,000	
1988	Uruguay	Nacional	2–2^{*}	PSV Eindhoven	Netherlands	National Stadium	62,000	(Note: Nacional won 7–6 in a penalty shootout.)
1989	Italy	Milan	1–0^{†}	Atlético Nacional	Colombia	National Stadium	60,228	
1990	Italy	Milan	3–0	Olimpia	Paraguay	National Stadium	60,228	
1991	Yugoslavia	Red Star Belgrade	3–0	Colo-Colo	Chile	National Stadium	60,000	
1992	Brazil	São Paulo	2–1	Barcelona	Spain	National Stadium	60,000	
1993	Brazil	São Paulo	3–2	Milan	Italy	National Stadium	52,275	
1994	Argentina	Vélez Sarsfield	2–0	Milan	Italy	National Stadium	47,886	
1995	Netherlands	Ajax	0–0^{*}	Grêmio	Brazil	National Stadium	47,129	(Note: Ajax won 4–3 in a penalty shootout.)
1996	Italy	Juventus	1–0	River Plate	Argentina	National Stadium	48,305	
1997	Germany	Borussia Dortmund	2–0	Cruzeiro	Brazil	National Stadium	46,953	
1998	Spain	Real Madrid	2–1	Vasco da Gama	Brazil	National Stadium	51,514	
1999	England	Manchester United	1–0	Palmeiras	Brazil	National Stadium	53,372	
2000	Argentina	Boca Juniors	2–1	Real Madrid	Spain	National Stadium	52,511	
2001	Germany	Bayern Munich	1–0^{†}	Boca Juniors	Argentina	National Stadium	53,360	
2002	Spain	Real Madrid	2–0	Olimpia	Paraguay	International Stadium Yokohama	66,070	
2003	Argentina	Boca Juniors	1–1^{*}	Milan	Italy	International Stadium Yokohama	66,757	(Note: Boca Juniors won 3–1 in a penalty shootout.)
2004	Portugal	Porto	0–0^{*}	Once Caldas	Colombia	International Stadium Yokohama	45,748	(Note: Porto won 8–7 in a penalty shootout.)

== Performances ==
=== By club ===
Intercontinental Cup results by club
Team	Winners	Runners-up	Years won	Years runner-up
(Italy) Milan	3	4	1969, 1989, 1990	1963, 1993, 1994, 2003
(Spain) Real Madrid	3	2	1960, 1998, 2002	1966, 2000
(Uruguay) Peñarol	3	2	1961, 1966, 1982	1960, 1987
(Argentina) Boca Juniors	3	1	1977, 2000, 2003	2001
(Uruguay) Nacional	3	0	1971, 1980, 1988	—
(Argentina) Independiente	2	4	1973, 1984	1964, 1965, 1972, 1974
(Italy) Juventus	2	1	1985, 1996	1973
(Brazil) Santos	2	0	1962, 1963	—
(Italy) Inter Milan	2	0	1964, 1965	—
(Netherlands) Ajax	2	0	1972, 1995	—
(Germany) Bayern Munich	2	0	1976, 2001	—
(Portugal) Porto	2	0	1987, 2004	—
(Brazil) São Paulo	2	0	1992, 1993	—
(Argentina) Estudiantes	1	2	1968	1969, 1970
(Paraguay) Olimpia	1	2	1979	1990, 2002
(Brazil) Grêmio	1	1	1983	1995
(Argentina) River Plate	1	1	1986	1996
(England) Manchester United	1	1	1999	1968
(Argentina) Racing	1	0	1967	—
(Netherlands) Feyenoord	1	0	1970	—
(Spain) Atlético Madrid	1	0	1974	—
(Brazil) Flamengo	1	0	1981	—
(Serbia) Red Star Belgrade (Note: As a representative of Yugoslavia in 1991.)	1	0	1991	—
(Argentina) Vélez Sarsfield	1	0	1994	—
(Germany) Borussia Dortmund	1	0	1997	—
(Portugal) Benfica	0	2	—	1961, 1962
(Brazil) Cruzeiro	0	2	—	1976, 1997
(England) Liverpool	0	2	—	1981, 1984
(Scotland) Celtic	0	1	—	1967
(Greece) Panathinaikos	0	1	—	1971
(West Germany) Borussia Mönchengladbach	0	1	—	1977
(Sweden) Malmö FF	0	1	—	1979
(England) Nottingham Forest	0	1	—	1980
(England) Aston Villa	0	1	—	1982
(West Germany) Hamburger SV	0	1	—	1983
(Argentina) Argentinos Juniors	0	1	—	1985
(Romania) Steaua București	0	1	—	1986
(Netherlands) PSV Eindhoven	0	1	—	1988
(Colombia) Atlético Nacional	0	1	—	1989
(Chile) Colo-Colo	0	1	—	1991
(Spain) Barcelona	0	1	—	1992
(Brazil) Vasco da Gama	0	1	—	1998
(Brazil) Palmeiras	0	1	—	1999
(Colombia) Once Caldas	0	1	—	2004

=== By country ===
Intercontinental Cup results by country
Nation	Winners	Runners-up
Argentina	9	9
Italy	7	5
Brazil	6	5
Uruguay	6	2
Spain	4	3
Germany (Note: Includes clubs representing West Germany. No clubs representing East Germany appeared in a match.)	3	2
Netherlands	3	1
Portugal	2	2
England	1	5
Paraguay	1	2
Yugoslavia (Note: The Yugoslav appearance was by a club from SR Serbia.)	1	0
Colombia	0	2
Scotland	0	1
Greece	0	1
Sweden	0	1
Romania	0	1
Chile	0	1

=== By confederation ===
Intercontinental Cup winners by confederation
Confederation	Titles	Runners-up
CONMEBOL	22	21
UEFA	21	22
Total	43	43

== See also ==
- List of European Cup and UEFA Champions League finals
- List of Intercontinental Cup winning managers
- List of FIFA Club World Cup finals
- List of Copa Libertadores finals

== Bibliography ==
- Vonnard, Philippe (2020). Creating a United Europe of Football. Palgrave Macmillan. doi:10.1007/978-3-030-42343-8. ISBN 978-3-030-42343-8.
