= Club Olimpia =

Paraguayan sports club

Olimpia
- Full name: Club Olimpia
- Nicknames: El Decano (The Dean); Rey de Copas (The King of Cups); El Expreso Decano (The Express Dean); La "O" (The "O"); El Tricampeón de América (The Triple Champion of America)
- Founded: July 25, 1902; 124 years ago
- Ground: Estadio Osvaldo Domínguez Dibb
- Capacity: 32,000
- Chairman: Rodrigo Nogués
- Manager: Vitamina Sánchez
- League: División de Honor
- 2025: División de Honor, 7th of 12
- Website: clubolimpia.com.py
Home colours	Away colours

Club Olimpia is a Paraguayan professional sports club based in the city of Asunción. It promotes the practice of various sports, with most importance given to the football, rugby and basketball sides, football being the most successful.

Founded in 1902, the club's name stems from the idea of its principal founding member, William Paats, a Dutchman based in Paraguay, who is considered the father of Paraguayan football. Internationally, the club is referred to as Olimpia Asunción in order to distinguish it from other Latin American football clubs of the same name.

Olimpia has won a record 48 Primera División titles to date, including a unique record run of winning the league six consecutive times. The only Paraguayan club to win a CONMEBOL title, Olimpia has won three Copa Libertadores — and has been runner-up four times — as well as two Recopa Sudamericanas, one Intercontinental Cup, one Copa Interamericana, and one Supercopa Sudamericana, a competition it won automatically in 1991. In 1979 it achieved the "quadruple", the rare feat of winning all possible official titles on offer that year: the Paraguayan championship, the Copa Libertadores, the Copa Interamericana and the Intercontinental Cup. They have also never been relegated.

Olimpia contests the Paraguayan football derby (clásico) with Cerro Porteño, the "clásico añejo" (Old Derby) with Guaraní, and the "black and white derby" with Libertad.

Olimpia played their home games at the Estadio Osvaldo Domínguez Dibb, also known as "El Bosque" (The Forest) and "Para Uno", before the demolition of the venue. They moved to the Estadio Defensores del Chaco after the demolition. Basketball and other sports, have their own sports centre named after former president Osvaldo Dominguez Dibb as well, in the same site as the stadium in the Mariscal López neighborhood.

== History ==
=== Foundation ===
On November 23, 1901, before the formation of Club Olimpia, William Paats organized a first match between two teams of his students which then made young people to be eager to develop a sport team in Paraguay. Olimpia was founded on July 25, 1902, being the oldest football team in Paraguay. The club was founded by Dutchman William Paats, along with Paraguayans Sila Godoi, Fernando S. Pascual, José E. Torres, Gustavo M. Crovatto, Héctor Cabañas, Juan Rodi, Antonio Pedraza, Luis Marecos, Juan Mara and Genaro Gutiérrez Yegros. The act of foundation was written in the Rodi's family home, located in the streets of Azara and Independencia Nacional in downtown Asunción, Paraguay. That evening, three names for the club were suggested: Paraguay, Esparta and Olimpia. The final decision came to William Paats who chose "Club Olimpia" as the team official name, in honor of the Greek city of Olympia where the Olympic Games were born.

The original kit was composed of a black shirt with the word "Olimpia" written in white across the chest and white shorts. Later, white and black were adopted as the colours for the team, with a white shirt with a horizontal black stripe. The alternate jersey is black with a white stripe, though in 2008 the stripe is vertical.

=== The early years (1902–1950) ===
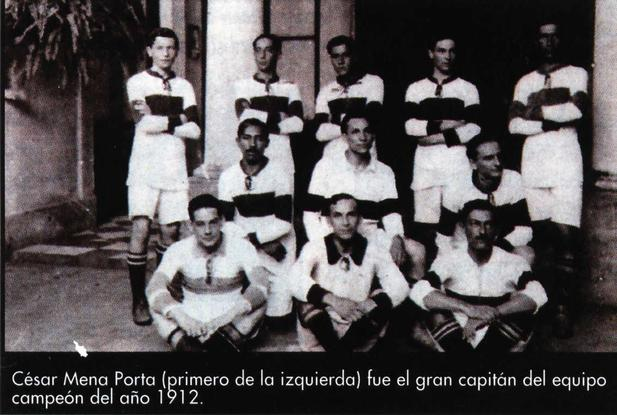
The team that won its first Primera División championship in 1912.

The first national championship in Paraguay was played in 1906, after the foundation of the Paraguayan Football Association (APF). It was not until 1912 that Olimpia won a championship, facing Sol de América in the final. In that same year, Olimpia's biggest rival, Cerro Porteño, was founded.

After a few championships won during the 1910s, Olimpia's next big accomplishment were the three championships in a row in 1927, 1928, 1929 becoming the first Paraguayan team to win three consecutive titles. Olimpia repeated the same feat by becoming champions in 1936, 1937, 1938. The 1940s presented a rough time for Olimpia with bad results for most of the decade; but despite that Olimpia won two titles (1947 and 1948).

=== The start of dominance (1950–1975) ===
After the unpleasant times in the 1940s decade Olimpia started to establish its dominance in the Paraguayan league when Manuel Ferreira Sosa assumed the presidency of the club in the mid-1950s. During Ferreira's presidency the football stadium, then named Estadio Manuel Ferreira, was built. However, the most important accomplishment made by Ferreira was the acquisition of several key players that led Olimpia to a record five consecutive championships, from 1956 to 1960 (with an undefeated championship in 1959).

The club also had a first taste of international success in 1960 in the first edition of the Copa Libertadores de América by reaching the finals in which they lost to Peñarol. Ironically, the winning goal for Peñarol in the finals was scored by Uruguayan Luis Cubilla, who later became a coach and led Olimpia to several national and international championships.

=== The golden years (1975–1986) ===
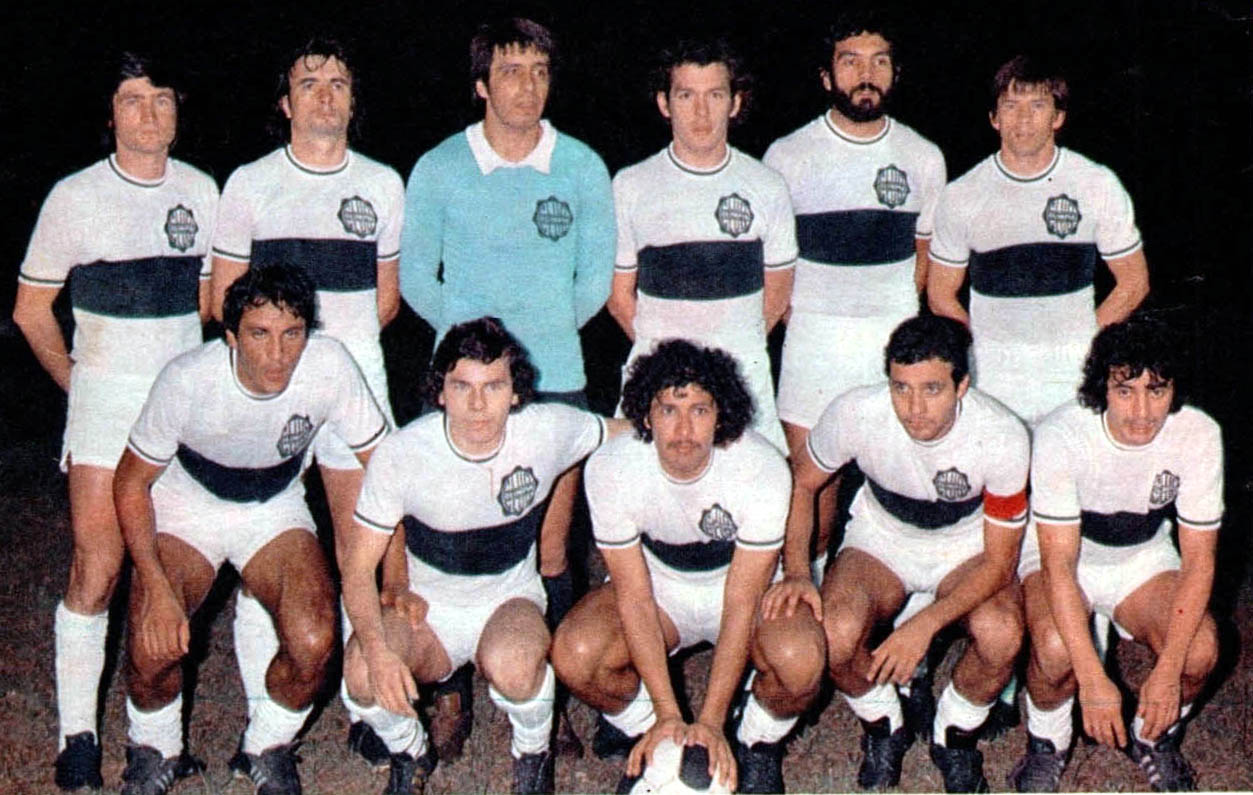
An Olimpia squad in 1979

The election of new club president Osvaldo Domínguez Dibb in 1975 is a key part in Olimpia's history. The new president hired coach Luis Cubilla, who led Olimpia to its first international cup title when the club defeated Boca Juniors of Argentina in the 1979 Copa Libertadores finals. In the first leg game played in Asunción Olimpia won 2–0. That result allowed Olimpia to play their effective defensive scheme in the famous La Bombonera stadium in the second leg, ending the match in a 0–0 draw that gave the Paraguayan side its first Copa Libertadores.

In that same year, Olimpia won the Copa Interamericana by defeating FAS of El Salvador by an aggregate of 8–3 (first leg result: 3–3, second leg result: 5–0) and the Intercontinental Cup by defeating the UEFA Champions League runner-up Malmö of Sweden 3–1 on aggregate.

Olimpia's success was not limited to the international scene: from 1978 to 1983 the team won a record six-straight Paraguayan league championships (beating their own record set in 1956–60 of five consecutive titles).

=== Continued success (1986–2000) ===
After the 1979 Copa Libertadores win, fans were starving for more continental success. For that matter, the club's president, Osvaldo Dominguez Dibb, decided to make a financial effort to bring Raul Vicente Amarilla, a Paraguayan striker that had proven his quality in the Spanish league over the years.

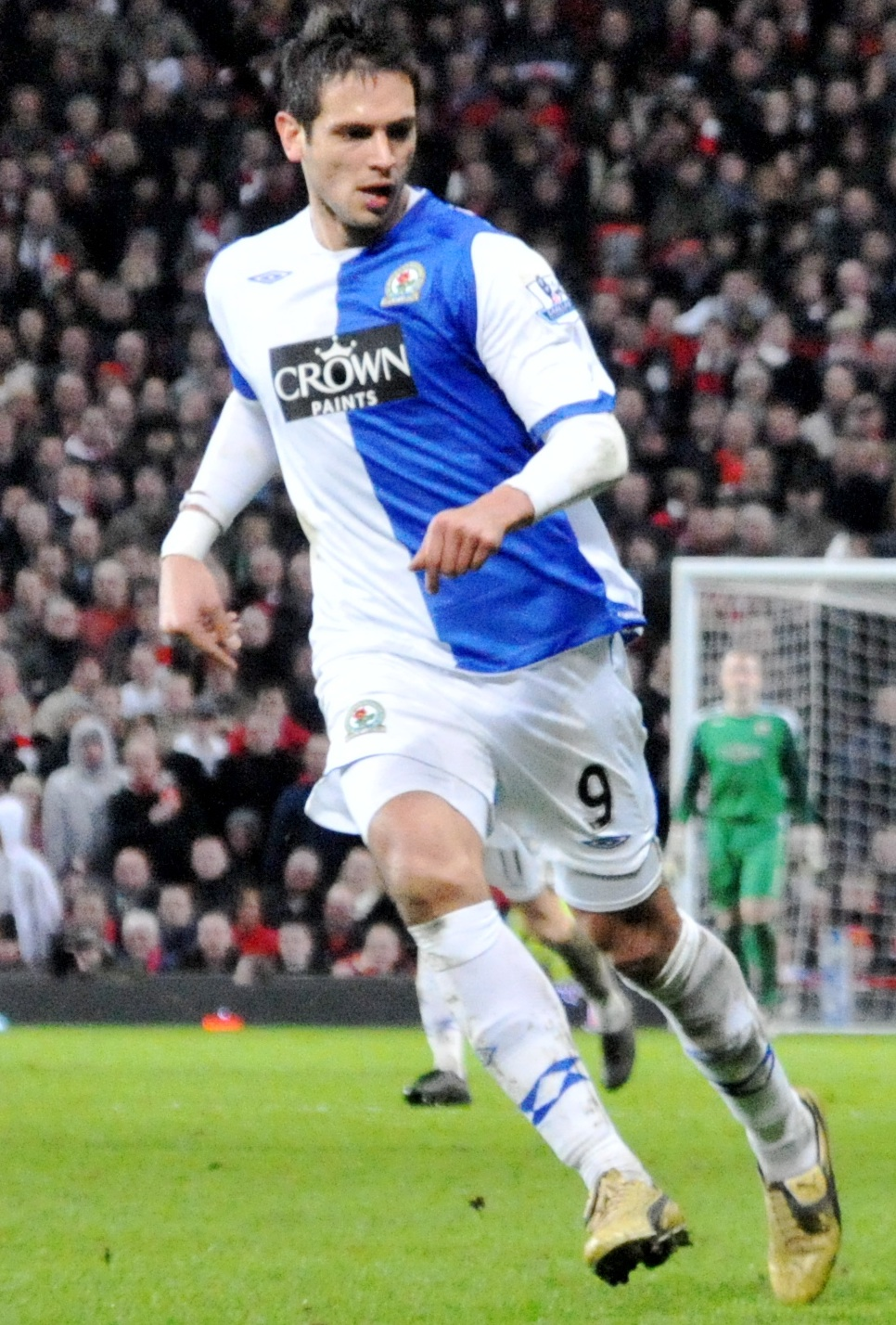
Roque Santa Cruz, pictured with Blackburn Rovers in 2009, debuted for Olimpia in 1997 and won consecutive trophies with the club.

The signing of Oscar Amarilla was as positive for Olimpia as expected, as the team reached the 1989 Copa Libertadores finals but came up short, being defeated by Atlético Nacional. However, it did not take long for Olimpia to take revenge on Atlético Nacional, as they defeated the Colombian side in the semi-finals of the 1990 Copa Libertadores. This semi-final victory allowed Olimpia to play the finals against Barcelona de Guayaquil, beating the Ecuadorians 2–0 in the first leg played in Asunción, and tying 1–1 in Ecuador. This way Olimpia obtained its second Libertadores Cup with a 3–1 aggregate scoreline and a formidable team that had key players such as Almeida, Gabriel González, Samaniego, Amarilla among others.

Not content with the Libertadores title itself, Olimpia went on to win the 1990 Supercopa Sudamericana, a tournament reserved only for the best teams in South America. They did this by defeating Nacional de Montevideo in the finals with a 6–3 aggregate score. In that same year, Olimpia played the Intercontinental Cup final in Japan against the European champion AC Milan, losing 3–0. Because Olimpia won both the Libertadores and Supercopa in the same year, they automatically won the 1990 Recopa Sudamericana. The achievement of all the mentioned international titles in 1979 and 1990 established Olimpia as one of the most respected and traditional teams in South American football. In 1991 Olimpia reached the Copa Libertadores finals for the third time in a row but lost against Colo-Colo 3–0. Amongst other trophies won by Olimpia at the time, the club were crowned undefeated champions of the 1992 Torneo República, with Roberto Perfumo as team manager.

From 1994 to 1999, Olimpia would produce the debut of several youth team graduates and future national team players, such as Richart Baez (1993), Denis Caniza (1994), Carlos Humberto Paredes (1996), Roque Santa Cruz (1997), Ruben Maldonado (1997) and Julio César Caceres (1999). Baez was transferred to J1 League club Avispa Fukuoka whilst Santa Cruz, Paredes, Maldonado and Caceres were transferred to UEFA clubs. Five of the six players went on to play at FIFA World Cup tournaments for Paraguay. Olimpia also had won league titles in 1993 and 1995 and then four back-to-back titles from 1997 to 2000.

=== Centenary and present (2000–present) ===
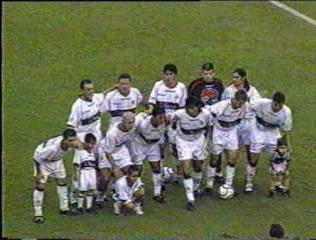
Olimpia squad during a 2002 Copa Libertadores match.

On 25 July 2002 Olimpia celebrated its centenary, which was also the year where the club obtained its third Copa Libertadores. Having defeated Once Caldas and Universidad Católica in the first round, Olimpia beat Cobreloa in the round of 16, and then went on to overcome defending champions Boca Juniors in the quarter-finals. In the semi-finals, Olimpia overcame Grêmio on penalties. In the finals, the team led by coach Nery Pumpido defeated Brazilian side São Caetano 4–2 in a penalty shoot-out after an aggregate score of 2–2 in both legs and winning the finals. Olimpia's base formation for the tournament was with Ricardo Tavarelli in goal; Néstor Isasi, Julio César Cáceres, Nelson Zelaya and Henrique da Silva in defense; Sergio Orteman, Victor Quintana, Julio Enciso and Gastón Córdoba in midfield; and Miguel Benítez and Richart Báez (later Hernán Rodrigo López) in the front.

Olimpia also won the 2002 Recopa Sudamericana by defeating San Lorenzo of Argentina 2–0 in the final played in Los Angeles. As in 1990, Olimpia lost the Intercontinental Cup final, this time against Real Madrid by a score of 0–2.

A deep slump followed the successful international period of 2002–03. Olimpia failed to qualify for the Copa Libertadores consistently in the following years, and finished last in the 2004 Clausura and 2005 Apertura. Things improved in the 2005 Clausura, with Olimpia finishing 3rd. Oscar Scavone was president from 2004–2006.

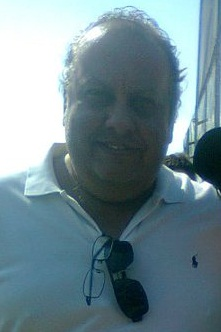
Marcelo Recanate, former president of Club Olimpia.

At the beginning of the 2007 Apertura season, Paraguayan legend José Cardozo took the helm as coach. His tenure did not last long, as Olimpia were unable to win the championship. For the Clausura tournament, former star player Alicio Solalinde was back at the helm. Though his record was not bad, he was replaced by Carlos Jara Saguier halfway through the tournament. This sparked a lot of controversy, as Saguier was a former player of Cerro Porteño, and an admitted fan of that club. Olimpia finished third in the Clausura tournament, behind Libertad and Cerro Porteño. A fourth-place finish in the annual table (adding both Apertura and Clausura tournaments) allowed Olimpia to return to international play after 4 years of absence with the 2008 Copa Sudamericana.

2008 was a very poor year for the club. In the Torneo Apertura, they finished 8th, and in the Torneo Clausura, they finished 7th, not good enough to qualify for any continental tournaments. In the Copa Sudamericana Olimpia were eliminated in the second stage, after losing the first leg 4-0 to Universidad Catolica. El Decano showed a small improvement for 2010, finishing 4th in the Apertura and 5th in the Clausura, good enough to qualify for the 2010 Copa Sudamericana with a 4th placed finish in the aggregate table.

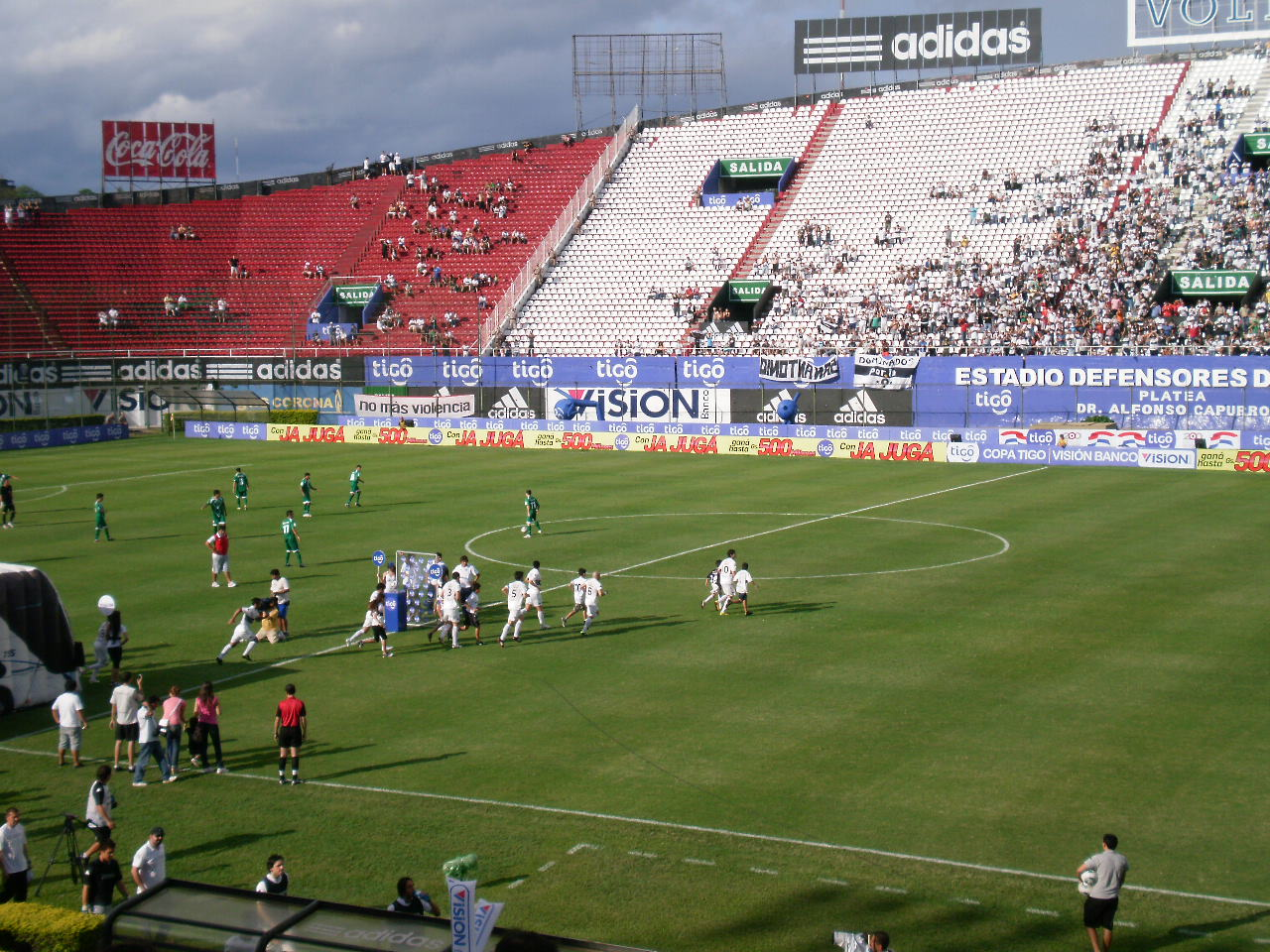
Olimpia in a fixture against 3 de Febrero at the Defensores del Chaco in 2011.

The year 2011 started off great for the club. A total of twelve new players were incorporated to the first squad The first squad began the Apertura 2011 with seven victories in a row, and ended the first round in 2nd place with 42 points. The number of active fan members of the club was triplicated just in three months, and that they are still increasing because of the team's great performance Nery Pumpido resigned after the Apertura, where he finished runner-up with 42 points.

On 18 December 2011, Olimpia obtained its 39th national league title by winning the 2011 Clausura after eleven years, the longest period without obtaining a national championship. The title came after defeating Rubio Ñu 2–1 at the Estadio Defensores del Chaco and finishing three points ahead of Cerro Porteño. The title was largely celebrated due to the way it was won with Olimpia having only a one-point lead over rivals Cerro until the last matchday. Other reasons why it was an unexpected title are that Olimpia had lost many key players to injuries, internal arguments with Chairman Recanate (later solved) and heavy criticism by other teams's fans about controversial calls made in favor of Olimpia.

Olimpia participated in the 2012 Copa Libertadores and Copa Sudamericana as the "number one competitor" of Paraguay. However, their campaigns in both cups were underwhelming, as they were eliminated in the group stage and second round respectively.

In the 2012 Apertura Olimpia finished third in the league's aggregate table and qualified for the 2013 Copa Libertadores first stage. Their campaign began with a 2-0 aggregate win against Defensor Sporting. Olimpia's first group stage match ended in a 3-1 loss to Newell's Old Boys. However, the club didn't lose any more matches after that one, with highlights being a 5-1 away win against Deportivo Lara and a 4-1 home win against Newell's to finish as group leader with 13 points. In the round of 16, Olimpia beat 2012 Copa Sudamericana finalist Tigre 3-2 on aggregate, followed by a 2-1 aggregate victory over Fluminense in the quarter-finals, and a 2-1 victory on aggregate over Santa Fe to reach the finals for the seventh time, a feat which no Brazilian or Colombian team have been able to achieve. However, they lost to Atlético Mineiro in Mineirão 0–2 after winning 2–0 in Asunción and lost the penalty shootout 4–3, with Matías Giménez's penalty hitting the crossbar, ending the dream of a fourth title.

The club won its 40th title in the 2015 Clausura.

Olimpia won the 2018 Apertura, 2018 Clausura, 2019 Apertura, and 2019 Clausura, to win a tetracampeonato (four-time championship).

The club won its first Copa Paraguay in the 2021 edition, beating Sol de America on penalties. That year, they were eliminated from the Copa Libertadores with a 9-2 aggregate loss against Flamengo in the quarter-finals.

In the 2023 Copa Libertadores, Olimpia produced an upset by eliminating defending champions Flamengo in the round of 16, but were then eliminated by Flamengo rivals Fluminense 5-1 on aggregate in the quarter-finals.

== Rivalries ==
Olimpia's most traditional rival is Cerro Porteño. For more than nine decades these two teams represented the "Super Clásico" (super classic) of Paraguayan football. Other "clásicos" of Paraguayan football in which Olimpia takes part are the ones against Guaraní, which is called "el clásico más añejo", (meaning "the oldest derby" ) because they were the first two teams in Paraguay, and against Libertad (Black and White derby). Olimpia also has a very strong rivalry against Club Sportivo Luqueño from the neighboring city of Luque.

== Honours ==
Club Olimpia honours
Type	Competition	Titles	Seasons
National	Primera División	48	1912, 1914, 1916, 1925, 1927, 1928, 1929, 1931, 1936, 1937, 1938, 1947, 1948, 1956, 1957, 1958, 1959, 1960, 1962, 1965, 1968, 1971, 1975, 1978, 1979, 1980, 1981, 1982, 1983, 1985, 1988, 1989, 1993, 1995, 1997, 1998, 1999, 2000, 2011 Clausura, 2015 Clausura, 2018 Apertura, 2018 Clausura, 2019 Apertura, 2019 Clausura, 2020 Clausura, 2022 Clausura, 2024 Clausura, 2026 Apertura
National	Copa Paraguay	1	2021
National	Supercopa Paraguay	1	2021
National	Torneo República	2	1976, 1992
National	Plaqueta Millington Drake	4^{(s)}	1943, 1947, 1948, 1951
International	Copa Libertadores	3	1979, 1990, 2002
International	Recopa Sudamericana	2	1991, 2003
International	Supercopa Sudamericana	1	1990
International	Copa Interamericana	1	1979
Worldwide	Intercontinental Cup	1	1979

- record
- ^{S} shared record

=== Friendly tournaments ===
- Nehru Centenary Cup
  - Winners (1): 1990

== Players ==
=== Squad ===
As of 5 September 2026

Note: Flags indicate national team as defined under FIFA eligibility rules; some limited exceptions apply. Players may hold more than one non-FIFA nationality.

No.	Pos.	Nation	Player
1	GK	PAR	Gastón Olveira
2	DF	URU	Bryan Bentaberry
4	DF	NZL	Tim Payne
5	MF	ARG	Juan Fernando Alfaro
6	MF	PAR	Richard Ortiz (captain)
7	FW	PAR	Fernando Cardozo
8	MF	PAR	Alex Franco
9	FW	PAR	Gabriel Ávalos
10	FW	PAR	Derlis González (vice-captain)
11	FW	PAR	Sebastián Ferreira
12	GK	URU	Sebastián Lentinelly
13	GK	PAR	Lucas Verza
14	DF	PAR	Gustavo Vargas
15	DF	PAR	Mateo Gamarra (on loan from Athletico-PR)
16	MF	PAR	Javier Domínguez
17	FW	PAR	Rodney Redes
18	MF	PAR	Sebastián Quintana

No.	Pos.	Nation	Player
19	MF	PAR	Rubén Lezcano (on loan from Fluminense)
20	MF	PAR	Eduardo Delmas
21	DF	PAR	César Olmedo
22	DF	PAR	Juan Vera
23	DF	CHI	Esteban Matus
24	FW	PAR	Tiago Caballero
26	MF	PAR	Richard Sánchez (on loan from Racing)
27	DF	PAR	Raúl Cáceres
29	FW	PAR	Iván Leguizamón
30	DF	PAR	Alan Rodríguez (on loan from Rosario Central)
31	FW	ARG	Braian Romero
33	FW	PAR	Pedro Zarza
34	FW	PAR	Hugo Sandoval (on loan from Recoleta)
35	FW	ARG	Franco Alfonso
37	FW	PAR	Romeo Benítez (on loan from Athletico-PR)
—	FW	PAR	César Miño

=== Players under contract ===
Note: Flags indicate national team as defined under FIFA eligibility rules; some limited exceptions apply. Players may hold more than one non-FIFA nationality.

No.	Pos.	Nation	Player
41	GK	PAR	Pedro González
45	MF	PAR	Manuel Romero

No.	Pos.	Nation	Player
—	MF	PAR	Ronald Cornet

=== Out on loan ===
Note: Flags indicate national team as defined under FIFA eligibility rules; some limited exceptions apply. Players may hold more than one non-FIFA nationality.

No.	Pos.	Nation	Player
3	DF	PAR	Junior Barreto (at Atlético-GO until 31 December 2026)
32	DF	PAR	Tobías Morínigo (at Sportivo Trinidense until 31 December 2026)
36	MF	PAR	Marcos Gómez (at Guaraní until 31 December 2026)
39	MF	PAR	Luis Abreu (at Sportivo Trinidense until 30 June 2027)

No.	Pos.	Nation	Player
40	GK	PAR	Marino Arzamendia (at Deportivo Riestra until 31 December 2027)
42	DF	PAR	Axel Alfonzo (at Limache until 31 December 2026)
47	FW	PAR	Erik López (at Municipal until 31 December 2026)
—	FW	URU	Faustino Barone (at Sportivo Trinidense until 31 December 2026)

=== Notable players ===
To appear in this section a player must have either:

- Been part of a national team squad at any time.
- Played in the first division of any other football association (outside of Paraguay).
- Played in a continental and/or intercontinental competition.

1970s

- (Paraguay) Ever Hugo Almeida (1973–91)
- (Paraguay) Hugo Talavera (1975–80, 1981–85)

1980s

- (Paraguay) Gustavo Neffa (1987–89, 1998–99)
- (Spain) Raúl Amarilla (footballer, born 1960) (1988–89, 1990–93)

1990s

- (Paraguay) Roque Santa Cruz (1997–99, 2016–21)

2000s

- (Paraguay) Ricardo Tavarelli (1992–2003, 2005)
- (Uruguay) Sergio Órteman (2001–04, 2011–12, 2013)
- (Brazil) Glacinei Martins (2006)
- (Brazil) Josías Paulo Cardoso Júnior (2006)
- (Paraguay) Carlos Gamarra (2007)
- (Paraguay) Juan Rodrigo Rojas (2007–10)
- (Argentina) Juan Manuel Lucero (2008–09)
- (Paraguay) Juan Cardozo (2009)
- (Venezuela) Oswaldo Vizcarrondo (2009)
- (Ecuador) Ebelio Ordóñez (2009)
- (Argentina) José María Buljubasich (2009)
- (Uruguay) Martín Ligüera (2009–10)
- (Paraguay) Nelson Cuevas (2009–10)

2010s

- (Paraguay) Cristian Bogado (2010)
- (Argentina) Juan Carlos Ferreyra (2010, 2013)
- (Paraguay) Pablo Zeballos (2011–12, 2015)
- (Uruguay) Martín Silva (2011–13)
- (Uruguay) Juan Manuel Salgueiro (2012-2015)
- (Peru) Renzo Revoredo (2012)
- (Uruguay) Alejandro Silva (2012-2015)
- (Paraguay) Cristian Riveros (2015–2018)
- (Paraguay) Jorge Salinas (2015)
- (Paraguay) Richard Sánchez (2017-2019)

Non-CONMEBOL players

- (Panama) Alberto Zapata (2004)
- (Japan) Yoshinobu Matsumura (2008)| height = 1.80 m
- (Guatemala) Carlos Ruiz (2009)
- (Guatemala) Carlos Figueroa (2009)
- (Togo) Emmanuel Adebayor (2020)

== Managers ==
- (Paraguay) Manuel Fleitas Solich (1942)
- (Argentina) Carlos Peucelle (19??–??)
- (Paraguay) Aurelio González (195?–6?)
- (Uruguay) José María Rodríguez (1971–73)
- (Uruguay) Roque Máspoli (197?–7?)
- (Uruguay) Luis Cubilla (1979–80), (1982)
- (Uruguay) Sergio Markarián (1983–84)
- (Uruguay) Aníbal Ruiz (1985)
- (Uruguay) Sergio Markarián (1986)
- (Uruguay) Aníbal Ruiz (1987)
- (Uruguay) Luis Cubilla (January 1, 1988 – June 30, 1991)
- (Uruguay) Aníbal Ruiz (August 1991)
- (Argentina) Roberto Perfumo (1992)
- (Argentina) Osvaldo Piazza (1992)
- (Uruguay) Ever Hugo Almeida (January 1, 1993 – January 1, 1994)
- (Paraguay) Gustavo Benítez (1994)
- (Uruguay) Luis Cubilla (January 1, 1995 – December 31, 1999)
- (Paraguay) Alicio Solalinde (2000)
- (Uruguay) Aníbal Ruiz (2001), (2002)
- (Argentina) Nery Pumpido (July 1, 2001 – June 30, 2003)
- (Paraguay) Alicio Solalinde (2003)
- (Paraguay) Gustavo Benítez (2004–05)
- (Paraguay) Carlos Kiese (January 1, 2004 – December 31, 2005)
- (Paraguay) Carlos Diarte (2006)
- (Paraguay) José Cardozo (November 1, 2006 – June 30, 2007)
- (Paraguay) Félix Torres (2007)
- (Argentina) Gustavo Costas (January 1, 2008 – December 31, 2008)
- (Uruguay) Ever Almeida (August 29, 2008 – March 10, 2009)
- (Paraguay) Carlos Kiese (January 1, 2009 – December 31, 2009)
- (Uruguay) Gregorio Pérez (March 9, 2009 – July 16, 2009)
- (Paraguay) José Cardozo (November 21, 2009 – August 9, 2010)
- (Uruguay) Luis Cubilla (August 16, 2010 – December 17, 2010)
- (Argentina) Nery Pumpido (January 1, 2011 – May 11, 2011)
- (Uruguay) Gerardo Pelusso (July 1, 2011 – July 11, 2012)
- (Uruguay) Gregorio Pérez (July 11, 2012 – September 25, 2012)
- (Paraguay) José Cardozo (September 25, 2012 – December 20, 2012)
- (Uruguay) Ever Almeida (January 27, 2013 – March 10, 2014)
- (Uruguay) Diego Alonso (March 10, 2014–1?)
- (Paraguay) Luis Alberto Monzón (2014)
- (Argentina) Nery Pumpido (2014–2015)
- (Paraguay) Francisco Arce (2015–2016)
- (Spain) Fernando Jubero (2016–2017)
- (Uruguay) Pablo Repetto (2017)
- (Argentina) Daniel Garnero (2018–2020)
- (Argentina) Néstor Gorosito (2020–2021)
- (Uruguay) Sergio Orteman (2021)
- (Paraguay) Enrique Landaida (2021)
- (Uruguay) Álvaro Gutiérrez (2021)
- (Paraguay) Julio César Cáceres (2021–present)

== Other sports ==
Olimpia is also well known for training athletes that compete in other sports such as boxing, swimming, tennis and handball. Olimpia also has a successful futsal team, currently playing in the Paraguayan futsal first division.

=== Basketball ===
Just like in football, Olimpia is the most successful basketball team in Paraguay. Since 1937 it has won 29 national championships, with the twelve consecutive titles from 1946 to 1957.

==== Achievements ====
National

- Paraguayan Basketball Champion

Champion: (29) 1937, 1942, 1943, 1944, 1946, 1947, 1948, 1949, 1950, 1951, 1952, 1953, 1954, 1955, 1956, 1957, 1959, 1960, 1966, 1970, 1971, 1973, 1976, 1978, 1980, 1981, 1988, 1992, 1994

International

- South American Club Championship

Champion: 1947

=== Athletics ===
Olimpia has an athletics department directed by Ronaldo Almiron and participates in the competitions of the Federación Paraguaya de Atletismo. Recognized athlete is javelin thrower Fabian Jara represented the club in 2012, who later on registered with Club Sol de América, Jara represented Paraguay at the 2012 South American Under-23 Championships, 2014 South American Games and the 2014 South American Under-23 Championships.

=== Rugby ===
On April 29, 2019, club president Marco Trovato posted on Twitter that Olimpia would launch a rugby union section to compete in the new Superliga Americana de Rugby for its inaugural season in 2020. Named Olimpia Lions, the team will be the only Paraguayan representative at the competition. In 2022, the affiliation between the two sides was ended and the rugby club was renamed to Yakare XV.

=== Futsal ===
The club's futsal division plays in the Liga Premium, the first division of the Paraguayan futsal league system.

== See also ==
- List of world champion football clubs
