= 1994 Paraguayan Primera División season =

- Season: 1994
- Champions: Cerro Porteño
- Promoted: Deportivo Humaitá; Sportivo Trinidense; 6 teams from the interior
- Relegated: River Plate; Sportivo Trinidense; Guaraní (Coronel Oviedo); Other interior teams
- Matches: 382
- Goals: 1,012 (2.65 per match)
- Average goals/game: 2.65

The 1994 Paraguayan Primera División Championship was the 84th season of the Primera División de Paraguay, the top-flight football league in Paraguay, organized by the Paraguayan Football League (LPF).

In the end, Cerro Porteño won their 23rd national title by defeating Olimpia in the final match.

== Competition system ==
The tournament was played in two stages using a single round-robin format, meaning each team played 19 matches. The winners of each stage faced each other in a final to determine the overall champion.

Due to a reform in the championship structure, six teams from outside the capital were included in the tournament. The six promoted clubs were:

- Deportivo Boquerón
- 12 de Octubre Football Club
- Club Cerro Porteño (Presidente Franco)
- Club 8 de Diciembre
- Club Pettirossi
- Club Guaraní (Coronel Oviedo)

== Annual club changes ==
| Promoted to Primera División Deportivo Humaitá (Champion of the 1993 Primera de Ascenso) Sportivo Trinidense (Runner-up of the 1993 Primera de Ascenso) | Relegated to Primera de Ascenso None |

== Participating teams ==
| Team | City | Stadium | Capacity |
|---|---|---|---|
| 8 de Diciembre | Caaguazú | ? | ? |
| 12 de Octubre | Itauguá | ? | ? |
| Cerro Corá | Asunción | General Andrés Rodríguez | 6,000 |
| Cerro Porteño | Asunción | General Pablo Rojas | 45,000 |
| Cerro Porteño PF | Presidente Franco | ? | ? |
| Colegiales | Asunción | Luciano Zacarías | 15,000 |
| Deportivo Boquerón | Ciudad del Este | ? | ? |
| Humaitá FBC | Mariano Roque Alonso | Pioneros de Corumba Cué | 7,000 |
| Guaraní | Asunción | Rogelio Livieres | 6,000 |
| Guaraní (Coronel Oviedo) | Coronel Oviedo | ? | ? |
| Libertad | Asunción | Dr. Nicolás Leoz | 10,000 |
| Nacional | Asunción | Arsenio Erico | 4,000 |
| Olimpia | Asunción | Manuel Ferreira | 15,000 |
| Pettirossi | Encarnación | ? | ? |
| Presidente Hayes | Asunción | Kiko Reyes | 5,000 |
| River Plate | Asunción | Jardines del Kelito | 5,000 |
| Sol de América | Villa Elisa | Luis Alfonso Giagni | 5,000 |
| Sport Colombia | Fernando de la Mora | Alfonso Colmán | 7,000 |
| Sportivo Luqueño | Luque | Feliciano Cáceres | 25,000 |
| Sportivo Trinidense | Asunción | Martín Ledesma | 3,000 |

== First stage ==
=== Standings ===
| Pos. | Team | Pld | W | D | L | GF | GA | GD | Pts |
|---|---|---|---|---|---|---|---|---|---|
| 1. | Cerro Porteño | 19 | 13 | 5 | 1 | 40 | 16 | 24 | 31 |
| 2. | Olimpia | 19 | 10 | 7 | 2 | 33 | 12 | 21 | 27 |
| 3. | Sport Colombia | 19 | 11 | 4 | 4 | 27 | 17 | 10 | 26 |
| 4. | Colegiales | 19 | 9 | 8 | 2 | 39 | 17 | 22 | 26 |
| 5. | Sportivo Luqueño | 19 | 11 | 3 | 5 | 35 | 19 | 16 | 25 |
| 6. | Guaraní | 19 | 10 | 4 | 5 | 36 | 24 | 12 | 24 |
| 7. | Cerro Corá | 19 | 9 | 6 | 4 | 23 | 13 | 10 | 24 |
| 8. | Nacional | 19 | 6 | 9 | 4 | 23 | 19 | 4 | 21 |
| 9. | Presidente Hayes | 19 | 7 | 6 | 6 | 24 | 20 | 4 | 20 |
| 10. | 12 de Octubre | 19 | 5 | 10 | 4 | 22 | 18 | 4 | 20 |
| 11. | Deportivo Boquerón | 19 | 8 | 4 | 7 | 22 | 22 | 0 | 20 |
| 12. | Humaitá FBC | 19 | 6 | 7 | 6 | 26 | 26 | 0 | 19 |
| 13. | Libertad | 19 | 4 | 7 | 8 | 23 | 29 | −6 | 15 |
| 14. | River Plate | 19 | 4 | 7 | 8 | 23 | 31 | −8 | 15 |
| 15. | Sol de América | 19 | 5 | 5 | 9 | 21 | 32 | −11 | 15 |
| 16. | Cerro Porteño (PF) | 19 | 4 | 6 | 9 | 25 | 33 | −8 | 14 |
| 17. | Sportivo Trinidense | 19 | 2 | 8 | 9 | 14 | 24 | −10 | 12 |
| 18. | Guaraní (Coronel Oviedo) | 19 | 1 | 8 | 10 | 15 | 33 | −18 | 10 |
| 19. | Pettirossi | 19 | 1 | 7 | 11 | 13 | 40 | −27 | 9 |
| 20. | 8 de Diciembre | 19 | 0 | 7 | 12 | 9 | 48 | −39 | 7 |

Pos = Position; Pld = Matches played; W = Wins; D = Draws; L = Losses; GF = Goals for; GA = Goals against; GD = Goal difference; Pts = Points

== Second stage ==
=== Standings ===
| Pos. | Team | Pld | W | D | L | GF | GA | GD | Pts |
|---|---|---|---|---|---|---|---|---|---|
| 1. | Olimpia | 19 | 16 | 2 | 1 | 47 | 13 | 34 | 34 |
| 2. | Cerro Porteño | 19 | 11 | 6 | 2 | 45 | 19 | 26 | 28 |
| 3. | Humaitá FBC | 19 | 10 | 4 | 5 | 35 | 26 | 9 | 24 |
| 4. | Sport Colombia | 19 | 7 | 9 | 3 | 25 | 19 | 6 | 23 |
| 5. | Nacional | 19 | 8 | 7 | 4 | 24 | 23 | 1 | 23 |
| 6. | Presidente Hayes | 19 | 8 | 6 | 5 | 32 | 23 | 9 | 22 |
| 7. | Guaraní | 19 | 8 | 6 | 5 | 30 | 22 | 8 | 22 |
| 8. | Sol de América | 19 | 7 | 7 | 5 | 21 | 18 | 3 | 21 |
| 9. | Sportivo Luqueño | 19 | 6 | 9 | 4 | 29 | 29 | 0 | 21 |
| 10. | Libertad | 19 | 7 | 7 | 5 | 20 | 22 | −2 | 21 |
| 11. | Cerro Porteño (PF) | 19 | 7 | 4 | 8 | 24 | 43 | −19 | 18 |
| 12. | Colegiales | 19 | 5 | 6 | 8 | 21 | 19 | 2 | 16 |
| 13. | Deportivo Boquerón | 19 | 2 | 12 | 5 | 21 | 21 | 0 | 16 |
| 14. | Cerro Corá | 19 | 3 | 10 | 6 | 21 | 22 | −1 | 16 |
| 15. | River Plate | 19 | 6 | 4 | 9 | 23 | 32 | −9 | 16 |
| 16. | 8 de Diciembre | 19 | 3 | 9 | 7 | 29 | 31 | −2 | 15 |
| 17. | 12 de Octubre | 19 | 3 | 8 | 8 | 15 | 27 | −12 | 14 |
| 18. | Sportivo Trinidense | 19 | 4 | 5 | 10 | 16 | 28 | −12 | 13 |
| 19. | Pettirossi | 19 | 2 | 5 | 12 | 18 | 32 | −14 | 9 |
| 20. | Guaraní (Coronel Oviedo) | 19 | 2 | 4 | 13 | 21 | 48 | −27 | 8 |

Pos = Position; Pld = Matches played; W = Wins; D = Draws; L = Losses; GF = Goals for; GA = Goals against; GD = Goal difference; Pts = Points

== Final match ==
| Cerro Porteño | 1–1 | Olimpia |

| Olimpia | 0–0 (3–4 pen.) | Cerro Porteño |

Champion
Cerro Porteño
23rd title

== Qualification for international cups ==
- Two teams qualified for the 1995 Copa Libertadores: the champions (Cerro Porteño) and the runners-up (Olimpia).

== Relegation ==
=== Aggregate points ===
The aggregate points of a team are the sum of those earned in the first and second stages of the 1994 Championship. This determined, at the end of the tournament, the relegation to the Second Division of the team that finished last in the table.

| Pos. | Teams | Pld | W | D | L | GF | GA | GD | Pts |
|---|---|---|---|---|---|---|---|---|---|
| 1. | Olimpia | 38 | 26 | 9 | 3 | 80 | 25 | 55 | 61 |
| 2. | Cerro Porteño | 38 | 24 | 11 | 3 | 85 | 35 | 50 | 59 |
| 3. | Sport Colombia | 38 | 18 | 13 | 7 | 52 | 36 | 16 | 49 |
| 4. | Guaraní | 38 | 18 | 10 | 10 | 66 | 46 | 20 | 46 |
| 5. | Sportivo Luqueño | 38 | 17 | 12 | 9 | 64 | 48 | 16 | 46 |
| 6. | Nacional | 38 | 14 | 16 | 8 | 47 | 42 | 5 | 44 |
| 7. | Deportivo Humaitá | 38 | 16 | 11 | 11 | 61 | 52 | 9 | 43 |
| 8. | Colegiales | 38 | 14 | 14 | 10 | 60 | 36 | 24 | 42 |
| 9. | Presidente Hayes | 38 | 15 | 12 | 11 | 56 | 43 | 13 | 42 |
| 10. | Cerro Corá | 38 | 12 | 16 | 10 | 44 | 35 | 9 | 40 |
| 11. | Deportivo Boquerón | 38 | 10 | 16 | 12 | 43 | 43 | 0 | 36 |
| 12. | Libertad | 38 | 11 | 14 | 13 | 43 | 51 | -8 | 36 |
| 13. | Sol de América | 38 | 12 | 12 | 14 | 42 | 50 | -8 | 36 |
| 14. | 12 de Octubre | 38 | 8 | 18 | 12 | 37 | 45 | -8 | 34 |
| 15. | Cerro Porteño (PF) | 38 | 11 | 10 | 17 | 49 | 76 | -27 | 32 |
| 16. | River Plate | 38 | 10 | 11 | 17 | 46 | 63 | -17 | 31 |
| 17. | Sportivo Trinidense | 38 | 6 | 13 | 19 | 30 | 52 | -22 | 25 |
| 18. | 8 de Diciembre | 38 | 3 | 16 | 19 | 38 | 79 | -41 | 22 |
| 19. | Pettirossi (Note: Pettirossi and Guaraní from Coronel Oviedo finished the tournament tied in last place, so they played a playoff match to determine which team would be relegated. Pettirossi won 3–1, resulting in the relegation of Guaraní from Coronel Oviedo to their regional league.) | 38 | 3 | 12 | 23 | 31 | 72 | -41 | 18 |
| 20. | Guaraní (Coronel Oviedo) | 38 | 3 | 12 | 23 | 36 | 81 | -45 | 18 |

Pos=Position; Pld=Played; W=Won; D=Drawn; L=Lost; GF=Goals for; GA=Goals against; GD=Goal difference; Pts=Points

| Relegated to regional league. |

=== Additional relegations ===
Due to a structural reorganization of the tournament, teams that did not belong to the metropolitan area of Asunción were excluded from the following championship, and thus the five remaining clubs from the countryside were returned to their respective regional leagues.

In addition, River Plate and Sportivo Trinidense were relegated to the Second Division as they were the two lowest-ranked teams from the metropolitan area based on accumulated points.
