= 1992 Paraguayan Primera División season =

1992 Paraguayan Football Championship
- Season: 1992
- Champions: Cerro Porteño
- Promoted: Presidente Hayes
- Relegated: Sportivo San Lorenzo
- Matches played: 150 + 2 extra

The 1992 Paraguayan Football Championship of the Primera División in Paraguay was the 82nd edition of the Primera División organized by the Liga Paraguaya de Fútbol (LPF).

Cerro Porteño won their 22nd championship title in history by defeating Libertad in the final.

== Competition system ==
The tournament was divided into three phases: the first two phases featured all 12 teams playing in a single round-robin format, meaning each team played 11 matches per phase. The top four teams from each phase qualified for the final phase. If a team placed among the top four in both phases, then the team with the highest accumulated points across the two phases, excluding the already qualified teams, would also qualify for the final phase.

Depending on their final position in each of the first two phases, teams received bonus points: 1 point for first place, 0.75 points for second place, 0.5 points for third place, and 0.25 points for fourth place. These bonus points were added to the team's total for the final phase. However, if a team qualified based on the highest accumulated points across the two phases (i.e., if it was among the top four in each phase), it would not receive any bonus points.

The final phase consisted of two stages: the first was a group stage with 4 teams, each playing in a single round-robin format. The top two teams from each group advanced to the second stage, which included semifinals and a final, each played over two legs. The team that scored the most goals across both legs won the tie. If both teams scored the same number of goals, a decisive playoff match would be played. The winner of the final was crowned the 1992 Champion.

== Annual club movement ==
Promoted to the Primera División Presidente Hayes (Champion of the 1991 Primera de Ascenso)	Relegated to the Primera de Ascenso Sport Colombia (Team with the lowest accumulated points)

== Participating teams ==
Team	City	Stadium	Capacity
Cerro Corá	Asunción	General Andrés Rodríguez	6,000
Cerro Porteño	Asunción	General Pablo Rojas	32,910
Colegiales	Asunción	Luciano Zacarías	15,000
Guaraní	Asunción	Rogelio Livieres	6,000
Libertad	Asunción	Dr. Nicolás Leoz	10,000
Nacional	Asunción	Arsenio Erico	4,000
Olimpia	Asunción	Manuel Ferreira	15,000
Presidente Hayes	Asunción	Kiko Reyes	5,000
River Plate	Asunción	Jardines del Kelito	5,000
San Lorenzo	San Lorenzo	Ciudad Universitaria	3,000
Sol de América	Asunción and Villa Elisa	Luis Alfonso Giagni	5,000
Sportivo Luqueño	Luque	Feliciano Cáceres	25,000

== First phase ==
=== Standings ===
Pos.	Teams	MP	W	D	L	GF	GA	GD	Pts
1.	Olimpia	11	6	5	0	19	6	13	17
2.	Sportivo Luqueño	11	7	3	1	15	8	7	17
3.	Colegiales	11	4	5	2	17	10	7	13
4.	Nacional	11	4	4	3	12	11	1	12
5.	Guaraní	11	3	5	3	16	17	-1	11
6.	Sol de América	11	3	4	4	14	13	1	10
7.	Cerro Corá	11	4	2	5	10	12	-2	10
8.	River Plate	11	3	4	4	12	15	-3	10
9.	Presidente Hayes	11	3	4	4	10	14	-4	10
10.	Libertad	11	3	3	5	14	16	-2	9
11.	Cerro Porteño	11	1	6	4	10	13	-3	8
12.	San Lorenzo	11	1	3	7	6	20	-14	5

Pos=Position; MP=Matches played; W=Wins; D=Draws; L=Losses; GF=Goals for; GA=Goals against; GD=Goal difference; Pts=Points

Olimpia and Sportivo Luqueño tied for first place at the end of the first phase, so a playoff match was held to determine the first place (and the bonus points). Olimpia won 3:1.

Qualified for the Final Phase with bonus points

== Second phase ==
=== Standings ===
Pos.	Teams	MP	W	D	L	GF	GA	GD	Pts.
1.	Cerro Porteño	11	8	1	2	19	9	10	17
2.	Olimpia	11	7	2	2	18	8	10	16
3.	Libertad	11	5	5	1	18	12	6	15
4.	Guaraní	11	5	4	2	15	10	5	14
5.	Colegiales	11	5	3	3	16	15	1	13
6.	Presidente Hayes	11	4	3	4	12	11	1	11
7.	River Plate	11	3	4	4	9	15	-6	10
8.	Cerro Corá	11	3	4	4	11	10	1	10
9.	Sol de América	11	3	2	6	12	14	-2	8
10.	Nacional	11	2	3	6	9	16	-7	7
11.	San Lorenzo	11	3	1	7	13	17	-4	7
12.	Sportivo Luqueño	11	1	2	8	7	20	-13	4

Pos=Position; MP=Matches played; W=Wins; D=Draws; L=Losses; GF=Goals for; GA=Goals against; GD=Goal difference; Pts=Points

Qualified for the Final Stage with bonus points

== Final Stage ==
The top 4 teams from the first and second phases qualified for the Final Stage, which would decide the championship. Since Olimpia finished in the top 4 positions in both phases, the eighth spot was taken by the highest-ranked team in the accumulated points table, outside of the already qualified teams, Presidente Hayes.

The contenders were awarded bonus points based on their position in the previous phases, with the bonus points from each phase being added up. The first, second, third, and fourth teams received 1, 0.75, 0.5, and 0.25 additional points respectively. Presidente Hayes did not receive any bonus points because they did not finish in the top 4 in any phase.

In the first stage, the 8 teams were divided into two groups, where they played a round-robin tournament. The top two teams from each group advanced to the semifinals, where a team would win their tie by scoring more goals. If there was a tie in this regard, an additional tiebreaker match would be played to determine the winner.

== Group stage ==
=== Group A ===
Pos.	Teams	MP	W	D	L	GS	GC	GD	Bon.	Pts.
1.	Libertad	3	3	0	0	9	2	7	0+0.5	6.5
2.	Olimpia	3	1	1	1	5	4	1	1+0.75	4.75
3.	Nacional	3	1	0	2	3	6	-3	0+0.25	2.25
4.	Guaraní	3	0	1	2	2	6	-4	0+0.25	1.25

Pos=Position; MP=Matches played; W=Matches won; D=Matches drawn; L=Matches lost; GS=Goals scored; GC=Goals conceded; GD=Goal difference; Bon=Bonus points; Pts=Points

=== Group B ===
Pos.	Teams	MP	W	D	L	GS	GC	GD	Bon.	Pts.
1.	Cerro Porteño	3	1	2	0	4	2	2	0+1	5
2.	Sportivo Luqueño	3	0	3	0	2	2	0	0.75+0	3.75
3.	Presidente Hayes	3	1	1	1	3	4	-1	0+0	3
4.	Colegiales	3	0	2	1	2	3	-1	0.5+0	2.5

Pos=Position; MP=Matches played; W=Matches won; D=Matches drawn; L=Matches lost; GS=Goals scored; GC=Goals conceded; GD=Goal difference; Bon=Bonus points; Pts=Points

=== Final stage ===
Semifinals
Olimpia	0	0	0
Cerro Porteño	0	1	1
Libertad	1	3	4
Sportivo Luqueño	0	3	3

Finals
Cerro Porteño	2	0	2
Libertad	2	0	2

Cerro Porteño	5–0	Libertad

Cerro Porteño
22nd title

== Qualification for International Cups ==
- For the 1993 Copa Libertadores, two teams qualified: the champion of the 1992 Championship (Cerro Porteño) and the winner of a playoff between the Championship runner-up (Libertad) and the 1992 Torneo República champion (Olimpia):
1992

Libertad	1–1	Olimpia

1992

Olimpia	1–1 (3–2 p)	Libertad

After a 2–2 aggregate draw and a 3–2 win in the penalty shootout, Olimpia qualified for the 1993 Copa Libertadores.

== Relegation ==
The cumulative points of a team were the sum of those obtained in the first and second phases of the 1992 Championship. This total determined, at the end of the tournament, the relegation to the Primera de Ascenso for the team that finished in last place on the table.

=== Cumulative table ===
Pos.	Teams	MP	W	D	L	GF	GA	GD	Pts.
1.	Olimpia	22	13	7	2	37	14	23	33
2.	Colegiales	22	9	8	5	33	25	8	26
3.	Cerro Porteño	22	9	7	6	29	22	7	25
4.	Guaraní	22	8	9	5	31	27	4	25
5.	Libertad	22	8	8	6	32	28	4	24
6.	Presidente Hayes	22	7	7	8	22	25	-3	21
7.	Sportivo Luqueño	22	8	5	9	22	28	-6	21
8.	Cerro Corá	22	7	6	9	21	22	-1	20
9.	River Plate	22	6	8	8	21	30	-9	20
10.	Nacional	22	6	7	9	21	27	-6	19
11.	Sol de América	22	6	6	10	26	27	-1	18
12.	San Lorenzo	22	4	4	14	19	37	-18	12

Pos=Position; MP=Matches played; W=Matches won; D=Matches drawn; L=Matches lost; GF=Goals for; GA=Goals against; GD=Goal difference; Pts=Points

Relegated to the Primera de Ascenso.
