= Virgilio Ferreira =

Paraguayan footballer (born 1973)

Personal information
- Full name: Virgilio Ferreira Romero
- Date of birth: 28 January 1973 (age 53)
- Place of birth: Atyrá, Paraguay
- Height: 1.79 m (5 ft 10 in)
- Positions: Forward; attacking midfielder

Senior career*
| Years | Team | Apps | (Gls) |
| 1989–1996 | Cerro Porteño | 118 | (73) |
| 1996–1999 | Betis | 0 | (0) |
| 1996–1998 | → Extremadura (loan) | 42 | (3) |
| 1998–1999 | → Recreativo de Huelva (loan) | 29 | (4) |
| 1999–2000 | América | 0 | (0) |
| 2001–2002 | Cerro Porteño | 56 | (26) |
| 2002–2003 | Libertad | 27 | (4) |
| 2003 | LDU Quito | 20 | (11) |
| 2004 | The Strongest | 4 | (2) |
| 2004–2006 | 12 de Octubre | 21 | (2) |
| 2008 | Técnico Universitario | 8 | (1) |
| Total | | 325 | (126) |

International career
| 1993–2002 | Paraguay | 25 | (7) |
- * Club domestic league appearances and goals

Virgilio Ferreira Romero (born 28 January 1973) is a Paraguayan former professional footballer who played as a midfielder.

He was Paraguayan international and represented the nation in two Copa América tournaments.

== Honours ==
Cerro Porteño

- Paraguayan Primera División: 1990, 1992, 1994
- Torneo República: 1991

LDU Quito

- Serie A: 2003

Paraguay

- Copa América: 1993, 2001
