= Edgar Aguilera =

Paraguayan footballer (born 1975)

Personal information
- Full name: Edgar Milcíades Aguilera Aranda
- Date of birth: 28 July 1975 (age 51)
- Place of birth: Villeta, Paraguay
- Height: 1.75 m (5 ft 9 in)
- Positions: Midfielder; defender

Senior career*
Years	Team	Apps	(Gls)
1993–1998	Cerro Corá		
1998	Atlético Paranaense	5	(0)
1999	Cerro Porteño		
1999–2003	Guaraní	5	(0)
2000–2002	→ Cerro Corá (loan)	34	(1)
2002	→ CSD Municipal (loan)		
2003–2005	Nacional Asunción		
2005	Blooming		
2006	General Caballero		

International career
1998–1999	Paraguay	8	(0)
- * Club domestic league appearances and goals

Edgar Milcíades Aguilera Aranda (born 28 July 1975) is a retired Paraguayan footballer. He played either as a defender or midfielder.

Aguilera represented Paraguay at the 1998 FIFA World Cup. At the club level, he played mostly for Cerro Corá and played abroad for Cerro Porteño, Atlético Paranaense in Brazil, CSD Municipal in Guatemala and Blooming in Bolivia.
