= Javier González (footballer, born 1979) =

Paraguayan footballer

Personal information
- Full name: Javier Mercedes González
- Date of birth: 24 September 1979 (age 47)
- Place of birth: Asunción, Paraguay
- Height: 1.75 m (5 ft 9 in)
- Position: Forward

Team information
- Current team: Nacional

Senior career*
Years	Team	Apps	(Gls)
2000–2001	Cerro Corá	10	(4)
2002	Sport Colombia	16	(5)
2003–2004	Cerro Corá	22	(13)
2005–2006	Sportivo Luqueño	62	(25)
2007	Barcelona S.C.	13	(3)
2007–2008	Guaraní	51	(18)
2009–2010	Libertad	21	(9)
2011–	Nacional	4	(0)

International career
2001–2006	Paraguay	2	(0)
- * Club domestic league appearances and goals as of 1 January 2010

Javier Mercedes González (born 24 September 1979 in Asunción) is a Paraguayan footballer currently playing in Paraguay for Club Nacional.

== Career ==
=== Club career ===
González began his career in 2000 with Club Cerro Corá. He has also played for Club Sport Colombia, Sportivo Luqueño, Club Guaraní and his current club Libertad in Paraguay.

In 2007 González played in Ecuador with Barcelona S.C.

=== International career ===
González has made 2 appearances for the Paraguay national team in 2001 and 2006.
