= 2009 Torneo di Viareggio =

2009 Viareggio Cup World Football Tournament Coppa Carnevale
61° Torneo di Viareggio

Tournament details
- Host country: Italy
- City: Viareggio
- Dates: February 9, 2009 - February 23, 2009
- Teams: 40

Final positions
- Champions: (Italy) Juventus
- Runners-up: (Italy) Sampdoria

Tournament statistics
- Matches played: 75
- Goals scored: 213 (2.84 per match)
- Top scorer: (Somalia) Ayub Daud (8)
- Best player: (Italy) Guido Marilungo

The 2009 winners of the Torneo di Viareggio (in English, the Viareggio Tournament, officially the Viareggio Cup World Football Tournament Coppa Carnevale), the annual youth football tournament held in Viareggio, Tuscany, are listed below.

== Format ==
The 40 teams are seeded in 10 pools, split up into 5-pool groups. Each team from a pool meets the others in a single tie. The winning club from each pool and three best runners-up from both group A and group B progress to the final knockout stage. All matches in the final rounds are single tie. The Round of 16 envisions penalties and no extra time, while the rest of the final round matches include 30 minutes extra time and penalties to be played if the draw between teams still holds.

== Participating teams ==
Italian teams

- (Italy) Atalanta
- (Italy) Bari
- (Italy) Bologna
- (Italy) Cesena
- (Italy) Cisco Roma
- (Italy) Empoli
- (Italy) Fiorentina
- (Italy) Frosinone
- (Italy) Genoa
- (Italy) Inter Milan
- (Italy) Juventus
- (Italy) Lazio
- (Italy) Milan
- (Italy) Novara
- (Italy) Palermo
- (Italy) Parma
- (Italy) Pisa
- (Italy) Serie D Representatives
- (Italy) Reggina
- (Italy) Rimini
- (Italy) Roma
- (Italy) Sampdoria
- (Italy) Siena
- (Italy) Torino
- (Italy) Vicenza

European teams

- (Denmark) Aarhus
- (Belgium) Anderlecht
- (North Macedonia) Belasica
- (Czech Republic) Dukla Prague
- (Denmark) Midtjylland
- (England) QPR
- (Russia) Spartak Moscow

Asian teams

- (Israel) Maccabi Haifa
- (Uzbekistan) Paxtakor

African Team

- (Burkina Faso) RC Bobo

American teams

- (United States) L.I.A.C. of New York
- (Paraguay) Nacional Asunción
- (Colombia) Independiente Santa Fé
- (Mexico) Pumas

Oceanian teams

- (Australia) APIA Tigers

== Group stage ==
=== Group A ===
==== Pool 1 ====
Team	Pts	Pld	W	D	L	GF	GA	GD
(Italy) Inter Milan	9	3	3	0	0	7	2	+5
(Italy) Palermo	6	3	2	0	1	6	3	+3
(England) QPR	3	3	1	0	2	5	5	0
(Australia) APIA Tigers	0	3	0	0	3	2	10	-8

==== Pool 2 ====
Team	Pts	Pld	W	D	L	GF	GA	GD
(Italy) Juventus	7	3	2	1	0	4	1	+3
(Israel) Maccabi Haifa	6	3	2	0	1	3	3	0
(Italy) Parma	3	3	1	0	2	3	3	0
(Italy) Frosinone	1	3	0	1	2	3	6	-3

==== Pool 3 ====
Team	Pts	Pld	W	D	L	GF	GA	GD
(Italy) Torino	9	3	3	0	0	5	1	+4
(Italy) Bari	4	3	1	1	1	3	3	0
(Colombia) Independiente Santa Fé	4	3	1	1	1	3	3	0
(North Macedonia) Belasica	0	3	0	0	3	2	6	-4

==== Pool 4 ====
Team	Pts	Pld	W	D	L	GF	GA	GD
(Italy) Sampdoria	9	3	3	0	0	5	1	+4
(Italy) Bologna	4	3	1	1	1	3	4	-1
(Italy) Rimini	3	3	1	0	2	3	3	0
(Uzbekistan) Paxtakor	1	3	0	1	2	2	5	-3

==== Pool 5 ====
Team	Pts	Pld	W	D	L	GF	GA	GD
(Russia) Spartak Moscow	6	3	2	0	1	9	6	+3
(Italy) Siena	6	3	2	0	1	5	4	+1
(Italy) Empoli	4	3	1	1	1	5	5	0
(Paraguay) Nacional Asunción	1	3	0	1	2	4	8	-4

=== Group B ===
==== Pool 6 ====
Team	Pts	Pld	W	D	L	GF	GA	GD
(Italy) Vicenza	5	3	1	2	0	3	2	+1
(Italy) Milan	4	3	1	1	1	4	3	+1
(Italy) Cesena	4	3	1	1	0	3	3	0
(Mexico) Pumas	2	3	0	2	1	1	3	-2

==== Pool 7 ====
Team	Pts	Pld	W	D	L	GF	GA	GD
(Italy) Reggina	7	3	2	1	0	8	1	+7
(Italy) Cisco Roma	7	3	2	1	0	6	0	+6
(Italy) Roma	3	3	1	0	2	4	6	-2
(Denmark) Aarhus	0	3	0	0	3	1	12	-11

==== Pool 8 ====
Team	Pts	Pld	W	D	L	GF	GA	GD
(Italy) Fiorentina	7	3	2	1	0	8	2	+6
(Czech Republic) Dukla Prague	5	3	1	2	0	7	4	+3
(Italy) Pisa	4	3	1	1	1	3	3	0
(United States) L.I.A.C. of New York	0	3	0	0	3	2	11	-9

==== Pool 9 ====
Team	Pts	Pld	W	D	L	GF	GA	GD
(Denmark) Midtjylland	9	3	3	0	0	5	1	+4
(Italy) Serie D Repress.	6	3	2	0	1	5	3	+1
(Italy) Atalanta	3	3	1	0	2	1	2	-1
(Italy) Novara	0	3	0	0	3	0	5	-5

==== Pool 10 ====
Team	Pts	Pld	W	D	L	GF	GA	GD
(Italy) Genoa	7	3	2	1	0	7	3	+4
(Italy) Lazio	6	3	2	0	1	7	2	+5
(Burkina Faso) RC Bobo	3	3	1	0	2	5	7	-2
(Belgium) Anderlecht	1	3	0	1	2	3	10	-7

== Knockout stage ==
Round of 16
17 February (15:00 CET)
(Italy) Torino	3
(Italy) Cisco Roma	1
17 February (15:00 CET)
(Italy) Reggina	2
(Russia) Spartak Moscow	1
17 February (15:00 CET)
(Italy) Juventus	2 (7)
(Italy) Lazio	2 (6)
17 February (15:00 CET)
(Denmark) Midtjylland	0 (4)
(Italy) Siena	0 (5)
17 February (14:30 CET)
(Italy) Inter Milan	3
(Italy) Vicenza	1
17 February (15:00 CET)
(Italy) Fiorentina	0 (2)
(Israel) Maccabi Haifa	0 (4)
17 February (15:00 CET)
(Italy) Sampdoria	2
(Italy) Serie D Repres.	1
17 February (18:00 CET)
(Italy) Genoa	0
(Italy) Palermo	2

Quarter-finals
19 February (15:00 CET)
(Italy) Torino	2 (6)
(Italy) Reggina	2 (3)
19 February (15:00 CET)
(Italy) Juventus	3
(Italy) Siena	2
19 February (18:00 CET)
(Italy) Inter Milan	3
(Israel) Maccabi Haifa	0
19 February (14:30 CET)
(Italy) Sampdoria	3
(Italy) Palermo	1

Semi-finals
21 February (15:00 CET)
(Italy) Torino	1
(Italy) Juventus	3
21 February (15:00 CET)
(Italy) Inter Milan	1
(Italy) Sampdoria	2

Final
23 February (15:00 CET)
(Italy) Juventus	4
(Italy) Sampdoria	1

== Champions ==
Torneo di Viareggio 2009 Champions

F.C. Juventus
6th time

== Top goalscorers ==
8 goals

- (Somalia) Ayub Daud ( (Italy) Juventus)

6 goals

- (Italy) Denis D'Onofrio (Italy) Torino)
- (Italy) Pietro Iannazzo (Italy) Reggina)

4 goals

- (Italy) Nicola Ferrari ( (Italy) Sampdoria)
- (Italy) Ciro Immobile ( (Italy) Juventus)
