= Teresio Centurión =

Paraguayan footballer and coach (born 1958)

Personal information
- Full name: Teresio Faustino Centurión Sosa
- Date of birth: 3 October 1958 (age 68)
- Place of birth: Asunción, Paraguay
- Position: Midfielder

Senior career*
Years	Team	Apps	(Gls)
1976–1980	Sol de América	?	(?)
1981	Capitán Figari	?	(?)
1981–1989	Sol de América	?	(?)
1990	Cerro Corá	?	(?)
1991	12 de Junio C.O.	?	(?)
1991	Silvio Pettirossi	?	(?)
1992	Humaitá	?	(?)
- * Club domestic league appearances and goals

Teresio Faustino Centurión Sosa (born 3 October 1958) is a former football midfielder and coach.

== Career ==
Centurión started his career in Sol de América in 1976 until 1989, with a 3-month spell at club Capitán Figari in 1981. He also played for other Paraguayan clubs until 1992 where he ended his career playing for Humaitá. Centurión became a symbol for Sol de América where he spent the majority of his career, obtaining the first championship for the club in 1986 and several second-place finishes (1978, 1979, 1981, 1988).

As a coach, he managed several teams from Atyrá, Limpio and Guarambaré; as well as Silvio Pettirossi and the youth divisions of Sol de América.

== Titles ==
Season	Team	Title
1986	Sol de América	Paraguayan 1st division
1990	Cerro Corá	Paraguayan 2nd division
