= Nicola Ferrari =

Nicola Ferrari may refer to:

- Nicola Ferrari (footballer, born 1983), Italian footballer
- Nicola Ferrari (footballer, born 1989), Italian footballer
