= Rodrigo Delvalle =

Paraguayan footballer (born 2001)

Personal information
- Full name: Rodrigo Elías Delvalle Noguera
- Date of birth: 17 May 2001 (age 25)
- Place of birth: Paraguay
- Height: 1.87 m (6 ft 2 in)
- Position: Defender

Team information
- Current team: Arsenal Sarandí

Youth career
- Cerro Porteño

Senior career*
Years	Team	Apps	(Gls)
2019–2026	Cerro Porteño	13	(0)
2023	Sportivo Trinidense (loan)	4	(0)
2024–2025	Sol de América (loan)	36	(2)
2026–	Arsenal Sarandí	0	(0)
- * Club domestic league appearances and goals as of 18:23, 25 March 2026 (UTC)

Rodrigo Elías Delvalle Noguera (born 17 May 2001) is a Paraguayan professional footballer who plays as a defender for Primera B Metropolitana side Arsenal Sarandí.

== Club career ==
Delvalle began his career with Paraguayan Primera División side Cerro Porteño and made his professional debut on 15 December 2019 against General Díaz. He started the match as Cerro Porteño were defeated 2–4.

In 2023, he was loaned to Sportivo Trinidense, where he played four matches. In 2024, he joined Cerro Porteño’s preseason but was later loaned to Club Sol de América.

== Career statistics ==
=== Club ===
As of match played 21 november 2024

Appearances and goals by club, season and competition
Club	Season	League			Cup		Other		Total	
Club	Season	Division	Apps	Goals	Apps	Goals	Apps	Goals	Apps	Goals
Cerro Porteño	2019	Paraguayan Primera División	1	0	0	0	0	0	1	0
Cerro Porteño	2020	Paraguayan Primera División	3	0	0	0	0	0	3	0
Cerro Porteño	2021	Paraguayan Primera División	4	0	0	0	1	0	5	0
Cerro Porteño	2022	Paraguayan Primera División	3	1	0	0	0	0	3	1
Cerro Porteño	2023	Paraguayan Primera División	2	0	0	0	0	0	2	0
Sportivo Trinidense	2023	Paraguayan Primera División	4	0	1	0	0	0	5	0
Sol De América	2024	Paraguayan Primera División	17	1	2	0	0	0	19	1
Career total			34	2	3	0	1	0	38	2
