= Salvador Breglia =

Paraguayan footballer (1935-2014)

Personal information
- Full name: Salvador Luis Amílcar Breglia Luna
- Date of birth: 15 September 1935
- Place of birth: Caazapá, Paraguay
- Date of death: 17 January 2014 (aged 78)
- Place of death: Asunción, Paraguay
- Positions: Defender; midfielder

Youth career
- 25 de Enero
- Nanawa

Senior career*
Years	Team	Apps	(Gls)
1950–1968	Cerro Porteño	225	(21)

International career
1960–1967	Paraguay	?	(?)
- * Club domestic league appearances and goals

Salvador Luis Amílcar Breglia Luna (15 September 1935 – 17 January 2014) was a Paraguayan football defender/midfielder and coach.

== Career ==
Breglia was born in Caazapá, where he started his career in the youth divisions of Club 25 de Enero and then Club Nanawa. He then moved to Cerro Porteño and made his debut at the age of 16. He would win several national championships while at Cerro and was part of the Paraguay national football team from 1960 to 1967.

As a coach, he managed Cerro Porteño, Paranaense, Libertad, Sol de América, Limpio and Teniente Fariña of Guarambaré. Breglia was also part of the coaching staff for the Paraguay national team at the 1986 FIFA World Cup.

He died in Asunción, aged 78.

== Titles ==
=== As player ===
Season	Team	Title
1954	Cerro Porteño	Paraguayan 1st division
1961	Cerro Porteño	Paraguayan 1st division
1963	Cerro Porteño	Paraguayan 1st division
1966	Cerro Porteño	Paraguayan 1st division

=== As coach ===
Season	Team	Title
1972	Cerro Porteño	Paraguayan 1st division
1973	Cerro Porteño	Copa República
1974	Cerro Porteño	Paraguayan 1st division
1977	Cerro Porteño	Paraguayan 1st division
