= Juvencio Osorio =

Paraguayan footballer (1950–2023)

Personal information
- Full name: Juvencio Osorio Maldonado
- Date of birth: 1 June 1950
- Place of birth: Asunción, Paraguay
- Date of death: 10 March 2023 (aged 72)
- Height: 1.69 m (5 ft 7 in)
- Position: Central midfielder

Senior career*
Years	Team	Apps	(Gls)
1968-1975	Cerro Porteño	108	(21)
1975–1979	Espanyol	105	(11)
1979-1985	Cerro Porteño	90	(5)
Total		303	(37)

International career
1973-1980	Paraguay	12	(2)
- * Club domestic league appearances and goals

Juvencio Osorio Maldonado (1 June 1950 – 10 March 2023) was a Paraguayan footballer who played as a central midfielder.

== Career ==
Osorio began his football career with Cerro Porteño, where he would win three straight titles (1972–1974). Next, he moved to Spain, joining RCD Espanyol for four seasons, before returning and eventually retiring with Cerro Porteño. His nephew, Secundino Aifuch, was his teammate at Espanyol for one season in 1978–79.

== Honours ==
Cerro Porteño

- Paraguayan Primera División: 1970, 1972, 1973, 1974

Paraguay

- Copa América: 1979
