= Ricardo Bitancort =

Uruguayan footballer (1972-2002)

Personal information
- Full name: Ricardo Celestino Bitancort Juárez
- Date of birth: 21 April 1972
- Place of birth: Montevideo, Uruguay
- Date of death: 16 March 2002 (aged 29)
- Place of death: Montevideo, Uruguay
- Height: 1.75 m (5 ft 9 in)

Senior career*
Years	Team	Apps	(Gls)
- Cerro Porteño
1990–1994	Danubio		
1995	River Plate	0	(0)
1996	Nacional		
1997	Cerro Porteño		
1998	Villa Española		
1999	Rampla Juniors		
2000	Juventud de Las Piedras		

International career
1993	Uruguay	1	(0)
- * Club domestic league appearances and goals

Ricardo Bitancort (21 April 1972 – 1 March 2002) was a Uruguayan footballer.

== International career ==
Bitancort made one appearance for the senior Uruguay national football team, a friendly against Germany on 13 October 1993.

== Death ==
Bittancort was stabbed to death by a teenager in Montevideo after a fight broke out at a dance.
