= Juan Cardozo =

Paraguayan footballer (born 1974)

Personal information
- Full name: Juan Cardozo
- Date of birth: 1 August 1974 (age 52)
- Place of birth: Encarnación, Paraguay
- Height: 1.67 m (5 ft 5 1/2 in)
- Position: Defender

Senior career*
Years	Team	Apps	(Gls)
2000–2003	Universal		
2004–2005	3 de Febrero		
2005–2006	Cerro Porteño	20	(1)
2007	Sportivo Luqueño	41	(1)
2008	Nacional Asunción	30	(0)
2009	Olimpia Asunción	6	(0)
2010	Sportivo Trinidense	10	(0)
2011	Independiente CG	1	(0)

International career
2000–2005	Paraguay	2	(0)
- * Club domestic league appearances and goals

Juan Cardozo (born 1 August 1974) is a Paraguayan former footballer.
