= Secundino Aifuch =

Paraguayan footballer (born 1952)

Personal information
- Full name: Secundino Aifuch Osorio
- Date of birth: July 21, 1952 (age 74)
- Place of birth: Asunción, Paraguay
- Height: 1.75 m (5 ft 9 in)
- Position: Centre-back

Youth career
- 12 de Octubre

Senior career*
Years	Team	Apps	(Gls)
1971–1975	Sol de América		
1976–1978	Cerro Porteño		
1978–1982	Espanyol	67	(6)
1982	Cerro Porteño		
1983–1984	Sportivo San Lorenzo		
1984–1985	AC Santa Maria		
1986	Sportivo San Lorenzo		
1987	Sportivo Iteño		

International career
1971	Paraguay U20		
1975–1981	Paraguay	20	(2)
- * Club domestic league appearances and goals

Secundino Aifuch Osorio (Note: Can also be seen spelled Ayfuch and Asurio, respectively.) (born 21 July 1952) is a Paraguayan former professional footballer who played as a centre-back.

== Club career ==
He spent most of his career in the Paraguayan Primera División, playing with Sol de América and Cerro Porteño, winning a title with the latter in 1977 and playing five matches at the 1978 Copa Libertadores before moving to Spanish side Espanyol ahead of the 1978–79 La Liga season. In four seasons in Spain, he made 67 league appearances, scoring six times.

In his fourth match with the club, on 29 April 1979, he scored against Barcelona at Camp Nou, putting one past Pedro Artola albeit during a 2–1 defeat. Three weeks later, he scored Espanyol's 2,000th top-flight goal in a victory over Burgos. The transfer of young star defender Canito to Barcelona meant Aifuch became a regular starter during his second season in 1979–80. He netted his only brace with the team in a win over Las Palmas in May 1981. However, Canito's return to Espanyol in 1981–82 relegated him back to the bench. Even further, he suffered a grave injury during a match against Las Palmas on 10 November 1981, tearing his MCL in his left knee. This was Aifuch's last match in La Liga.

He returned to Cerro Porteño for a season before finishing his career with Sportivo San Lorenzo and Sportivo Iteño, with a short stint with Italian club AC Santa Maria in 1984–1985.

In 2017, he was selected by a commission of Cerro Porteño fans as one of the 35 "club idols" that received a tribute at the re-inauguration of their home ground Estadio General Pablo Rojas.

== International career ==
Aifuch was part of the national squad that won the 1971 South American U-20 Championship held in Paraguay by going undefeated. He scored in the semi-final victory over Peru.

He earned 20 caps with the senior national team from 1975 to 1981. He represented his country during 1978 and 1982 FIFA World Cup qualifiers. He also played in the 1976 Taça do Atlântico.

=== International goals ===
Scores and results list Paraguay's goal tally first.

Goal	Date	Venue	Opponent	Score	Result	Competition
1.	2 February 1977	Estadio Defensores del Chaco, Asunción, Paraguay	Chile	2–0	2–0	Friendly
2.	9 February 1977	Paraguay	Bolivia		2–2	1977 Copa Paz del Chaco

== Honours ==
=== Club ===
Cerro Porteño

- Paraguayan Primera División: 1977

== Personal life ==
His uncle, Juvencio Osorio, won three straight titles with Cerro Porteño (1972–1974) before spending four years at Espanyol and eventually retiring with Cerro Porteño. They were teammates for one season in Spain in 1978–79.
