= Sinforiano García =

Paraguayan footballer (1924–1992)

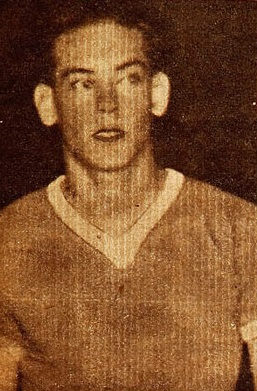
- García in 1946

Personal information
- Date of birth: 22 August 1924
- Place of birth: Puerto Pinasco, Paraguay
- Date of death: 29 May 1992 (aged 67)
- Position: Goalkeeper

Senior career*
Years	Team	Apps	(Gls)
1944	Atlético Corrales		
1945–1948	Cerro Porteño		
1949–1958	Flamengo	276	(0)

International career
1945–1949	Paraguay	20	(0)
- * Club domestic league appearances and goals

Sinforiano García (22 August 1924 – 29 May 1992) was a Paraguayan professional footballer who played as a goalkeeper for two top level Paraguayan clubs and for Brazilian club Flamengo.

== Club career ==
Born in Puerto Pinasco, Paraguay on 22 August 1924, Sinforiano García started his career in 1944, playing for Atlético Corrales, moving in 1945 to Cerro Porteño, leaving this club in 1948. He joined Brazilian club Flamengo in 1949, after scouts observed him during the 1949 South American Championship, and played his first game for the club on 29 May 1949, when his club defeated Arsenal of England 3–1 at Estádio São Januário, Rio de Janeiro. Sinforiano García played 276 games and suffered 364 goals defending the Brazilian club, and was crucial for the club's 1953, 1954 and 1955 Campeonato Carioca titles.

== International career ==
García played 20 games for the Paraguay national team between 1945 and 1949.

== Death ==
García died on 29 May 1992, at the age of 67.
