= Jacinto Villalba =

Paraguayan footballer

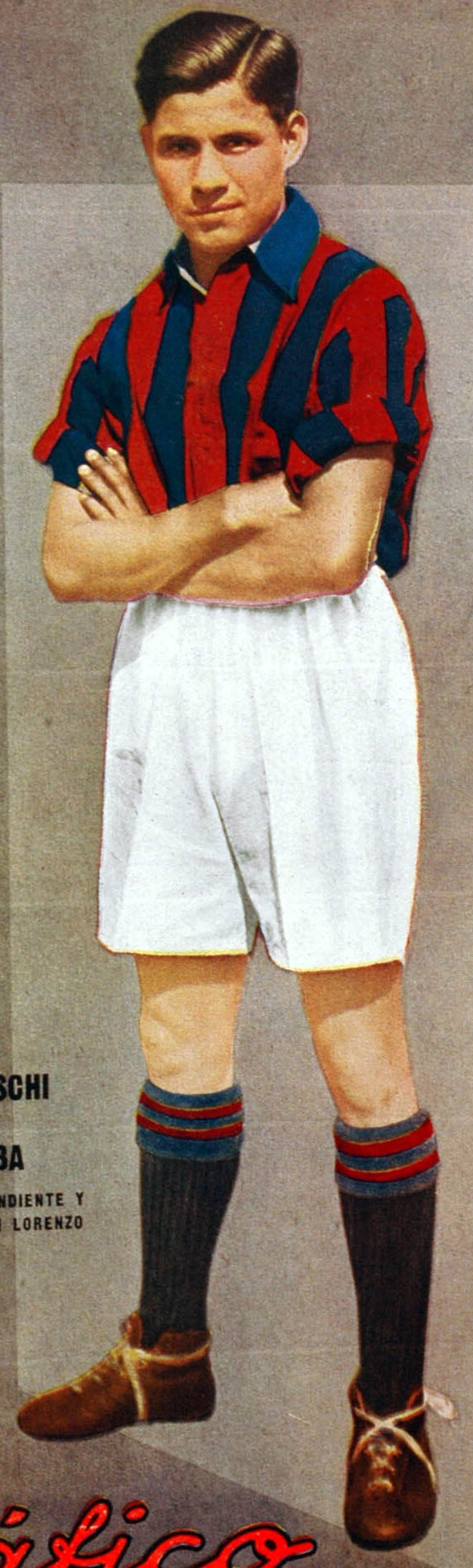
- in El Grafico, 1934

Personal information
- Date of birth: 19 September 1914
- Place of birth: Asunción, Paraguay
- Position: Forward

Senior career*
Years	Team	Apps	(Gls)
1930	Cerro Porteño		
1932-1935	San Lorenzo de Almagro	64	(18)

International career
- Paraguay
- * Club domestic league appearances and goals

Jacinto Villalba (born 19 September 1914, date of death unknown) was a Paraguayan football forward who played for Paraguay in the 1930 FIFA World Cup. He also played for Cerro Porteño. In Argentina, he was played for San Lorenzo de Almagro, in 1932 to 1935, and obtain the championship in 1933 with this club. Villalba is deceased.
