= Grégorio Esperón =

Argentine footballer and coach

Personal information
- Full name: Grégorio Juan Esperón
- Date of birth: August 15, 1912
- Place of birth: Buenos Aires, Argentina
- Date of death: September 30, 2000 (aged 88)
- Place of death: Buenos Aires, Argentina
- Position: Right back

Senior career*
Years	Team	Apps	(Gls)
1933	Tigre	5	(0)
1934–1944	Platense	244	(24)
1945	São Cristóvão	?	(0)
1946–47	Roma	7	(0)

International career
	Argentina	10	(1)

Managerial career
- 1948: Platense
- 1950: Barcelona
- 1951–1953: Emelec
- 1953: Ecuador
- 1954: Cerro Porteño
- 1956: Platense
- 1964: Excursionistas
- 1966: Juan Aurich
- * Club domestic league appearances and goals

Grégorio Juan Esperón (known in different sources as Iván Esperón or Gregorio Esperón) (August 15, 1912 – September 30, 2000) was an Argentine professional football player and coach.

He was a very good right back, probably, the best defensive player in the history of Platense. In 1938, he refused a transfer to a bigger club, because he did not want his team, Platense, to be weakened. As a player, at the end of his career, he played 7 games for A.S. Roma in the Serie A in the 1946/47 season, where he also coached the youth teams.

Between 1940 and 1942, he played 10 games for the Argentina national team, scoring one goal against Uruguay. In 1941, he was part of the national team that won the Copa América (Campeonato Sudamericano). He also coached Ecuador in 1953, coaching the team during the Copa América of that year.

After he retired as a player, he coached in Argentina, Ecuador and Paraguay. He coached Platense, his old team, from 1948 to 1950 and 1956; Barcelona SC in 1950; Emelec from 1951 to 1953; Ecuador in 1953; Deportiva Valdez in 1953; Cerro Porteño in 1954. His last coaching job was Excursionistas in 1964.
