= Ayub Daud =

Somali international footballer

Personal information
- Date of birth: 24 February 1990 (age 36)
- Place of birth: Mogadishu, Somalia
- Height: 1.72 m (5 ft 8 in)
- Position: Striker

Youth career
- 1999–2000: Cuneo
- 2000–2009: Juventus

Senior career*
Years	Team	Apps	(Gls)
2008–2013	Juventus	1	(0)
2009–2010	→ F.C. Crotone (loan)	11	(0)
2010–2011	→ Lumezzane (loan)	4	(1)
2011–2012	→ Cosenza (loan)	14	(2)
2012	→ Gubbio (loan)	11	(4)
2012–2013	Chiasso	9	(2)
2013–2016	Honvéd	52	(14)
2016–2017	Viareggio 2014	0	(0)
Total		102	(23)

International career
2011–2015	Somalia	40	(6)
- * Club domestic league appearances and goals

Ayub Daud (Somali: Ayuub Daaud, Arabic: أيوب داود; born 24 February 1990) is a Somali former professional footballer who played as a forward or attacking midfielder for the Somalia national team.

== Club career ==
The son of Daud Hussein, a former member of the Somalia national team, Daud was born in Somalia, and moved to Cuneo, Italy with his family at the age of five.

He joined the Juventus youth sector in 2000 and made his debut with the Primavera (under-20) squad in the 2007–08 season. Daud was part of the Juventus squad in the 2009 Torneo di Viareggio, where he was praised as one of the best footballers of the tournament. He scored 20 goals, and was named top scorer of the tournament.

On 14 March 2009, he made his first team debut with Juventus, replacing Sebastian Giovinco during the final minutes of a Serie A 4–1 win over Bologna.

On 6 August 2009, Daud left Juventus and joined Crotone on loan. The youngster endured a difficult time at the southern Italian club, and subsequently returned to Juventus in January of the following year. He was then loaned out to Serie C1 club Lumezzane. On 25 January 2011 he left for Gubbio on loan. Daud left Italy in August 2013 to join Hungarian club Budapest Honvéd.
