= Plaqueta Millington Drake =

- Founded: 1942
- Folded: 1953
- Country: Paraguay
- Confederation: CONMEBOL
- Most championships: Nacional (4 titles)

The Plaqueta Millington Drake is a defunct official football tournament from Paraguay. The competition was held at the beginning of the year prior to the Paraguayan Primera División championship, in single-round matches, using a points accumulation system. It was awarded by the LPF, as a donation from the English Gentleman Sir Eugen Millington-Drake.

== Finals ==
Ed.	Year	Champion
1	1942	Nacional
2	1943	Olimpia
3	1944	Nacional
4	1945	Nacional
5	1946	Nacional
6	1947	Olimpia
7	1948	Olimpia
8	1949	Cerro Porteño
9	1950	Cerro Porteño
10	1951	Olimpia
11	1952	Libertad
12	1953	Sportivo Luqueño

== Performance by club ==
Club	Winners	Winning years
Nacional	4	1942, 1944, 1945, 1946
Olimpia	4	1943, 1947, 1948, 1951
Cerro Porteño	2	1949, 1950
Libertad	1	1952
Sportivo Luqueño	1	1953
