= Inca (footballer) =

Brazilian footballer (born 1973)

Personal information
- Full name: Glacinei Martins da Silva
- Date of birth: 19 September 1973 (age 53)
- Place of birth: São Paulo, Brazil
- Height: 1.75 m (5 ft 9 in)
- Position: Midfielder

Senior career*
Years	Team	Apps	(Gls)
2001	URT		
2001	Atlético Mogi		
2003–2005	Cerro Porteño		
2005–2006	Nacional		
2006	Olimpia		
2007–2009	Nacional		
2010–2011	Sol de América		
2012–2013	Sportivo San Lorenzo		
- * Club domestic league appearances and goals

Glacinei Martins da Silva (born 19 September 1973), professionally known as Inca, is a Brazilian former professional footballer who played as a midfielder.

== Career ==
In 2010, Inca was suspended for a month for doping.

In June 2012 he re-signed for Sportivo San Lorenzo.

== Honours ==
Cerro Porteño

- Paraguayan Primera División 2003, 2004, 2005

Nacional

- Paraguayan Primera División: 2008
