= Hugo González (Paraguayan footballer) =

Paraguayan footballer

Personal information
- Full name: Hugo Arsenio González
- Date of birth: 14 December 1948 (age 77)
- Place of birth: Acahay, Paraguay
- Height: 1.80 m (5 ft 11 in)
- Position: Striker

Senior career*
Years	Team	Apps	(Gls)
1969–1971	Cerro Porteño		
1971–1975	Red Star	94	(31)
1977–1979	Cerro Porteño		

International career
	Paraguay	11	

Managerial career
- 1980: Cerro Porteño
- 1981: Cerro Porteño
- 1982: Cerro Porteño
- 1984: Cerro Porteño
- 2004: Sportivo Luqueño
- 2005: Sportivo Luqueño
- * Club domestic league appearances and goals

Hugo Arsenio González (born 14 December 1948) is a Paraguayan former professional football player and manager. As a striker, he notably played for Cerro Porteño, Red Star, and the Paraguay national team.

== Club career ==
González began his career at Paraguayan club Cerro Porteño in 1969, and signed for French club Red Star in 1971. In his first two seasons at Red Star, the club played in the Division 1. However, they were relegated to the Division 2 at the end of the 1972–73 season. González played a key part in l'étoile rouge's promotion back to the top-flight, as he scored 14 goals in 25 matches in the league in the 1973–74 season. In that campaign, he formed a remarkable partnership in attack with Néstor Combin, with the pair combining for a total of 39 goals.

In the Coupe de France, González helped his side reach the quarter-finals on two occasions: in 1972–73 and in 1973–74. He left Red Star in 1975 after four seasons, his tally adding up to 31 goals in 94 league matches, and 33 goals in total in all competitions.

In 1977, González returned to Cerro Porteño. He retired there in 1979.

== International career ==
González made eleven appearances for Paraguay.

== Managerial career ==
In the 1980s, González had short spells as manager of Cerro Porteño, the club for which he formerly played.

== Honours ==
Cerro Porteño

- Paraguayan Primera División: 1970, 1977
