= Torneo República =

Campeonato Nacional de Clubes
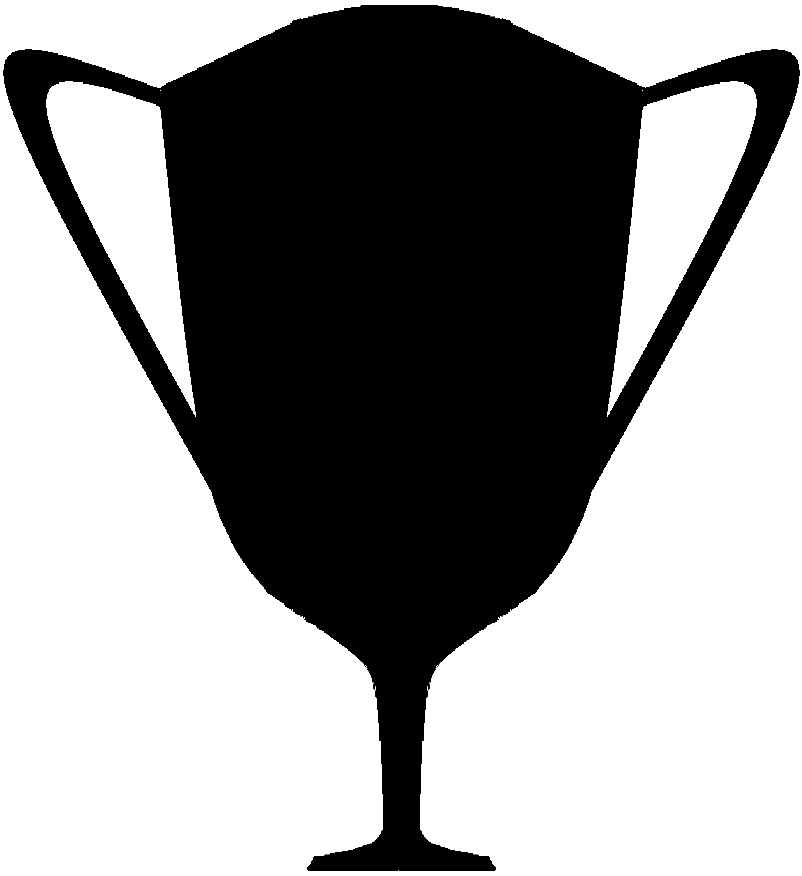
- Founded: 1990
- Country: Paraguay
- Confederation: CONMEBOL
- Number of clubs: 24
- International cup(s): Copa Libertadores; Copa Conmebol
- Most championships: Cerro Porteño (2 titles)

The Torneo República (Republic Tournament) is a defunct official football tournament from Paraguay. The competition was held at the beginning of the year and its purpose was to integrate teams from the Asunción area with teams from other departments in order to give teams from all over the country a chance to qualify for international CONMEBOL tournaments.

== Finals ==
Ed.	Year	Champion	Runner-up
1	1990	Atlético Colegiales	Sportivo Luqueño
2	1991	Cerro Porteño	Sportivo Luqueño
3	1992	Olimpia	Cerro Porteño
4	1993	Cerro Corá	Guaraní (Coronel Oviedo)
5	1995	Cerro Porteño	Libertad

== Performance by club ==
Club	Winners	Runners-up	Winning years	Runners-up years
Cerro Porteño	2	1	1991, 1995	1992
Atlético Colegiales	1	—	1990	—
Cerro Corá	1	—	1993	—
Olimpia	1	—	1992	—
Sportivo Luqueño	—	2	—	1990, 1991
Libertad	—	1	—	1995
Guaraní (Coronel Oviedo)	—	1	—	1993

== Bibliography ==
- Corporación Deportiva Fénix (ed.) Campeones Oficiales. (In Spanish) Retrieved Nov 8, 2012.
- Torres, Carlos (Oct 30, 2012) D10 (ed.) «Los equipos "campesinos" en la Primera División». (In Spanish) Retrieved Dec 20, 2012.
