= Alejandro Delgado (footballer) =

Paraguayan footballer

Personal information
- Position: Midfielder

International career
Years	Team	Apps	(Gls)
1921	Paraguay	1	(0)

Alejandro Delgado was a Paraguayan footballer who played as a midfielder. He represented the Paraguay national team at the 1921 South American Championship, now known as the Copa América.

== International career ==
Delgado was a member of the Paraguayan national team that participated in the 1921 South American Championship, held in Buenos Aires, Argentina, between 2 and 30 October 1921. The tournament was Paraguay's first appearance in the South American Championship and featured four national teams: Argentina, Brazil, Paraguay and Uruguay.

Delgado made his only recorded international appearance on 16 October 1921, when Paraguay faced the host nation Argentina at the Sportivo Barracas ground in Buenos Aires. He played in midfield alongside Manuel Fleitas Solich and Isidoro Benítez Casco. Paraguay lost the match 3–0, with goals scored by Julio Libonatti in the 43rd minute, Blas Saruppo in the 71st minute and Raúl Echeverría in the 76th minute.

Paraguay began the competition with a 2–1 victory over defending champions Uruguay on 9 October, before losing 3–0 to Brazil on 12 October and 3–0 to Argentina on 16 October. The team finished fourth in the tournament, with one victory and two defeats. Argentina won the championship after winning all three of their matches.

The Paraguayan team was managed by Argentine coach José Durand Laguna.

== Career statistics ==
=== International ===
National team	Year	Appearances	Goals
Paraguay	1921	1	0
Total		1	0
