= Denis D'Onofrio =

Italian footballer (born 1989)

Personal information
- Date of birth: 3 July 1989 (age 37)
- Place of birth: Grugliasco, Italy
- Height: 1.80 m (5 ft 11 in)
- Position: Striker

Team information
- Current team: Viareggio

Youth career
- Torino

Senior career*
Years	Team	Apps	(Gls)
2009–2010	Torino	2	(0)
2009–2010	→ Legnano (loan)	28	(5)
2010–	Viareggio		
- * Club domestic league appearances and goals as of 13:26, 19 juin 2010 (UTC)

Denis D'Onofrio (born 3 July 1989 in Grugliasco) is an Italian professional football player currently playing for Viareggio.

He made his Serie A debut for Torino F.C. on 3 May 2009 in a game against ACF Fiorentina when he came on as a substitute in the 72nd minute for Blerim Džemaili. He made another Serie A appearance later in the 2008/09 season.
