= Nicola Ferrari (footballer, born 1989) =

Italian footballer

Personal information
- Date of birth: 14 September 1989 (age 37)
- Place of birth: Formigine, Italy
- Height: 1.82 m (5 ft 11 1/2 in)
- Position: Forward

Team information
- Current team: San Marzano

Youth career
- –2003: Formigine
- –2009: Sassuolo
- 2008–2009: → Sampdoria (loan)

Senior career*
| Years | Team | Apps | (Gls) |
| 2007–2009 | Sassuolo | 3 | (0) |
| 2008–2009 | → Sampdoria (loan) | 0 | (0) |
| 2009–2010 | Viareggio | 19 | (0) |
| 2010 | → Manfredonia (loan) | 11 | (5) |
| 2010–2011 | Fano | 27 | (11) |
| 2011–2012 | South Tyrol | 11 | (1) |
| 2012 | Foligno | 10 | (0) |
| 2012–2014 | Aprilia | 47 | (18) |
| 2014 | Tuttocuoio | 15 | (4) |
| 2014–2015 | Correggese | 33 | (12) |
| 2015–2016 | Mestre | 38 | (21) |
| 2016–2017 | Delta Rovigo | 34 | (14) |
| 2017–2018 | Lentigione Calcio | 38 | (17) |
| 2018–2019 | Mantova | 32 | (10) |
| 2019–2020 | Folgore Caratese | 25 | (12) |
| 2020–2021 | Forlì | 34 | (14) |
| 2021 | Sanremese | 17 | (3) |
| 2021–2022 | Giugliano | 17 | (7) |
| 2022–2023 | Casertana | 33 | (14) |
| 2023– | San Marzano | 0 | (0) |
- * Club domestic league appearances and goals as of 7 May 2023

Nicola Ferrari (born 14 September 1989) is an Italian footballer who plays for Serie D club San Marzano.

== Biography ==
=== Sassuolo ===
==== Sassuolo (youth) ====
Born in Magreta, Formigine, Emilia–Romagna, Ferrari started his professional career with U.S. Sassuolo Calcio. He played for Sassuolo's reserve from ca. March 2006 and spent 1 1/2 seasons for Sampdoria's reserve in Campionato Nazionale Primavera from January 2008.

==== Sassuolo (first team) ====
Before he left Sassuolo, Ferrari made his professional debut on 16 December 2007 and also played the next two game. He earned a call-up to represent Serie C1/A against Serie C1/B, which the team won the tournament.

==== Sampdoria (loan) ====
N.Ferari scored 4 goals in 7 games for Sampdoria reserve in 2007–08 season, as joint-third scorer of the team (along with Guido Marilungo and Stefano Scappini), behind Salvatore Foti (8 goals in half season) and Moussa Diarra (5 goals). However, he did not play any game in the playoff (but Gabriel Ferrari did) except the final. N.Ferrari was the second top-scorer of Sampdoria reserve in 2008–09 season, behind Marilungo. That season Sampdoria was eliminated in the postseason playoffs in the round 16 (first round) by Palermo. The teams draw 3–3 in aggregate but Palermo had more away goal. Ferrari scored once in these three goals. Ferrari also scored 4 goals for the runner-up of 2009 Torneo di Viareggio.

=== Lega Pro clubs ===
Since 2009 Ferrari was farmed to Lega Pro clubs in co-ownership deal, namely Viareggio (swap with Alessio Cristiani), Fano (for €500; €10,000 bought back), South Tyrol (for €500), Foligno and Aprilia. Ferrari only scored regularly in the Lega Pro Second Division, the fourth highest level of Italy, for Manfredonia (January–June 2010), Fano (July 2010–June 2011) and Aprilia (July 2012–June 2013). In June 2013 Aprilia acquired Ferrari outright for free.

In January 2014 he was signed by Tuttocuoio.

=== Serie D ===
On 16 September 2014 he was signed by Correggese.

Before the 2018–19 season, he joined Mantova.

On 7 July 2022, Ferrari signed with Casertana.

== Honours ==
- Serie C1: 2008 (Sassuolo)
- Supercoppa Primavera (Sampdoria reserve)
  - Campionato Nazionale Primavera: 2008 (Sampdoria reserve)
- Serie C1 U21 Tournament: 2008 (Serie C1/A)
