= Club Sol de América =

Paraguayan sports club

Sol de América
- Full name: Club Sol de América
- Nicknames: El Danzarín; El Unicolor; Los Dragones Azules
- Founded: March 22, 1909; 116 years ago
- Ground: Estadio Luis Alfonso Giagni, Villa Elisa, Paraguay
- Capacity: 11,000
- Chairman: Carlos Giagni
- Manager: Ángel Martínez
- League: División Intermedia
- 2025: División Intermedia, 8th of 16
- Website: http://www.soldeamerica.com.py/
Home colours	Away colours	Third colours

Club Sol de América is a Paraguayan sports club, mostly known for its football team. The club is located in Barrio Obrero, Asunción, and was founded in 1909. The stadium Sol de America uses for most of its games is located in the suburb city of Villa Elisa on the border of the capital city, Asunción. Sol de America have won the Paraguayan First Division title on two occasions, in 1986 and then again in 1991. They also have a strong basketball team and an athletics department.

== Honours ==
=== National ===
- Primera División
  - Winners (2): 1986, 1991
- División Intermedia
  - Winners (4): 1965, 1977, 2006, 2023

== Performance in CONMEBOL competitions ==
- Copa Libertadores: 6 appearances

Best: Quarter-finals in 1989
1989: Quarter-finals

== Current squad ==
As of 6 September 2024 Note: Flags indicate national team as defined under FIFA eligibility rules; some limited exceptions apply. Players may hold more than one non-FIFA nationality.

No.	Pos.	Nation	Player
1	GK	PAR	Gerardo Ortiz
2	DF	PAR	Gustavo Giménez
3	MF	PAR	Ángel Aguayo
4	DF	PAR	Rodrigo Delvalle (on loan from Club Cerro Porteño)
5	DF	PAR	Rolando García Guerreño
6	MF	PAR	Jorge Jara
7	MF	PAR	Mudo Valdez
8	MF	ARG	Cristian Amarilla
9	FW	PAR	David Fernández
11	MF	PAR	Luis Ortíz
12	GK	PAR	Mathias Bordon
14	FW	PAR	Fernando Díaz
15	MF	ARG	Juan Cascini
16	DF	PAR	Aquilino Giménez
17	FW	PAR	Juan Ojeda
18	MF	PAR	Derlis Orué

No.	Pos.	Nation	Player
19	FW	PAR	Ronald Roa
20	FW	PAR	Oscar Coronel
21	DF	PAR	Víctor Barrios
22	MF	PAR	Marcelo Gonzalez
23	MF	PAR	Brian Quintana
25	FW	PAR	Fernando Ruiz Diaz
27	FW	VEN	Anthony Graterol
28	GK	PAR	Diego Aranda
29	FW	ARG	Lisandro Cabrera
30	FW	PAR	Ismael Benegas
31	MF	PAR	Marcelo Acosta (on loan from Rosario Central)
32	DF	PAR	Ever Cáceres
34	DF	PAR	Matias Castro
36	GK	PAR	Bernardo Medina
40	FW	PAR	Daniel Dietze

== Notable players ==
To appear in this section a player must have either:

- Played at least 125 games for the club.
- Set a club record or won an individual award while at the club.
- Been part of a national team at any time.
- Played in the first division of any other football association (outside of Paraguay).
- Played in a continental and/or intercontinental competition.

1970s

- (Paraguay) Secundino Aifuch (1971–75)
- (Paraguay) Teresio Centurión (1976-1980 and 1981-1989)

1990s

- (Paraguay) Gustavo Neffa (1996–98)

2000s

- (Paraguay) Enrique Vera (2000–02)
- (Argentina) Fabián Caballero (2000)
- (Paraguay) Cristian Bogado (2004)
- (Paraguay) Pablo Zeballos (2005–07)
- (Paraguay) Miguel Ángel Cuéllar (2007)
- (Brazil) Josías Paulo Cardoso Júnior (2009–2011)

2010s

- (Brazil) Glacinei Martins (2010–2011)
- (Uruguay) Sebastian Abreu (2016–)

Non-CONMEBOL players

- (Canada) Abraham Francois (2001)
- (Italy) Massimiliano Ammendola (2013–14)

== Managers ==
- (Hungary) Ferenc Puskás (1985–86)
- (Uruguay) Sergio Markarián (1987–89)
- (Paraguay) Ever Hugo Almeida (Jan 1, 1997 – Jan 1, 1999), (Jan 1, 2000 – Jan 1, 2001)
- (Argentina) Ricardo Dabrowski (2011–2013)
- (Paraguay) Gualberto Jara (2013)
- (Uruguay) Mauricio Larriera (2013)
- (Argentina) Roberto Pompei (2013–2014)
- (Argentina) Daniel Garnero (2015–2016)
- (Argentina) Fernando Ortiz (2017)
- (Argentina) Fernando Ortiz (2018)
- (Bolivia) Pablo Daniel Escobar (2019–2020)
- (Argentina) Luis Islas (2020)
- (Paraguay) Celso Ayala (2020–2021)
- (Argentina) Juan Pablo Pumpido (2021–2022)
- (Paraguay) Celso Ayala (2022)
- (Argentina) Pablo Guiñazú (2022)
- (Paraguay) Gustavo Bobadilla (2022–2023)
- (Paraguay) Cesar Castro (2023)

== Other sports ==
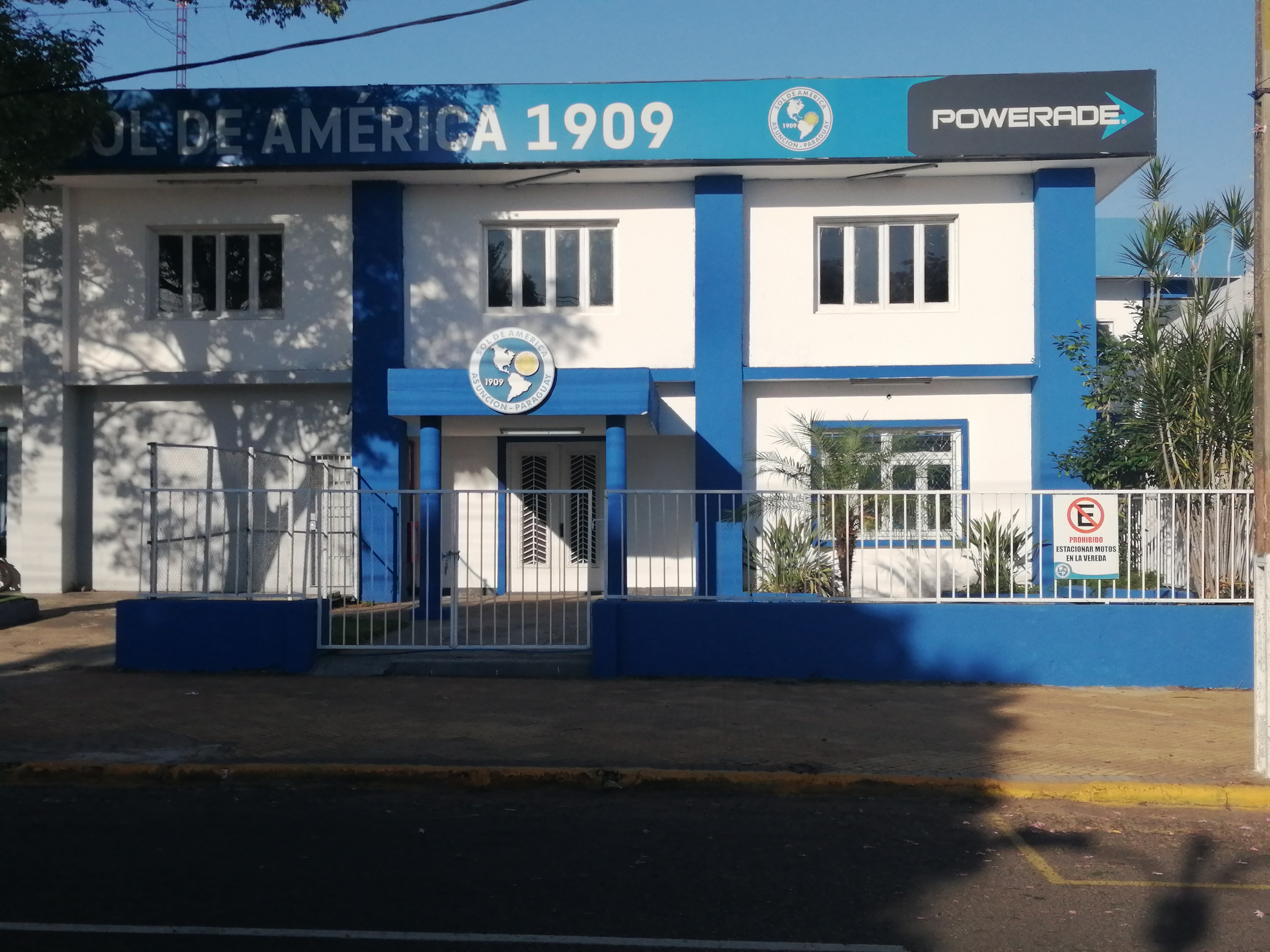
Exterior view of the headquarters of the club from the 5ta Proyectadas Street in 2020

=== Athletics ===
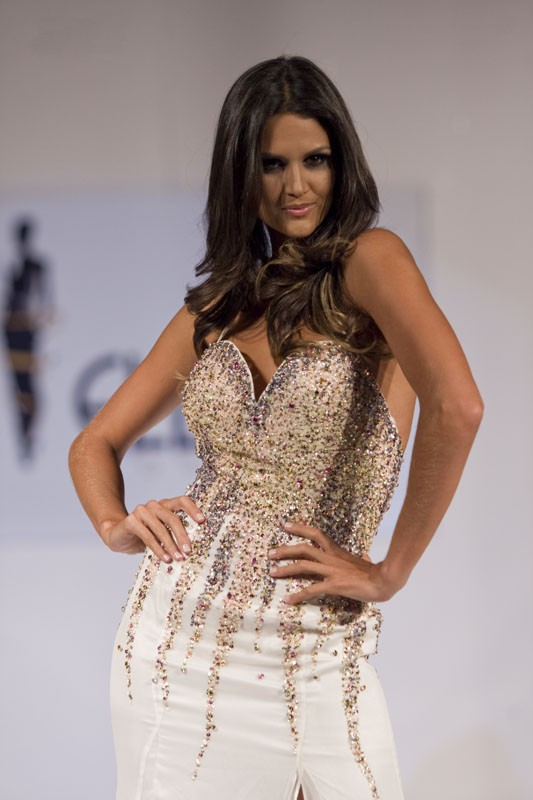
Leryn Franco is a director of the athletics department at Club Sol de América

Sol de América also has an athletics department affiliated with the Federación Paraguaya de Atletismo. Physical preparers of the club are Edgar Torres and 2004, 2008 and 2012 Summer Olympics javelin thrower Leryn Franco.

=== Basketball ===
Sol de América also has a basketball team participating in the Paraguayan Metropolitan Basketball League.

- Paraguayan Championship: 9

1982, 1983, 1984, 1995, 1996, 1998, 1999, 2007, 2010, 2011

== See also ==
List of athletics clubs in Paraguay
