= Estadio General Andrés Rodríguez =

Multi-use stadium in Asunción, Paraguay

Coordinates: 25°15′50″S 57°33′00″W

Estadio General Andrés Rodríguez was a multi-use stadium in Asunción, Paraguay. It was mostly used for football matches and was the home stadium of Club Cerro Corá. The stadium held 4,000 people. After financial issues resulted in a debt of about 300 million Guaraní, the club's properties, including the stadium, were auctioned off in 2015. The club later lost its club license in April 2018 and was removed from Paraguay's league system, and on 5 June 2021, demolition of the stadium began and summarized on 21 June 2021.
