= Club Cerro Corá =

Paraguayan football club

Cerro Corá
- Full name: Club Cerro Corá
- Nickname: Los Potros
- Founded: March 1, 1925; 101 years ago
- Dissolved: 2018; 8 years ago
- Ground: Estadio General Andrés Rodríguez
- Capacity: 6,000
- Chairman: Carlos Pérez Garay
- League: Primera División B Metropolitana
- 2013: Primera División B Metropolitana, 9th
Home colours	Away colours

Club Cerro Corá was a Paraguayan football club based in the city of Asunción (Paraguay). The club was founded March 1, 1925 and played in the Primera División B Metropolitana, the third division of Paraguayan football. Their home games were played at the Estadio General Andrés Rodríguez (named after the former Paraguayan president) which had a capacity of approximately 6,000 seats.

== Honours ==
- Torneo República: 1

1993

- Paraguayan Second Division: 2

1990, 1996

- Paraguayan Third Division: 3

1956, 1968, 1976

== Performance in CONMEBOL competitions ==
- Copa CONMEBOL: 2 appearances

1993: Quarter-Finals
1998: First Round

== Notable players ==
To appear in this section a player must have either:

- Played at least 125 games for the club.
- Set a club record or won an individual award while at the club.
- Been part of a national team at any time.
- Played in the first division of any other football association (outside of Paraguay).
- Played in a continental and/or intercontinental competition.

1990's

- (Paraguay) Ricardo Ismael Rojas (1990)
- (Paraguay) (Japan) Mitsuhide Tsuchida (1991)
- (Paraguay) Casiano Delvalle (1992–1993, 1995)
- (Paraguay) Edgar Aguilera (1993–1998)
- (Paraguay) Julio César Romero (1995)
- (Paraguay) César Augusto Ramírez (1995–1996)
- (Paraguay) Blas López (1997–2001)

2000's

- (Paraguay) Julio César Manzur (2000–2002)
- (Paraguay) Javier Mercedes González (2000–2001, 2003–2004)
- (Paraguay) Antony Silva (2000–2002)

Non-CONMEBOL players
