= Club Nacional =

Paraguayan professional football club

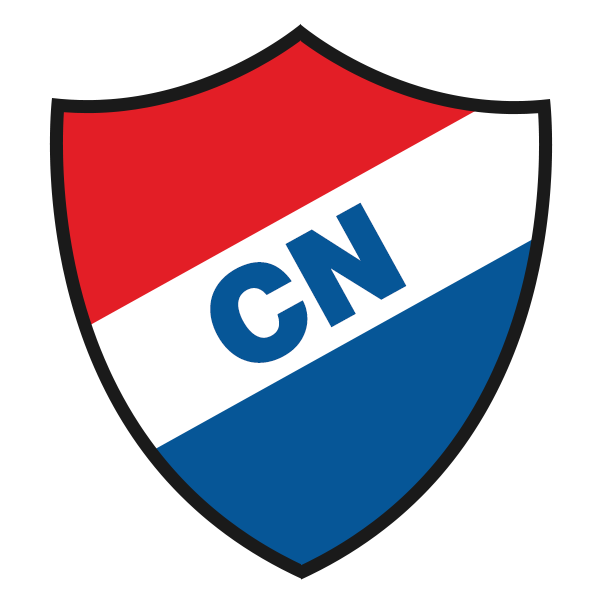
- Full name: Club Nacional
- Nicknames: El Tricolor; La Academia; Albos
- Founded: 5 June 1904; 122 years ago
- Ground: Estadio Arsenio Erico
- Capacity: 7,500
- Chairman: Juan Carlos Galeano
- Manager: Pedro Sarabia
- League: División de Honor
- 2025: División de Honor, 5th of 12
Home colours	Away colours	Third colours

Club Nacional is a Paraguayan professional football club based in the neighbourhood of Obrero in Asunción. Founded in 1904, the club currently plays in the Paraguayan Primera División, and holds its home games at Estadio Arsenio Erico.

Internationally, the club is referred to as Nacional Asunción, in order to distinguish itself from Uruguay's Nacional and Colombia's Atlético Nacional.

== History ==
The club was founded on 5 June 1904, by a group of alumni of the Colegio Nacional de la Capital, one of the oldest public schools in Asunción. The club was originally named Nacional Football Club, taking the name from "Club Nacional de Football" the Uruguayan club, whose shield and three colors were taken to associate the national origin. It is also referred as related to the school the founders attended. Its first president was Víctor Paredes Gómez and white was selected as the team color because that was the color of the Nacional de la Capital School uniform. For the emblem of the club, the colors of the Paraguayan flag were chosen.

Nacional is one of the traditional teams in the Paraguayan league and they have won a total of nine championships so far. Their nickname "La Academia" (lit. 'the academy') was given to them because of their excellent youth system that produced great players such as Arsenio Erico, who is considered as the best Paraguayan footballer of all time.

In 2009 Nacional won their first league title in 63 years.

In 2014, Club Nacional made history by reaching the Copa Libertadores final for the first time ever since its foundation, and by being only the second Paraguayan club to reach the final (after Olimpia).

The club began the campaign with a runner-up finish in the group stage. In the knockout stages, they defeated Argentine clubs Vélez Sarsfield and Arsenal de Sarandí. In the semi-finals, they beat Uruguayan club Defensor Sporting 2–1 on aggregate to set up a final with San Lorenzo. The first leg of the final was played in Asunción and ended 1-1. However, San Lorenzo won the second leg 1–0 at Estadio Pedro Bidegain and took the title with a 2-1 aggregate victory.

== Youth ==
One of the club's youth teams played at the 2009 Torneo di Viareggio, the 2010 Torneo di Viareggio, the 2011 Torneo di Viareggio, the 2012 Torneo di Viareggio and the 2013 Torneo di Viareggio.

== Honours ==
=== National ===
- Primera División
  - Winners (9): 1909, 1911 (undefeated), 1924, 1926, 1942, 1946, 2009 Clausura, 2011 Apertura, 2013 Apertura
- Plaqueta Millington Drake
  - Winners (4): 1942, 1944, 1945, 1946
- División Intermedia
  - Winners (3): 1979, 1989, 2003

== Current squad ==
As of 11 April, 2026

Note: Flags indicate national team as defined under FIFA eligibility rules; some limited exceptions apply. Players may hold more than one non-FIFA nationality.

No.	Pos.	Nation	Player
1	GK	PAR	Gerardo Ortiz
3	DF	PAR	Alexis Cañete
4	DF	VEN	Thomas Gutiérrez (on loan from Sportivo Ameliano)
5	DF	PAR	Gastón Benítez
6	MF	PAR	Silvio Torales
7	FW	ARG	Ignacio Bailone
8	MF	PAR	Fabrizio Jara (on loan from Cerro Porteño)
9	FW	PAR	Hugo Adrián Benítez (on loan from Olimpia)
10	MF	PAR	Carlos Arrúa
11	FW	PAR	Matías Almeida
13	MF	PAR	Leandro Meza
14	DF	PAR	Fernando Díaz (on loan from Unión Santa Fe)
15	DF	PAR	Líder Cáceres (on loan from Atlético Tembetary)
16	MF	PAR	Tobías Sanabria (on loan from Olimpia)
17	MF	PAR	Danilo Santacruz

No.	Pos.	Nation	Player
18	FW	PAR	Iván Valdez (on loan from Independiente Rivadavia)
19	FW	PAR	Lucas González
20	DF	PAR	Rodolfo Argüello
21	DF	PAR	Juan Feliú
22	FW	PAR	Josué Colmán
23	DF	PAR	Carlos Espínola
24	FW	PAR	Roque Santa Cruz
25	MF	PAR	Roberto Ramírez (on loan from Cerro Porteño)
27	FW	PAR	Richard Prieto
28	FW	PAR	Alejandro Samudio
29	DF	PAR	Sebastián Vargas
30	GK	PAR	Santiago Rojas (vice-captain)
33	FW	PAR	Orlando Gaona (captain)
36	MF	ARG	Franco Pelozo

== Notable players ==
To appear in this section a player must have either:

- Been part of a national team at any time.
- Played in the first division of any other football association (outside Paraguay).
- Played in a continental and/or intercontinental competition.

2000's

- (Paraguay) Óscar Cardozo (2004–06)
- (Paraguay) Cristian Bogado (2005–07)
- (Brazil) Glacinei Martins (2005–2006, 2007–2009)
- (Paraguay) Juan Cardozo (2008)

2010's

- (Paraguay) Fredy Bareiro (2014)
- (Paraguay) Julio Santa Cruz (2014–15)
- (Paraguay) Brian Montenegro (2014)
- (Argentina) Ignacio Fideleff (2016–)
- (Argentina) Roberto Nanni (2016–)

Non-CONMEBOL players

- (Australia) Christopher Cristaldo (2016)
- (Guinea-Bissau) Zé Turbo (2019)

== Managers ==
- (Paraguay) Ever Hugo Almeida (1992)
- (Switzerland) Daniel Raschle (2008–2009)
- (Paraguay) Ever Hugo Almeida (2009–2010)
- (Paraguay) Juan Manuel Battaglia (2010–2011)
- (Argentina) Javier Torrente (2012)
- (Paraguay) Gustavo Morínigo (2012–2015)
- (Argentina) Ricardo Dabrowski (2015)
- (Switzerland) Daniel Raschle (2015–2016)
- (Paraguay) Ever Hugo Almeida (2016–2017)
- (Paraguay) Roberto Torres (2017)
- (Paraguay) Celso Ayala (2017–2018)
- (Argentina) Fernando Gamboa (2018–2019)
- (Paraguay) Hugo Caballero (2019)
- (Paraguay) Aldo Bobadilla (2019)
- (Paraguay) Francisco Arce (2019)
- (Paraguay) Roberto Torres (2020)
- (Uruguay) Hernán Rodrigo López (2020–2022)
- (Paraguay) Pedro Sarabia (2022–2023)
- (Argentina) Juan Pablo Pumpido (2023–2024)
- (Argentina) Víctor Bernay (2024–2025)
- (Paraguay) Pedro Sarabia (2025–)
