= Cerro Porteño =

Association football club in Paraguay

- Full name: Club Cerro Porteño
- Nicknames: El Ciclón (The Cyclone); Club del Pueblo (The People's Team); La Mitad más Uno (The Half plus One); El Azulgrana (The Blue And Red)
- Founded: 1 October 1912; 114 years ago
- Ground: Estadio General Pablo Rojas
- Capacity: 45,000
- Chairman: Blas Reguera
- Manager: Gustavo Costas
- League: División de Honor
- 2025: División de Honor, 1st of 12 (Clausura champions)
- Website: www.clubcerro.com
Home colours	Away colours

Club Cerro Porteño is a professional Paraguayan football club, based in the neighbourhood of Obrero in Asunción. Founded in 1912, Cerro has won 35 Primera División titles and is one of the most popular football clubs in Paraguay. Its president is Blas Reguera and the manager is Ariel Holan. Cerro Porteño plays the Paraguayan derby with its main rival Club Olimpia. They play their home games at the 45,000-seat General Pablo Rojas Stadium, also known as La Nueva Olla (The New Boiler), the biggest in the country. They have also never been relegated.

== History ==
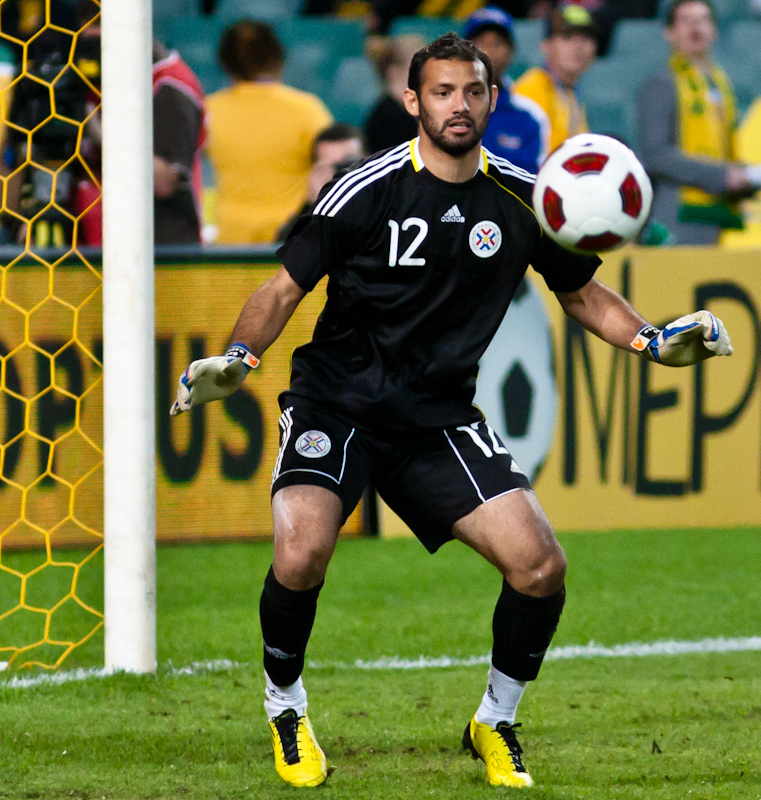
Diego Barreto was formed at the club's youth academy

Cerro Porteño was founded on 1 October 1912 by Susana Núñez and a group of young people looking to create a new football club. At the time of Cerro's foundation, the situation in Paraguay was tense with instability in the government caused by the fervent rivalries between the two leading political parties, the Partido Colorado (Crimson Party) and the Partido Liberal (Liberal Party).

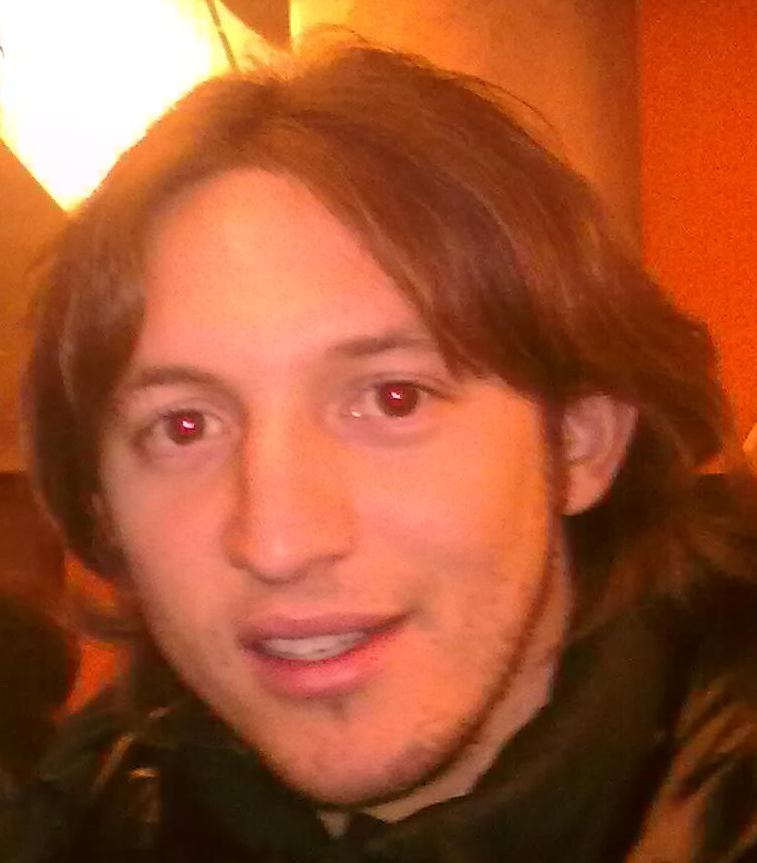
Edgar Barreto graduated from the club's academy to the first-team in 2003

Because of the tensions, the founders of the club decided to use the colours of both parties, red (Colorados) and blue (Liberals), as the club's colours as a symbol of unity and friendship between Paraguayans. Later, white was used on the shorts to incorporate all the colours of the Paraguayan flag.

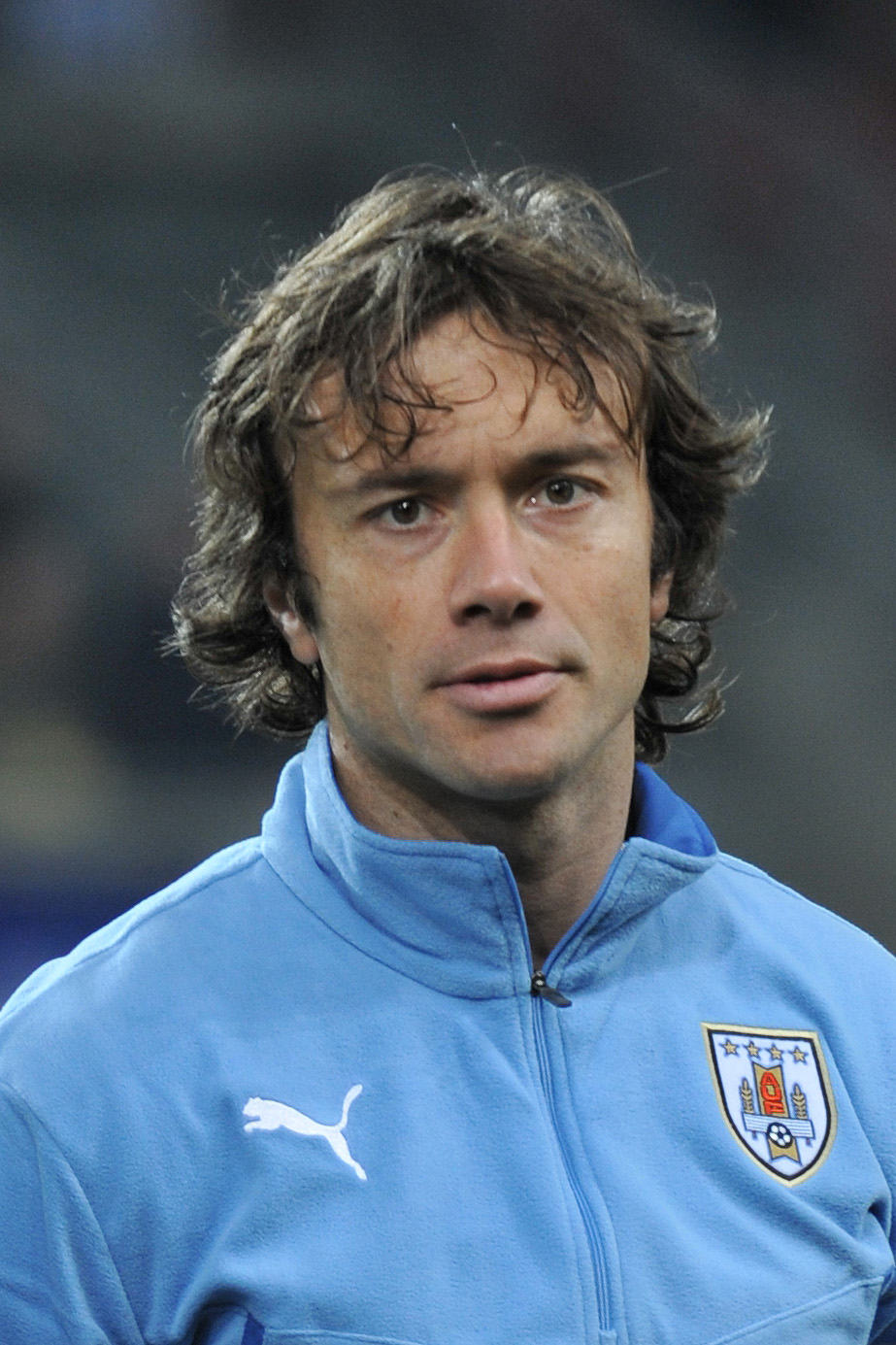
Diego Lugano joined the club in 2015

The club owes its name to the battle fought between the forces of Buenos Aires, Argentina (The Porteños) and the Paraguayan army, in the neighbourhood of the Cerro Mbaé (Mbaé Hill) – named after that battle as the Cerro Porteño (Porteño Hill) – on 19 January 1811. During that battle, the troops of Paraguay (at that time a Spanish colony) were abandoned by the Spanish governor but continued to be led by the Paraguayan officials, who led them to a great victory against the Porteño's troops. That battle is known as the "Battle of Cerro Porteño" and is a highlight of Paraguayan military history.

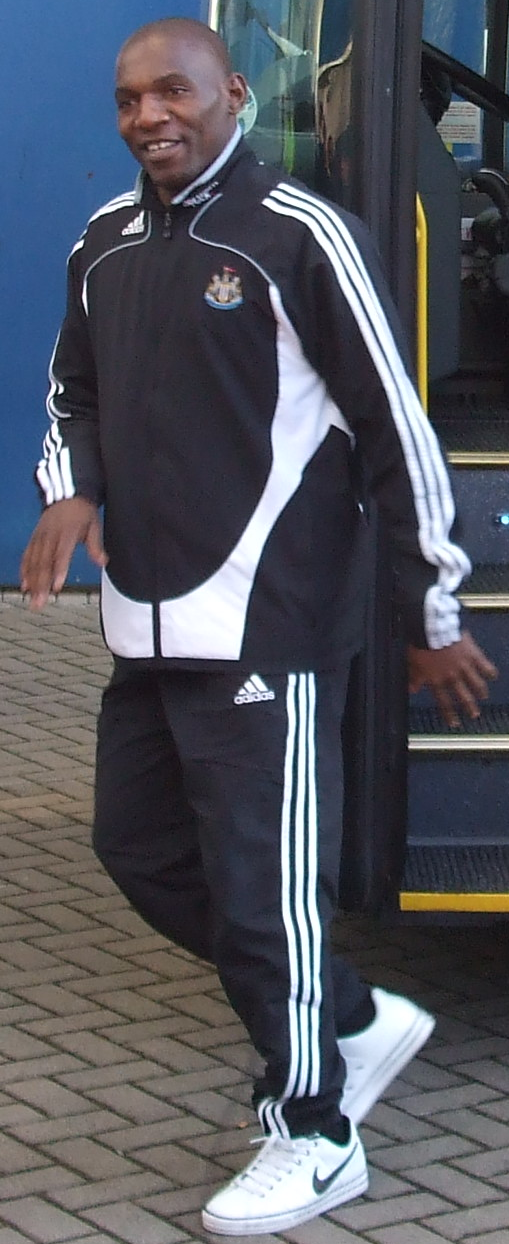
Geremi Njitap played for the club during the 90s.

Over the years the club has won a significant number of national championships. However, to date, it has not won any international tournaments despite a few good runs in the Copa Libertadores including semi-final appearances in 1973, 1978, 1993, 1998, 1999 and 2011.

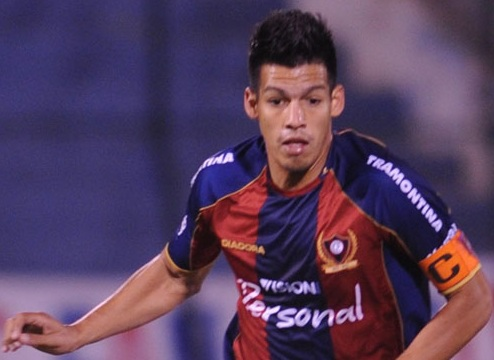
Julio dos Santos was formed at the club's youth academy

Osvaldo Ardiles joined the club as manager in May 2008, but was sacked in August of the same year after a string of poor results and was replaced by Pedro Troglio.

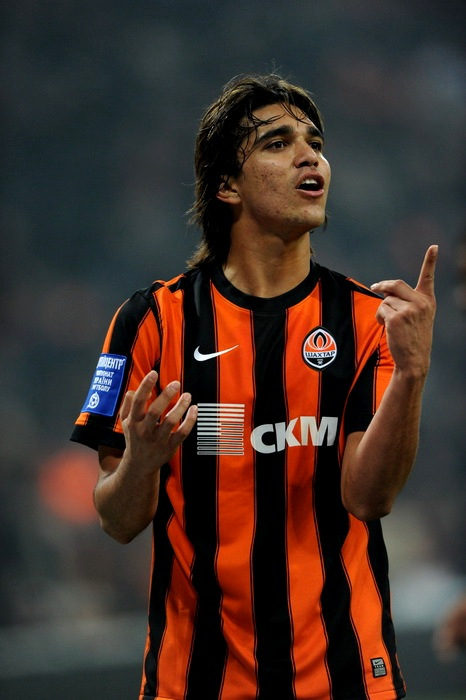
Marcelo Martins joined for club for the 2022 season

In 2014, Cerro Porteño president Juan José Zapag spoke in reference to the corruption in Paraguayan football that various persons had complained to him about not buying games and that if his club were to win then they would not do it by buying and doping players to become champions.

== Stadium ==
Cerro Porteño's stadium, Estadio General Pablo Rojas, also known as "La Nueva Olla" or "La Olla", is located in Asunción's Obrero neighborhood. It has a seating capacity of 45,000, making it the biggest in Paraguay.

== International record ==
- Copa Libertadores: 45 appearances

Best: 1973, 1978, 1993, 1998, 1999, 2011 (Semi-finals)

- Copa Sudamericana: 11 appearances

Best: 2009, 2016 (Semi-finals)

== Honours ==
Cerro Porteño honours
Type	Competition	Titles	Seasons
National	Primera División	35	1913, 1915, 1918, 1919, 1935, 1939, 1940, 1941, 1944, 1950, 1954, 1961, 1963, 1966, 1970, 1972, 1973, 1974, 1977, 1987, 1990, 1992, 1994, 1996, 2001, 2004, 2005, 2009 Apertura, 2012 Apertura, 2013 Clausura, 2015 Apertura, 2017 Clausura, 2020 Apertura, 2021 Clausura, 2025 Clausura
National	Supercopa Paraguay	1	2025
National	Torneo República	3	1978, 1991, 1995
National	Plaqueta Millington Drake	2	1949, 1950

- record
- ^{S} shared record

== Ranking ==
=== World Club Ranking ===
As of November 2025

Rank	Country	Team
98	(Costa Rica)	Alajuelense
99	(Brazil)	Vasco da Gama
100	(Paraguay)	Cerro Porteño
101	(Colombia)	Atlético Bucaramanga
102	(Netherlands)	Ajax

=== South America Club Ranking ===
As of November 2025

Rank	Country	Team
23	(Brazil)	Grêmio
24	(Brazil)	Vasco da Gama
25	(Paraguay)	Cerro Porteño
26	(Colombia)	Atlético Bucaramanga
27	(Argentina)	Huracán

== Players ==
=== First team ===
As of 29 August 2026

Note: Flags indicate national team as defined under FIFA eligibility rules; some limited exceptions apply. Players may hold more than one non-FIFA nationality.

No.	Pos.	Nation	Player
1	GK	ARG	Manuel Roffo
4	DF	PAR	Alexis Cañete
5	MF	PAR	Jorge Morel
6	DF	ARG	Lucas Merolla
7	FW	PAR	Derlis Rodríguez
8	DF	URU	Fabricio Domínguez
10	FW	PAR	Cecilio Domínguez
11	FW	PAR	Juan Iturbe
13	DF	ARG	Guillermo Benítez
14	DF	PAR	Lucas Quintana
15	DF	PAR	Blas Riveros
16	DF	PAR	Iván Ramírez
17	FW	PAR	Gabriel Aguayo
18	MF	PAR	Ariel Gamarra

No.	Pos.	Nation	Player
19	FW	ARG	Pablo Vegetti
20	MF	ARG	Agustín Almendra
21	FW	ARG	Sergio Araujo
23	DF	PAR	Gustavo Velázquez (captain)
24	DF	PAR	Alan Núñez
25	GK	PAR	Gatito Fernández
26	MF	PAR	Robert Piris Da Motta
27	FW	ARG	Jonathan Torres
28	MF	PAR	Carlos Franco
31	FW	ARG	Ignacio Aliseda
35	DF	PAR	Marcelo Chaparro
38	MF	PAR	Amín Cristaldo
40	MF	GER	Mateo Klimowicz
—	GK	PAR	Ángel Martínez

=== Players under contract ===
Note: Flags indicate national team as defined under FIFA eligibility rules; some limited exceptions apply. Players may hold more than one non-FIFA nationality.

No.	Pos.	Nation	Player
—	MF	PAR	Gastón Giménez
—	MF	PAR	Cristhian Paredes

No.	Pos.	Nation	Player
—	FW	COL	Santiago Mosquera

=== Out on loan ===
Note: Flags indicate national team as defined under FIFA eligibility rules; some limited exceptions apply. Players may hold more than one non-FIFA nationality.

No.	Pos.	Nation	Player
3	MF	PAR	Alexis Fariña (at (Paraguay) 2 de Mayo until 31 December 2026)
9	FW	PAR	Luis Amarilla (at (Brazil) Juventude until 31 December 2026)
24	FW	PAR	Héctor Bobadilla (at (Argentina) Platense until 31 December 2026)

No.	Pos.	Nation	Player
32	DF	PAR	Víctor Cabañas (at (Paraguay) Rubio Ñu until 31 December 2026)
33	DF	PAR	Rodrigo Gómez (at (Paraguay) 2 de Mayo until 31 December 2026)

== Notable players ==
To appear in this section a player must have either:

- Played at least 125 games for the club.
- Set a club record or won an individual award while at the club.
- Been part of a national team squad at any time.
- Played in the first division of any other football association (outside of Paraguay).
- Played in a continental and/or intercontinental competition.

1970s

- (Paraguay) Secundino Aifuch (1976–78), (1982)
- (Paraguay) Gato Fernández (1978-84), (1989-91), (1995-97)

1980s

- (Paraguay) Justo Jacquet (1981–88), (1990), (1992-1993)

1990s

- (Paraguay) Francisco Arce (1991–94)
- (Paraguay) Carlos Gamarra (1991–92), (1993–95)
- (Colombia) Faryd Mondragon (1993)
- (Paraguay) Julio César Yegros (1994)
- (Paraguay) Jorge Núñez (1996–99), (2002–03), (2007–08)
- (Uruguay) Ricardo Bitancort (1997)
- (Paraguay) Paulo da Silva (1998)
- (Paraguay) Delio Toledo (1998–99)
- (Argentina) Fabián Caballero (1998–99)
- (Paraguay) Diego Gavilán (1998–99)

2000s

- (Paraguay) Julio dos Santos (2001–05), (2009–2014), (2019–)
- (Paraguay) Édgar Barreto (2002–03)
- (Paraguay) Diego Barreto (2002–07), (2008), (2009–15)
- (Paraguay) Dante López (2003)
- (Bolivia) Diego Cabrera (2003)
- (Brazil) Glacinei Martins (2003–2005)
- (Paraguay) Juan Cardozo (2005–06)
- (Bolivia) Lorgio Álvarez (2005), (2007–08)
- (Paraguay) Roberto Ovelar (2006–07)
- (Paraguay) Marcelo Estigarribia (2006–08)(2016)
- (Paraguay) Pablo Escobar (2006)
- (Paraguay) Gatito Fernández (2007–09), (2012-2014), (2025-present)
- (Paraguay) Celso Ortiz (2007–10)
- (Paraguay) Rodrigo Burgos (2007–12)
- (Paraguay) Iván Piris (2008–11)
- (Argentina) Roberto Nanni (2009–13)

2010s

- (Paraguay) Pablo Zeballos (2010)
- (Paraguay) Fredy Bareiro (2011)
- (Paraguay) Nelson Cuevas (2011)
- (Colombia) Luis Núñez (2011)
- (Paraguay) Jonathan Fabbro (2011–13), (2014–16)
- (Uruguay) Walter López (2012)
- (Uruguay) Rodrigo López (2012–13)
- (Paraguay) Fidencio Oviedo (2012–)
- (Uruguay) Williams Martínez (2013)
- (Ecuador) Paul Ambrosi (2013)
- (Paraguay) Miguel Almirón (2013–15)
- (Paraguay) José Ortigoza (2013), (2014–2017), (2020-)
- (Paraguay) Jonathan Santana (2014–)
- (Argentina) Mauricio Sperduti (2014–15)
- (Uruguay) Diego Lugano (2015)
- (Venezuela) Fernando Amorebieta (2019–2020)

2020s

- (Bolivia) Marcelo Martins Moreno (2022–2023)

Non-CONMEBOL players

- (Cape Verde) Adriano Custódio Mendes (1988)
- (United States) Jerry Laterza (1994–95)
- (Kenya) William Inganga (1996)
- (Cameroon) Tobie Mimboe (1996)
- (Cameroon) Geremi Njitap (1997)
- (Cameroon) Cyrille Florent Bella (1998)
- (Cameroon) Kenneth Nkweta Nju (2000–01)
- (Japan) Nozomi Hiroyama (2001)
- (Costa Rica) Froylán Ledezma (2001–02)
- (Costa Rica) Diego Madrigal (2011)
- (Spain) Daniel Güiza (2013–15)
- (São Tomé and Príncipe) Luís Leal (2016–17)
- (United States) Alan Soñora (2025-present)

== Managerial information ==
Cerro Porteño coaching history from 1913 to present
(Paraguay) Dámaso Ávila (1913); (Paraguay) Eduardo Jara (1914); Unknown (1915–1918); (Paraguay) Humberto Camperchiolli (1919–20); (Paraguay) Clemente Talavera (1920); (Paraguay) Espiridón Galeano (1921); (Paraguay) Clemente Talavera (1921); (Paraguay) Roque J. Medina (1922); Unknown (1923); (Paraguay) Eduardo Jara (1924–25); (Paraguay) Antonio Castagnino (1926); (Paraguay) José A. Caso (1927–28); (Paraguay) Luis Laterza (1929); (Paraguay) Alejandro Delgado (1930–31); (Paraguay) Fausto Menchaca (1932); None (1933–34); (Paraguay) Alejandro Delgado (1935–36); (Paraguay) Manuel Recalde (1936); (Paraguay) Inocencio Agüero (1936); (Paraguay) Pedro P. Cazal (1937); (Paraguay) Inocencio Agüero (1937); (Paraguay) Jacinto Villalba (1937–39); (Paraguay) Benjamín Laterza (1939–40); (Paraguay) Clemente Talavera (1940); (Paraguay) Manuel Recalde (1940); (Uruguay) Athuel Velázquez (1941); None (1942); (Argentina) Juan P. Parodi (1943); (Paraguay) Jacinto Villalba (1944); (Paraguay) Alejandro Delgado (1944); (Paraguay) Garibaldi Bougermini (1944); (Paraguay) José G. Vinsac (1945); (Paraguay) Pedro Osorio (1946–47); (Paraguay) Espiridión Galeano (1947); (Paraguay) Casiano López (1948); (Paraguay) Benjamín Laterza (1948); (Paraguay) Gerardo Buongermini (1948); (Argentina) Héctor Vidal (1949)	(Paraguay) Benjamín Laterza (1950); (Paraguay) Pedro Osorio (1950–51); (Paraguay) Julio Ramírez (1952); (Paraguay) Atilio Mellone (1952); (Paraguay) Luis Benítez Chilavert (1952); (Paraguay) Julio Ramírez (1953); (Paraguay) Benjamín Laterza (1953); (Paraguay) Luis Benítez Chilavert (1953); (Paraguay) Rogelio Negri (1954); (Paraguay) Luis Benítez Chilavert (1954); (Paraguay) Grégorio Juan Esperón (1954); (Paraguay) Benjamín Laterza (1955); (Paraguay) Grégorio Juan Esperón (1955); (Paraguay) Miguel Cabrera (1955); (Paraguay) Antonio Fernández (1955); (Paraguay) Rogelio Negri (1956); (Paraguay) Gabriel Calonga (1956–57); (Paraguay) Luis Benítez Chilavert (1957); (Paraguay) Atilio Mellone (1957); (Paraguay) Benjamín Laterza (1958); (Paraguay) Luis Benítez Chilavert (1958); (Paraguay) Isidoro García (1959); (Paraguay) Sinforiano García (1960); (Paraguay) Luis Benítez Chilavert (1960); (Paraguay) Rogelio Negri (1960–61); (Italy) Vessilio Bártoli (1961–62); (Argentina) Mario Fortunato (1963); (Paraguay) Modesto Bria (1964–65); (Argentina) Mario Fortunato (1966–67); (Paraguay) Egidio Landolfi (1967–69); (Paraguay) Salvador Breglia (1969); (Paraguay) Sinforiano García (1969); (Brazil) Marcos Pavlovsky (1970–71); (Paraguay) Darío Jara Saguier (1971); (Brazil) Gradim (1971); (Paraguay) Salvador Breglia (1972); (Argentina) Néstor Rossi (1972); (Paraguay) Salvador Breglia (1972)	(Brazil) Marcos Pavlovsky (1973–74); (Paraguay) Salvador Breglia (1974); (Paraguay) Sinforiano García (1975); (Peru) Mario González Benítez (1975–76); (Paraguay) Egidio Landolfi (1976); (Paraguay) Salvador Breglia (1976); (Paraguay) Eliseo Báez Riveiro (1976–77); (Paraguay) Salvador Breglia (1977–78); (Paraguay) Egidio Landolfi (1980); (Paraguay) Hugo González (1980); (Paraguay) Egidio Landolfi (1980); (Paraguay) Hugo González (1981); (Paraguay) Robustiano Maciel (1981); (Paraguay) Hugo González (1982); (Paraguay) Ramón Rodríguez (1983); (Argentina) Oscar Malbernat (1983–84); (Paraguay) Silvio Parodi (1984); (Paraguay) Saturnino Arrúa (1984); (Paraguay) Hugo González (1984); (Paraguay) Cayetano Ré (1985); (Paraguay) Saturnino Arrúa (1985); (Germany) Peter Mucha (1986); (Hungary) Ferenc Puskás (1986–87); (Brazil) Valdir Espinosa (1987–88); (Paraguay) Carlos Kiese (1988); (Brazil) Otacílio Gonçalves (1989); (Uruguay) Sergio Markarián (1990–91); (Brazil) Paulo César Carpegiani (1991–92); (Brazil) Valdir Espinosa (1992); (Brazil) Paulo César Carpegiani (1993–94); (Paraguay) Gerardo González Aquino (1994–95); (Brazil) Antônio Lopes (1995–96); (Paraguay) Carlos Kiese (1996); (Uruguay) Jorge Fossati (1997); (Paraguay) Carlos Báez (1998); (Paraguay) Julio Carlos Gómez Cáceres (1998); (Brazil) Jair de Jesús Pereira (1999); (Paraguay) Carlos Báez (1999)	(Paraguay) Saturnino Arrúa (2000); (Uruguay) Luis Cubilla (2000); (Paraguay) Mario César Jacquet (2001–02); (Paraguay) Carlos Báez (2002–03); (Argentina) Gerardo Martino (2003–04); (Argentina) Gustavo Costas (2005–07); (Paraguay) Estanislao Struway (2007); (Brazil) Valdir Espinosa (2007); (Argentina) Javier Torrente (2007 – Dec 31, 2007); (Paraguay) Blas Marcelo Cristaldo (2008); (Argentina) Osvaldo Ardiles (2008); (Argentina) Pedro Troglio (July 1, 2008 – June 5, 2010); (Paraguay) Blas Marcelo Cristaldo (2010); (Argentina) Javier Torrente (Jan 28, 2011 – Feb 14, 2011); (Paraguay) Blas Marcelo Cristaldo (2011); (Argentina) Leonardo Astrada (March 1, 2011 – Sept 26, 2011); (Argentina) Ernesto Corti (2011); (Argentina) Mario Grana (Sept 25, 2011 – April 12, 2012); (Paraguay) Hugo Caballero (2012); (Uruguay) Jorge Fossati (July 1, 2012 – Feb 23, 2013); (Paraguay) Francisco Arce (March 4, 2013–Aug 14); (Argentina) Leonardo Astrada (Aug 28, 2014–15); (Paraguay) Roberto Torres (2015); (Venezuela) César Farías (2016); (Paraguay) Gustavo Morínigo (2016); (Colombia) Leonel Álvarez (2017–18); (Argentina) Luis Zubeldía (2018–2019); (Argentina) Miguel Angel Russo (2019); (Argentina) Víctor Bernay (2019); (Paraguay) Francisco Arce (2019–2023); (Argentina) Facundo Sava (2023); (Paraguay) Diego Gavilán (2023); (Paraguay) Víctor Bernay (2023-2024); (Spain) Manolo Jiménez (2024); (Paraguay) Carlos Jara Saguier (2024-)

== Records ==
Most appearances for the club (in all competitions):

1. Julio Dos Santos: 267
2. Jorge Achucarro: 257
3. Aldo Bobadilla: 265
4. Estanislao Struway: 227

Most goals for the club (in all competitions):

1. Virgilio Ferreira: 90
2. Julio Dos Santos: 88
3. Erwin Ávalos: 70
4. Saturnino Arrua: 88
5. José Vinsac: 58

Most appearances for the club (in league):

1. Salvador Breglia: 225
2. Jorge Achucarro: 215
3. Julio Dos Santos: 212
4. Blas Marcelo Cristaldo: 201

Most goals for the club (in league):

1. Virgilio Ferreira: 67
2. Erwin Ávalos: 64
3. José Vinsac: 58
4. Saturnino Arrua: 55

Most appearances for the club (in international cup):

1. Aldo Bobadilla: 67
2. Estanislao Struway: 64
3. Virgilio Ferreira: 61
4. Blas Marcelo Cristaldo: 57

Most goals for the club (in international cup):

1. Virgilio Ferreira: 23
2. Santiago Salcedo: 15
3. Celino Mora: 14
4. César Ramírez: 13

== Other disciplines ==
=== Women ===
The women's team has won the Paraguayan women's football championship four times, in 2007 and 2012 to 2014. The team then played in the Copa Libertadores Femenina.

=== Youth ===
One of the club's youth teams played at the 2006 Torneo di Viareggio.

=== Futsal ===
The club's futsal division is the best club in the Liga Premium de Futsal, the premier professional futsal clubs league of the country, having won all of its seven editions as of 2025, for which they are known as "Los Dueños del Futsal" (The King of Futsal).
