= List of foreign footballers in Paraguay =

This is a list of non-Paraguayan footballers who currently play or have played Football in Paraguay. For CONMEBOL or South American foreign football players in Paraguay, Argentina, Brazil and Uruguay are the countries that have contributed most players to Paraguayan football. Argentine football players, such as Roberto Acuña and Ricardo Ismael Rojas, played in for several years in Paraguay's leagues and even naturalized themselves to play for the national team. Argentine Héctor Núñez, Uruguayan Hernan Rodrigo Lopez and Brazilian Gauchinho are the only non-Paraguayan football players to be leading goalscorers of the Primera División Paraguaya in a single season, including the Apertura and Clausura. Héctor Núñez is the only foreign player to win the goalscoring title back-to-back (1994–1995), playing for Cerro Porteño. Most non-CONMEBOL or non-South American foreign football players in Paraguay's football leagues have come from African (CAF) countries, especially Cameroon, and from Asian (AFC) countries, especially Japan. Amongst the non-CONMEBOL foreign football players in Paraguay, the most iconic signing in Paraguayan football and the highest paid player in the country's history was the Togolese Emmanuel Adebayor, when he joined Olimpia Asunción in 2020. Between 2008 and 2011, 30 under-15 footballers from Indonesia, including Zikri Akbar and Rahmanuddin played at diverse clubs in Paraguay's Football League. In 2016, Trinidad and Tobago women's national team players Kennya Cordner and Kimika Forbes became the first CONCACAF players in to win a trophy in the CONMEBOL, being crowned champions of the Copa Libertadores Femenina with Paraguayan club Sportivo Limpeño.

== Africa (CAF) ==
Nationality	Player	Club	References
Cameroon	Raphael Onguéné	Deportivo Santaní; 12 de Octubre SD (2015); Cerro Porteño; Cerro Corá	
Cameroon	Kennedy Onguéné	12 de Octubre SD (2015); 3 de Noviembre; Cerro Corá; Sportivo Limpeño (2017)	
Cameroon	Seidou Aboubacar	Sportivo Luqueño (2003)	
Cameroon	Christ Mbondi	Deportivo Capiatá (2016); Olimpia Itá (2017)	
Cameroon	Arsène Maffo	Libertad (2010); Sol de América (2011); Guaraní (2012–2014)	
Cameroon	Leopold Fosso	Libertad (2003)	
Cameroon	Kenneth Nkweta Nju	Cerro Porteño (2000–2001); Libertad (2002); 12 de Octubre (2003); Sportivo Luqueño (2004–2005); Sportivo Trinidense (2008)	
Cameroon	Cyrille Florent Bella	Cerro Porteño (1997–1998)	
Cameroon	Bertrand Tchami	Sportivo Luqueño (1998-1999)	
Cameroon	Geremi	Cerro Porteño (1997)	
Cameroon	Tobie Mimboe	Cerro Porteño (1996); Deportivo Recoleta; 12 de Octubre; Colegiales; Sportivo Luqueño (2004)	
Cameroon	Guy Stéphane Essame	Sportivo Luqueño (2004–2005)	
Cameroon	Celestine Romed Ngah Kebe	2 de Mayo (2006); Sportivo Luqueño (2007–2008)	
Cameroon	Nouga Georges	Sportivo Luqueño (2009–2010)	
Cape Verde	Adriano Tomás Custodio Mendes	Cerro Porteño (1988)	
Ghana	Jackson Acheampong	Cerro Porteño (2018–)	
Guinea-Bissau	Zé Turbo	Nacional Asunción (2019)	
Kenya	William Inganga	Cerro Porteño (1996)	
Morocco	Mourad Hdiouad	Tembetary (1998)	
São Tomé and Príncipe	Luís Leal	Cerro Porteño (2016); Sol de America (2021)	
South Africa	Brad Norman	Sportivo Luqueño (2020)	
Togo	Emmanuel Adebayor	Olimpia Asunción (2020)	

== Asia (AFC) ==
Nationality	Player	Club	References
Australia	Victor Cristaldo	Presidente Hayes (1993–1996); Sport Colombia (1996–1997)	
Australia	Christopher Cristaldo	Nacional Asunción (2016)	
Indonesia	Syahrizal	Sportivo Trinidense (2011); Atlántida Asunción (2011)	
Japan	Takayuki Morimoto	Sportivo Luqueño (2021)	
Japan	Satio Nakagoe	Tembetary; Presidente Hayes	
Japan	Yoshinobu Matsumura	Olimpia Asunción (2008); Silvio Pettirossi (2009)	
Japan	Jumpei Shimmura	General Caballero (2010)	
Japan	Hiroki Uchida	Cerro Porteño PF (2013); Deportivo Santaní (2015)	
Japan	Yuki Tamura	Sportivo Trinidense(2010–2011); Guaraní; Sportivo Luqueño (2011)	
Japan	Kenji Fukuda	Guaraní (2004)	
Japan	Nozomi Hiroyama	Cerro Porteño (2001)	
Japan	Sho Shimoji	Sportivo Luqueño (2011)	
Japan	Hideaki Ozawa	Sportivo Luqueño (2010)	
Japan	Nobuhiro Takeda	Sportivo Luqueño (2000)	
Japan	Riki Kitawaki	Tacuary (2005–2012); 29 de Setiembre; Presidente Hayes (2007)	
Japan	Katsumi Yusa	Sportivo San Lorenzo (2010–2011)	
Japan	Takuma Sugano	River Plate Asunción (2002–2005)	
Japan	Yohei Iwasaki	Independiente CG (2012–2013)	
Japan	Yuta Sasaki	Independiente CG (2014)	
South Korea	Hong Choi	Guaraní (1986)	
South Korea	Jim Sek Balg	General Caballero (1988)	
South Korea	Hee-Mang Jang	Sportivo Trinidense (2017–2018); River Plate Asunción (2019); 12 de Octubre (2020–)	

== Europe (UEFA) ==
Nationality	Player	Club	References
Armenia	Mauro Guevgeozián	Libertad (2013)	
France	Vincent Ramaël	Sportivo San Lorenzo (2016)	
France	Karim Safsaf	Olimpia Itá (2016)	
Germany	Daniel König	River Plate Asunción (2002–2003)	
Italy	Massimiliano Ammendola	Sol de América (2013–2014)	
Portugal	Thiago França	3 de Febrero (2011)	
Spain	Ruben Sanchez Montero	Sportivo Luqueño (2008)	
Spain	Andreu Ramos	Guaraní (2012–2013)	
Spain	Robert Ramos	Guaraní (2012–2013)	
Spain	Mikel Arce	12 de Octubre (2009)	
Spain	Daniel Güiza	Cerro Porteño (2013–2015)	

== North America, Central America & Caribbean (CONCACAF) ==
Nationality	Player	Club	References
Canada	Abraham Francois	Sol de América (2001)	
Costa Rica	Diego Madrigal	Cerro Porteño (2011)	
Costa Rica	Froylán Ledezma	Cerro Porteño (2001–2002)	
El Salvador	Bryan Tamacas	Sportivo Luqueño (2019-)	
Guatemala	Carlos Ruiz	Olimpia Asunción (2009)	
Guatemala	Carlos Figueroa	Olimpia Asunción (2009)	
Guatemala	Mike Gamboa	Cerro Porteño PF (2014)	
Guatemala	Pablo Melgar	Tembetary (1999)	
Guatemala	José Carlos Pinto	Tacuary Asunción (2022–)	
Honduras	John Alston Bodden	Sportivo Luqueño (2014)	
Mexico	Luis de la Fuente	Atlético Corrales (1939–1940)	
Mexico	Enrique Maximiliano Meza	Tacuary (2004–2005)	
Mexico	Alonso Collazo	Deportivo Santaní (2015)	
Mexico	Víctor Gutiérrez	Sportivo 2 de Mayo (2008)	
Mexico	José María Ramírez	Sportivo 2 de Mayo (2008)	
Mexico	Félix Araujo	Sportivo 2 de Mayo (2008)	
Mexico	Alfredo Juraidini	River Plate Asunción (2016)	
Panama	Alberto Zapata	Olimpia Asunción (2004)	
(Trinidad and Tobago) Trinidad & Tobago	Kennya Cordner	Sportivo Limpeño (2016-2017)	
(Trinidad and Tobago) Trinidad & Tobago	Kimika Forbes	Sportivo Limpeño (2016)	
United States of America	Bryan Lopez	Sportivo Luqueño (2004–2013); Fernando de la Mora (2010); Presidente Hayes (2013); Sportivo San Lorenzo (2014)	
United States of America	Jerry Laterza	Cerro Porteño (1994–1995)	

== South America (CONMEBOL) ==
This list is incomplete. You can help by expanding it

Nationality	Player	Club	References
Argentina	Matias Donnet	Olimpia Asunción (2010–2011)	
Argentina	Mauro Boselli	Cerro Porteño (2021–2022)	
Argentina	Leonel Vangioni	Libertad (2020–)	
Argentina	Darío Ocampo	Guaraní (2011–2017); General Díaz (2018–)	
Argentina	Cristian Erbes	Nacional Asunción (2019–)	
Argentina	Hugo Colace	Deportivo Capiatá (2016)	
Argentina	Nicolás Ruiz	Deportivo Capiatá (2010)	
Argentina	Fernando Sanjurjo	River Plate Asunción (2003–2004)	
Argentina	Mariano Jiménez	2 de Mayo (2009)	
Argentina	Cristian Barinaga	2 de Mayo (2009)	
Argentina	Carlos Zorrilla	2 de Mayo (2007–2008, 2010); Deportivo Capiatá (2011–2012)	
Argentina	Cristian Cardozo	12 de Octubre (2008); Sportivo Luqueño (2008); Sportivo Trinidense (2009–2010)	
Argentina	Martín Giménez	Sol de América (2017–)	
Argentina	Raúl Cardozo	Olimpia Asunción (2002)	
Argentina	Benito Montalvo	Tacuary (2011); Cerro Porteño PF (2012)	
Argentina	Franco Ariel Quiroga	Tacuary (2010)	
Argentina	Juan Ignacio Vieyra	Cerro Porteño (2016); Nacional Asunción (2017–)	
Argentina	Alberto Carranza	Guaraní (2005)	
Argentina	Sebastián Ereros	Cerro Porteño (2010)	
Argentina	Hernan Barcos	Guaraní (2005–2006)	
Argentina	Germán Alemanno	Cerro Porteño (2012)	
Argentina	Javier Villarreal	Cerro Porteño (2008–2011); Nacional Asunción (2012)	
Argentina	Miguel Torrén	Cerro Porteño (2010)	
Argentina	Ezequiel Medrán	Cerro Porteño (2010)	
Argentina	Dario Scotto	Cerro Porteño (2000)	
Argentina	Sergio Goycochea	Cerro Porteño (1992); Olimpia Asunción (1993)	
Argentina	Carlos Veglio	Cerro Porteño (1981)	
Argentina	Alfredo Virginio Cano	2 de Mayo (2007–2008); Sol de América (2009–2010); Sportivo Luqueño (2010); Atlético Colegiales (2011–2012); General Díaz (2012–2017)	
Argentina	Marcelo Cañete	Libertad (2016–2017); Guaraní (2017–)	
Argentina	Diego Churín	Cerro Porteño (2017–)	
Argentina	Emanuel Biancucchi	Independiente CG (2011–2012); Rubio Ñu (2017); General Díaz (2017)	
Argentina	Pablo Mouche	Olimpia Asunción (2017)	
Argentina	Pablo Alejandro Izaguirre	Cerro Corá (1999)	
Argentina	Imanol Iriberri	Independiente CG (2010–2012)	
Argentina	Joaquín Irigoytía	Cerro Porteño (2003)	
Argentina	Luciano Civelli	Libertad (2011–2012)	
Argentina	Roberto Nanni	Cerro Porteño (2009–2013); Nacional Asunción (2016–2017)	
Argentina	Juan Manuel Sara	Cerro Porteño (1999–2000, 2009)	
Argentina	Fabian Caballero	Tembetary (1997, 1999); Cerro Porteño (1998–1999); Sol de América (2000); Olimpia Asunción (2005); Tacuary (2006, 2012); Nacional Asunción (2010); Sportivo Ameliano (2013–2014); Deportivo Recoleta (2014)	
Argentina	Mauricio Sperduti	Cerro Porteño (2014–2015)	
Argentina	Juan Carlos Ferreyra	Olimpia Asunción (2010–2011, 2013–2014)	
Argentina	José María Buljubasich	Olimpia Asunción (2009)	
Argentina	Juan Manuel Lucero	Olimpia Asunción (2008–2009); Cerro Porteño (2011–2014); Sportivo Luqueño (2014)	
Argentina	Jonatan Germano	Sportivo Luqueño (2010–2011)	
Argentina	Leandro Gracián	Deportivo Santaní (2015); Rubio Ñu (2016)	
Argentina	Hugo Iriarte	3 de Febrero (2014)	
Argentina	Juan Pablo Raponi	Sportivo Luqueño (2011–2013); 3 de Febrero (2014); Sol de América (2015)	
Argentina	Victor Isaac Acosta	Rubio Ñu (2006–2007)	
Argentina	Daniel Ahmed	Cerro Porteño (1993)	
Argentina	Martín Alarcón	Libertad (1949–1950, 1952–1953)	
Argentina	Julio Alcorsé	Guaraní (2009)	
Argentina	Hugo Jazmín	Deportivo Recoleta (2003); 3 de Febrero (2007); Club Sol de América (2007-2009); General Caballero ZC (2009)	
Argentina	Alejandro Kruchowski	Sol de América (2006–2008)	
Argentina	Diego Herner	Cerro Porteño (2009–2010)	
Argentina	Ignacio Fideleff	Nacional Asunción (2016)	
Argentina	Gabriel Santilli	Sol de América (2011–2012); General Díaz (2013–2014); Rubio Ñu (2014–2015); Deportivo Capiatá (2015)	
Argentina	Agustín Gil Clarotti	Deportivo Capiatá (2016)	
Argentina	Rodrigo Soria	Sportivo Luqueño (2011–2012); Sportivo Carapegua (2012)	
Bolivia	Ovidio Mezza	Libertad (1980); Guaraní (1981–1982)	
Bolivia	Lorgio Álvarez	Cerro Porteño (2005, 2007–2008); Libertad (2008–2009)	
Bolivia	Leandro Gareca	Independiente Campo Grande (2012)	
Bolivia	Diego Cabrera	Cerro Porteño (2003); Deportivo Capiatá (2015)	
Bolivia	Nelson Cabrera	Olimpia Asunción (2004–2005); Cerro Porteño (2005–2008); Sportivo Luqueño (2017–)	
Bolivia	Marciano Saldías	Cerro Porteño (1992)	
Bolivia	Marcelo Moreno Martins	Cerro Porteño (2022–2023)	
Bolivia	Luis Cristaldo	Cerro Porteño (1999–2000)	
Brazil	Carlos Águia	Primero de Marzo; Sport Colombia; Caacupe; 29 de Septiembre; River Plate Asunción; Atlético Colegiales (2019–)	
Brazil	Jefferson Moura	3 de Febrero (2014)	
Brazil	Thiago Araújo da Silva	3 de Febrero (2010–2011)	
Brazil	Igor Goularte	River Plate Asunción (2021-)	
Brazil	Felipe	3 de Febrero (2014)	
Brazil	Bruno Renan	3 de Febrero (2018–)	
Brazil	Geovane Khuchner	3 de Febrero (2018–)	
Brazil	Luiz dos Santos	3 de Febrero (2014)	
Brazil	David Kleber da Silva	Independiente Campo Grande (2018–)	
Brazil	Washington Veiga	3 de Febrero (2014)	
Brazil	Valmir Alves de Oliveira	Silvio Pettirossi (2008–2009)	
Brazil	William Schuster	3 de Febrero (2008–2011); Independiente CG (2011); Sportivo Luqueño (2012–2013)	
Brazil	Gabriel Vieira	General Caballero (2010–2011); Tacuary (2012); Independiente CG (2012); Deportivo Capiatá (2013); Sportivo Carapeguá (2013)	
Brazil	Anderson Omar Lima da Rosa	3 de Febrero (2014)	
Brazil	Tarciso	Cerro Porteño (1987)	
Brazil	James	Deportivo Capiatá (2017–)	
Brazil	Éder	Cerro Porteño (1988)	
Brazil	Dida	Cerro Porteño (1993)	
Brazil	Balu	Cerro Porteño (1993–1995)	
Brazil	Jefferson	Cerro Porteño (1995)	
Brazil	Paulo Roberto	Cerro Porteño (1998–1999)	
Brazil	Glacinei Martins	Cerro Porteño (2003–2005); Nacional Asunción (2005–2006); Olimpia Asunción (2006); Nacional Asunción (2007–2009); Sol de América (2010–2011); Sportivo San Lorenzo (2012)	
Brazil	Josías Paulo Cardoso Júnior	General Caballero (2005–2006); Olimpia Asunción (2006); Choré Central (2007–2008); 2 de Mayo (2008, 2009); Sol de América (2009–2011); General Caballero (2011); Rubio Ñu (2012)	
Brazil	Elías Moreira	Cerro Porteño PF (2013–2015); Sportivo Luqueño (2016–); Resistencia (2017)	
Brazil	Rodrigo Teixeira	Guaraní (2010); Nacional Asunción (2011–2012); Guaraní (2013); Sportivo Luqueño (2014); Deportivo Santaní (2015); Nacional Asunción (2015–2016); Sportivo Trinidense (2016–2017); River Plate Asunción (2018–)	
Brazil	Rafael Baiano	3 de Febrero (2009, 2010–2011); Olimpia Asunción (2010); Independiente Campo Grande (2011)	
Brazil	Diego Balbinot	3 de Febrero (2012–2014)	
Brazil	Jefferson Luis	General Caballero (2006)	
Brazil	Lenon Farias de Souza	Fulgencio Yegros (2017)	
Brazil	Thiago Machado	3 de Febrero (2017)	
Chile	Pedro Reyes	Olimpia Asunción (2004)	
Chile	Marcelo Díaz	Libertad (2021–)	
Chile	Elias Rodriguez	Sport Colombia (2005)	
Chile	Nicolás Peric	Olimpia Asunción (2010)	
Colombia	Freddy Cabezas	Presidente Hayes (2018)	
Colombia	Ariel Sevillano	General Díaz (2013)	
Colombia	Jhon Florez	Deportivo Capiatá (2014)	
Colombia	Farid Díaz	Olimpia Asunción (2017–)	
Colombia	Carlos Valencia	Sportivo Luqueño (2010)	
Colombia	Faryd Mondragón	Cerro Porteño (1993)	
Colombia	Libis Arenas	Sportivo Luqueño (2008)	
Colombia	Luis Núñez	Cerro Porteño (2011)	
Colombia	Carlos Daniel Hidalgo	Guaraní (2012)	
Colombia	Santiago Tréllez	Libertad (2015)	
Colombia	Oswaldo Mackenzie	Olimpia Asunción (2006)	
Colombia	Jorge Herrera	Guaraní (2007)	
Colombia	César Caicedo	Guaraní (2014); General Díaz (2014); Sportivo San Lorenzo (2015); General Caballero (2016)	
Ecuador	Orlen Quintero	Nacional Asunción (2015–2016); General Díaz (2016); General Caballero (2016)	
Ecuador	Luis Capurro	Cerro Porteño (1993)	
Ecuador	Paul Ambrosi	Cerro Porteño (2013)	
Peru	Martín Hidalgo	Libertad (2005–2006)	
Peru	Martín Tenemás	Cerro Porteño PF (2013)	
Peru	Jersi Socola	Cerro Porteño PF (2013)	
Uruguay	Ricardo Bitancort	Cerro Porteño (1991, 1997)	
Uruguay	Ruben Delgado	Guaraní (1997)	
Uruguay	Mathías Corujo	Cerro Porteño (2011–2014)	
Uruguay	Walter Alberto López	Cerro Porteño (2012); Sol de América (2015)	
Uruguay	Hernan Rodrigo Lopez	Olimpia Asunción (2002–2004); Libertad (2005–2007); Cerro Porteño (2012–2013); Sportivo Luqueño (2013); Libertad (2014–2015); Guaraní (2016–2017)	
Uruguay	Diego Lugano	Cerro Porteño (2015)	
Uruguay	Álvaro Pereira	Cerro Porteño (2016–)	
Uruguay	Mauricio Victorino	Cerro Porteño (2017)	
Uruguay	Ignacio Ithurralde	Guaraní (2011)	
Uruguay	Sebastian Abreu	Sol de América (2016)	
Uruguay	Juan Manuel Salgueiro	Olimpia Asunción (2012–2013, 2014–2015); Nacional Asunción (2017–)	
Uruguay	Alejandro Silva González	Olimpia Asunción (2012–2014, 2015–2016)	
Uruguay	Claudio Arbiza	Olimpia Asunción (1995)	
Uruguay	Miguel Amado	Olimpia Asunción (2011–2012, 2014–2015); Guaraní (2016)	
Uruguay	Walter Guglielmone	Guaraní (2010)	
Uruguay	Williams Martinez	Cerro Porteño (2013–2014)	
Uruguay	Leonardo Migliónico	3 de Febrero (2014)	
Uruguay	Óscar Ferro	Guaraní (2001)	
Uruguay	Rubén Rodríguez	Guaraní (2000)	
Uruguay	Ernesto Juárez	Guaraní (1967–1968); Libertad (1969–1970)	
Uruguay	Eduardo Pereira	Guaraní (1974–1977)	
Uruguay	Laddy Nitder Pizzani	Guaraní (1977, 1978)	
Uruguay	Marcelo Palau	Guaraní (2012–2017); Cerro Porteño (2018–)	
Uruguay	Diego Ciz	Olimpia Asunción (2007–2010); Sol de América (2011–2012); Sportivo Luqueño (2013–2014); Rubio Ñu (2014–2015); River Plate Asunción (2016)	
Uruguay	Agustín Ale	Olimpia Asunción (2021–)	
Uruguay	José Luis Sosa	Guaraní (1989)	
Uruguay	Álvaro García	Tacuary (2011–2012)	
Uruguay	Nicolás Núñez	2 de Mayo (2011)	
Uruguay	Miguel Larrosa	2 de Mayo (2007); Sportivo Luqueño (2007–2009)	
Uruguay	Alvaro Peña	Deportivo Capiatá (2015); River Plate Asunción (2016)	
Uruguay	Sergio Órteman	Olimpia Asunción (2002–2004, 2011–2012, 2013); Guaraní (2012–2013); Sportivo San Lorenzo (2015)	
Uruguay	Omar Pouso	Libertad (2008–2011)	
Uruguay	Richard Fernández	Deportivo Santaní (2018)	
Venezuela	Wuiwel Isea	Cerro Porteño PF	
Venezuela	Wilbert Fernandez	Cerro Porteño PF	
Venezuela	Rodderyk Perozo	General Caballero (2016)	
Venezuela	Félix Golindano	12 de Octubre (1999); Olimpia Asunción (1999–2001)	
Venezuela	Luis Paez	Deportivo Capiatá (2016)	
Venezuela	Sergio Alberto Alvarez Castellano	Independiente Campo Grande (2012)	
Venezuela	Christian Esquivel	Olimpia Asunción (2004); General Caballero (2006)	
Venezuela	Rodderyk Perozo	General Caballero (2016)	

== Oceania (OFC) ==
New Zeland - Tim Payne - Olimpia (2026)

== Gallery ==
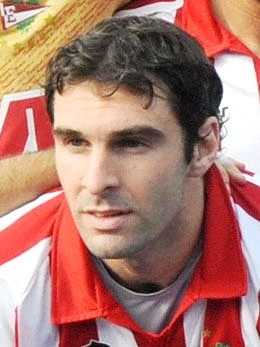
Cerro Porteño signed Argentine striker Mauro Boselli in 2021

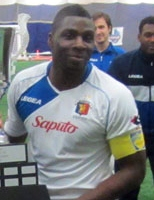
Canadian Abraham François played at Sol de América in 2001

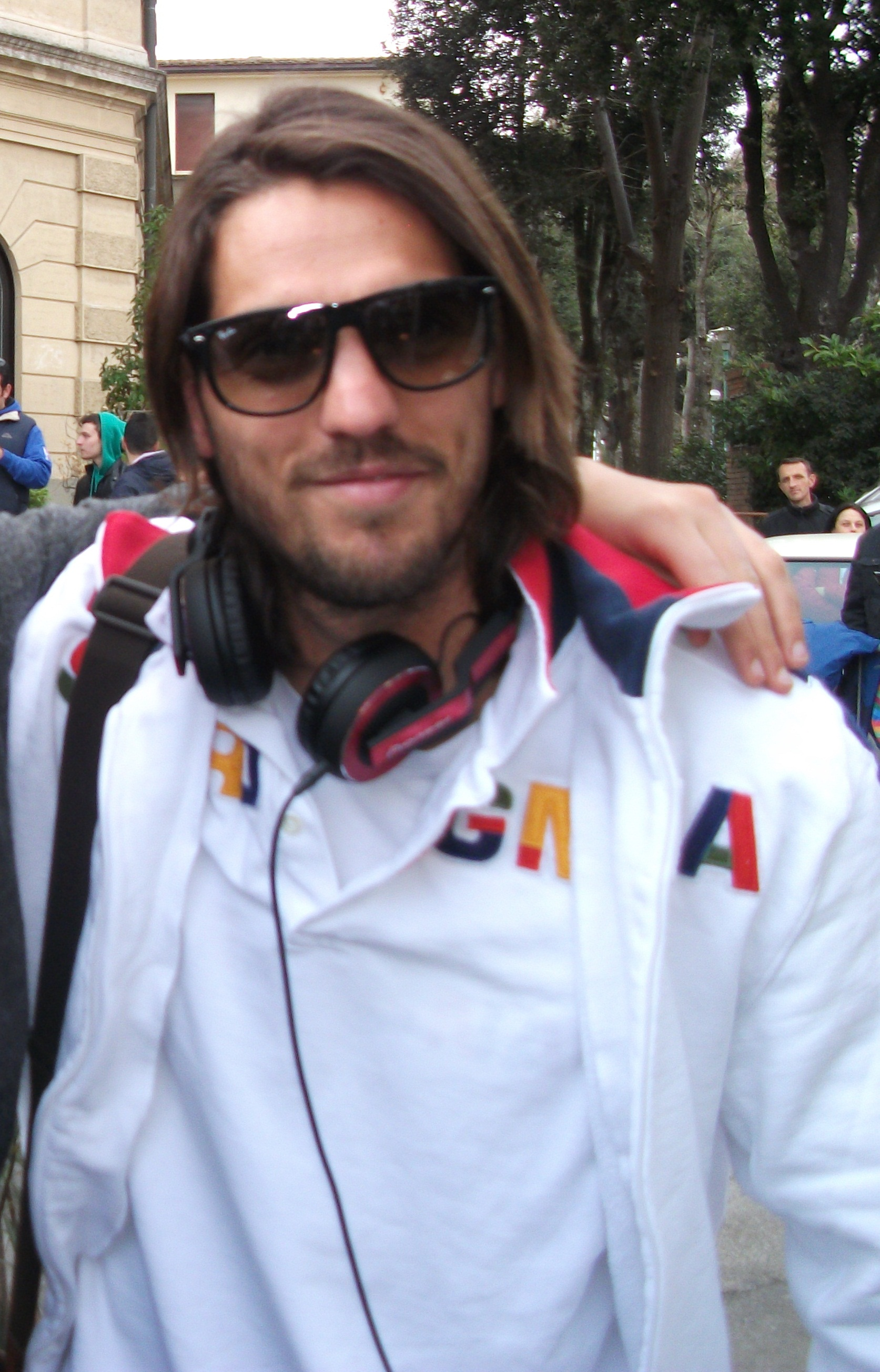
Joaquín Larrivey of Argentine passed for Cerro Porteño in 2019

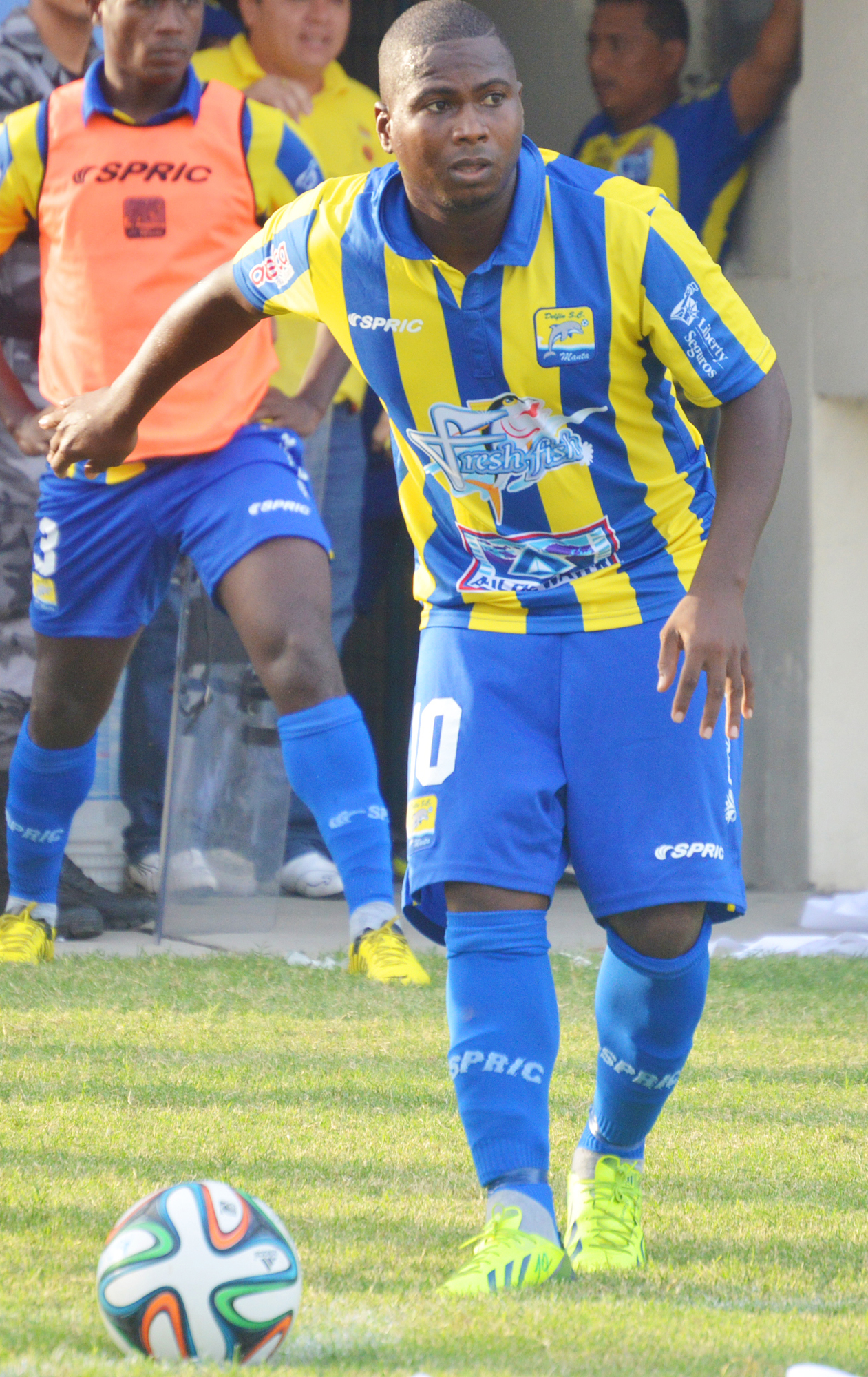
In 2009, Sportivo Luqueno's team featured Ecuador footballer Joffre Pachito

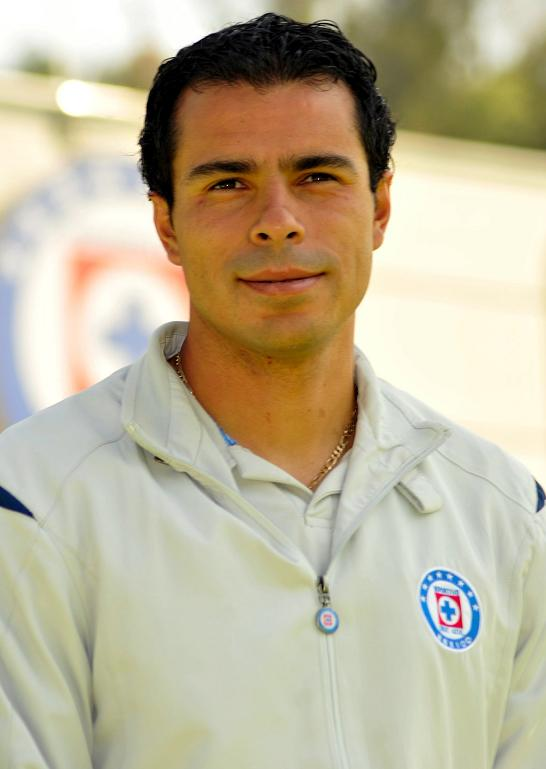
Mexican player Enrique Maximiliano Meza joined Tacuary in 2004 and remained until 2005

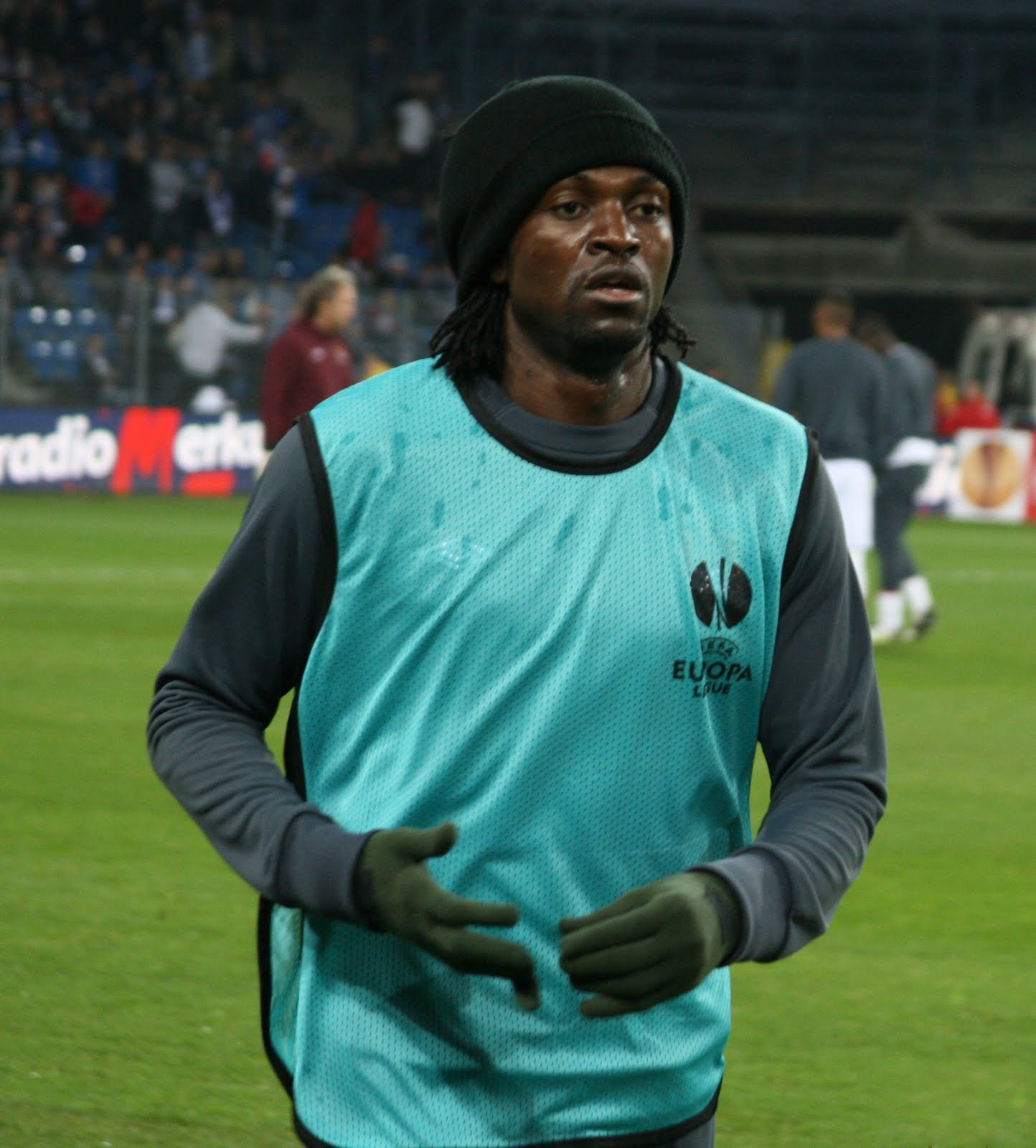
Emmanuel Adebayor became the highest paid player in Paraguayan football history when he signed with Olimpia Asunción in 2020

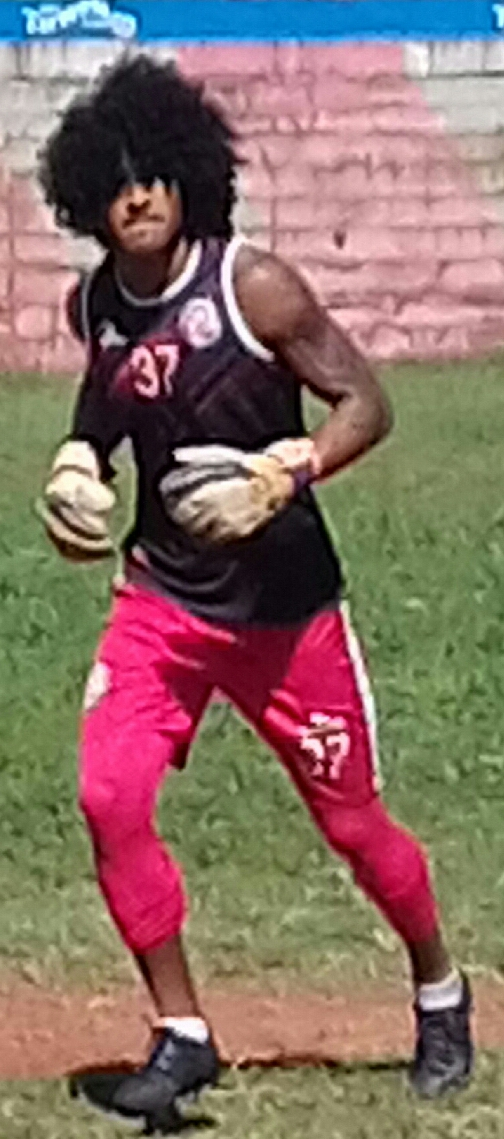
Brazilian goalkeeper Carlos Águia featured for several clubs in Paraguay's leagues

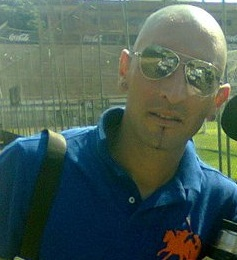
Uruguayan player Sergio Orteman played for many years in the Primera División Paraguaya and became a coach in Paraguay also

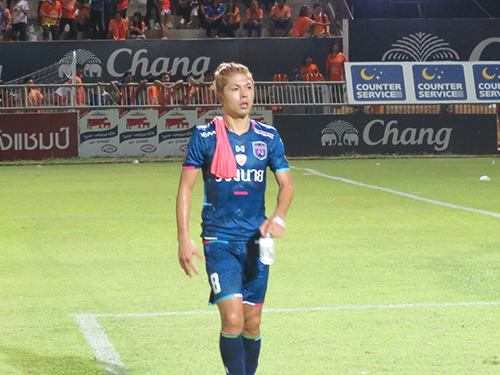
Japanese Midfielder Sho Shimoji appeared for Sportivo Luqueño in 2011

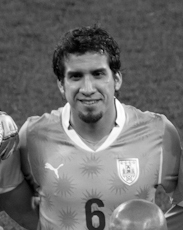
Uruguayan Mauricio Victorino joined Cerro Porteño in 2017

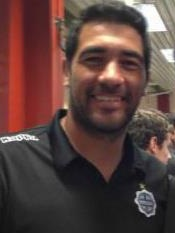
Argentine Juan Carlos Ferreyra endured two stints at Olimpia Asunción and appeared in the 2013 Copa Libertadores Finals

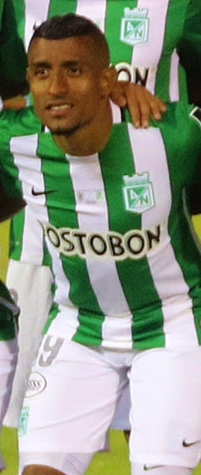
Colombia's Farid Díaz joined Olimpia Asunción in 2017

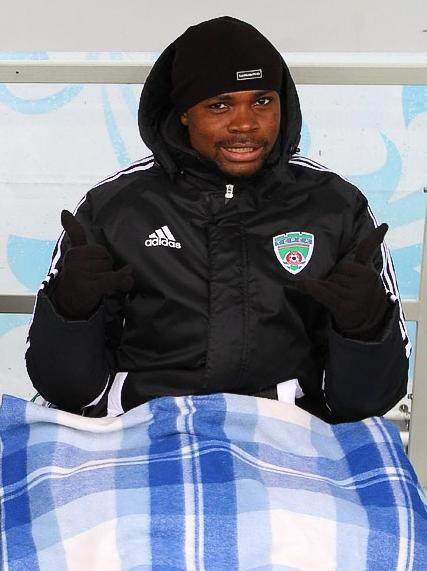
Cameroon Midfielder Guy Stéphane Essame played for Sportivo Luqueño in 2004 and 2005

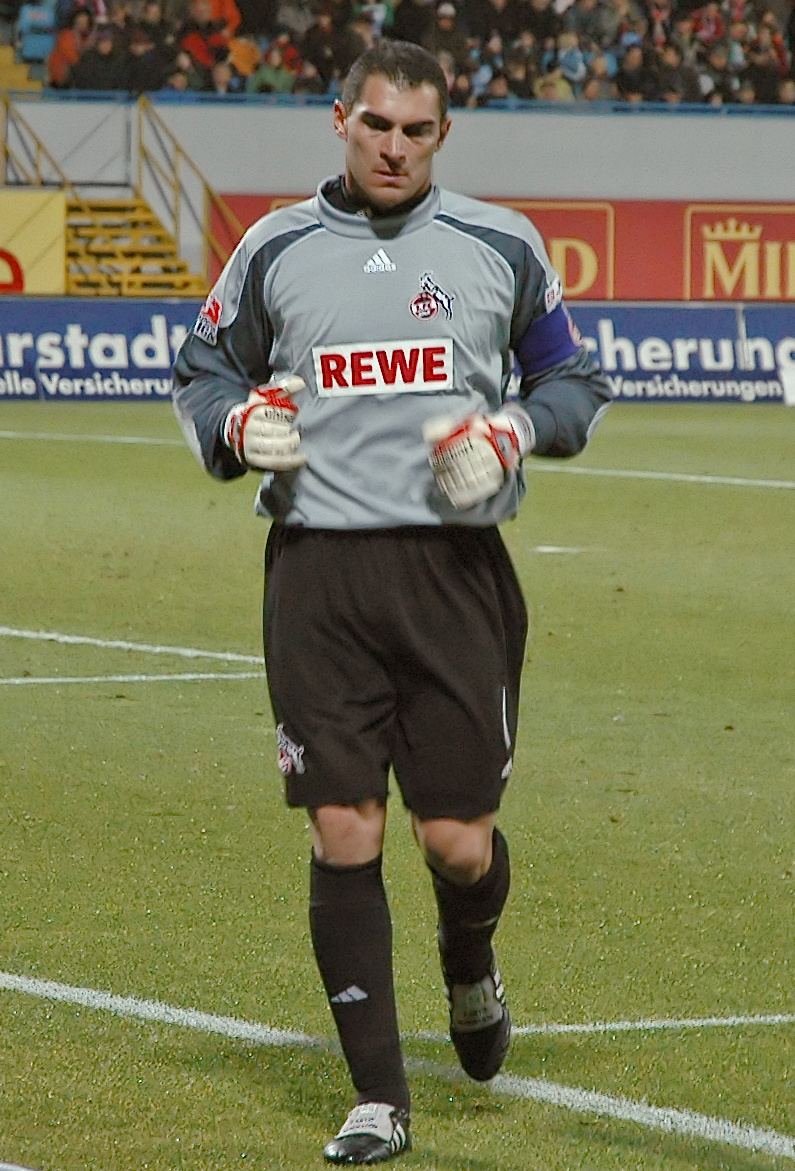
Colombian International Faryd Mondragon played for Cerro Porteño in 1993

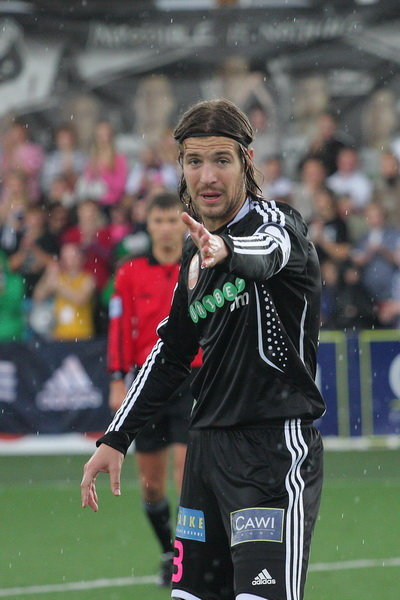
Brazilian Centre Back Diego Balbinot played for 3 de Febrero

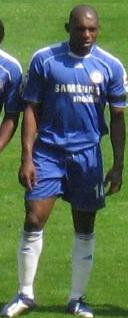
Cameroon player Geremi Njitap at Chelsea, previously played for Cerro Porteño

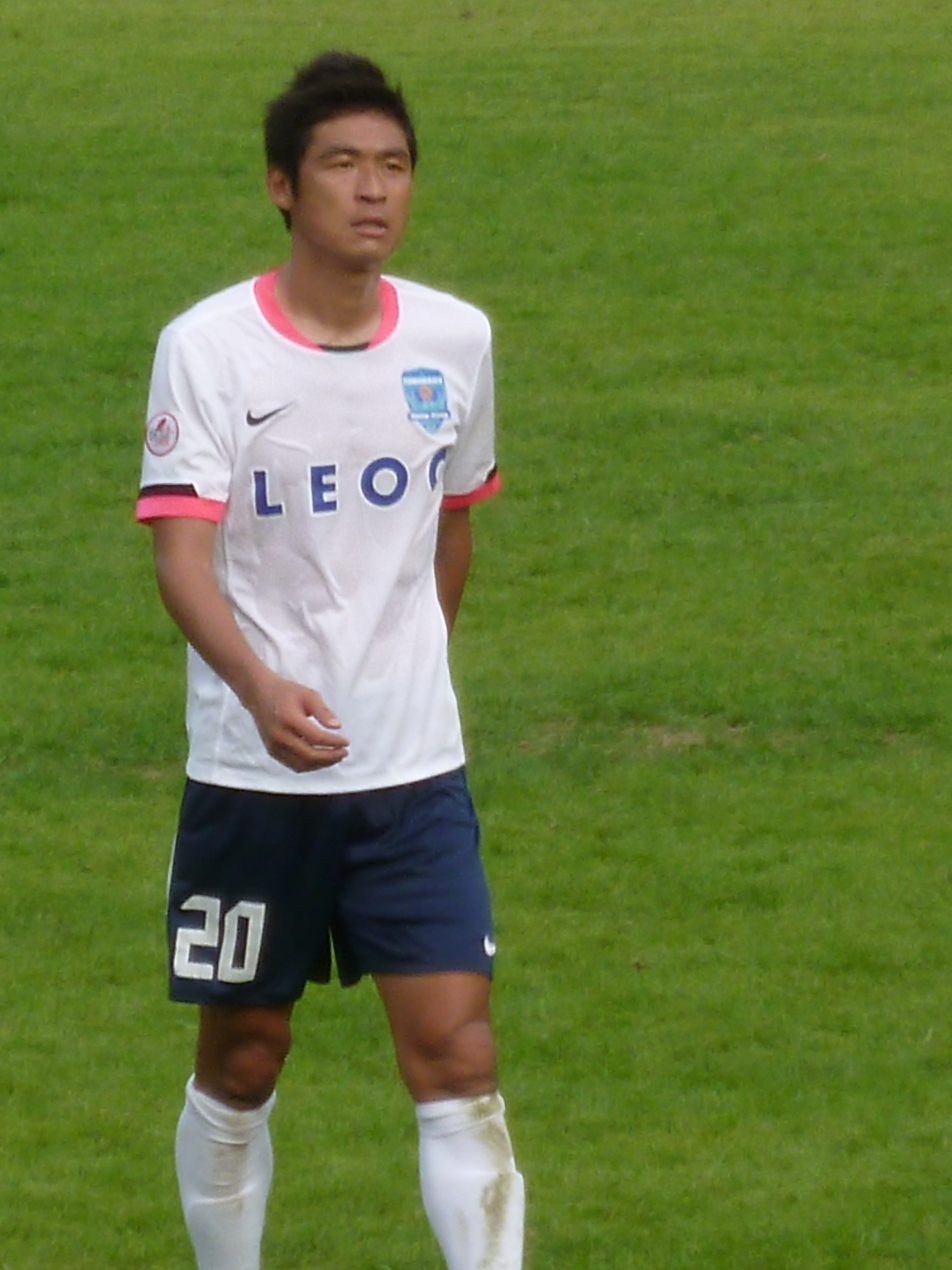
Japanese player Kenji Fukuda joined Guaraní on loan in 2004 before going on to play in Spain, Mexico and Greece

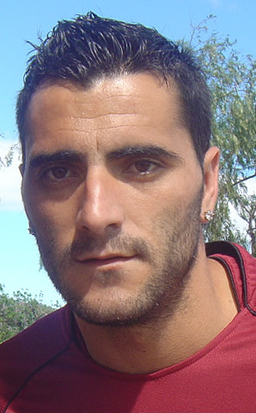
Spanish player Dani Güiza was with Cerro Porteño from 2013 to 2015 and was part of a side which one the club's 30th Primera División title

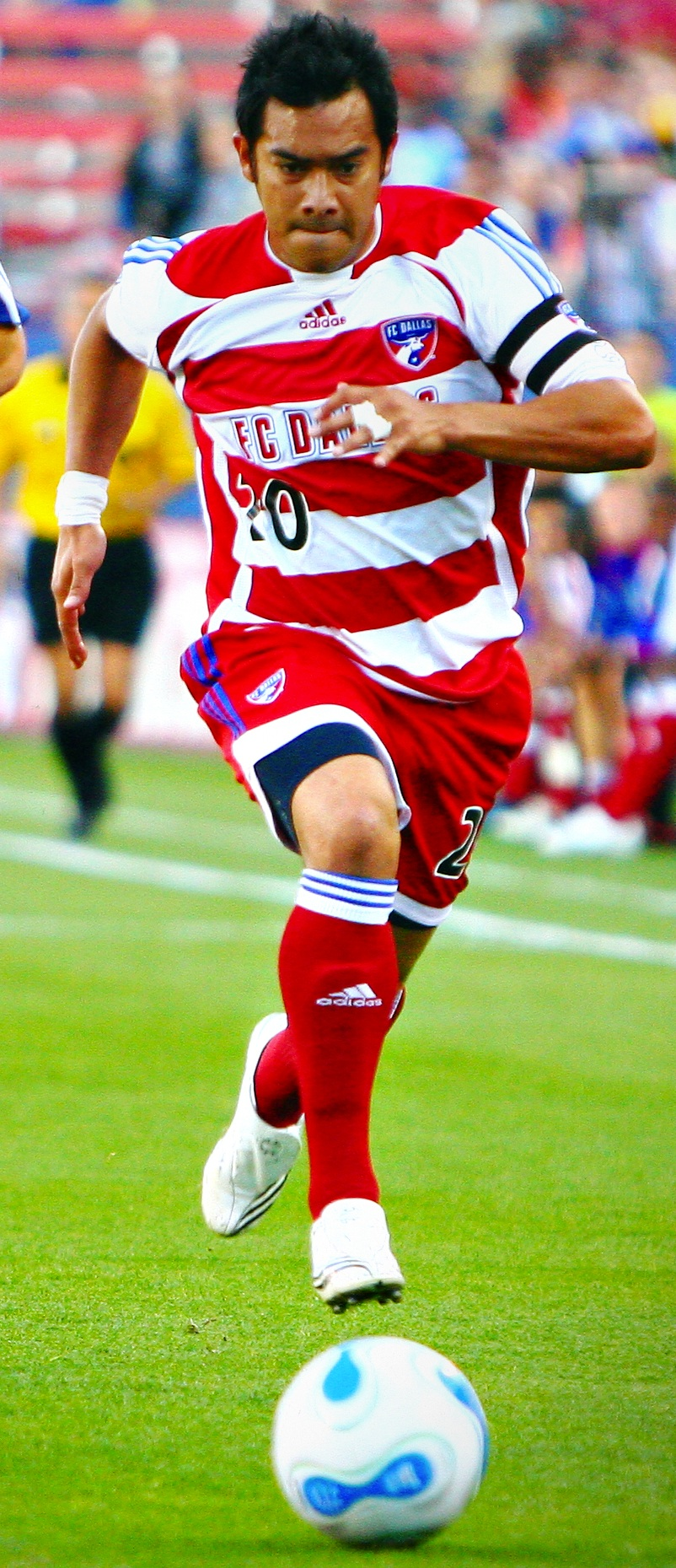
Carlos Ruiz of Guatemala who played for Olimpia Asunción in 2009

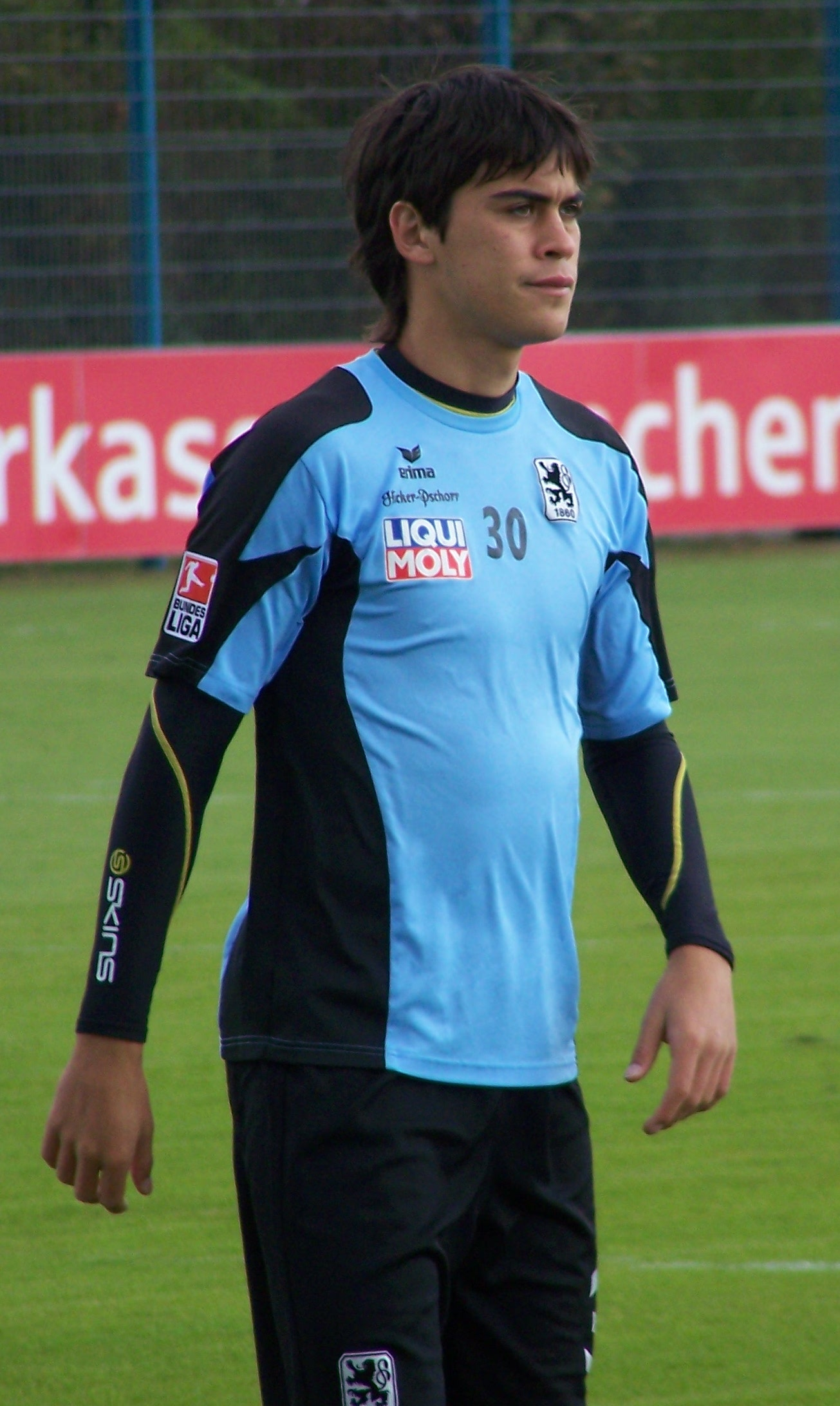
Argentine Emanuel Biancucchi, also referred to as Messi's cousin, endured several seasons in Paraguayan football

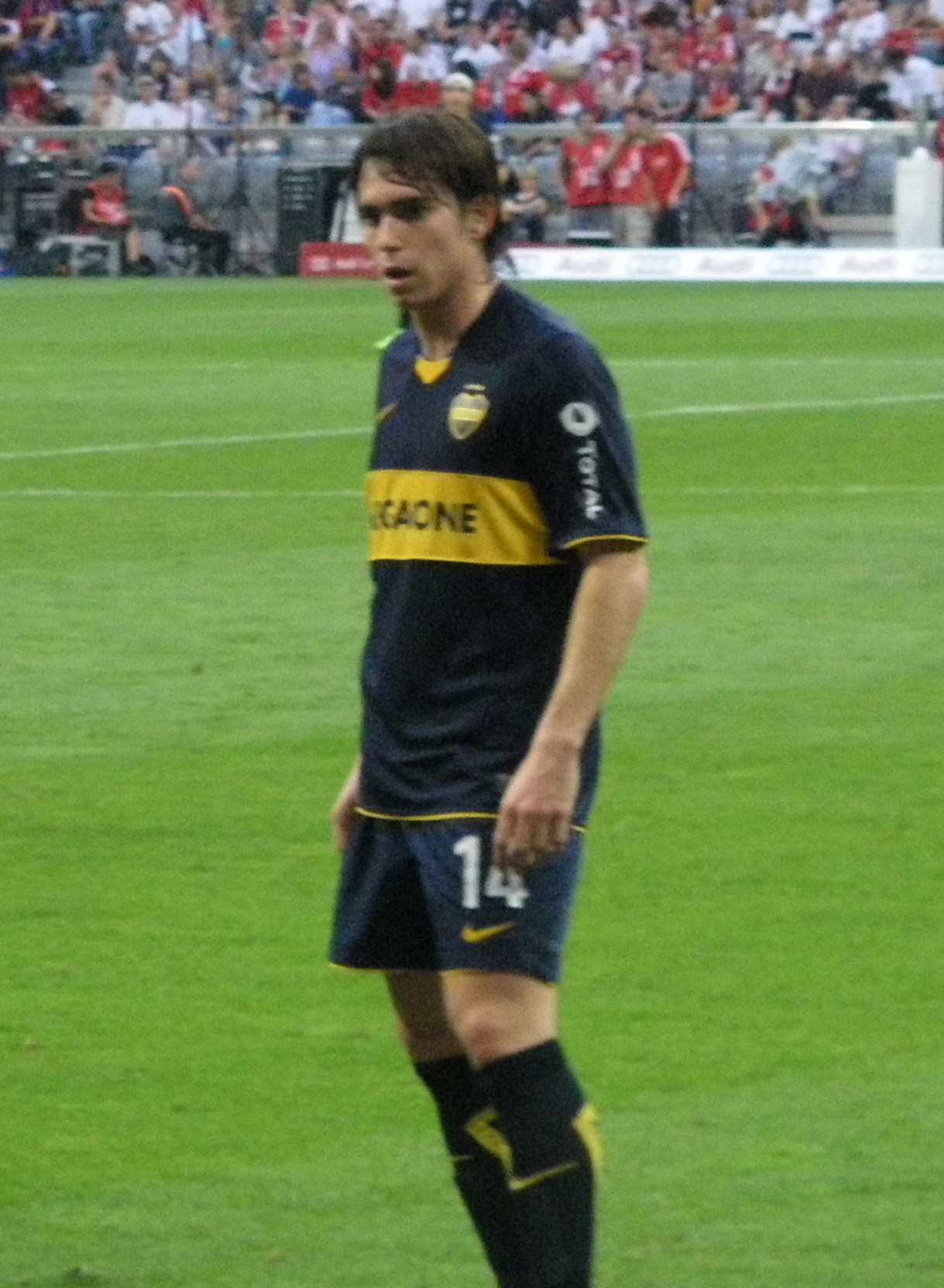
Argentine Mouche played for Olimpia Asunción in 2017

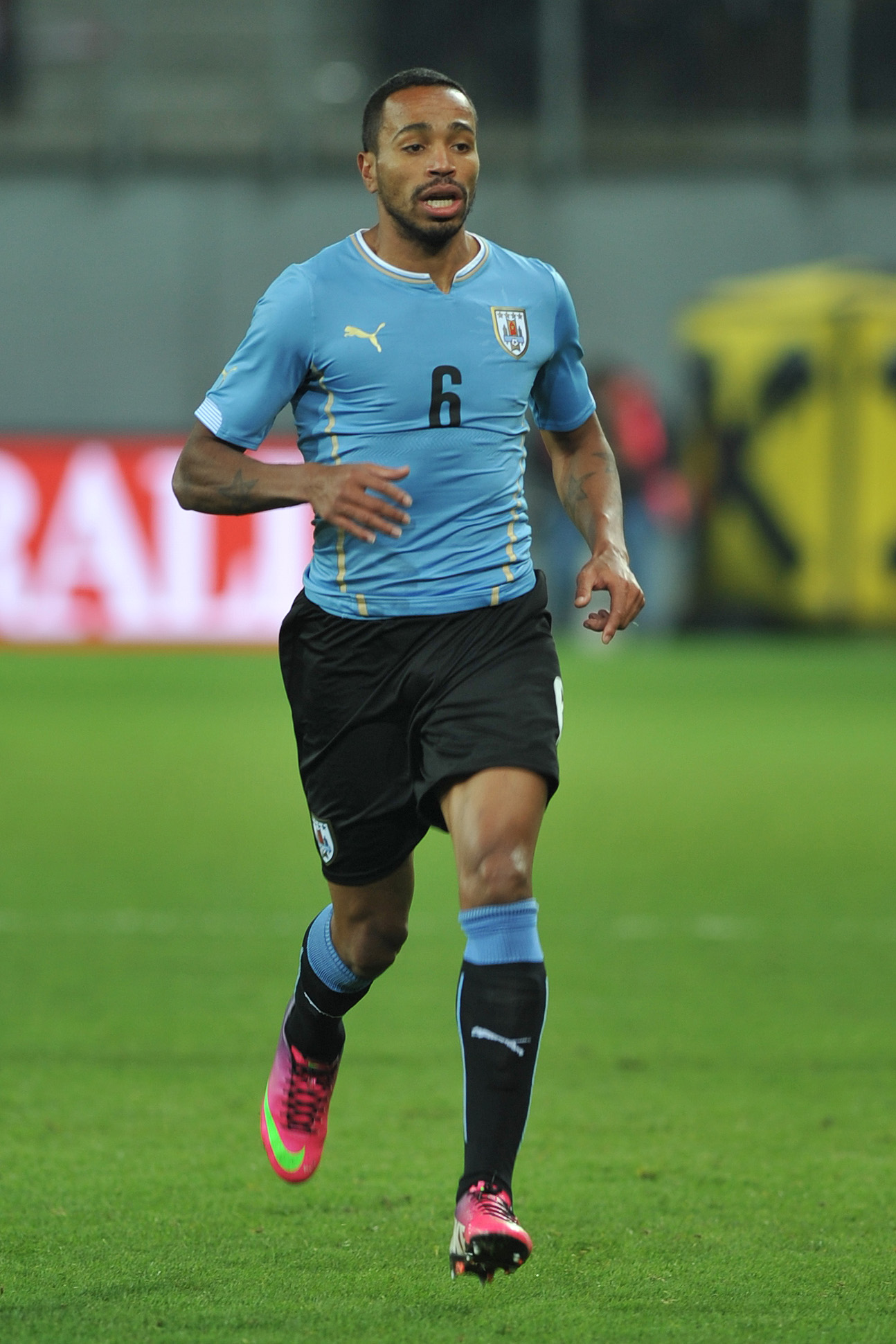
Uruguay's Álvaro Pereira joined Cerro Porteño in 2016

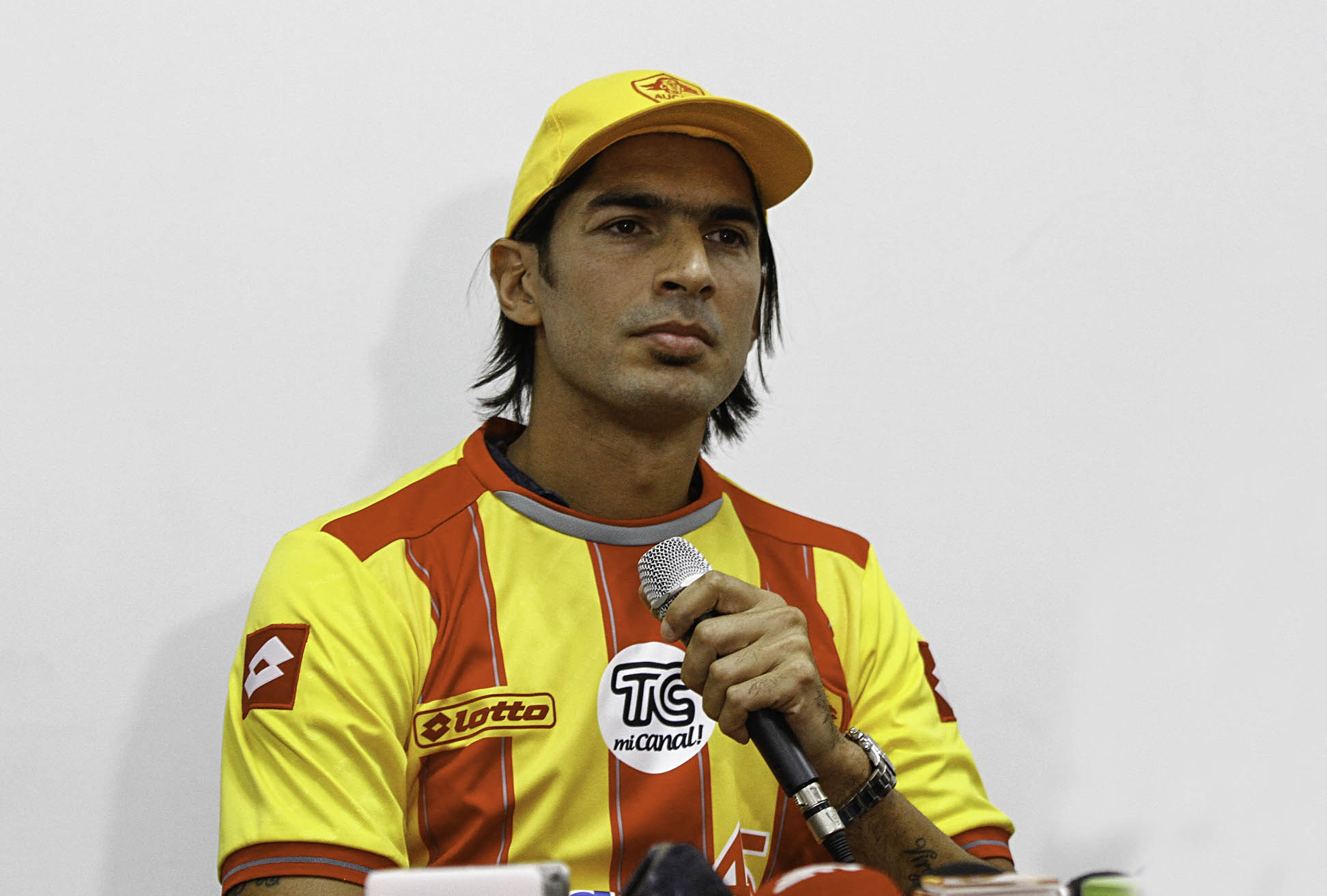
Uruguay's Sebastian Abreu played for Sol de América

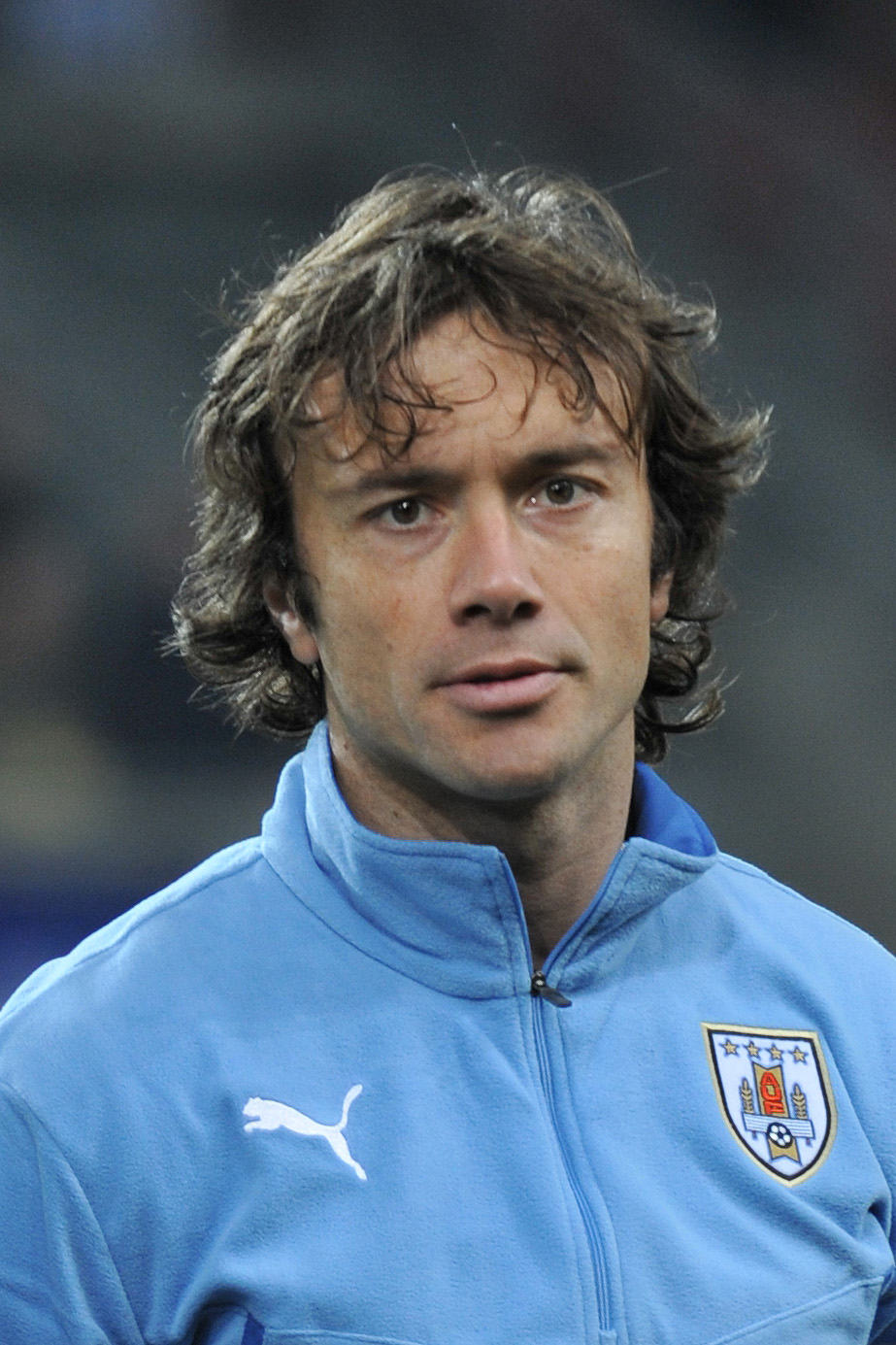
Uruguay's Diego Lugano had a spell with Cerro Porteño in 2015
