= Kenneth Nkweta Nju =

Cameroonian footballer (born 1978)

Kenneth Nju
Personal information
- Full name: Kenneth Nkweta Nju
- Date of birth: 27 July 1978 (age 47)
- Place of birth: Nkambé, Cameroon
- Height: 1.78 m (5 ft 10 in)
- Position: Defender

Senior career*
Years	Team	Apps	(Gls)
2000–2001	Cerro Porteño		
2002	Libertad		
2003	12 de Octubre		
2004–2005	Sportivo Luqueño		
2005–2006	Masafi		
--	General Caballero ZC	--	(--)
2007–2008	Sportivo Trinidense		
- * Club domestic league appearances and goals

Kenneth Nkweta Nju (born 27 July 1978) is a Cameroonian former professional footballer who played as a defender. He played for clubs in Cameroon and Paraguay. He is also the owner of a football school in Paraguay known as 'Soccer City'. During his career, Nju was nicknamed the Cameroonian Roberto Carlos. Between 2000 and 2008, Nju endured sufficiently to perpetuate in the Asociación Paraguaya de Fútbol as one of few non-CONMEBOL players to do this, and holds the longest participation as a CAF footballer in Paraguayan football.

== Career ==
Nkweta Nju was born in Nkambé, Cameroon.

=== Cerro Porteño ===
==== 2000 ====
In January 2000, Nkweta Nju joined Primera División Paraguaya team Club Cerro Porteño. Nju reportedly was awaiting an opportunity in France, but instead received one from Cerro Porteño, which lead to his signing. He converted into one of several footballers from Cameroon to have played for the club, including Geremi Njitap, Cyrille Florent Bella and Tobie Mimboe. In 2000, Nju shared Cerro Porteño's squad with the hierarchy of Paraguayan footballers Guido Alvarenga, Virgilio Ferreira, Estanislao Struway, Jorge Luis Campos, Argentines Dario Scotto and Juan Sara and Bolivian footballer Luis Cristaldo.

==== 2001 ====
The following season, Nju formed part of a squad containing Diego Barreto, Delio Toledo, an 18 year old Julio dos Santos, Costa Rican attacker Froylan Ledezma and Japanese midfielder Nozomi Hiroyama. Nju played in two games of the 2001 Copa Libertadores. In December 2001, Nju departed the club.

=== Libertad ===
In 2002, Nju joined Club Libertad. At Libertad, Nju was coached by the Argentine Gerardo Martino, whom he described as an extraordinary coach.

=== 12 de Octubre ===
For the 2003 Primera División season, Nju joined 12 de Octubre Football Club from the city of Itaguá.

=== Sportivo Luqueño ===
Nju joined Sportivo Luqueño for the 2004 Primera División season, becoming teammates with compatriot Guy Essamé. Both players remained at the club for the 2005 season.

=== Masafi ===
Nju signed with Emirates club Masafi Sports Club for the 2005/06 season.

=== General Caballero ZC ===
Nju played for General Caballero ZC.

=== Sportivo Trinidense ===
In February 2007, Nju attended his first sessions at Sportivo Trinidense, becoming the club's eighth signing. In July 2007, Nju started in a game against Cerro Porteño, playing until the 57th minute as Sportivo Trinidense were defeated 3–0. Between 2007 and 2008, Nkweta Nju played in 24 games for Sportivo Trinidense. During the 2008 season, he was teammates with future Paraguay national team attacker Dario Lezcano.

== Personal life ==
Nju does not consume alcohol and enjoys Paraguayan cuisine, such as sopa paraguaya, chipa guasu and vori vori. Nju has lived in Paraguay since arriving in 2001 and his three children were born in the country. Nju enjoys reading and he constantly capacitates himself to be a good preparer of athletes, owning a sports complex which forms football players.

== Honours ==
Individual

- Seven seasons as foreigner and non-CONMEBOL footballer in the Asociación Paraguaya de Fútbol.

== See also ==
- List of expatriate footballers in Paraguay
- Players and Records in Paraguayan Football
