= Rubén Rodríguez =

Rubén Rodríguez may refer to:

- Rubén Rodríguez (basketball) (born 1953), Puerto Rican former basketball player
- Rubén Rodríguez (footballer) (born 1967), former Uruguayan footballer
- Rubén Rodríguez (baseball) (born 1964), former Major League Baseball catcher
- Ruben Rodriguez (American football) (1965–2026), former American football punter
- Ruben Rodríguez (chess player) (1946–1995)
- Ruben Rodriguez (Artist) (born 2003)

== See also ==
- Coliseo Rubén Rodríguez, a sporting arena named after the basketball player
