= Geremi =

Cameroonian footballer (born 1978)

Geremi Njitap
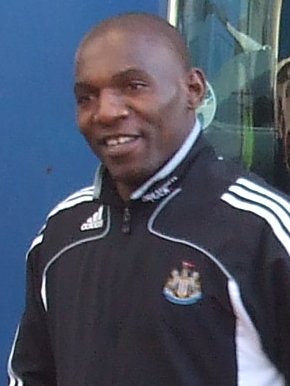
- Geremi with Newcastle United in 2009

Personal information
- Full name: Geremi Sorele Njitap Fotso
- Date of birth: 20 December 1978 (age 47)
- Place of birth: Bafoussam, Cameroon
- Height: 1.77 m (5 ft 10 in)
- Positions: Right-back; midfielder

Senior career*
Years	Team	Apps	(Gls)
1995–1996	Racing Bafoussam	28	(5)
1996–1997	Cerro Porteño	6	(0)
1997–1999	Gençlerbirliği	57	(9)
1999–2003	Real Madrid	45	(2)
2002–2003	→ Middlesbrough (loan)	33	(7)
2003–2007	Chelsea	72	(4)
2007–2009	Newcastle United	49	(2)
2010	Ankaragücü	12	(2)
2010–2011	AEL	10	(0)
Total		312	(29)

International career
1996–2010	Cameroon	118	(13)
Medal record
Men's football
Representing Cameroon
Africa Cup of Nations
Winner	2000 Ghana-Nigeria
Winner	2002 Mali
Runner-up	2008 Ghana
FIFA Confederations Cup
Runner-up	2003 France
Olympics
Gold medal – first place	2000 Sydney
- * Club domestic league appearances and goals

Geremi Sorele Njitap Fotso (born 20 December 1978), known simply as Geremi, is a Cameroonian former professional footballer. He was a versatile player able to play at right-back, right midfield or defensive midfielder, known for his power, pace, combative style and free-kick ability.

The most successful periods of Geremi's club career came at Real Madrid and Chelsea, winning the UEFA Champions League with the first and domestic honours with the latter.

Geremi earned 118 caps for Cameroon from 1996 to 2010, scoring 13 goals. He was a member of their squad for seven Africa Cup of Nations tournaments, winning in 2000 and 2002, as well as the World Cup in 2002 and 2010, and a gold medal at the 2000 Olympics.

== Club career ==
=== Early career ===
Geremi was born in Bafoussam, Cameroon. Raised in a footballing family, Geremi was encouraged to remain focused on school by his father, a former player. But as duties for his club and national teams pulled him away from his studies, he eventually decided to pursue his playing career. Geremi gave up on studying for his university entrance exams and began playing professionally.

Geremi began his career with a local side in Bafoussam, Racing FC, in 1995. A first-division club in Cameroon's MTN Elite One, Racing had won the league championship the year before 16-year-old Geremi arrived. In his only season as a professional at the club, he won the Cameroonian Cup.

=== Cerro Porteño ===
In 1996, Geremi received an offer from Cerro Porteño, which he took, after being scouted whilst playing for the Cameroon U21 national team in Brazil. Before Geremi arrived at Cerro Porteño, agent Pedro Aldave picked between Samuel Eto'o and Geremi to go to Paraguay and join the Asunción club. Geremi was 18 when he arrived at the club.

In 1997, Geremi was teammates with compatriot Cyrille Florent Bella, the Uruguayan Ricardo Bitancort, Brazilian Felippe Ximenes, and Paraguayans Diego Gavilán, Jorge Martín Núñez, Paulo da Silva, Aldo Bobadilla and Roberto Fernández in Cerro Porteño's team. Geremi was the star of the title decider in Paraguay's 1997 Apertura Tournament, which Cerro Porteño lost.

He only disputed one tournament with Cerro Porteño during six months at the club, reportedly not adapting to Paraguayan football. Six months was enough for him to jump to European football. Geremi mentioned that in Paraguay he was too far from his family and wished to go to European football. He received an offer from Turkey, and immediately signed.

=== Gençlerbirliği ===
Geremi spent two seasons in Turkey with Gençlerbirliği, racking up 57 appearances, before a move to Real Madrid materialised for him. In Geremi's first season at Gençlerbirligi in 1997/98, he was teammates with compatriot Tobie Mimboe, who was also a footballer at Cerro Porteño before this.

=== Real Madrid ===
In his three years at the Santiago Bernabéu Stadium, Geremi won two Champions League winners medals with the Spanish giants. He scored two goals whilst at Madrid; his first was a late winner in a 2000 FIFA Club World Championship tie against Raja Casablanca after his side had been reduced to eight men. His second came against Bayern Munich in the quarter-finals of the 2001–02 UEFA Champions League. At Real Madrid, Geremi was nominated for the Ballon d'Or of 2000. In a tribute to Geremi, four years after he left the club, former Real Madrid coach Vicente del Bosque told Spanish newspaper Marca, that Njitap and Steve McManaman were the two most important players in his squad, because "together they kept the whole team united".

Seeking more regular football, Geremi moved to Middlesbrough for the 2002–03 season on a season-long loan from Real Madrid, where he enjoyed a successful season.

In 2003, a sentence from FIFA obliged Cerro Porteño to pay Geremi US$450,000.

=== Chelsea ===
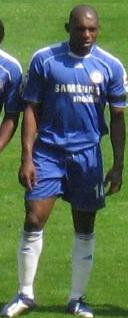
Geremi line up for Chelsea.

After an impressive FIFA Confederations Cup campaign with Cameroon, Chelsea paid Real Madrid £6.9 million for him in July 2003, and he went on to have an excellent first season at Stamford Bridge. Although towards the end of his career at Chelsea, under José Mourinho he was played less regularly and when he was played he was put in his unpreferred position of right-back. Geremi, however, was held in high regard by Mourinho. During an interview, he said about Geremi, "In my team I love to have Geremi on the bench because he's a low-profile player who is ready to help, ready to fight for the team, ready to do the job I want him to do. If I need him to play right-back, he can play right-back. If I need him to play right-winger, he can play right-winger. If I need him to pick up a man and mark him out of the game, he does it." In his final year at Chelsea, Geremi scored the winning goal in a home match against West Ham United, a long-range free-kick. This turned out to be his last goal in a Chelsea shirt. His final appearance for Chelsea came against Liverpool in the Champions League semi-final second leg, which went to penalties. Geremi came on as an extra-time substitute and went on to have his penalty saved by Liverpool goalkeeper Pepe Reina, and Chelsea ultimately lost.

During his time at Chelsea, the club won the Premier League in both 2004–05 and 2005–06, and Geremi was eligible for a winners' medal both seasons as he made 13 and 15 appearances respectively.

=== Newcastle United ===
==== 2007–08 ====
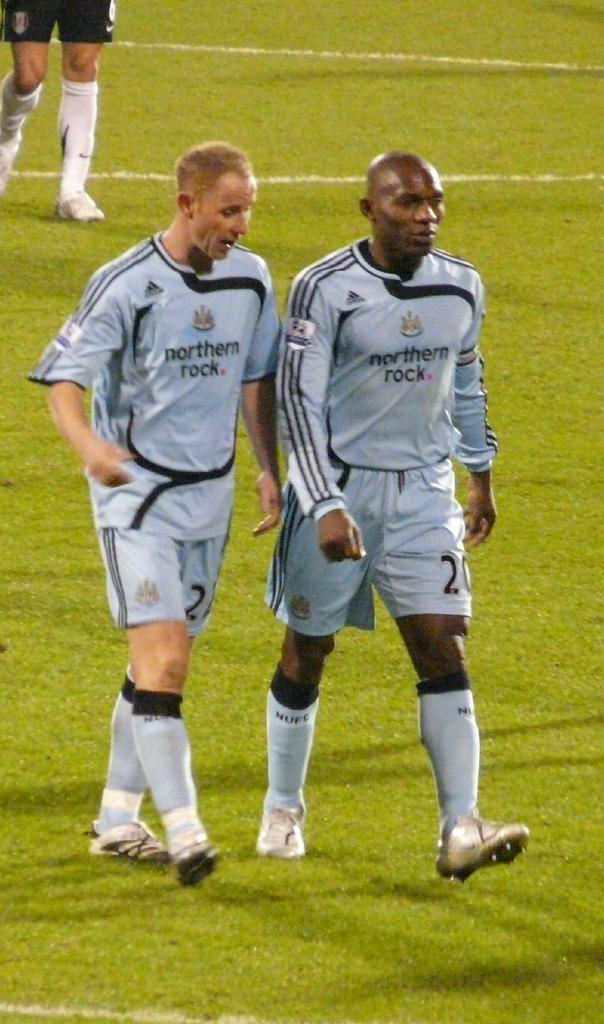
Geremi (right) and Newcastle United´s teammate Nicky Butt.

Geremi signed for Newcastle United on 6 July 2007 on a three-year deal, making him the fourth signing of the summer by manager Sam Allardyce. He was appointed club captain for the 2007–08 season by then manager Allardyce, but lost the armband after new manager Kevin Keegan awarded the captaincy to Michael Owen on 20 January 2008.

Geremi made his Newcastle debut on the opening day of the 2007–08 FA Premier League season in a 3–1 away win over Bolton Wanderers, going on to start the next six games for Newcastle before being an unused substitute in the League Cup third round defeat at Arsenal.

In January 2008, Geremi departed for the 2008 African Cup of Nations with Cameroon. He returned to Newcastle in February after Cameroon finished as runners-up. His first game since returning was on 23 February in a 5–1 away defeat to Manchester United. His first start since returning came on 17 March 2008 in a 1–1 draw away at Birmingham City.

Geremi scored his first goal for Newcastle in a 4–1 victory over Tottenham Hotspur at White Hart Lane on 30 March with a well-taken free-kick and the second a header in the 2–2 draw at Upton Park on 26 April against West Ham. Geremi made 27 league appearances for Newcastle United during his first season at the club, starting 24 of the 27 league games and scoring on two occasions, with five assists.

==== 2008–09 ====
Geremi made his first appearances of the 2008–09 Premier League season appearing as a half time substitute in a 1–0 home win over Bolton on 23 August 2008. In September 2008, Newcastle found themselves under yet another new manager. As a result, Geremi's game time dropped over the course of the season, with the midfielder making 11 league starts without a goal and contributing only three assists. Newcastle was relegated at the end of the season, finishing one point from safety after losing their final game of the season against Aston Villa.

In the 2009–10 season, Geremi's minutes dropped even more dramatically, with only three league starts in the first five months of the season. He scored his third Newcastle goal – and first of the 2009–10 club season – in a League Cup match against Huddersfield Town on 26 August 2009. Geremi left Newcastle in the 2010 January transfer window to join Turkish club MKE Ankaragücü. Shortly after, however, Newcastle said the deal had not been finalized and the player remained at Newcastle. On transfer deadline day, 1 February, Newcastle finally agreed to terms and Geremi went to Turkey on a new 18-month deal.

=== Ankaragücü ===
On 31 January 2010, Geremi's transfer to Ankaragücü of the Süper Lig was announced; he signed a one-and-a-half-year contract with the Turkish club.

=== AEL ===
On 25 August 2010, Geremi moved to Super League Greece club AEL on a two-year contract. On 11 January 2011, it was announced on the official site of Larissa that the contract had been terminated.

== International career ==
Geremi began his Cameroon international career with the youth teams, most notably in the 1995 U-20 Youth World Cup finals. Geremi started all four games for the national team before they lost to Argentina in the quarterfinals.

Geremi's senior debut came not much later, appearing in a match against Gabon in October 1996. From there, the midfielder went on to feature in four of Cameroon's six qualifiers for the 1998 FIFA World Cup, though he was left out of the finals squad after the nation qualified.

Geremi won Olympic Gold with Cameroon in Sydney in 2000 when he captained his country. He has also won two Africa Cup of Nations titles in 2000 and 2002 as they demonstrated their superiority not only in Africa but at world level too.

Geremi was part of the Cameroon side that qualified for the 2002 FIFA World Cup in Japan he also played in all three of Cameroon's World Cup final games in 2002 and scored a free-kick in a 2–2 friendly draw with England shortly before the tournament.

The squad failed to qualify for the 2006 World Cup, finishing one point behind qualifiers Ivory Coast in their table. Geremi started nine of the squad's ten games at holding midfielder, however, and scored twice during the campaign.

The 2008 Africa Cup of Nations brought Cameroon's best finish since 2002, managing to reach the finals before losing 1–0 to Egypt. Geremi again played every one of Cameroon's games and was named to the Team of the Tournament for his performances.

Geremi earned his 100th cap for Cameroon on 11 February 2009, scoring a goal as part of a 3–1 friendly win against Guinea in Paris, a game in which he scored from a free-kick.

Geremi played in 11 2010 World Cup qualification matches Cameroon finished top of Group A in the third round of qualification, scoring one goal along the way.

In January 2010, Geremi and his teammates traveled to Angola for the 2010 Cup of Nations, falling to eventual champions Egypt in a 3–1 extra time loss.

Geremi was part of the Cameroon squad that took part in the 2010 World Cup in South Africa. He played in all three of Cameron's matches as they finished bottom of Group E.

== Personal life ==
Geremi's father, Samuel, is a former footballer who represented Cameroon in the 1970s. Samuel, a striker, was nicknamed "Poison Arrow" for his powerful and accurate finishing. He was allowed five wives due to his status as a footballer, which led to Geremi having 17 siblings.

Geremi's cousin, Pierre Webó, was also a professional footballer and played alongside Geremi for Cameroon at the 2010 World Cup.

Geremi speaks French, English, Spanish and Turkish.

In March 2024, Geremi filed for divorce after discovering his twin children were fathered by his wife's ex-partner.

== Career statistics ==
=== Club ===
Appearances and goals by club, season and competition
Club	Season	League			National cup (Note: Includes Turkish Cup, Copa del Rey, FA Cup, Greek Cup)		League cup (Note: Includes Football League Cup)		Continental		Other		Total	
Club	Season	Division	Apps	Goals	Apps	Goals	Apps	Goals	Apps	Goals	Apps	Goals	Apps	Goals
Racing Bafoussam	1995	Cameroonian Premier League	5	0			–		–		–		5	0
Racing Bafoussam	1996	Cameroonian Premier League	23	5			–				–		23	5
Racing Bafoussam	Total		28	5			—				—		28	5
Cerro Porteño	1997	Paraguayan Primera División	6	0	–		–		4	0	–		10	0
Gençlerbirliği	1997–98	Süper Lig	28	4	3	1	–		–		–		31	5
Gençlerbirliği	1998–99	Süper Lig	29	5	3	1	–		–		–		32	6
Gençlerbirliği	Total		57	9	6	2	—		—		—		63	11
Real Madrid	1999–2000	La Liga	20	0	2	0	–		8 (Note: Appearances in UEFA Champions League)	0	4 (Note: Appearances in FIFA Club World Championship)	1	34	1
Real Madrid	2000–01	La Liga	16	0	0	0	–		8	0	2 (Note: One appearance in UEFA Super Cup, one appearance in Intercontinental Cup)	0	26	0
Real Madrid	2001–02	La Liga	9	0	2	0	–		5	1	0	0	16	1
Real Madrid	Total		45	0	4	0	—		21	1	6	1	76	2
Middlesbrough (loan)	2002–03	Premier League	33	7	1	0	0	0	–		–		34	7
Chelsea	2003–04	Premier League	25	1	1	0	3	0	10	0	–		39	1
Chelsea	2004–05	Premier League	13	0	2	0	1	0	4	0	–		20	0
Chelsea	2005–06	Premier League	15	2	3	0	1	0	2	0	1 (Note: Appearance in FA Community Shield)	0	22	2
Chelsea	2006–07	Premier League	19	1	3	0	3	0	2	0	1	0	28	1
Chelsea	Total		72	4	9	0	8	0	18	0	2	0	109	4
Newcastle United	2007–08	Premier League	27	2	0	0	1	0	–		–		28	2
Newcastle United	2008–09	Premier League	15	0	0	0	2	0	–		–		17	0
Newcastle United	2009–10	Championship	7	0	0	0	2	1	–		–		9	1
Newcastle United	Total		49	2	0	0	5	1	–		–		54	3
Ankaragücü	2009–10	Süper Lig	12	2	0	0	–		–		–		12	2
AEL	2010–11	Super League Greece	10	0	1	0	–		–		–		11	0
Career total			312	29	21	2	13	1	43	1	8	1	397	34

=== International ===
Appearances and goals by national team and year
National team	Year	Apps	Goals
Cameroon	1996	3	0
Cameroon	1997	9	0
Cameroon	1998	4	0
Cameroon	1999	4	0
Cameroon	2000	9	0
Cameroon	2001	8	0
Cameroon	2002	14	1
Cameroon	2003	9	1
Cameroon	2004	10	0
Cameroon	2005	6	3
Cameroon	2006	7	2
Cameroon	2007	5	1
Cameroon	2008	11	2
Cameroon	2009	9	2
Cameroon	2010	10	1
Cameroon	Total	118	13

Scores and results list Cameroon's goal tally first, score column indicates score after each Geremi goal.

List of international goals scored by Geremi
No.	Date	Venue	Opponent	Score	Result	Competition	Ref.
1	26 May 2002	Kobe Wing Stadium, Kobe, Japan	England	2–1	2–2	Friendly	
2	21 June 2003	Stade de France, Paris, France	Turkey	1–0	1–0	2003 FIFA Confederations Cup	
3	9 February 2005	Stade Dominique Duvauchelle, Créteil, France	Senegal	1–0	1–0	Friendly	
4	27 March 2005	Ahmadou Ahidjo Stadium, Yaoundé, Cameroon	Sudan	1–0	2–1	2006 FIFA World Cup qualification	
5	4 June 2005	Stade de l'Amitié, Cotonou, Benin	Benin	3–0	4–1	2006 FIFA World Cup qualification	
6	29 January 2006	Cairo Military Academy Stadium, Cairo, Egypt	DR Congo	1–0	2–0	2006 Africa Cup of Nations	
7	3 September 2006	Amahoro Stadium, Kigali, Rwanda	Rwanda	2–0	3–0	2008 Africa Cup of Nations qualification	
8	17 June 2007	Roumdé Adjia Stadium, Garoua, Cameroon	Rwanda	2–0	2–1	2008 Africa Cup of Nations qualification	
9	26 January 2008	Baba Yara Stadium, Kumasi, Ghana	Zambia	1–0	5–1	2008 Africa Cup of Nations	
10	4 February 2008	Tamale Sports Stadium, Tamale, Ghana	Tunisia	2–0	3–2	2008 Africa Cup of Nations	
11	11 February 2009	Stade Robert Bobin, Bondoufle, France	Guinea	1–0	3–1	Friendly	
12	10 October 2009	Ahmadou Ahidjo Stadium, Yaoundé, Cameroon	Togo	1–0	3–0	2010 FIFA World Cup qualification	
13	17 January 2010	Estádio Nacional da Tundavala, Lubango, Angola	Zambia	1–1	3–2	2010 Africa Cup of Nations	

== Honours ==
Racing Bafoussam

- Cameroonian Cup: 1996

Real Madrid

- La Liga: 2000–01
- UEFA Champions League: 1999–2000, 2001–02

Chelsea

- Premier League: 2004–05, 2005–06
- FA Community Shield: 2005
- FA Cup: 2006-07
- League Cup: 2006-07

Newcastle United

- Football League Championship: 2009–10

Cameroon

- African Cup of Nations: 2000, 2002; runner-up, 2008
- FIFA Confederations Cup: runner up, 2003

Cameroon U-23

- Olympic Gold Medal: 2000

Individual

- Africa Cup of Nations: Team of All Tournaments

== See also ==
- List of men's footballers with 100 or more international caps
