= Riki Kitawaki =

Japanese footballer

Personal information
- Date of birth: November 22, 1985 (age 40)
- Place of birth: Tokyo, Japan
- Height: 1.77 m (5 ft 10 in)
- Position: Midfielder

Youth career
- 2001–2003: Tokyo Verdy
- 2004: Kokushikan University

Senior career*
Years	Team	Apps	(Gls)
2005–2012	Tacuary		
- → 29 de Setiembre (loan)
2007	→Presidente Hayes (loan)		
2012–2013	Júbilo Iwata	0	(0)
2014	Azul Claro Numazu	3	(1)
- * Club domestic league appearances and goals

Riki Kitawaki (北脇 里規, Kitawaki Riki; born November 22, 1985) is a Japanese former professional footballer who played as a midfielder: He was born to a Japanese father and a Venezuelan mother. At the Asociación Paraguaya de Fútbol, Kitawaki played for Tacuary, 29 de Setiembre and Presidente Hayes. Between 2005 and 2012, Kitawaki endured sufficiently to perpetuate in the Asociación Paraguaya de Fútbol as one of few non-CONMEBOL players to do this, and holds the longest participation as an AFC footballer in Paraguayan football.

== See also ==
- List of expatriate footballers in Paraguay
- Players and Records in Paraguayan Football
