= Felippe Ximenes =

Brazilian footballer (born 1976)

Personal information
- Full name: Hernandes Felippe Ximenes
- Date of birth: March 11, 1976 (age 50)
- Place of birth: Rio de Janeiro, Brazil
- Position: Forward

Team information
- Current team: Mesquita Futebol Clube

Senior career*
Years	Team	Apps	(Gls)
1996–1997	Fluminense		
1997–1998	Cerro Porteño		
1998	São Paulo		
1999	Regensburg		
1999–2000	Universidad de Los Andes		
2001	Monagas SC		
2001–2002	Albacete		
2003–2004	FAS		
2005–2006	Aragua FC		
2007–2008	Llaneros de Guanare		
2009–2010	Mesquita Futebol Clube		
- * Club domestic league appearances and goals

Hernandes Felippe Ximenes (born March 11, 1976, in Rio de Janeiro, Brazil) is a Brazilian footballer currently playing for Mesquita Futebol Clube in Brazil Third Division.
