= Zikri Akbar =

Indonesian professional footballer

Personal information
- Full name: Zikri Akbar
- Date of birth: 8 May 1992 (age 34)
- Place of birth: Bireuën, Indonesia
- Height: 1.65 m (5 ft 5 in)
- Position: Left back

Team information
- Current team: Matrix Putra Brother's
- Number: 27

Youth career
- 2008–2011: Escuela Empoli
- 2011–2012: Cerro Porteño

Senior career*
Years	Team	Apps	(Gls)
2012–2013	PSSB Bireuen	19	(0)
2013–2014	Persita Tangerang	16	(1)
2015–2016	Persija Jakarta	13	(0)
2016–2017	Mitra Kukar	31	(0)
2018	Aceh United	10	(0)
2018	Perserang Serang	7	(0)
2019–2021	Persita Tangerang	16	(0)
2021	Persis Solo	0	(0)
2021	→ PSM Makassar (loan)	1	(0)
2021	PSMS Medan	2	(1)
2023–	Matrix Putra Brother's	5	(0)
- * Club domestic league appearances and goals as of 22:56, 13 February 2025 (UTC)

Zikri Akbar (born 8 May 1992) is an Indonesian professional footballer who plays as a left back for Liga 4 club Matrix Putra Brother's. He spent his youth career at Paraguayan Escuela Empoli and then played for Club Cerro Porteño along with fellow Indonesian, Rahmanuddin.

== Club career ==
=== Persita Tangerang ===
He played since 2013 for Persita Tangerang. He scored his first goal in a 2–4 loss against Semen Padang on 7 June 2014.

== Honours ==
Persita Tangerang

- Liga 2 runner-up: 2019
