= Hong Choi =

Korean association football player

Senior career*
Years	Team	Apps	(Gls)
1986	Club Guaraní		
- * Club domestic league appearances and goals

Hong Choi is a former South Korean footballer most notable for being the first South Korean footballer to play in Paraguay, when he joined Club Guaraní in 1986.
