= Rahmanuddin =

Indonesian association footballer

Personal information
- Full name: Rahmanuddin
- Date of birth: 13 March 1993 (age 33)
- Place of birth: Banda Aceh, Indonesia
- Height: 1.86 m (6 ft 1 in)
- Position: Goalkeeper

Youth career
- 2011–2012: Cerro Porteño

Senior career*
Years	Team	Apps	(Gls)
2012–2013	PSSB Bireuen	24	(0)
2014	Semen Padang	1	(0)
2015–2016	Gresik United	1	(0)
2016	Assalam	6	(0)
2017	Persatu Tuban	0	(0)
2017–2018	Persiraja Banda Aceh	28	(0)
2018	Aceh United	7	(0)
2019	Borneo	0	(0)
2020	Persiba Balikpapan	0	(0)
2021	Persita Tangerang	2	(0)
2022	Persiraja Banda Aceh	0	(0)
- * Club domestic league appearances and goals

Rahmanuddin (born 13 March 1993) is an Indonesian professional footballer who plays as a goalkeeper.

== Club career ==
He began his career in 2012 playing for Paraguayan Club Cerro Porteño together with fellow Indonesian Zikri Akbar. Then he played for PSSB Bireuen in Indonesian Premier League and established himself as first choice goalkeeper for the club.

In 2014, he moved to Semen Padang. Beside being back-up goalkeeper for the senior team, he also played for Semen Padang FC U-21, and won the 2014 Indonesia Super League U-21. He played his first game in senior Indonesian Super League for the club in on 29 October 2014, when Semen Padang played a draw 2–2 game with Arema F.C. In 2015, he played for Gresik United, to compete in Liga 1.

He moved to East Timorese Liga Futebol Amadora club Assalam F.C. in 2016, before joining Persiraja Banda Aceh in 2017. In 2018 season, he is considered one of best goalkeeper in Liga 2 by becoming goalkeeper with lowest concedes in the league until fifth week.

== International career ==
Rahmanuddin has not played any international caps. He was selected into Indonesia pre-eliminary squad for 2014 AFF Suzuki Cup, however, he was not chosen for the final squad for the tournament.

== Honour ==
=== Club Honors ===
Semen Padang U-21

- Indonesia Super League U-21: 2014
