= Jefferson Luis =

Brazilian footballer

Personal information
- Full name: Jefferson Luis Teixeira Silva
- Date of birth: November 23, 1994 (age 31)
- Place of birth: Guaíba, Brazil
- Height: 1.82 m (6 ft 0 in)
- Position: Midfielder

Team information
- Current team: Coritiba
- Number: 41

Senior career*
Years	Team	Apps	(Gls)
2003	São Paulo (RS)		
2004	→ Slavia Prague (loan)	3	(0)
2004	Central Español		
2005	São José de Porto Alegre		
2005	Central Español		
2006	Aparecidense		
2006	General Caballero		
2007	São José de Porto Alegre		
2007	→ Criciúma (loan)		
2008	São José de Porto Alegre		
2008	Santa Cruz		
2008	Ivoti		
2009	Rio Preto		
2009–2010	São José de Porto Alegre		
2010–	Coritiba	5	(0)
2011	→ Guarani (loan)	13	(1)
2012	→ Ituano (loan)		
- * Club domestic league appearances and goals

Jefferson Luis Teixeira Silva (born 23 November 1983 in Guaíba) is a Brazilian football player. He was playing for São José de Porto Alegre and signed with Coritiba in April 2010. In January 2011, he moved to Guarani Futebol Clube on loan.

== Football career ==
Jefferson started his professional career at São Paulo (RS). On 30 January 2004, he transferred to Slavia Praha. He then left for Central Español, and returned to Brazil for São José de Porto Alegre on 8 March 2005. He left for Central Español again, and returned to Brazil on 27 January 2006, for Aparecidense. He left for General Caballero in second half of 2006 season, and returned to Brazil for São José de Porto Alegre on 24 January 2007, signed a one-and-a-half-year deal. On 19 September 2007, he was loaned to Criciúma of Série B until end of year.

In the first semester of 2010, Jefferson played the Campeonato Gaúcho for São José, 4th placed in the competition, and he was the best scorer of the whole championship, with 13 goals. Because of this performance, he was contracted by Coritiba to play the Campeonato Brasileiro Série B.
