= Tobie Mimboe =

Cameroonian footballer

Personal information
- Full name: Tobie Bayard Mimboe
- Date of birth: 30 June 1964 (age 62)
- Place of birth: Yaoundé, Cameroon
- Height: 1.74 m (5 ft 9 in)
- Position: Defender

Youth career
- Olympic Mvolyé

Senior career*
Years	Team	Apps	(Gls)
1993–1995	Olympic Mvolyé		
- Deportivo Recoleta
- Atlético Colegiales
- 12 de Octubre
1996	Cerro Porteño	17	(0)
1996–1997	San Lorenzo	7	(0)
1997–1998	Gençlerbirliği	8	(0)
2000–2002	Shenyang Haishi	51	(4)
2002–2003	The Strongest		
2004	Sportivo Luqueño		(1)

International career
1992–1998	Cameroon	42	(0)
- * Club domestic league appearances and goals

Tobie Bayard Mimboe (sometimes referred to as Toby Mimboe), is a Cameroonian former professional footballer who played as a defender and spent most of his career in South America. He was capped for the Cameroon national team, and participated in two African Cup of Nations, in the 1996 African Cup of Nations, and 1998 African Cup of Nations

== Career ==
Mimboe started in Cameroonian team Olympic Mvolyé. In his long career, he played in Paraguay for Deportivo Recoleta, Atlético Colegiales, Sportivo Luqueño, 12 de Octubre and Cerro Porteño, in Turkey for Gençlerbirliği, in Argentina for San Lorenzo, in Bolivia for The Strongest and in China for Shenyang Haishi. He is best remembered for his 'Peter Pan' birth certificates. At the 1996 African Cup of Nations he would have been 31 had he used the same documents that he had used in South America which indicated he was born in 1964. When he joined Gençlerbirliği after that tournament, his documents revealed him to be in his twenties (30 June 1974). At the 1998 African Cup of Nations he gave the date of birth as 30 June 1970.

=== Deportivo Recoleta ===
In 1993, Mimboe joined Deportivo Recoleta, scoring 1 goal in 20 games.

=== Atlético Colegiales ===
In 1994, Mimboe played for Atlético Colegiales, scoring 2 goals in 15 appearances.

=== 12 de Octubre ===
In 1995, he scored 5 goals in 35 appearances for 12 de Octubre.

=== Cerro Porteño ===
In 1996, Mimboe joined Cerro Porteño, for whom he made 17 appearances and won the Paraguay's first-tier Championship. Mimboe joined a squad with players as Virgilio Ferreira, Diego Gavilán, Julio Enciso, Jorge Martín Núñez and Kenyan William Inganga.

=== Deportivo Recoleta ===
In 2002, Mimboe returned to Deportivo Recoleta, making 11 appearances. In July 2002, Mimboe protagonized the closest chance for goal for Deportivo Recoleta as they were defeated 2–0 by Libertad. In August 2002, Recoleta coach Pedro Nelson Fleitas decided to give continuity to Mimboe in the defence zone. In September 2002, passed his position following a muscular injury, after starting in 11 games for Recoleta.

=== Sportivo Luqueño ===
In 2004, Mimboe joined Sportivo Luqueño, playing in 12 games. On 14 March, Mimboe scored for Sportivo Luqueño in a 1–1 home draw against Club Nacional.

== See also ==
- List of expatriate footballers in Paraguay
- Players and Records in Paraguayan Football
