= Rubén Rodríguez (footballer) =

Uruguayan footballer (born 1967)

Personal information
- Full name: Rubén Daniel Rodríguez Hernández
- Date of birth: 26 October 1967 (age 59)
- Place of birth: Montevideo, Uruguay
- Height: 1.83 m (6 ft 0 in)
- Position: Goalkeeper

Youth career
- River Plate

Senior career*
Years	Team	Apps	(Gls)
1986–1988	El Porvenir	2	(0)
1988–1989	Arsenal de Sarandí	0	(0)
1990	Temberaty	0	(0)
1990–1992	Cerrito		
1993–1996	Cerro		
1996–1997	Palestino	2	(0)
1997	Rentistas	11	(0)
1998	Deportivo Unicosta		
1998	Miramar Misiones	9	(0)
1999	San Eugenio		
2000	Guaraní		
2001–2002	Sud América	42	(0)
2003	El Tanque Sisley	19	(0)

International career
1995	Uruguay	1	(0)

Managerial career
- 2004: Atenas (assistant)
- 2007: Bella Vista (assistant)
- 2008: Rentistas (assistant)
- 2009–2010: Boston River (gk coach)
- 2024: Miramar Misiones (gk coach)
- * Club domestic league appearances and goals

Rubén Daniel Rodríguez Hernández (born 19 April 1967 in Montevideo) is a former Uruguayan footballer who played as a goalkeeper.

== Club career ==
Born in Uruguay, Rodríguez moved to Argentina at early age and was with River Plate at youth level. He started his senior career with El Porvenir and Arsenal de Sarandí in Argentina and Tembetary in Paraguay.

Besides Argentina, Rodríguez played for clubs in Argentina, Chile, Colombia and Paraguay. For Chilean club Palestino, Rodríguez made two appearances in 1997.

== International career ==
Rodríguez made one appearance for the senior Uruguay national football team in 1995: on March 22, 1995, in a friendly match against Colombia (2–1 loss) in the Estadio Atanasio Girardot in Medellín. There he saved a 43rd minute penalty kick from Víctor Aristizábal.

== Coaching career ==
As a football coach, he worked as an assistant for clubs in Uruguay. He has also worked as goalkeeping coach for clubs such as Boston River and Miramar Misiones.
