= Cyrille Florent Bella =

Cameroonian footballer (born 1975)

Personal information
- Date of birth: 11 June 1975 (age 51)
- Place of birth: Yaoundé, Cameroon
- Height: 1.91 m (6 ft 3 in)
- Position: Forward

Senior career*
Years	Team	Apps	(Gls)
1995–1997	Union Douala		
1997–1998	Cerro Porteño		
1998–2000	SC Paderborn		
2000–2004	LR Ahlen	131	(37)
2005–2006	Rot-Weiß Oberhausen	6	(1)
2006–2007	SV Wilhelmshaven	18	(0)
2008	Hammer SpVg	13	(7)
2008	Kitchee	4	(0)

International career
1995–2003	Cameroon	4	(0)
- * Club domestic league appearances and goals

Cyrille Florent Bella (born 11 June 1975) is a Cameroonian former professional footballer who played as a forward.

== Personal life ==
Bella's son Armel Bella-Kotchap is also a professional footballer. He represents Germany at international level.
