= Santa Rita District, Paraguay =

District of Paraguay

Coordinates: 25°59′S 54°57′W

Santa Rita District
- District
- Interactive map of Santa Rita District
- Country: Paraguay
- Department: Alto Paraná

Area
  - Land: 593.3 km^{2} (229.1 sq mi)

Population (2022)
  - Total: 27,249
  - Density: 45.93/km^{2} (119.0/sq mi)

Santa Rita is a district of the Alto Paraná Department, Paraguay. It occupies an area of 593.3 km^{2} (229.1 sq mi). As per the 2022 census, it had a population of 27,249 individuals. It was established by Law 58/90 effective on 16 March 1990.

== History ==
The settlement of Santa Rita was initially founded in 1973 by immigrants from the southern region of Brazil. It was earlier part of Domingo Martínez de Irala district, and was elevated as a district by the Law 58/90 enacted on 16 January 1990. The city experienced rapid population growth due to further immigration and economic development thanks to the fertile agricultural lands and it is known as the "Capital of Progress".

== Geography ==
Santa Rita is a district located in the Alto Paraná Department in Paraguay. It occupies an area of 593.3 km^{2} (229.1 sq mi). It is located in the southern part of the department and is surrounded by other municipalities with high agricultural production, such as Santa Rosa del Monday, Iruña, Naranjal, San Cristobal, and Tavapy.

It is located at an elevation of 121.5 m (399 ft) above sea level. The district has a tropical savanna climate (Köppen climate classification: Aw). The average annual temperature is 28.34 °C (83.01 °F). The district receives an average annual rainfall of 10.24 cm (4.03 in) and has 137.19 rainy days in a year.

== Demographics ==
As per the 2022 census, Santa Rita district had a population of 27,249 inhabitants of which 13,609 were males and 13,640 were females. About 31.8% of the population was classified rural, and the rest (68.2%) lived in urban areas. About 25.7% of the population was below the age of fourteen, and 4.2% was more than 65 years of age.

== Economy ==
The economy was predominantly dependent on agriculture, mainly soybean, wheat, maize, sunflower, and canola. Other economic activities and industries developed around the same. The Santa Rita Expo, held annually, is the second largest agribusiness exhibition in Paraguay.
