= Iruña, Paraguay =

Iruña
- District
- Location within Paraguay
- Coordinates: 26°5′54″S 55°2′51″W
- Country: Paraguay
- Department: Alto Paraná
- Foundation: 1993

Government
  - Intendente municipal: Justo César Gamarra

Area
  - Total: 531 km^{2} (205 sq mi)
- Elevation: 290 m (950 ft)

Population (2017)
  - Total: 6,161
- Time zone: -4 Gmt
- Postal code: 7700
- Area code: (595) (676)
- Climate: Cfa

Iruña is a district located in the Alto Paraná Department of Paraguay. Previously it was part of the district of Ñacunday, and it was created as a district in 1993. It is located about 112 km (70 mi) from the departmental capital Ciudad del Este and 379 km (235 mi) from Asunción. The commercial activity of the area is agriculture.
