= Doctor Raúl Peña =

- District
- Location within Paraguay
- Coordinates: 26°9′0″S 55°16′0″W
- Country: Paraguay
- Department: Alto Paraná
- Foundation: September 11, 2012

Government
  - Intendente municipal: Gustavo Javier Cano Barrios

Area
  - Total: 225 km^{2} (87 sq mi)

Population (2017)
  - Total: 9,053
- Time zone: -4 Gmt
- Postal code: 7570
- Area code: (595) (672)
- Climate: Cfa

Doctor Raúl Peña is a district located in the Alto Paraná Department of Paraguay. It was previously part of the Naranjal District and it was created as a district on September 11, 2012.
