= San Alberto District =

Coordinates: 24.96667°S 54.9°W

- District
- Interactive map of San Alberto District
- Country: Paraguay
- Department: Alto Paraná

Area
  - Total: 1,025 km^{2} (396 sq mi)

Population (2022)
  - Total: 11,162
  - Density: 10.89/km^{2} (28.20/sq mi)

San Alberto is a district of the Alto Paraná Department, Paraguay. It occupies an area of 1,025 km^{2} (396 sq mi). As per the 2022 census, it had a population of 11,162 individuals.

== Geography ==
San Alberto is a district located in the Alto Paraná Department in Paraguay. It occupies an area of 1,025 km^{2} (396 sq mi). It is located about 70 km (43 mi) from Ciudad del Este, and 411 km (255 mi) from the Paraguayan capital of Asunción.

It is located at an elevation of 345.27 m (1,132.8 ft) above sea level. The district has a tropical savanna climate (Köppen climate classification: Aw). The average annual temperature is 25.61 °C (78.10 °F). The district receives an average annual rainfall of 21.39 cm (8.42 in) and has 173.26 rainy days in a year.

== Demographics ==
As per the 2022 census, Minga Porã district had a population of 11,162 inhabitants of which 5,621 were males and 5,541 were females. About 36% of the population was classified rural, and the rest (64%) lived in urban areas. About 24.5% of the population was below the age of fourteen, and 5.4% was more than 65 years of age. The patron saint festival is celebrated on 15 November annually.

== Economy ==
San Alberto is known the "Agricultural Capital" of Paraguay. The district's economy is predominantly dependent on agriculture, particularly large-scale soybean production. Most of the cultivable land is dedicated to soybean cultivation with wheat and oilseed cultivated on rotational basis. Farming drives all related local economic activity in the district. Agricultural expansion has made San Alberto one of the fastest-growing districts in the region, and it attracts workers from nearby municipalities and districts.
