= Minga Porá District =

Coordinates: 24°52′S 54°55′W

Minga Pora District
- District
- Interactive map of Minga Pora District
- Country: Paraguay
- Department: Alto Paraná

Area
  - Land: 881 km^{2} (340 sq mi)

Population (2022)
  - Total: 11,959
  - Density: 13.6/km^{2} (35.2/sq mi)

Minga Porá is a district of the Alto Paraná Department, Paraguay. It occupies an area of 881 km^{2} (340 sq mi). As per the 2022 census, it had a population of 11,959 individuals. It was officially established on 4 January 1991.

== History ==
The settlement was formed as Malvina Cue when about 27 families arrived at the location on 13 May 1983, and established a settlement, which was named Minga Porã. The people erected a chapel for Virgen de Fatima, who is the patron saint of the city.

Minga Porã was upgraded to the district by the Law 116/90 enacted on 4 January 1991. It was split from the Hernandarias and Itakyry districts.The foundation date is celebrated annually along with the commemorative festival for the patron saint.

== Geography ==
Minga Porã is a district located in the Alto Paraná Department in Paraguay. It occupies an area of 881 km^{2} (340 sq mi). It is located about 90 km (56 mi) from Ciudad del Este, and 413 km (257 mi) from the Paraguayan capital of Asunción.

It is located at an elevation of 213.54 m (700.6 ft) above sea level. The district has a tropical savanna climate (Köppen climate classification: Aw). The average annual temperature is 24.38 °C (75.88 °F). The district receives an average annual rainfall of 20.365 cm (8.018 in) and has 164.97 rainy days in a year.

== Demographics ==
As per the 2022 census, Minga Porã district had a population of 23,548 inhabitants of which 6,178 were males and 5,781 were females. About 78.1% of the population was classified rural, and the rest (21.9%) lived in urban areas. About 30.6% of the population was below the age of fourteen, and 5.1% was more than 65 years of age.
