= Moisés Bertoni Scientific Monument =

Paraguayan protected natural area

Coordinates: 25.66°S 54.59°W

The Moisés Bertoni Scientific Monument is a protected natural area, museum, and historic site in Presidente Franco District, Alto Paraná Department, Paraguay. Established on 13 April 1955, the site covers 199 hectares (about 492 acres) and lies approximately 26 kilometres (16 miles) from the city of Presidente Franco.

The monument preserves the former residence and research site of Moisés Santiago Bertoni, a Swiss-born naturalist who lived and worked in Paraguay from the late 19th century until his death in 1929. Bertoni conducted research in botany, anthropology, meteorology, and related fields, much of it in collaboration with Guaraní communities. The site now functions as a museum and conservation area, holding historical buildings, archival materials, and a section of protected Atlantic Forest along the Paraná River.

== Moisés Bertoni ==
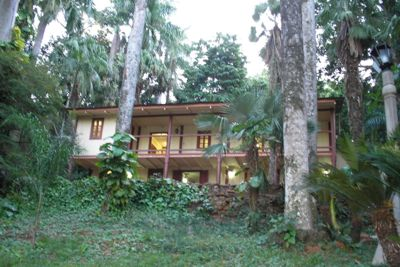
Bertoni's house

Moisés Bertoni was an idealist and botanist who moved his family from Europe to Paraguay in 1894 to implement their anarchist ideals. Throughout his lifetime, Bertoni investigated the culture of the Guaraní.

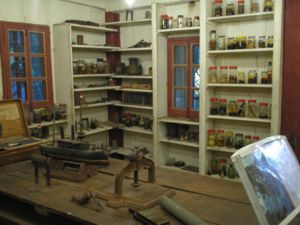
Bertoni's laboratory

While living at the site, Bertoni conducted research in botany, zoology, meteorology, and anthropology. Bertoni studied and classified plants with the assistance of members of the Guaraní community, from whom he learned about the medicinal uses of local herbs. Bertoni’s house also served as his laboratory, library, and office for writing his scientific papers—most of which were never publicly published. All the papers written had the emblem 'Ex silvis' (from the jungle). Bertoni penned rain predictions that were used by Paraguayan, Brazilian, and Argentine farmers for decades after his death. The museum contains Bertoni's personal objects, manuscripts, books, and letters.

== The monument ==
The site covers 199 hectares (about 492 acres) of protected wilderness and has been legally safeguarded since 1955. The area is inhabited only by members of the Mbya Indigenous community and a small number of park rangers.

A cemetery containing the graves of members of the Bertoni family is located a few metres from the house. Several descendants were buried there until burials were later prohibited.

In 2024, Paraguayan authorities arrested 26 people on suspicion of illegal deforestation following monitoring activities within the reserve.

== Flora and fauna ==
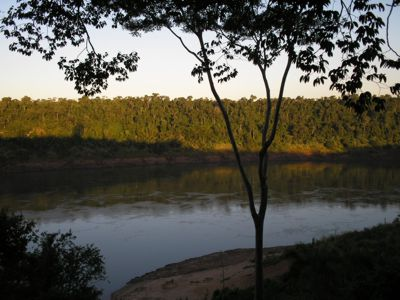
The view of the Paraná River from Bertoni's house

The protected area includes a remnant of the Atlantic Forest and borders the Paraná River. Species recorded in the reserve include Euterpe edulis (palm), Araucaria angustifolia (kuriʼu), tree ferns, and Dryocopus galeatus (helmeted woodpecker), among other species considered regionally threatened or vulnerable.

Some sources estimate that approximately 60 percent of the plant species present were introduced during Bertoni’s lifetime. These introduced species are reported to occur primarily within the reserve and are not native to the surrounding Paraná region.

== Location ==
The area is surrounded by a variety of natural boundaries. To the north lies the river Monday, in the east lies the Paraná River, to the south lies the stream Itá Coty, and to the west lies the route connecting Presidente Franco to Los Cedrales.

== Tourism ==
The Puerto Bertoni, as Paraguayans call it, is a tourist site with a scenic location on the banks of the Paraná River.

Brazilian and Argentine companies offer tourist visits that include boat rides. The indigenous Mbya people often perform a tribal dance at dusk and offer visitors handicrafts.

== Weather ==
The average annual temperature is 21 °C, with a high of 38 °C and a low of 0 °C. The Alto Paraná region records the highest rainfall in Paraguay.

== Indigenous population ==
The monument lies within the territory of the Mbya indigenous group. Three villages populated by indigenous people are located on the property.

== See also ==
- Moises Bertoni Foundation
