= Luis Vargas Zorrilla =

Paraguayan footballer

Luis Vargas
Personal information
- Full name: Luis Abelardo Vargas Zorrilla
- Date of birth: 2000 (age 25–26)
- Place of birth: Santa Rita, Paraguay
- Height: 1.75 m (5 ft 9 in)
- Position: Left-back

Team information
- Current team: Club Cerro Porteño
- Number: 31

Youth career
- –2019: Club Cerro Porteño

Senior career*
Years	Team	Apps	(Gls)
2019–2024	Club Cerro Porteño	27	(0)
- * Club domestic league appearances and goals as of 14 February 2025

Luis Abelardo Vargas Zorrilla (born June 25, 2000, in Santa Rita, Paraguay) is a Paraguayan footballer who plays as a defender for Club Cerro Porteño in the Paraguayan Primera División.

== Career ==
Luis Vargas developed in the youth divisions of Club Cerro Porteño. He made his Paraguayan Primera División debut on May 1, 2019, in a match against Sportivo San Lorenzo.

In November 2022, during a reserve category match against General Caballero de Juan León Mallorquín, he suffered an anterior cruciate ligament (ACL) tear in his knee, which kept him off the field for approximately eight months. He returned to play in July 2023, gaining minutes in the reserve category.

On December 5, 2023, he suffered the same injury again during a training session. As a result, he was ruled out of the 2024 season.

In 2025, Vargas suffered another anterior cruciate ligament and meniscus tear in his knee.

== Statistics ==
=== Clubs ===
Season	Team	League	Matches	Goals	Domestic cups	Matches	Goals	International cups	Matches	Goals	Total	Matches	Goals
2019	Club Cerro Porteño	PD	1	0	CP	—	—	CL	0	0	1	0	
2020	Club Cerro Porteño	PD	12	0	CP	—	—	CL	1	0	13	0	
2021	Club Cerro Porteño	PD	8	0	CP	—	—	CL	2	0	10	0	
2022	Club Cerro Porteño	PD	6	0	CP	—	—	CL	0	0	0	0	
Career total			27	0		—	—		3	0	24	0	0
