= Naranjal District =

Coordinates: 25°58′S 55°11′W

Naranjal (Guarani: Narãndy) is a district of the Alto Paraná Department, Paraguay. Spread over an area of 627.4 km^{2} (242.2 sq mi), it had a population of 6,608 inhabitants as per the 2022 census. It was officially founded on 26 July 1990. It is known for its "Fiesta de la Costilla" (rib festival) celebrated in May annually.

== History ==
Naranje district was carved out of the districts of Domingo Martínez de Irala and Ñacunday on 26 July 1990. It was also declared as a municipality on the same day, and the first mayor was Don Faustino Leiva Azuaga.

== Geography ==
Naranjal is a district located in the southwestern part of the Alto Paraná Department in Paraguay. It is located about 363 km (226 mi) from the national capital of Asunción.

== Demographics and culture ==
As per the 2022 census, Naranje had a population of 6,608 inhabitants of which 3,409 were males and 3,199 were females. About 58.2% of the population was classified rural, and the rest (41.8%) lived in urban areas. About 25.7% of the population was below the age of fourteen, and 5.6% was more than 65 years of age. The population is multi-ethnic, with significant proportion formed by immigrants from Brazil.

Due to its significant population of Brazilian immigrants, there is Brazilian influence on the local culture and language. The town is known for its Fiesta de la Costilla (rib festival) held in July annually. During the festival, nearly 4,500 kg (9,900 lb) are ribs are cooked for over 12 hours, and thousands of people gather to eat them.

== Economy ==
The primary economic activity is agriculture, with majority of the people employed in small farms. Major agriculture produce include soyabean, wheat, and maize.
