= Tavapy =

- District
- Location within Paraguay
- Coordinates: 25°39′45″S 54°59′35″W
- Country: Paraguay
- Department: Alto Paraná
- Foundation: May 26, 2011

Government
  - Intendente municipal: Aníbal Fidabel Romero

Area
  - Total: 436 km^{2} (168 sq mi)
- Elevation: 264 m (866 ft)

Population (2017)
  - Total: 8,287
- Time zone: -4 Gmt
- Postal code: 7530
- Area code: (595) (678)
- Climate: Cfa

Tavapy is a district located in the Alto Paraná Department of Paraguay. It was previously part of Santa Rosa del Monday and it was created as a district on May 26, 2011.
