= Los Cedrales District =

Coordinates: 25°38′59″S 54°42′0″W

- district
- Interactive map of Los Cedrales District
- Country: Paraguay
- Department: Alto Paraná

Area
  - Water: 403.1 km^{2} (155.6 sq mi)

Population (2022)
  - Total: 7,258

Los Cedrales is a district of the Alto Paraná Department, Paraguay. It occupies an area of 881 km^{2} (340 sq mi). As per the 2022 census, it had a population of 11,959 individuals. It was officially established on 16 January 1990.

== History ==
Los Cedrales was established officially as a district by the Law 60/89 enacted on 16 January 1990. It was carved out of the districts of Presidente Franco and Domingo Martínez de Irala.

== Geography ==
Los Cedrales is a district located in the Alto Paraná Department in Paraguay. It occupies an area of 403.1 km^{2} (155.6 sq mi). It is separated from the Presidente Franco and Minga Pora districts to the north by the Monday and Cedroty rivers, and Domingo Martínez de Irala to the south by the Ytuti river, a tributary of the Paraná River.

Los Cedrales is located at an elevation of 221.66 m (727.2 ft) above sea level. The district has a tropical savanna climate (Köppen climate classification: Aw). The average annual temperature is 23.73 °C (74.71 °F). The district receives an average annual rainfall of 19.82 cm (7.80 in) and has 160.58 rainy days in a year.

== Demographics ==
As per the 2022 census, Los Cedrales had a population of 7,258 inhabitants of which 3,769 were males and 3,489 were females. About 58.2% of the population was classified rural, and the rest (41.8%) lived in urban areas. About 26.7% of the population was below the age of fourteen, and 7.7% was more than 65 years of age.

== Culture and economy ==
The economy is mainly dependent on agriculture. Major agricultural produce includes soybean, maize, wheat, and sunflower.

The patron saint is Virgin Aparecida, who has a chapel dedicated to her. The Los Cedrales historical museum was opened in 2017, and preserves various artifacts related to its history.
