= Ciudad del Este District =

- district
- Country: Paraguay
- Department: Alto Paraná Department

Ciudad del Este is a district of the Alto Paraná Department, Paraguay. The capital is Ciudad del Este.

Along with Asunción, it is the only district in Paraguay with 100% urban population.
