= Santa Fe del Paraná =

- District
- Location within Paraguay
- Coordinates: 25°13′30″S 54°42′0″W
- Country: Paraguay
- Department: Alto Paraná
- Foundation: 11 July 2003

Area
  - Total: 771 km^{2} (298 sq mi)

Population (2017)
  - Total: 4,404
- Time zone: -4 Gmt
- Postal code: 7700
- Area code: (595) (677)
- Climate: Cfa

Santa Fe del Paraná is a district located in the Alto Paraná Department of Paraguay.
