= Itakyry =

- Location within Paraguay
- Coordinates: 24°59′7″S 55°8′59″W
- Country: Paraguay
- Department: Alto Paraná

Population (2008)
  - Total: 3 433
- Climate: Cfa

Itakyry is the main town in Itakyry District in the Alto Paraná Department of Paraguay. It is around 75 km northwest of Ciudad del Este (100 km by road), and around 240 km east of Asunción (325 km by road).

== Sources ==
- World Gazeteer: Paraguay – World-Gazetteer.com
