= Alto Paraná Department =

Department of Paraguay

Alto Paraná Department Departamento de Alto Paraná (Spanish) Tetãvore Alto Parana (Guarani)
- Department
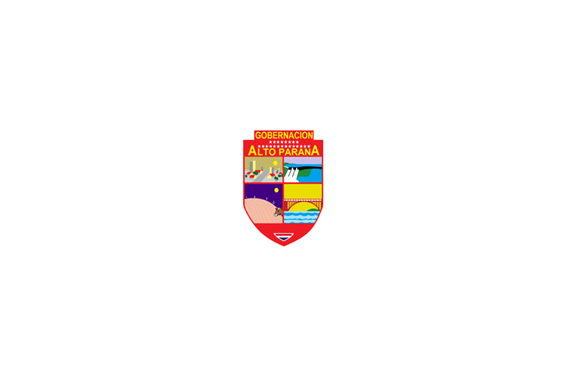
- Flag

- Alto Paraná shown in red
- Coordinates: 25°25′S 54°38′W
- Country: Paraguay
- Region: Eastern Region
- Established: 1945
- Capital: Ciudad del Este
- Largest city: Ciudad del Este

Government
  - Governor: César Landy Torres (ANR)

Area
  - Total: 14,895 km^{2} (5,751 sq mi)
  - Rank: 7

Population (2022 census)
  - Total: 763,702
  - Rank: 2
  - Density: 51.272/km^{2} (132.79/sq mi)
- Time zone: UTC-03 (PYT)
- ISO 3166 code: PY-10
- Number of Districts: 19
- Website: altoparana.gov.py

Alto Paraná (Spanish pronunciation: [ˈalto paɾaˈna]; Upper Paraná) is a department in Paraguay. The capital is Ciudad del Este (formerly known as Puerto Presidente Stroessner, originally Puerto Flor de Lis).

The Alto Paraná department has experienced tremendous economic and population growth in the past 50 years. Most of this growth has been concentrated in the department capital of Ciudad del Este, and mainly occurred after the construction of the Puente de la Amistad bridge in 1961, which connects Paraguay and Brazil. This department is home to the Itaipu power plant, which supplies 95% of the energy consumed by Paraguay, and the Acaray Dam. Several ecological reserves, a zoo and the Taiwanese-Paraguayan Technology Park are situated in this department.

The city of Presidente Franco was the first city founded in this department. Several important agricultural establishments are centered in the region of Minga Guazú which is home of the Guarani International Airport.

== History ==
In colonial times, there were several settlements established in this area. The most important of these settlements were Ontiveros, Ciudad Real, and Villa Rica del Espíritu Santo. Nevertheless, these villages did not initially prosper due to the constant attacks of the Bandeirantes.

By the end of the 17th century and beginnings of the 18th century, many populations settled in this area due to the promising logging economy. These urban centers organized around military bases that served to defend them against the attacks of the Bandeirantes. Some of these cities exist into the present day, such as: Villa Curuguaty, Ygatimi, Caaguazú, Lima and Ajos.

After the War against the Triple Alliance, these lands were sold, creating large states in which the most important economic activities were the exploitation of the local forests and the cultivation of yerba mate. During the War Against the Triple Alliance many of the men of Paraguay died, and to make up for population loss, European/Middle Eastern and East Asian men immigrated to the nation. In this region, many descendants of Poles, Ukrainians, and Japanese people are found demographically similar to the neighboring Brazilian state of Paraná. There was also settlement of Brazilian from the South of Brazil, most of the people were white Brazilians of Italian, Portuguese, Spanish, German, Eastern European, Arabic blood. And Also Japanese Brazilians and Brazilians of mixed race.

By the end of the 19th century, it was a very active port known as Tacurú Pucú, which means "high termite mound". This port was used for the transport of lumber, through the Paraná River, to Encarnación, and from Encarnación to facilitate the trade of food and textiles. After the TRI

The department, as it is today, was created in 1945.

In 1990, the department's structure was officially established.

== Geography ==
=== Location ===
This department is located in the Oriental Region of Paraguay, between parallels 24° 30′ and 26° 15′ of latitude south and between the meridians 54° 20′ and 55° 20′ of longitude west.

It is located in the Center East of Oriental Region. It is bordered by:

- To the North: with Canindeyú Department
- To the South: with Itapúa Department
- To the East: with Brazil and Argentina
- To the West: with Caaguazú and Caazapá departments

The capital is Ciudad del Este, originally named Puerto Flor de Lis, and later Puerto Presidente Stroessner until it was renamed once more following the end of the dictatorial government of General Alfredo Stroessner. It is within the limits of the Brazilian city, Foz do Iguaçu.

=== Districts ===
The department is divided into 22 districts:

Districts	Population (2022)
1 Ciudad del Este	325,819
2 Doctor Juan León Mallorquín	16,144
3 Domingo Martínez de Irala	5,035
4 Hernandarias	83,285
5 Iruña	3,943
6 Itakyry	27,340
7 Juan Emilio O'Leary	16,092
8 Los Cedrales	7,258
9 Mbaracayú	6,406
10 Minga Guazú	81,072
11 Minga Porá	11,959
12 Naranjal	6,608
13 Ñacunday	6,468
14 Presidente Franco	88,744
15 San Alberto	11,162
16 San Cristóbal	8,563
17 Santa Fe del Paraná	3,981
18 Santa Rita	27,249
19 Santa Rosa del Monday	5,923
20 Yguazú	8,131
Doctor Raúl Peña^{*}	5,617
Tavapy^{*}	6,903

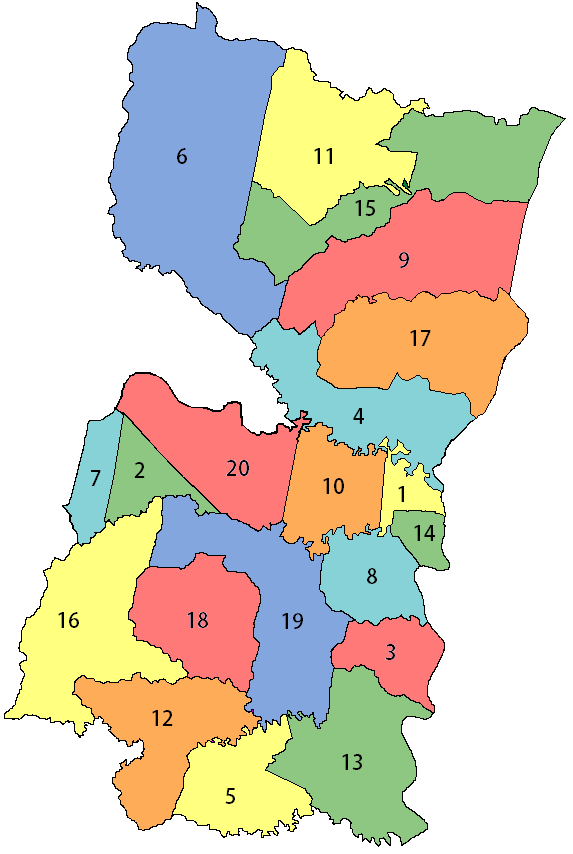

^{*} The districts of Doctor Raúl Peña and Tavapy were created after the 2002 Census, and therefore not displayed on the map.

Alto Paraná has a combination of valleys and streams that come from the Paraná River. It also has mountainous areas of high elevation that can reach 300 meters above sea level.

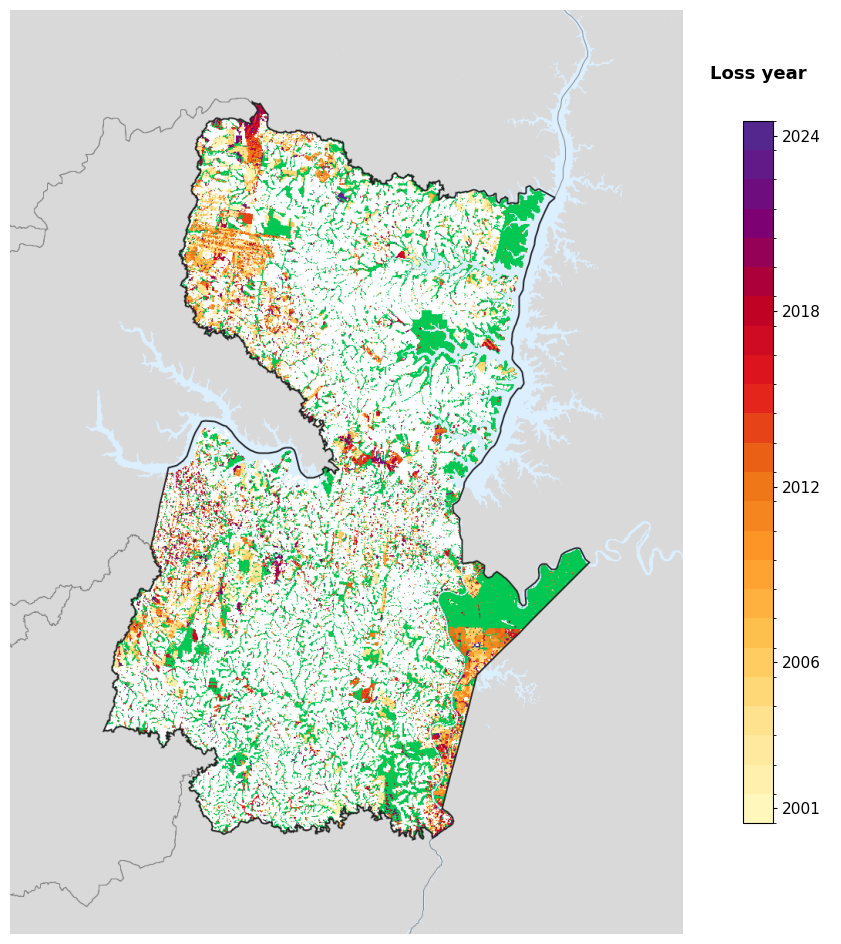
Tree-cover loss year in Alto Paraná, 2001-2024, from the Global Forest Change dataset.

The lands near the banks of the Paraná River have forests, which are threatened in the present by indiscriminate deforestation. There are local efforts to combat this through the introduction of reforestation programs, with managed planting of different species of pine.

=== Hydrography ===
The Paraná River is the most important supply of water for the department. The following are branches of this river:

- Itambey
- Ñacunday
- Limoy
- Itabo Guazú
- Pira Pyta
- Ycua Guazú
- Acaray
- Monday
- Yacuy

In this area, there are also several streams that help make the land fertile for agriculture.

These streams and rivers part due to the presence of large rocks that give origin to local waterfalls. Among these are the ones formed by the Monday and Ñacunday Rivers.

The flow of the rivers Paraná and Acaray has been used in favor of constructing the hydroelectric power stations in Itaipú and Acaray.

=== Climate ===
Alto Paraná presents an absolute maximum temperature in summer of 38 °C or 100.4 °F. The absolute minimum in winter is 0 °C or 32 °F. The annual average is 21 °C or 69.8 °F.

The department receives abundant precipitation during the entire year, registered as 1,725 millimetres or 68 inches annually. This total is the highest anywhere in Paraguay. Consequently, this area has a lot of humidity in the environment, which is good for agriculture.

Fog and light rains are the norm in wintertime.

== Economy ==
The logging industry remains to be the most important activity in the area. Nowadays, the population is also involved in the industrial process of different varieties of wood, such as: cedar, yvyra pyta, lapacho, taperyva guasu, petereby, guatambu, incense, guaica and others. Another important activity is the plantation of pine as a form of reforestation. There's also the clearing of palm hearts.

About 700,000 hectares of land are utilized for agriculture. Soy, maize, wheat, mint, cotton, sugarcane, tangerine, sweet orange, tomato, manioc, sweet potato, rice, potato, carrot, strawberry, sunflower, pea and ka’a he’e (a sweetener and medical plant) are cultivated here.

In this department cows, pigs, cebú, and nelore are raised by ranchers. This industry occupies a place of growing importance. There are factories of oil, food, sausages, sawmills, rice and yerba mills, of ceramic products, and also dairy products.

== Education ==
Alto Paraná has institutions that impart initial, elementary and secondary education. Also there are institutions working to impart education to the natives of the area. There are private universities and the national university.

== Communication ==
The most important ways of access to the department are Route No. 7 "Dr. Gaspar Rodríguez de Francia", that crosses the department from east to west and connects with Asunción, and also the Route No. 6 "Juan León Mallorquín" that joins Encarnación with the southern region of the country. There is a route that connects Salto del Guairá to the north.

An international bridge over the Paraná River connects Paraguay with Brazil.

The "Guaraní International Airport", in the Minga Guazú district, offers regular flights to Asunción, São Paulo, and connections with other flights.

The department has televisions stations. It has an automatic phone center, and mobile phone communication services. There are also several radio stations.

AM: Radio Parque, Itapiru, Magnificat, America, Concierto, La voz de Hernandarias, Cedro Ty, Corpus and Minga Guazú.

FM: Guarani, Progreso, Integración, Ciudad del Este, Virtual, Educacción, Yguazú, Naranjal, Transparaná, Pionera, Transcontinental, Santa Rita, Pentagrama and El Portal de Itapúa.

== Tourism ==
This department offers a very rich and attractive natural environment, specially represented by the Acaray and Paraná Rivers.

The following places are recommended to visit:

- Tati Yupi Refuge
- Itabó Natural Reserve
- Limoy Natural Reserve
- Ñacunday National Park
- Pikyry Refuge
- Carapá Refuge
- The mouth of Itambey River
- Minga Guazú Ecology Park
- Mbaracayú Refuge

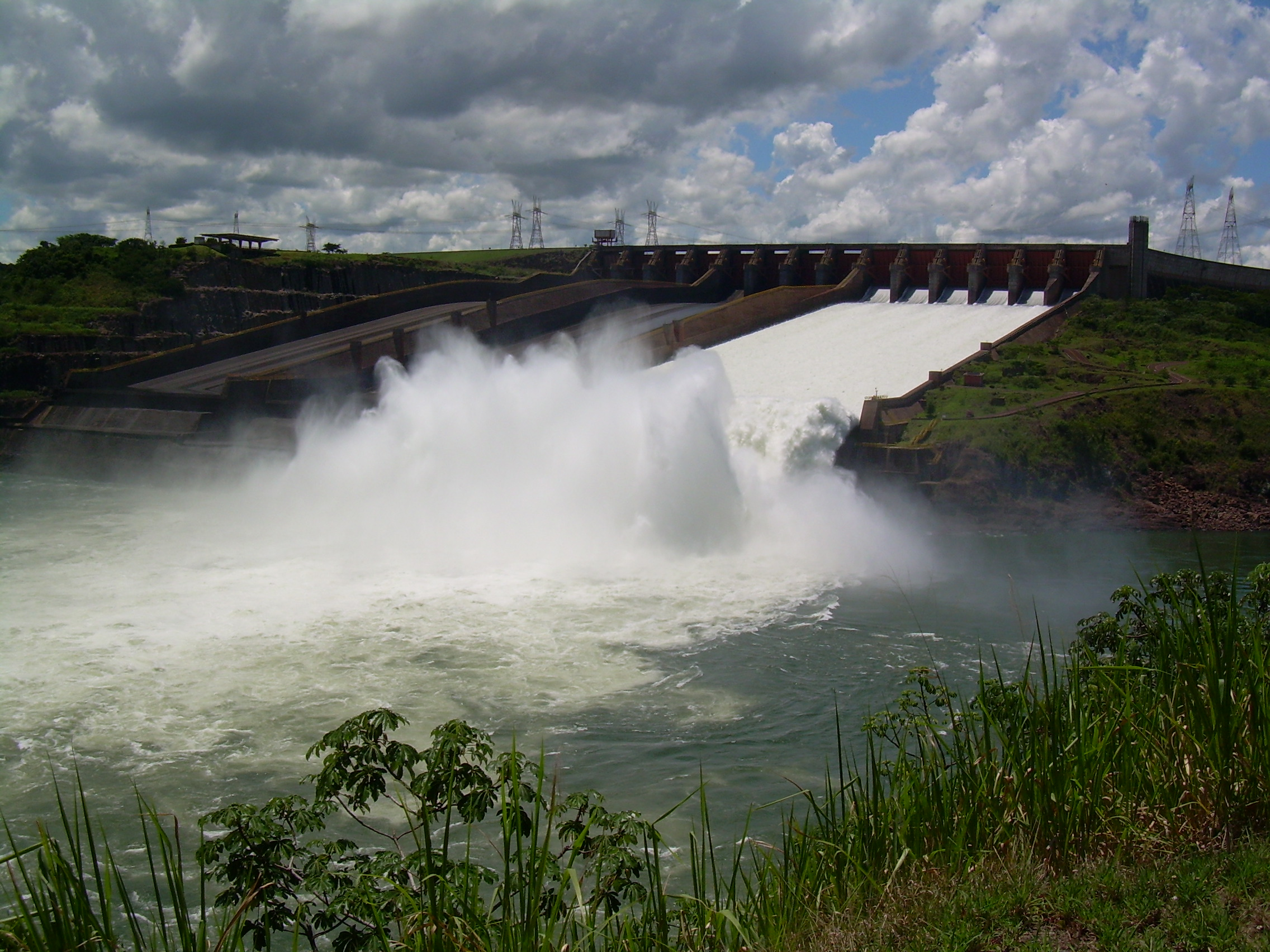
Itaipú Hydroelectric Dam

Other touristic places are the modern engineering constructions that produce great admiration in the visitors, those are: the Amistad's Bridge, that communicates Paraguay and Brazil, the hydroelectric stations Itaipu Binacional and Acaray.

In Ciudad del Este there are the Park and Lake of the Republic, an artificial lake formed by the waters of the Amambay stream, the park serves as lung for the city. This space was created with the collaboration of every city council of the country.

Alto Paraná has several museums that exhibit artifacts of great scientific and cultural value, such as:

- The House of Culture in Ciudad del Este
- El Mensú Hydric Museum
- Museum of Natural History
- Itaipú Natural and Anthropology Museum

The Museum Moisés Bertoni was declared Natural and Scientific Monument. This place is a port, where Moisés Bertoni accomplished to compile a great variety of plants from the entire world and who dedicated his life to the preservation of the nature.
