= Ñacunday =

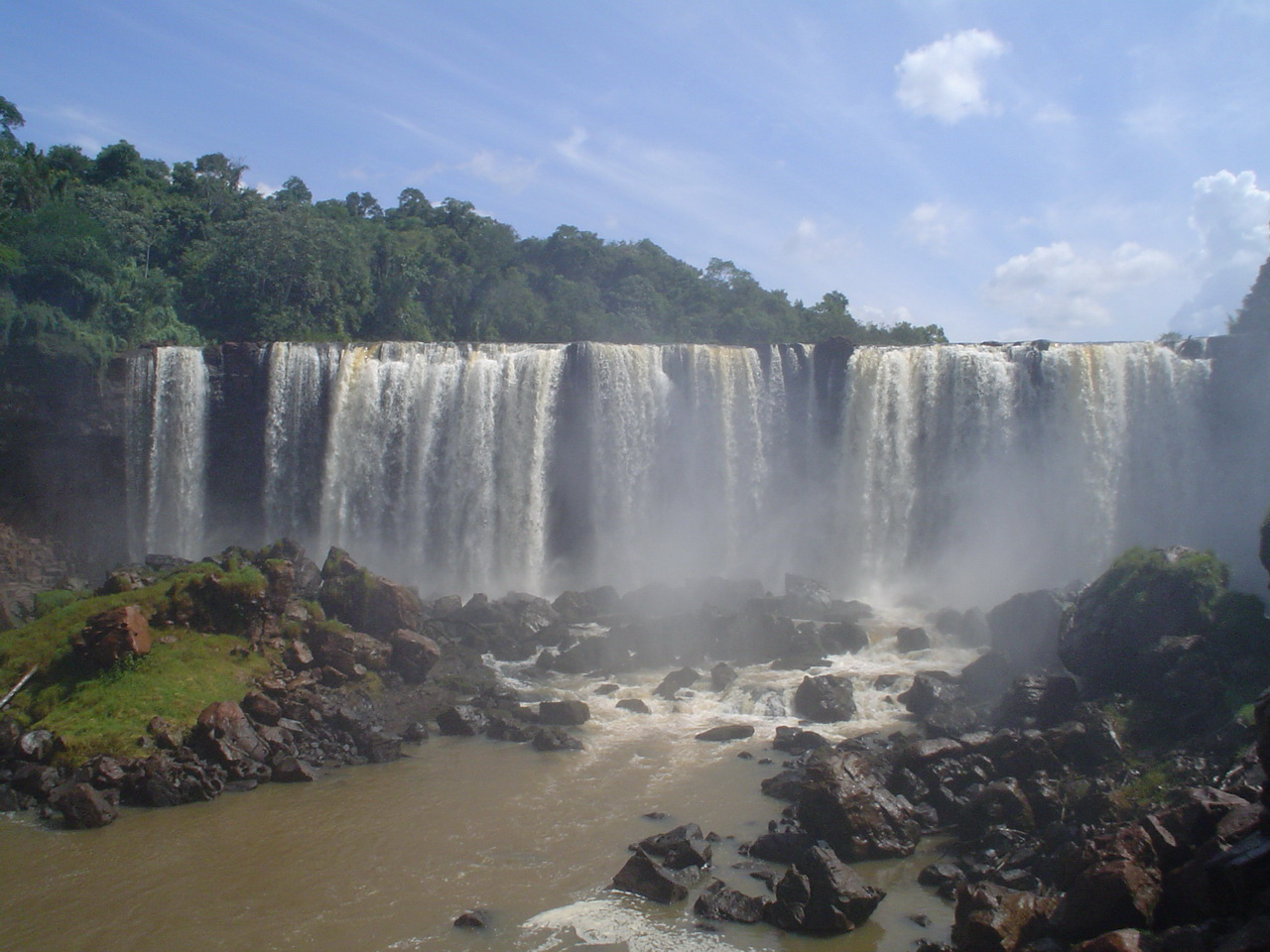
- Salto Ñacunday waterfall

- Location within Paraguay
- Coordinates: 26°1′12″S 54°46′12″W
- Country: Paraguay
- Department: Alto Paraná

Population (2022)
  - Total: 6,468
- Climate: Cfa

Ñacunday is a district and town in the Alto Paraná department of Paraguay. It was officially founded on 7 December 1973. The Ñacunday National Park is located in the district, which hosts the 43 m (141 ft) tall Salto Ñacunday waterfall.

== History ==
The municipality was formerly known as Puerto Paranambú and was officially created on 7 December 1973 by Law No. 426. The district was created by Law No. 1097 of 20 December 1984, which formally established its boundaries and incorporated it as a third-category municipality.

== Geography ==
Nacunday is a district located in the Alto Paraná Department in Paraguay. It is located about 65 km (40 mi) south of the city of Ciudad del Este. It is known as the "Waterfall Capital" due to the presence of several waterfalls in the region, the prominent of which is the Salto Ñacunday, which is 43 m (141 ft) high and 70 m (230 ft) wide. Most of the waterfalls are formed by the Ñacunday and Yacu’i Guasu rivers, both of which are tributaries of the Paraná River. The Ñacunday National Park, located in the district, was established in 1973.

== Demographics ==
As per the 2022 census, Nacunday had a population of 6,468 inhabitants of which 3,394 were males and 3,074 were females. About 85.4% of the population was classified rural, and the rest (14.6%) lived in urban areas. About 32.3% of the population was below the age of fourteen, and 6.5% was more than 65 years of age.

== Economy ==
The economy of the district is mainly dependent on agriculture. Major agricultural produce include soybean, wheat, maize and fruits including orange, grapefruit, and peach. There are also plantations cultivating peppermint, cassava, and potato. Cattle rearing and the associated dairy industry is also present in the region. The district also attracts tourists due to the presence of several waterfalls including the Salto Nacunday.
