= Santa Rosa del Monday =

District in the Alto Paraná Department, Paraguay

Coordinates: 25°48′S 54°54′W

Santa Rosa del Monday is a district of the Alto Paraná Department, Paraguay.
