= Domingo Martínez de Irala, Paraguay =

Domingo Martínez de Irala
- District
- Location within Paraguay
- Coordinates: 25°56′17″S 54°43′29″W
- Country: Paraguay
- Department: Alto Paraná
- Foundation: 7 July 1896

Government
  - Intendente municipal: Derlis Javier Benegas Carrera

Area
  - Total: 334 km^{2} (129 sq mi)
- Elevation: 249 m (817 ft)

Population (2017)
  - Total: 5,956
- Time zone: -4 Gmt
- Postal code: 7700
- Area code: (595) (678)
- Climate: Cfa

Domingo Martínez de Irala is a district located in the Alto Paraná Department of Paraguay.
