= Ciudad del Este =

Ciudad del Este Táva Kuarahyresẽme (Guarani)
- City
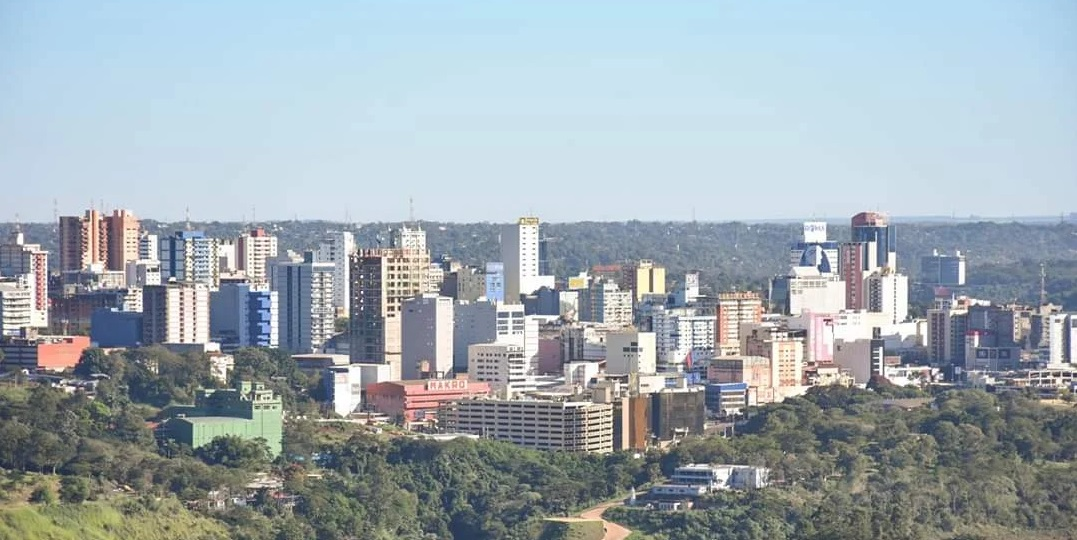
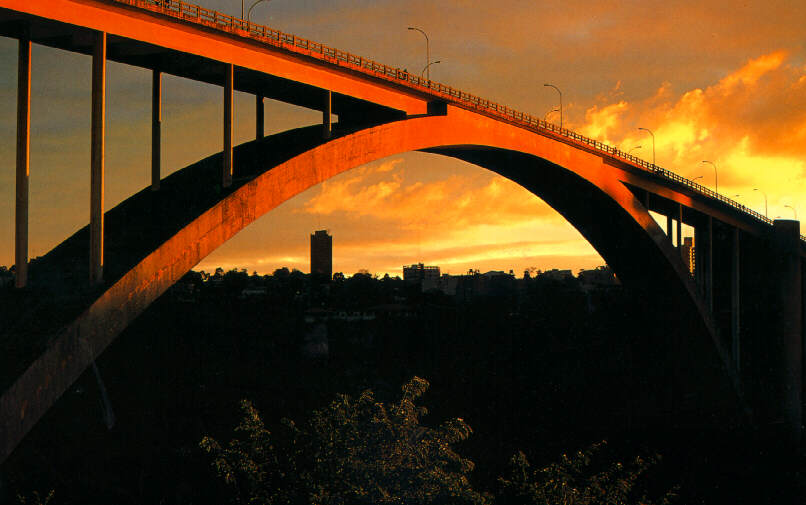
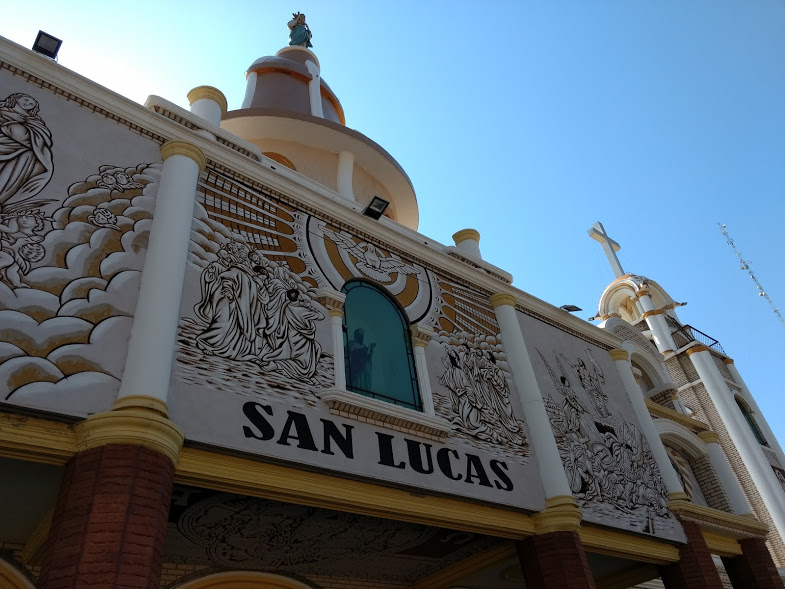
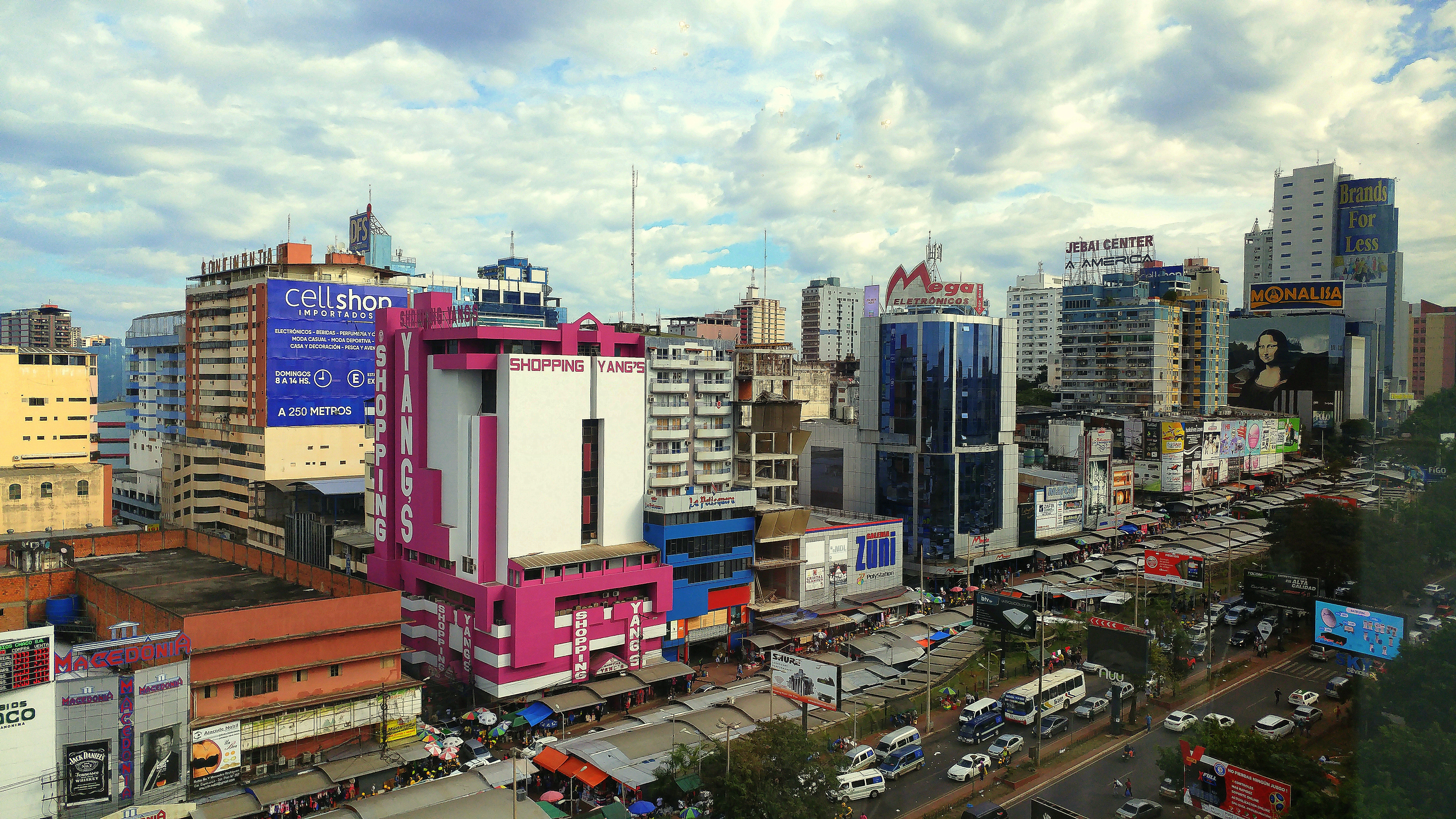
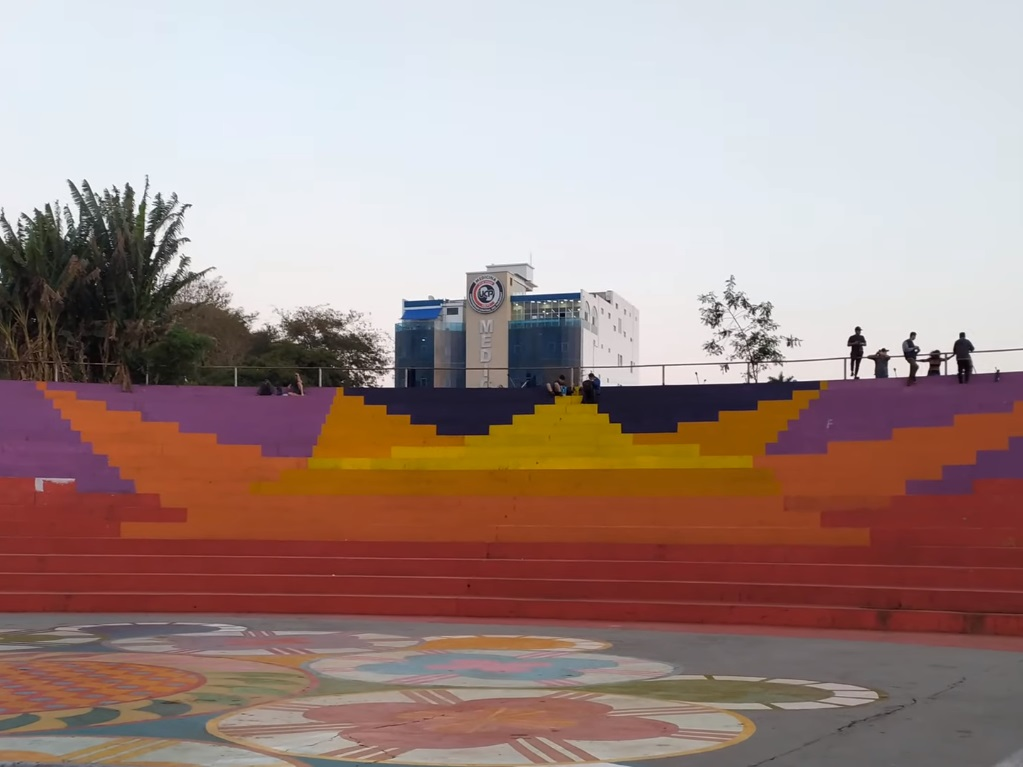
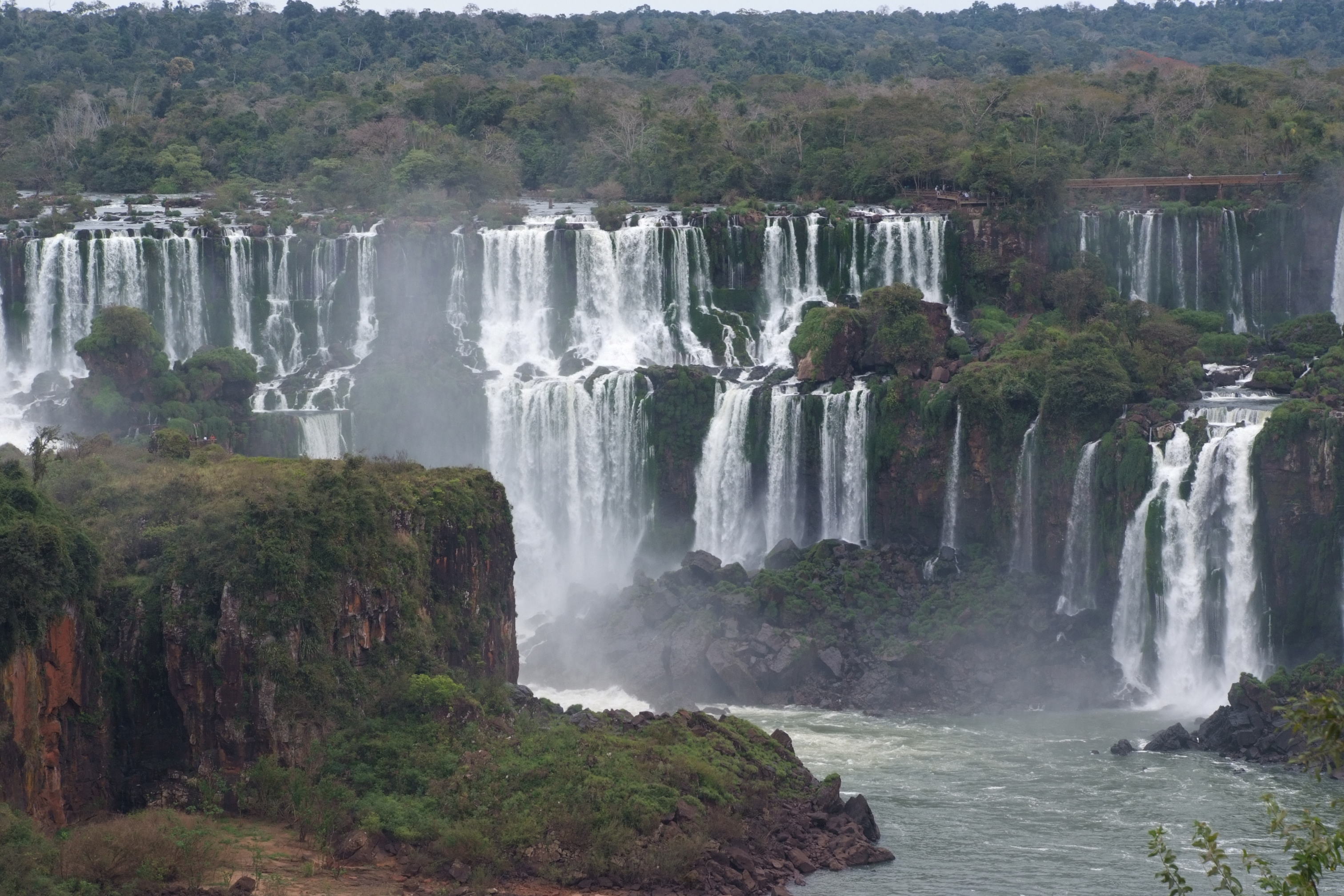
- Downtown Friendship Bridge between Brazil and Paraguay Parish of Saint Luke Comercial Center Anfiteatro del Lago Nearby Iguazu Falls Ciudad del Este, Paraguay

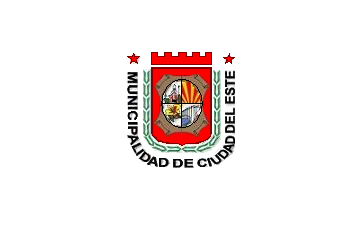
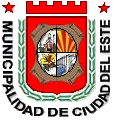
- Flag Coat of arms

- Location of Ciudad del Este in Paraguay
- Coordinates: 25°31′00″S 54°37′00″W
- Country: Paraguay
- Department: Alto Paraná
- Founded: 3 February 1957 (69 years ago)

Government
  - Intendente Municipal: Miguel Prieto

Area
  - City: 104 km^{2} (40 sq mi)

Population (2022)
  - City: 325,819
  - Rank: 2nd
  - Density: 3,130/km^{2} (8,110/sq mi)
  - Metro: 546,643

GDP (PPP, constant 2015 values)
  - Year: 2023
  - Total: $4.7 billion
- Time zone: UTC-03 (PYT)
- Postal code: 7000
- Area code: +595 (61)
- Climate: Cfa
- Website: Official website

Ciudad del Este (Spanish pronunciation: [sjuˈðað ðel ˈeste], Spanish for Eastern City; often shortened as CDE) is the second-largest city in Paraguay and capital of the Alto Paraná Department, situated on the Paraná River. It is located 327 km (203 mi) east of Asunción, the capital, and is adjacent to the border with Brazil, to which it is connected by the Friendship Bridge on the Paraná River. It is the largest city within the Triple Frontier region, which borders Foz do Iguaçu, Brazil and Puerto Iguazú, Argentina. The Itaipú Dam, one of the largest hydroelectric power plants in the world, is near Ciudad del Este, as is Iguazu Falls.

Ciudad del Este is a commercial city, and is one of the largest free-trade zones in the world. Its tax-free status attracts many Brazilians and Argentines to the city.

Ciudad del Este has consulates-general for Argentina, Brazil, and Taiwan, and honorary consulates for France, Germany, Italy, Mexico, Peru, Slovakia, Spain, Syria, Turkey, and Uruguay.

The city is home to Club Atlético 3 de Febrero, whose home ground Estadio Antonio Aranda was used for the 1999 Copa América and is Paraguay's third biggest football stadium.

The city is the seat of the Roman Catholic Diocese of Ciudad del Este.

== History ==
After the fall of Argentine President Juan Domingo Perón in the 1950s, the government of Alfredo Stroessner took the decision to vigorously promote the so-called "March to the East", seeking to reach the Atlantic Ocean, through Brazil. The main problem encountered in the exit through the Río de la Plata was the excessively expensive freight, which made the exported products commercially uncompetitive. In 1955, the Mixed Paraguayan-Brazilian Commission was set up to boost the highway to the East, and in 1956 a reconnaissance flight was made on Alto Paraná. The construction of a road route to the Paraná River bank was led by Captain Porfirio Pereira Ruiz Díaz, who supervised several army units in the building of a 200-kilometre section from Coronel Oviedo.

On 3 February 1957, the city now known as Ciudad del Este was founded by decree, but with the name of "Puerto Flor de Lis" ("Port Lily Flower") close by a location known as Tacuru pucu ("Tall Termite Hill" in the Guarani) which was for a time the upper limit of navigation on the Paraná River.

Later, it was renamed "Puerto Presidente Stroessner" ("President Stroessner Port"), in honor of the dictator Alfredo Stroessner.

After the 1989 Paraguayan coup d'état, a referendum was held to decide on a new name, and Ciudad del Este ("East City") was chosen.

Settlement in the region was hampered by dense jungle, but the city and the local economy expanded rapidly after the construction of the Friendship Bridge and the Acaray and Itaipu dams during the 1960s and 1970s. The city has attracted many immigrants and now has sizeable Chinese, Arab, Indian, and Korean populations. It is the second most developed and populated city in the country.

== Geography ==
The city, coextensive with the homonymous district, is located in south-eastern Paraguay. Part of an international tripoint known as the "Triple Frontier", Ciudad del Este lies opposite the Brazilian city of Foz do Iguaçu (state of Paraná). Separated from it by Paraná River, it is linked by the Friendship Bridge. The Argentine border is located between the neighboring town of Presidente Franco and Puerto Iguazú (Misiones Province). Ciudad del Este, along with the towns and districts of Hernandarias, Minga Guazú, and Presidente Franco, forms a metropolitan area named Gran Ciudad del Este (Greater Ciudad del Este).

Ciudad del Este is on the international route that connects southeastern Bolivia (Santa Cruz) with southern Brazil. This has contributed to the city's development as a smuggling post between Paraguay and Brazil.

=== Hydrography ===
The Paraná River borders the city to the east. The district is also surrounded by the Acaray River to the north, which separates it from Hernandarias District, while to the southwest it is surrounded by the Monday River that separates it from the municipality of Los Cedrales. In the city there are other streams, lakes, and bridges:

- Amambay Stream, on the Monday side, feeds the Republic Lake.
- Acaraymí Stream, on the Acaray side, connects with the Amambay stream underground.
- Saltito Stream, located in the southeast, serves as a boundary with the jurisdiction of Presidente Franco.
- The Republic Lake, is the recreational site par excellence in the city.
- The Yrendy Lake, located in the neighborhood Monday about 1,000 meters (1 km) from Route 7, was designated an ecological sanctuary for its beauty and natural wealth through a municipal resolution.
- The José Costa Cavalcanti bridge over the Acaray river, popularly known as "Puente Seco" (Dry Bridge), is a junction between Mariscal López Avenue and the Itaipú Superhighway which connects the Pablo Rojas neighborhood with the Paraná Country Club of Hernandarias.
- The Peru bridge, over the Acaray river, connects the Don Bosco neighborhood with the Itaipú neighborhood of Hernandarias.

=== Climate ===
Ciudad del Este has a humid subtropical climate under Köppen's climate classification. Summer is hot and humid, with an average of 26 °C (79 °F) in January. The high humidity usually becomes suffocating in the heat. Winter is temperate and irregular; temperatures between 0 °C (32 °F) and 30 °C (86 °F) have been recorded. The average daily temperature is 16 °C (61 °F) in July.

Ciudad del Este sees on average roughly 1,700 millimetres (67 in) of precipitation annually. In the winter of 1982, it snowed for the first time in the city, being the second snowfall registered in the country.

Climate data for Ciudad del Este (1991-2020)
Month	Jan	Feb	Mar	Apr	May	Jun	Jul	Aug	Sep	Oct	Nov	Dec	Year
Record high °C (°F)	41.4 (106.5)	40.0 (104.0)	39.4 (102.9)	37.2 (99.0)	35.0 (95.0)	32.0 (89.6)	33.0 (91.4)	36.6 (97.9)	42.4 (108.3)	40.8 (105.4)	40.0 (104.0)	40.6 (105.1)	42.4 (108.3)
Mean daily maximum °C (°F)	32.5 (90.5)	32.0 (89.6)	31.3 (88.3)	28.6 (83.5)	24.4 (75.9)	23.2 (73.8)	23.2 (73.8)	25.9 (78.6)	27.5 (81.5)	29.6 (85.3)	30.7 (87.3)	31.9 (89.4)	28.4 (83.1)
Daily mean °C (°F)	26.3 (79.3)	25.8 (78.4)	25.0 (77.0)	22.5 (72.5)	18.3 (64.9)	17.3 (63.1)	16.6 (61.9)	18.6 (65.5)	20.5 (68.9)	23.1 (73.6)	24.2 (75.6)	25.7 (78.3)	22.0 (71.6)
Mean daily minimum °C (°F)	21.4 (70.5)	21.2 (70.2)	20.1 (68.2)	17.6 (63.7)	13.9 (57.0)	12.6 (54.7)	11.4 (52.5)	12.8 (55.0)	15.0 (59.0)	17.9 (64.2)	18.7 (65.7)	20.5 (68.9)	16.9 (62.4)
Record low °C (°F)	10.5 (50.9)	10.0 (50.0)	7.0 (44.6)	4.6 (40.3)	−0.2 (31.6)	−1.5 (29.3)	−3.0 (26.6)	−1.0 (30.2)	0.8 (33.4)	4.0 (39.2)	6.4 (43.5)	8.2 (46.8)	−3.0 (26.6)
Average precipitation mm (inches)	182.6 (7.19)	179.5 (7.07)	148.8 (5.86)	139.1 (5.48)	167.4 (6.59)	129.3 (5.09)	93.9 (3.70)	80.0 (3.15)	137.6 (5.42)	223.0 (8.78)	177.3 (6.98)	196.9 (7.75)	1,855.5 (73.05)
Average precipitation days (≥ 0.1 mm)	10	9	8	7	8	8	7	8	9	10	9	9	101
Average relative humidity (%)	75	77	77	80	83	84	79	77	75	74	72	72	77
Source: NOAA (precipitation days, humidity 1961-1990)

== Economy ==
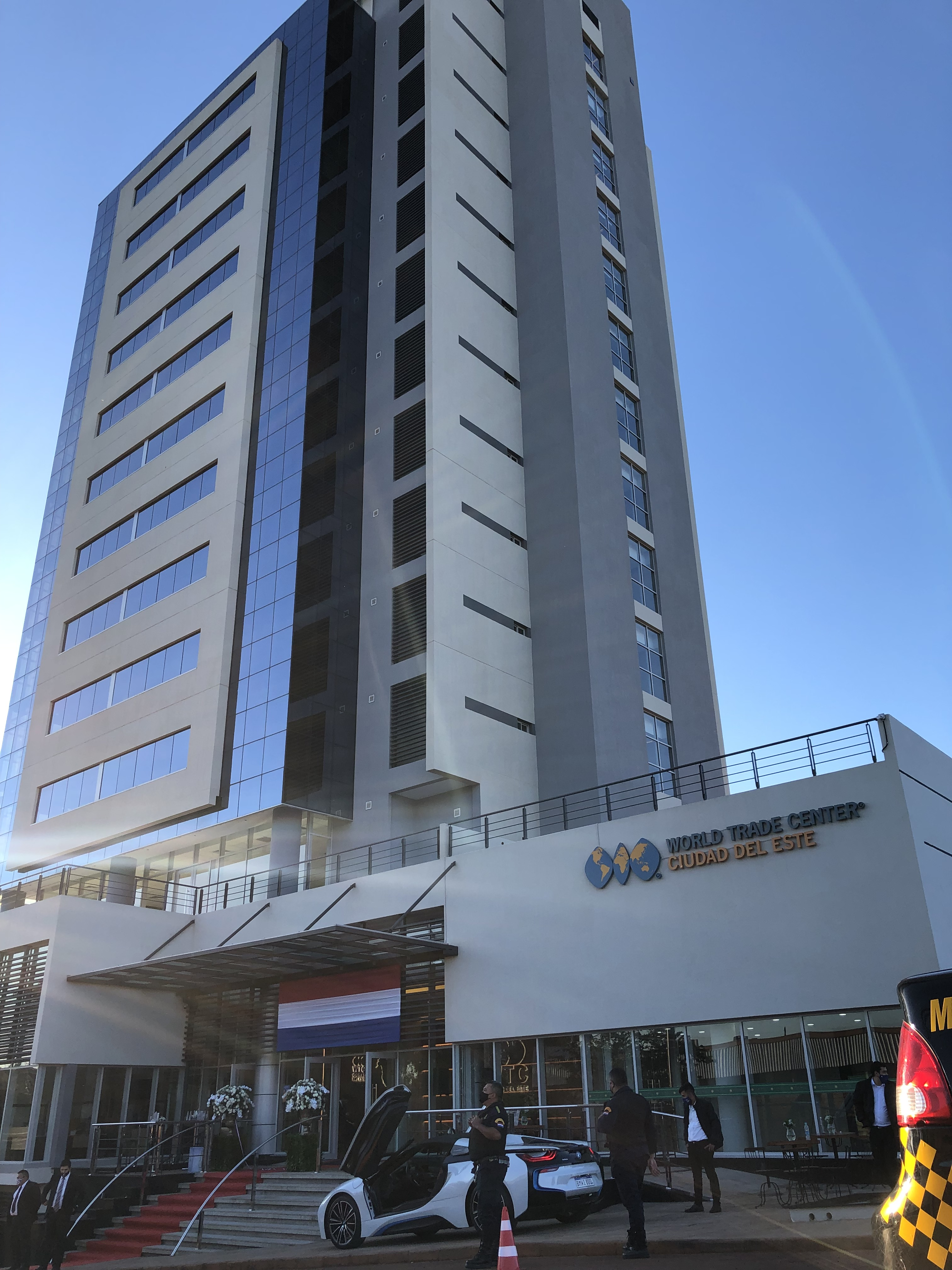
World Trade Center Ciudad del Este

Ciudad del Este is the second most important city in the country, after Asunción. It gathers 8% of Paraguayan gross domestic product, that is, about 3.5 billion dollars. Some 244 companies there operate in the Services Sector and in the Industrial Sector, among which stand out the manufacture of auto parts, the textile industry, maquilas, industries developer, and others. Since Ciudad del Este does not have rural areas, it does not have any measurable agro-livestock activity of its own, but it does serve as a regional nucleus for other adjacent urban centers which do have agro-livestock activity, such as Hernandarias, Presidente Franco and Minga Guazú. The city has a large food market with more than 800 shops selling fruits, vegetables, and clothing.

Ciudad del Este has repeatedly been on the list of notorious markets for infringing goods by the United States Trade Representative. The city is the headquarters of the company that operates the nearby Itaipu Dam.

The city's economy (along with Paraguay's economy) relies heavily on the mood of the Brazilian economy, as 95% of Paraguay's share of the energy generated by the Itaipu Dam is sold to Brazil (for US$300 million), and that every day many Brazilians cross the border to buy less expensive products (US$1.2 billion, mostly electronics). Officially, you do not need to declare less than $300 worth of goods brought from Ciudad del Este to Brazil. However, it is worth noting that people have found loopholes to this law by getting some of the boys and young men sitting by the Friendship Bridge to transport any items in excess of $300.

Smuggling is a major occupation in the city, with some estimates putting the value of this black market at five times the national economy. It is reported that Lebanese immigrants with links to Hezbollah are operating money laundering activities and cocaine trafficking in the city.

In recent decades, Ciudad del Este has seen the development of a market in electronic and computer products, as well as consumer products, as well as luxury (perfumes, fine alcohols, and others). The economy of the city has diversified, led essentially by the installation of new industrial activities outside the traditional commercial focus, such as agribusiness, because in the city are located the largest agricultural companies in the country.

=== Tourism ===
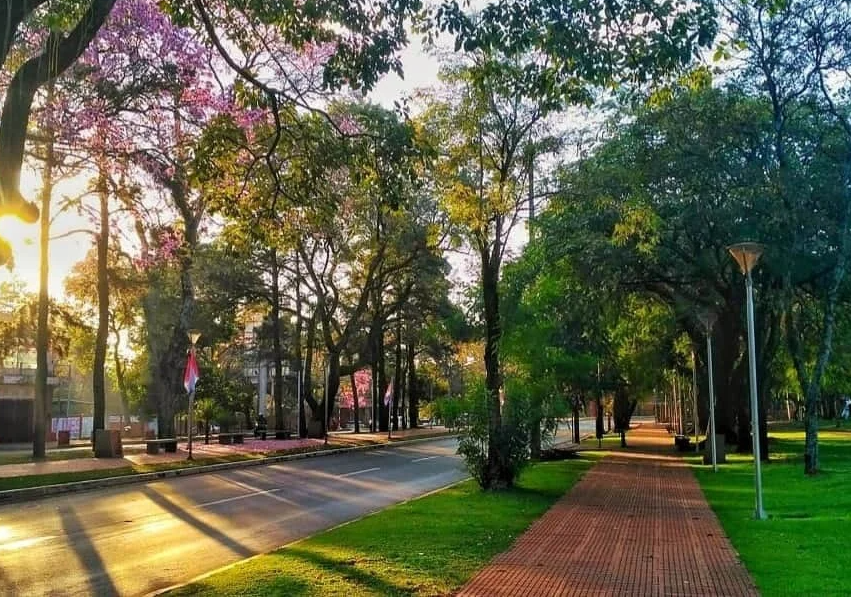
Bernardino Caballero Avenue

It has hotels, modern shopping centers, restaurants, casino and night entertainment centers. While shopping tourism is what most characterizes Ciudad del Este, in the area there are numerous tourist attractions of various kinds, as they constitute the most striking presentation letter of the central core in the region, like the internationally known as the Triple Frontier; there, Paraguay, Brazil and Argentina converge each other:

- 20 km to the north, in Hernandarias is the Itaipú dam, one of the largest hydroelectric power plants in the world, and the Museum of the Guaraní Land;
- 8 km to the south, in President Franco are the Saltos del Monday, waterfalls on the Monday River;
- 26 km to the south is the Moisés Bertoni Scientific Monument, a protected area where is the house in which the wise man carried out his research and publications;
- 20 km to the east, on the border between Argentina and Brazil, are the majestic Iguazu Falls.

== Demographics ==
Population by sex and ages (2019)
Age	Quantity	Male	Female
0 – 4 years	30.577	15.531	15.046
5 – 14 years	61.300	31.160	30.140
15 – 29 years	83.984	43.060	40.924
30 – 44 years	63.218	30.625	32.593
45 – 64 years	48.857	24.706	24.151
65 – 79 years	11.926	6.350	5.576
80+ years	1.953	960	993
Total	301.815	152.393	149.422
%	100	50.5	49.5

Ciudad del Este is the most populous city in the country after Asunción, with a population of 301,815 persons, including 152,393 men and 149,422 women, according to projections of the DGEEC for 2019.

It represents 36.8% of the departmental population (819,589) and 4.22% of the national population (7,152,703).

Ciudad del Este is a multicultural and diverse city. It is home to a large Asian-born population, specifically of Taiwanese, Korean, Lebanese and Iranian origin, evident in the city's mosques and pagodas. From the 1970s, Sunni Muslim Arabs moved to the city. This changed in the 1980s to Shia Muslim Arabs from South Lebanon.

According to the Asuncion Times, there are 7,000 Muslims in the city, and 13,000 more in the surrounding region. The largest mosque in the region is called Al-Khulafa Al-Rashidin Mosque, or Mosque of the East, inaugurated in 2015.

As in the rest of the country, a large part of the population is bilingual in both, Spanish and Guaraní, in addition to Jopara, but the use of Portuguese is also common for thousands of people and is mainly used in the commercial and agricultural sector. Thanks to the strong presence of Asian and Middle Eastern immigrants, languages such as Arabic, Chinese, and Korean are commonly used in the downtown area of the city both in conversation and in posters.

=== Neighborhoods ===
Ciudad del Este is organized territorially in 30 neighborhoods. Route No. 7 "Dr. Gaspar Rodríguez de Francia" divides the city into two parts: 9 neighborhoods in the north and 21 neighborhoods in the south. The Microcentro neighborhood is the only one located in the middle of Route 7, extending minimally on the north side.

Neighborhoods of Ciudad del Este.

Historical population
Year	Pop.	±%
1972	26,485	—
1982	62,328	+135.3%
1992	133,881	+114.8%
2002	222,274	+66.0%
2012	281,422	+26.6%
2022	326,857	+16.1%

Neighborhoods of Ciudad del Este
N.º	Neighborhood	N.º	Neighborhood	N.º	Neighborhood
1	Montelindo	16	Microcentro	31	23 de Octubre
2	Las Palmeras	17	O'Leary	32	San Alfredo
3	San Ramón	18	San Miguel	33	Villa Fanny
4	Virgen del Huerto	19	Remansito	34	San Vicente de Paul
5	Villa Sofía	20	San Roque	35	San José
6	San Juan	21	Virgen de Fátima	36	San Isidro
7	Acaray	22	Bernardino Caballero	37	Ciudad Nueva
8	Don Bosco	23	Área 4	38	Juan Pablo II
9	Carolina	24	Área 3	39	Santa Lucía
10	29 de Septiembre	25	Área 8	40	El Pinar
11	La Blanca	26	Boquerón	41	San Francisco
12	María Auxiliadora	27	Área 1	42	Yrendy
13	Che La Reina	28	Defensores del Chaco	43	Villa Isabel
14	Pablo Rojas	29	San Lucas	44	Zona Industrial
15	San Blas	30	Santa Ana		

== Transportation ==
=== Air ===
Alejo García Airport was opened in 1959 and served the city until 1986. The historical building now serves as the City Library and the area of the runway is now a park.
The old airport was replaced by Guaraní International Airport, located in the suburb city of Minga Guazú, which connects the city with international cargo destinations, mostly in North and Latin America. There are no domestic or international regular passenger flights.

== Consular representations ==
The following countries have consular representations in Ciudad del Este:

- Argentina (Consulate-General): Boquerón c/Adrián Jara – Edificio China 7º piso
- Brazil (Consulate-General): Calle Pampliega 205 Esquina con Pai Perez
- China (ROC) (Consulate-General): Avda. de Lago s/n Barrio Boquerón CP 131

- France (Honorary Consulate): Paraná Country Club, Hernandarias, Casilla de correo 309, 7000 Ciudad del Este
- Germany (Honorary Consulate): Avenida Paraná 77, Paraná Country Club
- Mexico (Honorary Consulate): Av. Adrian Jara, edif. Banco Unión, 3º piso, Oficina 20
- Peru (Honorary Consulate): Km 4 ½, Monday, B° Bernardino Caballero
- Slovakia (Honorary Consulate): Calle Boquerón 310, Edif. Grupo Monalisa S.A.
- Syria (Honorary Consulate): Avda. 11 de Septiembre 399
- Turkey (Honorary Consulate): Av. Monseñor Rodríguez s/n entre Itaybaté y Rubio Ñu, Edificio Mannah 10 Piso A
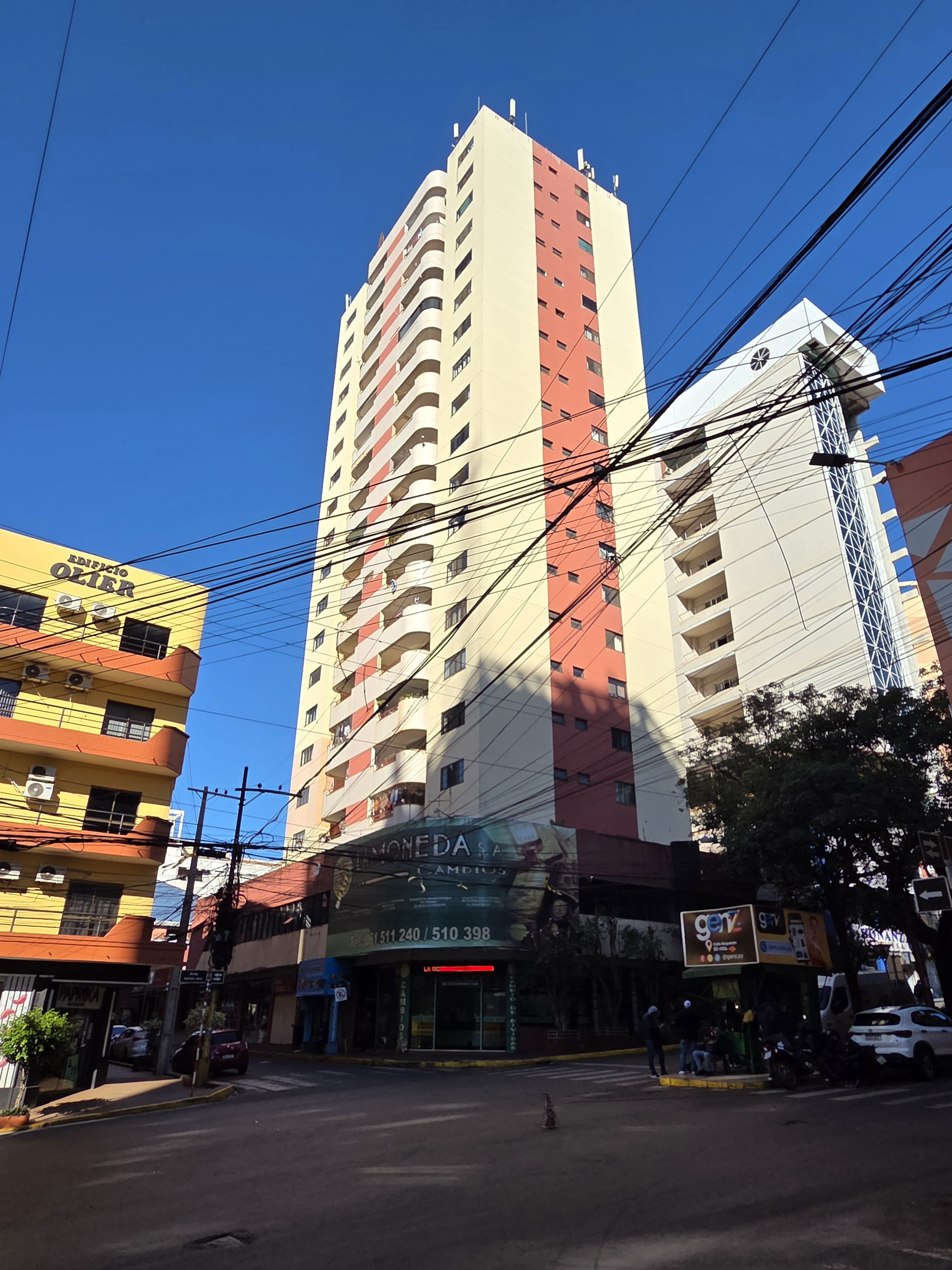
Building hosting the Consulate-General of Argentina

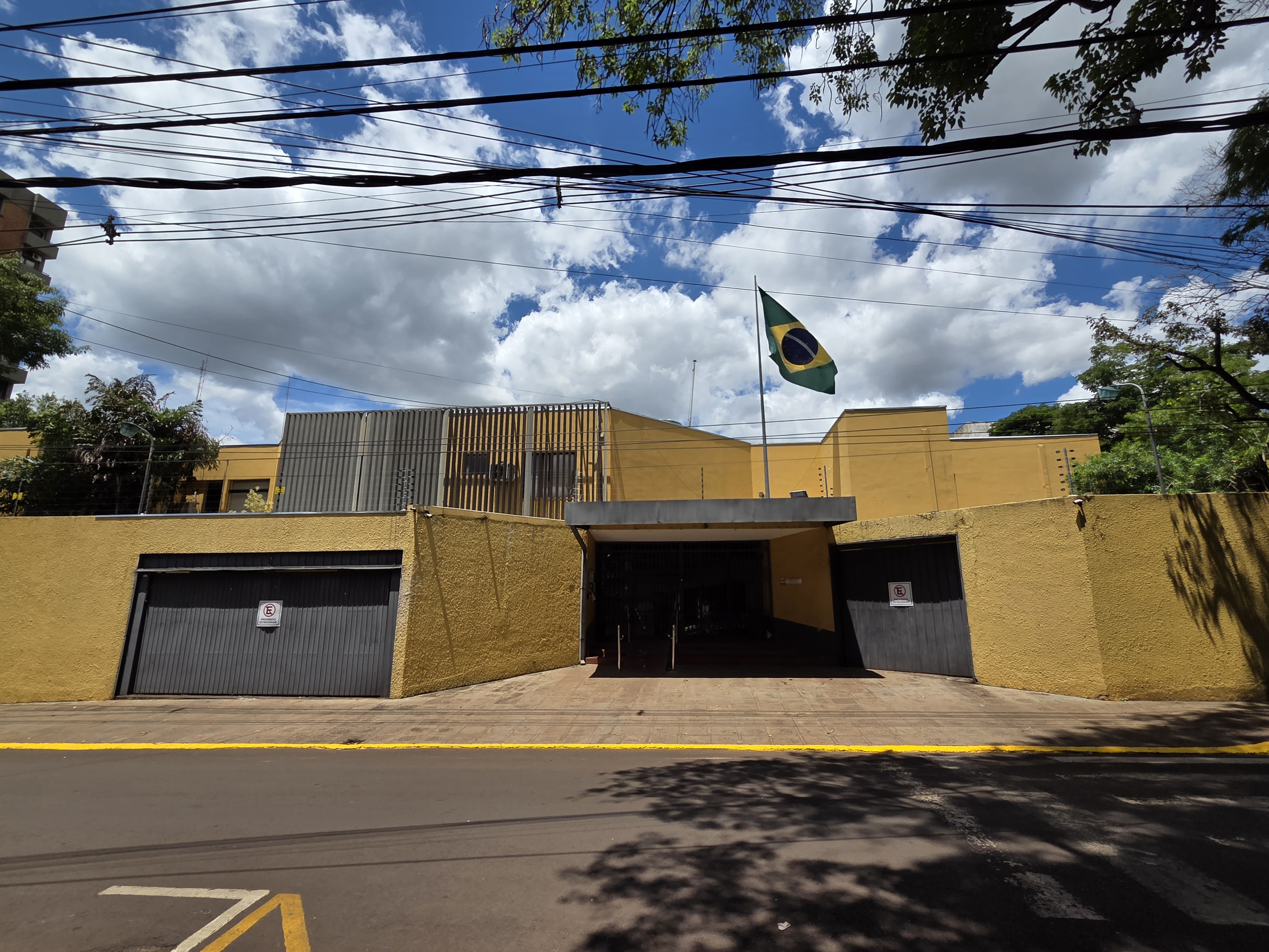
Consulate-General of Brazil

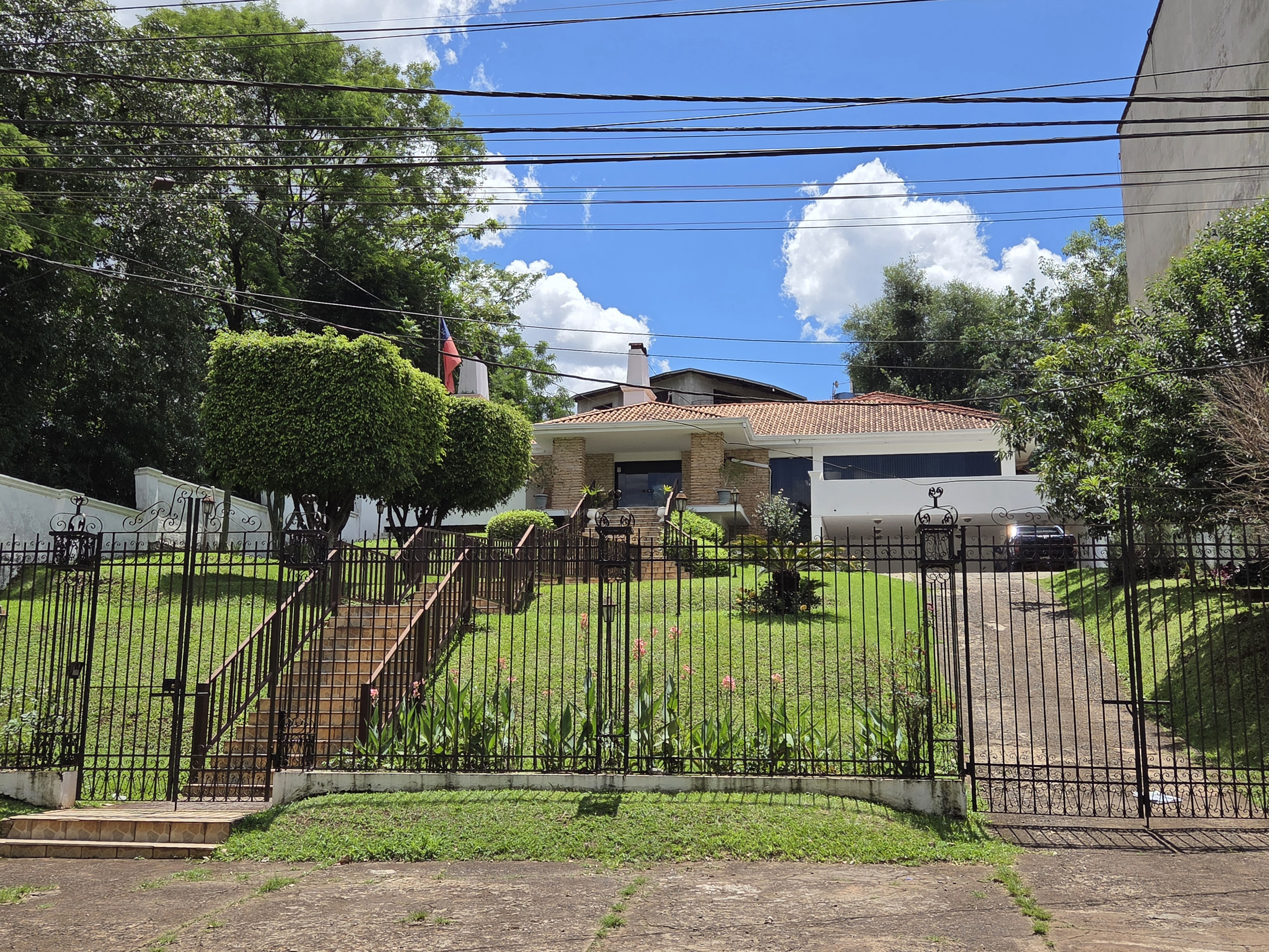
Consulate-General of China (ROC)

== Offices for legal, identification, and migration matters ==
- Identifications Department – Located on the street Súper Carretera
- Supreme Court of Justice – The place is also known as the Palace of Justice. Located near the Estadio Antonio Oddone Sarubbi of the Club Atlético 3 de Febrero: Avda. Bernardino Caballero e/ Cerro León
- Interpol – The city has a regional office of Interpol.
- National Direction of Migration – Located at the head of the Friendship Bridge bordering Brazil: Cabecera del Puente de la Amistad, margen derecho (Ruta Internacional Nº 7 – Dr. José Gaspar Rodriguez de Francia)

== Notable people ==
- Axel Bachmann: Chess player, two-time Ibero-American chess champion (2013–2014).
- Braian Samudio: Professional footballer.
- Fabián Balbuena: Professional footballer.

== Twin towns – sister cities ==
- Puerto Iguazú, Argentina

== Cooperation Agreements ==
Ciudad del Este cooperates with:

- José C. Paz Partido, Argentina

== Gallery ==
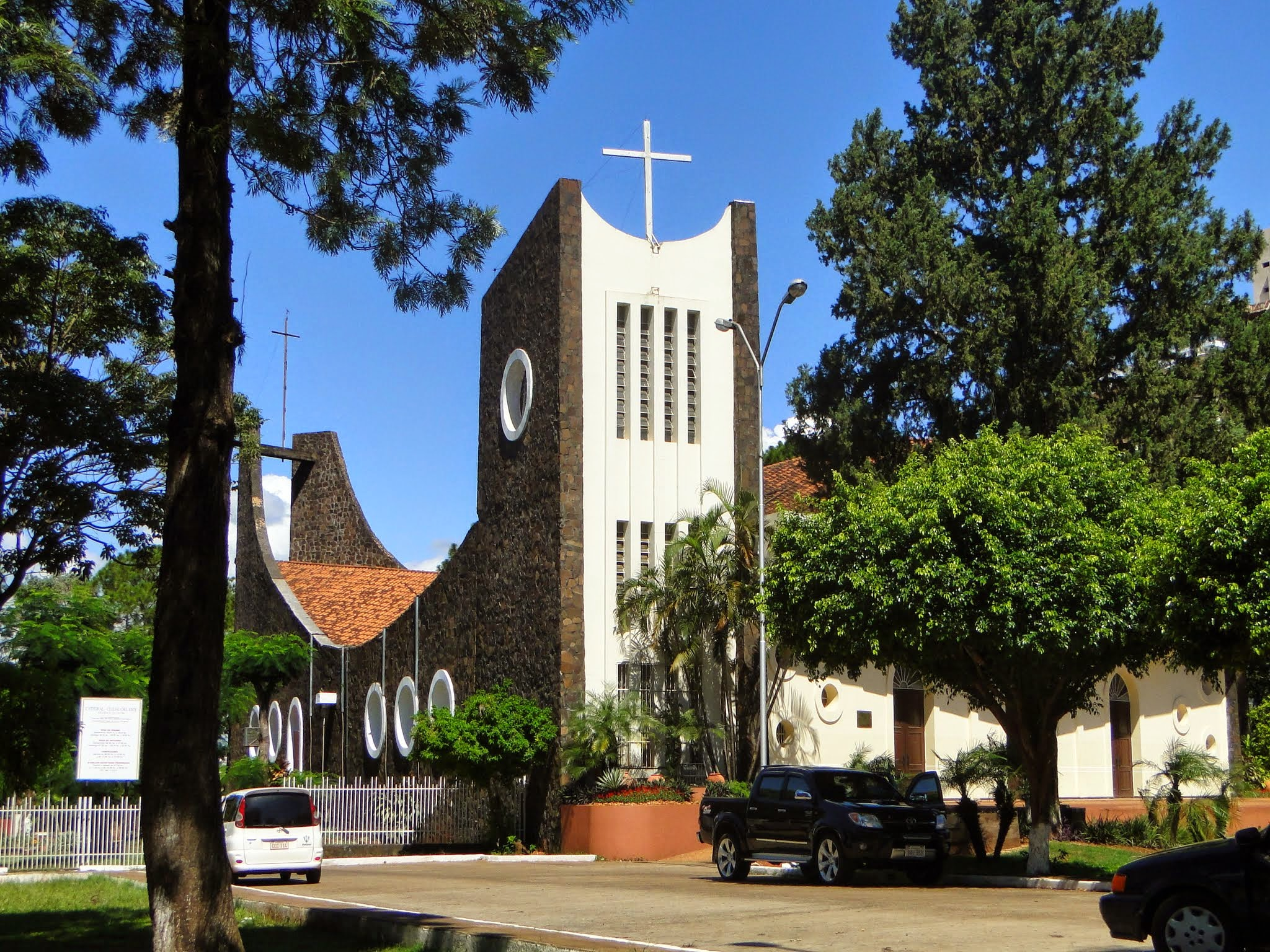
San Blás Cathedral

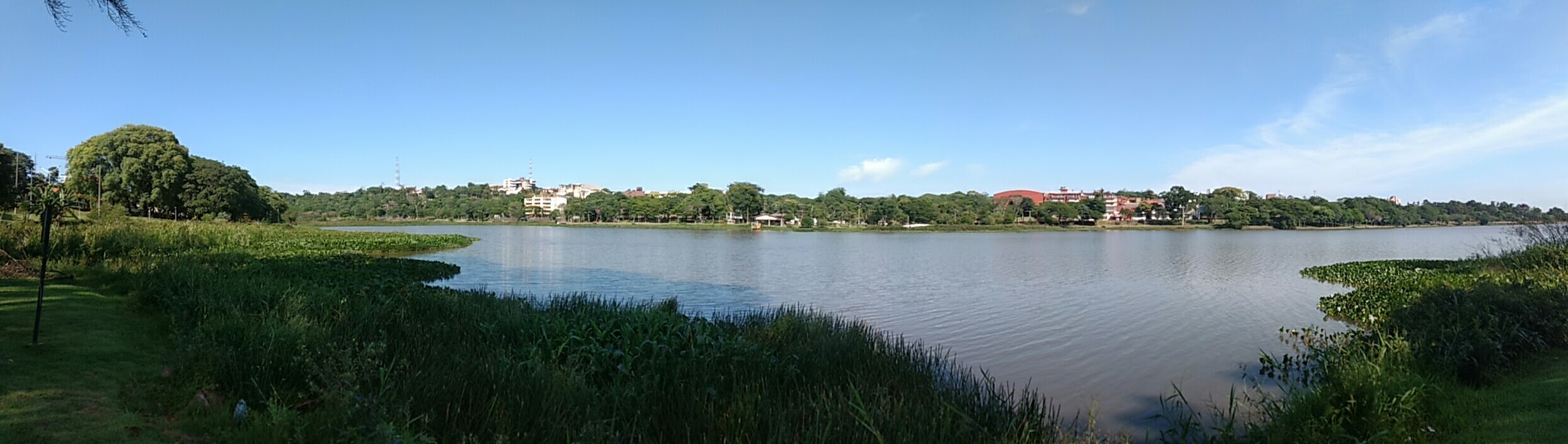
Lago de la República, CDE

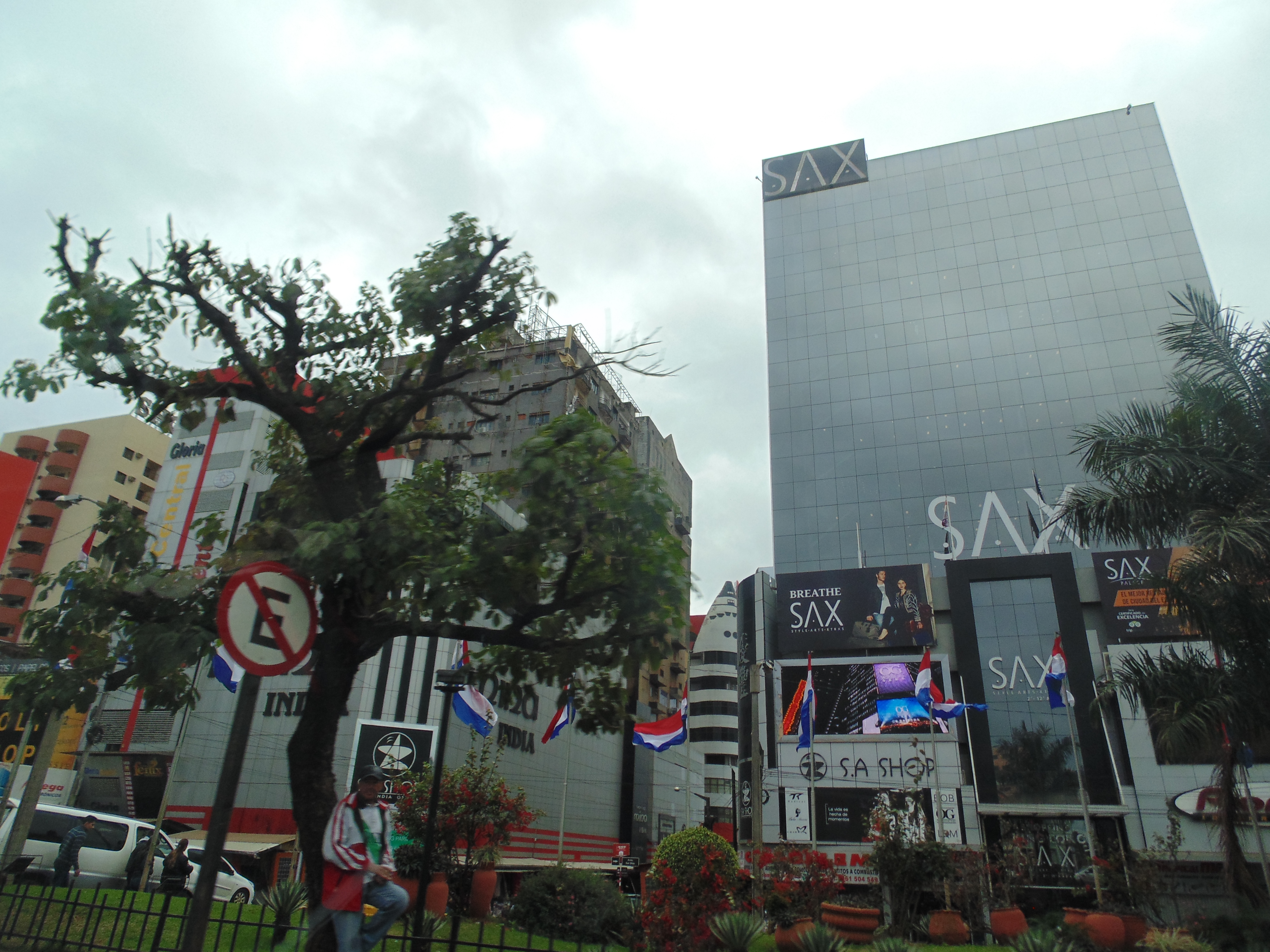
San Blas Avenue

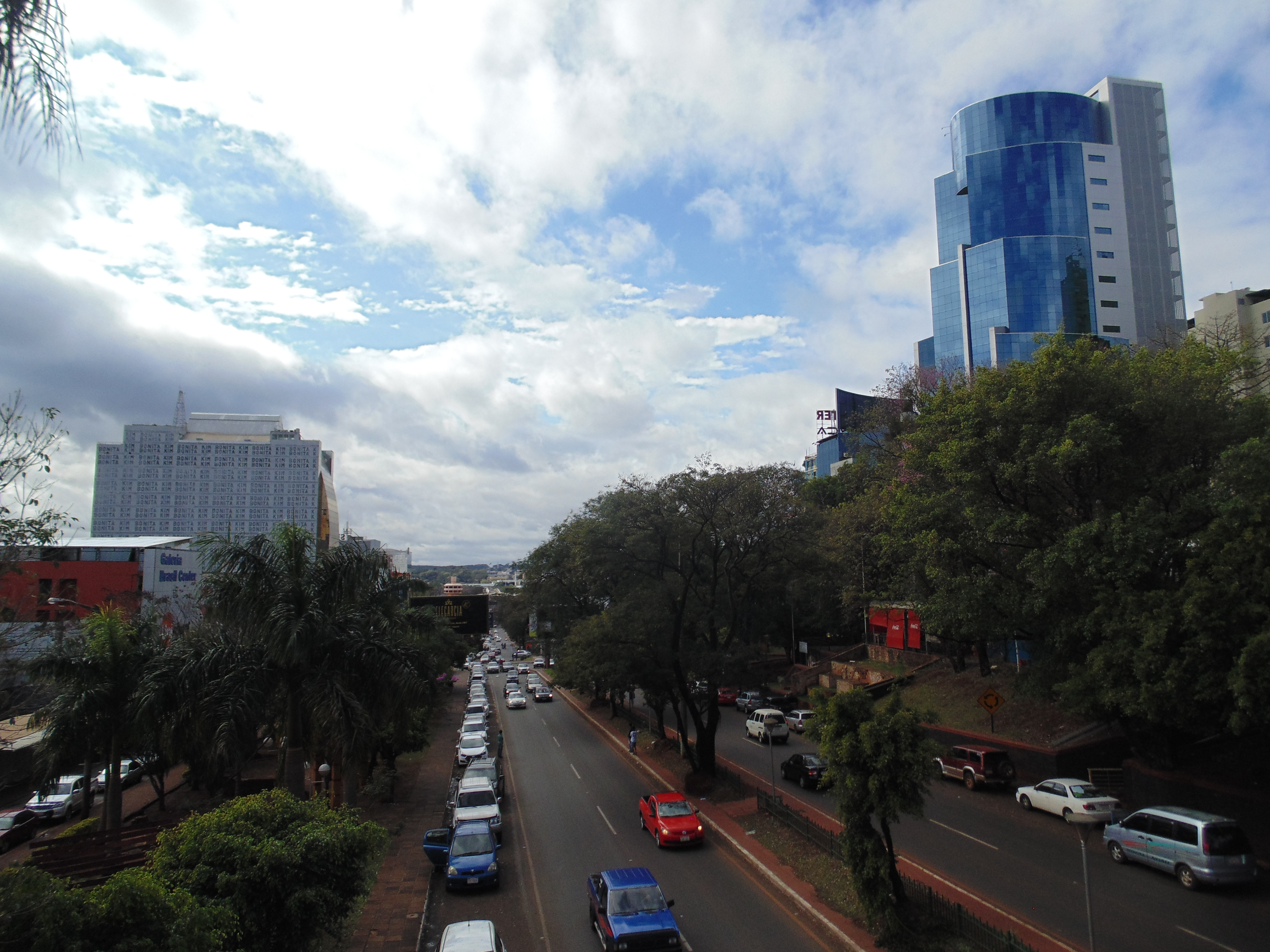
Ciudad del Este, Paraguay

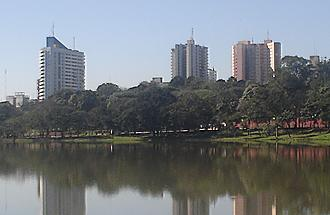
Ciudad del Este, Paraguay

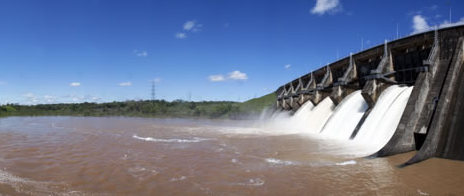
Acaray Hydroelectric, Ciudad del Este, Paraguay

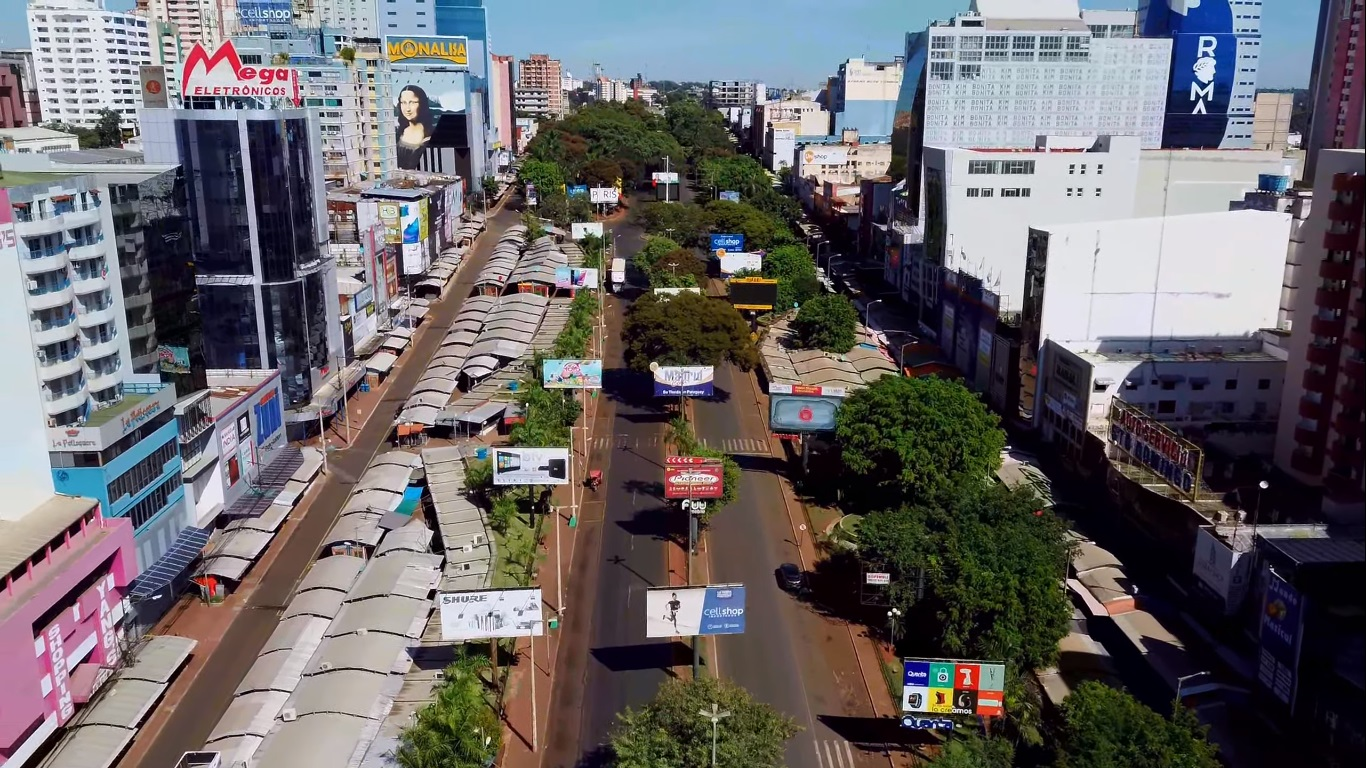
Downtown

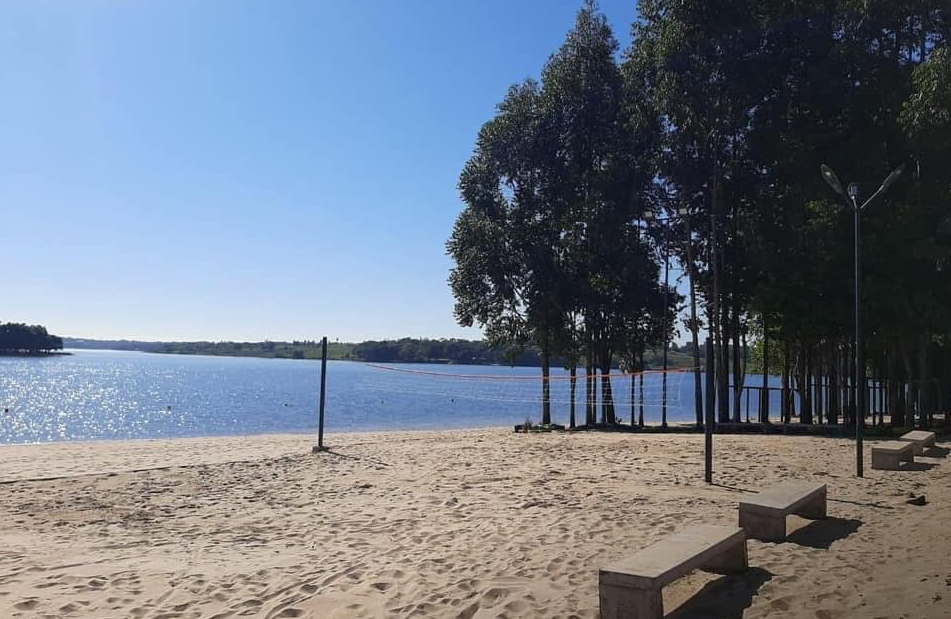
Ñanerendá Beach

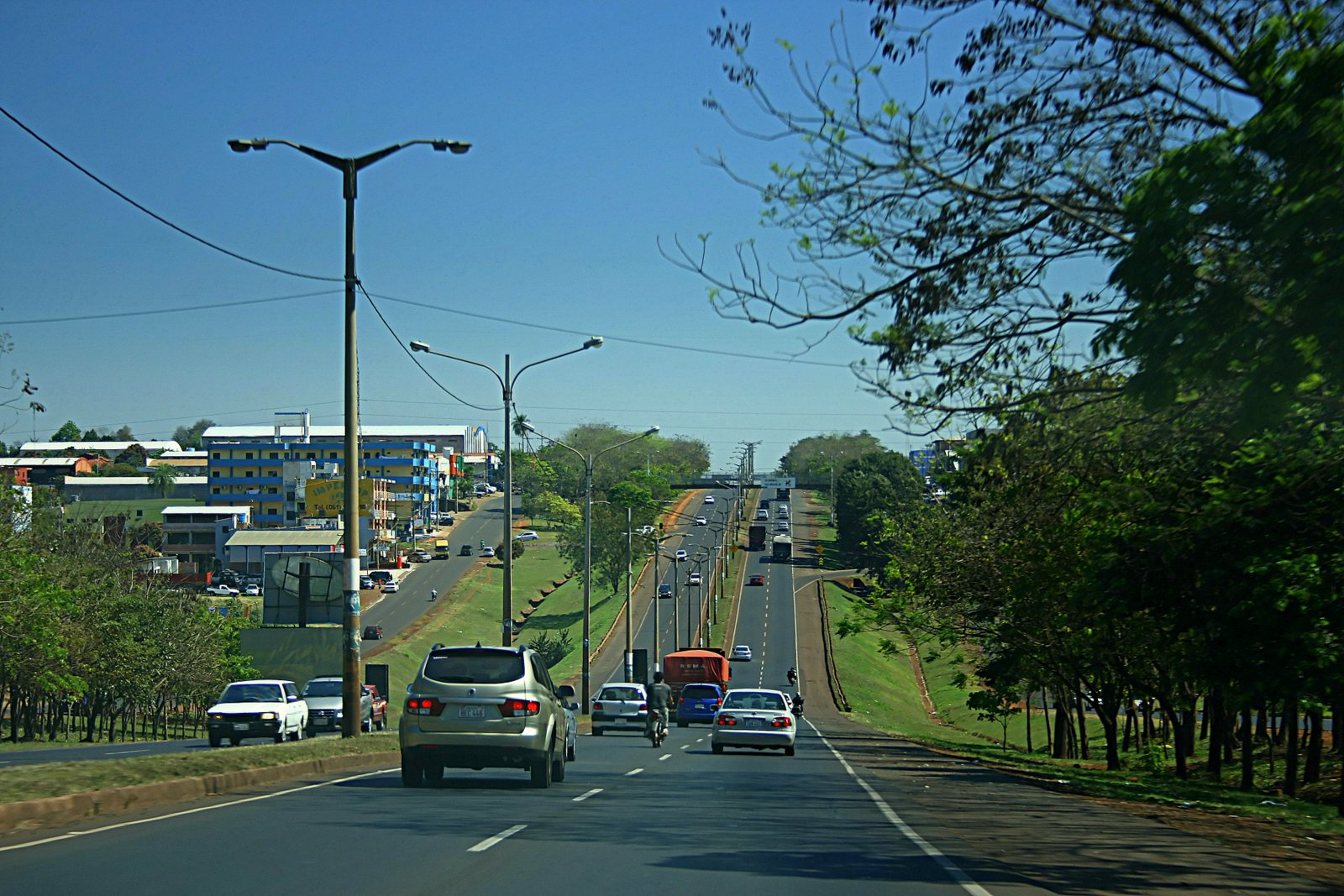
Tape Pora Highway at km 4, near Ciudad del Este, Paraguay

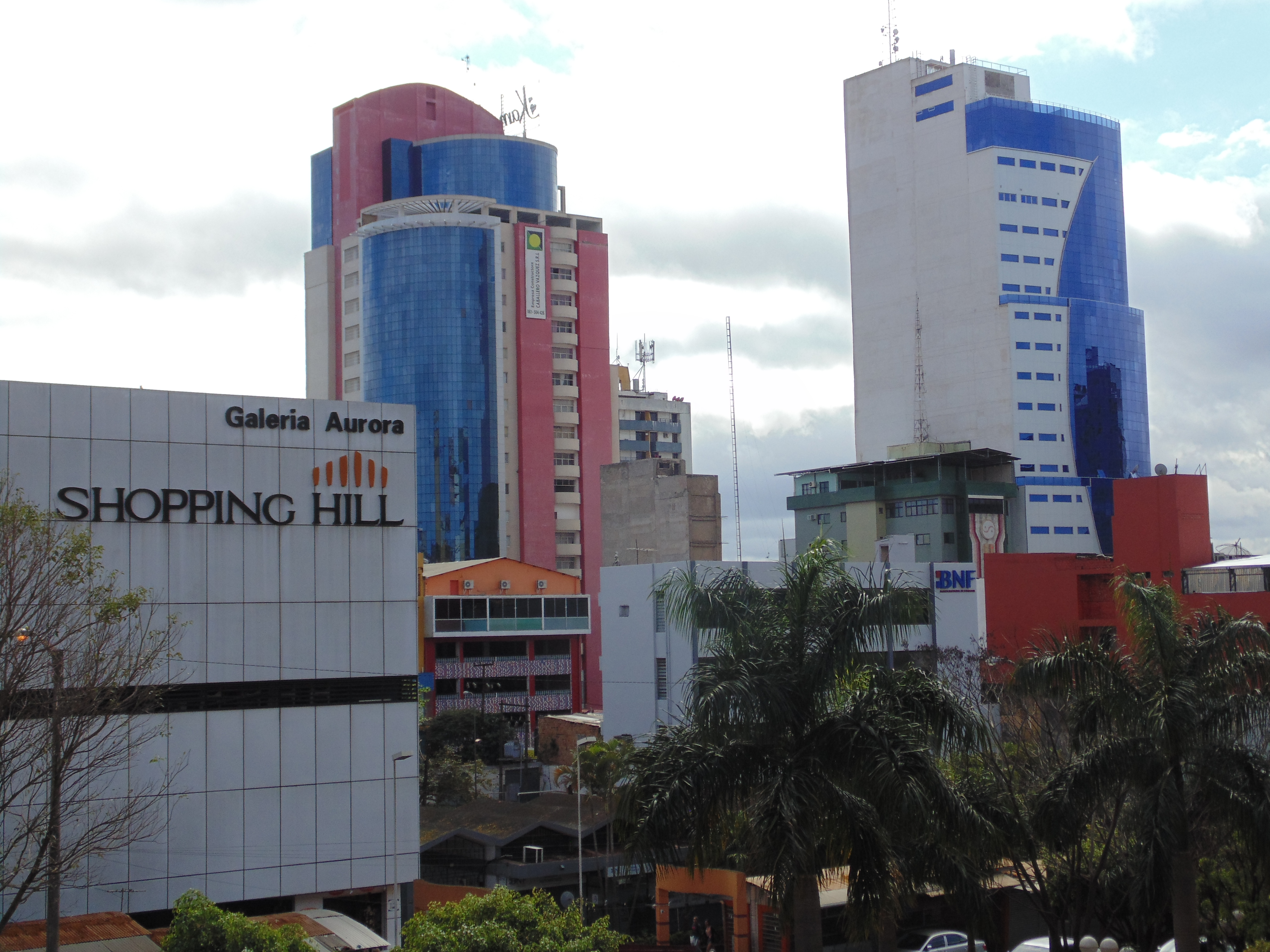
Ciudad del Este, Paraguay

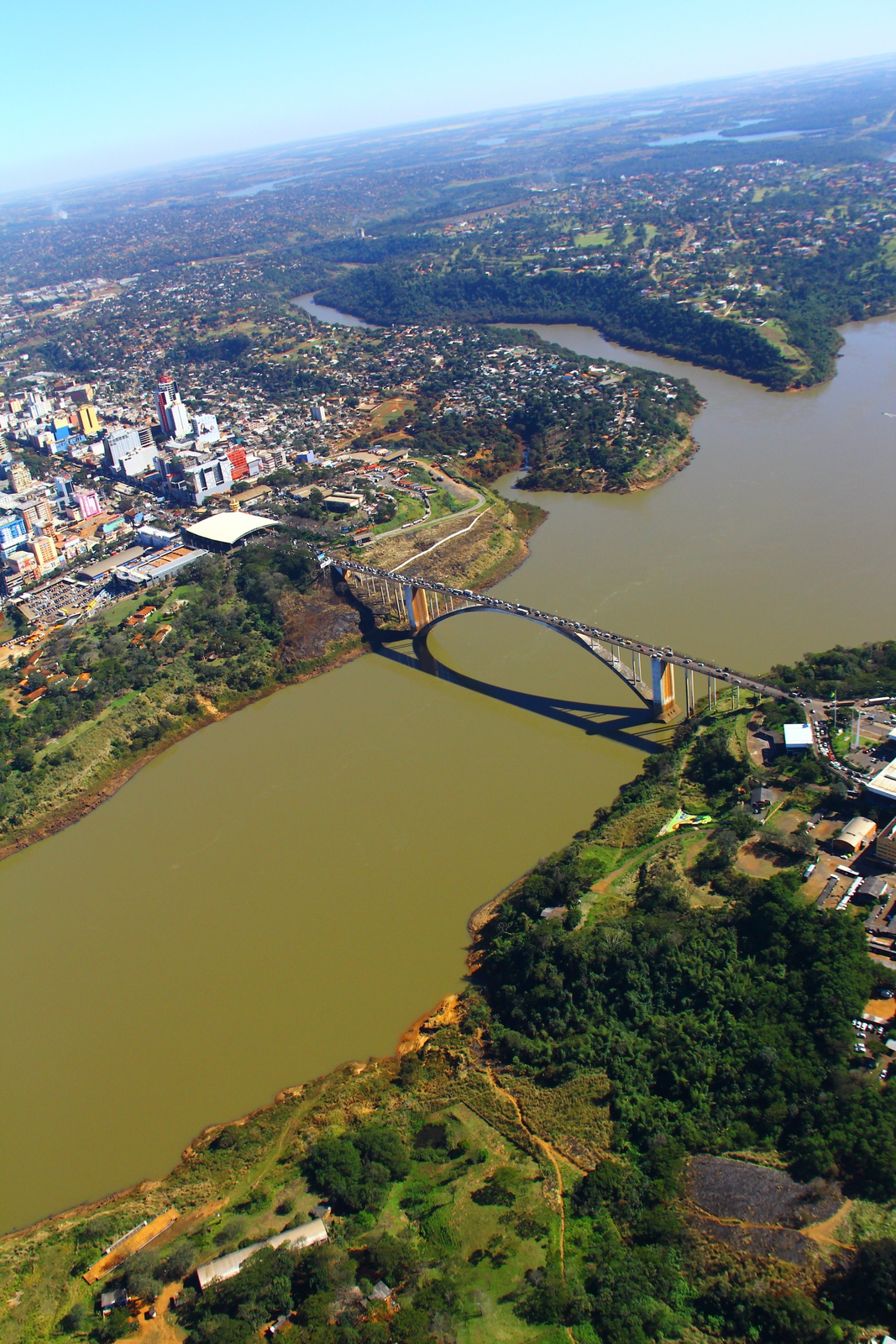
Friendship bridge with Brazil

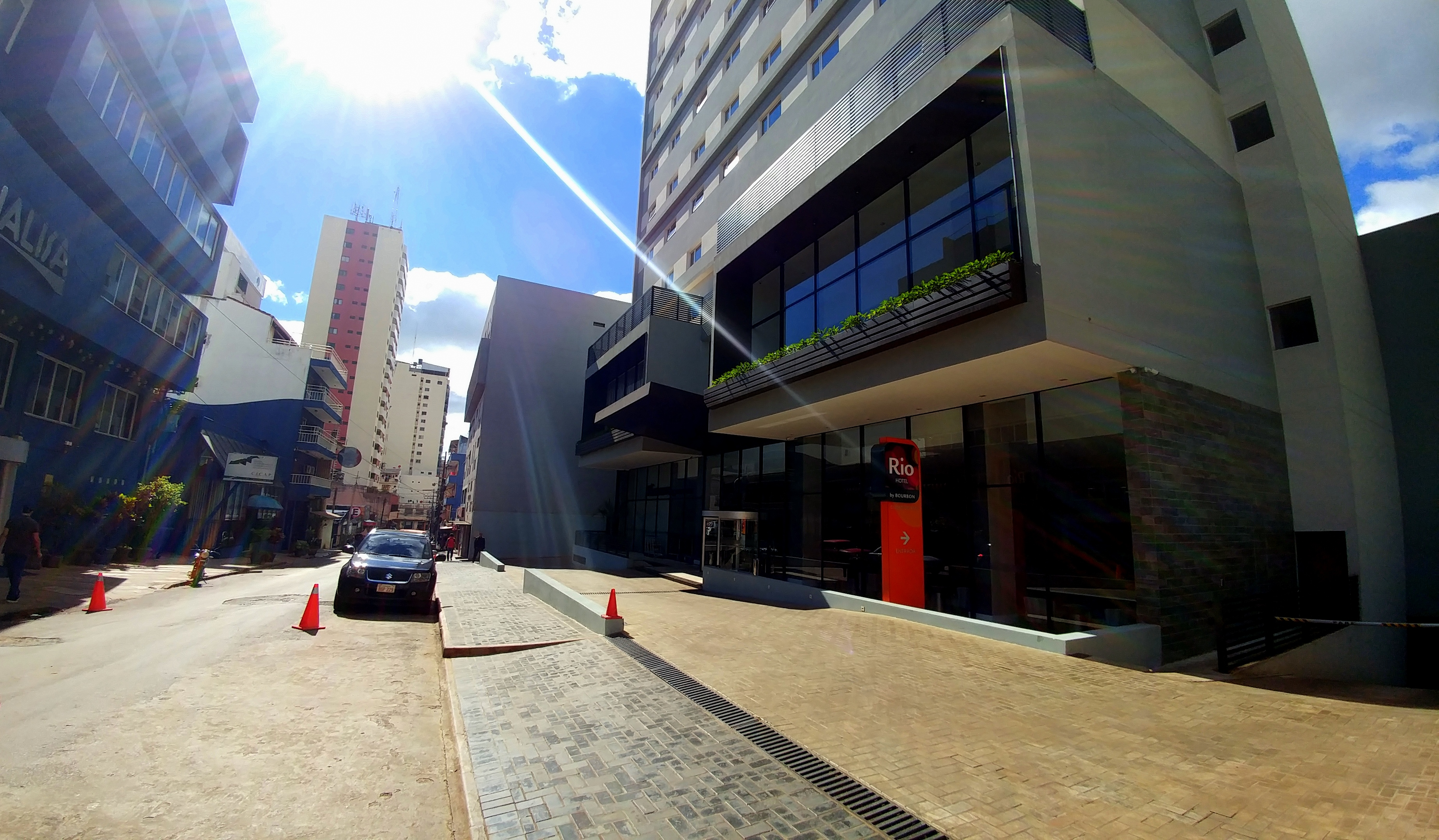
Boqueron Street

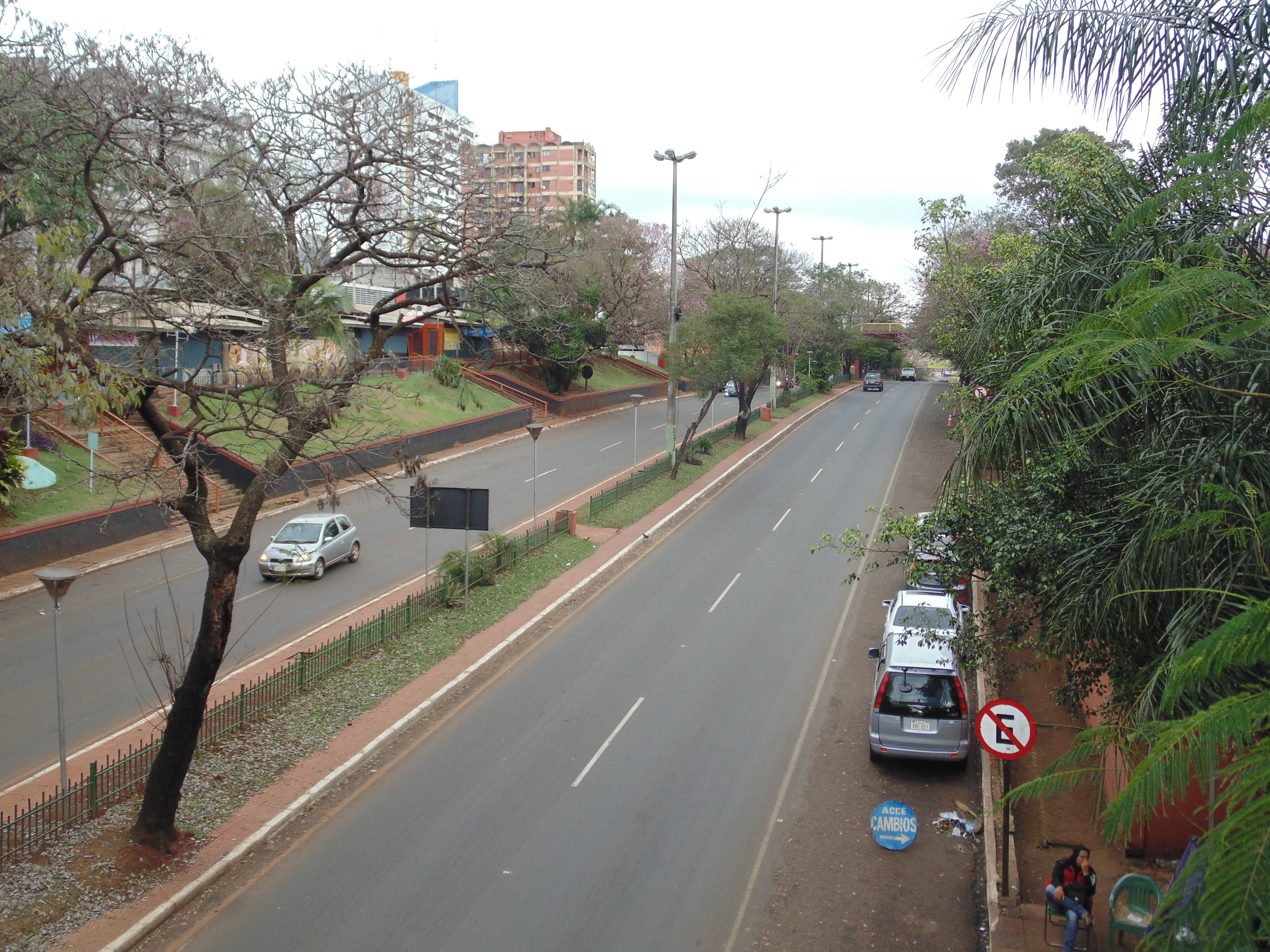
CDE, Paraguay

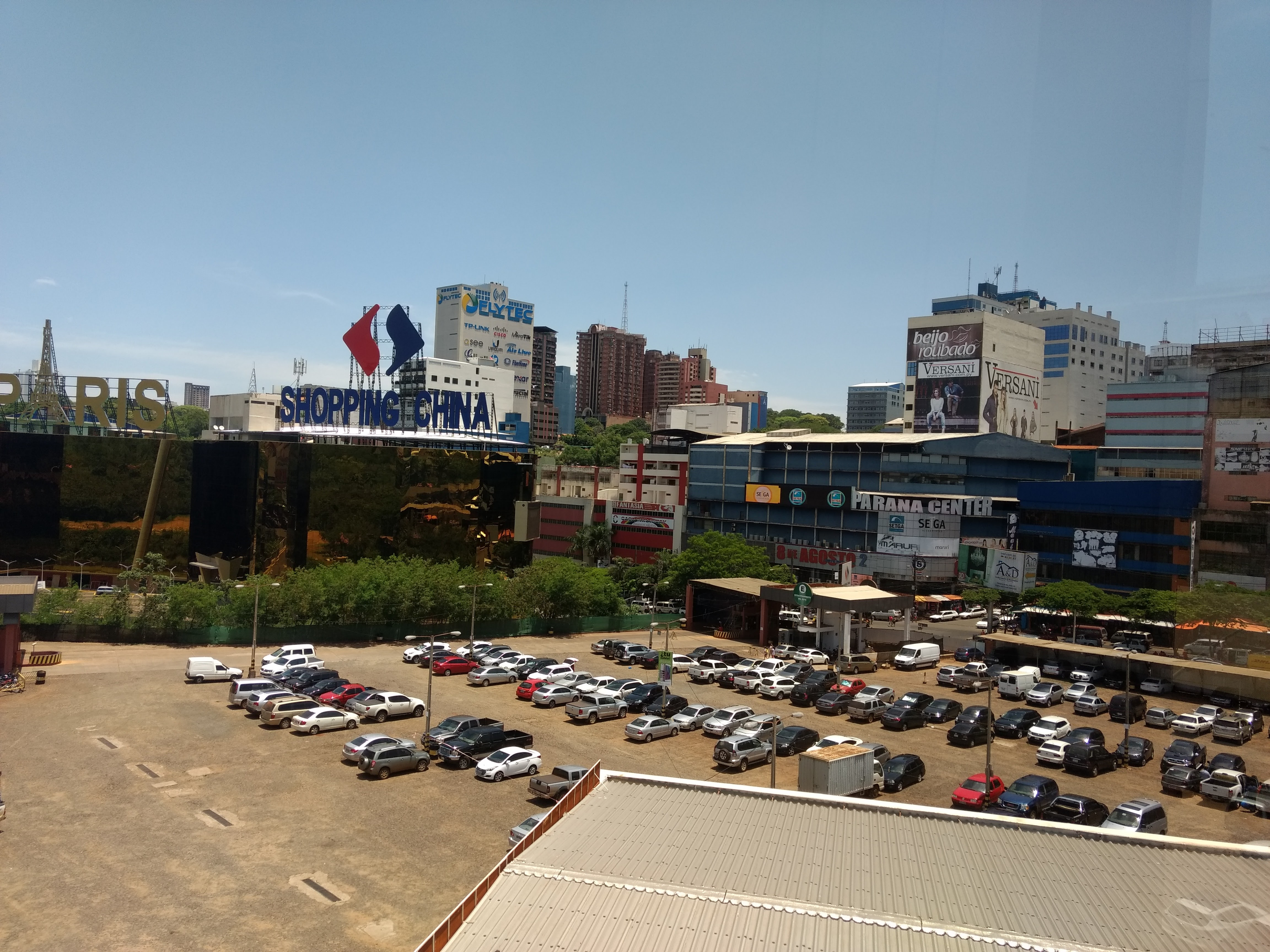
Ciudad del Este, Paraguay

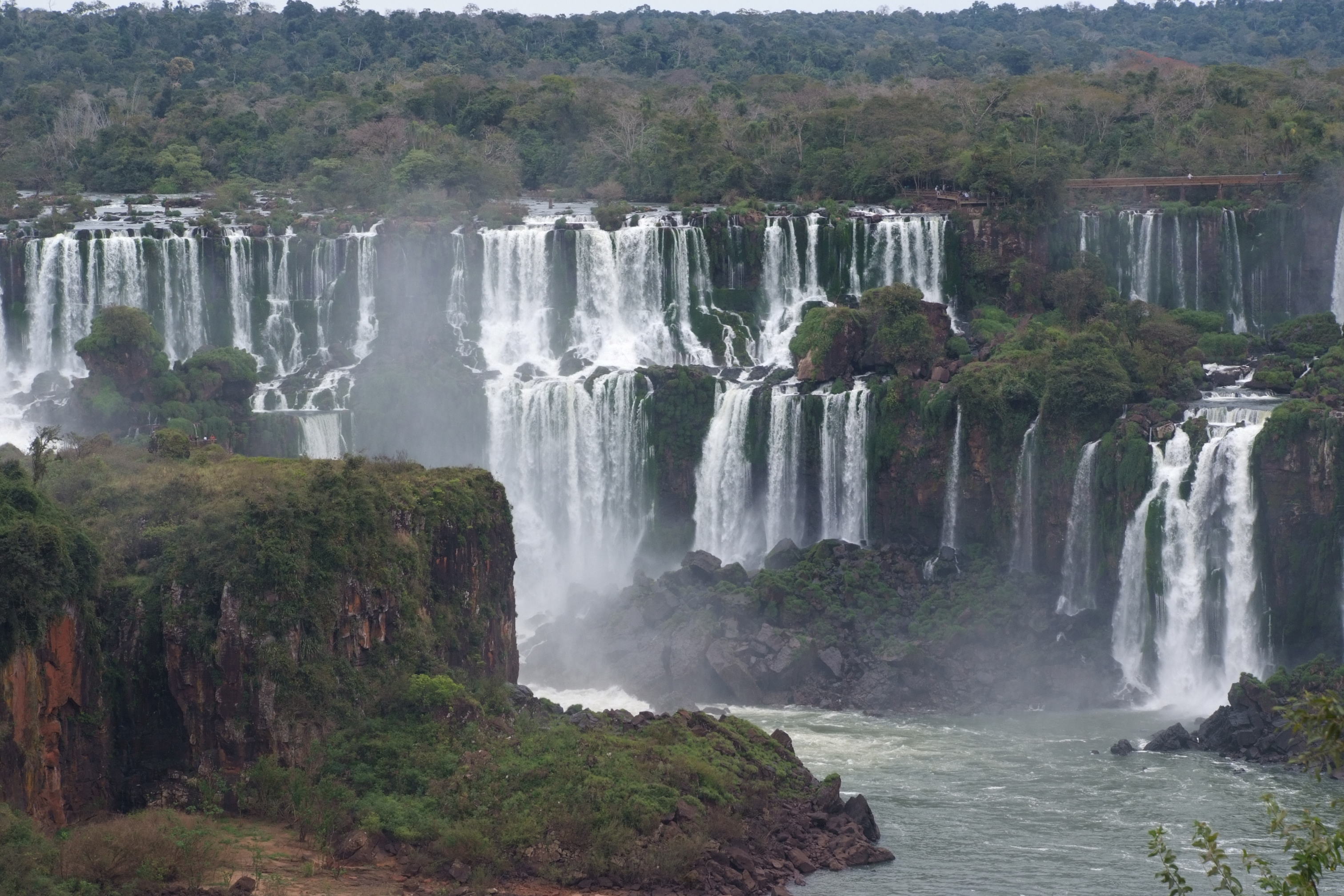
Nearby Iguazu Falls, Paraguay

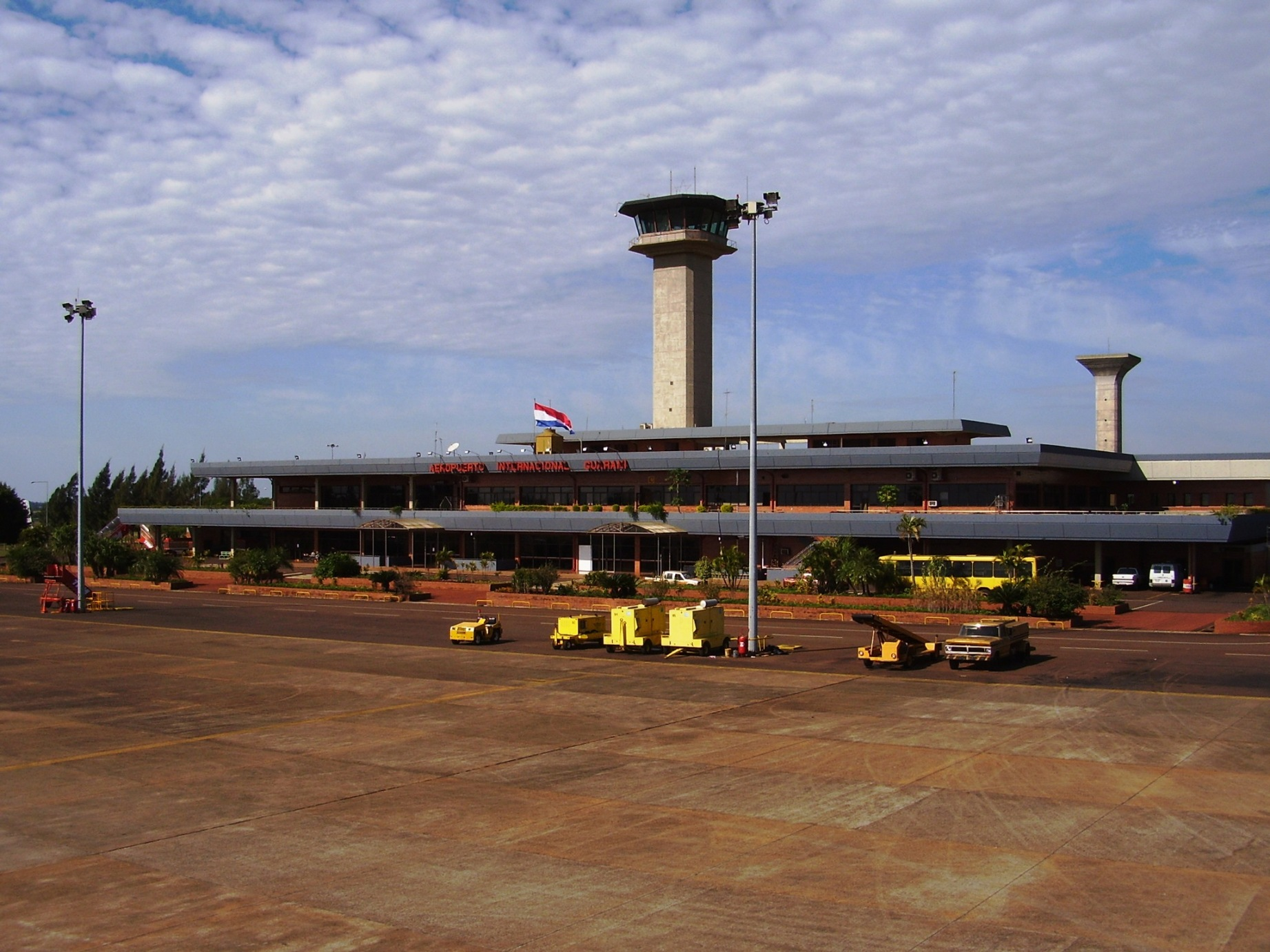
Guaraní Airport terminal air side

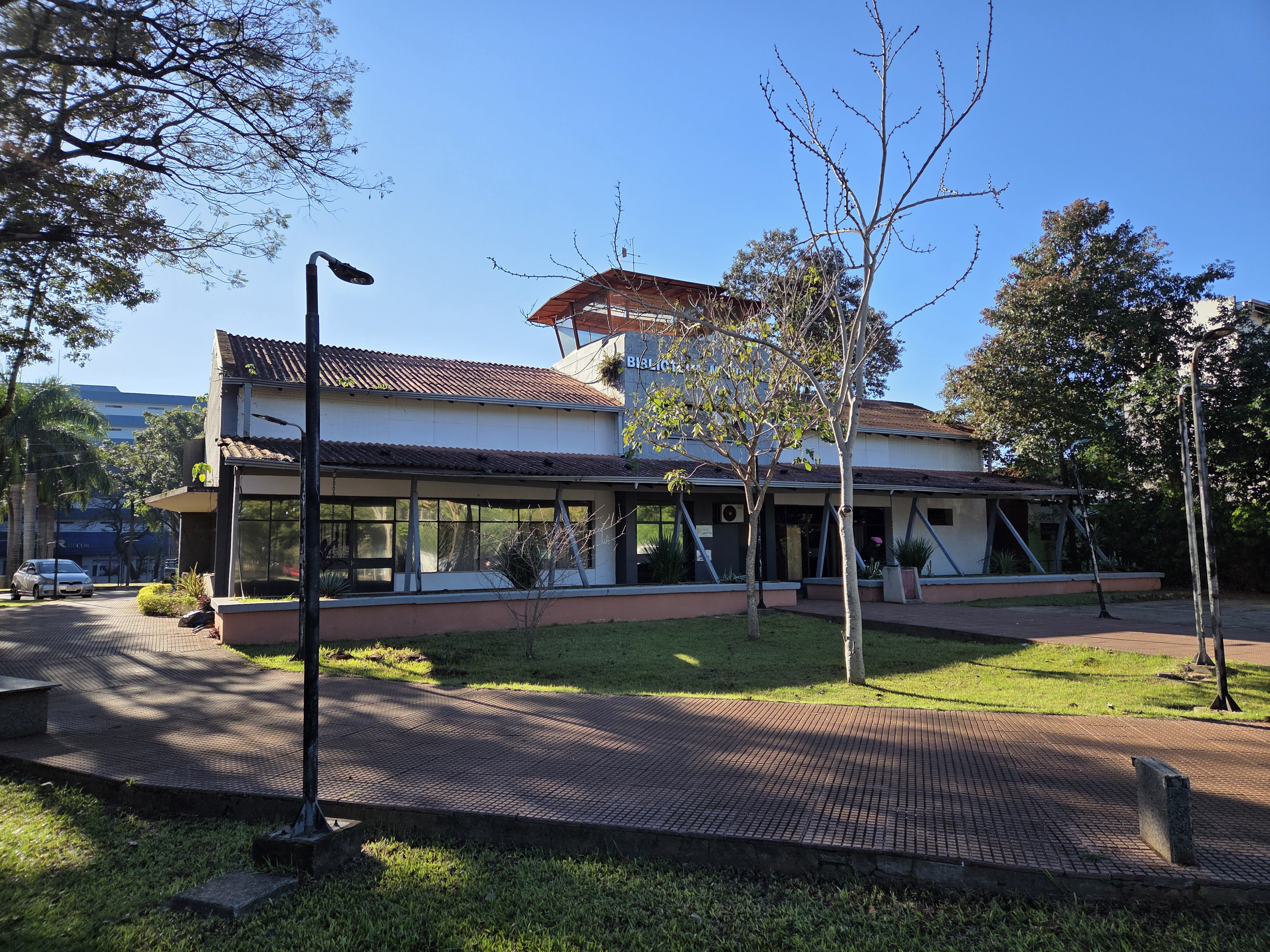
Old Alejo García Airport, now City Library

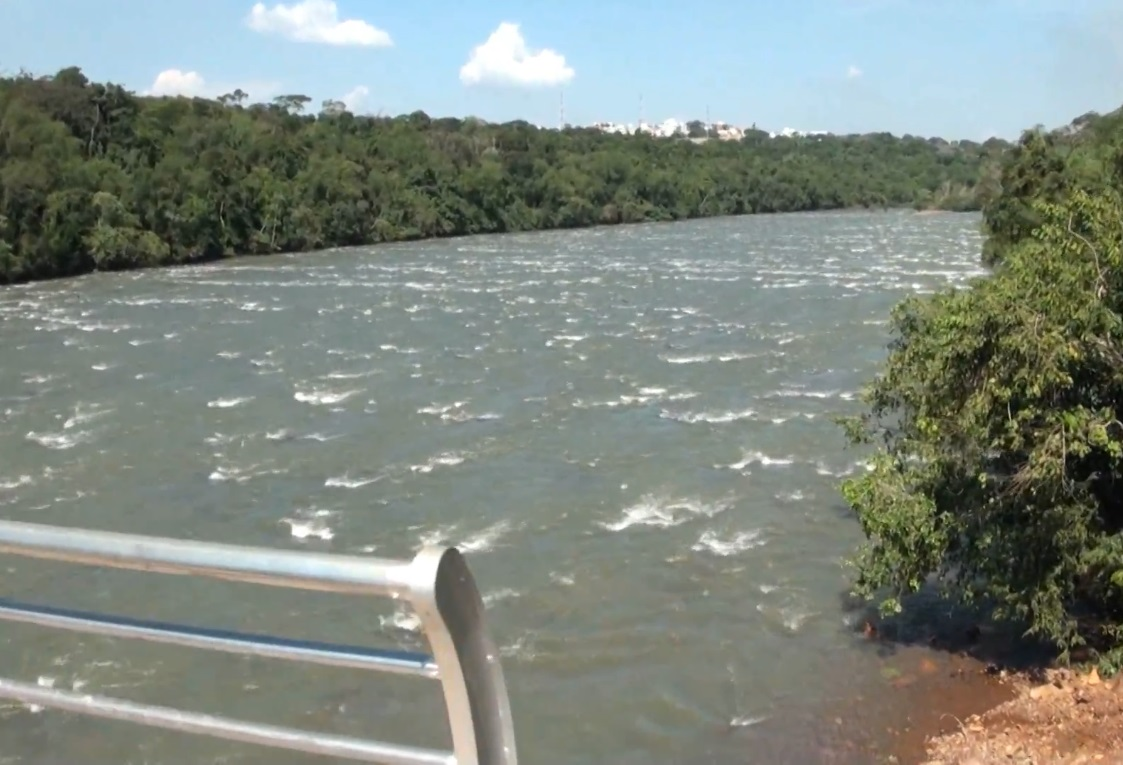
Acaray River

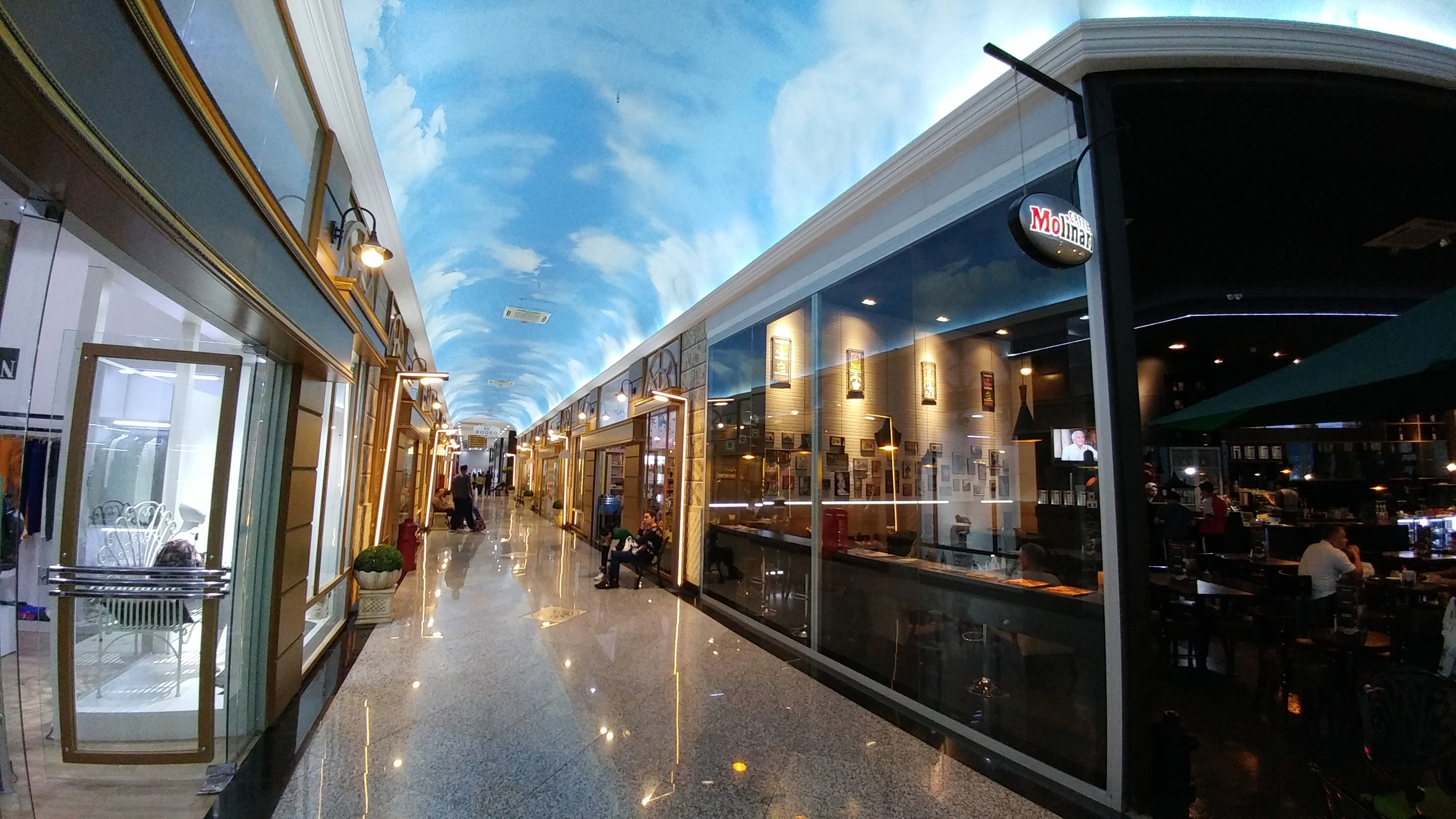
Paris Mall

== See also ==
- Punta del Este
- Saltos del Monday
- Alto Paraná Atlantic forests
