= Ecotourism in Paraguay =

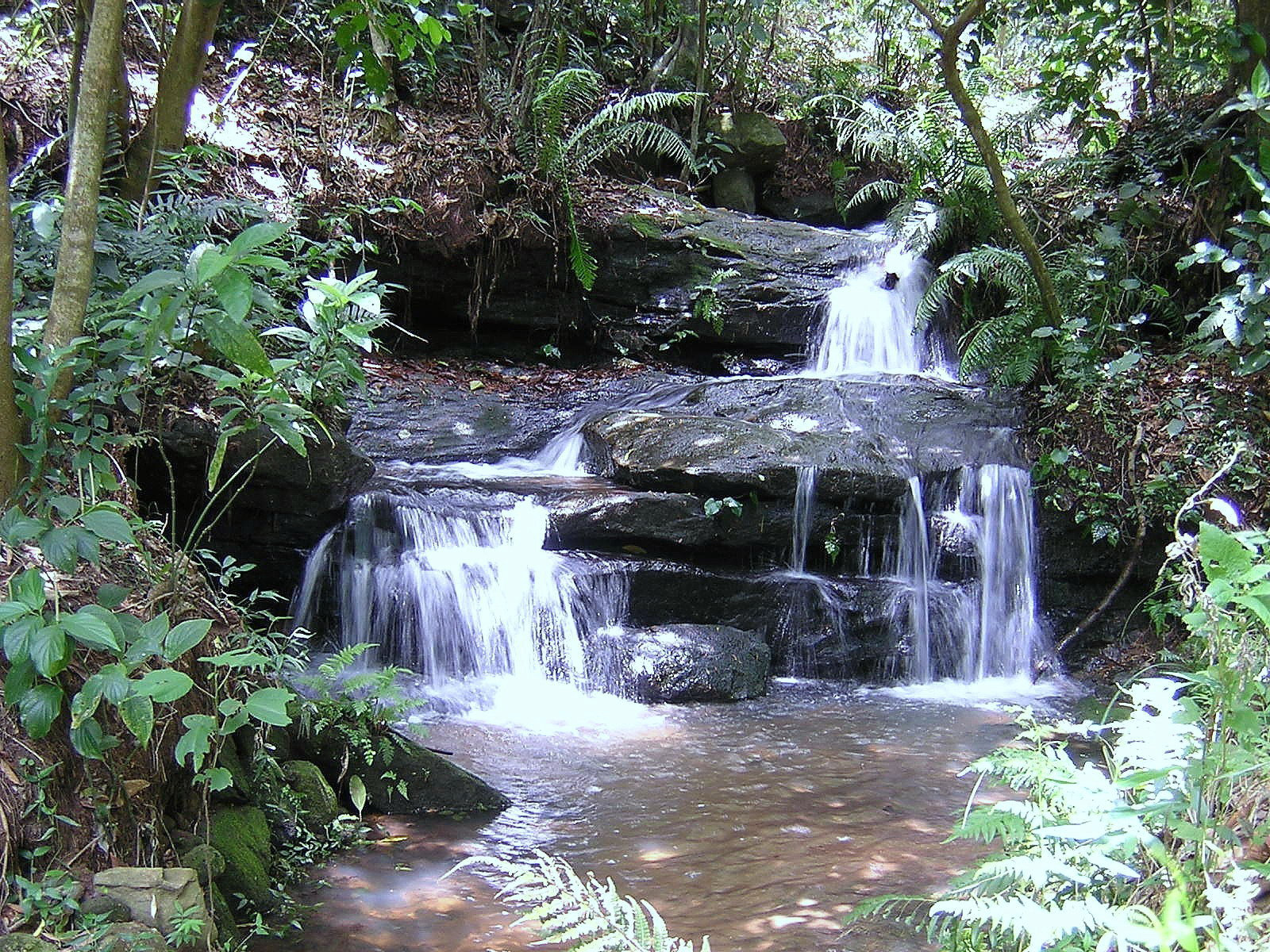
Cascade Pikysyry

Because of its biodiversity, Paraguay is an appealing destination for ecotourism. Tourists particularly come to experience the natural landscape and birdwatching.

== Flora and fauna ==
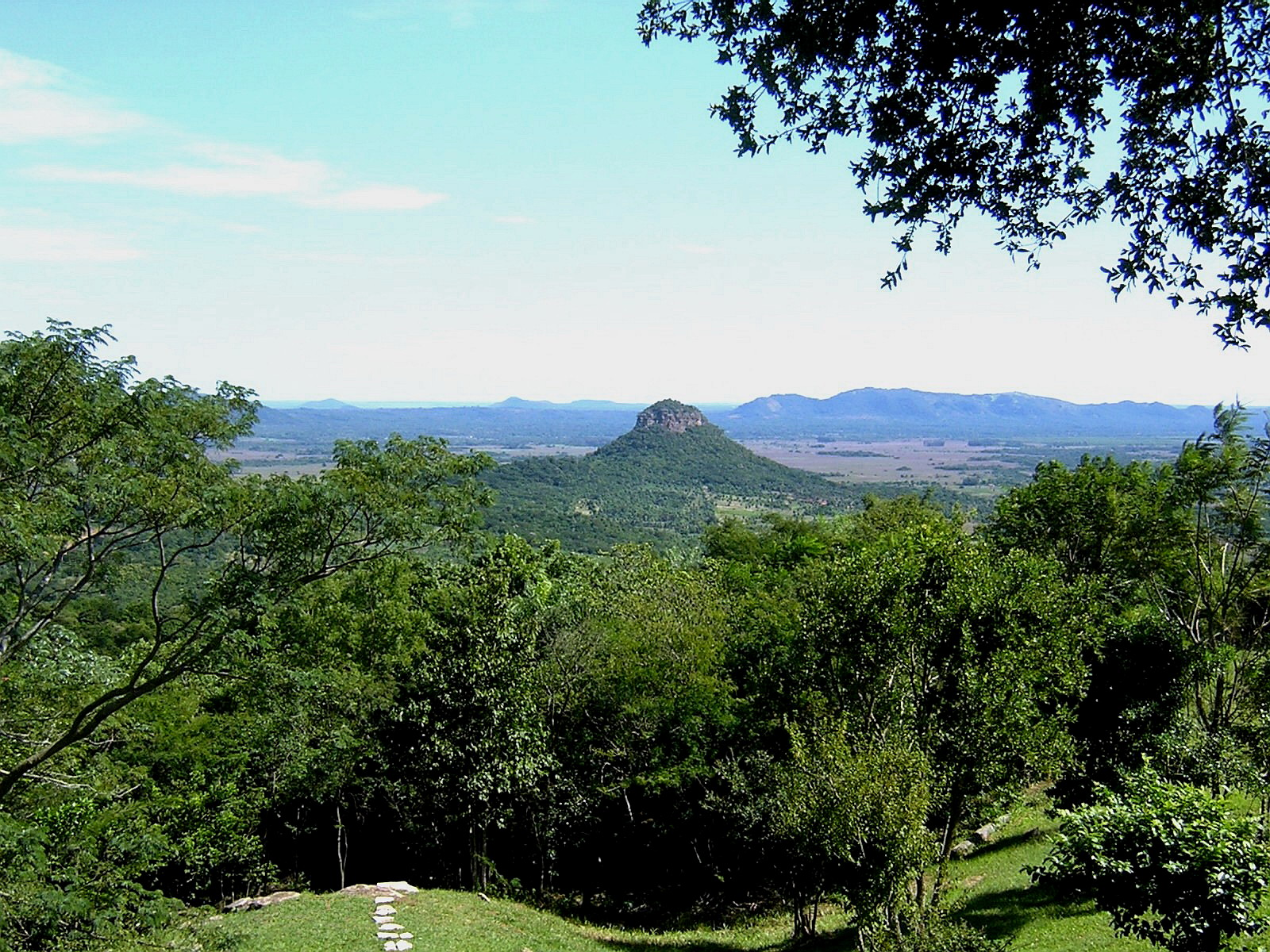

13000 species of plants have been recorded in Paraguay, including many threatened species. Deforestation represents a significant threat to the biodiversity of Paraguay. The lapacho rosado is the national tree of Paraguay. 13000 species of animals have been recorded in Paraguay, including many threatened species. It is an increasingly popular destination for birdwatching.

== National parks ==
- Caazapá National Park
- Cerro Corá National Park
- Defensores del Chaco National Park
- Estero Milagro National Park
- Médanos del Chaco National Park
- Ñacunday National Park
- Paso Bravo National Park
- Río Negro National Park
- San Pedro National Park
- San Rafael National Park (proposed)
- Serranía San Luis National Park
- Teniente Agripino Enciso National Park
- Tifunqué National Park
- Vapor Cué National Park
- Ybycuí National Park
- Ypoá National Park

== Other protected areas ==
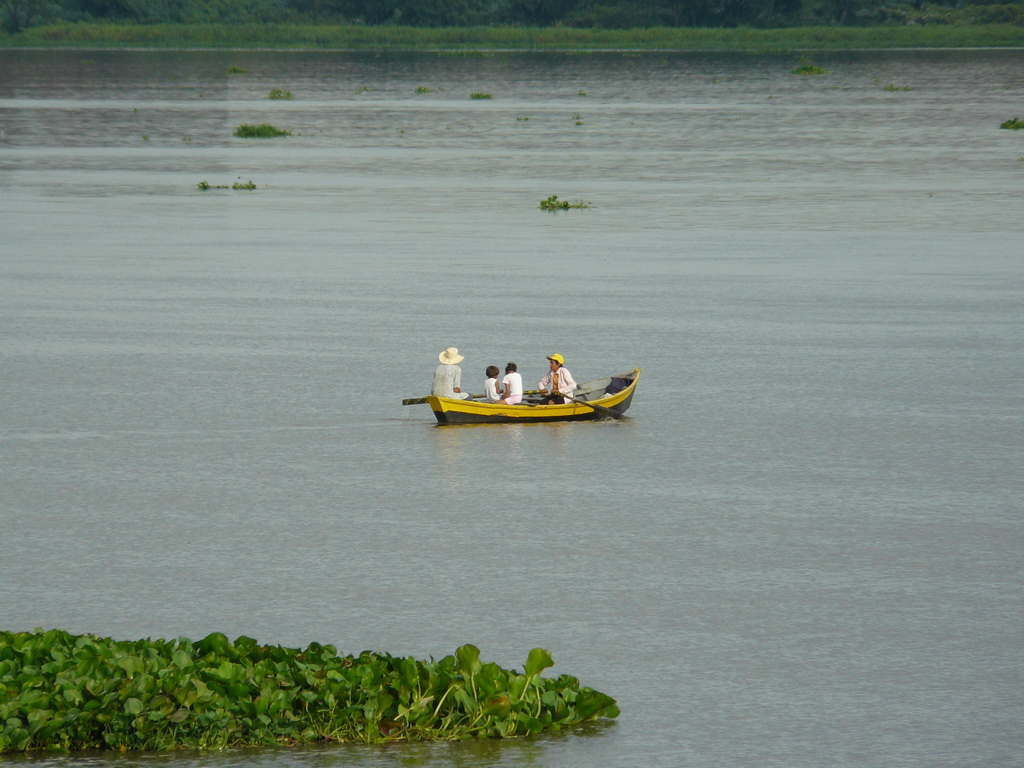

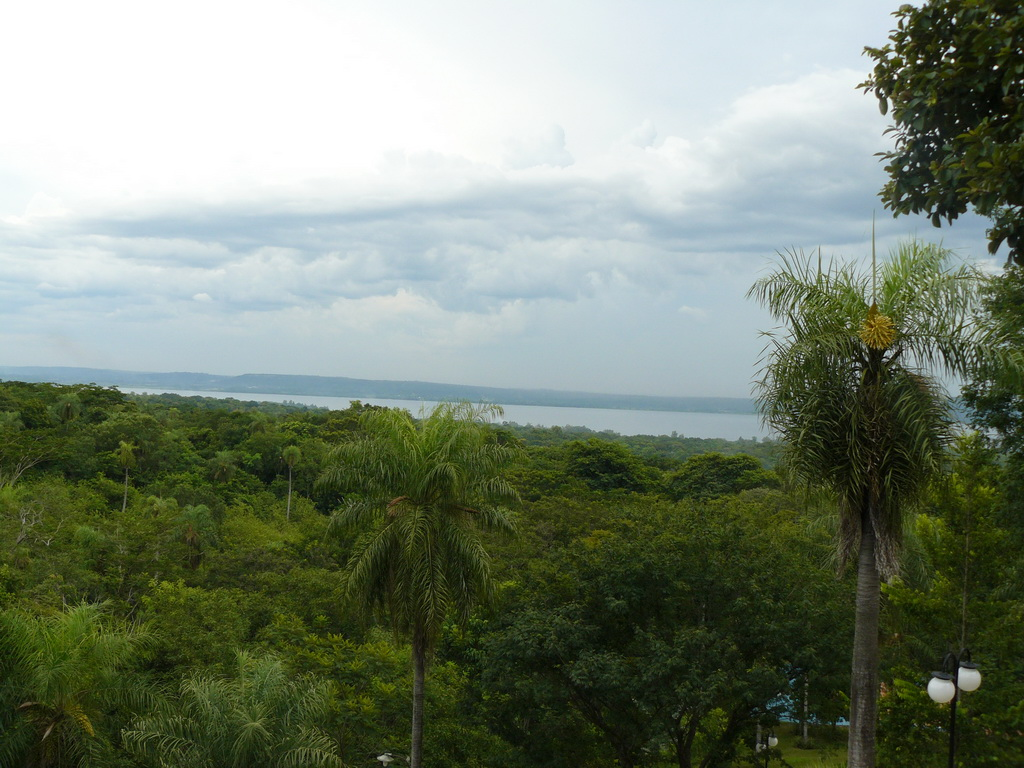
Lake Ypacarai (background)

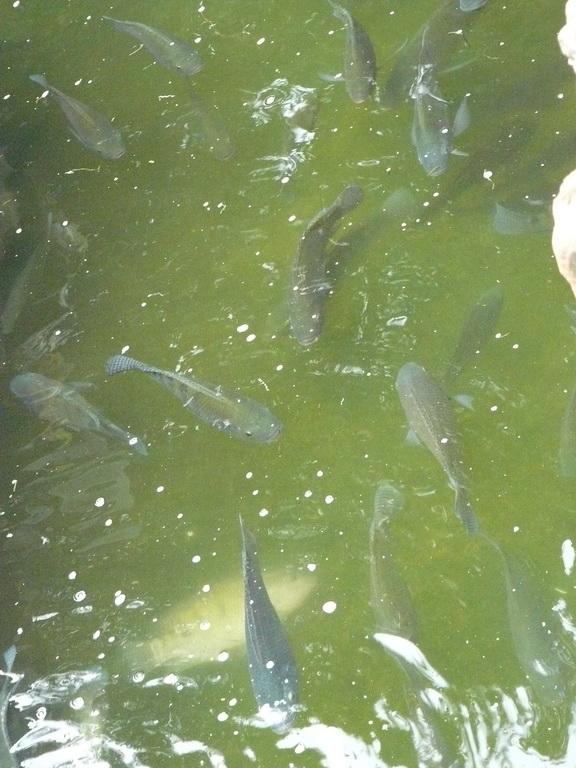

- Arroyo Blanco Nature Reserve
- Cerro Cabrera – Timané Natural Reservation
- Chovoreca Natural Monument
- Kuri`y National Reserve
- Laguna Blanca Ecological Reserve
- Mbaracayú Forest Nature Reserve
- Mbatovi Ecoreserve
- Morombí Nature Reserve
- Natural Monument Macizo Acahay
- Natural Monuments Cerros Köi and Chororí
- Pikyry Refuge
- Refugio Carapá
- Refugio Mbaracayú
- Pozo Hondo Ecological Reserve
- Reserva Itabó
- Reserva Limoy
- Reserva Natural Saltos del Guaira
- Resources Managed Ybytyruzú
- Riacho Yacaré Ecological Reserve
- Tatí Yupí Refuge
- San Rafael Reserve of Manageable Resources
- Scientific Monument Moises Bertoni
- Scientific Pirizal Reserve
- Wildlife Refuge Yacyretá
- Yabebyry Wildlife Refuge
- Ypety Nature Reserve

Tatí Yupí Refuge, Reserva Itabó, Refugio Carapá and Refugio Mbaracayú reserves are driven by the Itaipu Dam.
