= Reserva Limoy =

The biological Limoy Reserve is located in the district of Hernandarias Alto Paraná Department Paraguay, on the right bank of the river Paraná, and is one of the 8 sites for ecological reserve by the Itaipu, the largest dam in production in the world, located between Paraguay and Brazil. It is located at 160 km north of the city of Hernandarias, in the district of St. Albert. It was created in 1984 and has 14,828 hectares.

== Geography ==
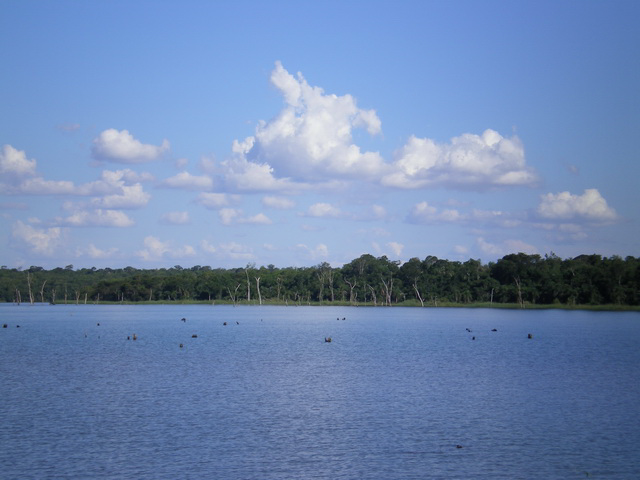
Paisaje de la Reserva Limoy

Its boundaries are: Itambey the river to the north, south Limoy river, east of the reservoir Paraná River and west perimeter road that separates the colonies and settlements adjacent (Itaipu Porâ). The rivers Azul, Abanico and Santa Teresa inside the reserve create real wildlife sanctuaries.

Its name comes from the river which makes Limoy southern boundary of the reservation. It is located in the Alto Paraná ecologic region, is slightly undulating topography, ranging from 3 to 6% slope. It soils derived from basaltic rocks.

The soils of the biological reserve Limoy, are derived from basaltic rocks, are classified as laterite and latozoles, have reddish-brown color, texture of silt and clay are usually good depth.

== Weather ==
Its climate is sub-tropical, with abundant and well distributed rainfall, ranging from 1,500 to 1,700 mm per year. The average annual temperature is 21 to 22 °C, having a marked difference in daytime and nighttime temperature in winter. The relative humidity is 70 to 80% and the prevailing winds are from the northeast and southeast.

== Flora ==
The reserve consists of biological Limoy plant associations as high forests, lowland forests and fallow. Within the high forest is distinguished stratification of five levels of vegetation. Among the dominant will include the lapacho, ybyrá pytá, cedar among others.

In the lower strata are species of the family of mirtáceas as ñangapiry, yva poroty, etc.

The tapestry has a herbaceous countless species of the families of the bromeliads, pipiráceas asteraceae, poaceae, malváceas, as well as patches of ferns tree.

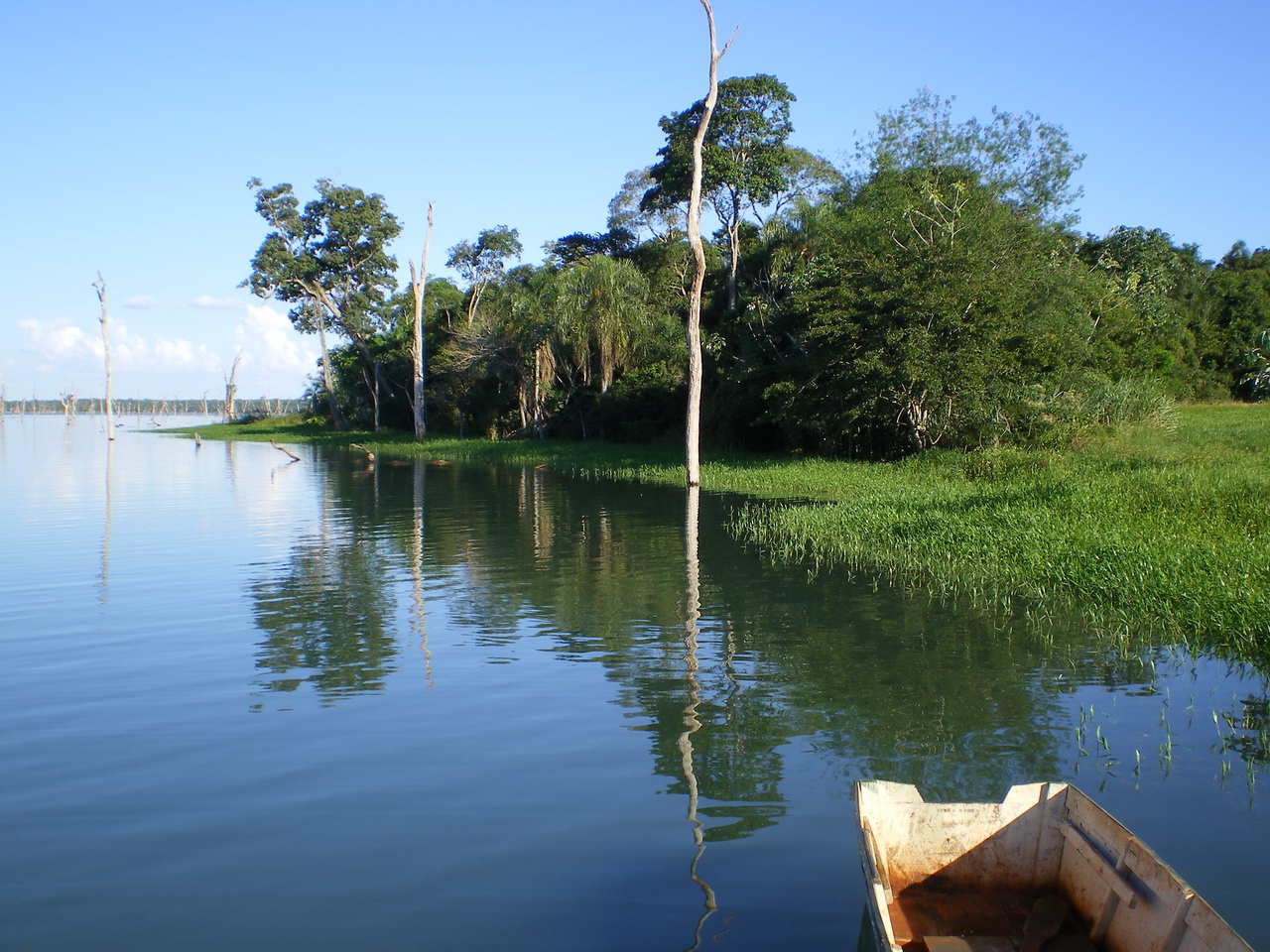
Orillas del lago en la reserva

== Animals ==
In this reserve have been classified 41 species of mammals, 234 birds and 20 reptiles.

Mammals: highlighted by its abundance taitetú, guazú, aguara'i, mboreví, kuati, as well as the (jaguareté), puma or American lion, among other species identified.

Birds: the bird is very rich which highlights species such as the royal condor, yryvú ruvichá, taguato yetapá, tingazú, yerutí, surucuá, guyra campana, mbiguá, (mboi), guyra bull, japu rai, hoko'i, among others.

Dogs are among the most common species can be found as (yarara), mboi chini), coral, yacaré, and teyú guazú.

== Tourism ==
The reserve has a panoramic viewpoint, which can be seen most of the wooded area, as well as the vast body of water formed by the dam. The combined resources of vegetation, water and topography give it invaluable.

== Itaipu Lake ==
This reserve, bordering Lake is artificially created by Itaipu. Being formed in 1982, a series of economic alternatives that are already beginning to be exploited by the 77 neighboring municipalities. The artificial lake is one of the largest in the world, with 29 million m³ and 200 km extension in a straight line. Considering the bays, inlets and length reaches 1,400 km.

The formation of the lake has not only changed the look of the geographic region. The agriculture, regional economic base, begins to cede place to tourism. Several artificial beaches were created along the banks of the lake, where he practiced all sorts of water sports.

== Area subdivision ==
According to latest techniques of management of protected areas, the biological reserve of Limoy is divided into distinct zones in order to handle them properly.

- Areas of special use: areas include reduced in size and which are essential for the administration, office accommodation, restaurant, aviation runway, and so on
- Zone extensive use: areas to which visitors access for education and recreation (and self-guided interpretive trails, paths "cross country", etc.)
- Zones intensive: consist of areas with outstanding scenery and that lend themselves to relatively dense recreational activities (camping areas, visitors' centers and scenic lookouts)
- Buffer Zones and Recovery: areas that have been severely damaged and it is mostly to areas adjacent to the surrounding populations
- Zone Core: natural areas that have received the minimum of disruption caused by man (composed of three distinct nuclei and characteristic of the place)

The reserve has a panoramic viewpoint, which can be seen most of the wooded area, as well as the vast body of water formed by the dam. The combined resources of vegetation, topography and water give it a priceless value.
