= Pikyry Refuge =

- Spanish: Refugio Biológico Pikyry
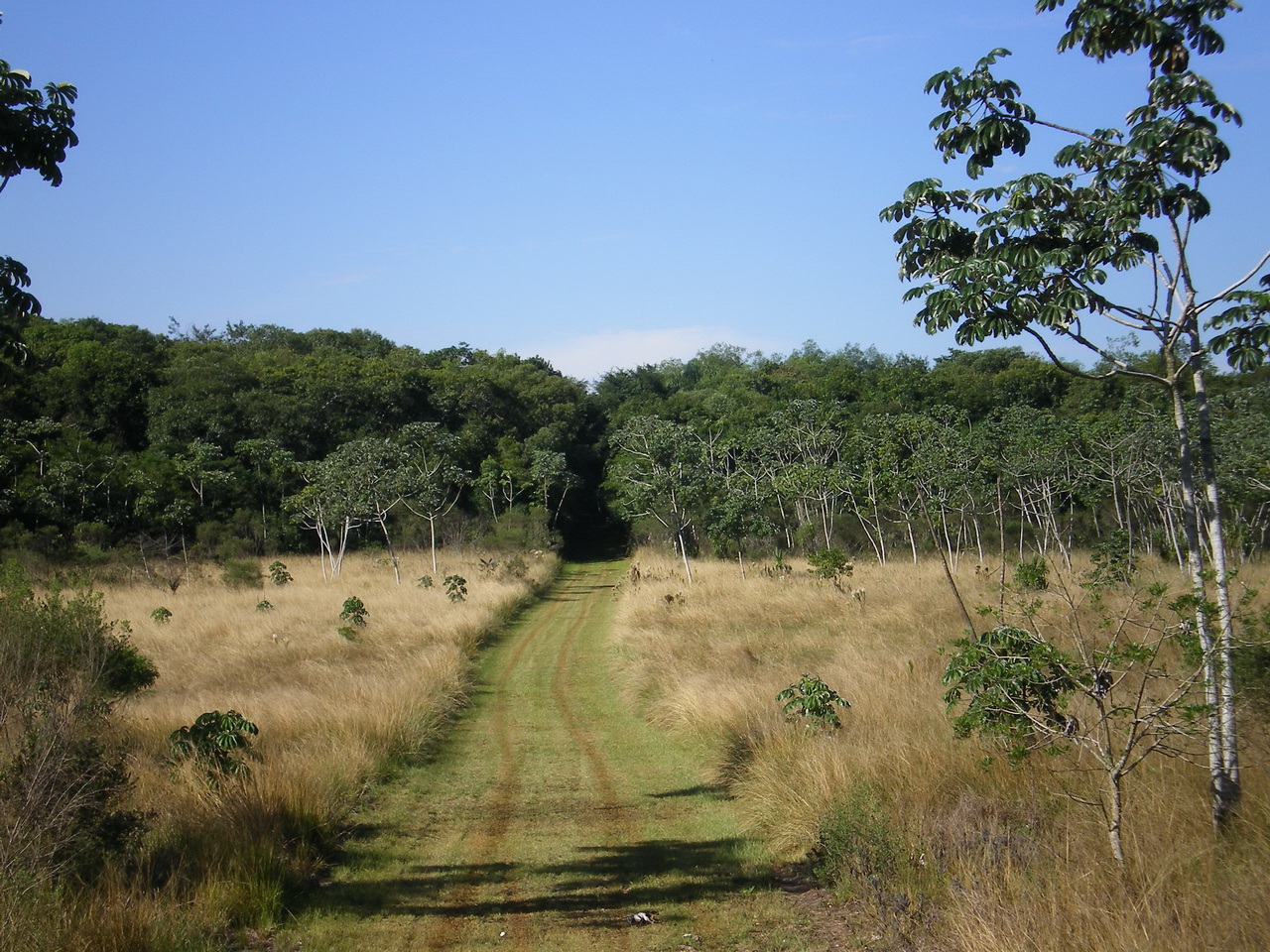
- A trail in the refuge
- Location on the banks of the Paraná River
- Location: Alto Paraná, Paraguay
- Nearest city: Santa Fé del Paraná
- Coordinates: 25.212°S 54.494°W
- Area: 1,110 ha (4.3 sq mi)

Pikyry is a biological reserve in the Alto Paraná Department of Paraguay, on the right bank of the Paraná River, and is one of the sites earmarked as 8 ecological reserve by the Itaipu dam, the largest dam in production in the world, located between Paraguay and Brazil. Located in a natural bay, Pikyry is formed by the stream and its confluence with the river Paraná, and has an area of 1,110 hectares

== Geography and climate ==
The topography of the area is flat, inclining slightly downward towards the reservoir, artificially created for the Itaipu power plant in 1982. The soils are predominantly latosoles clay. The levels of organic matter are generally high as a result of the prevailing vegetation, and is slightly acidic. There are also - though very few - hydromorphic soils belonging to the group of gley - and humic planosoles.

It is part of an area inside the Gaza Protection Reservoir in which preliminary studies have demonstrated the need for the area to be integrated into the program since it possesses unique characteristics. Conservation is very important to preserve the area from Mbaracayu Biological Reserve until Tatí Yupí Refuge.

The climate is subtropical, with abundant and well distributed rainfall, ranging from 1,500 to 1,700 millimeters per year. The average annual temperature is 21 to 22 °C, having a marked difference in daytime and nighttime temperature in winter. The relative humidity is 70 to 80% and the prevailing winds are the northeast and southeast, encouraging and pleasant conditions of the place.

== Animals and plants ==
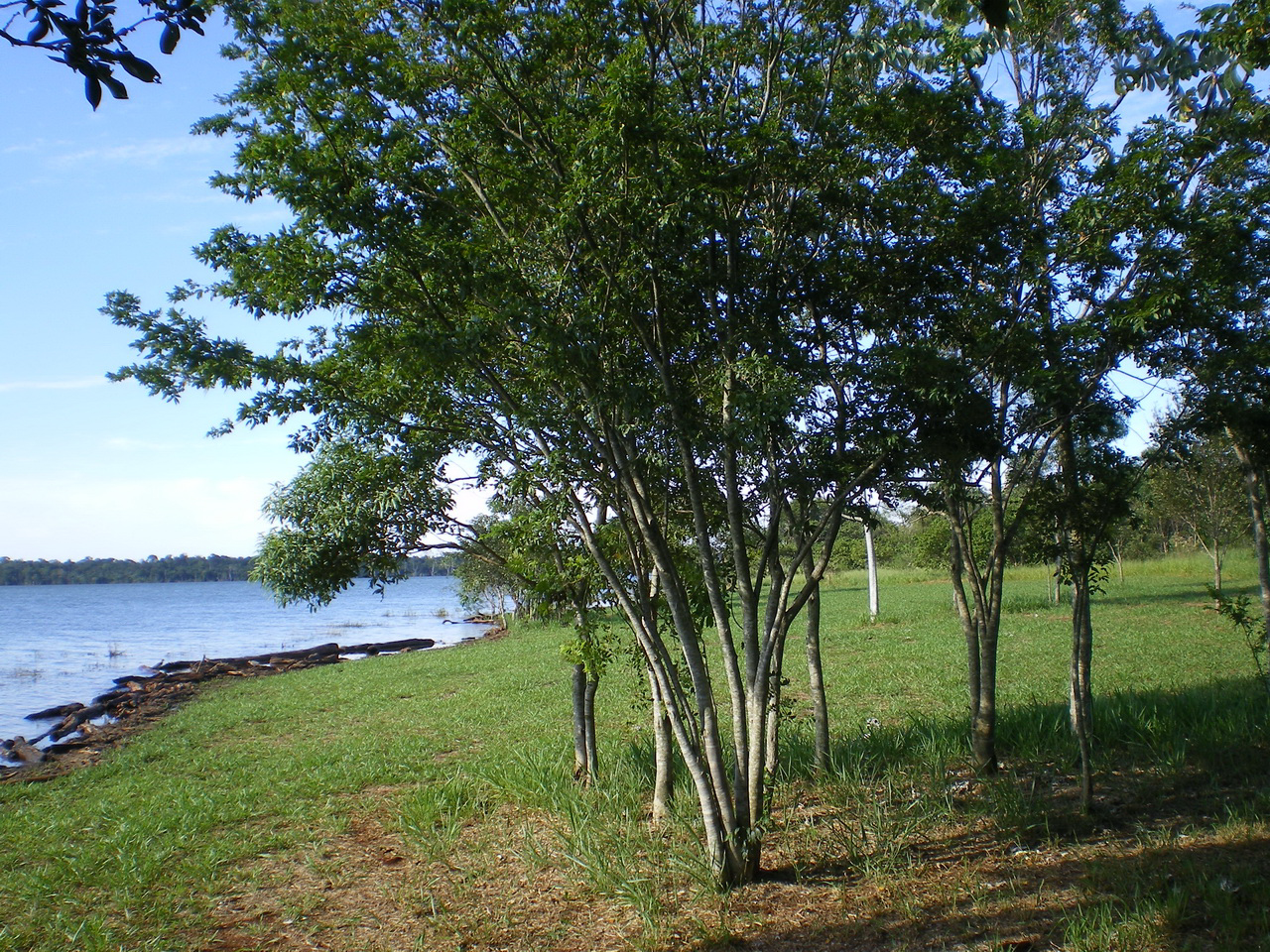
Shorline along the lake

The vegetation, dominated by species such as Tabebuia, Cedrela fissilis, Patagonula American among others. Besides abundant species Lauraceae and undergrowth populated with species like Piperaceae, Bromeliaceae, Rubiaceae pteridophytes, Poaceae among others. There exists, 300 metres within the preserve's border, a variety of Arecaceae, Trithrinax brasiliensis, the only recorded example in this part of Paraguay.

There are several species of mammals, birds and reptiles for example: capybara (Hydrochaeris hydrochaeris), monkey (Cebus apella), kuatí ( Nasua nasua), among others.

== Area subdivision ==
The biological reserve of Pikyry is divided into distinct zones in order to handle them properly.

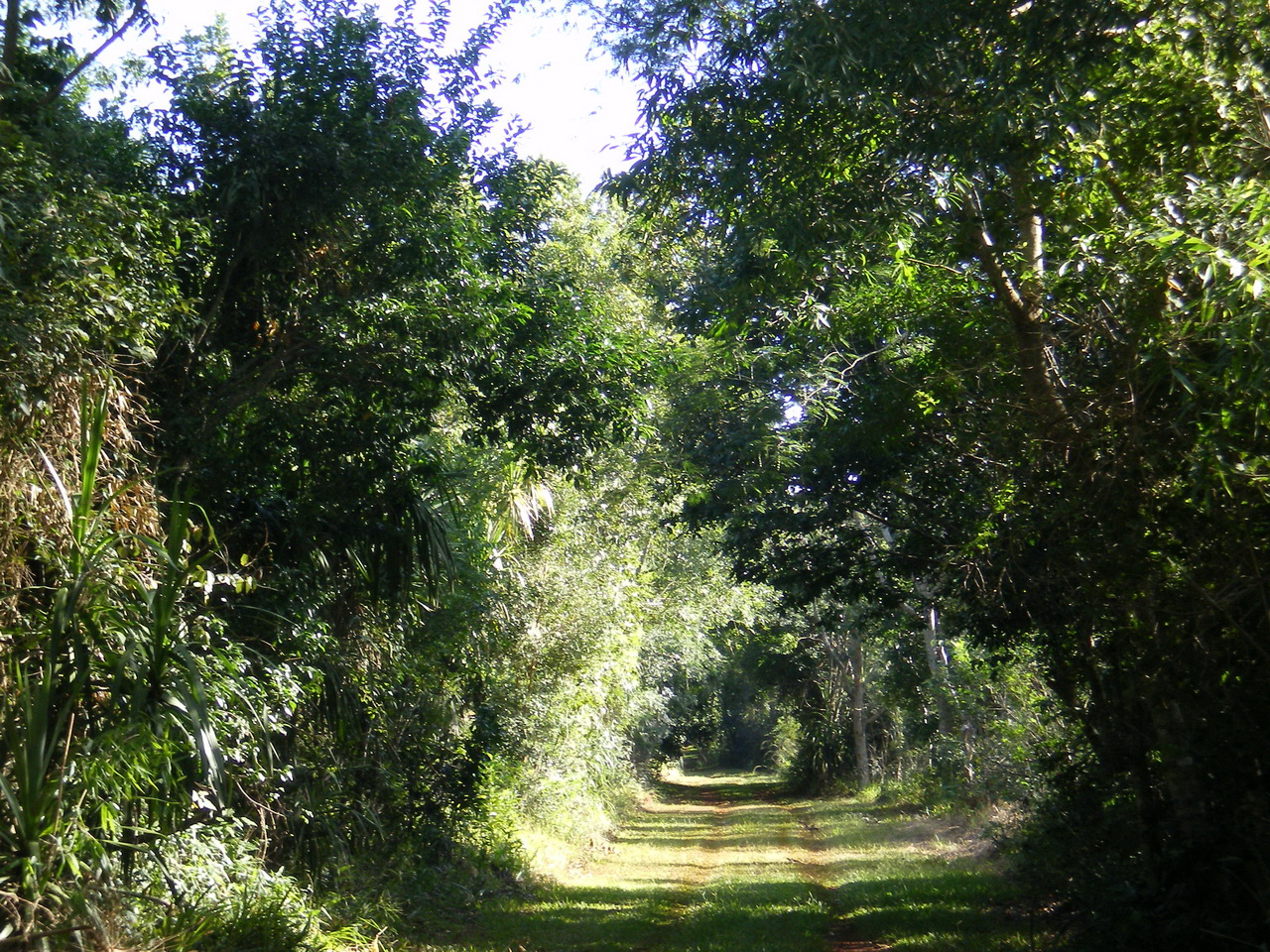
Trail leading into the refuge

- Areas of special use: areas essential for the administration, office accommodation, restaurant, aviation runway, and so on
- Zones extensive use: areas which visitors access for education and recreation
- Zones intensive: areas with outstanding scenery which can support large numbers of visitors and recreational activities (camping areas, visitors' centers and scenic lookouts)
- Buffer Zones and Recovery: areas that have been severely damaged, largely on the border of the preserve near heavily populated areas
- Zone Core: natural areas that have received the minimum of disruption caused by man (with three distinct nuclei and characteristic of the place)

The reserve has a panoramic viewpoint, which can be seen most of the wooded area, as well as the vast body of water formed by the dam. The combined resources of vegetation, water and topography give it inestimable value.
