= Reserva Itabó =

The Itabo Biological Reserve is located in the district of Hernandarias, Alto Paraná Department, Paraguay, on the right bank of the river Paraná, and is one of the 8 as sites for ecological reserve by the Itaipu dam, the largest dam in production in the world, located between Paraguay and Brazil. It is located at 80 km north of the city of Hernandarias. Their access routes are the backbone 1 and 2. It has an area of 15,208.

== Geography ==
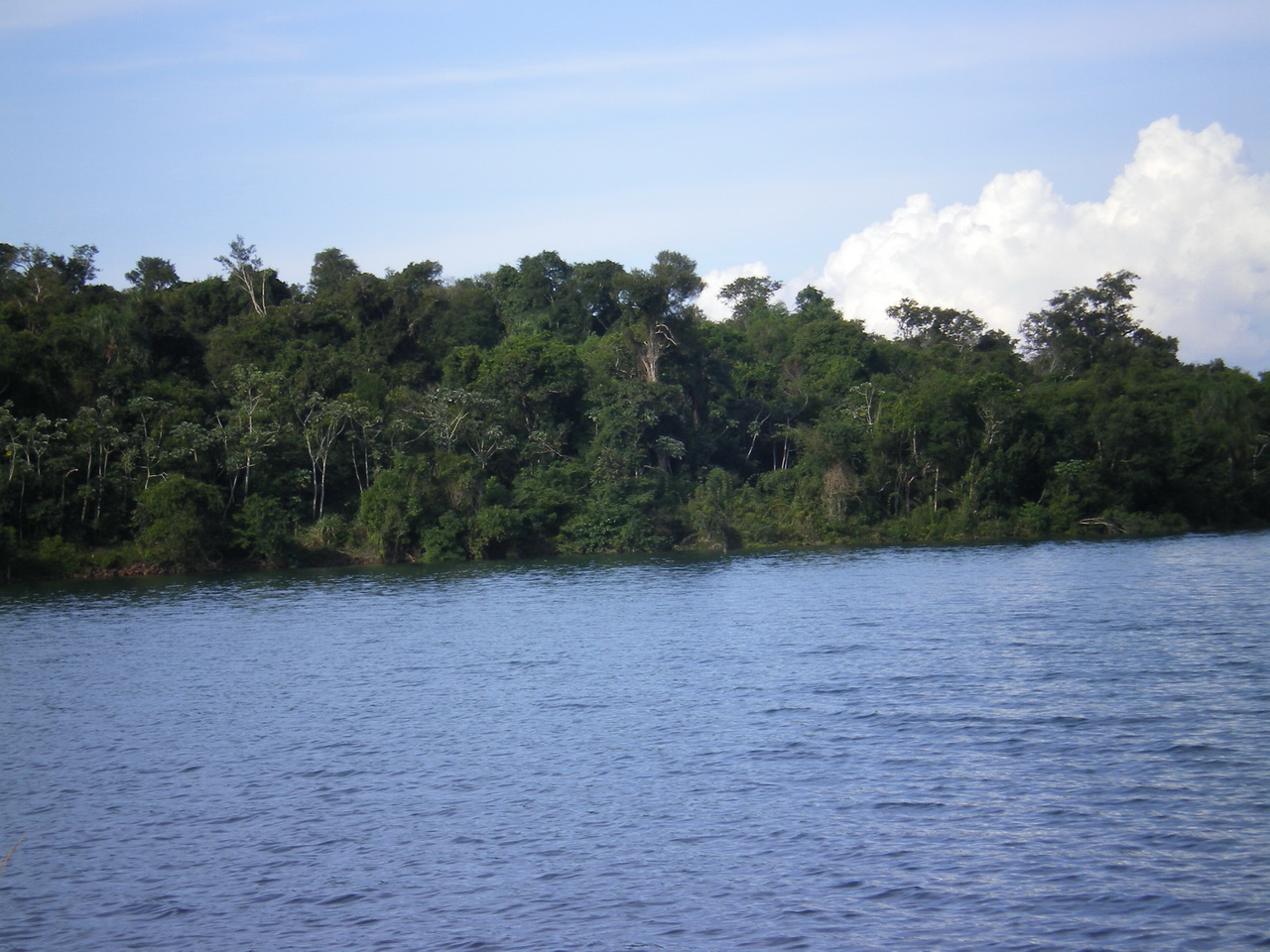
Reserva Itabó

It has a slightly undulating topography. The river Itabo Reserve crosses from west to east with their two arms, Itabo North and South and some tributaries.

Its boundaries are: north to the Cologne Gral. Diaz, south establishing livestock Loma Porá, the Cologne to the east and west Pikyry Colonies Gleba 2 and Gleba 3.

The soils of the biological reserve Itabo, are derived from basaltic rocks. They are classified as laterite and latozoles, have reddish-brown colour, texture of silt and clay are usually good depth.

== Climate ==
Its climate is subtropical, with abundant and well distributed rainfall, ranging from 1500 to 1700 mm annually. The average annual temperature is 21 to 22 °C, having a marked difference in daytime and nighttime temperature in winter. The relative humidity is 70 to 80% and the prevailing winds are from the northeast and southeast.

== Animals and plants ==
The high forests are the kind of dominant vegetation of the area found a minimum amount of lowland forests, pastures and fallow implanted. There is abundant presence of forest species such as: lapacho, ybyrá pytá, cedar, cancharana, petereby, guatambú, peroba incense, curupay, ybyraró, among others. In the lower strata plants are species of the family Myrtaceae, as ñangapiry, Guava, yva poroitý, and so on.

The tapestry has countless herbaceous species of the family bromeliads, as well as tree ferns.

We have classified 40 species of mammals, 250 bird species and 20 species of reptiles.

Stress for its abundance: taitetú, mboreví, guazú, spirits' i, akuti sa'yjú, coati among other listed species.

Among the birds we can cite the heron boyer, hoke guazú, mbiguá, duck braga, osprey, yryvú ruvichá, and tingazú.

Among the reptiles were observed yarara, Coral snake, lies.

== Area subdivision ==
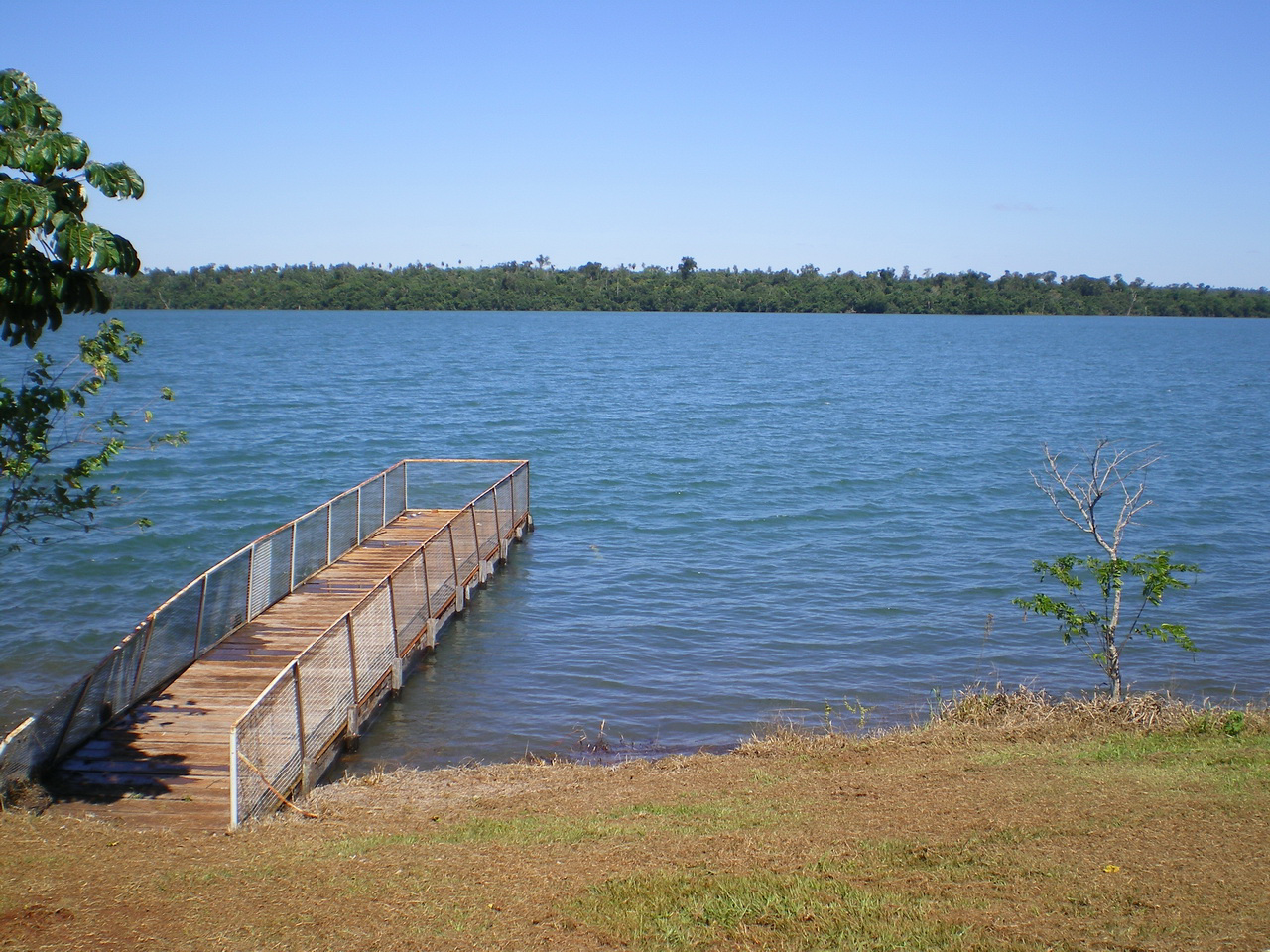
Reserva Itabó

According to latest techniques of management of protected areas, the biological reserve of Itabo is divided into distinct zones in order to handle them properly.

- Areas of special use: areas include reduced in size and which are essential for the administration, office accommodation, restaurant, aviation runway, and so on
- Zone extensive use: areas to which visitors access for education and recreation (and self-guided interpretive trails, paths "cross country", etc.)
- Zones intensive: consist of areas with outstanding scenery and that lend themselves to relatively dense recreational activities (camping areas, visitors' centers and scenic lookouts)
- Buffer Zones and Recovery: areas that have been severely damaged and it is mostly to areas adjacent to the surrounding populations
- Zone Core: natural areas that have received the minimum of disruption caused by man (comprising three distinct nuclei and characteristic of the place)

The reserve has a panoramic viewpoint, which can be seen most of the wooded area, as well as the vast body of water formed by the dam. The combined resources of vegetation, topography and water give it a priceless
