= Refugio Carapá =

Biological reserve in Canindeyú, Paraguay

Refugio Carapá is a biological reserve in the Department of Canindeyú, Paraguay, on the right bank of the Paraná River. It is one of eight sites earmarked as an ecological reserve near the Itaipu Dam, one of the largest dams in the world, located between Paraguay and Brazil. The reserve is 260 km (160 mi) north of the Ciudad del Este. It was founded in 1984 and is 3,250 hectares (8,000 acres).

== Geography ==
Refugio Carapá is surrounded by mountains and land with very steep slopes. The soils are latosol, textured red clay.

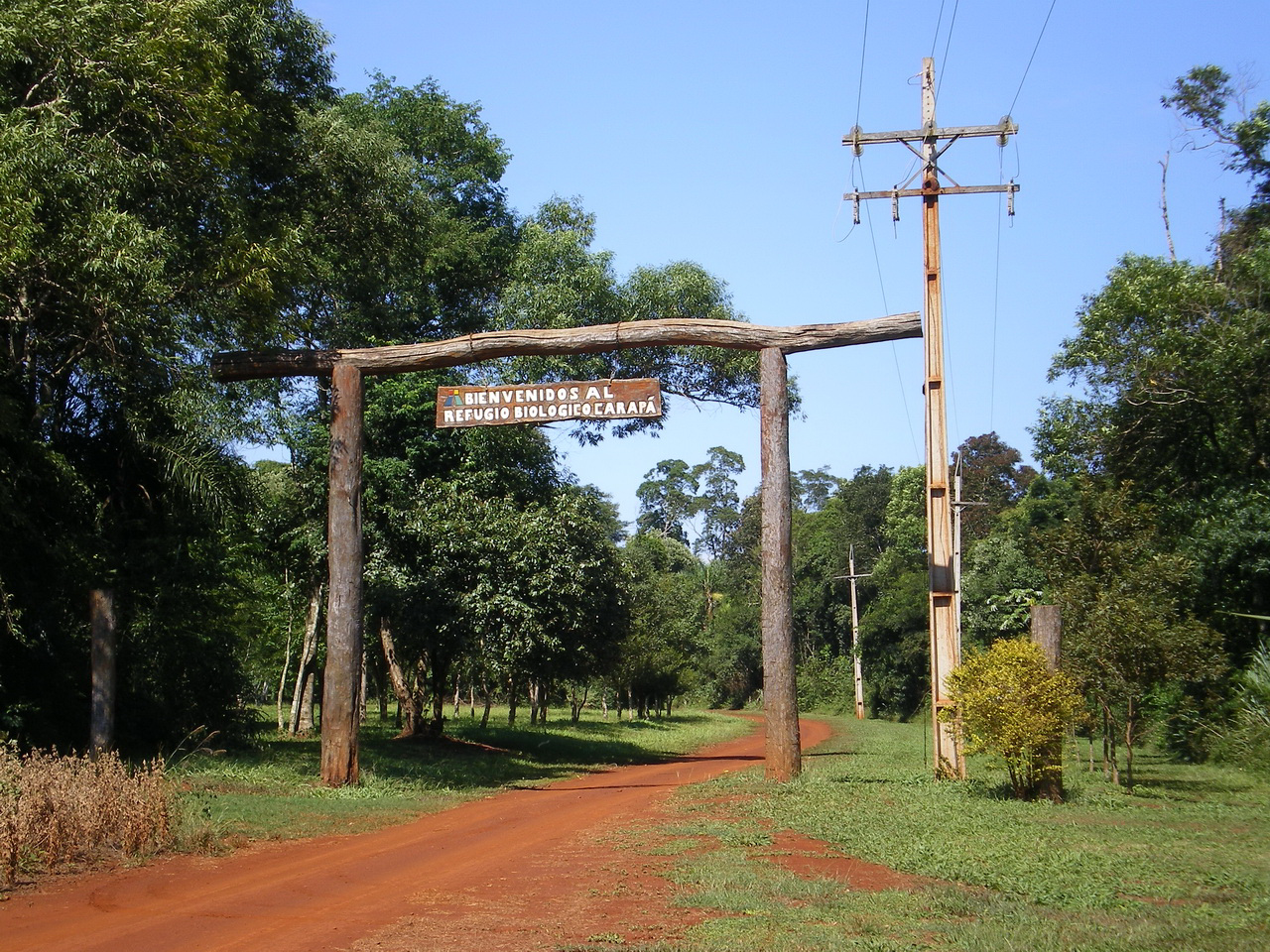
Entrada al Refugio

== Weather ==
The weather is humid and warm, typical of the sub mesothermal humid tropics. Annual precipitation of 1,300 mm (51 in). The drainage basin of the Carapá River is composed of several tributaries that arise in different parts of the Department of Canindeyu in Paraguay.

== Animals and plants ==
The vegetation of the refuge is composed of associations of forest high, low forest, swamps, high camp, camp low, primitive forest and forest near the river. The dominant species are composed of Tabebuia, Peltophorum dubium, and Cedrela fissilis.

Of the animal species recorded, most are in the range of endangered. There are also less threatened species, such as the neotropical otter (Lontra longicaudis) and collared peccary. Among the carnivores, Felis has experienced territorial displacement. Of all the species recorded in the area of Itaipu dam, 61.4% belong to the area of the Carapá River.

== Infrastructure and use of refuge ==
The refuge has a structure where researchers and technicians live full-time.

Objectives of the refuge include:

- Study of the environmental situation in the drainage basin of the Carapá River
- Study of mammals, birds, and fish
- Study of plants
- Study of physical and chemical conditions of water
- Study of climatic conditions
- Soil studies
- Social aspects
- Analysis and classification of the ecosystem for its operating framework within conservation

== Itaipu Lake ==
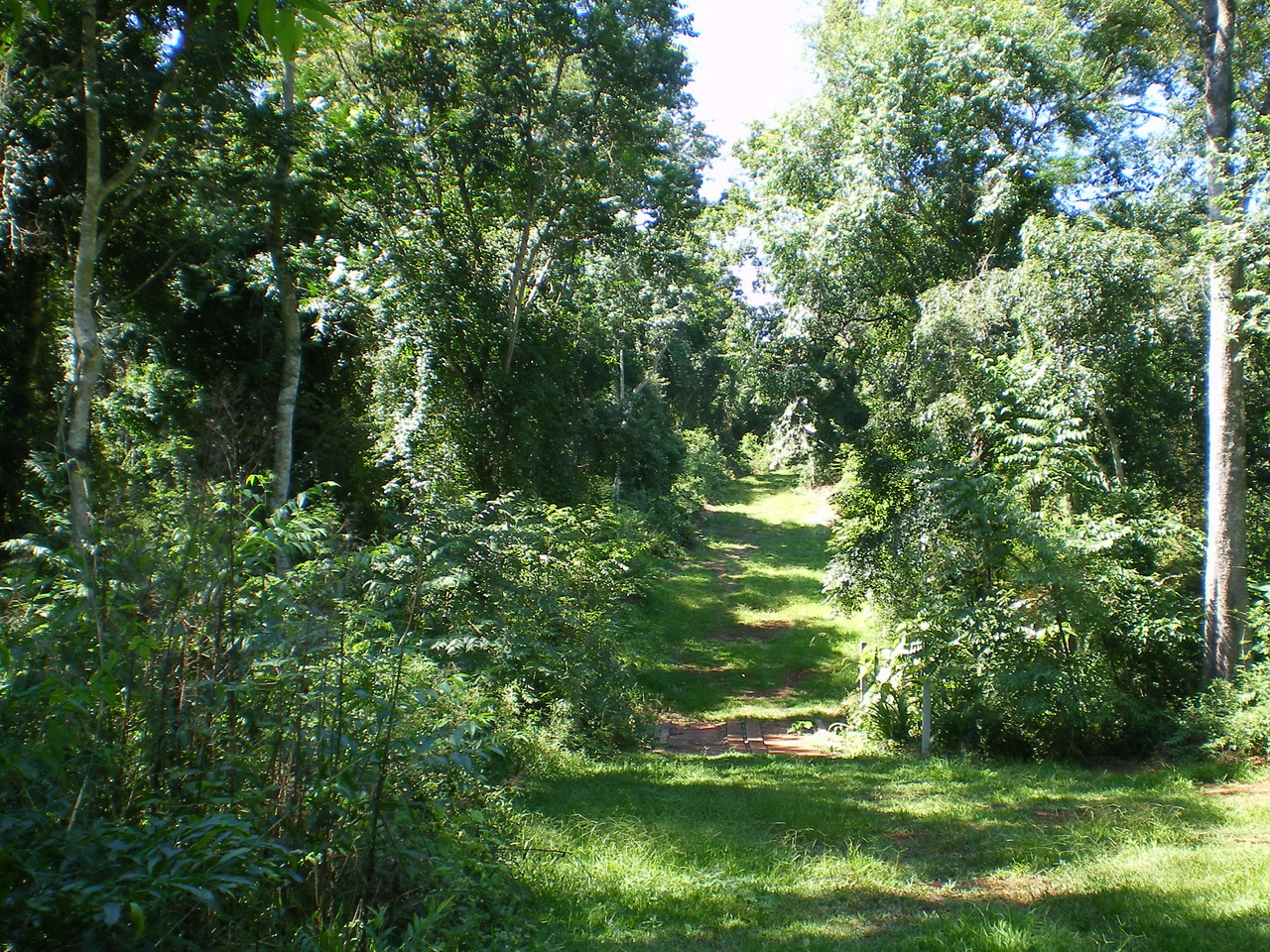
Carapá

This reserve bordering the lake was artificially created by Itaipu in 1982. A series of economic initiatives are beginning to be exploited by the 77 neighboring municipalities. The artificial lake is one of the largest in the world, with 29 million m^{3} (1.0 billion cu ft) and 200 km (120 mi) extension in a straight line. Including the bays and inlets, it extends 1,400 km (870 mi).

The formation of the lake has not only changed the look of the geographic region. Agriculture, the regional economic base, is being replaced by tourism. Several artificial beaches were created along the banks of the lake, where people participate in water sports.

== Area divisions ==
Refugio Carapá is divided into distinct zones following techniques for managing protected areas.

- Areas of special use: essential for administration, including offices, accommodation, restaurants, aviation runway, and so on. They are reduced in size.
- Extensive use zone: areas where visitors access education, recreation, and self-guided interpretive trails.
- Intensive zones: these have outstanding scenery and lend themselves to relatively dense recreational activities, such as camping areas, visitors' centers, and scenic lookouts.
- Buffer zones and recovery: areas that have been severely damaged, mostly those adjacent to the surrounding populations.
- Core zone: natural areas that have received a minimum of human disruption, with three distinct nuclei, and characteristic of the place.

The reserve has a panoramic viewpoint, from which can be seen most of the wooded area, as well as the vast body of water formed by the dam.
