= Refugio Mbaracayú =

Binational reserve in Paraguay and Brazil

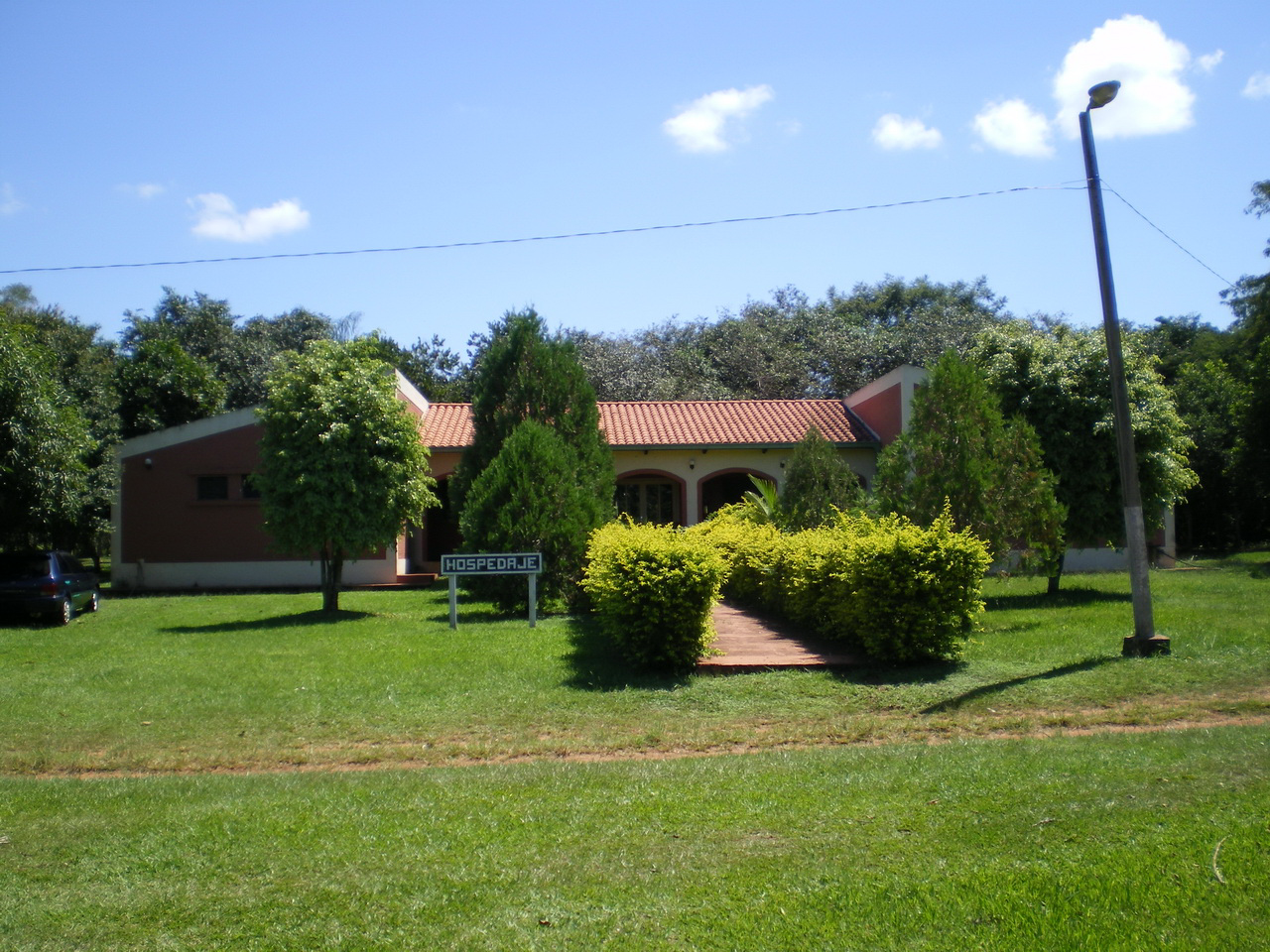
Vista del parque y casco principal

The Mbaracayú (Maracaju) Biological Sanctuary is a binational reserve, located on the border between Paraguay and Brazil. It is one of the sites earmarked as ecological reserve by Itaipu Binacional, which operates the Itaipu Dam. Itaipu is the largest dam in production in the world, located between Paraguay and Brazil. It was founded in 1984 and is located at 300 km north of the city of Hernandarias. It has 1,356 ha. The refuge is managed by these two countries.

The creation of the sanctuary was a solution to the old problem of boundaries between Brazil and Paraguay. Itaipu Binacional created a strip of environmental protection at the border between the cities of Mundo Novo (Brazil) and Salto del Guairá (Paraguay). Before the creation of the Refuge, the area was devoid of vegetation; in less than ten years of intensive work of environmental recovery, the area has been completely reforested. This is one of the geographic areas in which Brazilians and Paraguayans have been able to resolve territorial conflicts.

== Geography ==
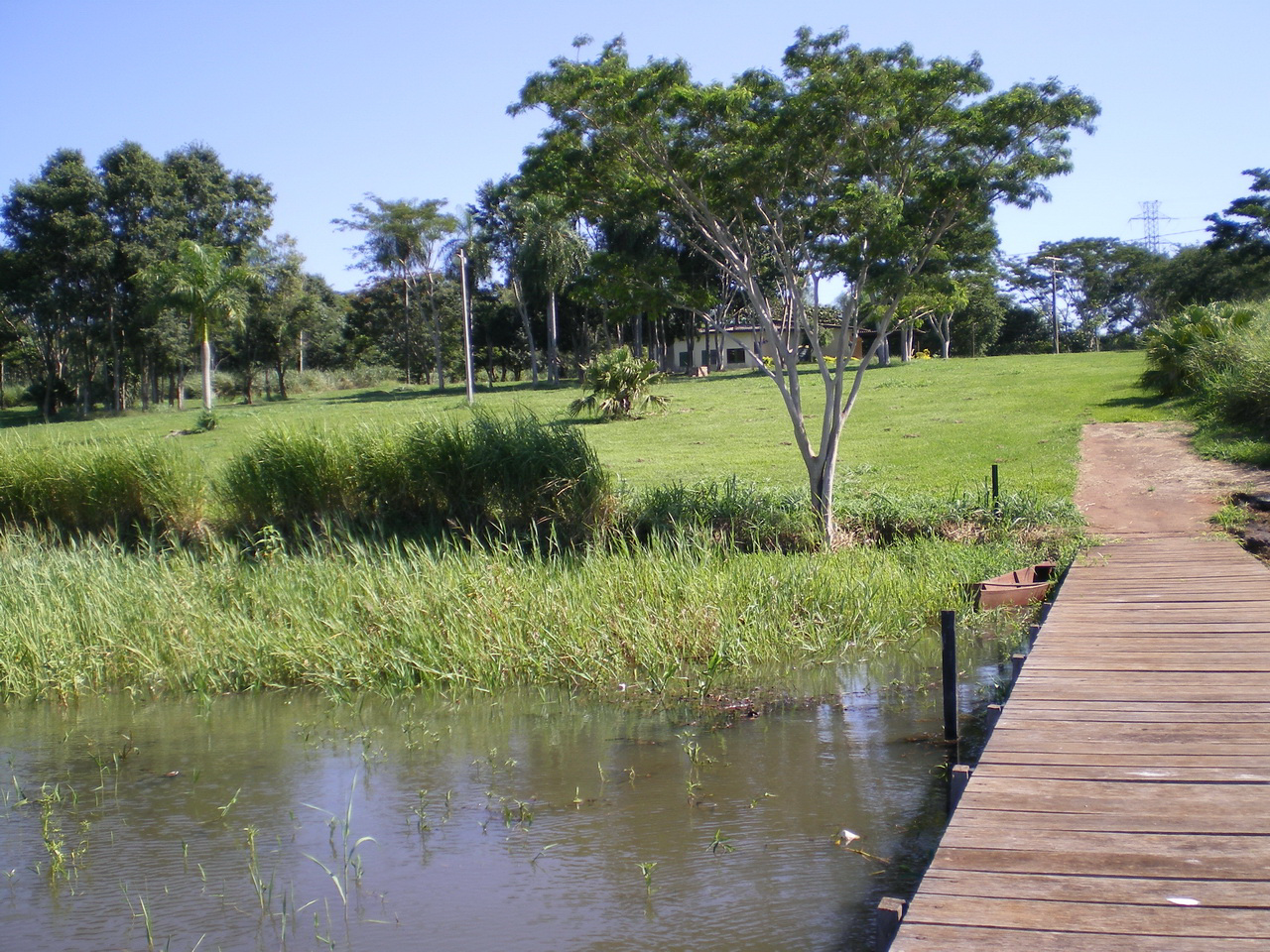
Sendero paradisiaco

The sanctuary comprises a series of low hills with numerous springs and streams in their valleys, plus low-lying areas with wetlands and estuaries toward the river Parana. Natural environmental conditions have been significantly altered. At other times were covered with high forests that were felled for land use in livestock production, therefore 85% of its area is now pasture. The remaining 15% is wetlands, small isolated areas of remnant forests, riparian forests or in galleries and "tacuarales".

The soil is classified mostly as latosoles and latosol sandy, and the sandy texture is easily eroded. In some places the texture is predominately arene - clay. In low-lying areas there are hydromorphic soils.

== Animals and Plants ==
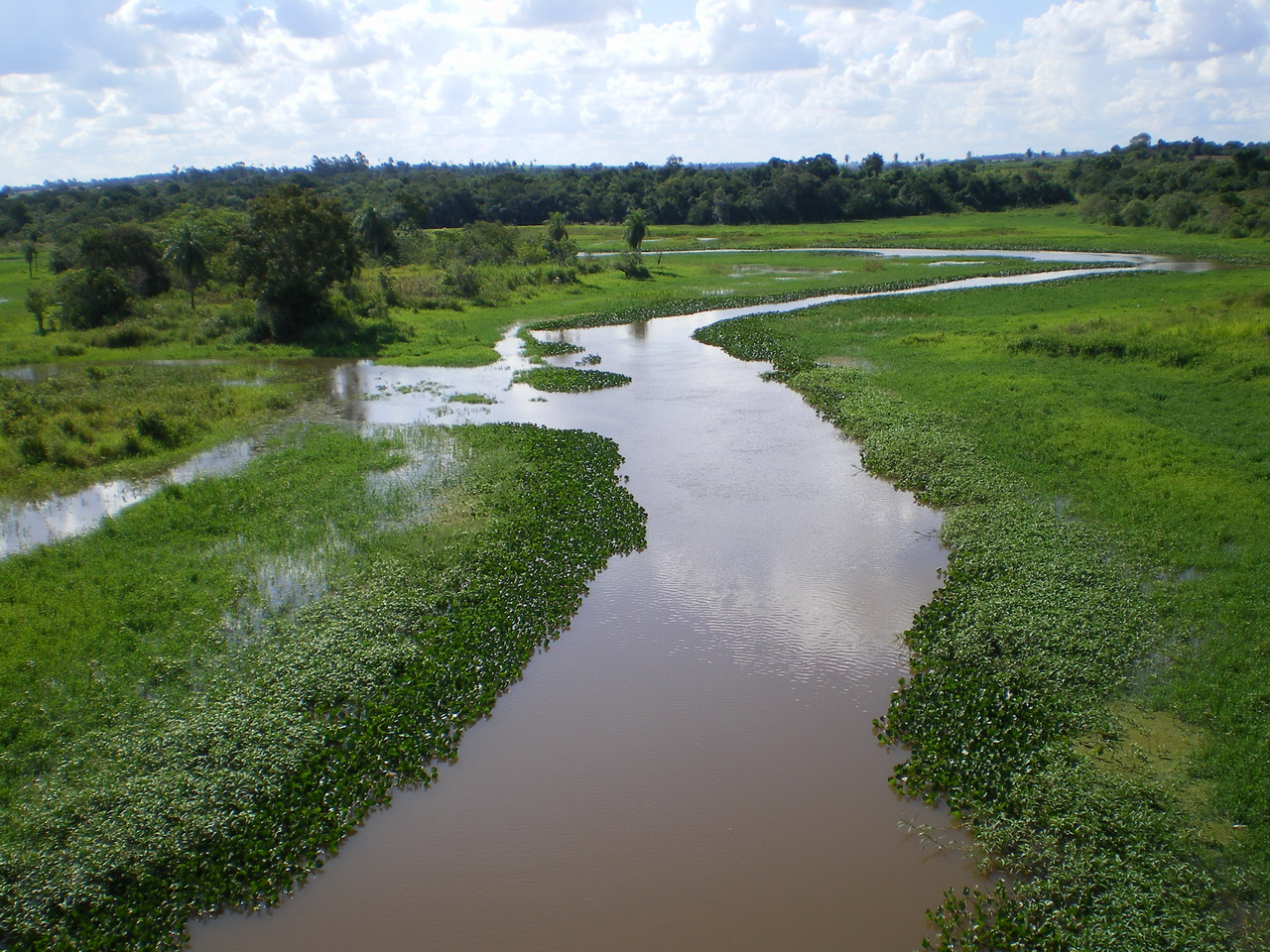
Exuberante naturaleza

Ecosystems in the Refuge create the ideal conditions for animal life, among which are: monkey (Cebus apella), kuatí (Nasua nasua), fox (Crab-eating fox), on wetlands are: capybara (Hydrochaeris), otter (Lutra) and mentioned in special form of swamp deer to (Blastocerus dichotomus), animal in serious danger of extinction, this deer appears frequently in the area, especially on the banks of streams, in almost all notándose opportunities their presence as a couple.

The area is grassland habitat suitable for different species of birds, cats and even small rodents that can be seen frequently. This area is where they originate large fires at certain times of year. The pasture mentioned refers to Panicum maximum by 90%.

In this Refuge are identified over 250 species of birds, highlighting three new records for Paraguay: Anhima cornuta, Picummus albosquammatus and Schistochlamys melanopis.

In areas with much humidity plant species are observed as:Eichornia azurea Equisetum giganteum Nephelea setosa, among others.

== Itaipu Lake ==
This refuge is bordering Lake artificially created to enter into operation the plant of Itaipu. Being formed in 1982, a series of economic alternatives that are already beginning to be exploited by the 77 neighboring municipalities. The artificial lake is one of the largest in the world, with 29 million m³ and 200 km extension in a straight line. Considering the bays and inlets the shorelength reaches 1,400 km.

The formation of the lake has not only changed the look of the geographic region. The agriculture, regional economic base, begins to cede place to tourism. Several artificial beaches were created along the banks of the lake, where all sorts of water sports are practiced.

== Area subdivision ==
According to latest techniques of management of protected areas, this refuge is divided into distinct zones in order to handle them properly.

Areas of special use: areas include reduced in size and which are essential for the administration, office accommodation, restaurant, aviation runway, and so on.

Zone extensive use: areas to which visitors access for education and recreation (and self-guided interpretive trails, paths "cross country", etc.).

Zones intensive: consist of areas with outstanding scenery and that lend themselves to relatively dense recreational activities (camping areas, visitors' centers and scenic lookouts)

Buffer Zones and Recovery: areas that have been severely damaged and it is mostly to areas adjacent to the surrounding populations.

Zone Core: natural areas that have received the minimum of disruption caused by man (with three distinct nuclei and characteristic of the place).

The reserve has a panoramic viewpoint, which can be seen most of the wooded area, as well as the vast body of water formed by the dam. The combined resources of vegetation, topography and water give it a priceless
