= National Parks in the Paraguayan Chaco =

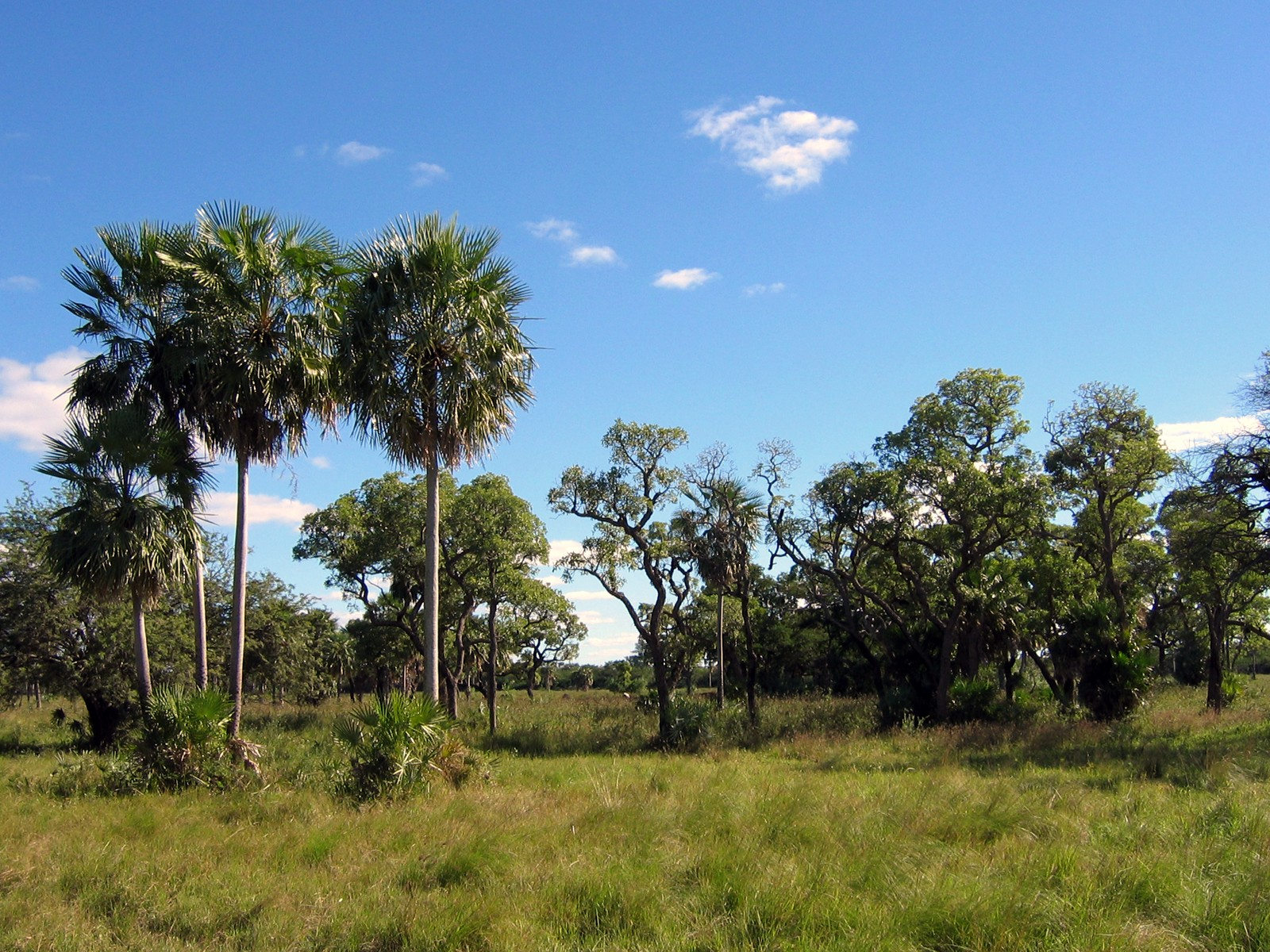
A part of the Paraguayan Chaco

There are a number of national parks and protected areas in the Paraguayan Chaco. The Paraguayan Chaco is the part of the Gran Chaco, South America's second-largest forest, which is within Paraguay, making up 23% of its ~1.000.000 km^{2} land area. It is the largest bioregion in Paraguay, and can be divided into the northwest Dry Chaco, covered by xenomorphic forests adapted to irregular rainfall, and the Humid Chaco, a mosaic of dry forests, palm savannahs, and seasonally flooded wetlands.

Geologically, the Great South American Chaco is a plain and its formation, millions of years ago, is very closely related to the formation of the Andes and the erosive process afterwards. Originally the Chaco was a basin, which within time, was filled with sediments of aerial origin (through wind action) and of pluvial origin (through rivers taking and depositing sediments in the Chaco).

The Paraguayan Chaco is threatened by deforestation, wildfires, and poaching. 50% of the forest covered is projected to be lost as a result of cattle ranching and soy production by 2030, according to the World Land Trust.

== Environmental impacts ==
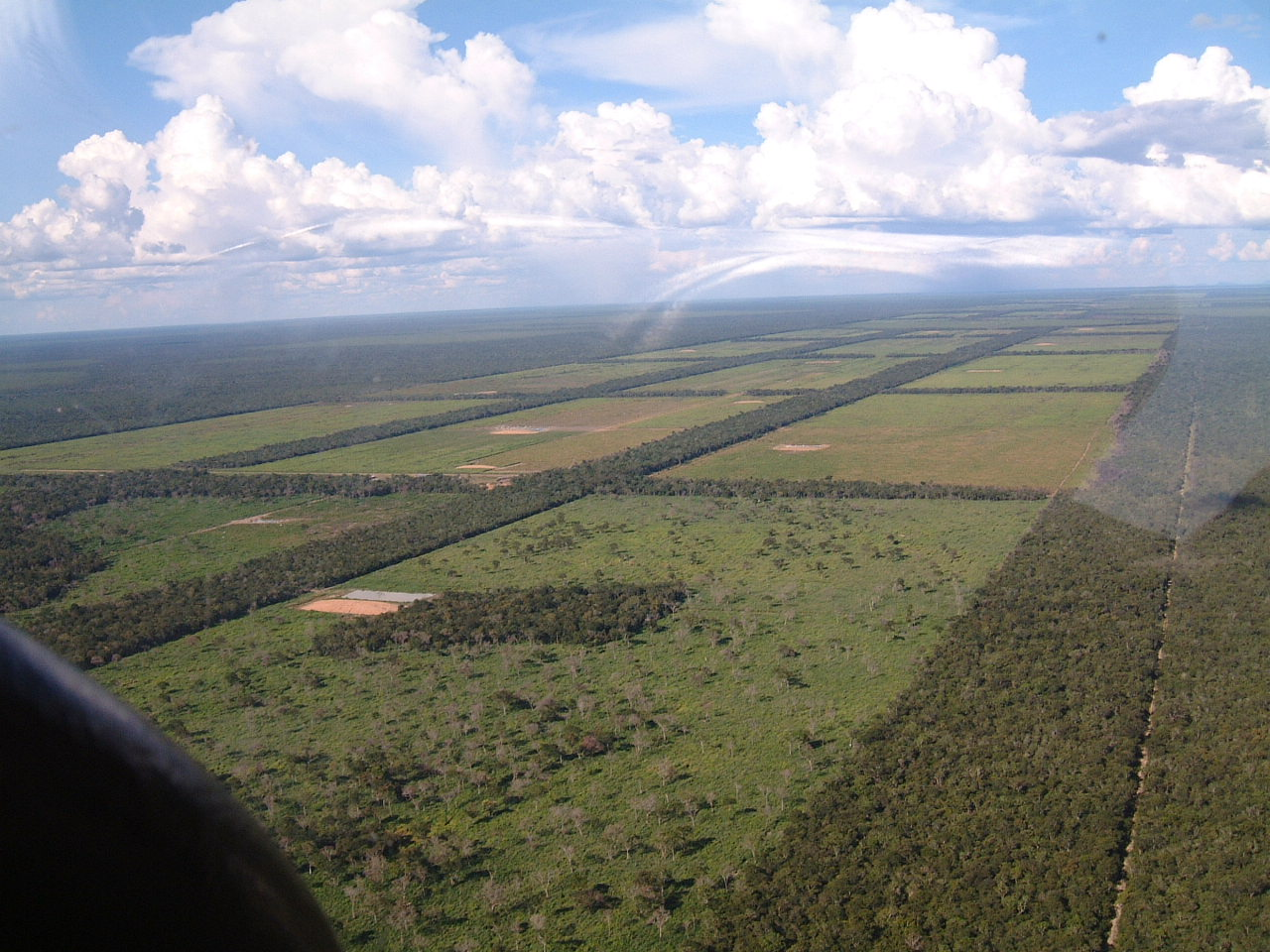
Deforestation in the Paraguayan Chaco

- exploitation of red quebracho trees (Schinopsis balansae and Schinopsis lorentzii) for the tannin industry (19th and 20th centuries)
- Settlement of the Mennonite colonies, from the 1920s, in the Central Chaco
- The Chaco War (Paraguay-Bolivia) (1932–1935)
- Oil prospecting
- Construction and pavement of roads, especially the Carlos Antonio López or Trans-Chaco highway (Route 9), Route 5 between Pozo Colorado and Concepción, and the Bioceanic Corridor.
- Construction of bridges over the Paraguay River: puentes sobre, Puente Remanso (Asunción-Villa Hayes), and the Nanawa bridge (Concepción-Puerto Militar)
- Experimental agro stations

== Protected areas ==
=== Cerro Cabrera – Timané Natural Reservation ===
Created in 1998, today has an area of 125.823 ha. The River Timané is located in the zone and is considered a special river because it does not end up in any water course or lagoon. The Cerro Cabrera is in the border with Bolivia. The vegetation there is mainly a dense savanna and open forests. There are a lot of white quebracho, samuù and palo santo trees. Animals include wild felines, armadillos, giant anteater, and tapir.

=== Chovoreca Natural Monument ===
Choroveca National Monument was created in 1998 with an area of 100.953 ha. Its vegetation is different from the rest of the Chaco and it can be said to be unique in the country. It has a reddish sand soil, which is characteristic of the Oriental Region, and very shallow. Its beauty is unique and difficult to value, for its bushes as well as for the high forest where you can find the endangered trebol (Amburana cearensis). Animals include yurumí u oso hormiguero, el Kaguaré, and other species of felines and armadillos.

=== Defensores del Chaco National Park ===
Defensores del Chaco National Park is the largest protected area in Paraguay. It has an area of 720.000 ha. It was created with the decree number 16.806 on 6 August 1975.

The park covers a vast plain, and the vegetation includes white quebracho, palo santo, samuù, low forests, thorn bushes, and various species of cactus. It is an excellent area for large mammals such as the cats jaguar, puma, tirika (Geoffroy's cat), and jaguarundi, various species of armadillos, Ka'i mirikina (monkey), ka'i pyhare (Azara's night monkey), tagua (Chacoan peccary), and mboreví (South American tapir).

The park includes Cerro León, a unique geological formation in the Chaco. It covers around 40 km of diameter and it is made of a succession of hills.

The way to get there is through a 177 km road from Mcal Estigarribia to Gral P Colman, and from there a road to Lagerenza (north) and to Cerro Leon and Madrejon

=== Médanos del Chaco National Park ===
Médanos del Chaco National Park has an area of 514,233 ha. It was originally included in the Paraguayan Wildlands Project (Global Environment Facility of the UN). Of special interest in this national park are the "médanos" or dunes with their unique vegetation and guanacos. Park rangers have their base of operations in the nearby Teniente Agripino Enciso National Park.

=== Río Negro National Park ===
Created in 1998 with an original area of 30,000 ha, was enlarged in 2004 to 123,789 ha. It protects typical ecosystems of the Pantanal and the Humid Chaco. There are a lot of areas that are regularly flooded and Karanda'y palm trees. It was declared Ramsar Site in 1995 by the Convention on Wetlands of International Importance, because it was considered a habitat of migratory birds as well as other wetland species, both animal and plant. Animals include jaguar, wild parrots, deer from the Pantanal, lobope and yacares. It does not have a plan yet, nor a tourism structure. The way to get there is through the Lagerenza-Bahia Negra road, or through Defensores del Chaco National Park.

=== Teniente Agripino Enciso National Park ===
Teniente Agripino Enciso National Park was created in 1980 with 40.000 ha. Its size and shape is practically rectangular, and it makes it easier to protect from the biological diversity. It has typical landscapes of the Dry Chaco. Due to the lack of water, its vegetation is characterized by dense and almost impenetrable thorn forest. Its typical trees are white quebracho, palo santo, and samu'u. There is a great quantity of wild mammals such as felines (yaguarte and others), the three peccaries (the tagua is the symbol of the area). The park also has trenches and ways from the Chaco War, which can be visited with the park guards who are specially trained to attend tourists.

=== Tinfunqué National Park ===
It was created in 1996 as national park of 280.00ha. Today it is recommended a change of category to reservation of handle resources, because all of its territory is in private hands and the category of national park only can be used in wild areas which are protected and are public. The Tinfunque was declared Site Ramsar and therefore is on the list of the Wet areas of international importance. It occupies a sector which remains flooded in times of high waters of the Pilcomayo River and it has large natural plantation of grass.

There are many shrubs adapted to the floods, and animals such as the ñandy, wild ducks, storks, chaja, aguara guazu, giant anteater, carpincho, and yacares. Its conservation depends only on the wildlife and cattle, and they can be together in the same space. It is very common to see the ñandy and the carpinchos sharing the water with cattle. The way to get there is through the Transchaco road, 180 km, then Pozo Colorado, a detour to the west, to Fortín General Diaz.

== Bibliography ==
- Dirección de Áreas Silvestres Protegidas DAP/SEAM.
- Proyecto Paraguay Silvestre / PAR/98/G33/SEAM.
- Gobernación Departamento Central.
