= Tatí Yupí Refuge =

Tatí Yupí is a biological reserve in the district of Hernandarias, Alto Paraná Department, Paraguay. It is located on the right bank of the Paraná River and covers area of 2,245 hectares (5,550 acres). The reserve is one of 8 sites earmarked as the ecological reserve by the Itaipu, the largest dam in production in the world, located between Paraguay and Brazil.

== Geography and climate ==
It has a relatively uniform topography with small undulations, most stemming from basaltic rocks. It has significant water resources; streams Tati Yupi and Pira Pytâ also in other courses which are small jumps and waterfalls that give rise to scenic beauty. This refuge is bordering the lake, artificially created for the Itaipu power plant in 1982.

Its climate is subtropical, with abundant and well distributed rainfall, which vary from 1,500 to 1,700 mm annually. The average annual temperature is 21 to 22°C. There is a big difference in daytime and nighttime temperature in winter, the relative humidity is 70 to 80% and the prevailing winds are from the northeast and southeast.

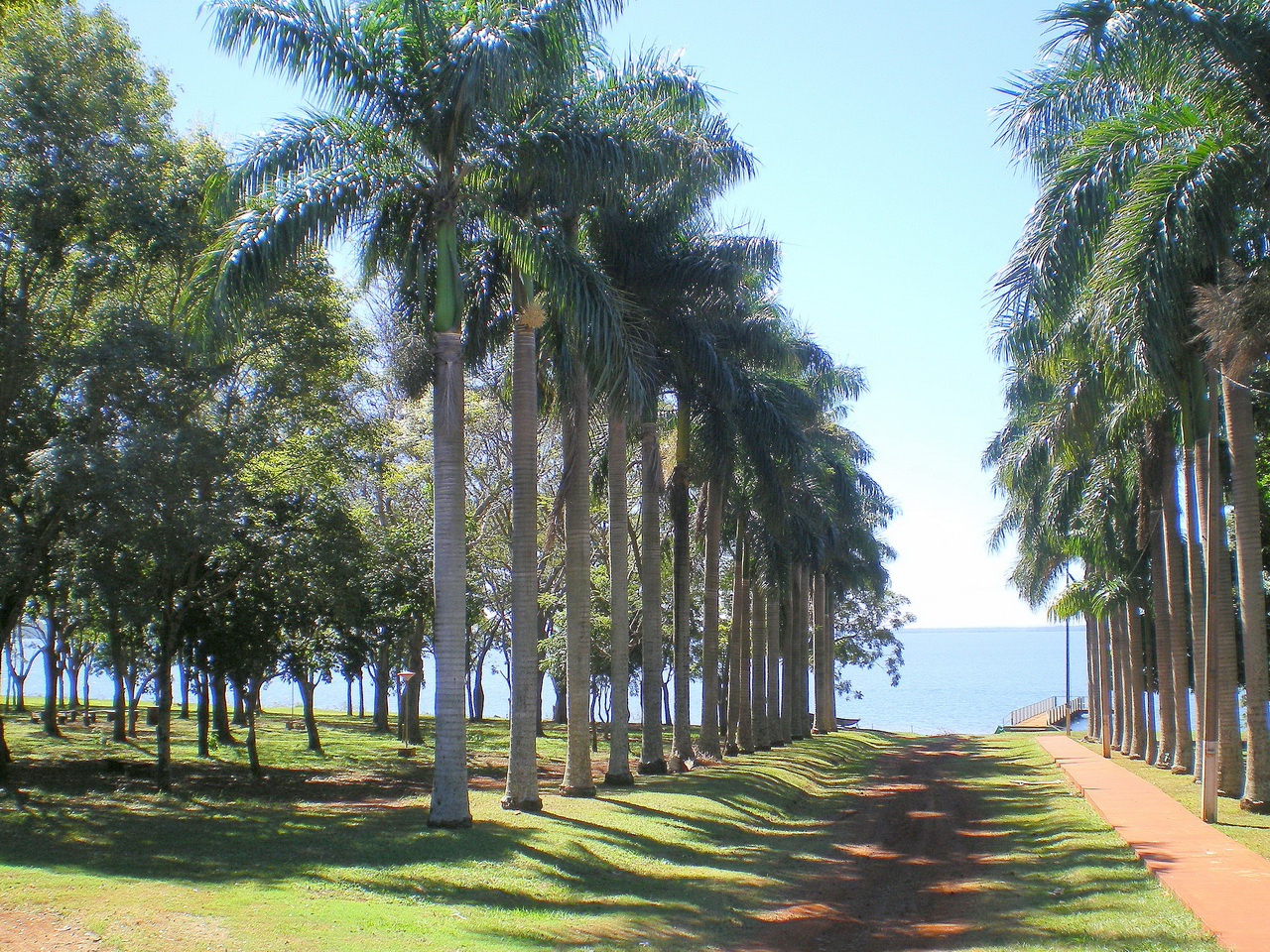
Tati Yupi

== Animals and plants ==
The biological reserve Tati Yupi is composed mainly of high forests, lowland forests, closed yerbal planted pine forests. The upper stratum tree, mostly consists of species exceeding 30 metres (98 ft) in height, such as cedro, lapacho, ybyrá pytá, guatambú. The coppice is generally species of the family of mirtáceas like ñangapiry, yva poroity and guava, kanelon, ka'a vera, ka'a viju. Contin trees and shrubs with average height of 3 to 7 m. The forest is characterized by the high number of species epiphytes and ferns arborescent, palm and a huge variety of bromeliads orchidaceae and piperacillin.

== Tourism ==
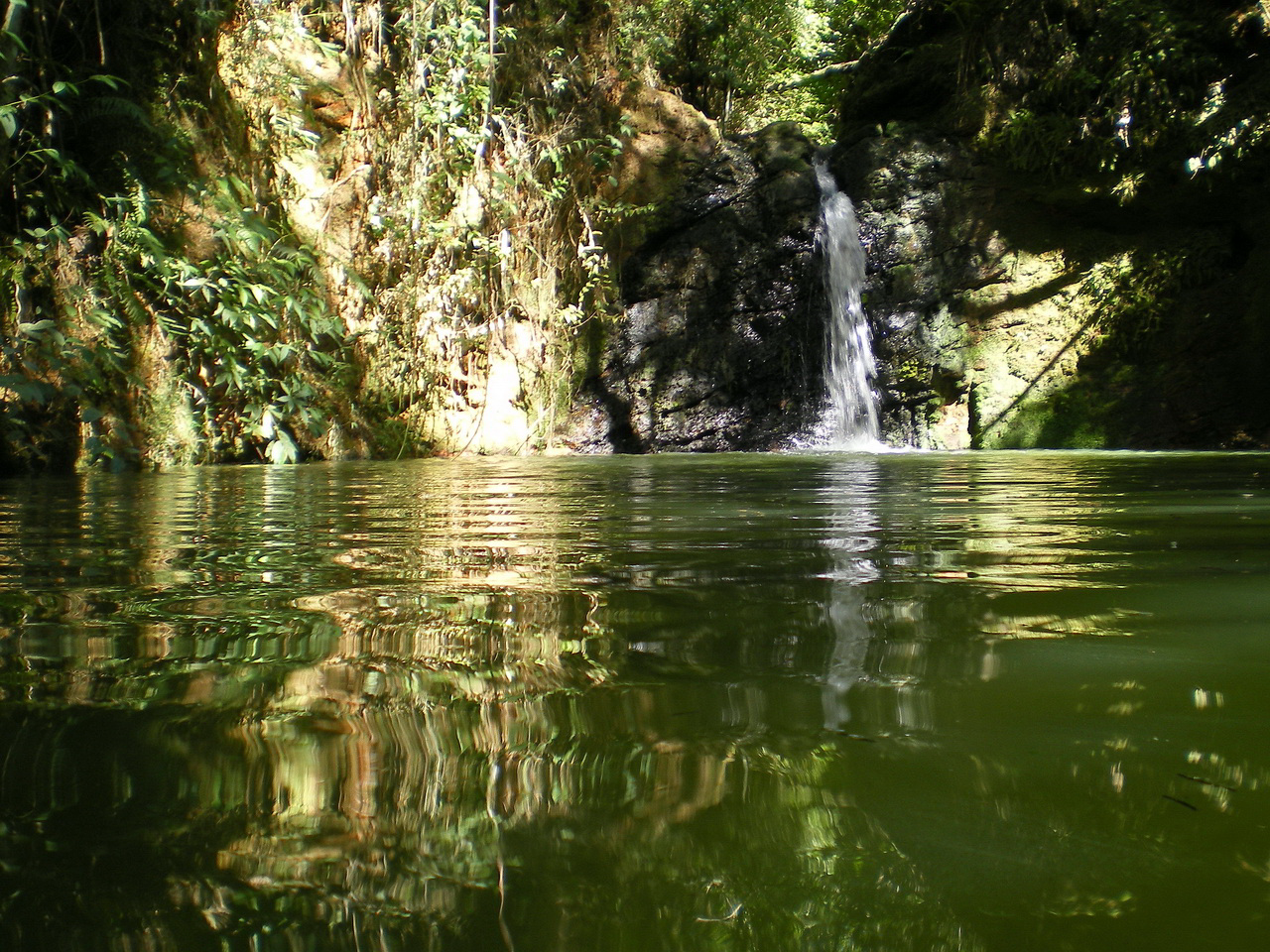
Waterfall

The Tati Yupi biological reserve, as the protected area closest to the conglomerate Hernandarias - Ciudad del Este - City President Franco, is for that reason a very popular place for walking and hiking. In the shelter are carried out educational recreational activities, offering opportunities for environmental education at various levels. Three interpretive trails: Kañimby, Ka'i ladder and allow Palmital knowledge of plants and animals.

Another important activity of importance is the recovery of plant life, which is done through afforestation programs and enrichment of forests. On an ongoing basis, scientific researches will be carried out, particularly relating to indigenous flora and fauna and the interrelationships between all components of biotic and no biotic area. Among the services provided to the public are cited: a guide, talks on environmental education, photographic safari, recreation area with accommodation and amenities for a stay in place, at no cost for visitors.
