= Hernandarias, Paraguay =

Hernandarias Takuru Puku
- District and city
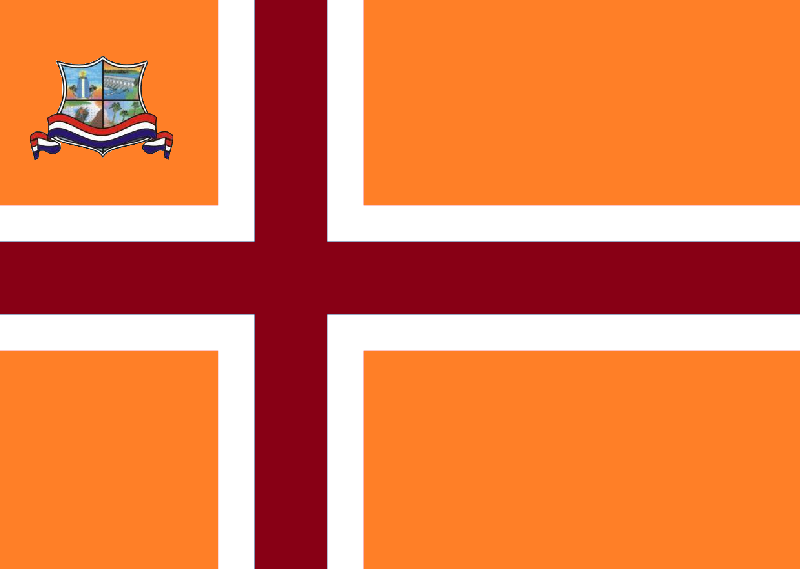
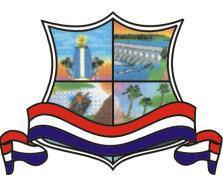
- Flag Seal

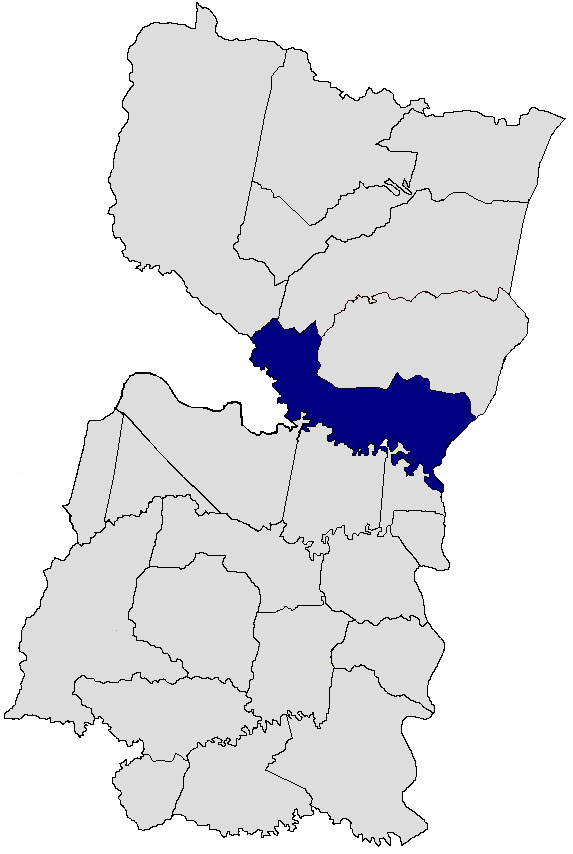
- Hernandarias in the Alto Paraná Department
- Coordinates: 25°22′00″S 54°45′00″W
- Country: Paraguay
- Department: Alto Paraná
- Foundation: 7 July 1896

Government
  - Intendente Municipal: Lic. Rubén Rojas
- Elevation: 243 m (797 ft)

Population (2008)
  - Total: 79,735
- Time zone: -4 Gmt
- Postal code: 7220
- Area code: (595) (631)

Hernandarias (Guarani: Takuru Puku) is a district and city of the Alto Paraná Department, Paraguay. It was named after Hernando Arias de Saavedra, the first South American governor born in the Americas. It is located across the highway from the Itaipu Dam.

Located 349 km from Asunción. It is known as the "Latin American Capital of Electric Power" and is part of the Gran Ciudad del Este.

== Etymology ==
Hernandarias formerly called "Tacurú Pucu" "Long antplace", now bears this name in honor of Hernando Arias de Saavedra, the first native governor of the province Giant Indies during the colonial era.

== Geography ==
The average annual temperature is 21 °C, the highest reaches 38 °C and the minimum 0 °C. The highest annual amount of the country in rainfall occurs in the region of Alto Paraná. In winter are permanent dew and fog.

The town of Hernandarias is surrounded by Acaray and Paraná Rivers.

== Demography ==
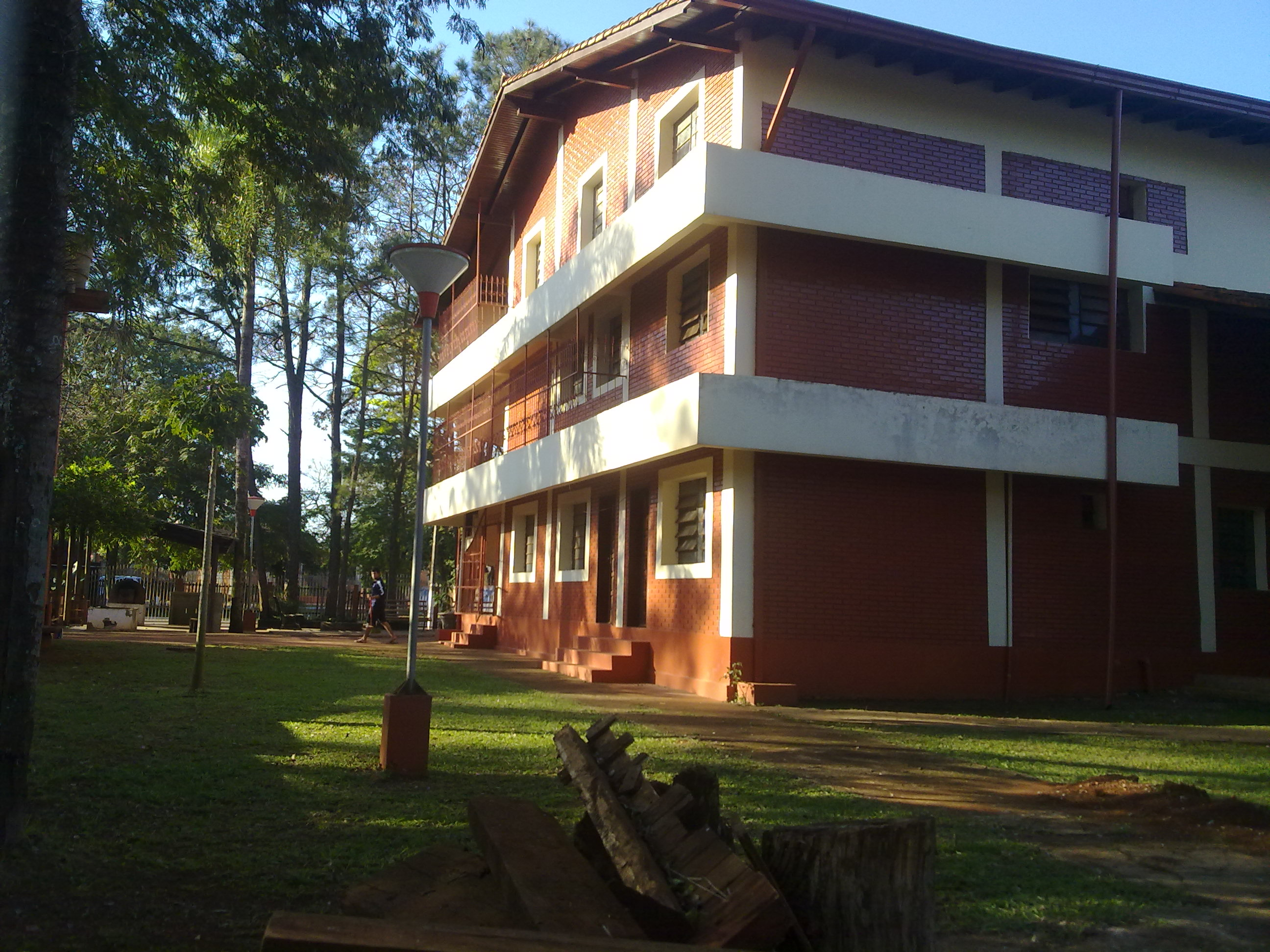
Church of Hernandarias

Of the 79,735 inhabitants, 40,389 were males and 39,346 females, according to estimates by the Directorate General of Statistics, Census and Surveys.

== History ==
The municipality of the third category July 26, 1988 and March 22, 1990, rose as the first class.

Former yerba capital, there was the huge factory yerba "Industrial Paraguaya". With the construction of dams, development and growth of the region can be seen.

It was named after Tacurú Puku by the number of mounds of sand formed by ants scattered across the ground.

== Economy ==
The Capital Latin American electric power has two hydroelectric plants, Acaray which was launched in 1968 and Itaipú, built between 1976 and 1982, is the world's largest dam, considered one of the wonders of the modern world.

It is an agricultural area with palm exploitation, mint, maize, coffee, cotton, rice, beans, wheat and castor, also engaged in animal hunting, forestry and trade.

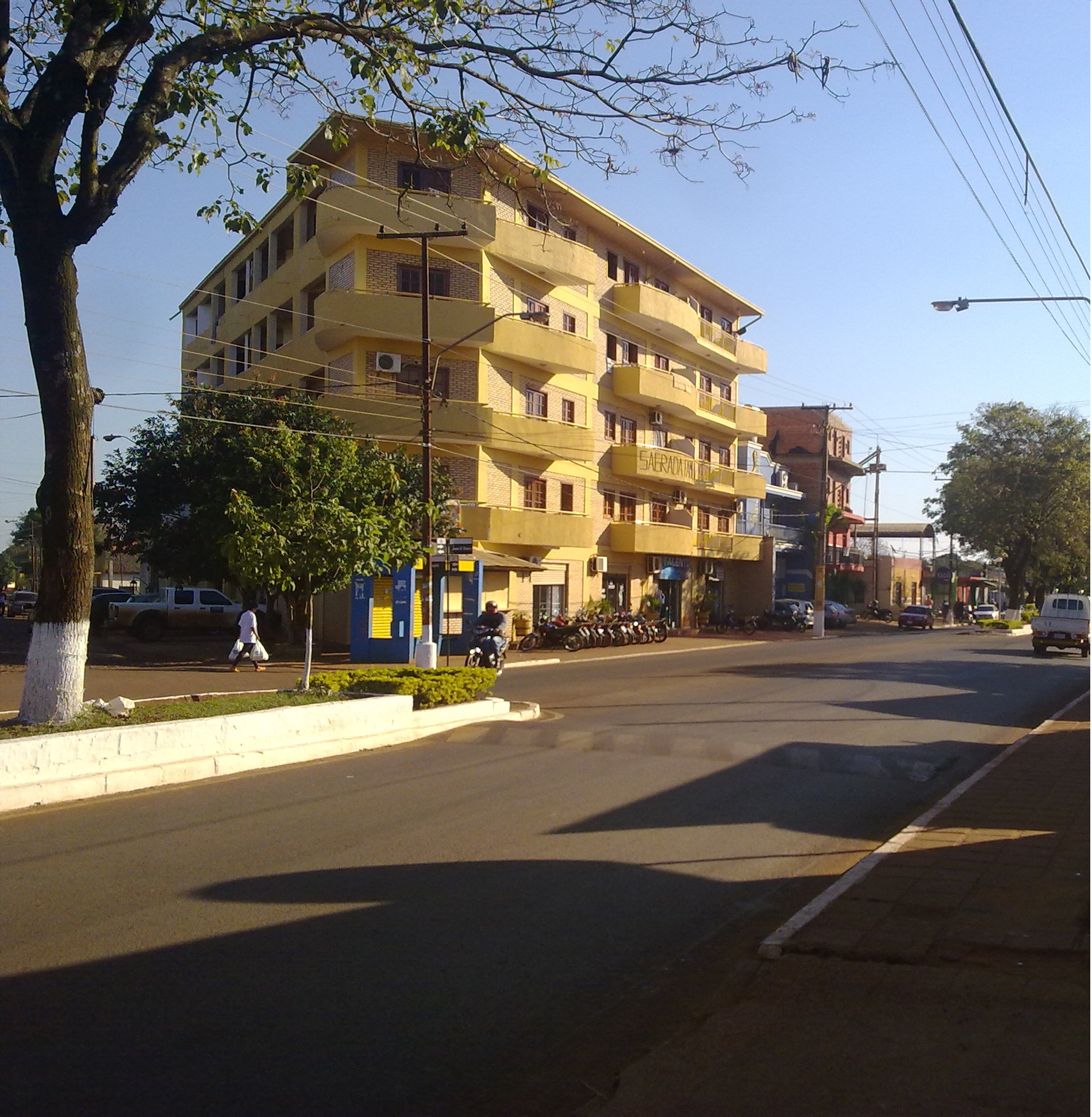
City of Hernandarias

== Tourism ==
They are interesting places for tourists, dams Itaipu and Acaray. Some tourist sites in Hernandarias created from the construction of the Itaipu are:

- 'Biological Reserve Itabo': ecoregion located in the Alto Paraná, 80 km from the town of Hernandarias, has an area of 13,807 has of undulating topography. The river of the same name, Itabo, crosses the reservation from west to east with their two arms, North Itabo and Itabo South and some of its tributaries. The climate is subtropical in the region, with light rainfall, ranging from 1,500 to 1,700 mm. The plants of the reservation that predominates:Tabebuiasp., Peltophorum dubium, Cedrela fissilisamong others.
- 'Museum of the Earth Guarani' is the first multimedia interactive museum of Paraguay, is organized into two pavilions. The World Guarani where the culture and lifestyle of the ancient inhabitants of this region Guarani, its economy and history, as well as people of 10,000 years ago. In the World of Science are animals living in the area. The museum is 7 km from Ciudad del Este, the Environmental Center of the Itaipu dam.
- 'Museum of Natural History' which takes samples from animals and plants in the area.
- 'Zoo Itaipu' which houses animal species in an area of 12 hectares.
- 'Forest Nursery' with samples of plants in the region, which are conducted annually nearly 200,000 pairs of more than 500 species of ornamental plants, fruit and forestry. Plants from the nursery are used for reforestation of degraded areas, landscaping throughout the entity or entities that request.
- Aquaculture station where he reared fish species, will have laboratories, ponds, hatcheries and skilled human resources for the generation and transfer of technology. The main species that breed in the season are: pacú, karimbatá, gold, surubí, etc.
- 'Refuge Tatar yupi' with recreational areas on the shores of Lake River and Tatar Yup, where tourists can do photographic safari, guided tours and boat rides.

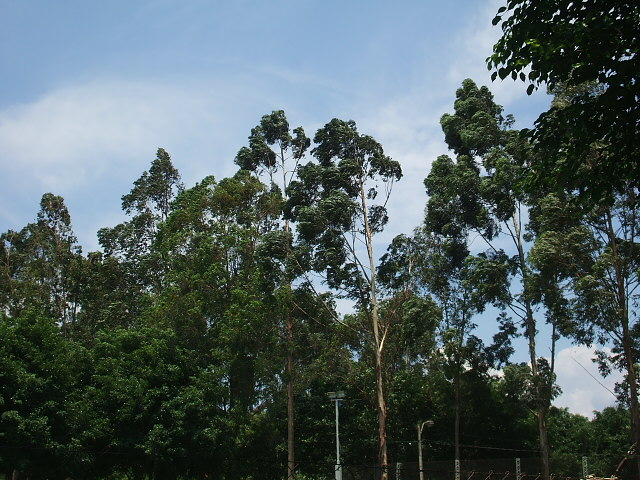
Vegetation in the area of Hernandarias

- 'Municipal Theatre' Hernandarias recently remodeled has the capacity to house nearly a thousand people, are made artistic performances, dance, theatre, choirs, etc.
- 'Walk Spain' is an architectural complex within which are the Departments of Culture, Tourism and education of the Municipality of Hernandarias, are also the Library and Technology Park.
- Parana Country Club is an exclusive residential neighborhood, which has a number of aspects that make it one of the best places to live.

== How to get there ==
This city is located 15 km from Ciudad del Este, on Route II "Mcal. Estigarribia" until the viaduct in the 4 km; take the highway that leads to Saltos del Guairá.

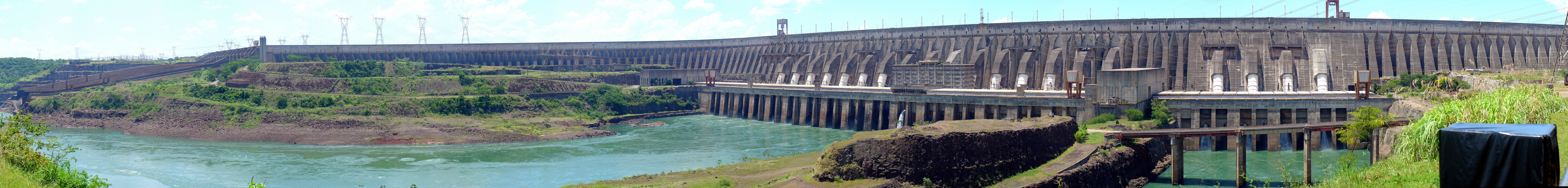
Panoramic view of the Itaipu Dam, located in this district.
