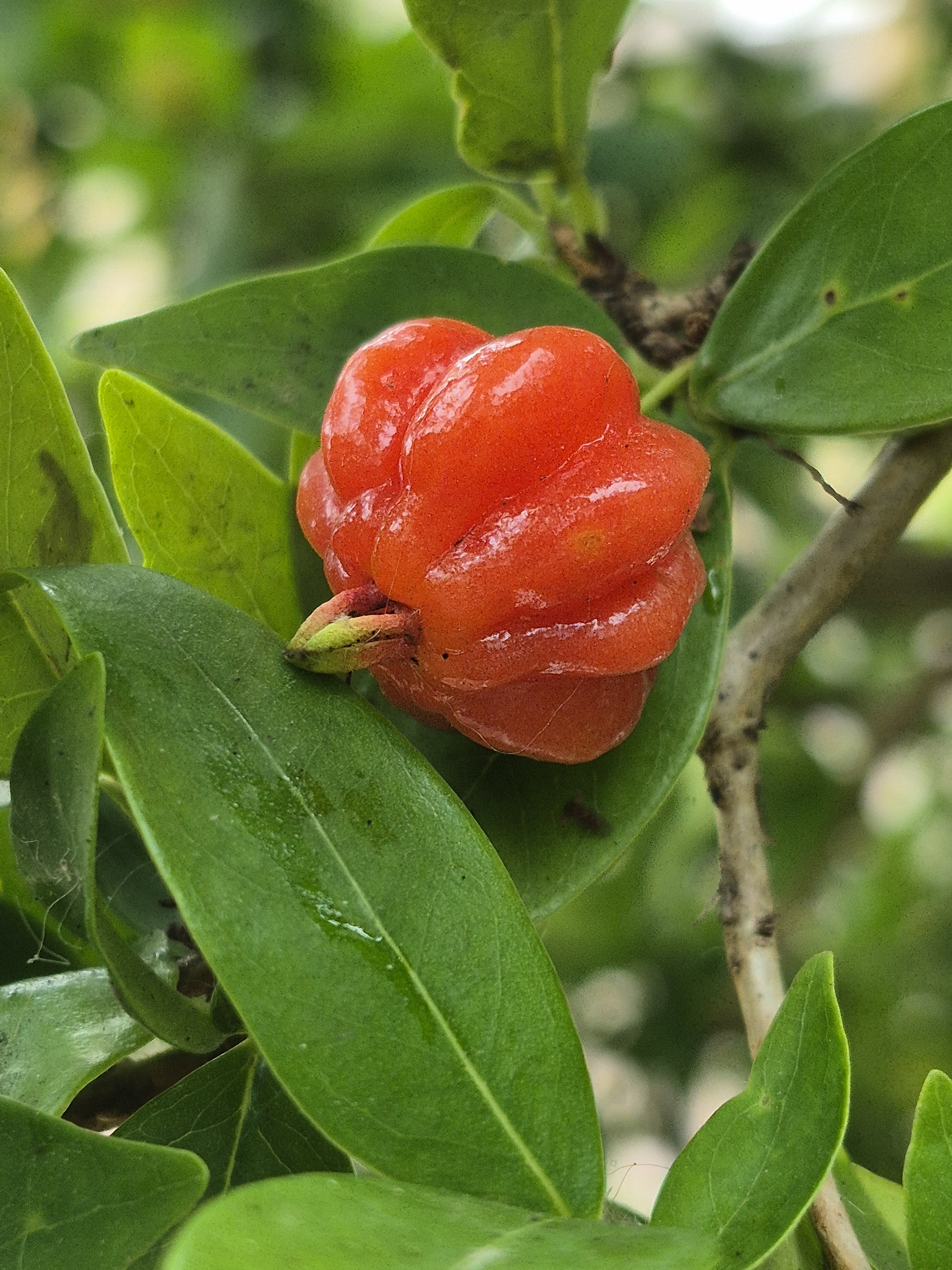
- Fruit

Conservation status
- Least Concern (IUCN 3.1)

Scientific classification
- Kingdom: Plantae
- Clade: Tracheophytes
- Clade: Angiosperms
- Clade: Eudicots
- Clade: Rosids
- Order: Myrtales
- Family: Myrtaceae
- Genus: Eugenia
- Species: E. uniflora

Binomial name
- Eugenia uniflora L.

Synonyms
- List: Eugenia arechavaletae Herter; Eugenia costata Cambess.; Eugenia dasyblasta (O.Berg) Nied.; Eugenia decidua Merr.; Eugenia indica Nicheli; Eugenia lacustris Barb. Rodr.; Eugenia michelii Lam.; Eugenia microphylla Barb. Rodr.; Eugenia myrtifolia Salisb.; Eugenia oblongifolia (O.Berg) Arechav.; Eugenia oblongifolia (O.Berg) Nied. nom. illeg.; Eugenia strigosa (O.Berg) Arechav.; Eugenia willdenowii (Spreng.) DC. nom. illeg.; Eugenia zeylanica Willd.; Luma arechavaletae (Herter) Herter; Luma costata (Cambess.) Herter; Luma dasyblasta (O.Berg) Herter; Luma strigosa (O.Berg) Herter; Myrtus brasiliana L.; Myrtus willdenowii Spreng.; Plinia pedunculata L.f.; Plinia petiolata L. nom. illeg.; Plinia rubra L.; Plinia tetrapetala L.; Stenocalyx affinis O.Berg; Stenocalyx brunneus O.Berg; Stenocalyx costatus (Cambess.) O.Berg; Stenocalyx dasyblastus O.Berg; Stenocalyx glaber O.Berg; Stenocalyx impunctatus O.Berg; Stenocalyx lucidus O.Berg; Stenocalyx michelii (Lam.) O.Berg; Stenocalyx nhampiri Barb. Rodr.; Stenocalyx oblongifolius O.Berg; Stenocalyx rhampiri Barb.Rodr.; Stenocalyx ruber (L.) Kausel; Stenocalyx strigosus O.Berg; Stenocalyx uniflorus (L.) Kausel; Syzygium michelii (Lam.) Duthie

= Eugenia uniflora =

Species of flowering plant in the myrtle family

Pitanga, (surinam-cherry), raw
Nutritional value per 100 g (3.5 oz)
- Energy: 138 kJ (33 kcal)
- Carbohydrates: 7.49 g
- Fat: 0.4 g
- Protein: 0.8 g
Vitamins and minerals
Vitamins	Quantity %DV^{†}
Vitamin A equiv.	8% 75 μg
Thiamine (B1)	3% 0.03 mg
Riboflavin (B2)	3% 0.04 mg
Niacin (B3)	2% 0.3 mg
Vitamin C	29% 26.3 mg
Minerals	Quantity %DV^{†}
Calcium	1% 9 mg
Iron	1% 0.2 mg
Magnesium	3% 12 mg
Phosphorus	1% 11 mg
Potassium	3% 103 mg
Sodium	0% 3 mg
- Link to USDA Database entry
- ^{†}Percentages estimated using US recommendations for adults, except for potassium, which is estimated based on expert recommendation from the National Academies.

Eugenia uniflora is a flowering plant in the family Myrtaceae, native to tropical and subtropical South America's east coast, ranging from Suriname, French Guiana to southern Brazil, as well as Uruguay and parts of Paraguay and Argentina.

It is also known as Brazilian cherry, Cayenne cherry, cerisier carré, monkimonki kersie, ñangapirí, pitanga, shimarucu, and Suriname cherry.

It is often used in gardens as a hedge or screen.

It produces small, ribbed fruits (2 to 4 centimetres or 3/4 to 1-1/2 in), starting as green, then ranging through orange, scarlet, and maroon as they ripen.

The tree was introduced to Bermuda for ornamental purposes, but is now out of control and listed as an invasive species.

The tree has also been introduced to Florida.

== Description ==
Eugenia uniflora is a large shrub or small tree with a conical form, growing slowly to 8 metres (26 ft) high. When bruised, crushed, or cut, the leaves and branches have a spicy resinous fragrance, which can cause respiratory discomfort in susceptible individuals. The leaves are without stipules, ovate, glossy, and held in opposite pairs. New leaves are bronze, copper, or coppery-pinkish in color, maturing to deep glossy green, up to 4 centimetres (1 1/2 in) long. During winter, the leaves turn red.

Flowers have four white petals and are borne on long, slender stalks, with a conspicuous central cluster of white stamens ending in yellow anthers. Flowers develop into ribbed fruits 2 to 4 centimetres (3/4 to 1 1/2 in) long, starting as green, then ranging through orange, scarlet, and maroon as they ripen. Because fruit-eating birds distribute the seeds, they can become a weed in suitable tropical and subtropical habitats, displacing native flora.

== Uses ==
=== Culinary uses ===
The edible fruit is a botanical berry. The taste ranges from sweet to sour, depending on the cultivar and level of ripeness (the darker red to black range is quite sweet, while the green to orange range is strikingly tart). Its predominant food use is as a flavoring and base for jams and jellies. The fruit is high in vitamin C and a source of provitamin A.

The leaves are also used for tea in certain parts of Uruguay.

=== Use as an insect repellent ===
The leaves are spread on some house floors in Brazil so that they exude a smell that repels flies when crushed underfoot.

=== Medical uses ===
Eugenia uniflora has several significant pharmacological properties. Its essential oil is antihypertensive, antidiabetic, antitumor and analgesic, and it has shown antiviral and antifungal activity. It has performed against microorganisms such as Trichomonas gallinae (in vitro), Trypanosoma cruzi and Leishmania amazonensis.

== Gallery ==
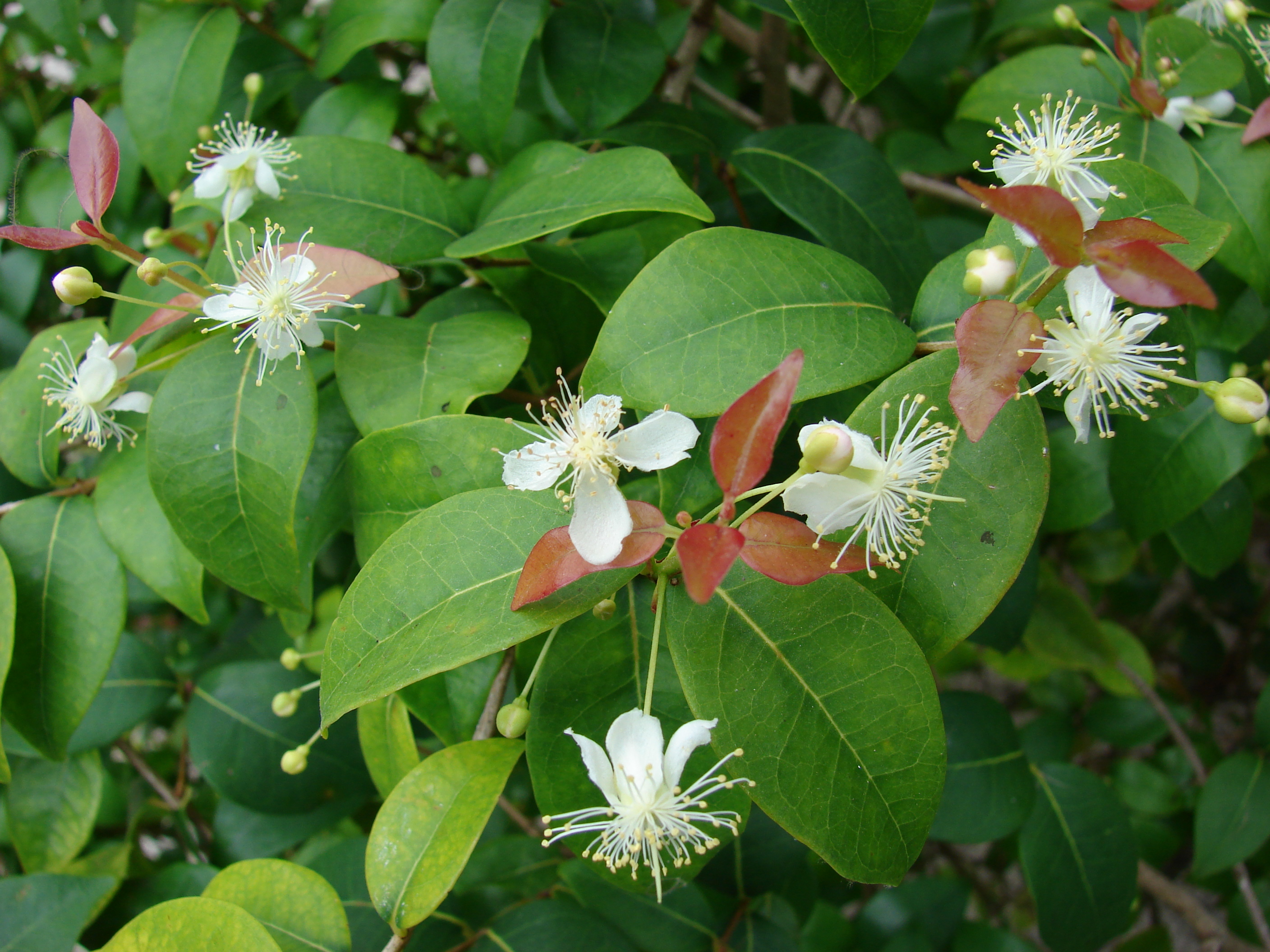
Flowers

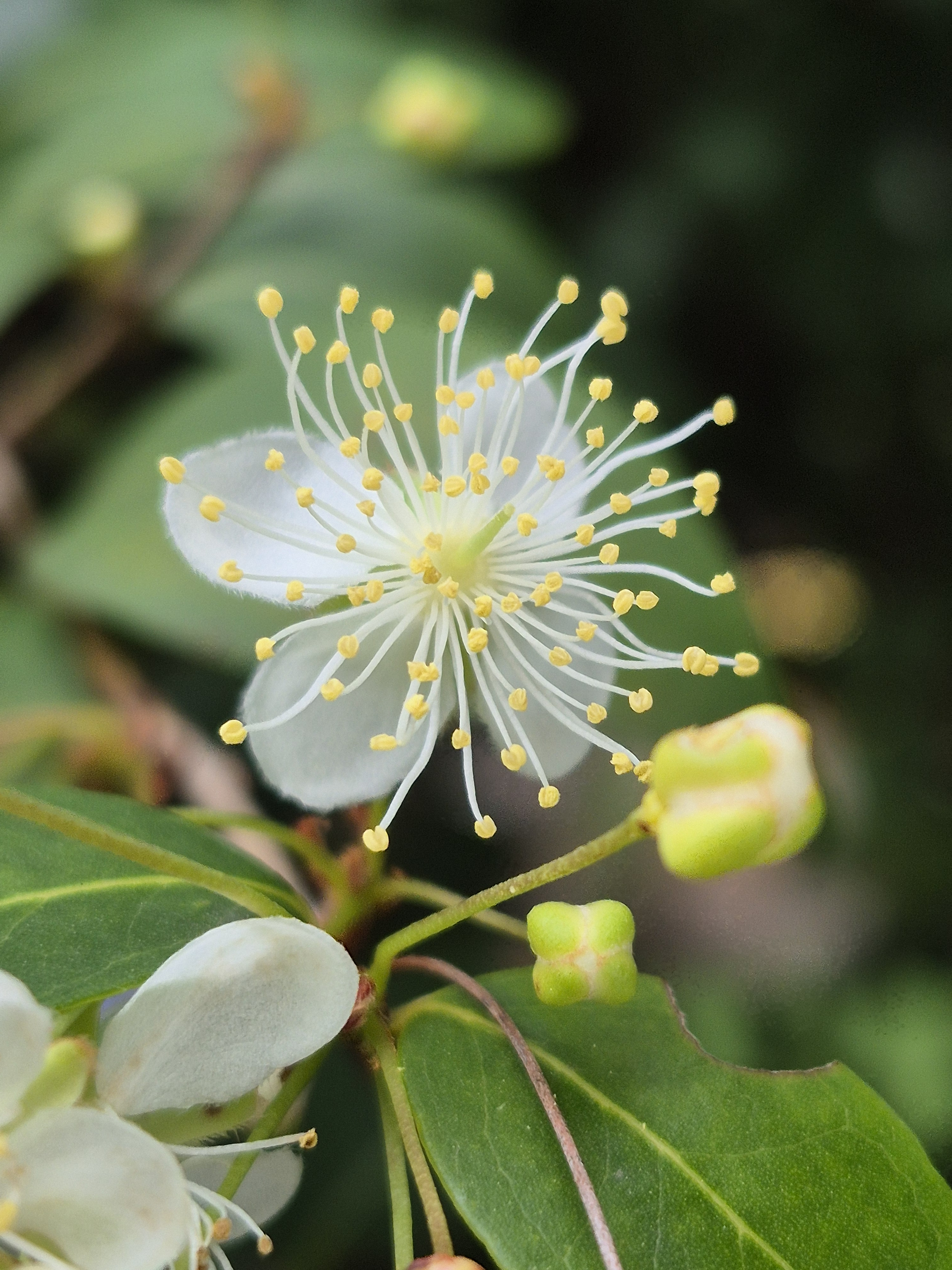
Flower

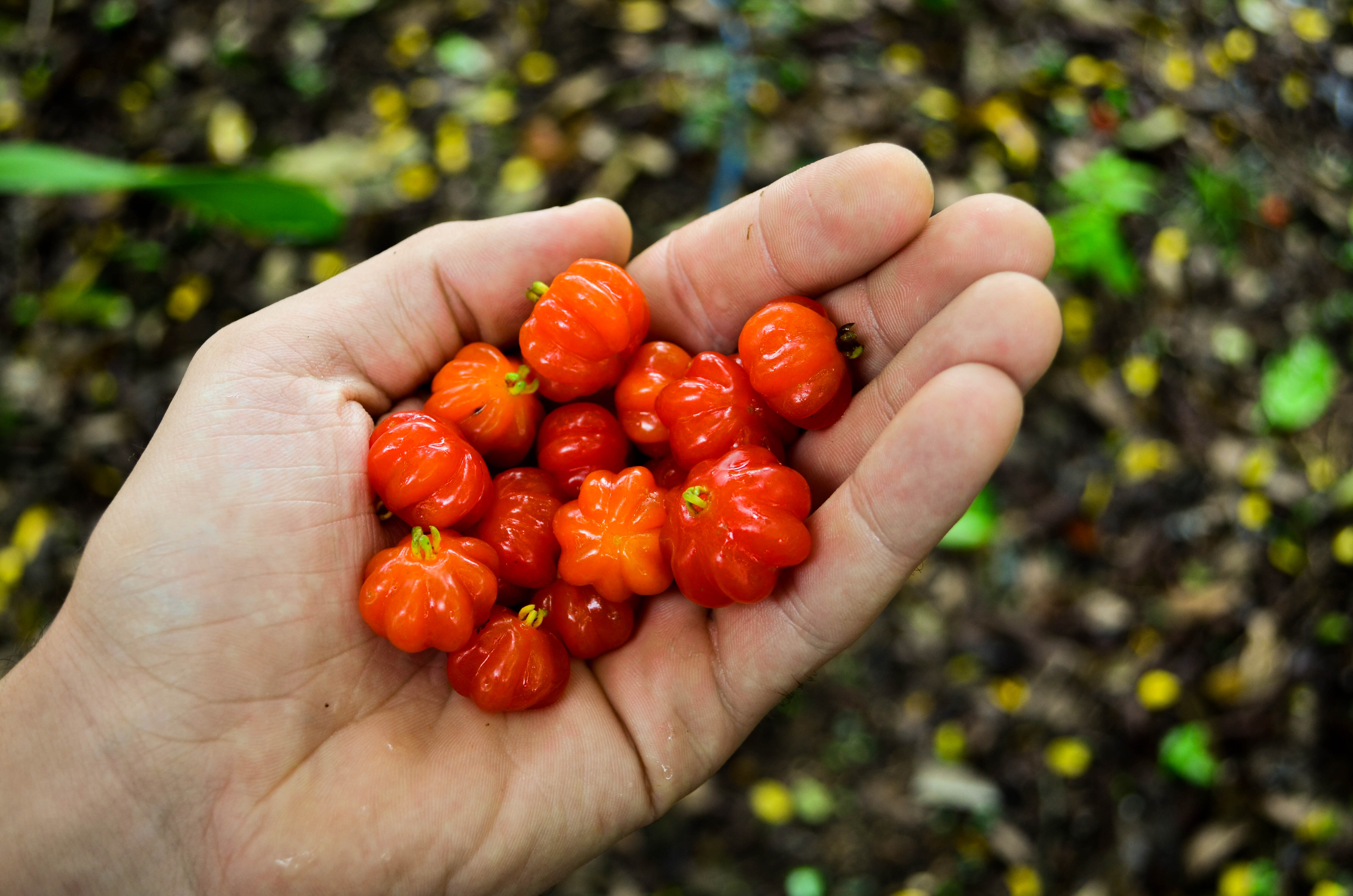
Fruits

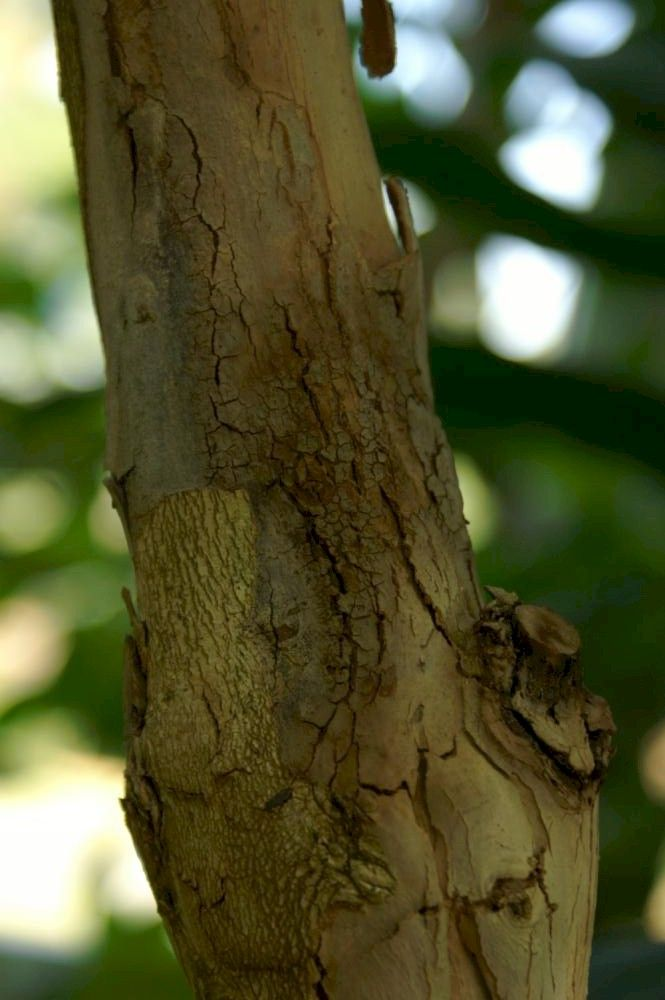
Trunk

Flower

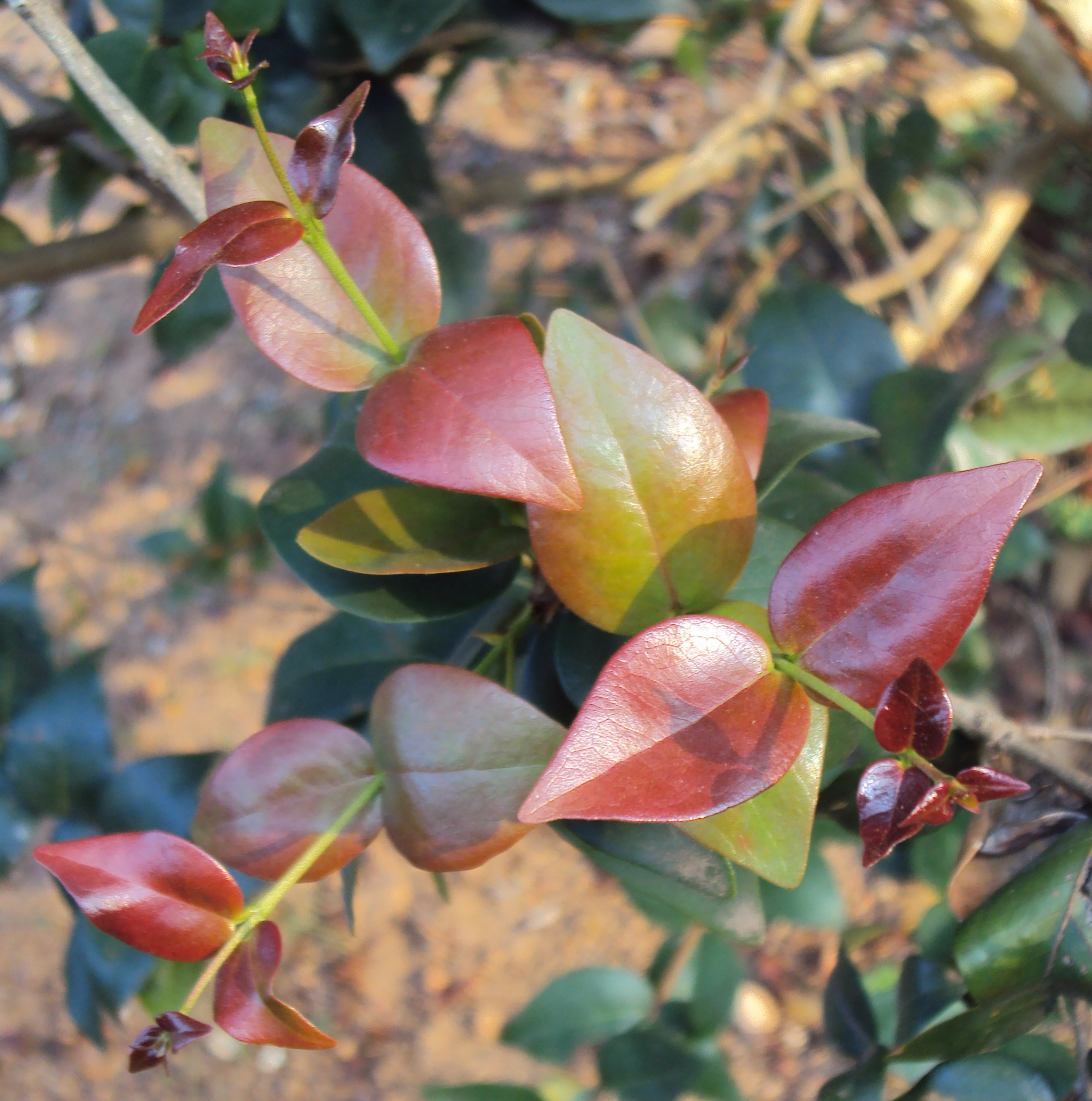
Young leaves

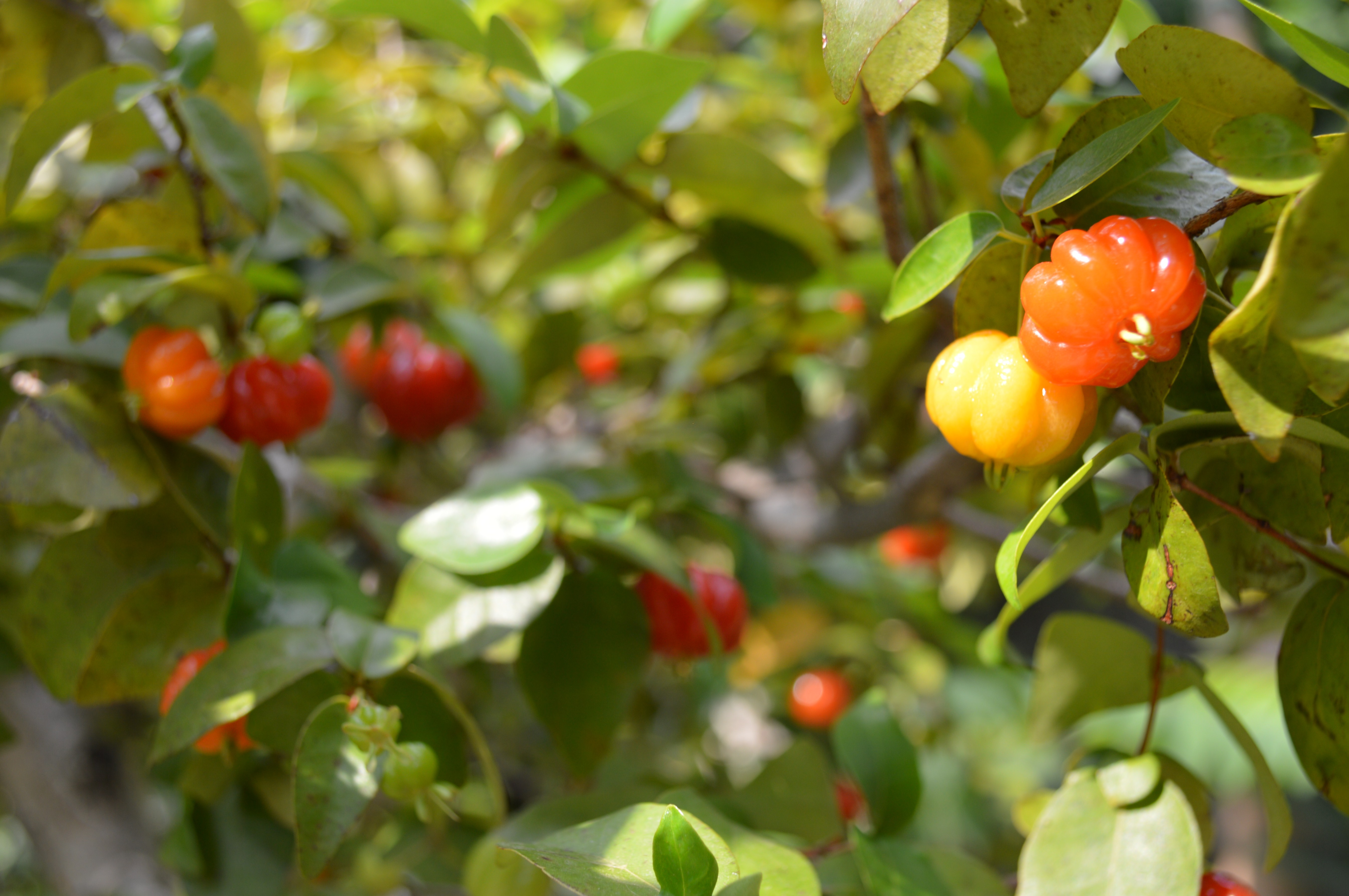
Fruits on tree

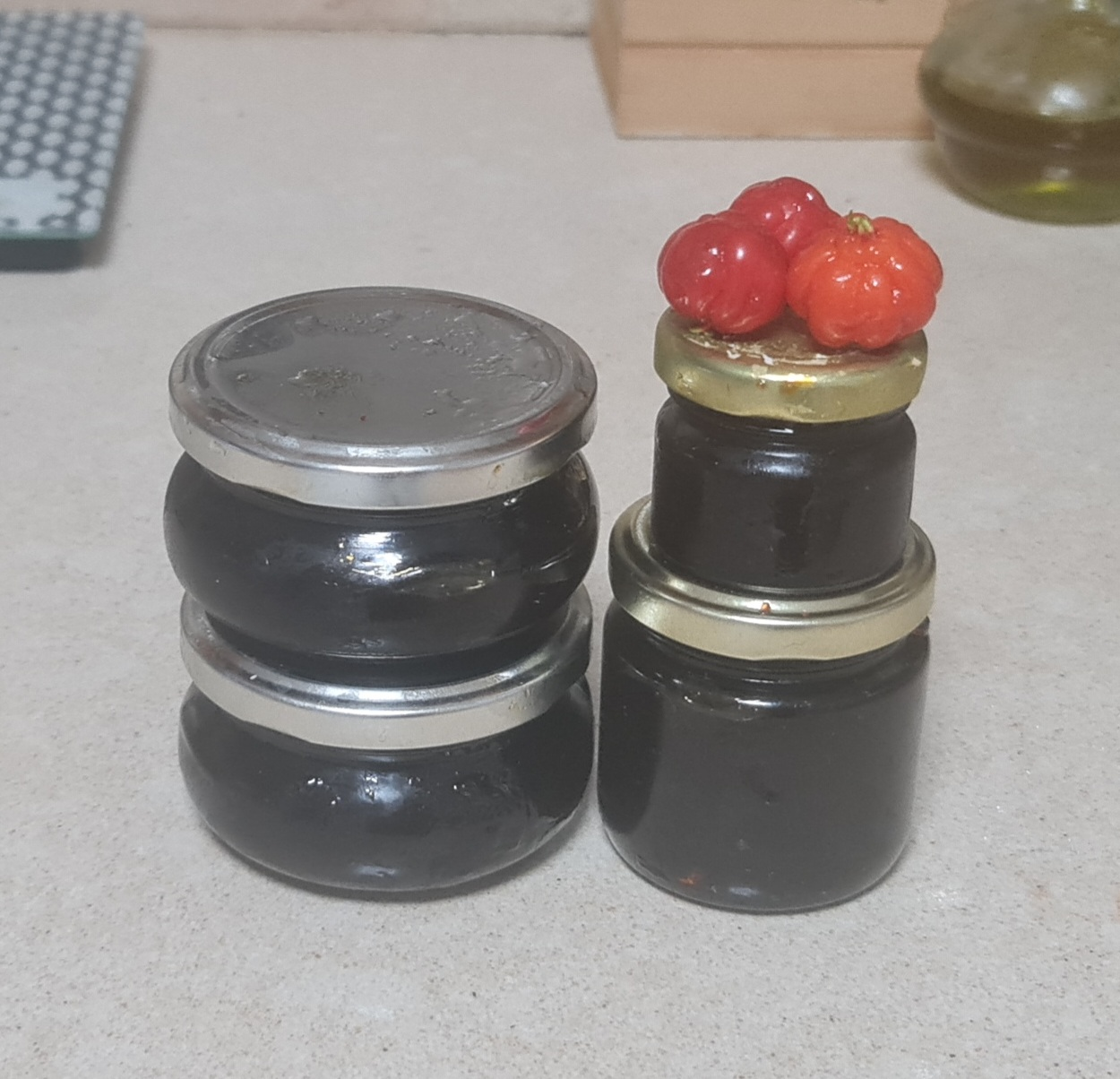
Pitanga jam
