= Puerto Iguazú =

- City
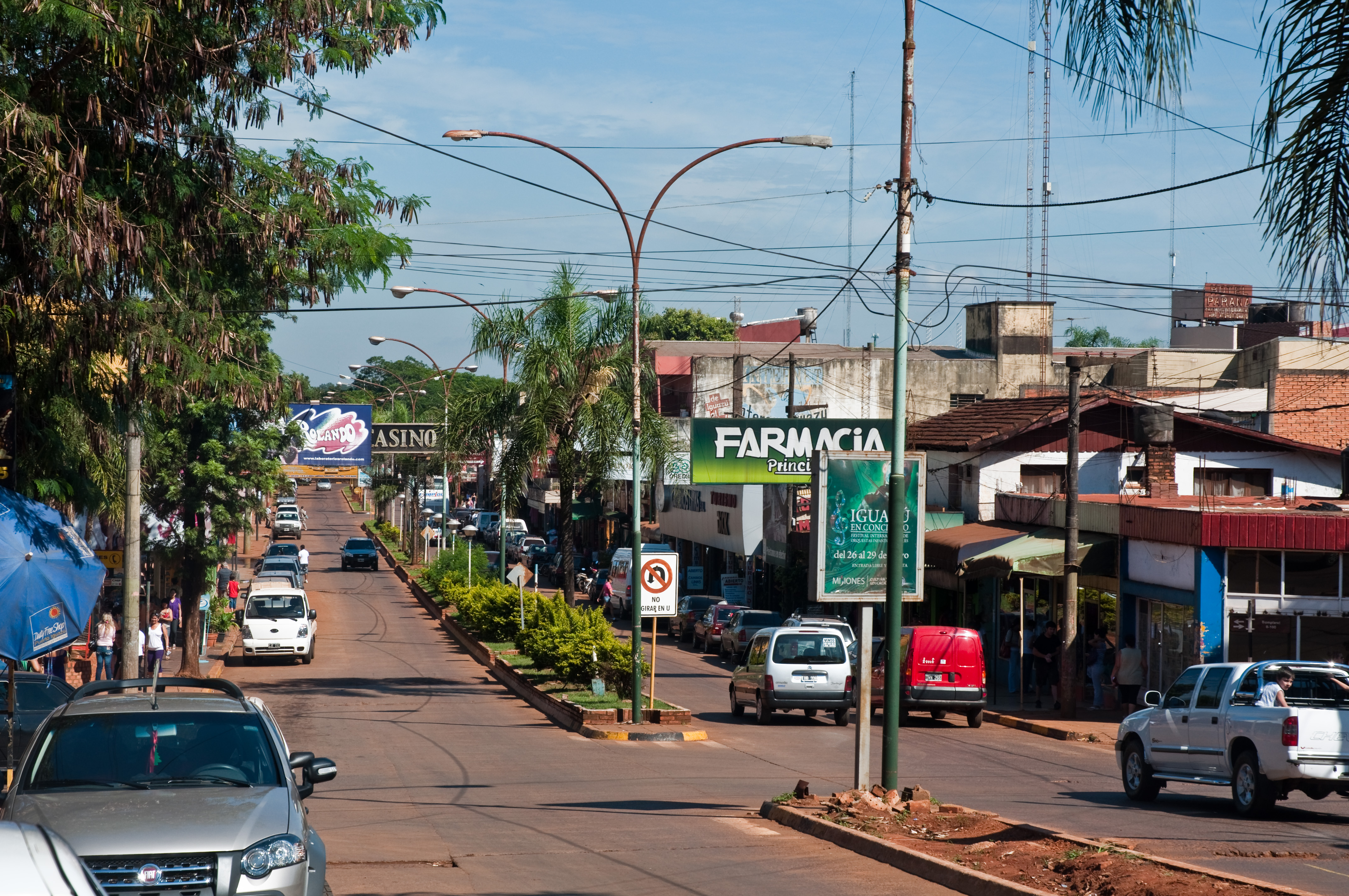
- Avenida Aguirre, one of the main avenues in Puerto Iguazú

- Location in Argentina Puerto Iguazú (Argentina)
- Coordinates: 25°36′S 54°34′W
- Country: Argentina
- Province: Misiones
- Department: Iguazú
- Elevation: 162 m (531 ft)

Population (2010 census [INDEC])
  - Total: 82,227
- Time zone: UTC−3 (ART)
- Website: http://www.iguazu.gob.ar/ (in Spanish)

Puerto Iguazú is a border city in the province of Misiones, Argentina. With a population of 82,227 (2010 census [INDEC]), it is the fourth largest city in the Province, after Posadas, Oberá, and Eldorado. The Iguazú Falls are 18 kilometres (11 mi) away from the city, and as a result the city has developed much of its infrastructure around tourism.

== History ==
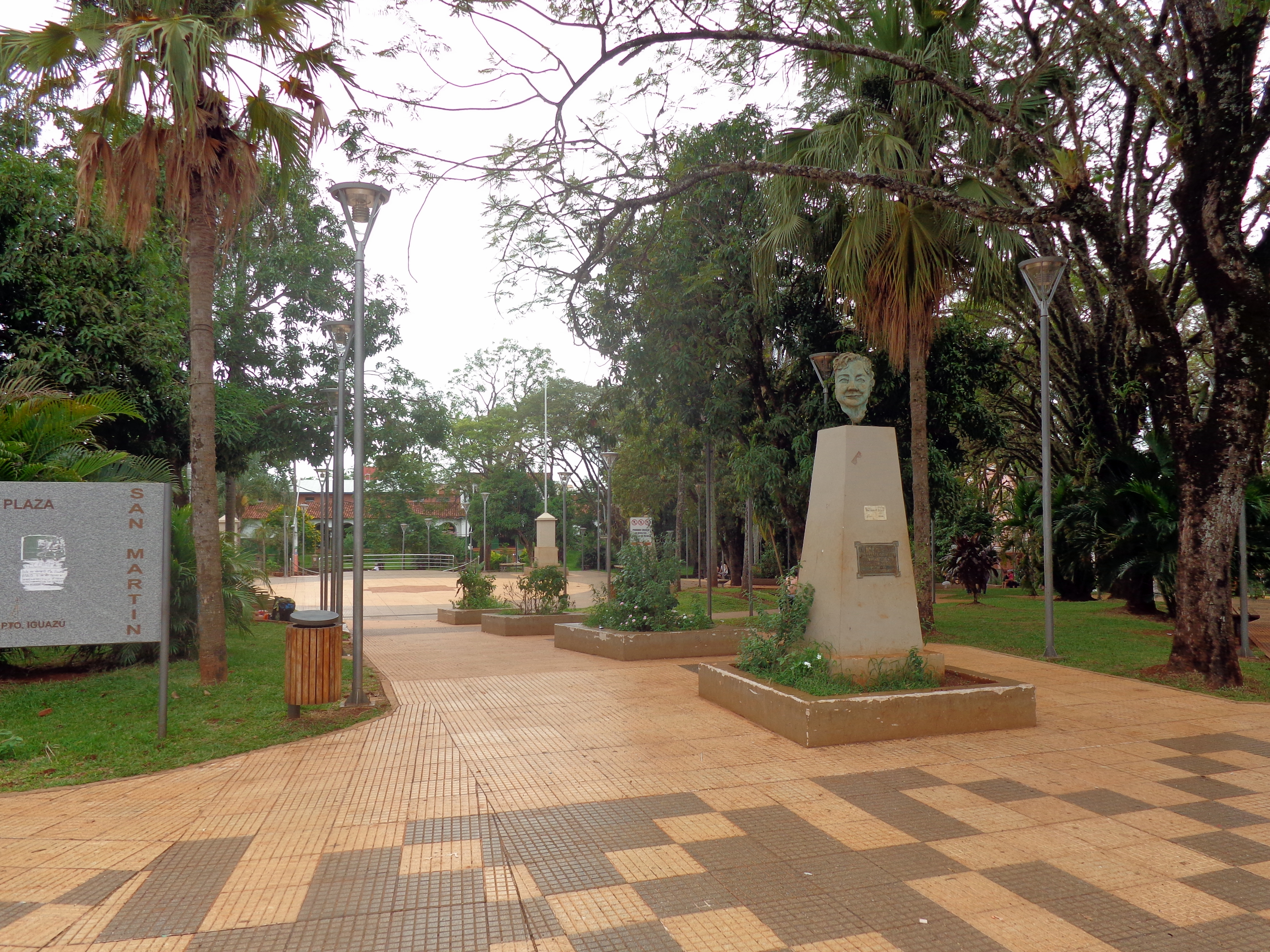
San Martín Square

Spanish explorer Álvar Núñez Cabeza de Vaca became, in 1542, the first European to discover what are now called Iguazú Falls. He was drawn by the noise of the water, which can be heard at a distance of several kilometers. When the Spanish arrived in the 16th century, the Guaraní people were the principal inhabitants of the area.

Despite its early exploration, the area remained occupied only by the Guaraní Indians until 1880. Corrientes Province, which at that time included what is now Misiones, sold 50 square leagues (13,000 square kilometres (5,000 sq mi)) at the current site of Puerto Iguazú near the falls in 1881. The land changed hands three times in the course of just two years, and ended up as the property of Gregorio Lezama. At that time Misiones separated from Corrientes. Lezama funded a scientific expedition to explore the territory, enlisting Carlos Bosetti and Jordan Hummel for that purpose. Those two explorers later organized the first tourist trip to the falls; Lezama sold the land in 1888 to Martín Errecaborde and Company.

Territorial Governor Rudecindo Roca established Iguazú Department, one of 5 initial subdivisions in Misiones, in 1882. A Justice of the Peace, Alberto Mujica, was assigned to the area in 1897. The firm of Gibaja y Núñez opened the town's first hotel at this time to serve the growing numbers of tourists visiting Iguazú Falls. One of these, Victoria Aguirre, funded the first road into the town in 1901 as well as other civic improvements, and it was in her honor that on September 10, 1902, the settlement was formally established as Puerto Aguirre. A police department (1913), a civil registrar (1916), and a post office (1928) followed.

The Iguazú National Park was established as such by the national government in 1934, and in 1943 the town was renamed Puerto Iguazú. The Tancredo Neves Bridge, connecting the city with neighboring Foz do Iguaçu (Brazil), was opened in 1985.

== Climate ==
Puerto Iguazú has a Humid Subtropical climate (Cfa according to Köppen climate classification). Temperatures are warm in winter and hot in summer. There is no dry season and rainfall is abundant with every month receiving over 100 mm (3.9 in) of rain and the wettest month, November, receiving over 200 mm (7.9 in) of rain on average. Precipitation falls mostly during convective storms. Due to abundant rainfall, rainforests surrounds Puerto Iguazú.

The hot season lasts for up to 6 months or more, with temperatures reaching between 30 and 35 °C (86 and 95 °F) on most days, and dropping to 18 to 24 °C (64 to 75 °F) at night. Thunderstorms with heavy rains bring relief when the heat becomes too intense. The cool season runs from late April to mid September, with daily highs reaching an average of 21 °C (70 °F) and a low of 11 °C (52 °F) in June. These averages are reached through an alternating weather pattern, with several days with northerly winds and temperatures of around 28 °C (82 °F) or higher and warm nights over 15 °C (59 °F) giving way, in a very sudden manner, to cool, rainy weather and temperatures between 10 and 15 °C (50 and 59 °F) for a few days, then to dry, sunny weather and colder nights (around 5 °C, or 41F, and sometimes much lower) and pleasant days in the 15 to 20 °C (59 to 68 °F) range, and a gradual increase in temperatures as winds rotate to the north again. Frost is rare but does occur on some winters, and temperatures within a few degrees of freezing occur every winter. The record low is −4.9 °C (23.2 °F), a surprisingly low value given the latitude, the vegetation and the low elevation of the area.

Temperatures above 40 °C (104 °F) have been recorded in the spring and summer.

Climate data for Puerto Iguazú (International Airport), Argentina 1991–2020, extremes 1961–present
Month	Jan	Feb	Mar	Apr	May	Jun	Jul	Aug	Sep	Oct	Nov	Dec	Year
Record high °C (°F)	40.6 (105.1)	39.0 (102.2)	38.5 (101.3)	35.2 (95.4)	32.5 (90.5)	32.0 (89.6)	31.9 (89.4)	35.6 (96.1)	40.0 (104.0)	40.1 (104.2)	39.9 (103.8)	40.0 (104.0)	40.6 (105.1)
Mean daily maximum °C (°F)	32.0 (89.6)	31.5 (88.7)	30.6 (87.1)	27.8 (82.0)	23.5 (74.3)	22.2 (72.0)	22.5 (72.5)	25.2 (77.4)	26.8 (80.2)	28.7 (83.7)	30.1 (86.2)	31.3 (88.3)	27.7 (81.9)
Daily mean °C (°F)	25.8 (78.4)	25.2 (77.4)	24.3 (75.7)	21.6 (70.9)	17.8 (64.0)	16.5 (61.7)	15.9 (60.6)	17.9 (64.2)	19.9 (67.8)	22.4 (72.3)	23.7 (74.7)	25.2 (77.4)	21.3 (70.3)
Mean daily minimum °C (°F)	20.7 (69.3)	20.4 (68.7)	19.4 (66.9)	16.9 (62.4)	13.4 (56.1)	12.2 (54.0)	11.0 (51.8)	12.3 (54.1)	14.3 (57.7)	17.0 (62.6)	17.9 (64.2)	19.8 (67.6)	16.3 (61.3)
Record low °C (°F)	9.0 (48.2)	7.6 (45.7)	6.5 (43.7)	0.7 (33.3)	−3.3 (26.1)	−2.2 (28.0)	−4.8 (23.4)	−4.9 (23.2)	−1.4 (29.5)	2.9 (37.2)	5.6 (42.1)	3.9 (39.0)	−4.9 (23.2)
Average precipitation mm (inches)	180.1 (7.09)	149.9 (5.90)	153.3 (6.04)	161.1 (6.34)	185.5 (7.30)	145.5 (5.73)	107.0 (4.21)	83.7 (3.30)	155.3 (6.11)	247.0 (9.72)	172.3 (6.78)	219.0 (8.62)	1,959.7 (77.15)
Average precipitation days (≥ 0.1 mm)	10.0	9.6	8.7	8.2	8.9	8.5	8.1	6.4	9.2	12.2	9.1	10.3	109.1
Average relative humidity (%)	79.0	80.5	80.9	83.8	87.5	88.6	85.0	78.9	77.0	78.8	75.8	77.9	81.1
Mean monthly sunshine hours	201.5	183.6	173.6	168.0	130.2	111.0	139.5	170.5	132.0	161.2	198.0	189.1	1,958.2
Mean daily sunshine hours	6.5	6.5	5.6	5.6	4.2	3.7	4.5	5.5	4.4	5.2	6.6	6.1	5.4
Percentage possible sunshine	47	45	45	45	40	35	39	38	29	43	47	49	42
Source 1: Servicio Meteorológico Nacional
Source 2: UNLP (percent sun 1971–1980)

== Economy ==
The economy is centered around tourism: the city's many hotels provide the principal source of jobs for its inhabitants. Many international hotels have been and are being constructed along the banks of the Iguazú River.

Apart from the Iguazú Falls, other tourist attractions of the area include Three Frontiers, where the Argentine, Paraguayan and Brazilian borders meet. Puerto Iguazú is home to an active community of artisans, the La Aripuca resort, the Museum of Images of the Jungle (a collection of woodcarvings), the Mbororé Museum, the Luis Honorio Rolón Municipal Nature Park, the Güira Oga Center for Bird Rehabilitation, the Hotel Esturión, the Iguazú Grand Hotel and Casino, the Amérian Portal del Iguazú, and, south of Puerto Iguazú, the Sheraton Iguazú Resort & Spa.

The nearby Wanda Mines attract collectors of gemstones and geodes. Operating since the 1950s, the mines include some of Argentina's best agate, amethyst, quartz and topaz lodes.

== Transport ==
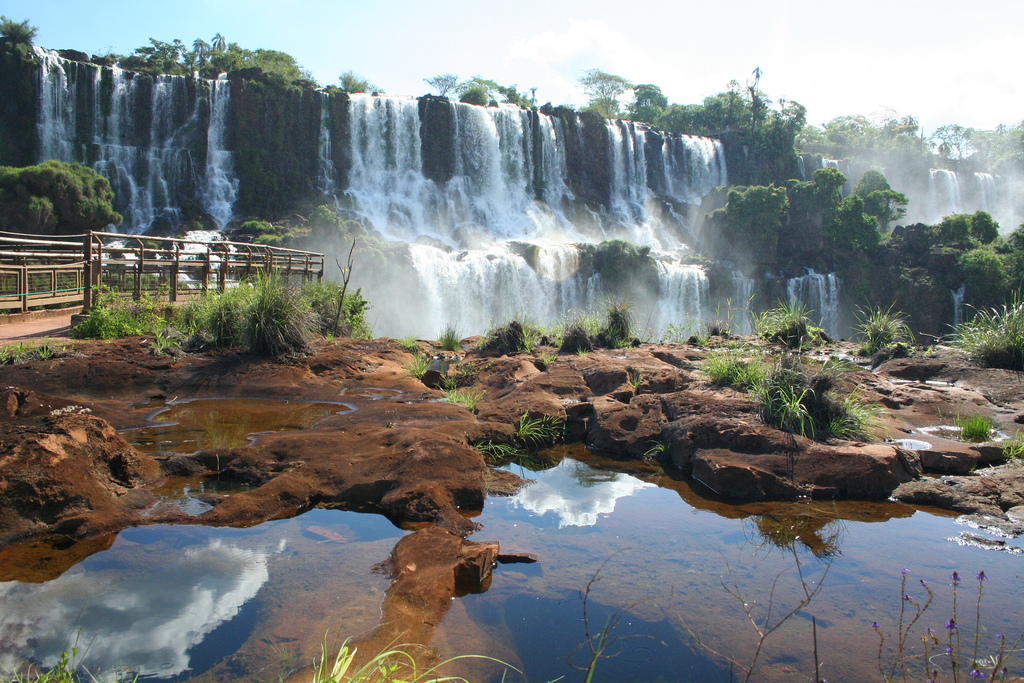
Iguazú Falls, near Puerto Iguazú

The Tancredo Neves International Bridge links Puerto Iguazú with the Brazilian border town of Foz do Iguaçu, where the Argentine National Route 12 becomes the Brazilian BR-469. From the main bus station one can take taxis, or the municipal bus, one of whose routes run from the Three Frontiers to Iguazú National Park (Parque Nacional de las Cataratas).

The city is served by its own international airport, Cataratas del Iguazú International Airport, as well as by Foz do Iguaçu International Airport on the Brazilian side of the border.

== Consular representations ==
The following countries have consular representations in Puerto Iguazú:

- Brazil (Consulate)
- Paraguay (Consulate)
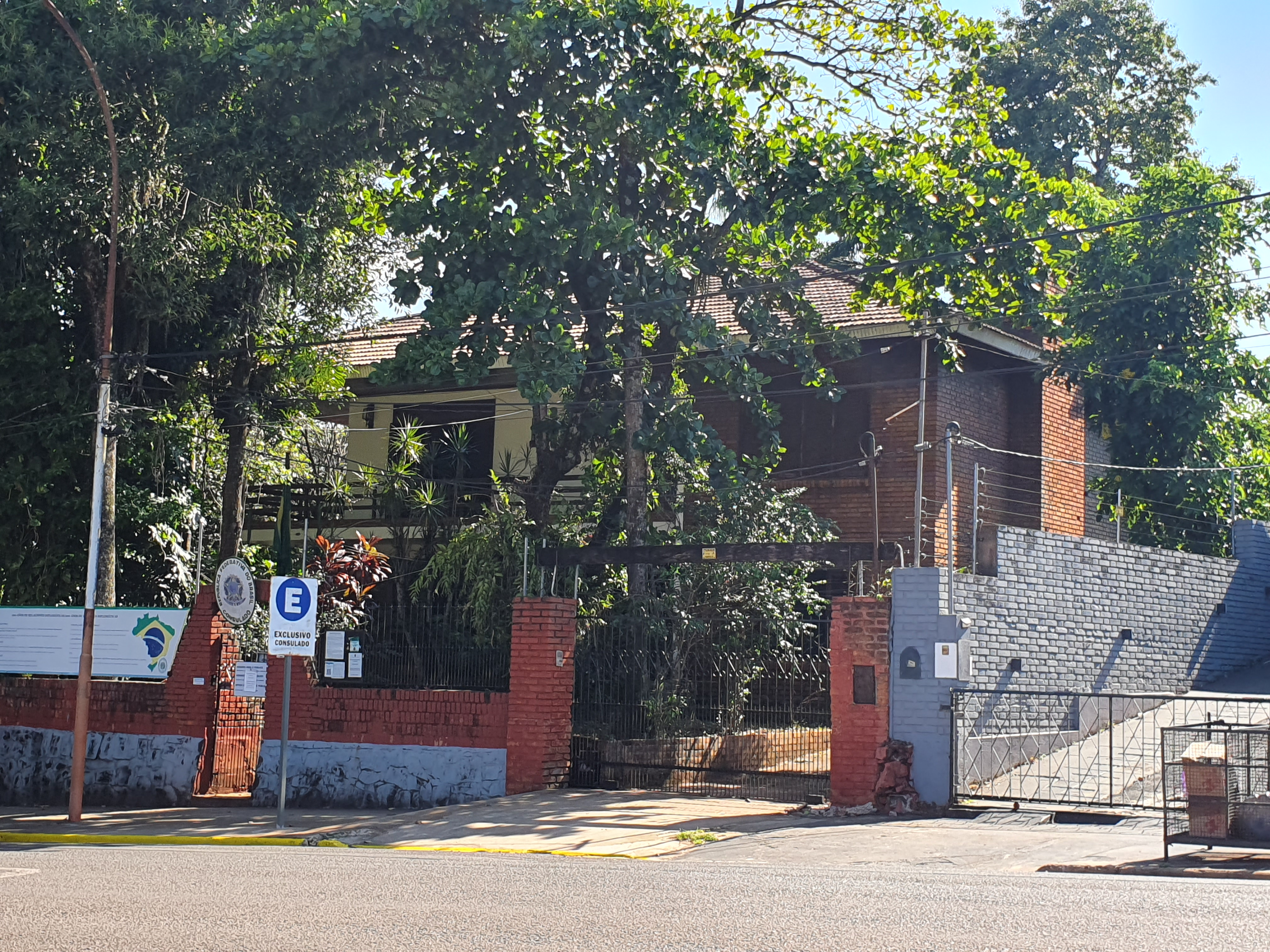
Consulate of Brazil

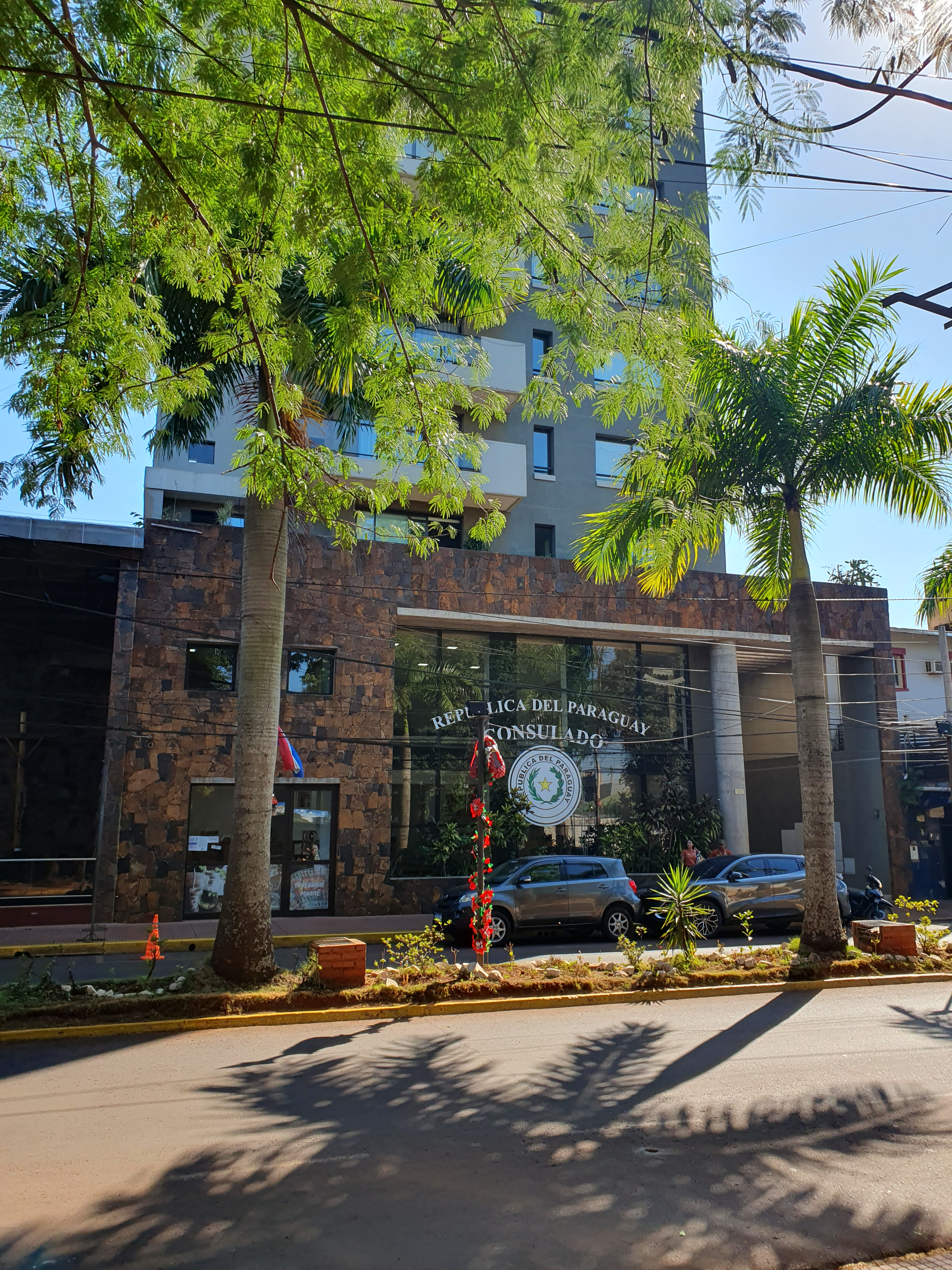
Consulate of Paraguay

== Ecology ==
The municipality contains the 12,620 hectares (31,200 acres) Iguazú National Reserve, created in 1970. One of the last remnants of the Atlantic Forest remains in and around the Iguazu Falls. This is a subtropical forest with native bamboos and a rich diversity of birds including toucans and hummingbirds. Coatis are accustomed to begging for food from park visitors. Most of the streets of Puerto Iguazu are unmetalled, red dirt, with gutters on either side (canalitos) that have grassy banks in which eels and a variety of freshwater fish, including knifefish (gymnotus) and catfish, inhabit. The canals drain into the Paraná River.

== Sister cities ==
- Ciudad del Este, Paraguay
- Presidente Franco, Paraguay

== See also ==
- Three Frontiers
- Fraternity Bridge
