= Devil's Throat =

Devil's Throat may refer to:

- Devil's Throat at Punta Sur, an underwater cave formation found near Cozumel
- Devil's Throat Cave, a cave in Bulgaria
- Devil's Throat, Iguazu Falls, a cliff at Iguazu Falls, Argentina
- Devil's Throat, a pit crater in Kilauea, Hawai`i
