= Hotel Gran Meliá Iguazú =

Hotel in Misiones Province, Argentina

Coordinates: 25°40′50″S 54°26′45″W

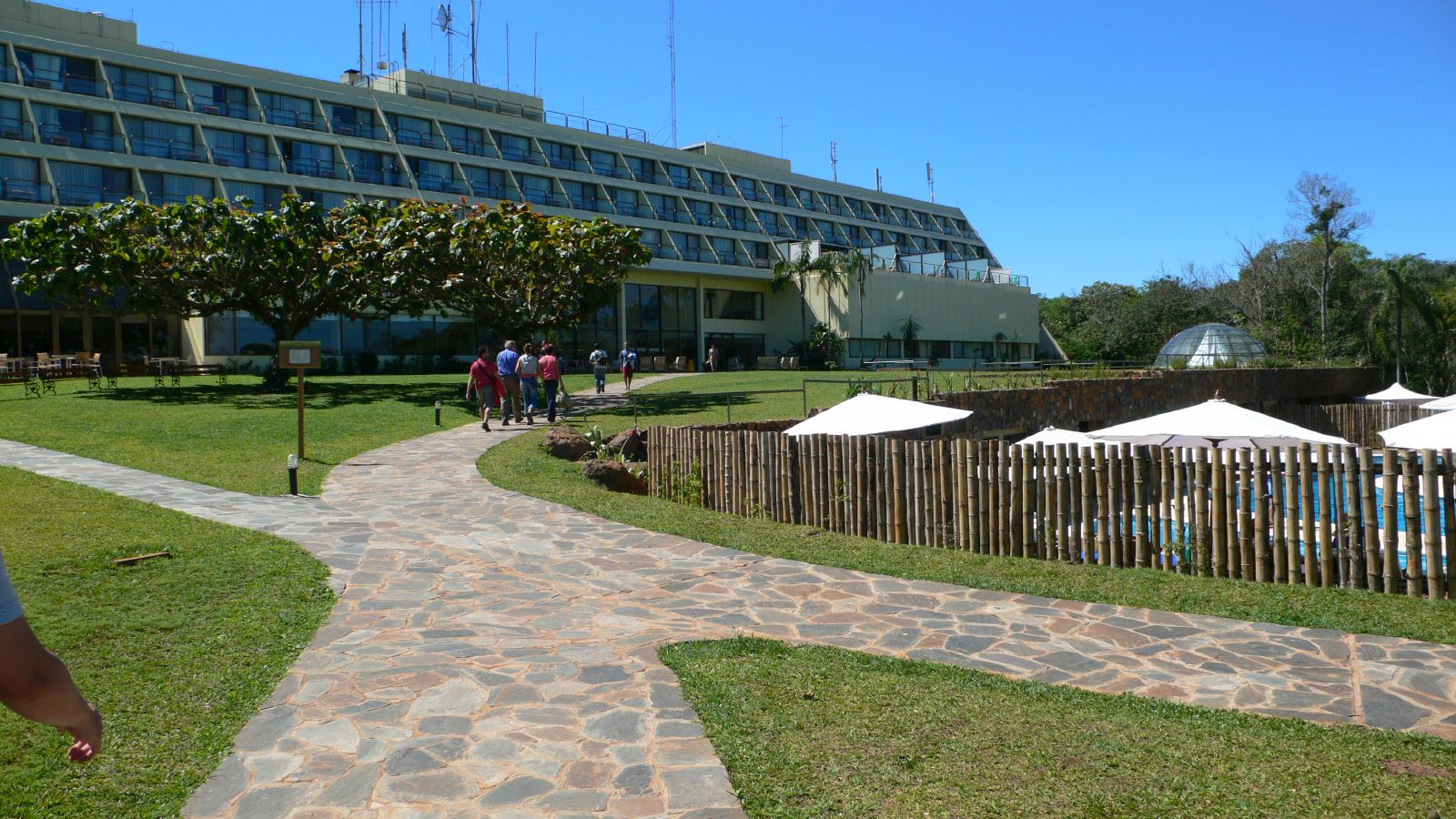
Hotel Gran Meliá Iguazú at Iguazú Falls

The Hotel Gran Meliá Iguazú is a five star establishment overlooking the landmark Iguazu Falls, in Misiones Province, Argentina.

== Overview ==
The hotel opened in 1978 as the Hotel Internacional Iguazú. The hotel itself was designed to complement the surrounding natural landscape and was built to coincide with Argentina’s hosting of the World Cup. In 1985 it served as the base for the three-month filming of the Academy Award-winning film The Mission. In 1998, Starwood took over management and it was renamed the Sheraton Internacional Iguazú. The hotel was extensively renovated in 2003 which included the addition of a spa. In 2006, the hotel was renamed Sheraton Iguazú Resort. The hotel was sold to a UAE-based investment group in August 2017 for $55 million. It left Sheraton on September 29, 2017 and joined Meliá Hotels International as the Hotel Meliá Iguazú. The hotel was renovated at a cost of $20 million and renamed Hotel Gran Meliá Iguazú in December 2018. It is located inside the Iguazú National Park, less than one mile from Devil's Throat. The Park is an ecological reserve offering various activities such as bird watching, hiking, rafting and horse riding.

An important facet of the Hotel Meliá Iguazú is its spa which includes a sauna, steam room, physiotherapy, reiki, shiatsu, mud baths, vichy shower, reflexology, various types of massage and other therapies, including herbal detoxification. The workout room is surrounded by lush forest and you can even see the falls while running on the treadmill. The 2018 renovation included the installation of a 50m x 15m infinity pool overlooking the falls and next to it, a second more shallow pool for family use.

The breakfast room, restaurant terrace and Lobby Bar, and rooftop level sunset bar “Alter”all offer unobstructed views of the Iguazú Falls. The hotel also maintains a convention center, as well as its 176 rooms and four suites. Guests booking the hotel’s RedLevel rooms have access to the RedLevel lounge which in addition to having a private terrace with views of the falls, offers a range of complimentary food and beverage items.
