= Devil's Throat, Iguazu Falls =

Cataract at the border of Brazil and Argentina

Coordinates: 25°41′45″S 54°26′10″W

Devil's Throat
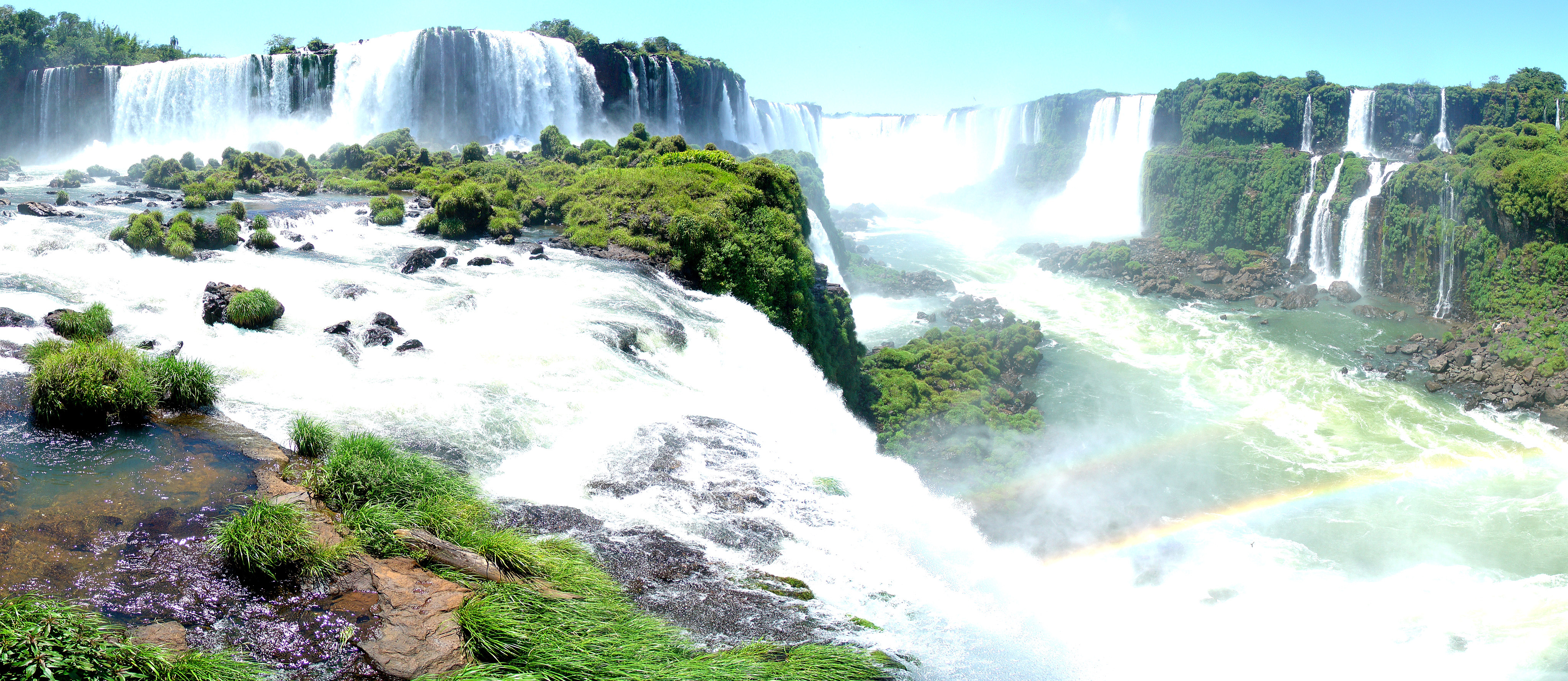
- Devil's Throat
- Location: Iguazú National Park / Iguaçu National Park, Brazil / Argentina

The Devil's Throat (Spanish: Garganta del Diablo, Portuguese: Garganta do Diabo) is a waterfall on the Iguazu River at the border of Brazil and Argentina.

It is shared by the Argentine Iguazú National Park and the Brazilian Iguaçu National Park and accessible by the Rainforest Ecological Train, whose nearby station is called Garganta.

== Geography ==
The Devil's Throat situated with the border between Brazil and Argentina intersecting 23 kilometers upstream from the confluence of Iguazu River to Parana River over the edge of the Parana Plateau. It is a U-shaped chasm. The Devil's Throat receives approximately half of the river's flow, standing 82 meters high, 150 meters wide, and extending 700 meters in length.

== Gallery ==
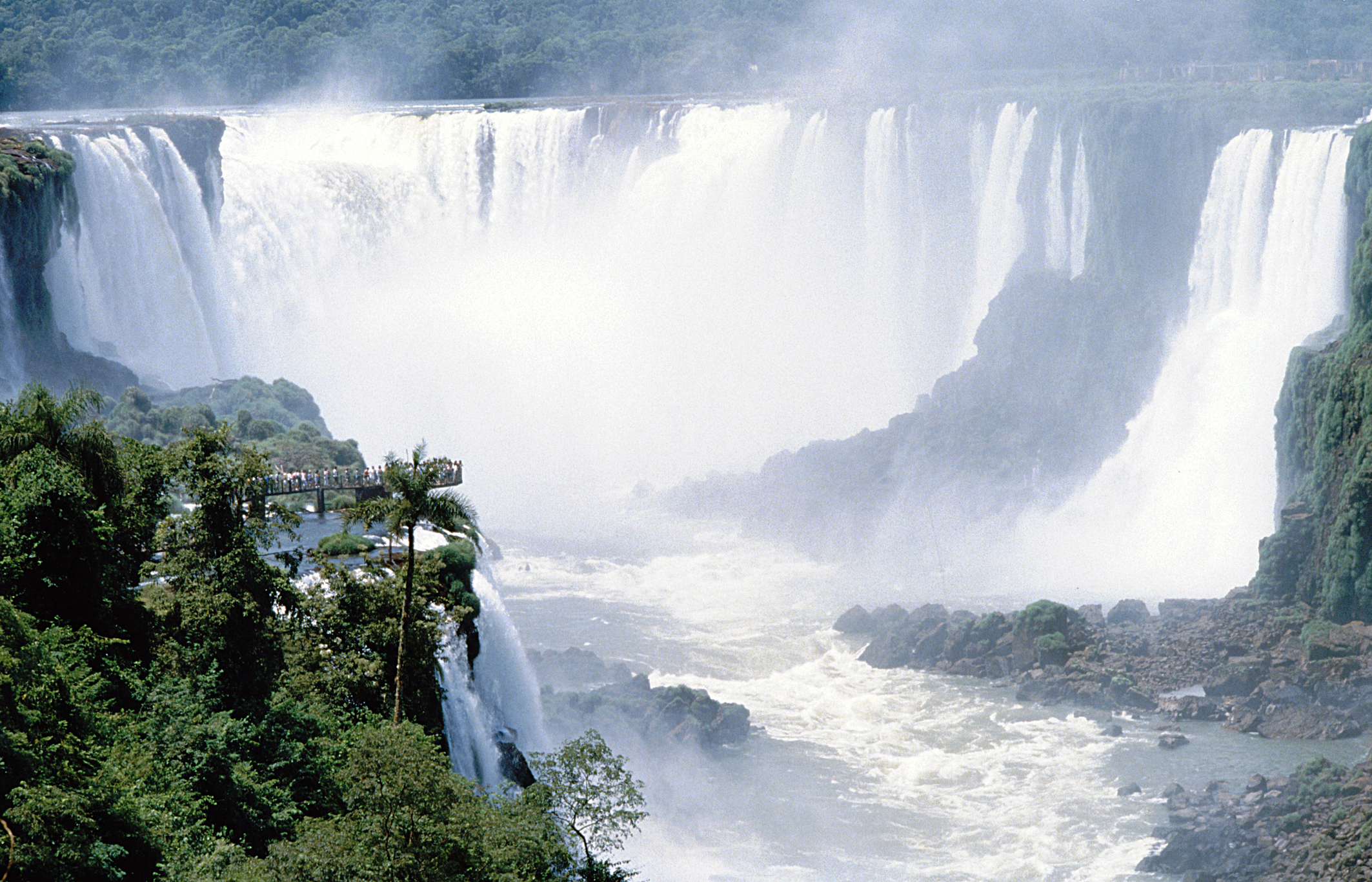
Devil's Throat in the center of Iguazu Falls.

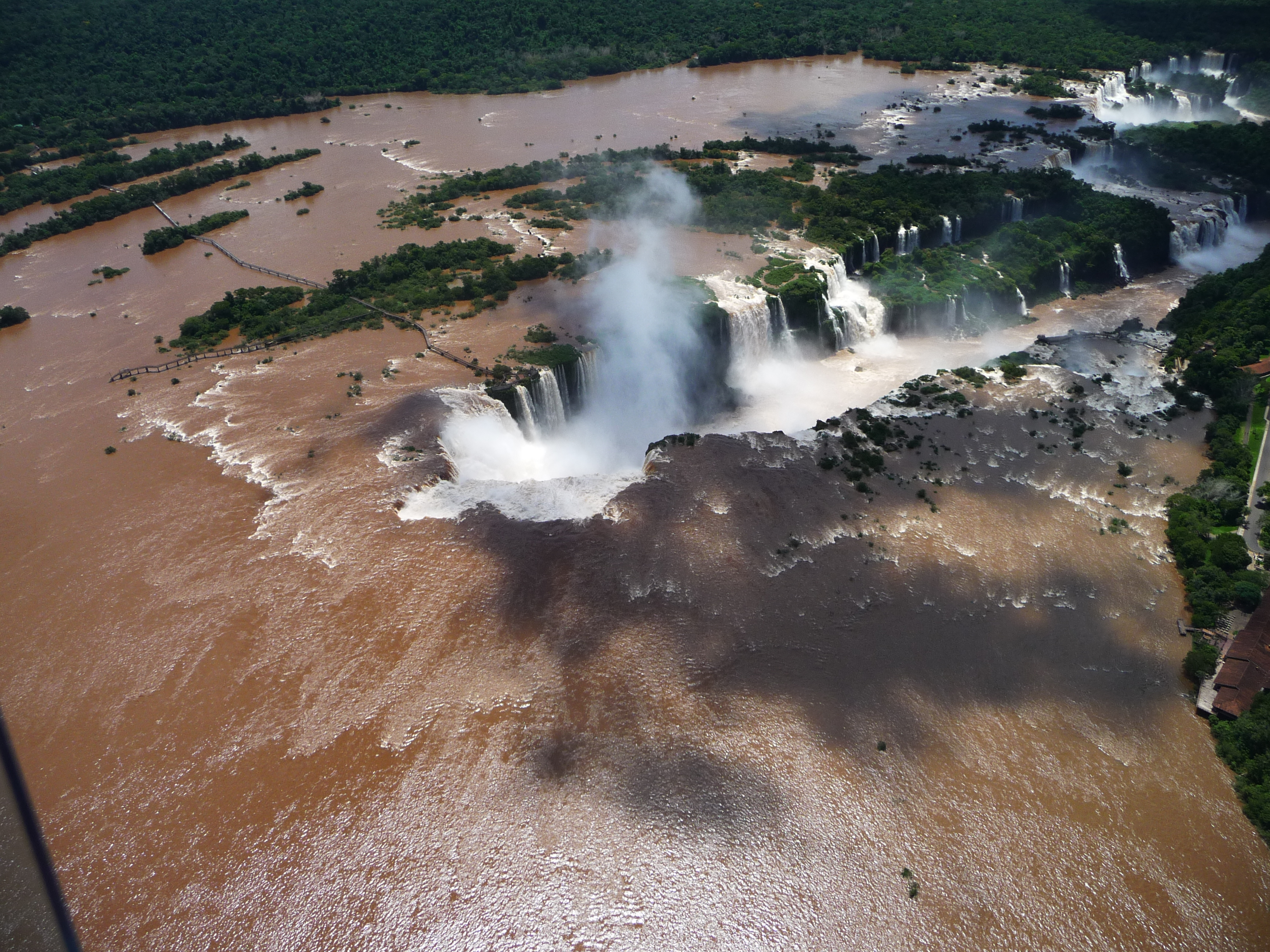
Aerial view of the Devil's Throat.

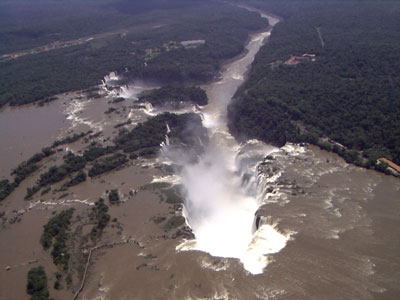
Devil's Throat.

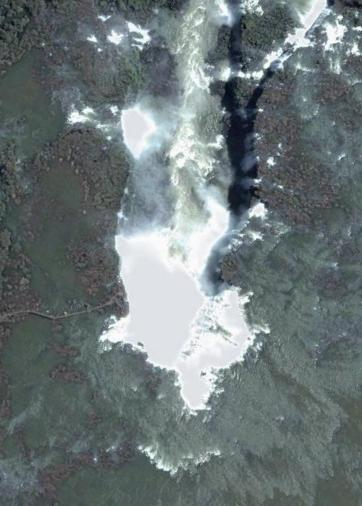
Satellite image.

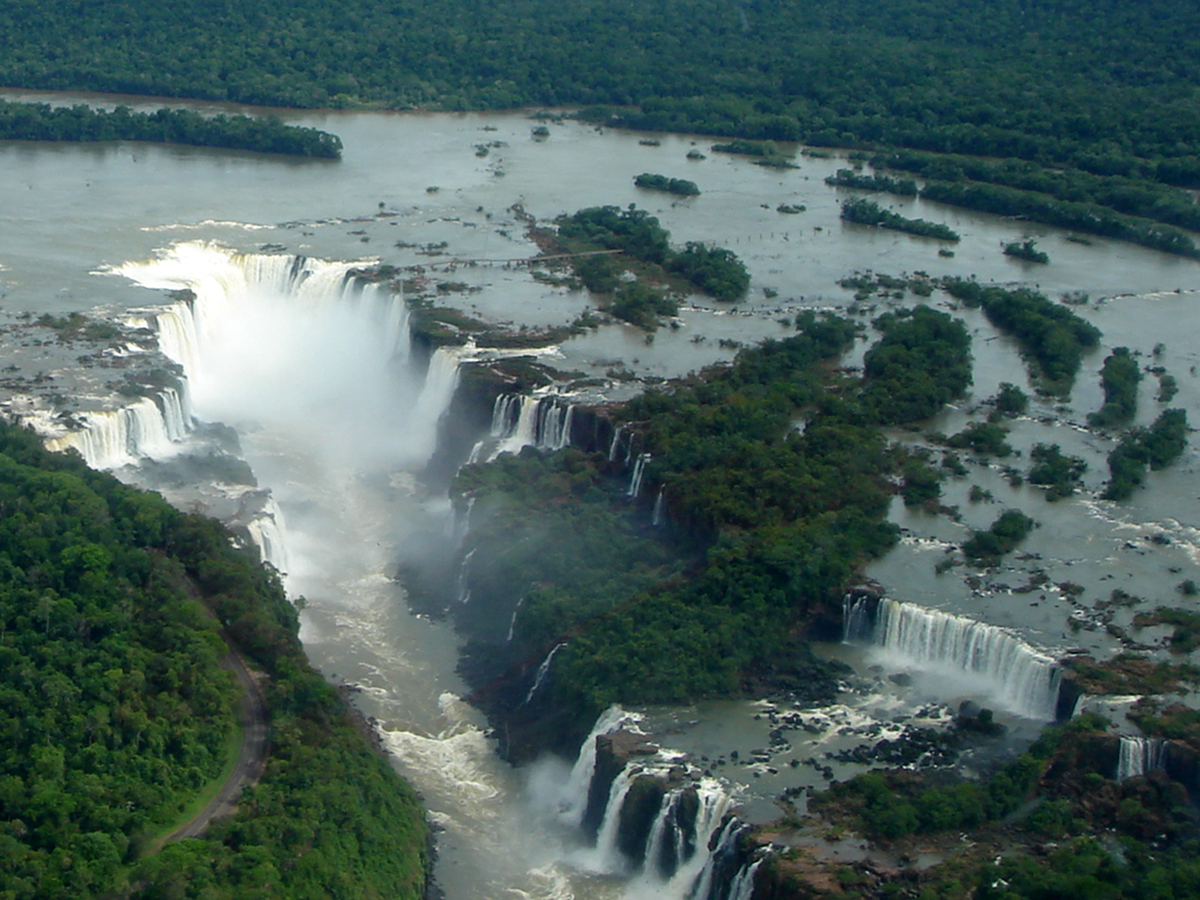
Devil's Throat and other falls.

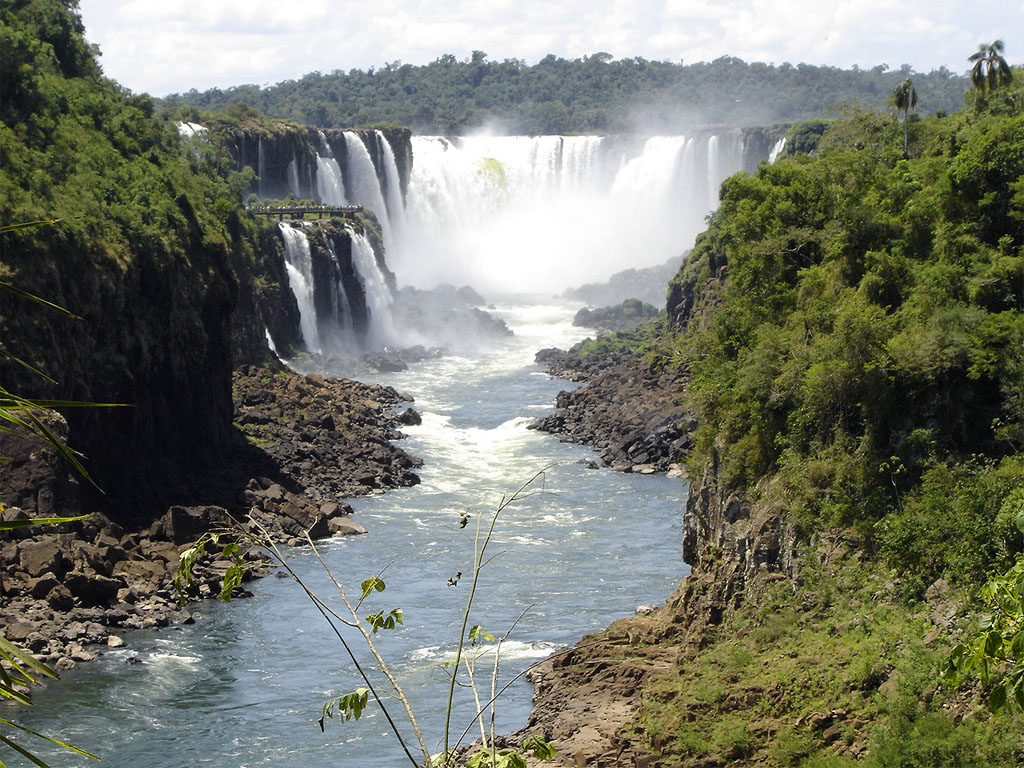
In the distance.

== See also ==
- Isla de San Martín
- Triple Frontier
