= Triple Frontier =

Tri-border area of Paraguay, Argentina and Brazil

Coordinates: 25°35′33″S 054°35′35″W

Location of the Triple Frontier.

The Triple Frontier (Spanish: Triple Frontera, Portuguese: Tríplice Fronteira) is a tri-border area along the junction of Argentina, Brazil and Paraguay, where the Iguazú and Paraná rivers converge. Near the confluence are the cities of Puerto Iguazú (Argentina), Foz do Iguaçu (Brazil) and Ciudad del Este (Paraguay). This area is near Iguazú Falls and the Itaipu hydroelectric plant.

== Population ==
All together, the population of the Triple Frontier adds up to about 950,000 people, making this region the tripoint with the highest population in the world. The population in the Triple Frontier is concentrated in three border cities, with the majority of the region's population living on the Paraguayan side of the border. Of the three major border cities, the largest is Ciudad del Este in Paraguay, which in 2018 had a population of 299,255. Meanwhile, the tourist-centric Brazilian city Foz do Iguaçu has a population of approximately 258,248 (2020) and Puerto Iguazú, Argentina is the smallest of the three cities, with a population of just 82,227.

In the metropolitan region of the Paraguayan side, Presidente Franco has a population in 2018 of 98,805; Hernandarias, 79,036; and Minga Guazú, 86,755.

The Arab community and other Asian immigrant communities, which make up an important part of the urban population in the Triple Frontier, are estimated to number approximately 30,000.

View from the Argentine side of the border.

== Tourism ==
The Triple Frontier is an important tourist area, within the touristic subregion of the Región de las Aguas Grandes. Visitors can see the Tancredo Neves bridge, which connects the Argentine city of Puerto Iguazú and its Brazilian neighbor, Foz do Iguaçu. At the convergence of the borders, each of the three bordering countries has erected an obelisk, painted in the national colors of the country in which it is located. All three countries can be seen from each of the obelisks.

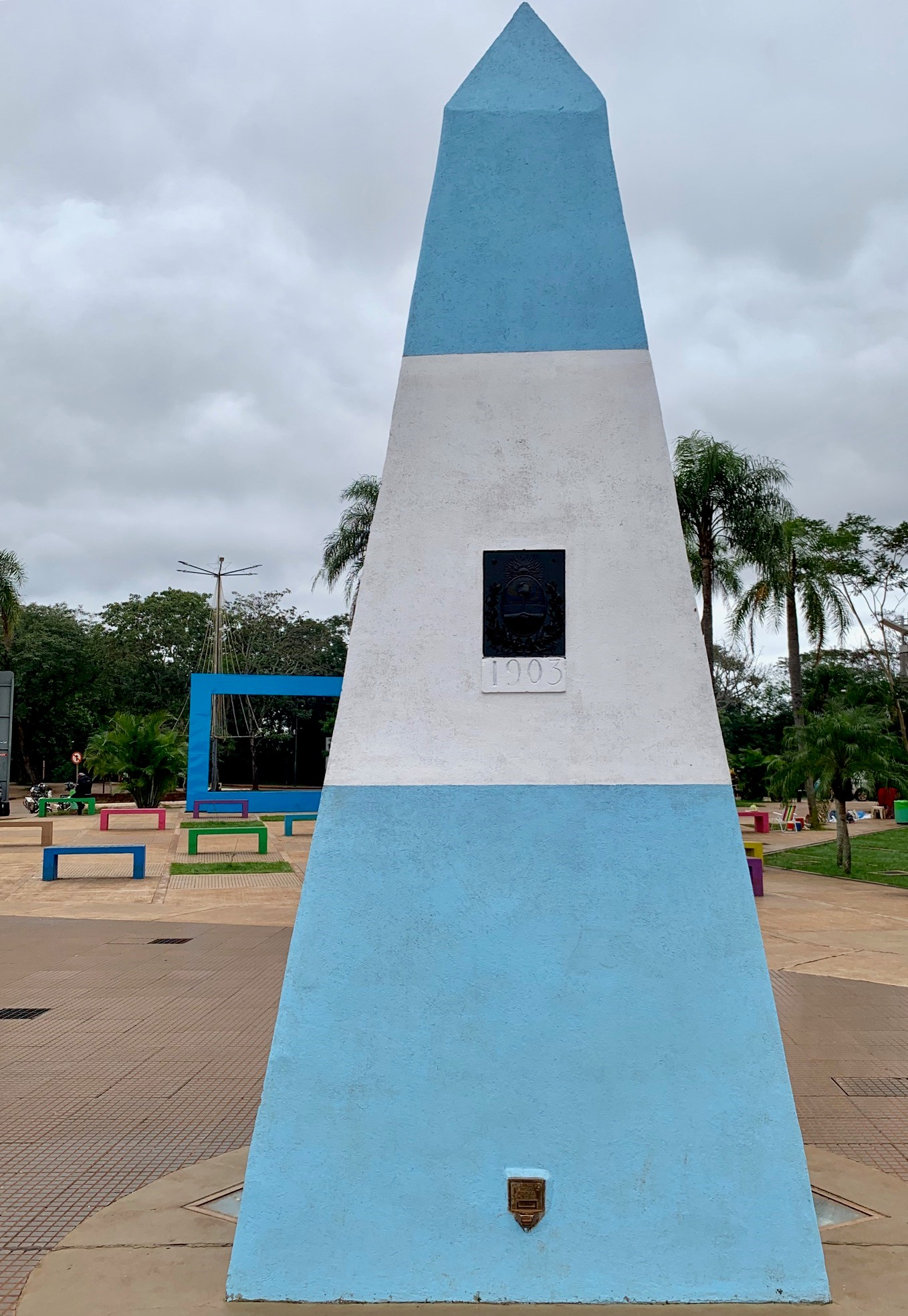
Argentine Obelisk

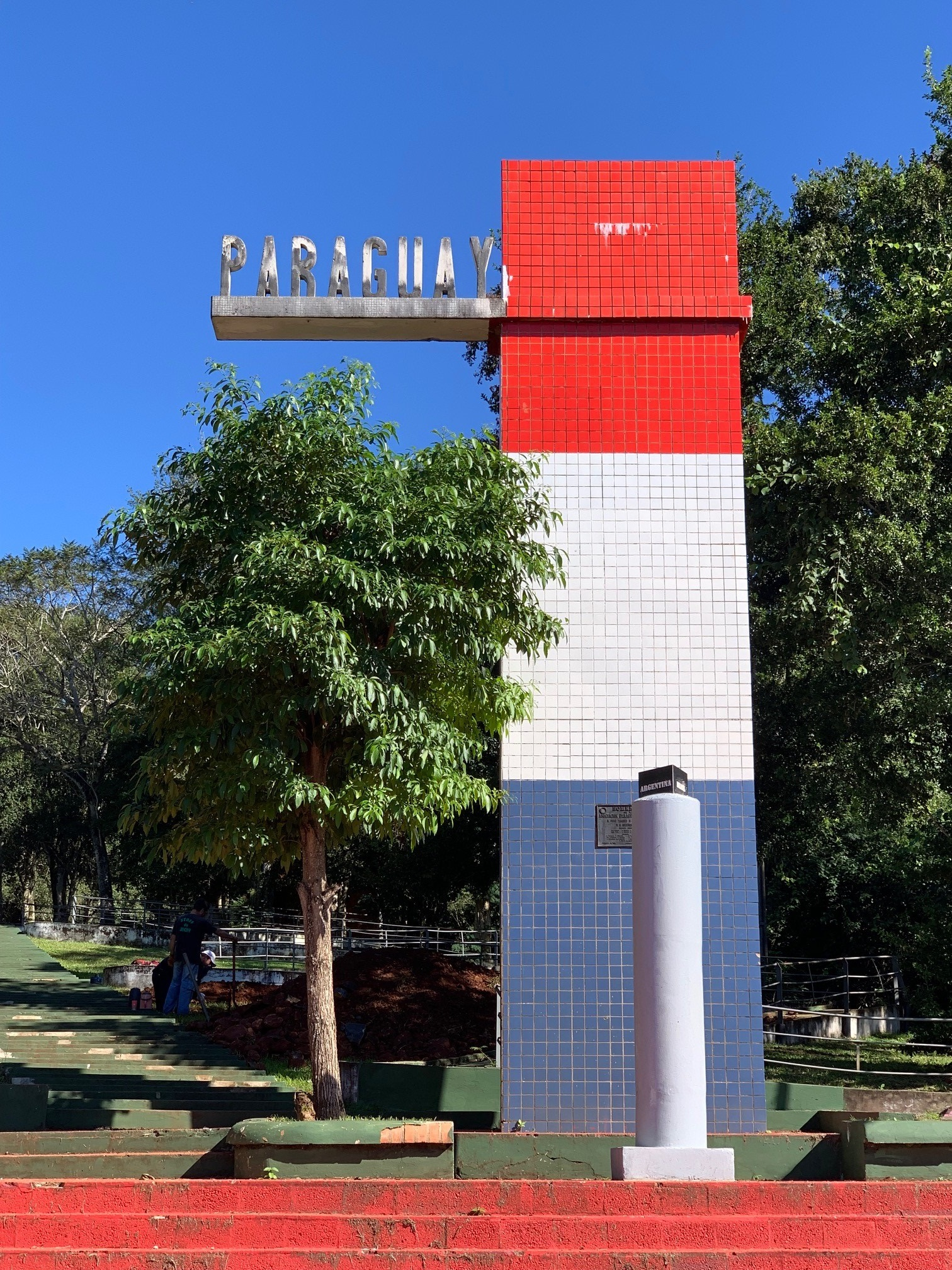
Paraguay Obelisk

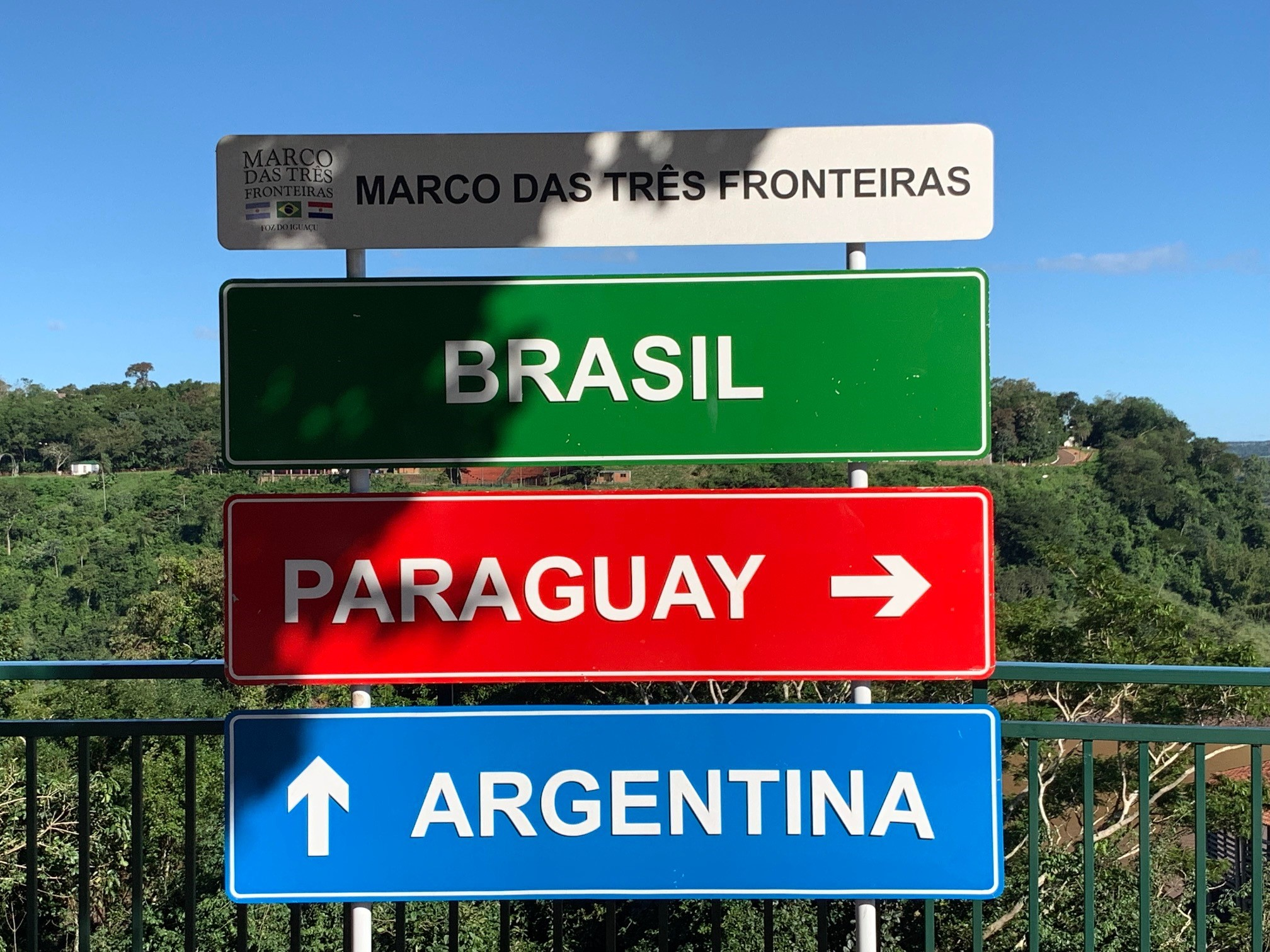
Signpost on Brazilian side noting the triple frontier

The Guarani Aquifer is arguably the biggest reservoir of fresh, potable water in the world—right under Triple Border soil (Brazil, Argentina and Paraguay). The majority (71%) of its 1.2 million square kilometers lies in Brazil.

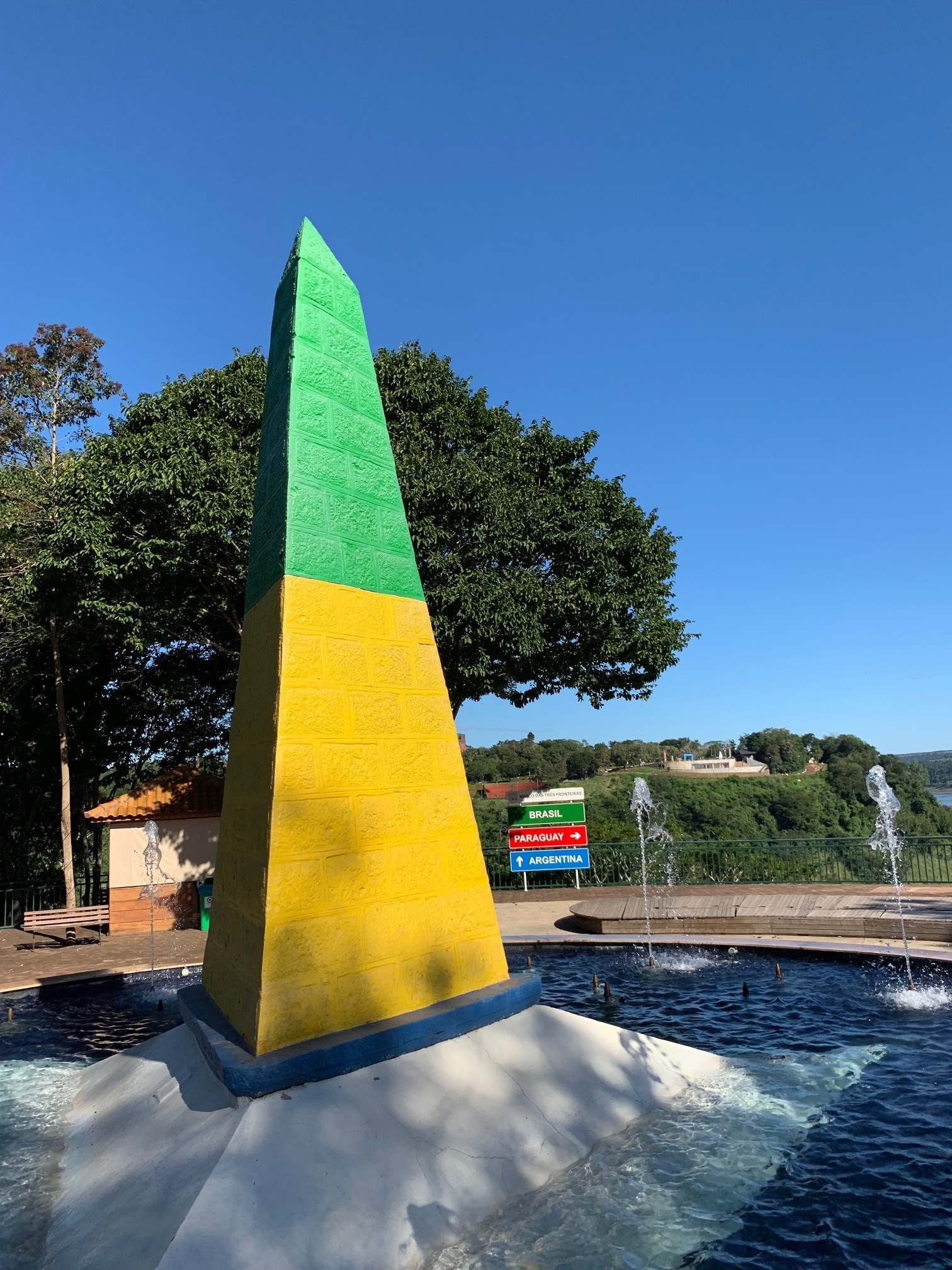
Brazilian Obelisk

== Security ==
The George W. Bush administration cited "clear examples" of Islamic groups in the tri-border region in 2002 that "finance terrorist activities." Paraguayan authorities alleged Hezbollah and Hamas were operating in the Triple Frontier, among the local population of Arab origin. However, no evidence supporting this claim was ever publicised and local politicians pointed out that no individuals had ever been convicted of terrorist activities. Paraguayo Cubas, the former mayor of Ciudad del Este, compared the search for Islamist terrorists in the region following 2001 to the Red Scares of earlier decades.

The particular geography of the border region, rampant political corruption and weak judicial system make it very difficult to monitor organized crime and the illicit activities connected with it. To U.S. officials and law enforcement familiar with the region, "Iranian-backed Hezbollah militia have been fostering a well-financed force of Islamist radicals in the region".

A counter-terrorism expert with the Pentagon's National Security Study Group described the Tri-border in 2007 as "the most important base for Hezbollah outside Lebanon itself, home to a community of dangerous fanatics that send their money to financially support Hezbollah." Of the 25,000 Lebanese Arabs who live in the region, not all support terrorism, but many openly acknowledge they send money to Hezbollah and that Shiite mosques have "an obligation to finance it".

The Paraguayan authorities say they have evidence that money is being sent to organizations with terrorist connections because of the amount of money leaving Paraguay for the Middle East, said Carlos Altemburger, Chief of the Department for the Prevention and Investigation of Terrorism in Paraguay. In response to the situation, Paraguay approved the entry of 400 US soldiers "for joint military exercises, such as programs on fighting urban terrorists, public security and humanitarian assistance", according to The Washington Post. However, in October 2006 Paraguay decided not to renew a defense-cooperation agreement.

Foz do Iguaçu tourist groups dispute the reports of terrorist activity in the region, as has the U.S. State Department. Since 1996, the Tripartite Command of the Triple Frontier, which coordinates monitoring tasks among the three bordering countries, has been operating from Foz do Iguaçu. The 3+1 Group was created between Argentina, Brazil, Paraguay, and the United States (the "1"), in 2002 to further strengthen security in the region. In 2005, the governments of the three nations stated they would set up a joint intelligence center in Foz do Iguaçu specifically to monitor the situation.

== In popular culture ==
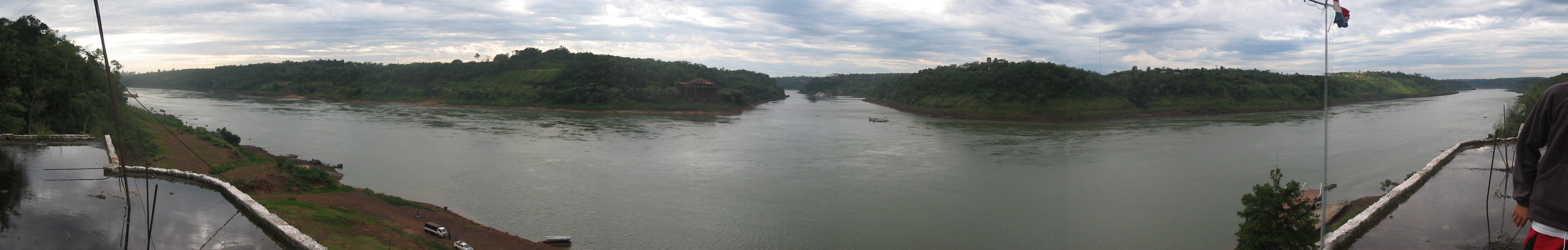
Panorama from the Paraguayan side of the border.

- The Triple Frontier (or here referenced as the Tri-Border Area) is featured as the backdrop for the NCIS episode "An Eye for an Eye", as NCIS Special Agents Anthony DiNozzo and Caitlin Todd must travel down to this area of southern Paraguay in order to investigate a professor involved in a case in which a pair of blue eyeballs were mailed to a murder victim.
- The Mission (1986 film) is set in this region in the 1750s.
- The Triple Frontier is also featured as the location for The Unit episode "The Kill Zone", where Unit operators must rescue a member of their counterpart team, Team Charlie, during a hostage situation.
- In the Vince Flynn novel Extreme Measures, a terrorist group funded by al-Qaeda trains and plans to execute terrorist attacks on America while living in the Triple Frontier.
- In the Brad Taylor novel Shadow Strike, a terrorist group funded by Iran trains in the Tri-Border area for a mission to assassinate the Israeli Prime Minister who comes to Buenos Aires Argentina for a speech.
- In the 2006 film Miami Vice, Sonny Crockett and Rico Tubbs first meet with the drug cartel they are trying to infiltrate in the Tri-Border Area.
- Featured in the Human Target episode "The Return of Baptiste", as the location where a kidnapped reporter is held by a crime lord. The accents and geography shown in the episode are inaccurate for this region.
- Included as a major setting of the location for the Sebastian Rotella novel Triple Crossing.
- Season 1, episode 7 ("Borderlines") of SEAL Team revolves around a mission to the Tri-Border Area.
- Season 2, Episode 11 (Day I Met the Devil) Magnum P.I. Magnum is called up from the reserves for a top secret mission, but his friends are stunned when they learn that the mission is a lie and Magnum has been set up. (TV-14 L, V) Air Date: Dec 13, 2019
- The events of the 2023 Brazilian police drama Criminal Code is set in the Triple Frontier concerning cross border crime between Paraguay and Brazil

== See also ==
- Universidade Federal da Integração Latino-Americana (UNILA)
- Universidade Estadual do Oeste do Paraná (Western Paraná State University [Unioeste])
- Tripoint
