= Iguazú National Reserve =

National reserve in Misiones Province, Argentina

- Reserva Nacional Iguazú
- Location within Argentina
- Nearest city: Puerto Iguazú, Misiones
- Coordinates: 25.655331°S 54.488344°W
- Area: 12,620 hectares (31,200 acres)
- Designation: National reserve
- Created: 7 October 1970

The Iguazú National Reserve (Spanish: Reserva Nacional Iguazú) is a national reserve in the Misiones Province of northeastern Argentina.

== Location ==
The Iguazú National Reserve is in the municipality of Puerto Iguazú. It has an area of 12,620 hectares (31,200 acres). The reserve may be accessed via RN12 to its junction with RN101, which leads to the reserve. It has generally the same flora and fauna as the Iguazú National Park, which it adjoins. While the national park preserves nature with the least possible alteration, the reserve admits human activities and infrastructure. Both would be part of the proposed Trinational Biodiversity Corridor, which aims to provide forest connections between conservation units in Brazil, Paraguay and Argentina in the Upper Paraná ecoregion.

== History ==
The Iguazú National Reserve was defined by law 18.801 of 7 October 1970 as constituting the western part of the Iguazú National Park, created in 1941. It had the objective of protecting a representative environment of Alto Paraná Atlantic forests and its biodiversity. Creation of the reserve allowed construction of an international airport and alienation of land for three tourist hotels. The Iguazu National Park and the Iguazú National Reserve were declared a World Natural Heritage Site by UNESCO in 1984.

== Sources ==
- Araújo Corte, Dione Angélica de; Valladares-Pádua, Cláudio Benedito (November 2007), Plano de Manejo da Estação Ecológica Mico-Leão-Preto (PDF) (in Portuguese), Brasília: ICMBio, archived from the original (PDF) on 2016-11-07
- "Cataratas del Iguazú y el Río Iguazú", ArgentinaXplora (in Spanish)
- "Iguazú: Antecedentes Normativos - Límites", Patrimonionatural.com (in Spanish)
- Levingston, Moyano LLerena (7 October 1970), Declaracion y Deslinde de la Reserva Nacional Iguazu del Parque Nacional Iguazu (in Spanish)
- "Reserva Nacional Iguazú (AICA)", Ruta de la Selva (in Spanish), archived from the original on 2016-11-10
