= Tancredo Neves Bridge =

Fraternity Bridge
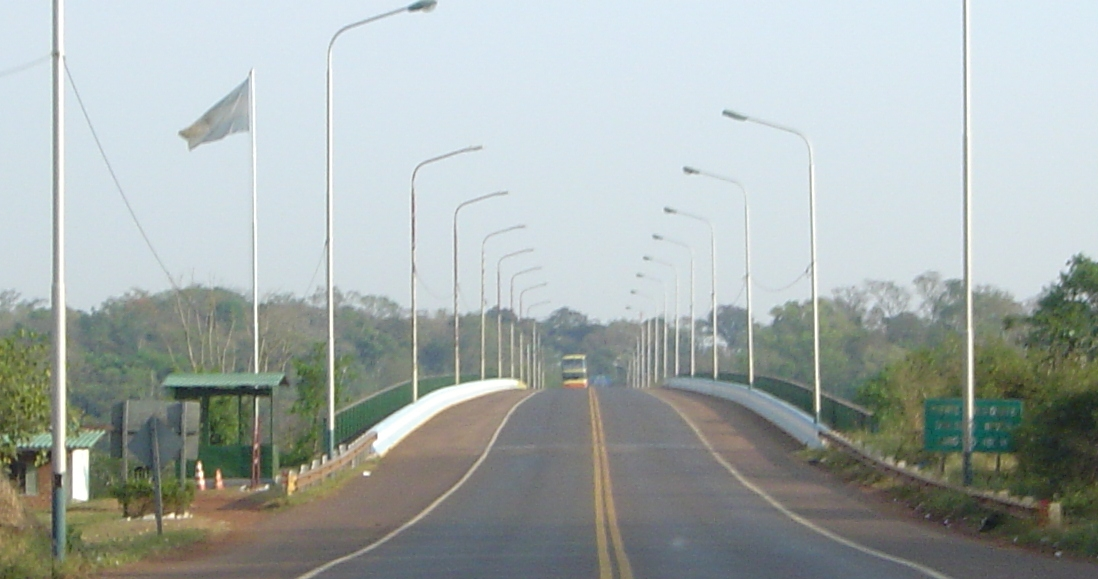
- Coordinates: 25.588933°S 54.561570°W
- Carries: vehicular traffic
- Crosses: Iguassu River
- Locale: Foz do Iguaçu to Puerto Iguazú
- Official name: Tancredo Neves Bridge

Characteristics
- Design: hollow box, haunched Cantilever bridge
- Total length: 489 metres (1,604 ft)
- Width: 16.5 metres (54 ft)
- Height: 70 metres (230 ft)
- Longest span: 220 metres (720 ft)
- Clearance below: 65.38 metres (214.5 ft)

History
- Construction start: 1982-01-13
- Opened: 1985-11-29

Location
- Interactive map of Fraternity Bridge

The Tancredo Neves Bridge, better known as Fraternity Bridge (Portuguese: Ponte da Fraternidade, Spanish: Puente de la Fraternidad), is a bridge that connects the Brazilian city of Foz do Iguaçu with the Argentine Puerto Iguazú, spanning the Iguazú River. Measuring 489 meters long, 16.5 meters wide, and 70 meters high, it began with a 1972 letter of intent and officially opened on November 29, 1985. It was named after Tancredo Neves, a Brazilian politician, despite early proposals by local Argentine officials to name it "Santa Maria".

== Description ==
Spanning the Iguazú River from Brazil's BR 469 highway, this bridge connects Foz do Iguaçu, Brazil, and Puerto Iguazú, Argentina. It is 489 meters (1,604 feet) long, 16.5 meters (54 feet) wide, and 70 metres (230 feet) high.

== History ==
The bridges were initially constructed under a letter of intent signed by Alejandro Agustín Lanusse and Emilio Garrastazu Medici in 1972. After seven years, the project continued with a meeting between stakeholders from Foz do Iguaçu and Puerto Iguazú to create the Pro-Construction Commission, which led to the creation of an official Brazilian-Argentine Joint Commission in Buenos Aires in 1980. Finally, in 1982, the contract was formally signed and officially started in 1983, when Reynaldo Bignone and João Baptista de Oliveira Figueiredo laid the cornerstone over the Iguazú River and issued the service order to a corporate consortium. The construction was finally completed on 29 November 1985, when Raúl Alfonsín and José Sarney officially inaugurated the bridges.

It was named after Brazilian politician Tancredo Neves. Though at first, it was rejected by Roberto Velasques, governor of Puerto Iguazú and endorsed by Hernan Scappini and Luis Honorio Rolónt who had held the position of president and vice-president of the City Council. As an alternative, they proposed named of Santa Maria as name of the bridge.

== See also ==
- List of international bridges
