= Iguazú National Park =

National park in Argentina

- IUCN category II (national park)
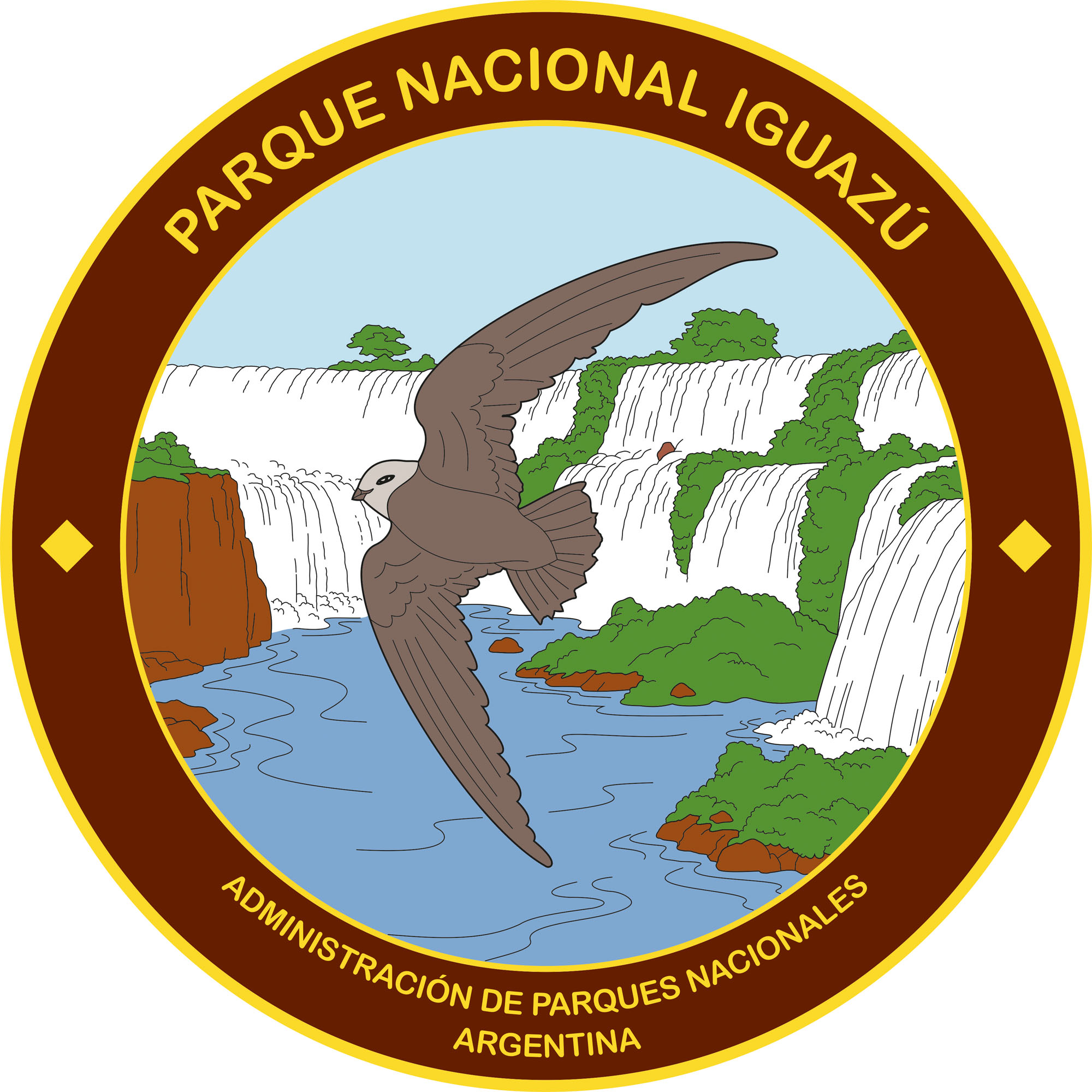
- Emblem of the Iguazú National Park

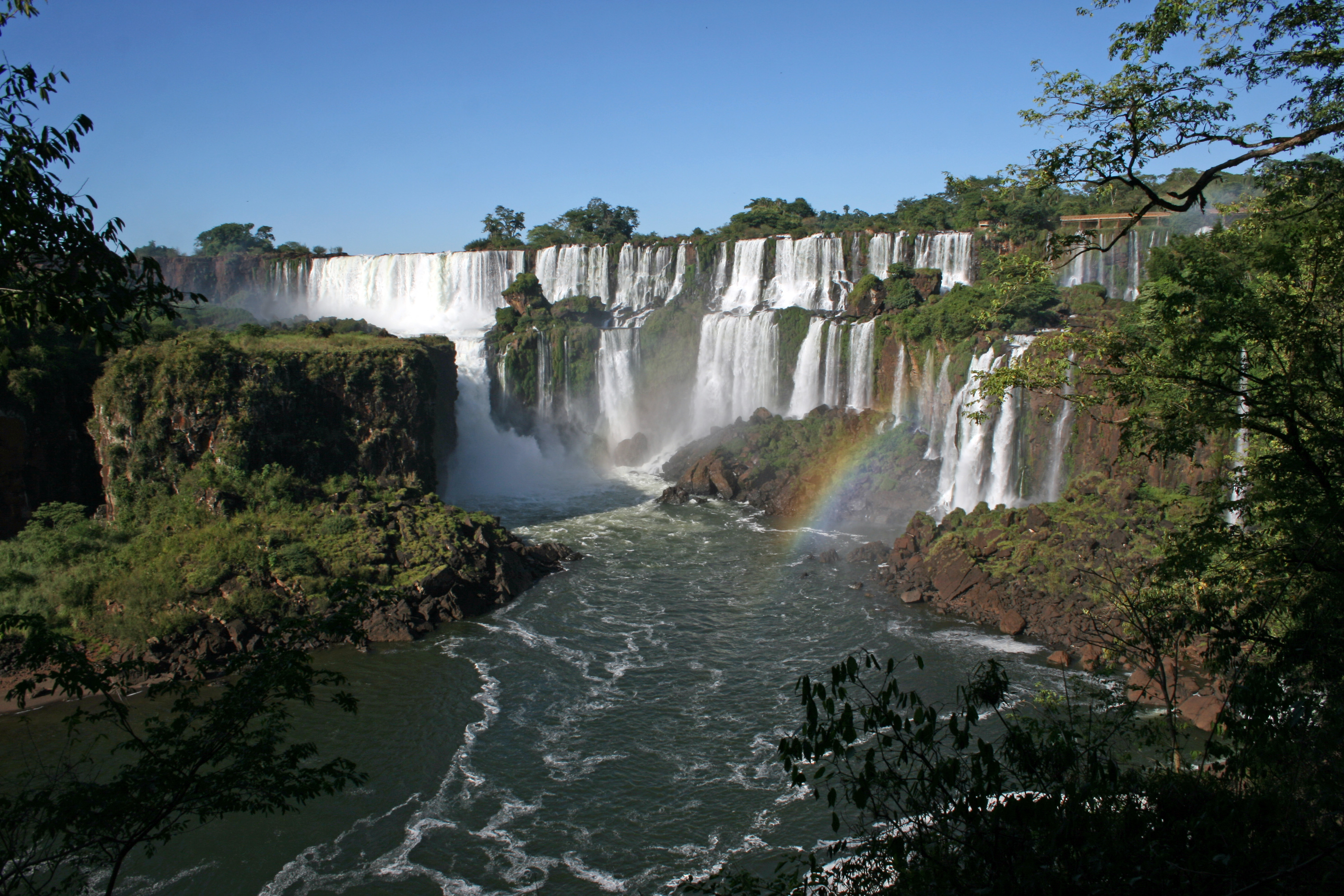
- View of a section of the waterfall

- Location within Argentina
- Location: Misiones Province, Argentina
- Coordinates: 25°37′S 54°20′W
- Area: 677 km^{2} (261 sq mi)
- Established: 1934
- Governing body: Administración de Parques Nacionales

UNESCO World Heritage Site
- Type: Natural
- Criteria: vii, x
- Designated: 1984 (8th session)
- Reference no.: 303
- Region: Latin America and the Caribbean

The Iguazú National Park (Spanish: Parque Nacional Iguazú) is a national park of Argentina, located in the Iguazú Department, in the north of the province of Misiones, Argentine Mesopotamia. It has an area of 677 km^{2} (261 sq mi).

== History ==
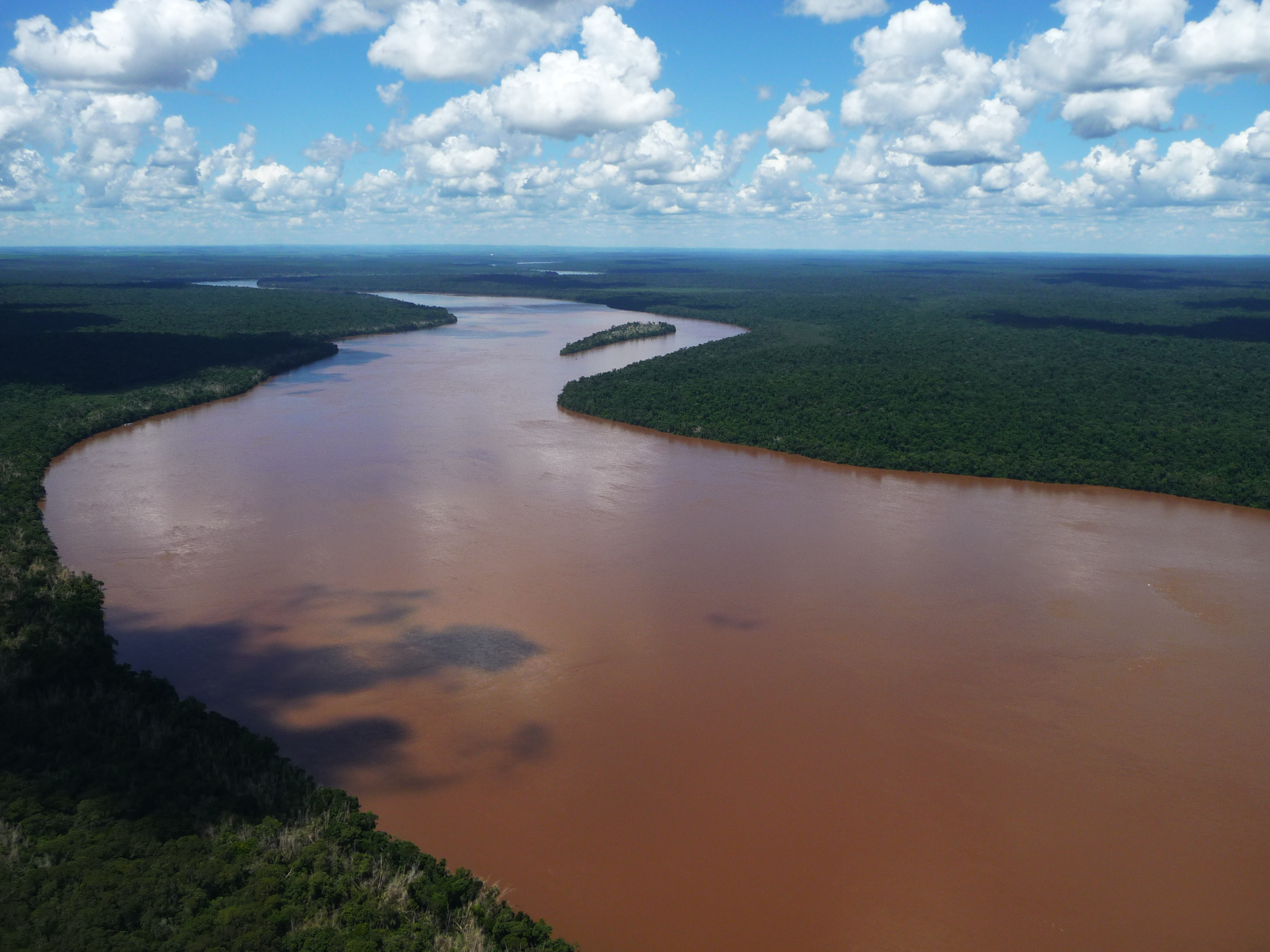
Aerial view of the Iguazu River.

The area of the park was inhabited 10,000 years ago by the hunter-gatherers of the Eldoradense culture. They were displaced around 1,000 CE by the Guaraní, who brought new agricultural technologies, and were displaced in turn by the Spanish and Portuguese conquistadores in the 16th century, though their legacy is still alive in this area (the name of the park and the river is Guaraní y guasu, "large water"). The first European to visit the zone was Álvar Núñez Cabeza de Vaca, in 1542; Jesuit missions followed in 1609.

The park was created in 1934 to protect one of the greatest natural beauties of Argentina, the Iguazu Falls, surrounded by the subtropical jungle.

The Iguazú National Reserve was defined by law 18.801 of 7 October 1970 as constituting the western part of the Iguazú National Park. While the national park preserves nature with the least possible alteration, the reserve admits human activities and infrastructure. Creation of the reserve allowed construction of an international airport and alienation of land for three tourist hotels. Across the Iguazu River lies its Brazilian counterpart (Iguaçu National Park). Both sites were declared World Heritage Sites by UNESCO, in 1984.

The park would be part of the proposed Trinational Biodiversity Corridor, which aims to provide forest connections between conservation units in Brazil, Paraguay and Argentina in the Upper Paraná ecoregion. The southeast of the park adjoins the 84,000 hectares (210,000 acres) Urugua-í Provincial Park, created in 1990.

== Fauna ==
The park lies within the Alto Paraná Atlantic forests ecoregion. The fauna of the park includes several rare and threatened species: jaguar, jaguarundi, South American tapir, ocelot, tirica, anteater, the black-fronted piping guan, the harpy eagle, and the yacare caiman. One can also find birds like the great dusky swift and large toucans, mammals like the coatí, and a diversity of butterflies. The vinaceous amazon, named for its wine-colored plumage, is occasionally found in this park.

The Iguazú River ends in the Paraná River 23 km beyond the falls, after a 1320 km course. Inside the park it becomes up to 1,500 m wide and turns first south, then north, forming a large U-shape. Its banks are densely populated by trees, including the ceibo (Cockspur coral tree), whose flower is Argentina's national flower. The flora of the park also features lapacho negro and lapacho amarillo (family Bignoniaceae), as well as palmito trees and the 40-metre-high palo rosa (family Apocynaceae).

== Gallery ==
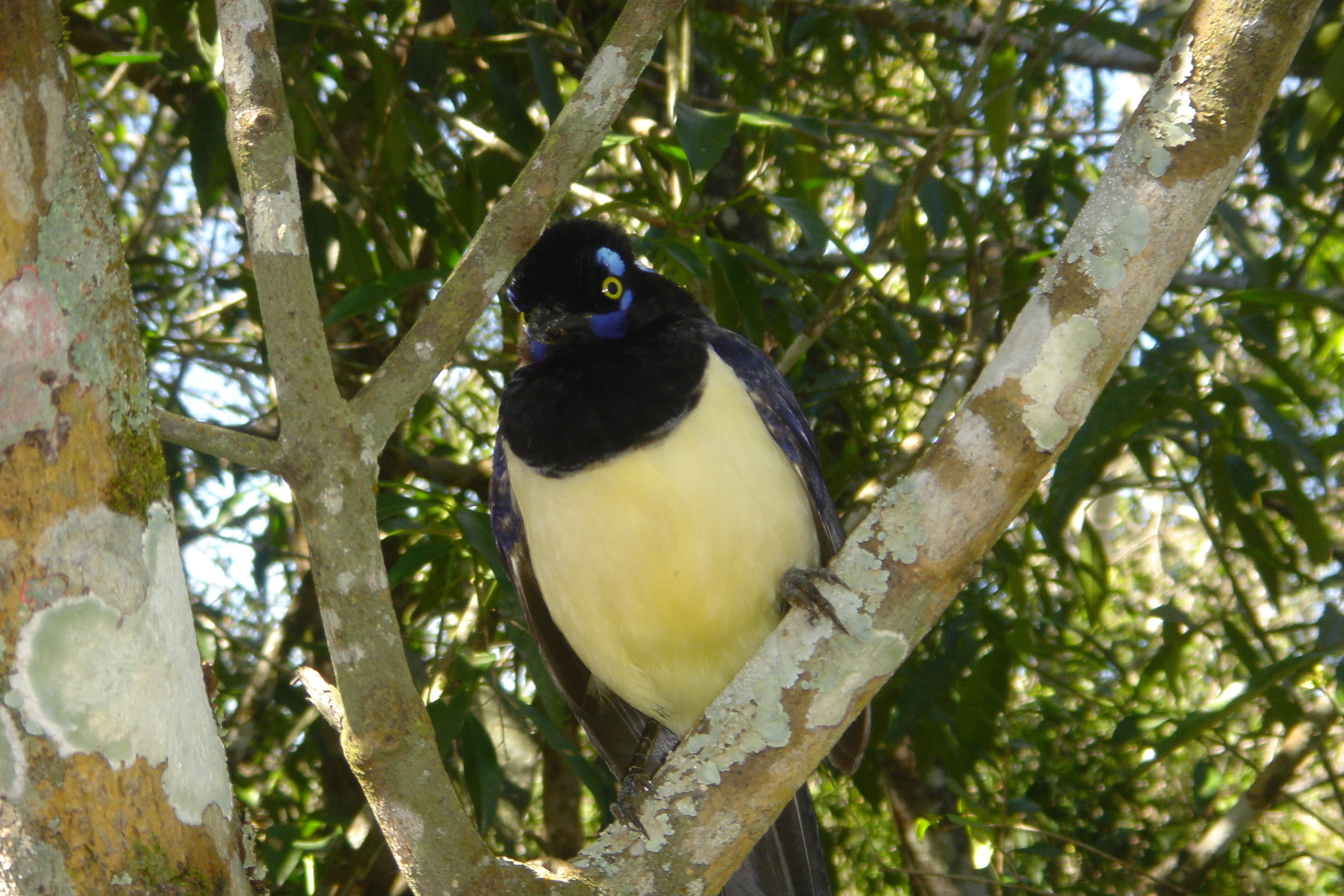
Plush-crested jay (Cyanocorax chrysops)

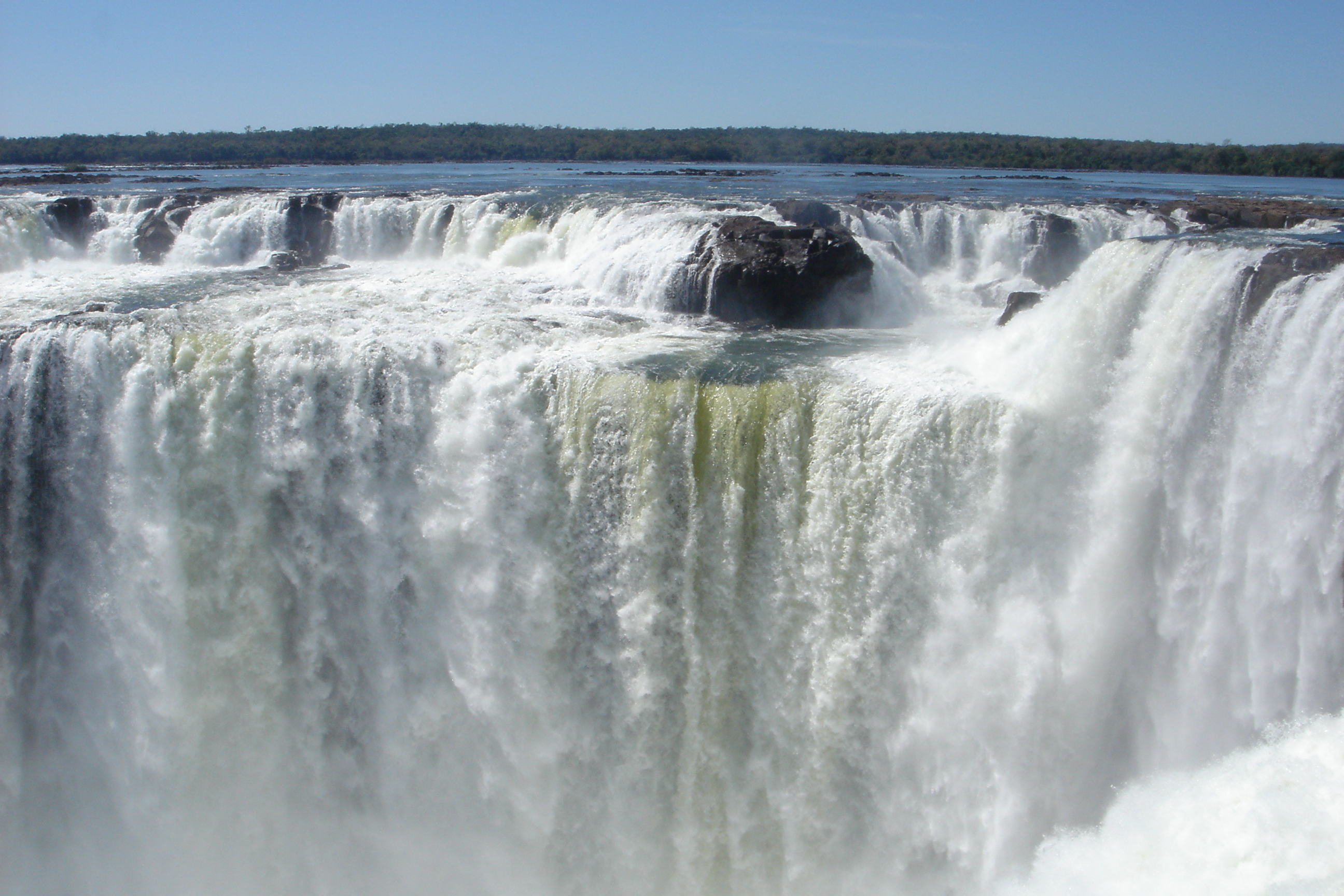
View of waterfall

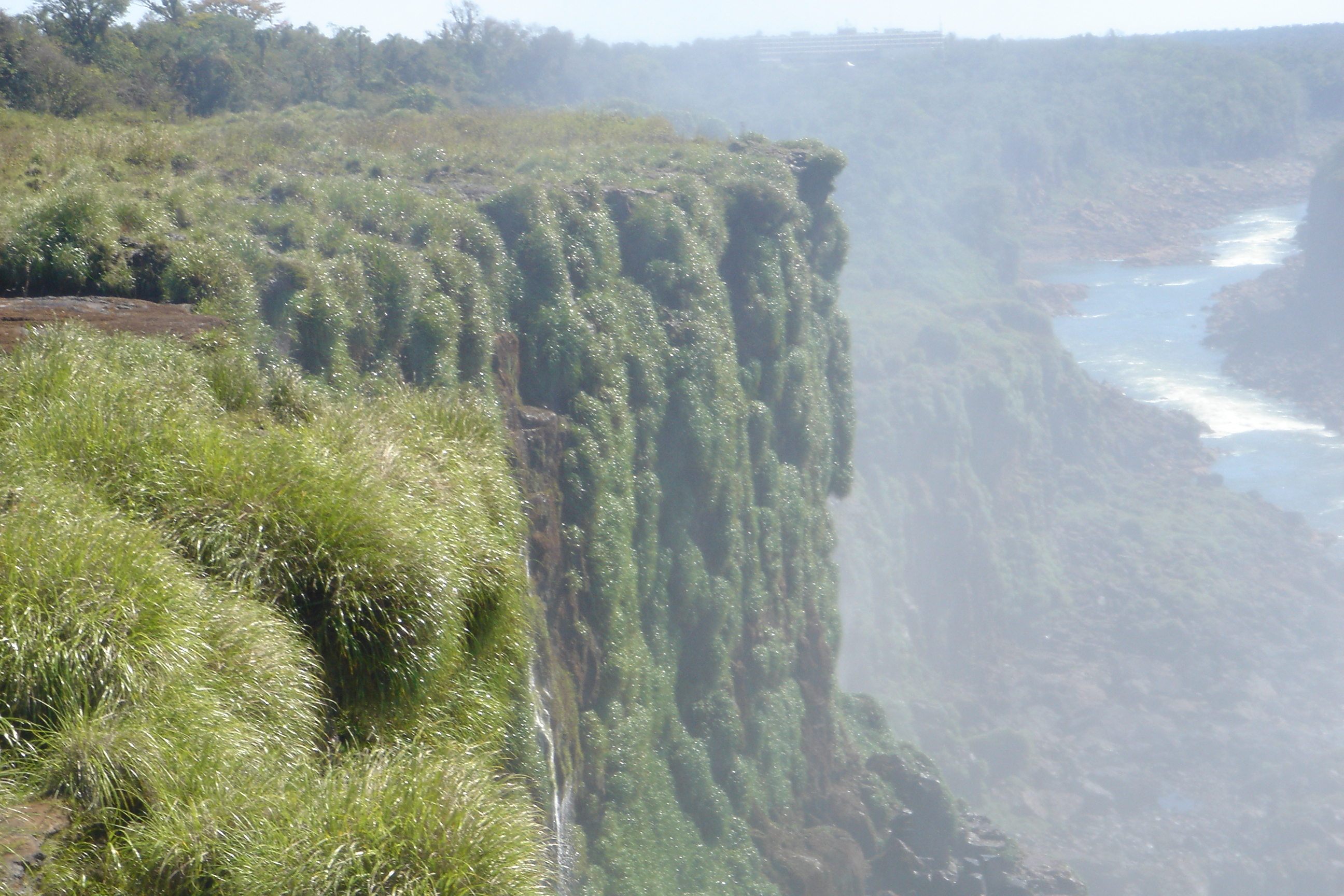
View of waterfall

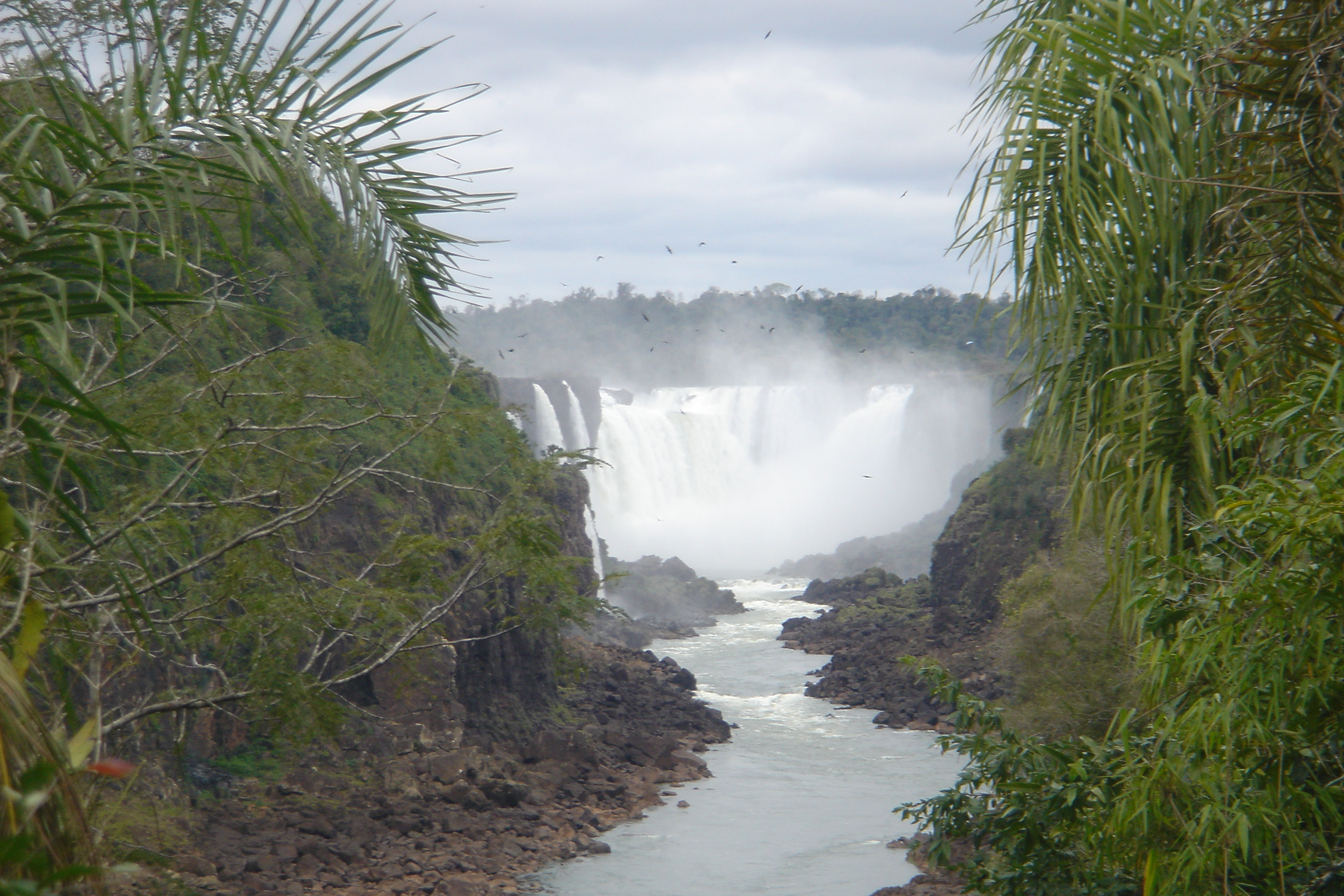
View of waterfall

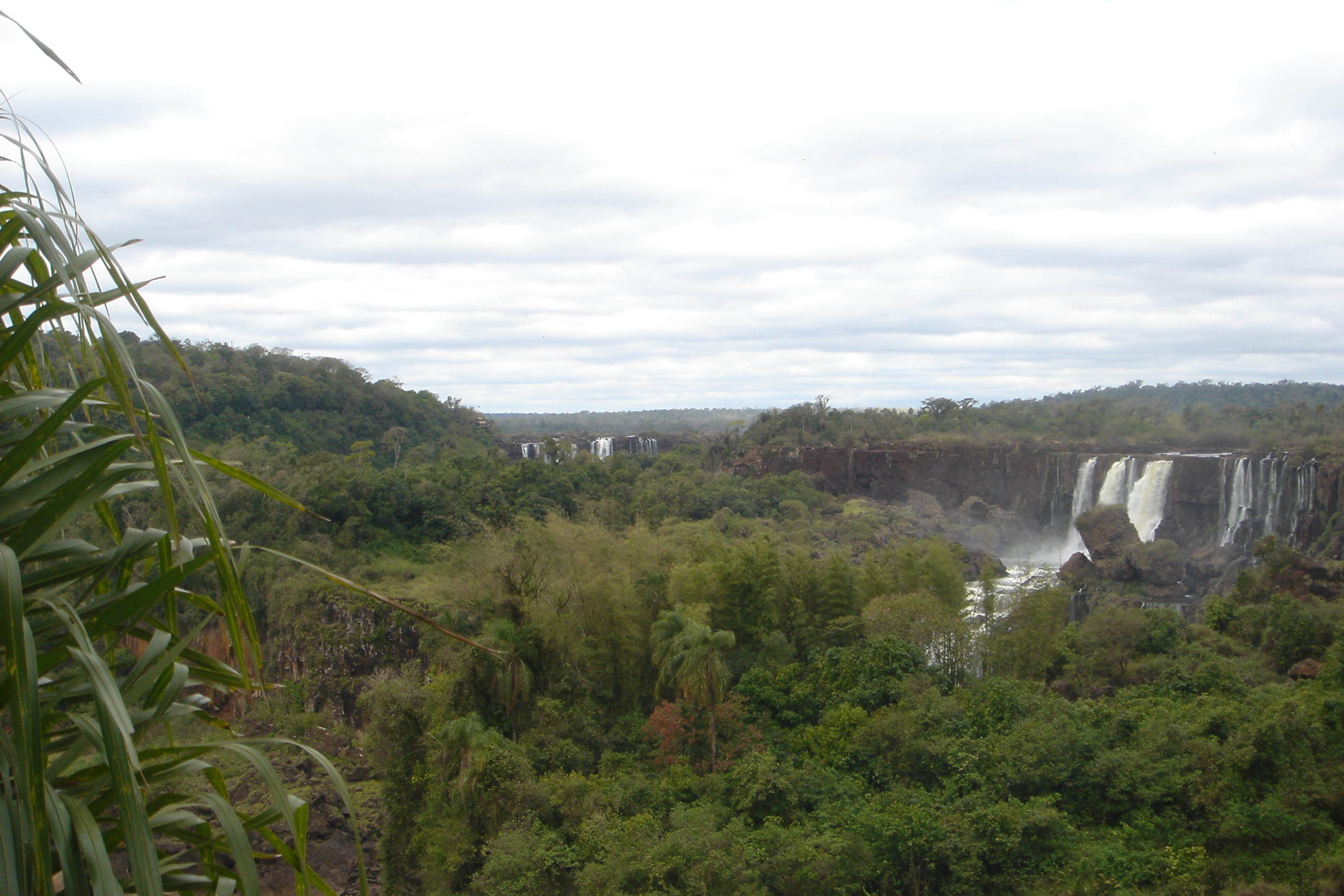
Distant view of waterfall

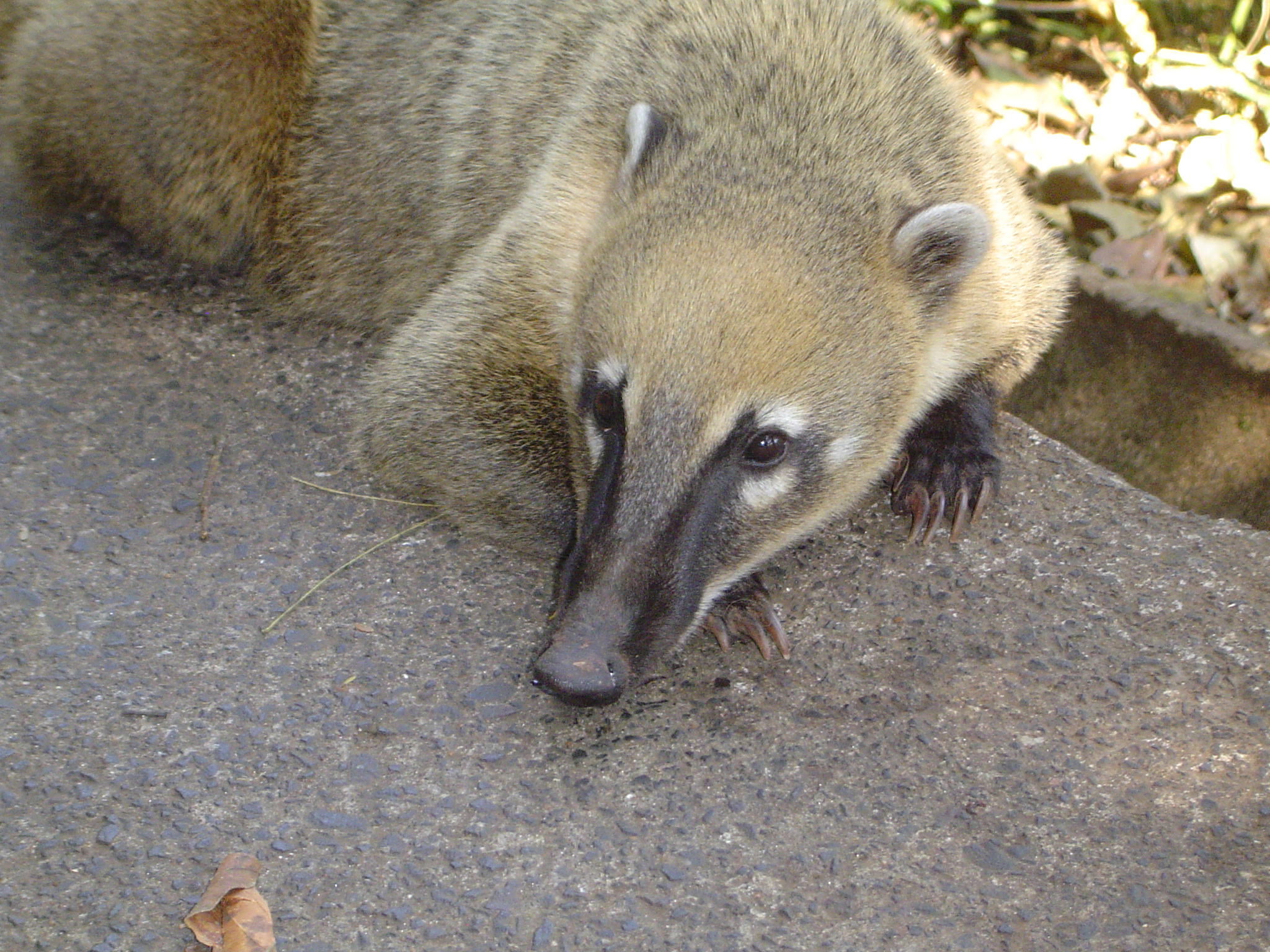

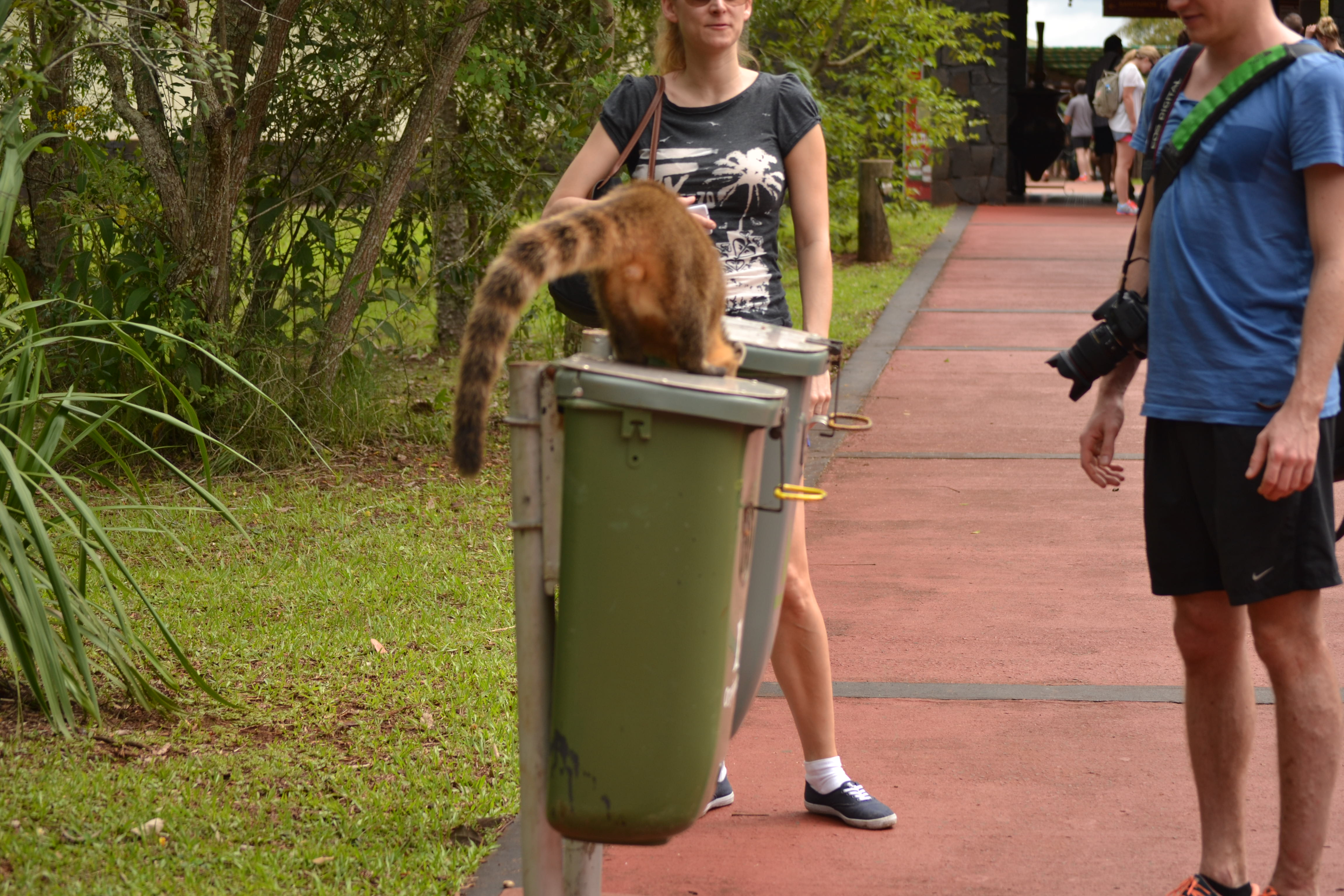

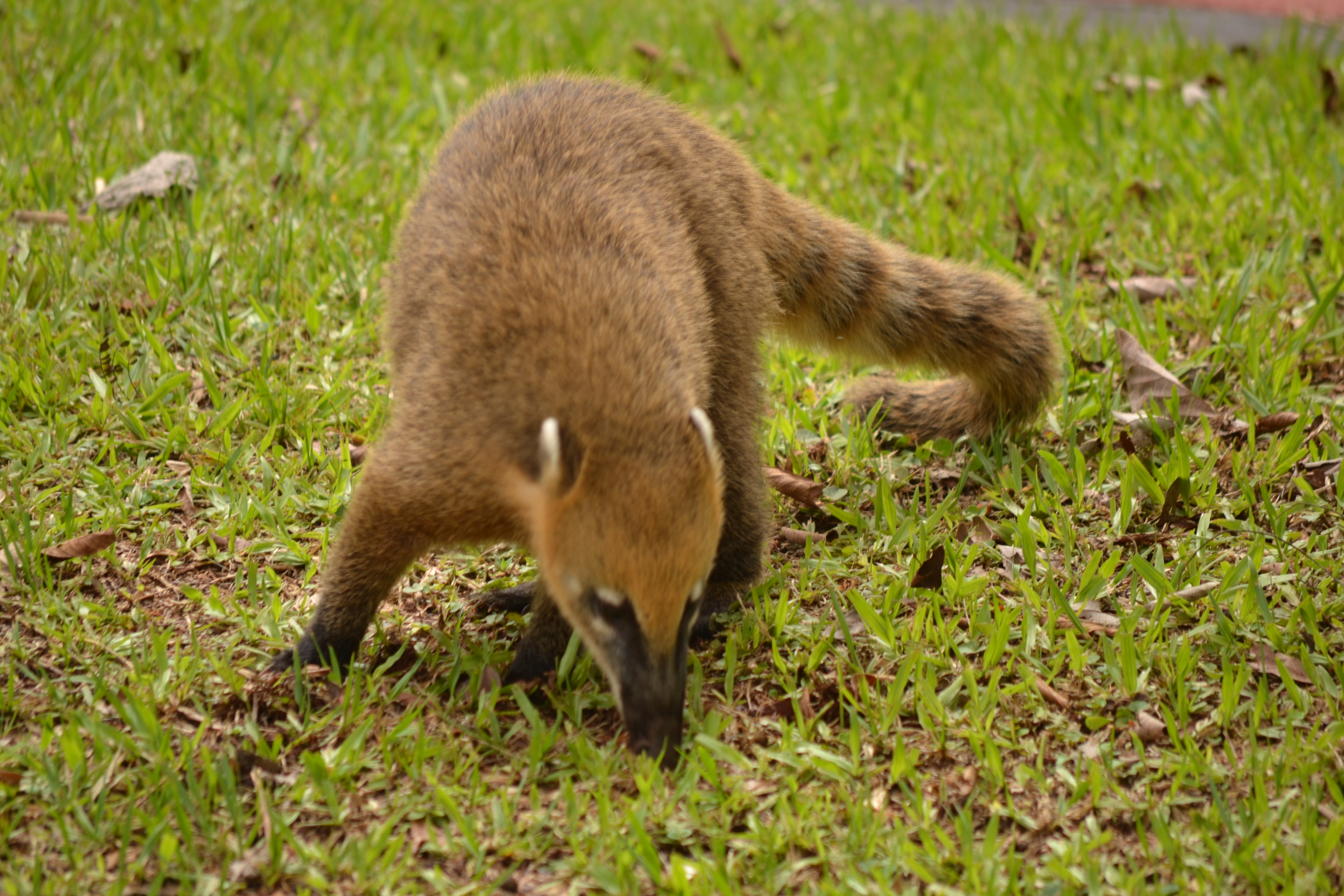

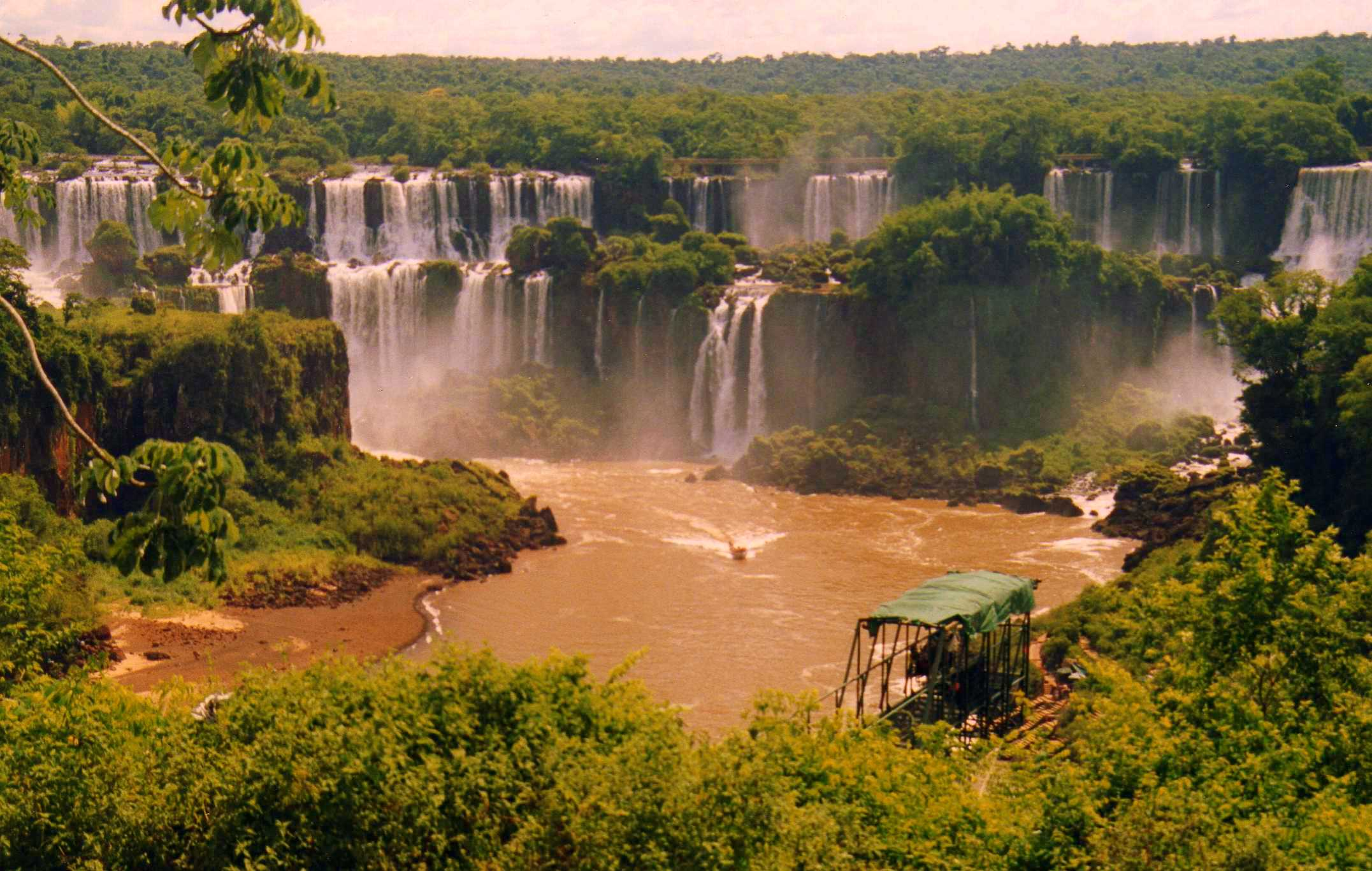

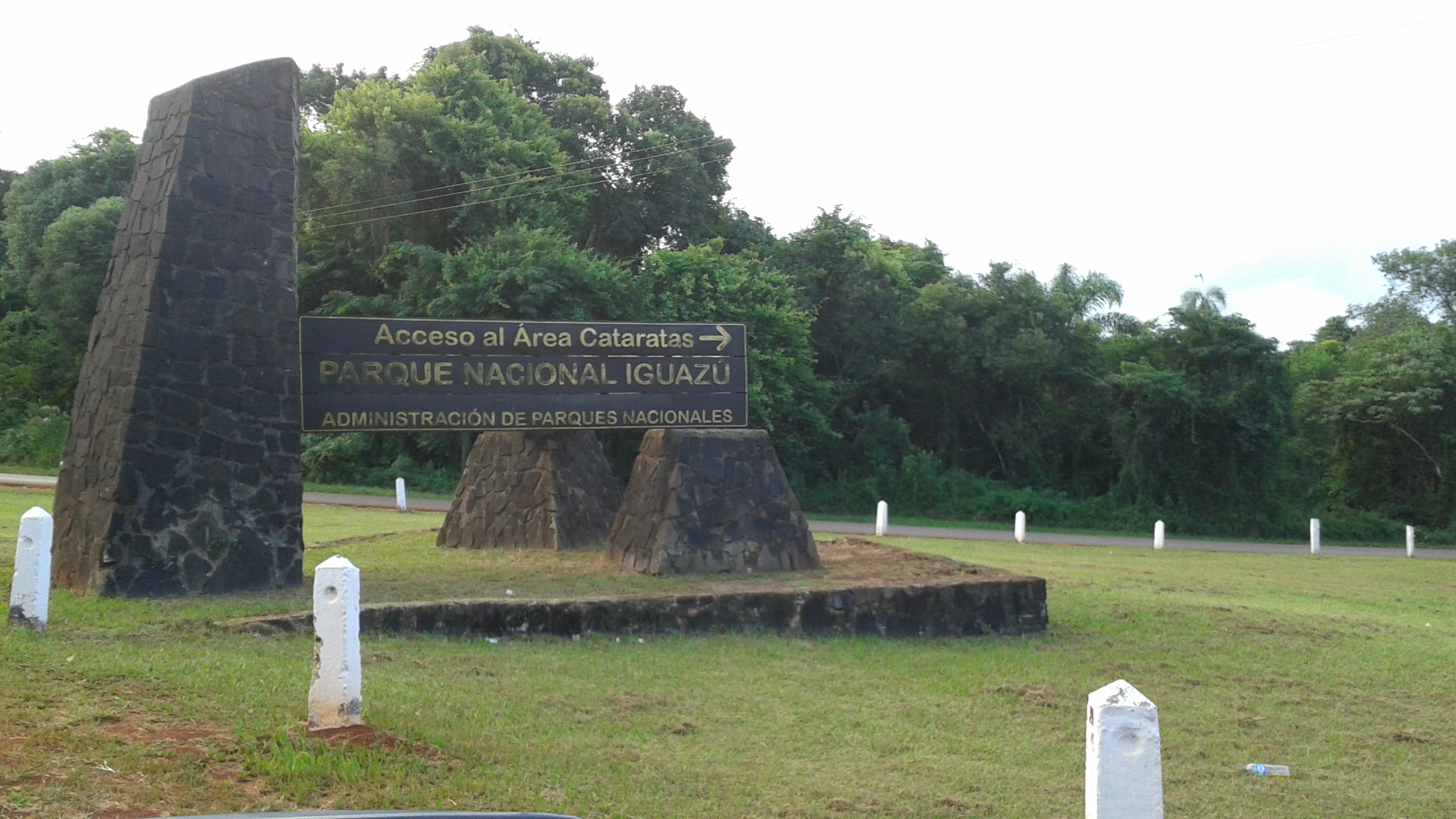

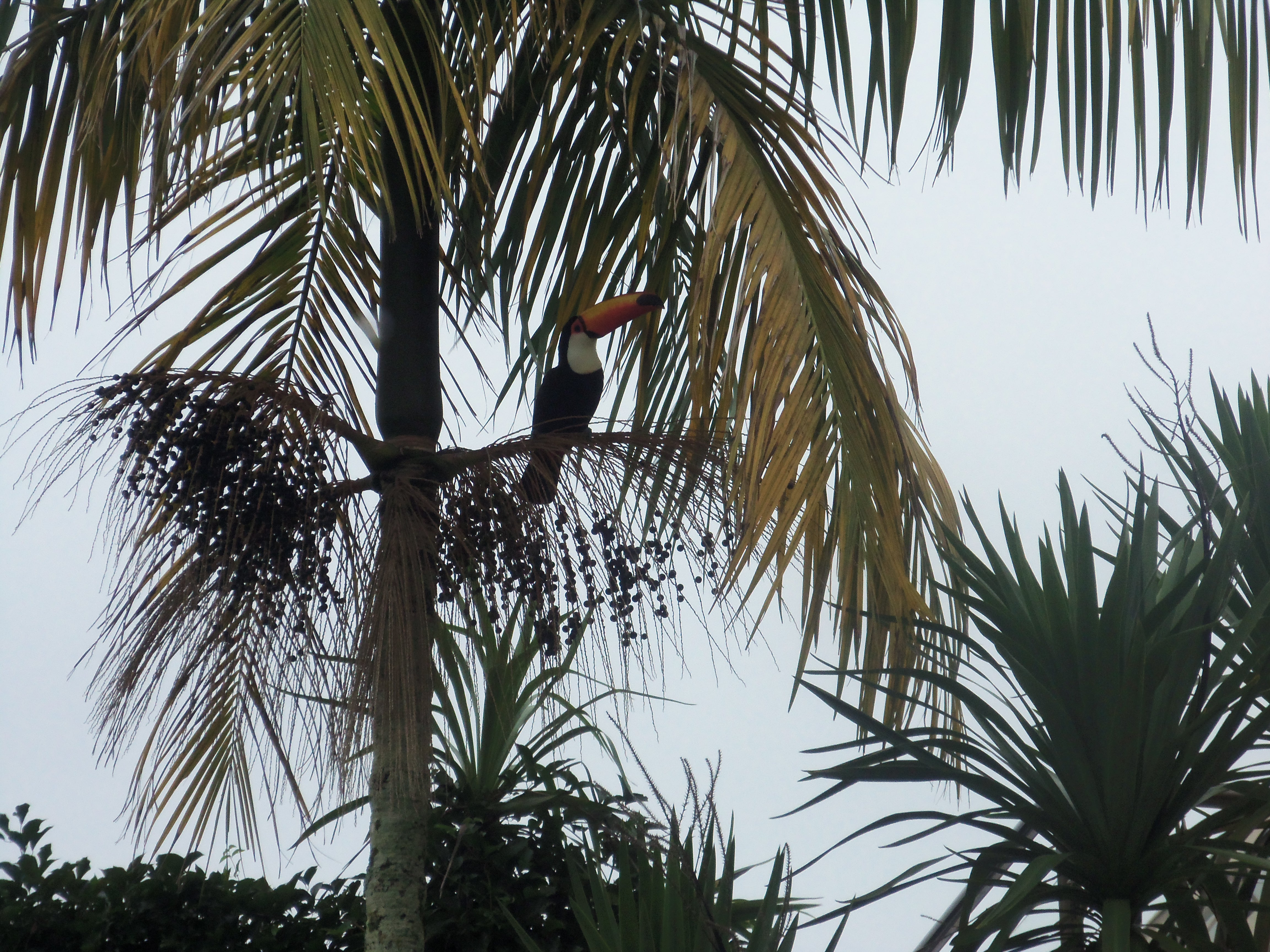

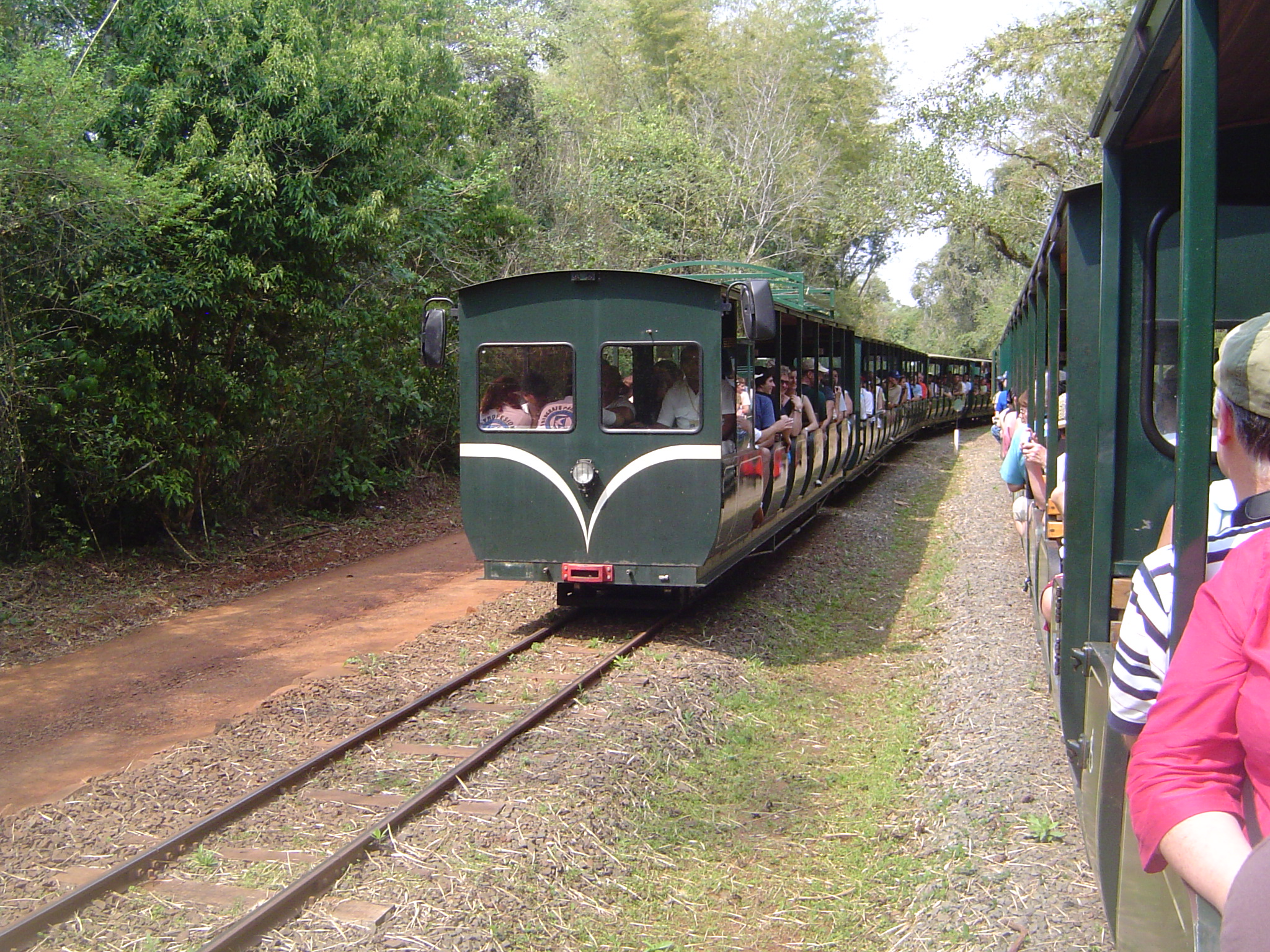
Ecological Train

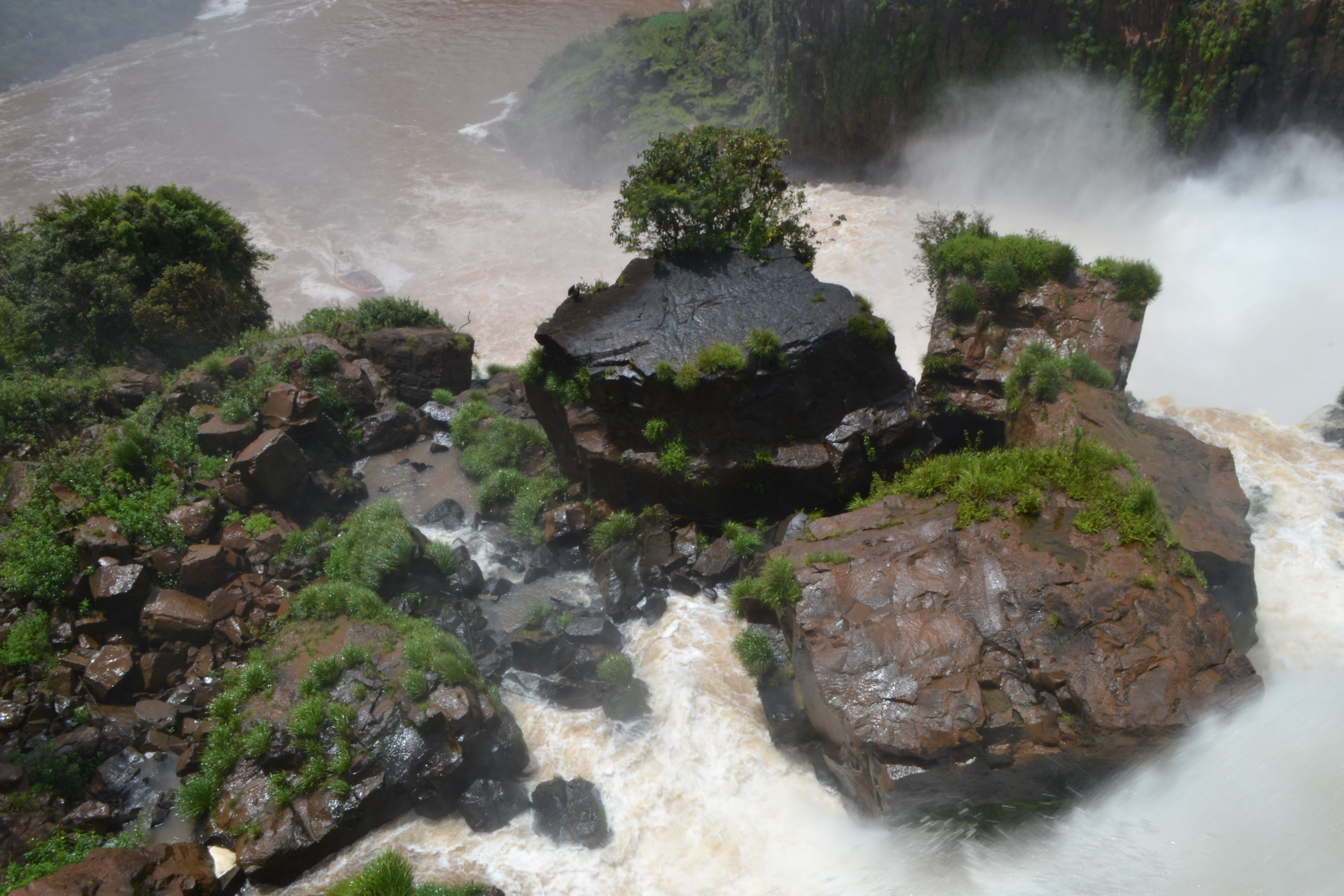

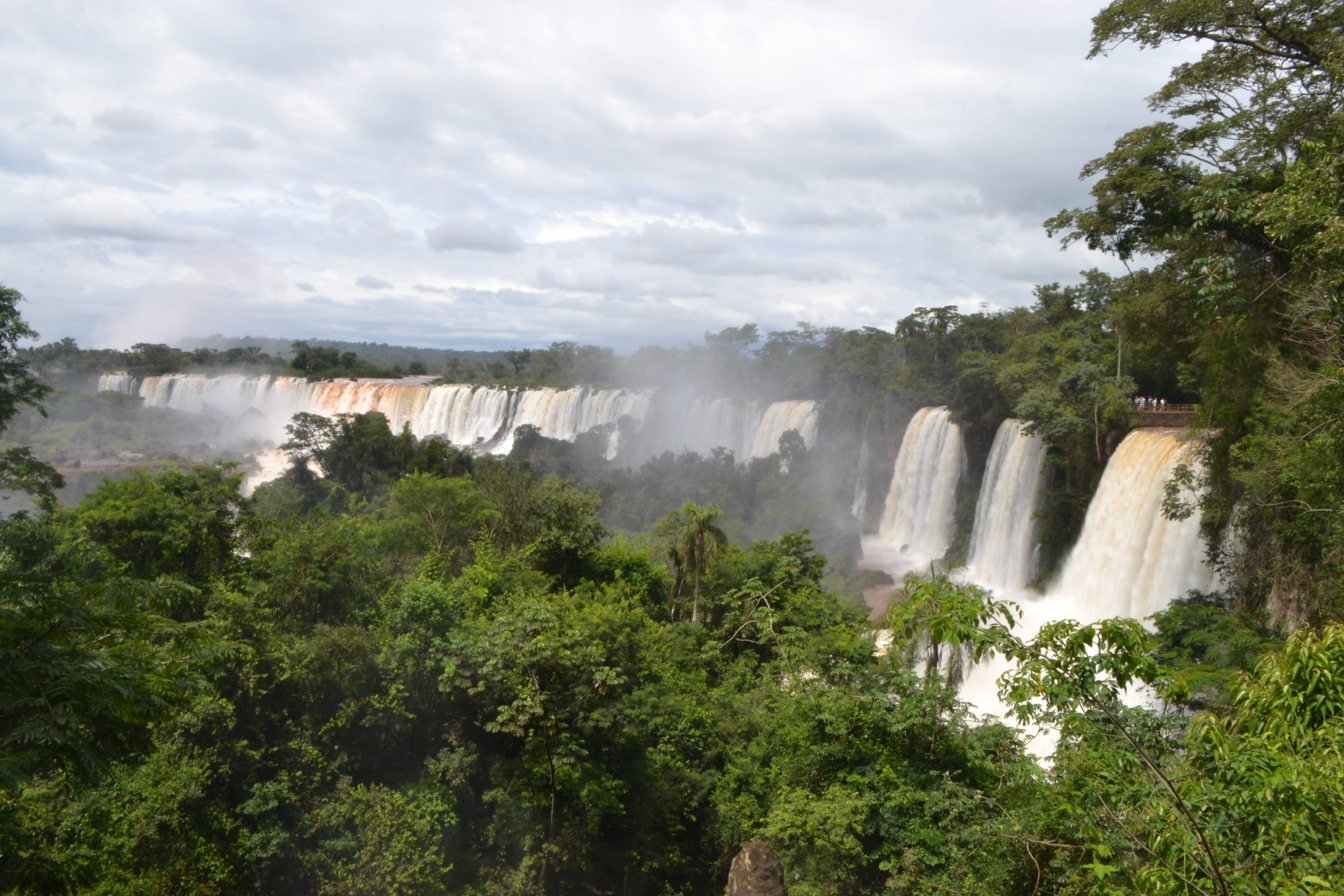

== See also ==
- Rainforest Ecological Train
- Iguaçu National Park (Brazilian side of the park)
- Iguazu Falls

== Sources ==
- Araújo Corte, Dione Angélica de; Valladares-Pádua, Cláudio Benedito (November 2007), Plano de Manejo da Estação Ecológica Mico-Leão-Preto (PDF) (in Portuguese), Brasília: ICMBio, archived from the original (PDF) on 2016-11-07
- "Cataratas del Iguazú y el Río Iguazú", ArgentinaXplora (in Spanish)
- Dinerstein, Olson, D. M, E.; et al. (2001), "Terrestrial Ecoregions of the World: A New Map of Life on Earth", BioScience, 51 (11), doi:10.1641/0006-3568(2001)051[0933:TEOTWA]2.0.CO;2, archived from the original on 2011-10-14
- "Iguazú: Antecedentes Normativos - Límites", Patrimonionatural.com (in Spanish)
- Levingston, Moyano LLerena (7 October 1970), Declaracion y Deslinde de la Reserva Nacional Iguazu del Parque Nacional Iguazu (in Spanish)
- Parque Provincial "Urugua-í" (in Spanish), Ministerio de Ecología y RNR de la Provincia de Misiones, archived from the original on 2016-08-21
