= Route 7 (Paraguay) =

Road in Paraguay

National Route 07
- Ruta nacional PY07
- José Gaspar Rodríguez de Francia
- PY07 highlighted in red

Route information
- Length: 193 km (120 mi)

Major junctions
- West end: Coronel Oviedo
- Route 2 in Coronel Oviedo, CG Route 8 in Coronel Oviedo, CG Route 6 in Minga Guazú, AP
- East end: Ciudad del Este

Location
- Country: Paraguay

Highway system
- Highways in Paraguay

National Route 7 (in Spanish, officially Ruta Nacional Número 7 "José Gaspar Rodríguez de Francia", or simply Ruta Siete) is an important highway of Paraguay. It links the departmental capitals of Caaguazú and Alto Paraná, Coronel Oviedo and Ciudad del Este, respectively, crossing a total of 10 districts of both departments, traversing 193 km (120 mi).

== Distances and important cities ==
The following table shows the distances traversed by Ruta 7 in each different department, and important cities that it passes by (or near).

Km	City	Department	Junctions
0	Coronel Oviedo	Caaguazú	Route 2 Route 8
47	Caaguazú	Caaguazú	
72	Doctor Juan Manuel Frutos	Caaguazú	
84	Doctor J. Eulogio Estigarribia	Caaguazú	
112	José Domingo Ocampos	Caaguazú	
118	Juan Emilio O'Leary	Alto Paraná	
130	Doctor Juan León Mallorquín	Alto Paraná	
156	Yguazú	Alto Paraná	
180	Minga Guazú	Alto Paraná	Route 6
193	Ciudad del Este	Alto Paraná	

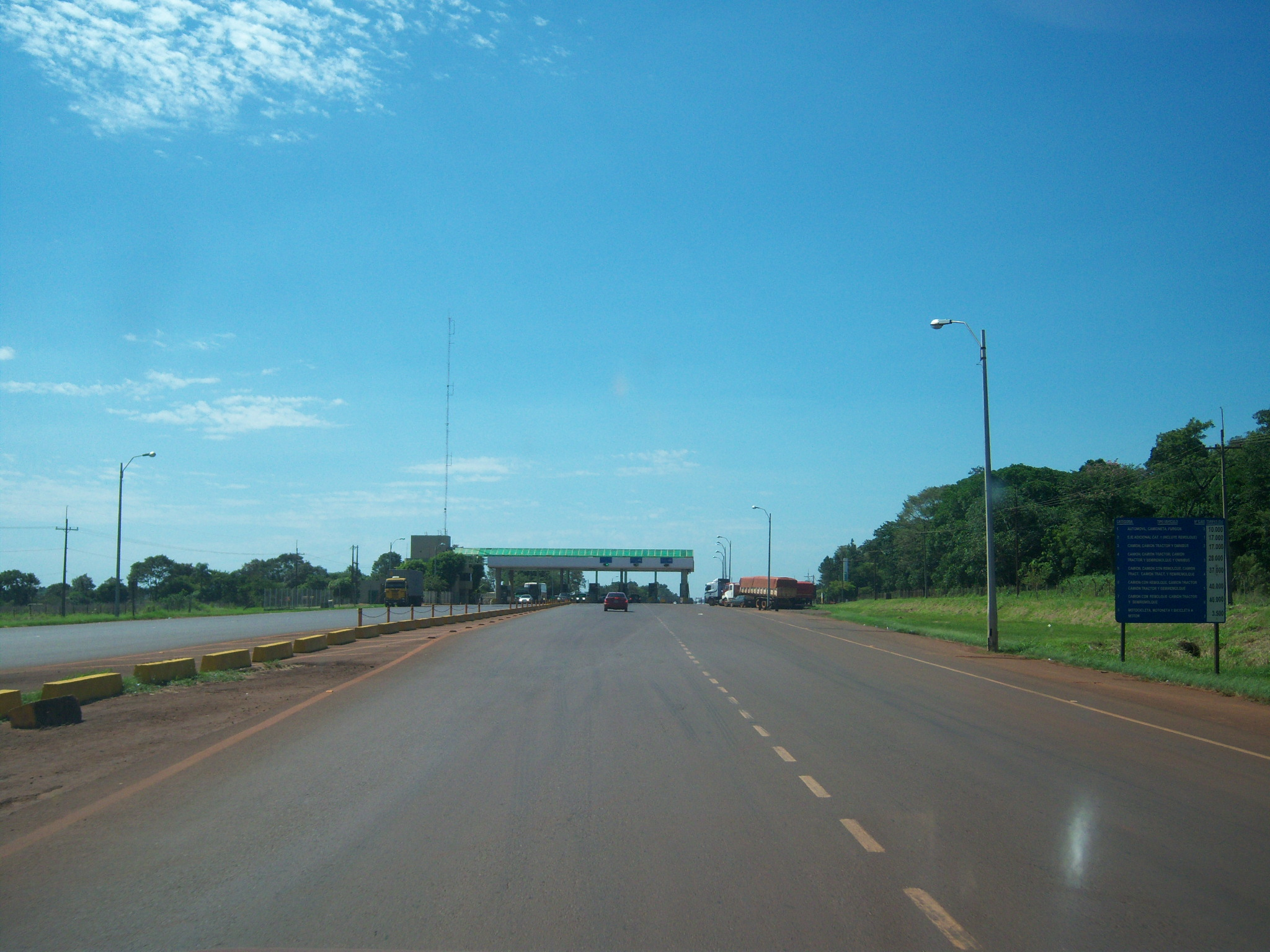
Route 7 near Minga Guazú.
