= Nelson Valdez =

Paraguayan footballer (born 1983)

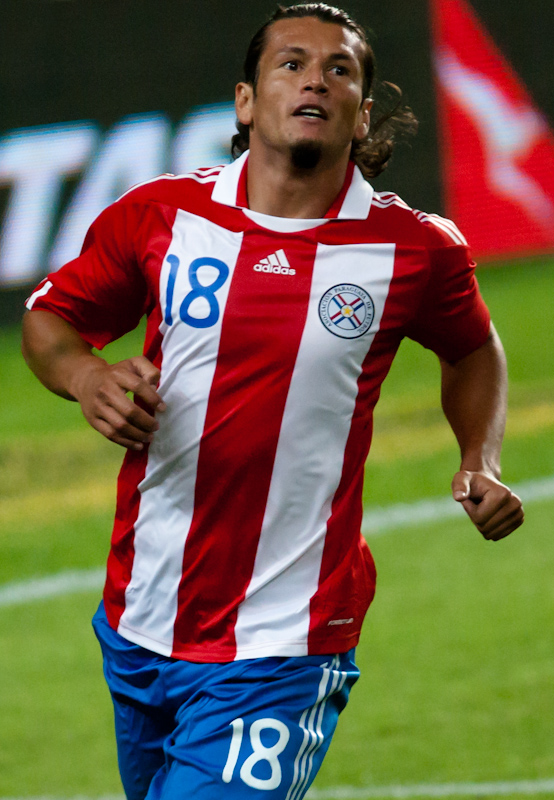
- Valdez playing for Paraguay in 2010

Personal information
- Full name: Nelson Antonio Haedo Valdez
- Date of birth: 28 November 1983 (age 42)
- Place of birth: San Joaquín, Caaguazú, Paraguay
- Height: 1.78 m (5 ft 10 in)
- Position: Striker

Youth career
- Primero de Mayo
- 1998–2000: Tembetary

Senior career*
Years	Team	Apps	(Gls)
2000–2001	Tembetary	22	(11)
2001–2005	Werder Bremen II	51	(24)
2002–2006	Werder Bremen	80	(21)
2006–2010	Borussia Dortmund	113	(15)
2010–2011	Hércules	25	(8)
2011–2013	Rubin Kazan	20	(3)
2012–2013	→ Valencia (loan)	28	(6)
2013–2014	Al Jazira	12	(4)
2014	→ Olympiacos (loan)	10	(6)
2014–2015	Eintracht Frankfurt	10	(1)
2015–2016	Seattle Sounders FC	31	(1)
2017–2020	Cerro Porteño	83	(20)
Total		485	(120)

International career
2003	Paraguay U20	4	(1)
2004–2017	Paraguay	77	(13)

Managerial career
- 2022–2026: Werder Bremen II (assistant)
- 2026: Libertad
Medal record
Representing Paraguay
Copa América
Runner-up	2011 Argentina	Team
- * Club domestic league appearances and goals

Nelson Antonio Haedo Valdez (born 28 November 1983) commonly known as Nelson Valdez or Nelson Haedo in Spanish speaking countries, is a Paraguayan professional football coach and a former player who played as a striker for clubs in Paraguay, Germany, Spain, Russia, the United Arab Emirates, Greece, the US and for the Paraguay national team between 2000 and 2021.

Valdez started his career with Atlético Tembetary, progressing through their youth system to the first-team squad where he made his debut at the age of 16 in Paraguayan División Intermedia in 2000. He finished his career with the club having scored 11 goals in 22 league appearances. In 2001, he was scouted to Germany's Werder Bremen II, where he scored 15 goals in 30 Regionalliga Nord appearances in his second season before joining the club's first-team. In 2003, Valdez was selected for the Paraguay under-20 national team where he scored one goal in four appearances at the 2003 FIFA World Youth Championship. In his second season with Werder Bremen, he claimed the 2003–04 Bundesliga and 2003–04 DFB-Pokal, having scored five goals in 21 league appearances that season. Valdez debuted in the 2004–05 UEFA Champions League on 14 September 2004 and scored his first two Champions League goals in a 2–0 victory against Valencia in December. During his years at Werder Bremen, Valdez had his appearances limited due to competition from teammates Aílton, Angelos Charisteas and both Miroslav Klose and Ivan Klasnić, who were the Bundesliga's top striking duo at the time.

Valdez left Werder Bremen in August 2006 to join fellow Bundesliga side Borussia Dortmund for a fee of €4.7 million on a four-year contract, where he was given the number 9 shirt. Within those four years, he scored 16 goals in 113 Bundesliga appearances and helped Dortmund qualify for the 2010–11 UEFA Europa League. After an impressive performance at the 2010 FIFA World Cup with Paraguay, Valdez joined La Liga side Hércules for €3.5 million on a three-year contract, where he partnered with French striker David Trezeguet. He became the most expensive signing in the club's history and scored a double on his debut in a 2–0 win at the Camp Nou against Barcelona on 11 September. After eight goals in 25 league appearances in the 2010–11 La Liga season, Hércules were relegated to the Segunda División and Valdez was then transferred to Russian Premier League side Rubin Kazan for €4 million. Valdez was later loaned out to Valencia and went on to enjoy stints with Al Jazira and Olympiacos. In July 2014, Valdez returned to the Bundesliga and signed with Eintracht Frankfurt, being reunited with former Werder Bremen coach Thomas Schaaf. Valdez played from 2015 to 2016 with American club Seattle Sounders FC in Major League Soccer, scoring in the playoffs and winning the MLS Cup in his final season.

Valdez has represented Paraguay at the 2006 and 2010 FIFA World Cup tournaments, he also participated at the 2004, 2011 and 2015 Copa América tournaments; in 2011 Paraguay finished runners-up. Valdez has made over 70 national team appearances and scored 13 goals, with one of his goals coming in a 1–0 historic victory against rivals Argentina on 9 September 2009 which secured Paraguay's qualification to the 2010 World Cup and the result being Paraguay's second official victory against Argentina.

== Early life ==
Growing up, Valdez dreamed of playing for the Albirroja. Valdez and his family lived in poverty in the deprived district of San Joaquín, one of the poorest parts of Paraguay. Valdez confessed that he had an "excellent childhood" and had the joy of being from a loving family. Not owning a football, his skills were developed by playing with an orange or a pair of socks as his family, which included six siblings, could not afford to buy a ball for him. He first began to play club football when he joined local club 1º de Mayo of the San Joaquín district. Before leaving home, Valdez was to convince his mother to let him play football. His father took his side and Valdez eventually managed to go to Asunción to pursue his dream. Valdez stated that before he left to Asunción to join Atlético Tembetary, he endured depression after the death of his 13 year old cousin who was like a brother, and began consuming cane liquor, a whiskey which was 50 cents per liter, and confessing that he was once almost an alcoholic. "I played football during the day and in the evening was drunk". Later, Valdez' father Antonio spoke with him and looked him in the eyes and then he understood perfectly what he had to do.

== Club career ==
=== Tembetary ===
Aged 15, Valdez left his home and family to move to Ypané when he joined the Youth Academy of Atlético Tembetary, and eventually made his first-team debut in the Paraguayan División Intermedia in 2000. The second division club were not able to pay him a salary large enough to earn a living and his family were not able to provide funding for him. Valdez confessed the difficulty he faced when leaving his impoverished family and his home to begin playing with the club, for two years he lived under the wooden plank grandstands of the stadium in a stairwell, using a makeshift bed of blankets and cardboard which laid in the stairwell beneath the stand. He never told his parents, who were poor land workers. Valdez stated, "For two years I lived under the grandstands, we were 12 or 13 people and some of them only endured two or three weeks." While living 250 kilometres away from his family, Valdez had no home while playing for Tembetary. He worked night shifts in a sawmill to pay for food and drink. He was a 16-year-old exposed to danger and the Paraguayan climate, boiling hot summers and freezing cold winters, which Valdez described as "hell, frightening and horrible. But if you have nothing, what can they steal? I had nothing to give". Jürgen Born, chairman of the board or management of German Bundesliga club Werder Bremen and who worked for Deutsche Bank in Latin America, stated that he saw a "madman who never stopped running", remembering youth games in Ypané. He bought Valdez a ticket to Germany and got on the phone to Werder Bremen. In December 2001, Valdez flew over to Germany for a trial. Valdez failed at first, not impressing in his trial but the club president's wife, who was a fellow Paraguayan, asked for Valdez to be given another trial. He scored four times in his first trial match and was offered a contract to join Werder Bremen II, the club's Regionalliga Nord team.

=== Werder Bremen ===
Upon joining Werder Bremen in December 2001, Valdez did not know a word of German and knew just enough Spanish due to being much more fluent in Guaraní. Valdez stated that his first months were very hard because of the cold weather and that he did not know how to order food properly. For the first few months, he did not eat anything except chicken and chips because he would see it through the glass at a restaurant.

Valdez played in Werder Bremen's youth teams before quickly winning space in the first-team. In his first season in the Regionalliga Nord, he scored three goals in 12 appearances. In the 2002–03 Regionalliga Nord, he scored 15 goals in 30 league appearances. His performances earned him a call-up to the first-team from manager Thomas Schaaf, where Valdez debuted in the 2002–03 Bundesliga in a 1–0 home loss to Energie Cottbus 22 February 2003, where he was substituted onto the field in the 82nd minute for Christian Schulz. One week later, Valdez gained in second appearance in a 3–0 away loss against Bayer Leverkusen on 1 March, where Valdez was substituted onto the field for Angelos Charisteas in the 72nd minute. His performances also earned him a call-up to the Paraguay under-20 national team for the 2003 FIFA World Youth Championship. Valdez made his first appearance of the 2003–04 Bundesliga season in round 4 in a 4–1 home victory against Schalke 04 on 23 August, where he scored after three minutes of coming onto the field. On 29 October, Valdez eventually signed a four-year professional contract with Werder Bremen's first-team.

On 8 November, Valdez made his full debut for Bremen in a 5–1 away win against Hannover 96; he scored a double for Bremen before being substituted off of the field for Markus Daun in the 81st minute. On 31 January, Valdez scored his fourth league goal against Hertha BSC in a 4–0 home victory after entering the field in the 72nd minute. In round 31, Valdez scored his fifth and final league goal for the 2003–04 season in the 80th minute in a 6–0 home victory against Hamburger SV, after being substituted onto the field in the 62nd minute. In the 2003–04 DFB-Pokal final on 29 May, Valdez was substituted onto the field for Ivan Klasnić in the 87th minute of the 3–2 win against Alemannia Aachen, as Bremen were crowned champions. Bremen finished top of the 2003–04 Bundesliga table with 74 points and qualified for the 2004–05 UEFA Champions League. Valdez had scored five goals in 21 league appearances, although his appearances were limited due to competition between teammates Aílton, Angelos Charisteas and Ivan Klasnić.

On the first day of the 2004–05 Bundesliga season, a 1–0 home win against Schalke 04 on 6 August, Valdez was substituted onto the field for Miroslav Klose in the 74th minute and scored the match winning goal in the 83rd minute. On 11 September, Valdez scored his second league goal in a 3–1 away loss to Borussia Mönchengladbach. He had again been substituted onto the field for Klose, who was favoured more often instead of Valdez. On 14 September, Valdez debuted in the 2004–05 UEFA Champions League in a 2–0 away loss against Inter Milan. On 27 October, in an away match against VfB Stuttgart, the scores were tied at 1–1 until Valdez scored in the 81st minute to give Bremen a 2–1 victory. Valdez had entered the field in the 61st minute for Christian Schulz.

On 7 December, in a Champions League away match against Valencia, Valdez scored two goals within minutes of coming on as a substitute to win the game at 2–0 for Bremen in an ill-tempered match and enabled his side to progress beyond the group stages of the Champions League at Valencia's expense. On 6 February, Valdez scored an 87th-minute goal to give Bremen a 3–2 away victory against VfL Wolfsburg. He had entered the field in the 75th minute for Ivan Klasnić. During the 2004–05 Champions League knockout stage, Bremen faced Lyon in the round of 16. Valdez played in both fixtures, as Bremen lost 3–0 at home on 23 February and lost 7–2 away on March. On the last day of the 2004–05 season, Valdez scored in a 2–1 away victory against 1. FC Kaiserslautern. Werder Bremen finished third on the 2004–05 Bundesliga table and qualified for the 2005–06 UEFA Champions League Third qualifying round. Valdez had scored seven goals in 25 league appearances, where his appearances were restricted due to Miroslav Klose and Ivan Klasnić being the Bundesliga's top striking duo at the time.

Valdez made his first appearance in the 2005–06 Bundesliga in a 2–0 away win against Mainz 05 in round 2 on 14 August, where he entered the field in the 68th minute. Valdez made his full debut for the 2005–06 season in a 2–1 away victory against Hertha BSC on 1 October, where the game was tied at 1–1 until the 89th minute when Valdez scored to give Bremen a 2–1 victory. On 26 November, Valdez scored in a 2–1 away loss against Schalke 04. He played a full 90-minutes of match and was the main striker as Bremen had played with a 4–2–2–1–1 formation. One week later, he scored in a 2–0 home victory against MSV Duisburg on 3 December.

On 7 December in a 2005–06 Champions League group stage fixture, Valdez scored a double in a 5–1 home win against Panathinaikos. Bremen advanced to the knockout stage where they would faced Juventus in the round of 16. Werder Bremen won the first-leg 3–2 on 22 February and lost the second-leg 2–1 on 7 March. Both Bremen and Juventus were tied 4–4 on aggregate, however Juventus progressed to the quarter-finals due to the away goals rule. On 25 March, Valdez scored a hat-trick in a 5–0 home win against Hannover 96. On 15 April, Valdez scored his ninth league goal of the 2005–06 season in a 1–1 away draw against VfL Wolfsburg. Bremen finished second on the 2004–05 Bundesliga table with 70 points, and qualified for the 2006–07 Champions League. Valdez had scored nine goals in 30 league appearances. After Paraguay's early exit from the 2006 FIFA World Cup, Valdez signed with Borussia Dortmund for a fee of €4.7 million in July.

=== Borussia Dortmund ===
Valdez was given the number 9 shirt after joining Borussia Dortmund on a four-year contract. He became a regular starter for Dortmund's first-team, though he struggled to score. However, Valdez's lack of prolificacy was always compensated for by energy and creativity. His debut for Borussia Dortmund in the 2006–07 Bundesliga season came in a 2–0 away loss to Bayern Munich. In a 3–1 away loss to Schalke 04 on 10 December, Valdez was substituted off of the field after 23 minutes. It was later reported that he had picked up a knee injury during the 3–1 defeat, and would be sidelined for approximately one month. Valdez returned to action in a 3–2 home win against Bayern Munich on 26 January, when he was substituted onto the field for Ebi Smolarek in the 46th minute. He scored his first goal for Dortmund in a 2–0 away victory against VfL Wolfsburg on 5 May, Valdez scored in the 90th minute after entering the field for Alexander Frei. Valdez made 29 league appearances, scoring just one goal, as Borussia Dortmund finished in ninth position of the 2006–07 Bundesliga table with 44 points. Valdez made his first appearance in the 2007–08 Bundesliga season in a 3–1 home defeat to MSV Duisburg on 12 August. One week later, he scored his first goal of the 2007–08 season in a 4–1 away defeat against Schalke 04 on 18 August. Valdez's second league goal came after 11 minutes in a 2–1 away win against VfB Stuttgart on 1 December. One week later, on 7 December, Valdez scored a penalty kick in a 6–1 home victory against Arminia Bielefeld. On 19 April, Borussia Dortmund were defeated 2–1 by Bayern Munich in the 2007–08 DFB-Pokal final. Valdez was substituted onto the field in the 86th minute for Sebastian Kehl. Valdez finished the 2007–08 season with three goals in 27 league appearances. Borussia Dortmund finished in 13th position of the 2007–08 Bundesliga table with 40 points, but qualified for the 2008–09 UEFA Cup First round as DFB-Pokal 2007–08 winners Bayern Munich had already qualified for the 2008–09 UEFA Champions League via their league placement, losing finalists Borussia Dortmund took the UEFA Cup spot reserved for the cup winners.

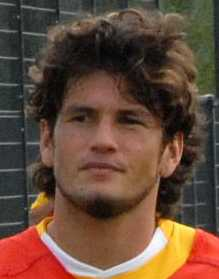
Valdez with Dortmund in 2007

In round 1 of the 2008–09 DFB-Pokal on 9 August, Valdez scored Dortmund's third goal in their 3–1 away win against Rot-Weiss Essen. His first appearance in the 2008–09 Bundesliga season came on 16 August in a 3–2 victory against Bayer Leverkusen, where Valdez scored after just four minutes. During the first-leg of Dortmund's 2008–09 UEFA Cup first round fixture on 18 September, Dortmund were defeated 2–0 at home against Udinese. During the second leg of the 2008–09 UEFA Cup first round on 2 October, Dortmund defeated Udinese 2–0 in Udine. As the result meant that both teams were tied 2–2 on aggregate, the match was decided by a penalty shoot-out. Valdez scored Dortmund's fifth spot-kick, however Udinese won 4–3. Three days later, Valdez scored after ten minutes of the game in a 1–1 home draw against Hannover 96 on 5 October. On 16 May, Valdez scored Dortmund's third goal of their 6–0 home thrashing of Arminia Bielefeld. Valdez scored seven goals in 29 league appearances as Dortmund finished in sixth place of the 2008–09 Bundesliga table with 59 points.

Prior to the start of the 2009–10 Bundesliga, Dortmund signed Paraguayan striker Lucas Barrios, which provided plenty of competition for Valdez and fellow Dortmund striker Mohamed Zidan. Valdez made his first appearance in the 2009–10 season in a 1–0 home victory against 1. FC Köln on 8 August. One week later, on 15 August, he scored his first goal of the 2009–10 season after four minutes in a 4–1 away defeat against Hamburger SV. One week later, he scored in Dortmund's 1–1 home draw against VfB Stuttgart on 22 August. On 23 January, Valdez scored for Dortmund in the 36th minute to give his side a 1–0 home victory against Hamburger SV. One month later, he again scored in Dortmund's 4–1 home win against Hannover 96 on 20 February. Valdez had entered the field for Lucas Barrios in the 63rd minute before scoring Dortmund's third goal in the 77th minute. Valdez's last goal for Dortmund came in a 1–1 draw against 1899 Hoffenheim on 18 April. Valdez had been substituted onto the field for Mohamed Zidan in the 29th minute and scored in the 57th minute to give Dortmund the lead. Valdez scored five goals in 28 league appearances as Dortmund had finished in fifth position of the 2009–10 Bundesliga table with 57 points. Dortmund qualified for the 2010–11 UEFA Europa League play-off round.

On 10 May, it was reported in Germany that Fulham manager Roy Hodgson had considered a £3 million move for Valdez. Valdez stated that he would "love" to play in the Premier League or Spain, and it was thought £3 million would be enough to tempt Dortmund to sell him. In June, Premier League club Sunderland had lined up a bid for Valdez after his impressive performance against Italy at the 2010 World Cup. Borussia Dortmund had indicated that they wanted €10 million (or around £8 million) for Valdez, but Sunderland manager Steve Bruce had been hoping to sign him for less. It was also reported that Wigan Athletic were weighing up a move for Valdez. In July, it was reported that Eredivisie side PSV were also after Valdez due to his performances at the 2010 World Cup. Valdez's contract would run until the summer of 2012, but Borussia Dortmund were keen to cash in on him and had reportedly set a €5 million asking price for Valdez following his good performances at the World Cup.

=== Hércules ===
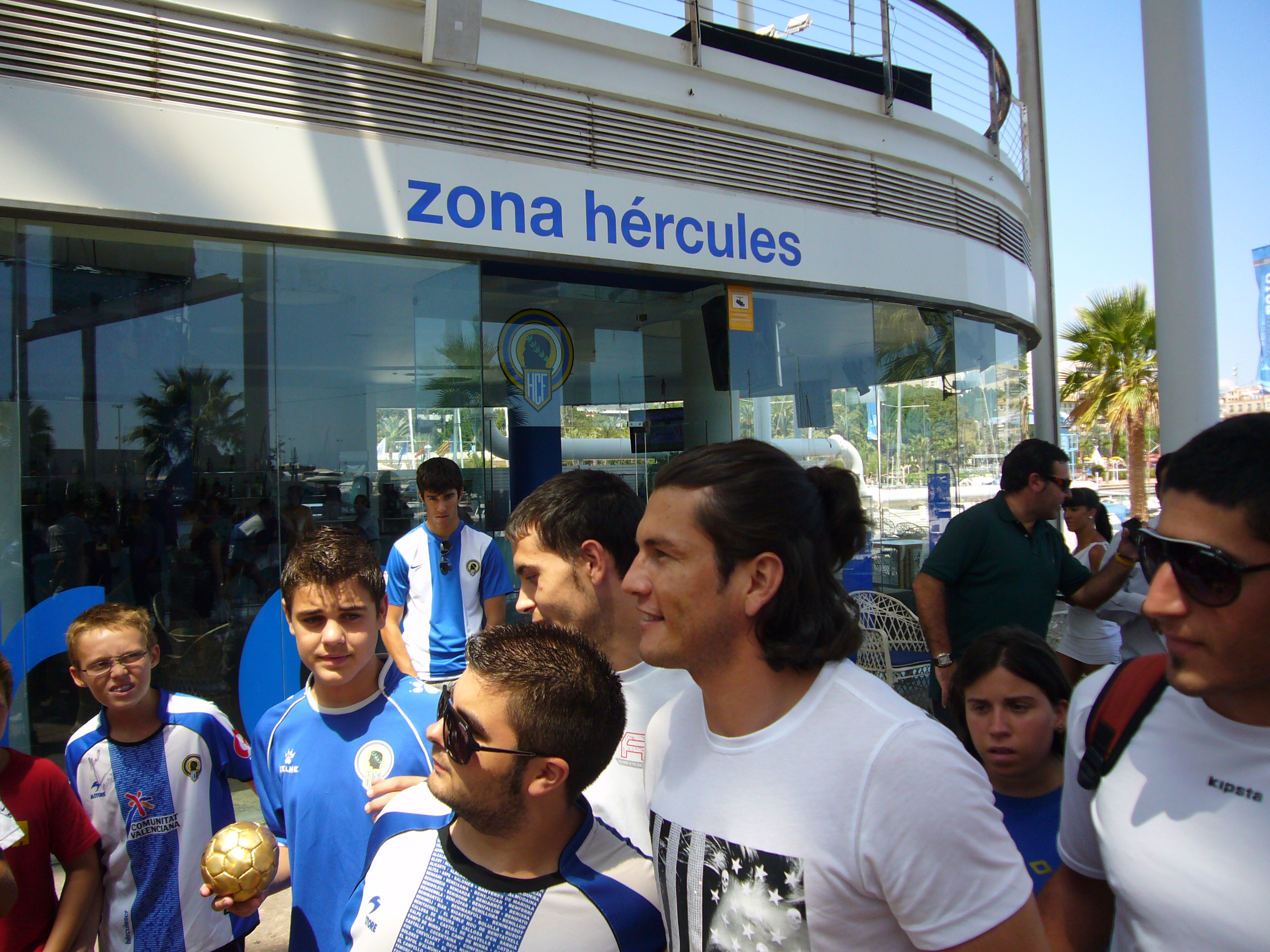
Valdez during his presentation at Hércules CF, 2010

In August 2010, Valdez signed a three-year contract with Hércules after admitting that he had received offers to play in Russia. Valdez became the most expensive signing in the history of Hércules having been transferred for €3.5 million. His debut resulted in a brace against Barcelona on 11 September in a surprising 2–0 victory at the Camp Nou. Valdez scored his second double for Hércules in a 3–1 win against Levante on 29 November. He would then score in a 4–1 against Atlético Madrid on 11 January 2011. In January, when Valdez had scored six times in 11 appearances, it was reported that Real Madrid had considered signing him when Madrid striker Gonzalo Higuaín was ruled out for the season following back surgery, however a transfer was never established. He received a red card on 61 minutes in his second last game of the 2010–11 season in a 3–2 loss against Racing de Santander on 8 May.

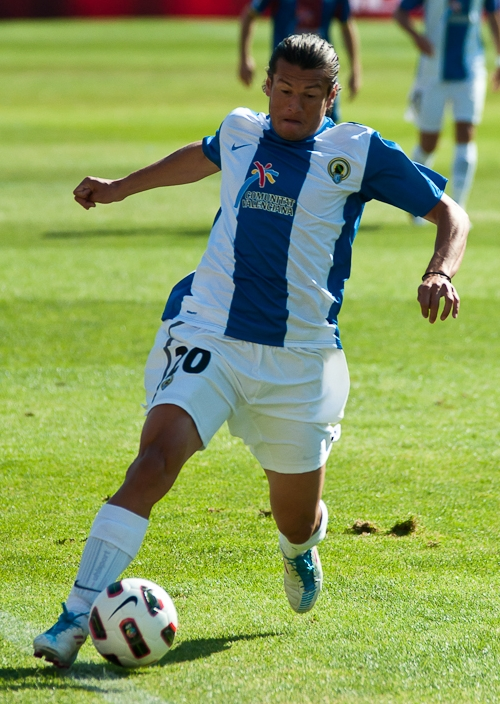
Valdez in action for Hércules CF, 2011

Valdez would finish the season having scored eight goals in 25 league appearances as Hércules would finish 19th in La Liga and face relegation. Having been partnered up front with David Trezeguet, the two had scored 20 goals between them for the 2010–11 season. Valdez took no part in the 2010–11 Copa del Rey which saw Hércules eliminated against Málaga in the round of 32. During his performance at the 2011 Copa América in July, it was reported in Spanish newspapers that a Wigan Athletic party had traveled to Spain to make a €4 million offer for the striker, which was rejected as they were told to put up more money to meet the €5 million release clause in Valdez's contract. Sunderland then proposed an offer of €4.2 million to sign Valdez, who by then had received a lucrative offer from PSV and also offers from Russia, Portugal and England. On 1 August it was reported by ABC de Sevilla that Real Betis had already begun negotiations with Hércules for Valdez as a replacement for Achille Emaná who was reported to being transferred to Saudi Arabia's Al-Hilal, where Hércules had asked for €4 million for the striker, Valdez was also reportedly tempted by Al-Hilal.

=== Rubin Kazan ===
In August 2011, Valdez signed a four-year contract with Russian Premier League side Rubin Kazan. His debut in the 2011–12 season came in a 3–1 away loss to Krasnodar on 10 September, where Valdez received a yellow card on 27 minutes. He made his first appearance in the 2011–12 UEFA Europa League on 15 September in a 3–0 victory over Ireland's Shamrock Rovers. Valdéz scored his first goals in the Europa League, a double, in a 4–1 home win against Shamrock Rovers on 30 November. Two weeks later, he again scored in the Europa League in a 1–1 away draw against PAOK on 15 December. This result meant that Rubin Kazan would progress to the 2011–12 UEFA Europa League knockout phase, where Rubin lost 2–0 on aggregate to Olympiacos.

Valdez scored his first league goal for Rubin in a 1–1 away draw against Zenit Saint Petersburg on 25 March; Valdez was substituted onto the field in the 46th minute and equalised for Rubin in the 58th minute before being substituted off of the field in the 68th minute. Two weeks later, he scored his second league goal in a 1–1 away draw against Dynamo Moscow on 7 April. He made his first appearance in the 2011–12 Russian Cup in Rubin Kazan's 2–0 semi-final win against Rostov on 11 April. In the final game of the season, Valdez opened the scoring for Rubin as they fought back from a goal down to defeat CSKA Moscow 3–1 on 13 May 2012.

On 8 July 2012, it was reported that Argentine Primera División club Newell's Old Boys had announced their intention to sign Valdez with the signing of former Paraguay national team head coach Gerardo Martino in charge of the team for the 2012–13 season. It had also been reported that Valdez had stated that he was interested in transferring to Newell's Old Boys. On 14 July 2012, Valdez was substituted onto the field for Obafemi Martins in the 64th minute of Rubin's 2–0 2012 Russian Super Cup victory against Zenit. The win meant that Valdez had claimed his second title at the club within just under 12-months since his arrival. It was then reported that Spanish La Liga club Espanyol and Primera División Paraguaya club Libertad were interested in signing him.

Valdez debuted in the 2012–13 season in a 2–1 away loss to Krasnodar on 23 July, where he was substituted onto the field for Vladimir Dyadyun in the 46th minute.

==== Loan to Valencia ====
In the summer of 2012, Valdez signed for Valencia on loan. He came on as a substitute against Bayern Munich in the Champions League in which he scored a header where Valencia lost 2–1. Nelson's first league goal for Valencia came on 20 October, heading in a 90th-minute winner to snatch a 3–2 victory over Athletic Bilbao. On 3 November, Valdez scored in injury time to complete Valencia's 2–0 victory over Atlético Madrid, inflicting the capital side's first defeat of the season.

=== Valencia ===
Valencia purchased Valdez's contract outright from Rubin Kazan in February 2013; he subsequently signed a contract with the club lasting till June 2015.

=== Al Jazira ===
On 19 July 2013, Valdez joined Abu Dhabi-based club Al Jazira for a fee believed in the region of €3 million. Wearing the number 9 shirt, Valdez made his first appearance for Al Jazira in a 1–0 away victory against Al-Shaab in a 2013–14 UAE Arabian Gulf Cup tie on 3 September 2013. Valdez made his 2013–14 Arabian Gulf League debut against the same team in a 2–1 away victory on 15 September, playing a full 90-minutes of the fixture. On 25 October, he scored his first league goal for Al Jazira in a 1–1 away draw against Al Dhafra. His goal came in the 38th minute.

In October 2013, Valdez sounded as a possible signing for Barcelona, to which he responded would be a dream that Barcelona is the best club in the world. At the time, Barcelona was coached by his former national team coach, Gerardo Martino.

On 8 January 2014, Valdez scored a double against Al Shaab in his side's 3–0 league victory at home. His goals came in the sixth and tenth minutes of the first half, in a fixture which proved to be Valdez's last appearance for Al Jazira as he was ultimately sanctioned and fined for his celebration. After a fan had whistled at Valdez, in response he scored his first goal and put his finger on his mouth to silence the fans and then scored his second goal and celebrated his goals by touching his crotch as a sign of having "balls". The TV image had censured Valdez's private part and Al Jazira stated that they were prepared to preserve the good behaviour of the sport and had decided to suspend Valdez for his gesture until further notice. Valdez had received the suspension immediately after the match and could not justify his behaviour in an interview. Moments after the match, Valdez wrote in English via his Twitter account that his objective was never to offend anyone instead to make understand that he uses his balls when he is on the field and due to the bad luck in his last games he could not score goals, he expressed it in this manner. Finally, Valdez expressed that during the rumours of his exit from the club that his intention was to stay at the club. Valdez was ultimately loaned to Greek outfit Olympiacos for the remainder of the 2013–14 season.

==== Loan to Olympiacos ====
On 30 January 2014, Valdez joined Super League Greece side Olympiacos on loan from Al Jazira, being issued with the number 18 shirt. He made his debut with the club on 2 February in a 2–1 home victory against Panetolikos, coming onto the field as a substitute for Marko Šćepović in the 60th minute. Two weeks later, he scored his first goal for the club in a 4–2 home victory against Platanias on 15 February. The goal came in the 68th minute and was assisted by Javier Saviola. Valdez's second league goal for Olympiacos came in a 2–0 home victory against Panthrakikos on 15 March; he scored in the 35th minute via an assist by Alejandro Domínguez. Valdez participated in the 2013–14 Champions League round of 16 stage against Manchester United. In the first-leg, he replaced Hernán Pérez in the 86th minute, coming on to the field as a substitute for the bench in Olympiacos' 2–0 home victory on 25 February. In the second-leg on 19 March, Valdez again entered the field for Pérez in the 57th minute was Olympiacos were defeated 3–0 and ultimately 3–2 on aggregate. On 23 March 2014, he scored a hat-trick in a 4–1 away win against Ergotelis. Valdez's hat-trick all came in the space of ten minutes from his first goal, scoring in the 3rd, 9th and 13th minute of the first-half. He netted his last goal of the season in a 1–0 home victory against Aris on 30 March; the goal came in the 84th minute and was assisted by José Holebas. Valdez concluded the Super League Greece season with six league goals in ten appearances. Olympiakos finished in first place of the 2013–14 Super League Greece table and qualified for the 2014–15 Champions League. He made his first appearance in the 2013–14 Greek Cup on 2 April 2014 in a semi-final 2–1 first-leg home victory against PAOK, playing the full 90 minutes of the fixture.

=== Eintracht Frankfurt ===
On 29 July 2014, it was reported that Valdez had signed with Eintracht Frankfurt for the 2014–15 Bundesliga season, returning to the Bundesliga four years after departing the German competition in 2010. Valdez, who was issued with the number 11 shirt for the club, stated that his motivation for joining Frankfurt was because of being offered to join the club by coach Thomas Schaaf, who had coached Valdez during his years at Werder Bremen. Valdez mentioned that he had always maintained contact with Schaaf and believed that he was one of the few people that he felt he owed something to: "He made me a professional. For me, it was clear that I was going to go to Frankfurt when I received the offer. It is an enormous pleasure to return to the Bundesliga."

Valdez first appeared in an Eintracht Frankfurt shirt in an International club friendly fixture against Inter Milan on 10 August; he was in the starting XI and was substituted off of the field in the 60th minute for Václav Kadlec as Frankfurt would win the tie 3–1 at home. Valdez then made his first appearance for Frankfurt in an official competition during a 2–0 away victory against Viktoria Berlin in the first round of the 2014–15 DFB-Pokal on 16 August. Valdez again was in the starting eleven and was substituted in the 70th minute of the match for Alexander Meier, who went on to score Frankfurt's second goal of the match. Valdez made his 2014–15 Bundesliga debut in a 1–0 home victory against SC Freiburg on 23 August, playing until the 84th minute of the match before being substituted off of the field for Johannes Flum.

On 30 August, Valdez appeared in his second league match, a 2–2 away draw against VfL Wolfsburg. He received a hard knock in the second half of the match and was subsequently substituted off of the field in the 56th minute for Timothy Chandler. It was later confirmed that Valdez had torn cruciate ligaments in his right knee and would be side lined for approximately six months. In late December, German newspaper Bild reported that Valdez stated that despite the expectation of being sidelined for an estimated six months, his injury has healed outstandingly, just after three and a half months of the incident, and if the rehab continued well, Valdez would regress by January, much earlier than planned, and with hopes of making it in time for the 2015 Copa América.

Upon Valdez's return from injury, he was substituted onto the field in the 74th minute in a league fixture against SC Paderborn on 14 March 2015 and scored for Frankfurt in the 82nd minute as his side won the fixture 4–0.

=== Seattle Sounders FC ===
==== 2015 season ====
Valdez signed with Seattle Sounders FC of Major League Soccer (MLS) on 7 August 2015 as a Designated Player. He scored a goal in his debut for the club on 16 August, earning the second goal in a 4–0 win over Orlando City SC at CenturyLink Field, Seattle.

==== 2016 season ====
Prior to the 2016 season, Primera División Paraguaya club Cerro Porteño announced their second attempt in the space of six months to sign Valdez. Valdez admitted that he maintains contact with club president Juan José Zapag and that what remained for him in his career to achieve is to play in the Copa Libertadores, but he indicated that the transfer seemed difficult to occur. Sources stated that Valdez's price was too great whilst Valdez said that he desires to continue playing abroad.

Colombian Categoría Primera A clubs Independiente Medellín and Atlético Nacional showed interest in the player and reports suggested that Valdez was to depart Seattle Sounders. On 18 January 2016, Valdez publicly responded to reports about his arrival to Medellín: "I'm proud to be a Sounder and very happy in Seattle. Don't want to raise somebody's hopes or disappoint my fans!"

Valdez also revealed that he had received and rejected million-dollar offers from clubs in China, which he responded that he did not want to know anything about it.

Valdez' first competitive appearances came in the home and away legs of the 2015–16 CONCACAF Champions League quarter final stages against Mexican club América; on 23 February 2016, Valdez played 73 minutes of the 2–2 draw in Seattle before being substituted off of the field. In the return leg on 2 March 2016, Valdez played a full 90 minutes of the fixture which concluded 3–1 in favor of América and ended 5–3 on aggregate. His contract ran until December 2016.

During the 2016 MLS Cup Playoffs, Valdez scored his only two goals of the season, helping Seattle advance to the MLS Cup, where they won their first league championship.

=== Cerro Porteño ===
On 4 January 2017, Valdez signed with Primera División Paraguaya club Cerro Porteño.

After not renewing with Cerro Porteño, Haedo Valdez expressed that he wanted to play for one more year and that if he had to return to Atlético Tembetary, he would without problems.

Following Valdez' departure from Cerro Porteño, he was in conversations with Sol de America president and also turned down an offer from Guireña due to family reasons at the beginning of 2021. He was also linked with Primera División Argentina club Argentinos Juniors as a very close signing, which was reported in the Argentine press. Following this, Valdez announced that his family and himself were diagnosed with COVID-19 whilst being in Germany.

On 1 July 2021, Haedo Valdéz announced his retirement through his social media channel.

== International career ==
=== 2003–2006 ===
In 2003, Valdez rejected the chance to play for the Germany national under-21 team in favour of Paraguay, having been invited to trial with Germany U21 by coach Jürgen Kohler, he was eventually selected to represent the Paraguay under-20 national team at the 2003 FIFA U-20 World Cup in the United Arab Emirates. Prior to this, Valdez had been unheard of from his under-20 teammates and coach, Rolando Chilavert, brother of José Luís Chilavert, and was selected due to his presence in German football. Valdez did not know the names of any of his teammates from the squad and eventually met them on the airplane. Paraguay's U20 squad had already finished third at the 2003 South American Youth Championship, and eventually qualified for the FIFA U20 World Cup. Valdez was one of three players based outside of Paraguay, alongside Dante López at Israel's Maccabi Haifa and Víctor Hugo Mareco at Italian club Brescia. The squad also featured players such as Édgar Barreto, Julio dos Santos, Ernesto Cristaldo and Erwin Avalos, with several of these players going on to represent Paraguay U23 at the 2004 Summer Olympics. Valdez featured in all three group-stage fixtures against United States, South Korea and Germany, scoring Paraguay's second goal against Germany in their 2–0 victory, which resulted in Paraguay finished in second position of their group with six points. During the competition, Valdez humorously revealed to Paraguayan newspaper ABC that in the fixture against Germany U20, he faced his Werder Bremen teammates Christian Schulz and Alexander Walke who made a bet with him that if he would score a goal then one of his teammates would owe him a dinner and would pay for his meal. Valdez then featured in Paraguay's round of 16 clash against Spain U20, where which Paraguay were beaten 1–0.

Valdez was part of the Paraguay 22-man squad at the 2004 Copa América in Peru. Playing in two of Paraguay's three group stage games as Paraguay finished in first place and were drawn against Uruguay in the quarter-finals. Valdez played in the quarter-final which Paraguay lost 3–1.

Following the Copa América, while Valdez and his colleagues of the Paraguay under-23 squad were preparing for the 2004 Summer Olympics before his club Werder Bremen requested his return. Valdez dutifully complied with his club's orders and subsequently missed out on the opportunity to claim a silver medal as Paraguay U23 finished in second place at the competition.

Valdez scored his first goal for the senior Paraguay squad in a game against El Salvador on 17 August 2005. During the 2006 FIFA World cup qualification campaign, Valdez scored after 64 minutes in a 1–0 away win against Venezuela on 8 October 2005. Paraguay finished fourth with 28 points as Valdez was selected for the final 23-man squad for the tournament, where he was handed the number 18 shirt.

At the 2006 World Cup, Valdez started in Paraguay's opening Group B clash against England, which they lost 1–0. After a solid performance from Valdez against Sweden in the second match, Paraguay would lose 1–0 after 89 minutes and be eliminated from the tournament. Valdez would play 66 minutes of Paraguay's final group stage fixture against Trinidad and Tobago, which they won 2–0, as he was replaced by Nelson Cuevas.

=== 2007–2010 ===
Valdez was not included in Paraguay's squad for the 2007 Copa América in Venezuela, however a few months later, he took part in the 2010 World Cup qualifiers. He opened his goal scoring account in round two of the qualifiers scoring in a 1–0 win against Uruguay on 7 October 2007. Paraguay were undefeated until round six where they had lost 4–2 against Bolivia in La Paz; Valdez scored his third goal of the qualifiers.

On 9 September 2009, in Asunción in the round 16 of the qualifiers, Valdez scored after 27 minutes of the first half to give Paraguay a 1–0 lead against Argentina; Paraguay won the game 1–0 and qualified for the 2010 World Cup. Paraguay finished the campaign in third spot, behind Brazil and Chile, with 33 points as Valdez had scored five times in 17 appearances.

Valdez was selected in the 23-man squad for the 2010 World Cup. Paraguay were grouped with Slovakia, New Zealand and Italy; Valdez participated in all three matches as Paraguay finished top of its group with five points. In the round of 16, Paraguay faced Japan where they drew 0–0 after extra-time. Valdez replaced Édgar Benítez after 60 minutes and played until extra-time had finished. The match was decided by a Penalty shootout, Valdez converted his, and Paraguay's fourth, spot kick and eventually won the shootout 5–3. Paraguay faced Spain in the quarter-finals. During the first-half, Valdez scored past goalkeeper Iker Casillas, but had the goal ruled out as offside. Paraguay eventually lost the game 1–0.

=== 2011–2014 ===
Valdez was selected in the squad for the 2011 Copa América where Paraguay had been drawn in Group B with Brazil, Ecuador and Venezuela. During a friendly fixture several days prior to the Copa América, Valdez had scored his 11th national team goal in a 2–0 home victory against Romania on 11 June 2011.

In Paraguay's opening group stage fixture on 3 July 2011, Valdez was substituted onto the field on 73 minutes for Lucas Barrios as Paraguay drew 0–0 with Ecuador. On 9 July 2011, Paraguay faced Brazil when Valdez was substituted onto the field on 56 minutes for a yellow-carded Barrios while Paraguay were drawing 1–1 with Brazil. Valdez then scored a goal on 66 minutes as Paraguay took the lead to 2–1. Brazil eventually levelled the score on 89 minutes as the game finished at 2–2.

Valdez played a big part in Paraguay's 2014 World Cup qualification campaign, featuring in 11 qualification fixtures as Paraguay failed to qualify for the competition. Preceding a 2–0 defeat against Colombia in October 2012 which saw Paraguay bottom of the qualifiers table with only four points, Valdez responded in anger to Paraguayan fans that criticized the squad for their results: "I appreciate with my whole heart those few who continue to support us. In change, I lament the rest. We come here for shit money and they treat us like this? From one day to another, they forget about all the joy we gave them." It was during Paraguay's frustrated 2014 World Cup qualification campaign that Valdez informed Paraguay.com that the unsuccessful campaign was the price that the national team was paying for the replacement of coaches and transition of players since the 2010 World Cup. Valdez referred to the new base of the national team of not capturing what the Albirroja represents and that there were players who were still immature and did not know what it meant to be there representing the national team. In 2013, when new coach Victor Genes was appointed, Valdez was left out of Paraguay's team for a friendly against Germany and two World Cup qualifiers against Bolivia and Argentina.

=== 2015–2017 ===
On 28 May 2015, Valdez was included in Paraguay's 23-man squad for the 2015 Copa América by coach Ramón Díaz. During a friendly fixture against Honduras on 6 June 2015, Valdez received his first expulsion for the national team after he retaliated having gone to header the ball but was instead hit in the left side of the chest with the studs of Honduran player Maynor Figueroa, who had lifted his leg high enough to make contact with Valdez. Valdez exited the field of play lifting his shirt to reveal for himself the mark that had been left from the player's studs and then applauding the crowd in appreciation for their attendance. Valdez then publicly apologized and stated that surely it would not occur again.

It appeared that Valdez was ineligible to participate in Paraguay's opening group stage fixture against Argentina, however this was not the case. Valdez was in the starting XI in their opening fixture on 13 June 2015. He scored the Paraguay's first goal from approximately 25 yards in their 2–2 draw against Argentina in La Serena as Paraguay recovered from a 0–2 deficit. After the draw, Valdez received the MasterCard Man of the Match award. It was reported that initially the award was given to Lionel Messi, who declined it, and it was also reported that Argentina had rejected the opportunity for another Argentine player to receive it, before the award was given to Valdez.

== Coaching career ==
In June 2022, SV Werder Bremen announced that Valdez returned to the club as an assistant coach for their reserves squad SV Werder Bremen II.

On 25 May 2026, Club Libertad announced that Haedo Valdez was the club’s principle team coach in replacement of Juan Samudio and was presented by Horacio Cartes and Ruben Di Tore. On 1 November, however, he was sacked.

== Personal life ==
In 2003, during an interview with Paraguayan newspaper ABC, it was reported that Valdez was an admirer of Ronaldo and Roque Santa Cruz. Valdez also stated that grew up being a fan of Primera División Paraguaya club Cerro Porteño and that his idols were Francisco Arce and Carlos Gamarra, when the club were crowned champions vía penalties in 1994.

Valdez is married to Martynka Haedo Valdez since 2008 and has two children named Nelson Samuel and Noemi Beata Haedo Valdez(registration required) His parents, Antonio Haedo and Silvia Valdez, and family in Paraguay live in Coronel Oviedo, which is the capital city of the Caaguazú Department where Valdez's place of birth, the San Joaquín District is located. Valdez and his wife created a foundation, which provides his birthplace, San Joaquin, with £8,285 per month and buys 1,500 children presents every Christmas. San Joaquin depends on Valdez as he provides the people with a better chance than he ever had. Whilst playing for Dortmund, Valdez's cousin, César Nelson, stayed in Dortmund and aided Valdez by regulating all matters affecting San Joaquin.

In 2009, Valdez once, gun in hand, chased off thieves stealing his car and on another occasion ran into his blazing home to save his dog. On 23 December 2009, it was reported that upon returning home with his wife in the early hours of the morning, they found their house in flames as a fire eventually destroyed their house. No member of their family was hurt, however, the family suffered the loss of their Golden Retriever dog named Arami, that Valdez had gifted to his wife. Months before this incident, however, in the same house, burglars intended to steal Valdez's Mercedes-Benz and Valdez himself had faced the burglars with a shotgun blast in order to prevent the theft.

Valdez's niece is Argentine-Paraguayan model Samira López.

In February 2014, it was reported that Valdez insisted on ways to financial help former national teammate Salvador Cabañas, who had suffered economic issues since being shot in the head in January 2010, and it was ultimately decided that Valdez would organize a charity match scheduled for June 2014 which would feature the likes of David Trezeguet and Javier Saviola in order to raise funds for Cabañas.

In late November 2014, it was reported that Valdez would open a restaurant in December in Bremen with his in-laws, Beata and Fritz Rößler.

On 29 and 30 January 2022, diverse Paraguayan newspapers reported that five people were arrested for attempting to kidnapp one of Haedo Valdez's family members in the area of San Joaquín in the Caaguazu Department.

== Career statistics ==
=== Club ===
As of 22 December 2020

Appearances and goals by club, season and competition
Club	Season	League			National cup (Note: Includes DFB-Pokal, Russian Cup, Copa del Rey, UAE President's Cup, Greek Football Cup, U.S. Open Cup)		Continental		Other		Total	
Club	Season	Division	Apps	Goals	Apps	Goals	Apps	Goals	Apps	Goals	Apps	Goals
Tembetary	2000				–		–					
Tembetary	2001				–		–					
Tembetary	Total		22	11	–		–				22	11
Werder Bremen	2002–03	Bundesliga	2	0	1	0	0	0	–		3	0
Werder Bremen	2003–04	Bundesliga	21	5	5	1	0	0	–		26	6
Werder Bremen	2004–05	Bundesliga	27	7	4	2	8 (Note: Appearances in UEFA Champions League)	2	0	0	39	11
Werder Bremen	2005–06	Bundesliga	30	9	3	0	9	2	0	0	42	11
Werder Bremen	Total		80	21	13	3	17	4	0	0	110	28
Borussia Dortmund	2006–07	Bundesliga	29	1	2	1	—		—		31	2
Borussia Dortmund	2007–08	Bundesliga	27	2	3	0	—		—		30	2
Borussia Dortmund	2008–09	Bundesliga	29	7	3	1	2 (Note: Appearances in UEFA Europa League)	0	—		34	8
Borussia Dortmund	2009–10	Bundesliga	28	5	3	0	—		—		31	5
Borussia Dortmund	Total		113	15	11	2	2	0	—		126	17
Hércules	2010–11	La Liga	26	8	0	0	—		—		26	8
Rubin Kazan	2011–12	Russian Premier League	17	3	2	0	8	3	—		27	6
Rubin Kazan	2012–13	Russian Premier League	3	0	0	0	0	0	1 (Note: Appearance in Russian Super Cup)	0	4	0
Rubin Kazan	Total		20	3	2	0	8	3	1	0	31	6
Valencia	2012–13	La Liga	28	6	5	2	7	1	—		40	9
Al Jazira	2013–14	UAE Pro League	12	4	2	0	—		—		14	4
Olympiacos	2013–14	Super League Greece	10	6	2	0	2	0	—		14	6
Eintracht Frankfurt	2014–15	Bundesliga	2	0	1	0	—		1	0	4	0
Seattle Sounders FC	2015	MLS	7	1	3	1	—		—		10	2
Seattle Sounders FC	2016	MLS	24	0	2	2	—		1	1	27	3
Seattle Sounders FC	Total		31	1	5	3	—		1	1	37	5
Cerro Porteño	2017	Paraguayan Primera División	23	1	—		4 (Note: Appearances in Copa Sudamericana)	2	—		27	3
Cerro Porteño	2018	Paraguayan Primera División	21	6	—		6 (Note: Appearances in Copa Libertadores)	2	—		27	8
Cerro Porteño	2019	Paraguayan Primera División	27	10	—		10	4	—		37	14
Cerro Porteño	2020	Paraguayan Primera División	12	3	—		3	0	—		15	3
Cerro Porteño	Total		83	20	—		23	8	—		106	28
Career total			396	94	36	7	59	16	3	1	490	117

=== International ===
Appearances and goals by national team and year
National team	Year	Apps	Goals
Paraguay	2004	4	0
Paraguay	2005	4	2
Paraguay	2006	6	2
Paraguay	2007	6	2
Paraguay	2008	9	2
Paraguay	2009	9	1
Paraguay	2010	8	1
Paraguay	2011	11	2
Paraguay	2012	5	0
Paraguay	2013	3	0
Paraguay	2014	1	0
Paraguay	2015	7	1
Paraguay	2016	2	0
Paraguay	2017	1	0
Total		77	13

Scores and results list Paraguay U20's goal tally first, score column indicates score after each Valdez goal.

List of international goals scored by Nelson Valdez
No.	Date	Venue	Opponent	Score	Result	Competition
1	5 December 2003	Al-Nahyan Stadium, Abu Dhabi, United Arab Emirates	Germany	2–0	2–0	2003 FIFA World Youth Championship

Scores and results list Paraguay's goal tally first, score column indicates score after each Valdez goal.

List of international goals scored by Nelson Valdez
No.	Date	Venue	Opponent	Score	Result	Competition
1	17 August 2005	Estadio Antonio Oddone Sarubbi, Ciudad del Este, Paraguay	El Salvador		3–0	Friendly
2	8 October 2005	Estadio José Pachencho Romero, Maracaibo, Venezuela	Venezuela		1–0	2006 FIFA World Cup qualification
3	24 May 2006	Ullevaal Stadion, Oslo, Norway	Norway		2–2	Friendly
4	31 May 2006	Birkenwiese Dornbirn, Dornbirn, Austria	Georgia		1–0	Friendly
5	17 October 2007	Estadio Defensores del Chaco, Asunción, Paraguay	Uruguay		1–0	2010 FIFA World Cup qualification
6	17 November 2007	Estadio Defensores del Chaco, Asunción, Paraguay	Ecuador		5–1	2010 FIFA World Cup qualification
7	18 June 2008	Estadio Hernando Siles La Paz, Bolivia	Bolivia		2–4	2010 FIFA World Cup qualification
8	9 September 2008	Estadio Defensores del Chaco, Asunción, Paraguay	Venezuela		2–0	2010 FIFA World Cup qualification
9	9 September 2009	Estadio Defensores del Chaco, Asunción, Paraguay	Argentina		1–0	2010 FIFA World Cup qualification
10	12 October 2010	Westpac Stadium, Wellington, New Zealand	New Zealand		2–0	Friendly
11	11 June 2011	Estadio Defensores del Chaco, Asunción, Paraguay	Romania		2–0	Friendly
12	9 July 2011	Estadio Mario Alberto Kempes, Córdoba, Argentina	Brazil		2–2	2011 Copa América
13	13 June 2015	Estadio La Portada, La Serena, Chile	Argentina		2–2	2015 Copa América

== Honours ==
=== Club ===
Werder Bremen

- Bundesliga: 2003–04
- DFB-Pokal: 2003–04

Borussia Dortmund

- DFB-Pokal runner-up: 2007–08

Rubin Kazan

- Russian Cup: 2011–12
- Russian Super Cup: 2012

Olympiacos

- Super League Greece: 2013–14

Seattle Sounders FC

- MLS Cup: 2016

Cerro Porteño

- Primera División: 2017 Clausura, 2020 Apertura

=== International ===
Paraguay

- Copa América: runner-up 2011

=== Individual ===
- Best Paraguayan footballer abroad (APF): 2010
- Best Paraguayan footballer abroad (Premios Guaraní – Canal 2 Red Guaraní): 2010
- Most favourite player of Albirroja (Premios Guaraní – Canal 2 Red Guaraní): 2010
- Special Consideration (President of Paraguayan Republic: Fernando Lugo): 2010
