= Route 2 (Paraguay) =

Road in Paraguay

National Route 02
- Ruta nacional PY02
- Mcal. José Félix Estigarribia
- PY02 highlighted in red

Route information
- Length: 343 km (213 mi)

Major junctions
- West end: Asunción
- PY01 in San Lorenzo, CE PY08 in Coronel Oviedo, CG; PY13 in Caaguazú, CG; PY06 in Minga Guazú, AP PY07 in Ciudad del Este, AP
- East end: Ciudad del Este

Location
- Country: Paraguay

Highway system
- Highways in Paraguay

National Route Number 2 (officially, PY02, better known as Ruta Dos) is one of the most important highways in Paraguay, which connects the two major cities in the country, Asunción and Ciudad del Este. Crossing the departments of Central, Cordillera, Caaguazu and Alto Paraná.

In 2019, the 140 kilometres (87 mi) between Ciudad del Este and Caaguazú were doubled. In 2024, the duplication of 149 kilometres (93 mi) of the highway between the cities of Ypacaraí and Caaguazú was completed. So, the first duplicated highway in Paraguay was created. The highway is the most important in the country, as it connects the capital Asunción with the second largest city (Cuidad del Este), with Brazil (the country's largest trading partner) and finally with the Port of Paranaguá.

== Notable sites of interest ==
The National Museum of Natural History of Paraguay (MNHNP) is located right next to the PY02 highway, in San Lorenzo.

== Distances and important cities ==
The following table shows the distances traversed by National Route 2 in each different department, and important cities that it passes by (or near).

Km	City	Department	Junctions/Tolls
0	Asunción	Asunción	
6	Fernando de la Mora	Central	
10	San Lorenzo	Central	PY01
19	Capiatá	Central	
29	Itauguá	Central	
36	Ypacaraí	Central	
52	Caacupé	Cordillera	
71	Eusebio Ayala	Cordillera	
86	Itacurubí de la Cordillera	Cordillera	
101	San José de los Arroyos	Caaguazu	
123	Nueva Londres	Caaguazu	
132	Coronel Oviedo	Caaguazu	PY08
179	Caaguazú	Caaguazú	PY13
204	Doctor Juan Manuel Frutos	Caaguazú	
216	Doctor J. Eulogio Estigarribia	Caaguazú	
244	José Domingo Ocampos	Caaguazú	
250	Juan Emilio O'Leary	Alto Paraná	
262	Doctor Juan León Mallorquín	Alto Paraná	
288	Yguazú	Alto Paraná	
312	Minga Guazú	Alto Paraná	PY06/
327	Ciudad del Este	Alto Paraná	PY07
