= Nacunday National Park =

Coordinates: 26°02′55″S 54°40′15″W

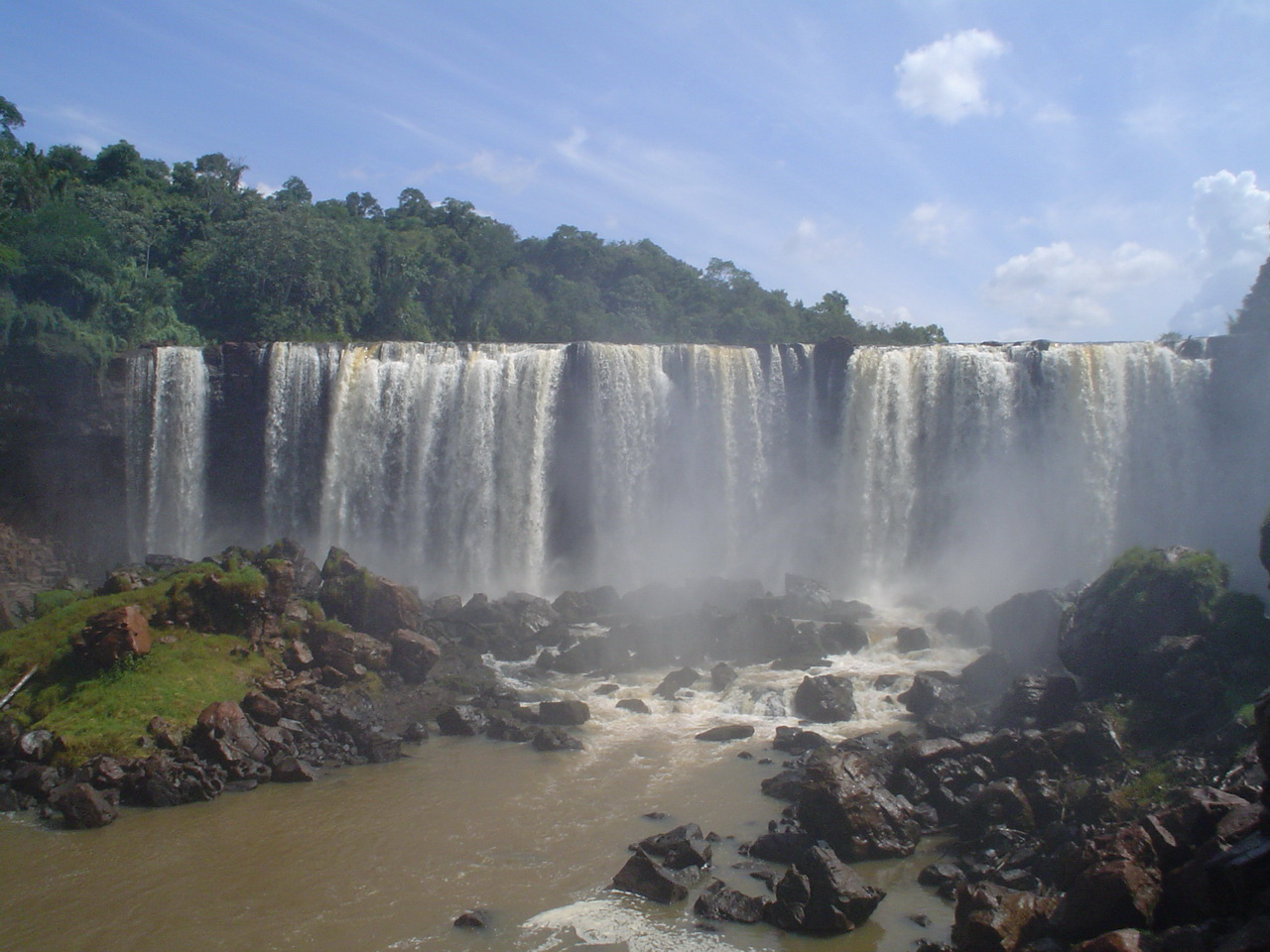
Panoramic view on Salto de Ñacunday

Ñacunday National Park is a national park, located in the district of Ñacunday, Alto Paraná, in Paraguay, situated between the latitude 26°03’ and longitude 54°42’. It covers an area of 20 square kilometres. In the park is located large waterfall - the 35 – 40 m tall and 110 m wide Salto Ñacunday.

== Climate ==
The climate is sub-tropical, with abundant and well-distributed precipitations, with an average of 1,500 to 1,700 mm annually. The average temperature is 21.5 °C, with predominant winds from the north, which corresponds to the geographic location of the Amazon rainforest.

== Flora ==
The predominant vegetation of the park is the Alto Paraná Atlantic forest, formed primarily by trees that usually reach 15 to 20 meters of high, with abundant specimens of the family Meliaceae, such as: the Argentine cedar (Cedrela fissilis), katigua pytâ (Trichilla catigua); family Arecaceae: palmito (Euterpe edulis); and family Myrtaceae: ñangapiry (Eugenia enflora), yvaporaity (Myrciaria rivularis). Secondly by a forest of tall trees of wide leaves. This kind of forest is easily recognized because of its general appearance, with trees that can reach 35 meters of high, with predominance of the family Fabaceae, such as: the yvyrá pytâ (Peltophorum dubium), yvyrá ro (Pterogyne nitens); the family Boraginaceae: petereby (Cordia dichotoma); and the family Moraceae: tatajyva (Cholorophora tinctoria) and amba’y (Cecropia pachystachya). Aside from these forests, the park also has a riparian forest, with smaller specimens, mostly of the family Euphorbiaceae. It also has, a diversity of ferns and orchids.

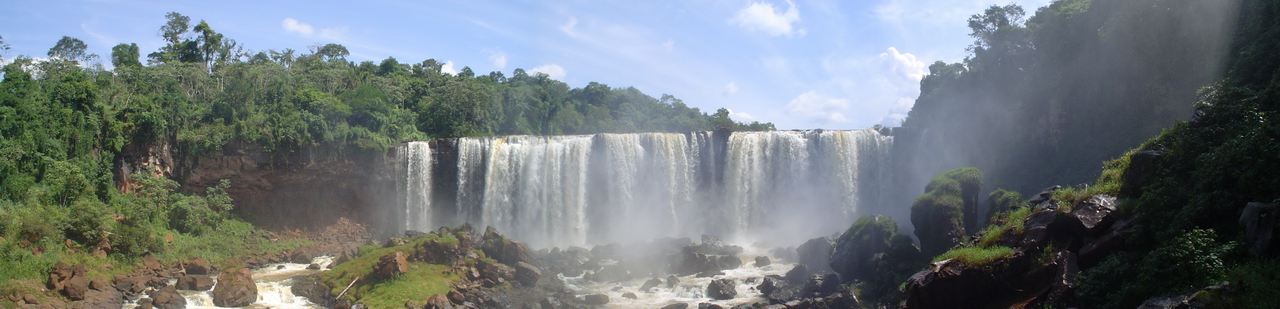
Panoramic view of the Salto Ñacunday

== Fauna ==
All different species of animals, such as mammals, birds, rodents and reptiles live in the area of the park. The park also protects a stretch of the Ñacunday River, which, because of its length and volume, is habitat for a rich variety of fishes, especially in the area of its outlet to the Paraná River.

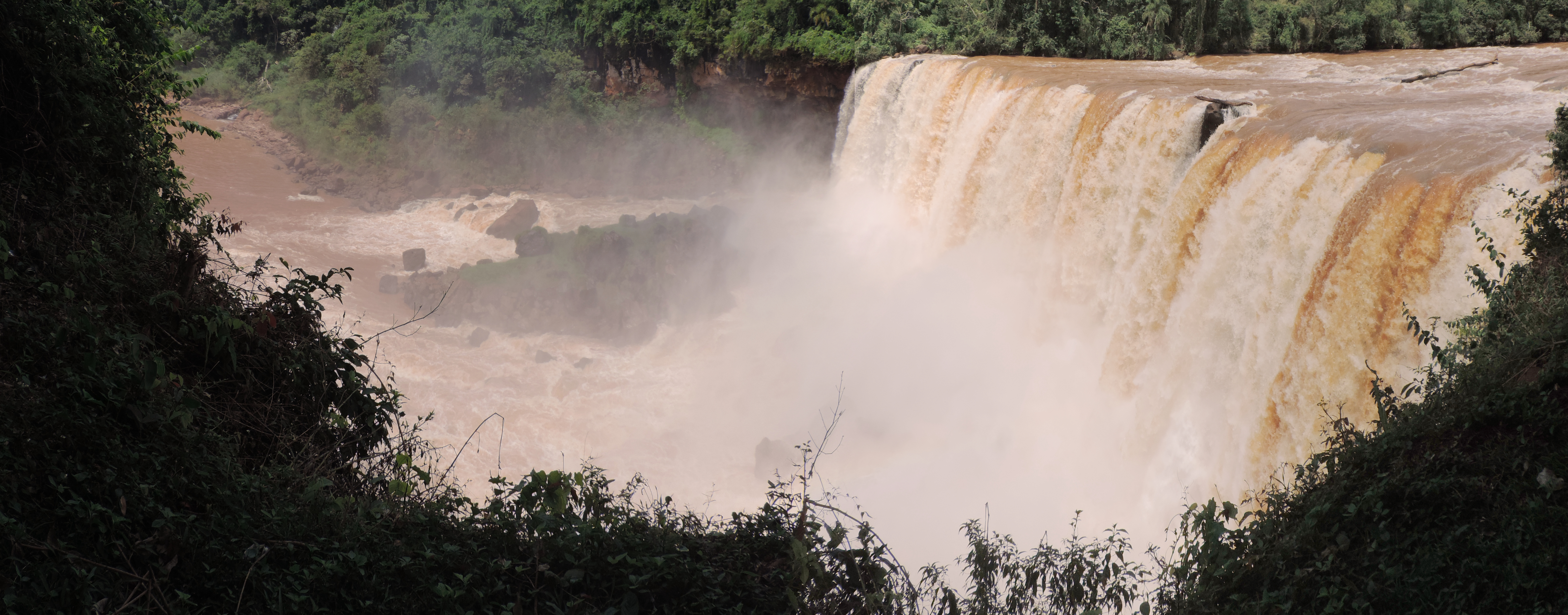
Salto de Ñacunday, Southern Paraguay

== Hydrography ==
The park protects the sources of water, streams, a stretch of the Ñacunday River, which forms Salto Ñacunday - approximately 35 – 40 meters high waterfall some 900 m from the mouth of Ñacunday River. River provides water to the Mbyá Guaraní villages of the area for their daily activities, sometimes the river is used for recreation.

== Tourism ==
This park is distinctive because its unique beautiful landscape provided by the Salto Ñacunday, which is the most important waterfall in the country, after the now disappeared Salto del Guairá. The waterfall is approximately 40 – 35 meters high and 110 meters wide, and is located 9000 meters before the outlet to the Paraná River. Right under the waterfall there is an island that was formed with time, by the logs of wood that fell down the precipice. In spite of not having a tourist program, the number of visitants, Paraguayan and foreign, is increasing, especially in the summer.

== Legal aspect ==
The Ñacunday National Park, located on 26°03’ latitude South and 54°42’ longitude West, with an area of 20 km^{2}. It was created in the category of Ñacunday Protector Forest, by decree N° 17.071 on August 20, 1975 with an extension of 10 km^{2}, including the Salto Ñacunday and was later expanded by decree N° 16.146 on January 18, 1993, including some modifications. These modifications refer to the creation of the Ñacunday National Park with 20 km^{2}, instead of the Ñacunday Protector Forest and the Yacuy Protector Forest.

== Mbya Guaraní ==
The Mbya Guaraní (who live in the park) natives are the ones who mostly use it and the nearby area. They collect firewood, honey, fruits and medicinal plants; also is the natural environment where they practice their traditional ceremonies. The locals use it to do fishing and hunting of not endangered animals. The nearby area is used for agriculture and in less proportion for cattle.

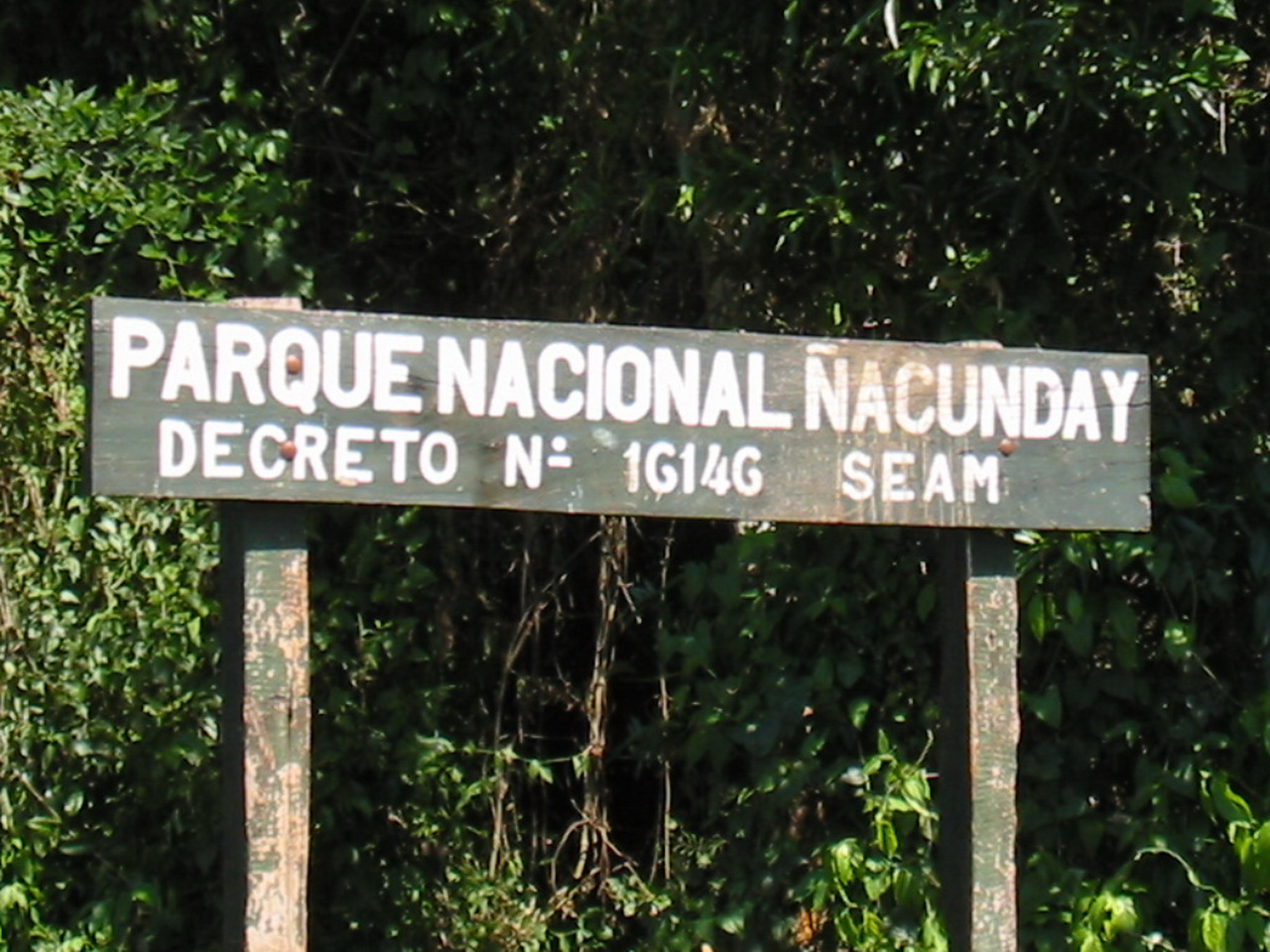
Entrance in the park

== Access ==
From Asunción, the highway to take is the: Route 2. The access to the park is through a route that goes from Ciudad del Este to Los Cedrales, a paved road to the Municipality that becomes after, a dirt road. It is 90 km away from Ciudad del Este. Another access is through route N° 6, which connects Ciudad del Este with Encarnación.
