= Emiliana Escalada =

Emiliana Escalada (1884-1962) was a Paraguayan pharmacist, teacher, feminist and trade union leader.

== Life ==
Emiliana Escalada was born in Coronel Oviedo in 1884. She represented Paraguay in the first International Congress of Teachers, held in Montevideo. She died March 29, 1962.
