= Tres de Febrero, Paraguay =

Coordinates: 25°15′S 55°47′W

Tres de Febrero
- District
- Location within Paraguay
- Country: Paraguay
- Department: Caaguazú
- Time zone: -4 Gmt

Tres de Febrero is a district in the department of Caaguazú, Paraguay.
