= Mariscal Francisco Solano López =

- Location within Paraguay
- Coordinates: 25.2400°S 55.0764°W
- Country: Paraguay
- Department: Caaguazú

Government
  - Intendant: Nestor Favián Martinez Bernal (ANR)

Population (2002)
  - Total: 7,330
- Time zone: -4 UTC

Mariscal Francisco Solano López is a district in the Caaguazú department of Paraguay.

== Sources ==
- World Gazeteer: Paraguay – World-Gazetteer.com
