= Yhú =

Yhú Yhũ (Guarani)
- Location within Paraguay
- Coordinates: 25°3′36″S 55°55′48″W
- Country: Paraguay
- Department: Caaguazú

Government
  - Intendant: Arturo Rey Jara Espinoza (ANR)

Population (2002)
  - Total: 34,737

Yhú is a district in the Caaguazú department of Paraguay. The name is derived from a Guaraní word for "black water."

== Sources ==
- World Gazeteer: Paraguay – World-Gazetteer.com
