= Route 6 (Paraguay) =

National Route 06
- Ruta nacional PY06
- Dr. Juan León Mallorquín
- PY06 highlighted in red

Route information
- Length: 252 km (157 mi)

Major junctions
- South end: Encarnación
- Route 1 in Encarnación, IT; Route 2 in Minga Guazú, AP
- North end: Minga Guazú

Location
- Country: Paraguay

Highway system
- Highways in Paraguay

National Route 6 (officially, Ruta Nacional Número 6 "Dr. Juan León Mallorquín", better known as Ruta Sexta) is one of the national highways of Paraguay. With a length of 252 km it mainly connects the second and third most populated cities in Paraguay, Ciudad del Este and Encarnación respectively. It crosses the departments of Alto Parana and Itapua.

== Distances and important cities ==
The following table shows the distances traversed by National Route 6 in each different department, and important cities that it passes by (or near).

Km	City	Department	Junctions
0	Encarnación	Itapua	Route 1
6	Capitán Miranda	Itapua	
21	Trinidad	Itapua	
35	Hohenau	Itapua	
38	Obligado	Itapua	
48	Bella Vista	Itapua	
71	Pirapó	Itapua	
87	Capitán Meza	Itapua	
93	Edelira	Itapua	
119	Tomás Romero Pereira	Itapua	
206	Santa Rita	Alto Parana	
247	Minga Guazú	Alto Parana	Route 7
