= Carayaó =

- Location within Paraguay
- Coordinates: 25°12′0″S 56°24′0″W
- Country: Paraguay
- Department: Caaguazú

Population (2008)
  - Total: 3 005

Carayaó is a town in the Caaguazú department of Paraguay.

== Etymology ==
Although there are differing versions as to how the city got its name, it is known to derive from a Classical Guarani compound made up of caraí ("blessed, holy") and aó·b ("clothes"). Folk etymology states that the city had a healer who used diseased people's clothes for his healings.

The Spanish reading of the name for the city was borrowed back into modern Guarani. Thus, the city is now called Karajao in Guarani.

== Sources ==
- World Gazeteer: Paraguay – World-Gazetteer.com
