= Gran Ciudad del Este =

Coordinates: 25°30′36″S 54°36′36″W

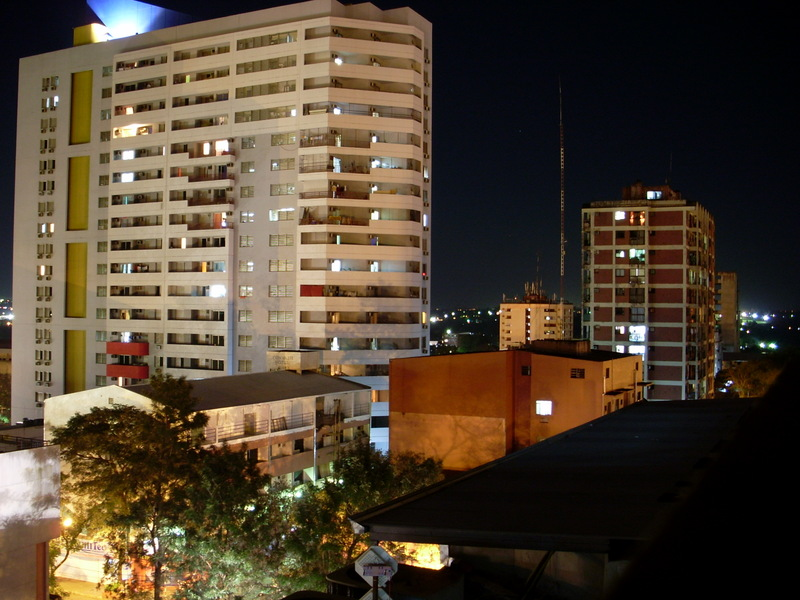

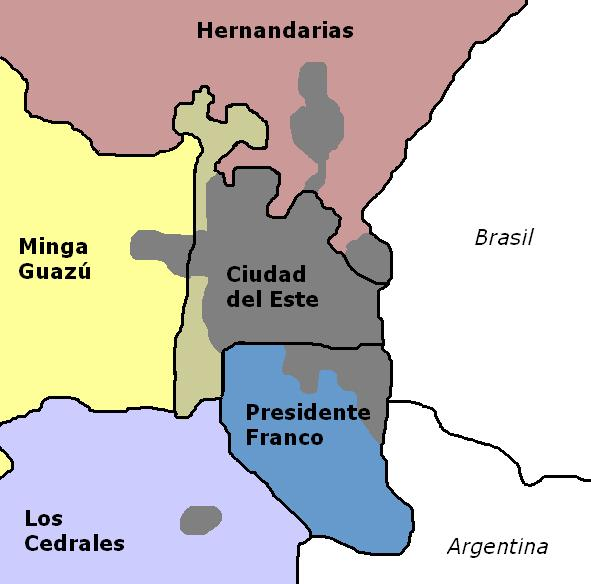
- Country: Paraguay
- Major Cities: Ciudad del Este; Hernandarias; Presidente Franco; Minga Guazú

Area
  - Metro: 1,017 km^{2} (393 sq mi)

Population (2016)
  - Metro: 546,643
  - Metro density: 549.4/km^{2} (1,423/sq mi)

The Greater Ciudad del Este is a metropolitan area in Paraguay consisting of most of the Alto Paraná Department. It is the second-largest metropolitan area in Paraguay, after the Gran Asunción, and has more than 500,000 inhabitants. In Spanish, it is referred to by various terms, including the Gran Ciudad del Este, Area Metropolitana de Ciudad del Este, and Metro Ciudad del Este.

== Transportation ==
=== Air ===
The Guarani International Airport in Minga Guazú connects this metropolitan area with other South American destinations.

== See also ==
- Gran Asunción.
- Ciudad del Este.
