= La Pastora =

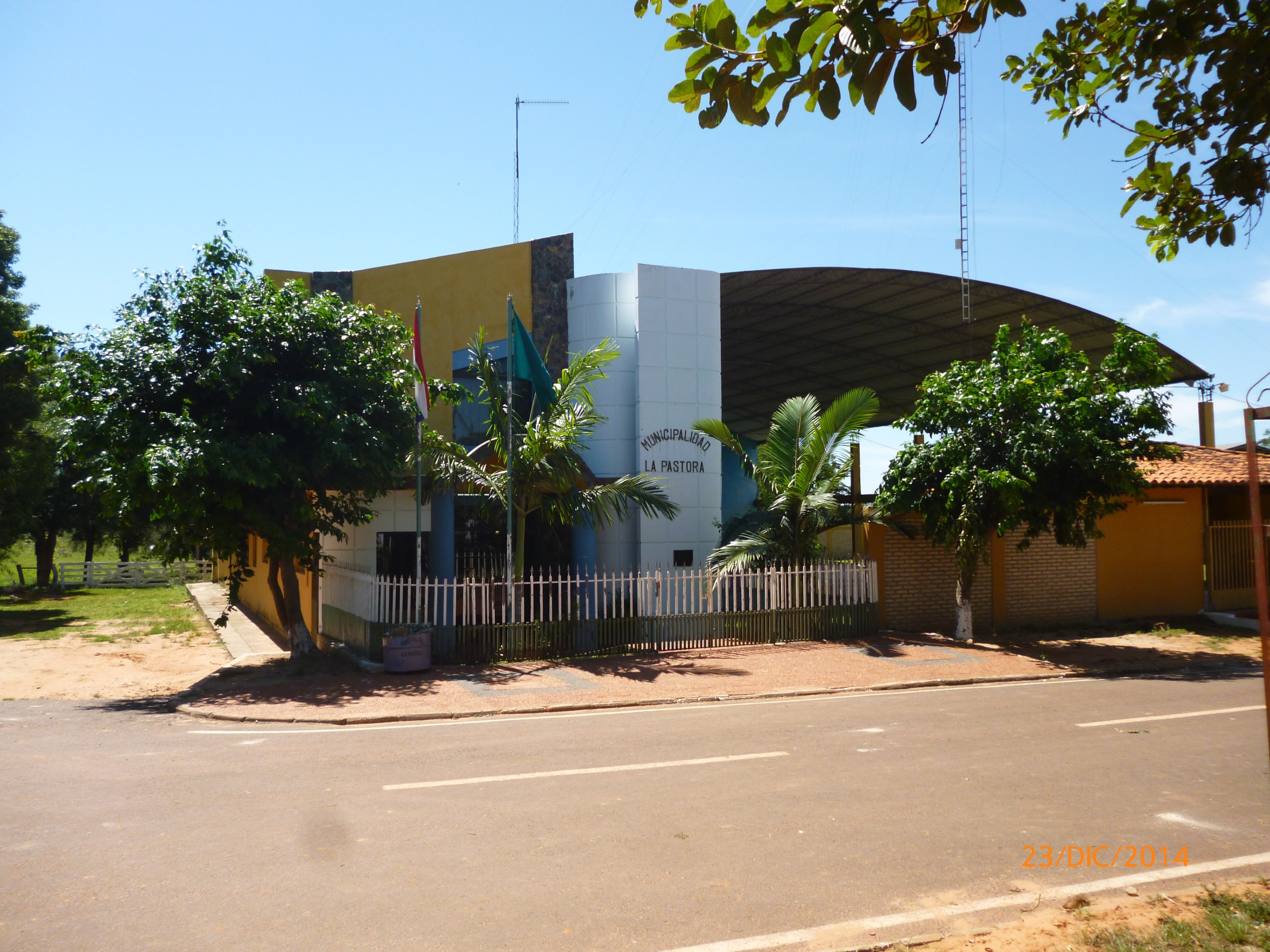
- Townhall of La Pastora

- Location within Paraguay
- Coordinates: 25°13′48″S 56°32′24″W
- Country: Paraguay
- Department: Caaguazú

Population (2008)
  - Total: 337

La Pastora is a town in the Caaguazú department of Paraguay.

== Sources ==
- World Gazeteer: Paraguay – World-Gazetteer.com
