= National Museum of Natural History of Paraguay =

Public state museum in San Lorenzo, Paraguay

National Museum of Natural History of Paraguay (MNHNP)

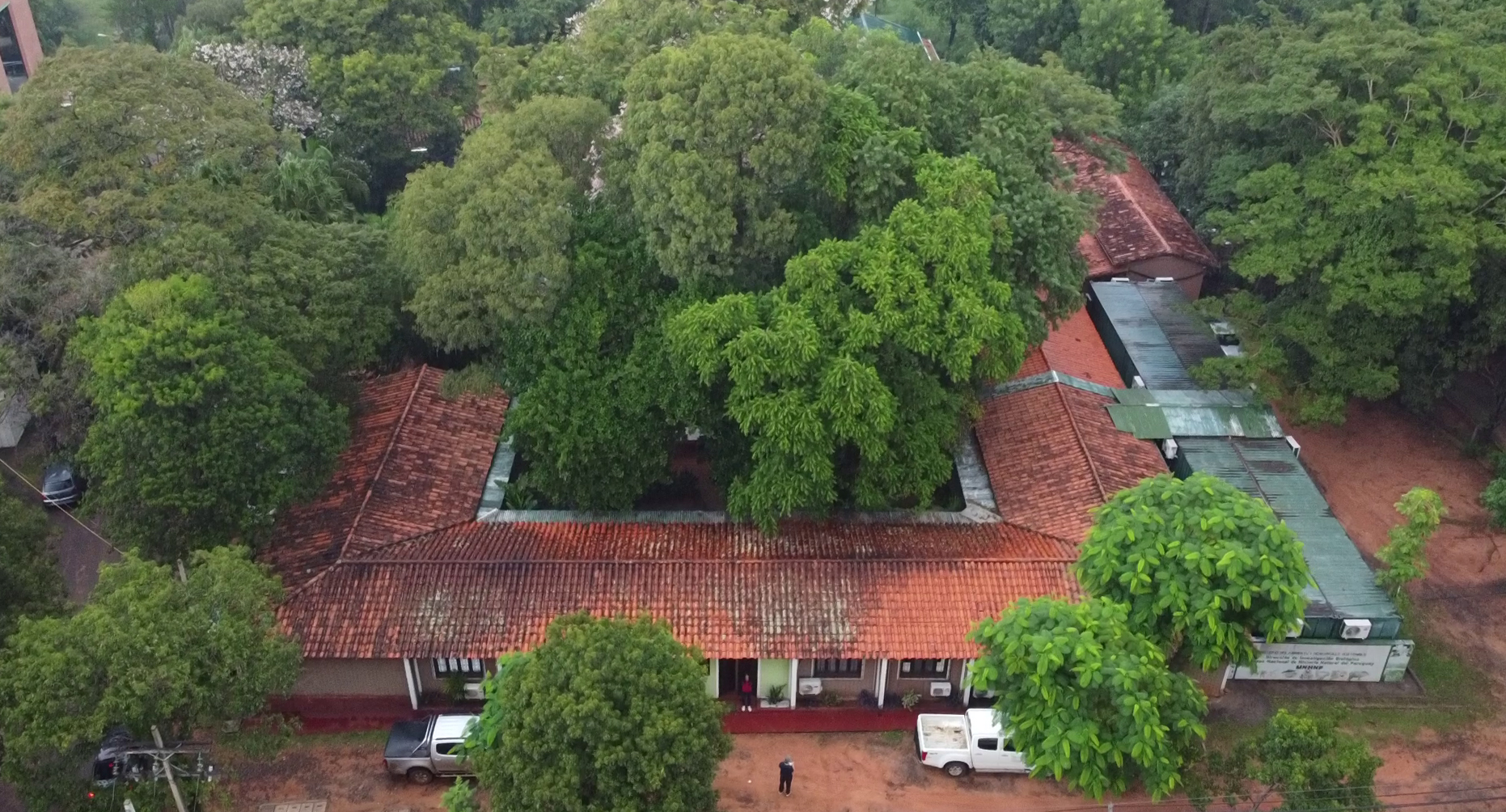
- An aerial view of the National Museum of Natural History of Paraguay (MNHNP), taken from a drone above the PY02 highway in San Lorenzo, Paraguay
- Former name: Inventario Biológico Nacional (IBN); Proyecto Inventario Biológico Nacional (PIBN)
- Established: April 1980
- Location: Ruta Mariscal Estigarribia, Km 13 1/2, San Lorenzo, Paraguay
- Coordinates: 25°20′20″S 57°31′28″W
- Type: Natural history
- Director: Dr. Reinilda Duré Rodas
- Public transit access: Bus 11 (Asunción - Areguá); Bus 29 (Anahi - San Lorenzo); Bus 45; Bus 52-26 (KM27 - Capiata); Bus 165 (Asunción - Hospital Nacional - Itauguá; Bus 220 (Asunción - Luque); Bus 5045

The National Museum of Natural History of Paraguay (MNHNP), officially known as the Dirección de Investigación Biológica / Museo Nacional de Historia Natural del Paraguay (DIB/MNHNP), is a state public museum, funded by the Paraguayan government, located in San Lorenzo, Central Department, Paraguay.

Its main objectives are to conserve, investigate, educate and communicate the knowledge generated through its collections, and to promote sustainable development in Paraguay. It is a fundamental institution for the study, conservation and teaching of biodiversity in Paraguay.

The museum houses specialists, specimen collections, laboratories and libraries. It is open to the public during weekdays from 8AM to 14PM, free of charge.

== Bulletin ==
The museum publishes a peer-reviewed scientific journal called "Boletín del Museo Nacional de Historia Natural del Paraguay", which features original research, reviews, and monographs in botany, zoology, paleontology, and descriptive geology. It focuses mostly on Paraguay and the Neotropical region. The journal is available freely online.

== Awards ==
In 2020, the museum was one of 5 finalists of the Museo del Año (Museum of the Year) award, an award organised by the "Paraguayan Association of Museologists and Museum Workers". In 2021, it was one of five finalists and in 2022, it was one of seven finalists.

== History ==
The precursor to, or former name of the museum is "Inventario Biológico Nacional" (IBN), and arose from an effort by the Ministry of Agriculture and Livestock (MAG) through the National Forest Service (SFN), together with Dana Good and David Good from the United States Peace Corps and the United States Fish and Wildlife Service (USFWS) who had arrived in Paraguay in 1977. Between 1978 and 1980 David Wood and Diane Wood focused most of their energy on launching the Inventario Biológico Nacional (IBN) and securing funds for storing and preserving the collections that would later result from the IBN fieldwork. The Woods found it important for Paraguay to have its own cadre of trained field biologists and a Natural History Museum, to go beyond foreign scientists carrying all knowledge and collections with them upon returning to their countries.

In a news article of November 2012, it was reported that the physical space of the museum was already insufficient for its collections and that its collections were at risk of seriously deteriorating due to lack of resources. The museum's director was Teresa Florentín Peña at that time. Luis Amarilla was leading the ornithology division. The museum housed 2205 bird samples at that time, spread across 400 species. Frederick Bauer was head of fish research. Specimens of 40 of the 41 fish families that existed in the country at that time were preserved in the museum. Dr. Reinilda Duré Rodas was in charge of the Flora department of the museum. There were around 20000 specimens of national flora part of the museum's collection at the time. Martha Motte was head of the herpetology division. In terms of herpetology, there were 11496 specimens cataloged and part of the museum's collections at the time, spread across 82 species of amphibians and 158 species of reptiles. A researcher present at the time, Isabel Gamarra de Fox, stressed that there was a large number of bats preserved in the museum, over 3000 specimens. It was reported that the government had plans to establish the new headquarters of the museum on a 6-hectare plot of land that would be ceded by the Ministry of Public Works and Communications, within the Guasu Metropolitan Park.

Starting from September 2016, infrastructure improvements were carried out at the museum through a partnership in which the Fondo de Conservación de Bosques Tropicales Paraguay (Tropical Forest Conservation Fund Paraguay) donated 425,484,000 Guaraníes and the Ministry of the Environment (SEAM) invested 130,000,000 Guaraníes. The project improved storage and conservation conditions for approximately 150,000 fauna and flora specimens.

Since June 2024, the museum has put on display in its courtyard one of the two Toyotas which were donated to the museum by the WWF in 1980 and which the precursor of the museum (Proyecto Inventario Biológico Nacional—PIBN, which existed for a little more than 10 years) used to carry out fieldwork.

== Collaboration with other museums ==
On the 18th of May 2025, the museum participated in the 7th edition of the "Los museos se muestran", which featured the exhibition of collections of 40 public and private museums from across Paraguay, which was held at the Juan de Salazar Spanish Cultural Center in Asunció, Paraguay, as a celebration for the international day of museums, and was open to the public free of charge.

In November 2025, the museum participated in the 1st edition of "Expo Museos", organized by the "Asociación Paraguaya de Museólogos y Trabajadores de Museos (AMUS)". This was a cultural activity to promote the visibility of museums.

The museum usually participates in the yearly national event "Noche de los museos" (Night of the museums).

In 2024, MuCi (Museo de Ciencias, to be the "Museo de Ciencias del Paraguay" futurely) launched an exhibition called "Cháke Bicho" about insects in Paraguay, in alliance with the Museum of Natural History of Paraguay.
