= Jürgen L. Born =

German banker

Jürgen Ludger Born (born 24 September 1940) is a German banker and the former chairman of the board of management of the German football team Werder Bremen. He resigned in 2009 when accused of misconduct in connection with a player transfer.

== Early life and education ==
Born was an only child. His father died when he was young. Born in Berlin, he grew up in Bremen, where he played football as a defender for TuS Schwachhausen in the 1960s. He emigrated to Argentina in 1969.

== Career ==
Born worked for more than 30 years in South America with Deutsche Bank, directing the bank's operations in Paraguay, Uruguay and Brazil; after his return to Germany, he was made a Uruguayan honorary consul.

In 1999, Born became chairman of the board of management of Werder Bremen, where he was also head of finances and public relations, but did not draw a salary. He played a major role in putting the club on a sound financial footing and also making it successful on the field; he drew on his South American contacts to assist in recruiting players.

In March 2009, Born was accused of accepting unauthorised payments in connection with the transfer of the Peruvian forward Roberto Silva to Werder Bremen in 2001. After Peruvian sources reported accusations of corruption in other player transfers, he resigned his positions with the club for the sake of its reputation. Accountants from PricewaterhouseCoopers, engaged by Werder Bremen to investigate the allegations, exonerated Born in their report, released in August 2009. The following month, the club awarded him a lifetime season pass to mark his official retirement; in 2011 they awarded him their Goldene Ehrennadel ('gold needle of honour').

In 2012, he published his autobiography, Die Born Identität, with the proceeds from its sales to be donated to charity. In the book and elsewhere, he accuses Willi Lemke, who succeeded him as chairman of the board at Werder Bremen, of presuming he was guilty of corruption.
