= Caaguazú Department =

Department of Paraguay

Caaguazú Departamento de Caaguazú (Spanish) Tetãvore Ka'aguasu (Guarani)
- Department
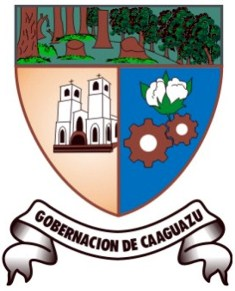
- Flag Coat of arms
- Etymology: Guarani: Ka’a guasu (big forest)
- Coordinates: 25°25′S 56°27′W
- Country: Paraguay
- Capital: Coronel Oviedo

Government
  - Governor: Marcelo Soto (ANR)

Area
  - Total: 11,474 km^{2} (4,430 sq mi)

Population (2022)
  - Total: 431,519
  - Density: 37.608/km^{2} (97.405/sq mi)
- Time zone: UTC-04 (AST)
  - Summer (DST): UTC-03 (ADT)
- ISO 3166 code: PY-5
- Number of Districts: 20

Caaguazú (Spanish pronunciation: [ka(a)ɣwaˈsu]) is a department in Paraguay. The capital is the city of Coronel Oviedo.

== History ==
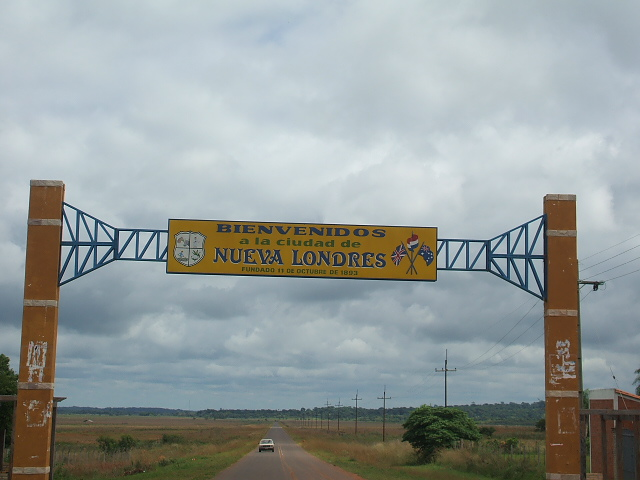
Entrance to the city of Nueva Londres

In the 16th and 17th centuries, European settlers in the present-day department of Caaguazú were threatened by the Portuguese Bandeirant and Guaicurú Indians, preventing permanent settlement of the land for many years.

In the 18th century, repopulation of Caaguazu began again. In 1712, Gregorio Bazán de Pedraza founded the Villa de San Isidro Labrador de Curuguaty, followed by Ybytimí in 1715, San Joaquín in 1746, and Carayaó in 1770.

In 1906, the area was assigned the name Yhú, including the departmental capital of Yhú, Ajos (present day Coronel Oviedo), Carayaó, San Joaquín and Caaguazú. Upon territorial reorganization in 1945, it was given the name of Caaguazú.

In 1973, the present-day territory and limits of this department were defined.

Caaguazú is the home department of several Paraguayan personalities, such as the writer Mario Halley Mora and the musician Cayo Sila Godoy.

The name "Caaguazú" (Ka'aguazu in Guaraní) means "great herb."

== Limits ==
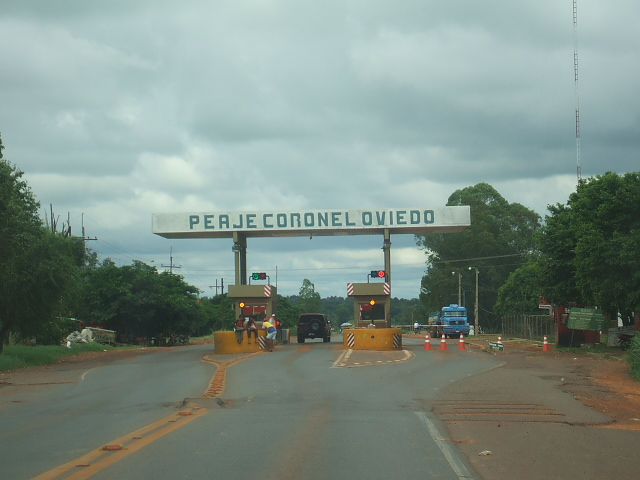
The toll of Coronel Oviedo, a few meters away from the entrance to Nueva Londres

Caaguazú is located in the middle of the Oriental Region of the country, between latitudes 24º30’ and 25º50’ S and longitudes 55º00’ and 56º45’ W.

Caaguazú is bordered:

- To the north by San Pedro and Canindeyú
- To the east by Alto Paraná
- To the west by Cordillera and Paraguarí
- To the south by Guairá and Caazapá

== Districts ==
The department is divided into 23 districts:

Districts	Population (2022)	Seat
1 Caaguazú District	98,200	Caaguazú
2 Carayaó District	10,832	Carayaó
3 Coronel Oviedo District	98,323	Coronel Oviedo
4 Doctor Cecilio Báez District	4,812	Doctor Cecilio Báez
5 Doctor Juan Eulogio Estigarribia District	38,894	Doctor Juan Eulogio Estigarribia
6 Doctor Juan Manuel Frutos District	20,451	Doctor Juan Manuel Frutos
7 José Domingo Ocampos District	7,459	José Domingo Ocampos
8 La Pastora District	3,294	La Pastora
9 Mariscal Francisco Solano López District	5,338	Mariscal Francisco Solano López
10 Nueva Londres District	3,594	Nueva Londres
11 Raúl Arsenio Oviedo District	12,543	Raúl Arsenio Oviedo
12 Repatriación District	24,459	Repatriación
13 Tres Corrales District	6,021	R. I. Tres Corrales
14 San Joaquín District	11,949	San Joaquín
15 San José de los Arroyos District	13,926	San José de los Arroyos
16 Santa Rosa del Mbutuy District	8,467	Santa Rosa del Mbutuy
17 Simón Bolívar District	4,740	Simón Bolívar
18 Tres de Febrero District	7,492	Tres de Febrero
19 Vaquería District	10,498	Vaquería
20 Yhú District	34,737	Yhú
n/a Tembiaporá District	22,524	Tembiaporá
n/a Nueva Toledo District	4,826	Nueva Toledo
n/a Doctor Blás Garay District	?	Doctor Blas Garay

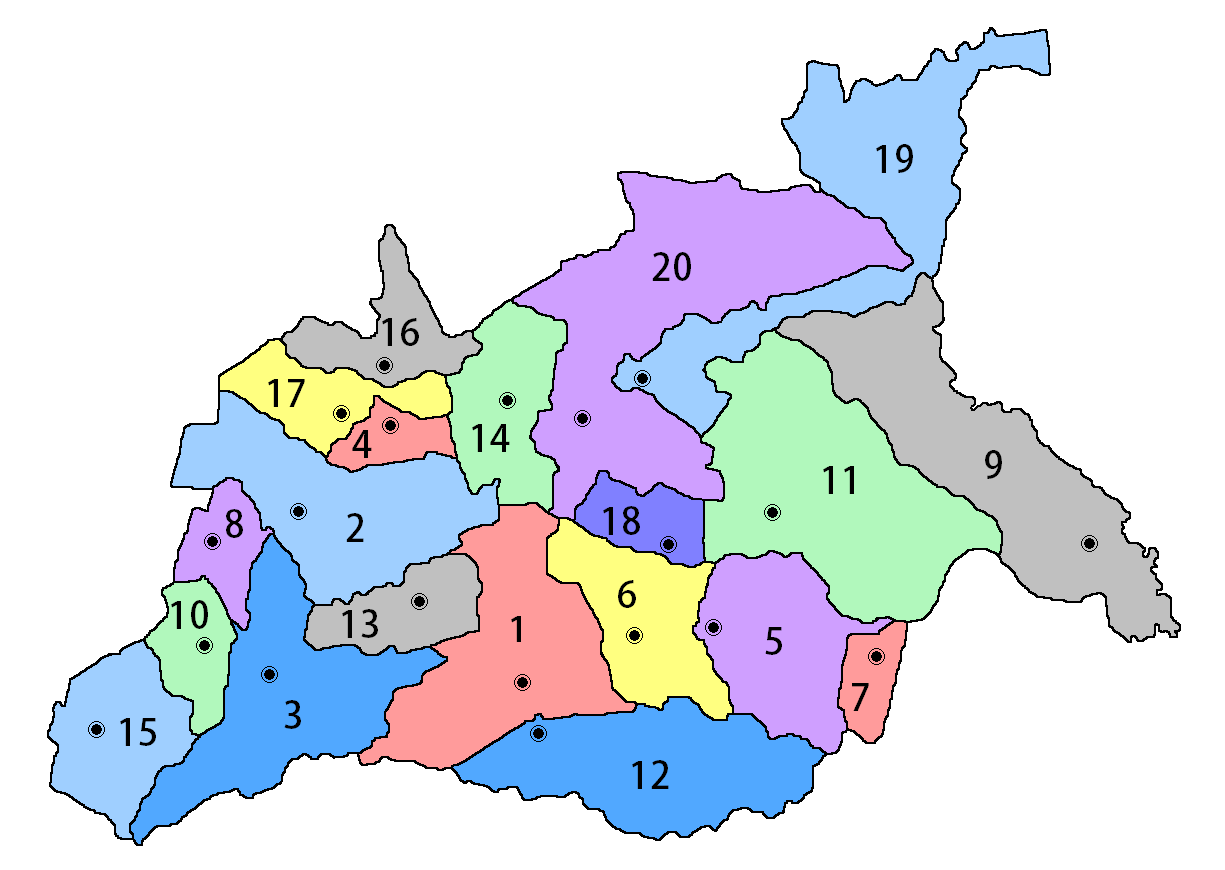

*The new district of Tembiaporá has not yet been added to the list and map since it was created recently.

== Climate ==
The average climate is mild with abundant rains. The temperature reaches 41 degrees Celsius in the summer and drops to 0 degrees C in the winter. It is one of the best areas for agriculture in the country.

== Orography and soil ==
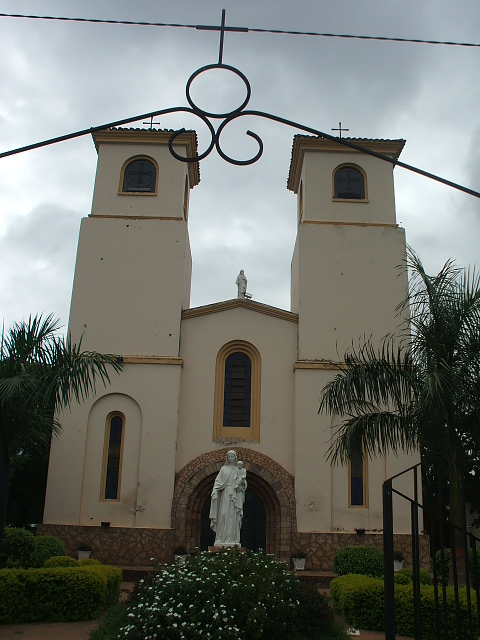
The Church of Coronel Oviedo

The Cordillera de Caaguazú extends throughout the department from north to south. It is made up of the mountain ranges of San Joaquín, in San Joaquín and Yhú; Tajao Paú and Carayaó; and Caaguazú, between Carayaó and Coronel Oviedo. Peak heights are no more than 200 meters, but to the east elevations reach 250 meters.

To the west there are formations of fluvial and glacial origins that date from the Carboniferous period (Paleozoic era), with sandstone soils. To the east, the soil is also of fluvial origin, lacustrine and marine, dating to the Permian period. In the mountain range, there is sandstone from the Triassic period which contains quartz.

The soils are sandstone and basalt in addition to mountains and meadows.

The territory is made up of a succession of valleys and elevated lands that range from the north to the south. In the north, there are valleys with ample fields apt for cattle; to the east, forests and natural herbal lands predominate.

The land is commonly used for agriculture.

== Hydrography ==
The most important bodies of water that cross the department are the Paraguay River, the Tebicuary-mi River, and the streams Tapiracuai, Mbutuy, Hondo and Tobatiry. Other local rivers include the Paraná River and the Acaray, Monday-mi, Yguazú, Capiibary and Guyraungua.

== Natural Environment and Vegetation ==
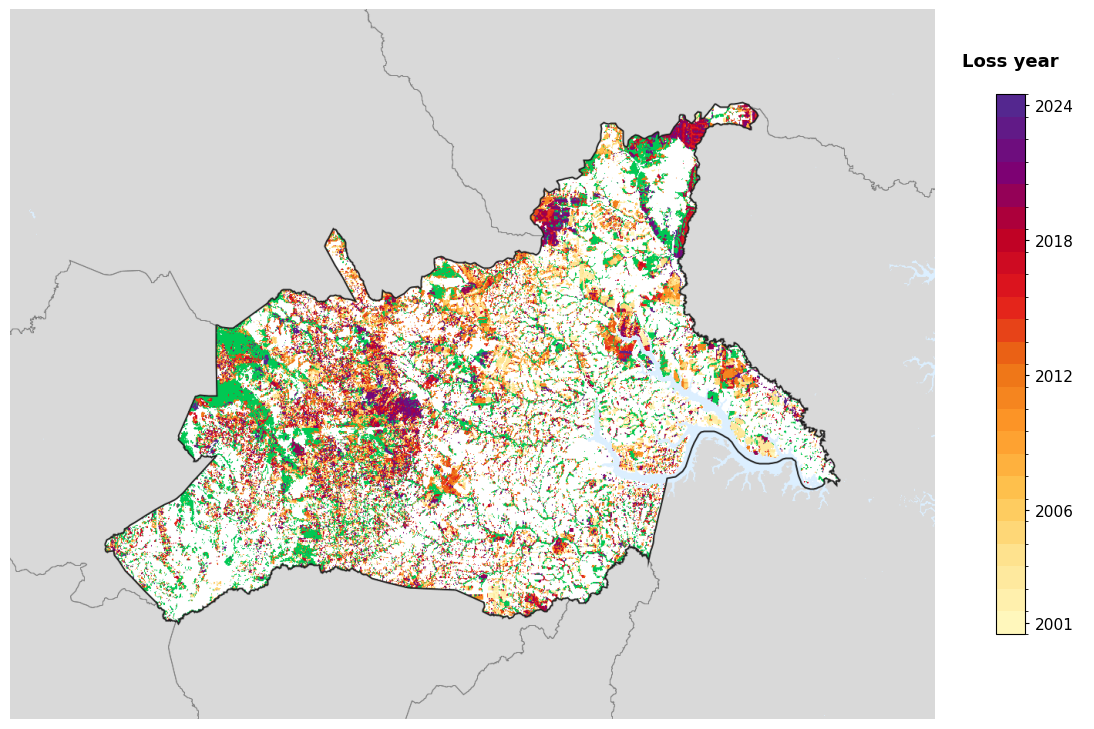
Tree-cover loss year in Caaguazú, 2001-2024, from the Global Forest Change dataset.

The Caaguazú department includes the Central Forest region, in the middle of the department, the Alto Paraná, in the east, and the Central Littoral, in the west.

The principal activity of the region is the harvesting of trees, which provides the raw material for the wood industry. Caaguzú is one of the areas that is most affected by deforestation in Paraguay. Some plant species in danger of extinction are the yvyra paje, nandyta, cedar and turnera aureli. Endangered animal species include the tirica, jaguareté, and arira’y.

== Economy ==
The department of Caaguazú is the number one national producer of manioc in the country and the second in cotton and sugar cane production. The population also practices cattle rearing and the farming of other fruits vegetables such as tomatoes, cucumbers, lettuce, strawberries, and citrus fruits. Caaguazú is the fourth greatest producer of maize.

The most important industries are cotton, oil, wood industry, and the manufacturing of furniture.

The central location of Caaguazú and the siting of Coronel Oviedo and the city of Caaguazú at crossroads makes the area an important commercial center.

== Communication and services ==
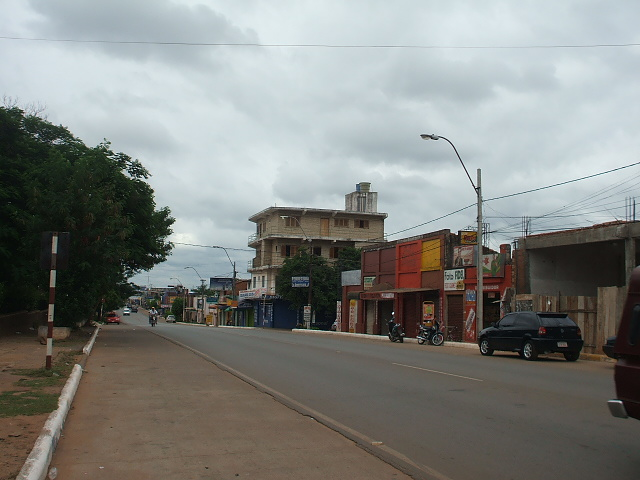
A street of Coronel Oviedo

National routes that serve Caaguazú are “Mcal. Estigarribia” (number 2) and “Dr. Gaspar Rodríguez de Francia” (number 7). They cross the entire department, connecting Asunción in the west with Ciudad del Este in the east.

The route “Gral. Aquino” (number 3) meets route “Bernardino Caballero” (number 5) in Coronel Oviedo, providing a connection to Concepción and Pedro Juan Caballero in the north of the country. The route “Dr. Blas Garay” (number 8) joins with route number 2 in Cnel. Oviedo and communicates with Villarrica and Caazapá.

There are a few runways for small airplanes in the department.

The department has phone service for more than 10,300 lines. AM radio stations include Radio Excélsior, Tajy, Coronel Oviedo, La Voz del Este, and FM radio stations include Seguritec Ingeniería S. A., Horizonte, Centenario, Lo Mita, Mensajero, Radio Clásica, América, Alborada, among others.

== Education ==
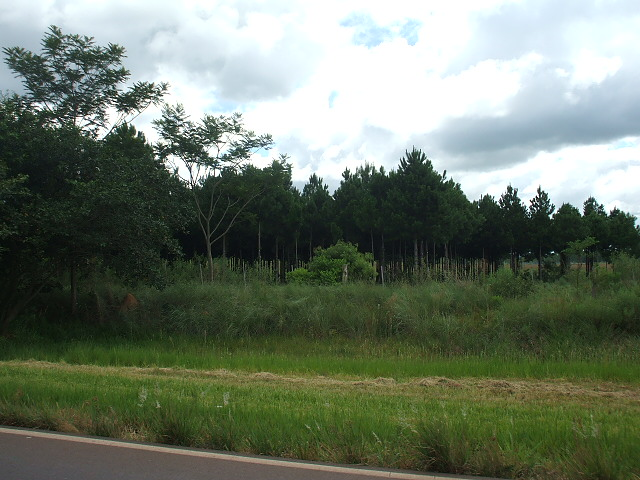
A land for reforestation in San José de los Arroyos

There are 589 institutions of elementary education, 913 basic schools, and 151 high schools (according to the Paraguayan educational system) in the department of Caaguazú.

== Health ==
There are 65 health establishments, including hospitals and other health care centers.

== Bibliography ==
- Geografía Ilustrada del Paraguay, Distribuidora Arami SRL; 2007. ISBN 99925-68-04-6
- Geografía del Paraguay, Primera Edición 1999, Editorial Hispana Paraguay SRL.
