= Doctor Juan Manuel Frutos =

Dr. Juan Manuel Frutos Doctor Juan Manuel Frutos
- Town
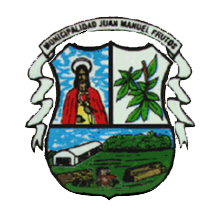
- Coat of arms

- Location within Paraguay
- Coordinates: 25°21′36″S 55°48′0″W
- Country: Paraguay
- Department: Caaguazú

Population (2022)
  - Total: 20,451

Doctor Juan Manuel Frutos is a town in the Caaguazú department of Paraguay.It is located 200 km. from Asunción on PY02.

The town was formerly called "Pastoreo" and is still commonly known by this name.

== Sources ==
- World Gazeteer: Paraguay – World-Gazetteer.com
