= San Joaquín District, Paraguay =

San Joaquín District
- district
- Location within Paraguay
- Coordinates: 25°1′0″S 56°1′0″W
- Country: Paraguay
- Department: Caaguazú Department

Area
  - Total: 466.8 km^{2} (180.2 sq mi)

Population (2022)
  - Total: 11,949
  - Density: 25.60/km^{2} (66.30/sq mi)

San Joaquín District is a district in Caaguazú Department, Paraguay. Santa Rosa del Mbutu (earlier Juan Ramón Chaves district) was carved out of the San Joaquin district by Law 617 on 9 November 1976. As per the 2022 census, it had a population of 11,949 inhabitants.

== History ==
San Joaquin was founded in 1747 by the Jesuit priests before their expulsion from the region by the Spanish Crown in 1767. Santa Rosa del Mbutu (earlier Juan Ramón Chaves district) was carved out of the San Joaquin district by Law 617 on 9 November 1976.

== Geography ==
San Joaquin is a district located in the Caaguazú Department in Paraguay. It occupies an area of 466.8 km^{2} (180.2 sq mi). It is located about 242 km (150 mi) from the Paraguayan capital of Asunción. It is located on the banks of the Tapirakuái River along the San Joaquín mountain range. The Cerro Morotí ('white hill') is a popular landmark, and its white color distinguishes it from the surrounding hills.

== Demographics ==
As per the 2022 census, San Joaquin district had a population of 11,949 inhabitants of which 6,254 were males and 5,695 were females. About 81.2% of the population was classified rural, and the rest (18.8%) lived in urban areas. About 29.5% of the population was below the age of fourteen, and 10.2% was more than 65 years of age. The population is ethno-diverse with a significant community of Brazilian immigrants.

== Economy ==
The economy of the district is mainly dependent on agriculture. Major agricultural produce include cotton, cassava, and maize. Cattle rearing is also prevalant in the region. The district also attracts tourists for historic and ecological tourism.

== Culture ==
There are several structures related to the Jesuits in the district. The Church of San Joaquin was built in 1746, and contains several paintings and statues. There is an old wooden cross erected on top of the Cerro Moroti. The patron saint festival is celebrated on 26 July annually and is dedicated to San Joaquin.
