= Coronel Oviedo =

- City
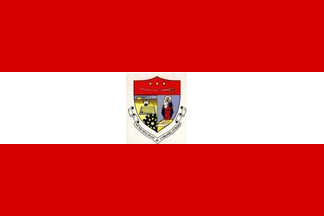
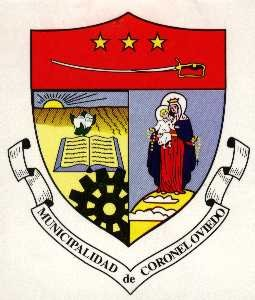
- Flag Coat of arms

- Location within Paraguay
- Coordinates: 25°27′S 56°27′W
- Country: Paraguay
- Department: Caaguazú

Population (2006)
  - Total: 52,400

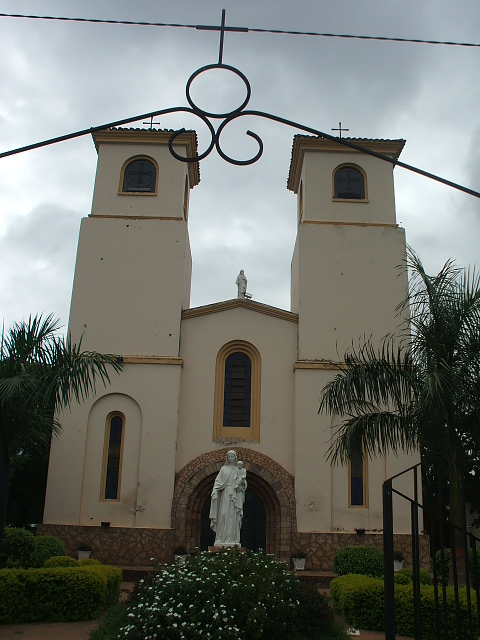
The Church of Coronel Oviedo

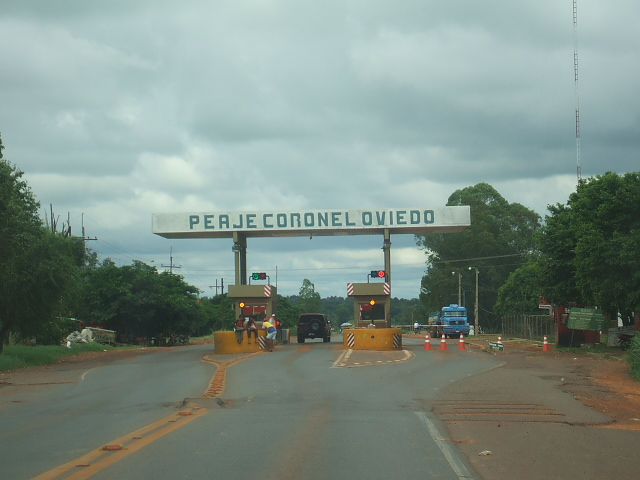
The toll of Coronel Oviedo, a few meters away from the entrance to Nueva Londres

Coronel Oviedo (Spanish pronunciation: [koɾoˈnel oˈβjeðo]), locally known as Oviedo, is a city in east-central Paraguay. It is the capital of the Caaguazú Department, about 150 kilometers east of Asunción, and was founded in 1758.

The city has a population of about 52,400 (2006 Estimate) and is the hometown of former president Nicanor Duarte Frutos. Coronel Oviedo is an important transit point, as it lies halfway between Asunción and Ciudad del Este. In addition, it sits at the intersection of highways Ruta 2, Ruta 7 and Ruta 8.

The moniker for the city is the "Capital of Work" or capital de trabajo in Spanish.

The original name of the city at the time of its founding was "Nuestra Señora del Rosario de Ajos" or "Our Lady of the Rosary of Garlic", as the cultivation of garlic was a prominent local cash crop and formed a significant base for trade in the city. In 1931, the government of Paraguay changed the name of the city to Coronel Oviedo in memory of Cnel Florentin Oviedo, hero of the War of the Triple Alliance. After the war, Oviedo settled in Ajos and lived there until his death in 1935.

The city is the seat of the Roman Catholic Diocese of Coronel Oviedo.

== Climate ==
Coronel Oviedo has a humid subtropical climate (Köppen: Cfa) with hot summers and warm winters.

Climate data for Coronel Oviedo (Salesian Agricultural Institute "Carlos Pfannl") (1991–2020)
Month	Jan	Feb	Mar	Apr	May	Jun	Jul	Aug	Sep	Oct	Nov	Dec	Year
Record high °C (°F)	41.5 (106.7)	39.5 (103.1)	40.2 (104.4)	37.3 (99.1)	36.0 (96.8)	32.5 (90.5)	32.0 (89.6)	37.5 (99.5)	39.6 (103.3)	40.4 (104.7)	40.4 (104.7)	39.5 (103.1)	41.5 (106.7)
Mean daily maximum °C (°F)	33.0 (91.4)	32.4 (90.3)	31.5 (88.7)	28.9 (84.0)	24.8 (76.6)	23.6 (74.5)	23.6 (74.5)	26.2 (79.2)	27.4 (81.3)	29.5 (85.1)	30.6 (87.1)	32.2 (90.0)	28.6 (83.5)
Daily mean °C (°F)	26.5 (79.7)	25.8 (78.4)	24.8 (76.6)	22.1 (71.8)	18.5 (65.3)	17.4 (63.3)	16.6 (61.9)	18.6 (65.5)	20.3 (68.5)	23.1 (73.6)	24.1 (75.4)	25.9 (78.6)	22.0 (71.6)
Mean daily minimum °C (°F)	21.4 (70.5)	21.1 (70.0)	19.9 (67.8)	17.5 (63.5)	14.1 (57.4)	13.0 (55.4)	11.7 (53.1)	13.2 (55.8)	15.1 (59.2)	18.1 (64.6)	18.7 (65.7)	20.6 (69.1)	17.0 (62.6)
Record low °C (°F)	12.6 (54.7)	9.9 (49.8)	7.2 (45.0)	5.6 (42.1)	1.0 (33.8)	−0.6 (30.9)	−1.6 (29.1)	−1.4 (29.5)	1.4 (34.5)	8.5 (47.3)	6.8 (44.2)	9.8 (49.6)	−1.6 (29.1)
Average precipitation mm (inches)	155.5 (6.12)	169.1 (6.66)	153.5 (6.04)	162.6 (6.40)	173.6 (6.83)	117.0 (4.61)	73.2 (2.88)	64.8 (2.55)	118.1 (4.65)	211.0 (8.31)	205.9 (8.11)	183.3 (7.22)	1,787.6 (70.38)
Average relative humidity (%)	70.0	72.6	73.9	76.3	78.1	78.6	73.8	71.7	69.8	69.4	68.5	68.4	72.6
Source 1: NOAA
Source 2: Weatherbase (humidity)

== See also ==
- List of cities in Paraguay
- Departments of Paraguay
- Caaguazú Department
