= José Domingo Ocampos =

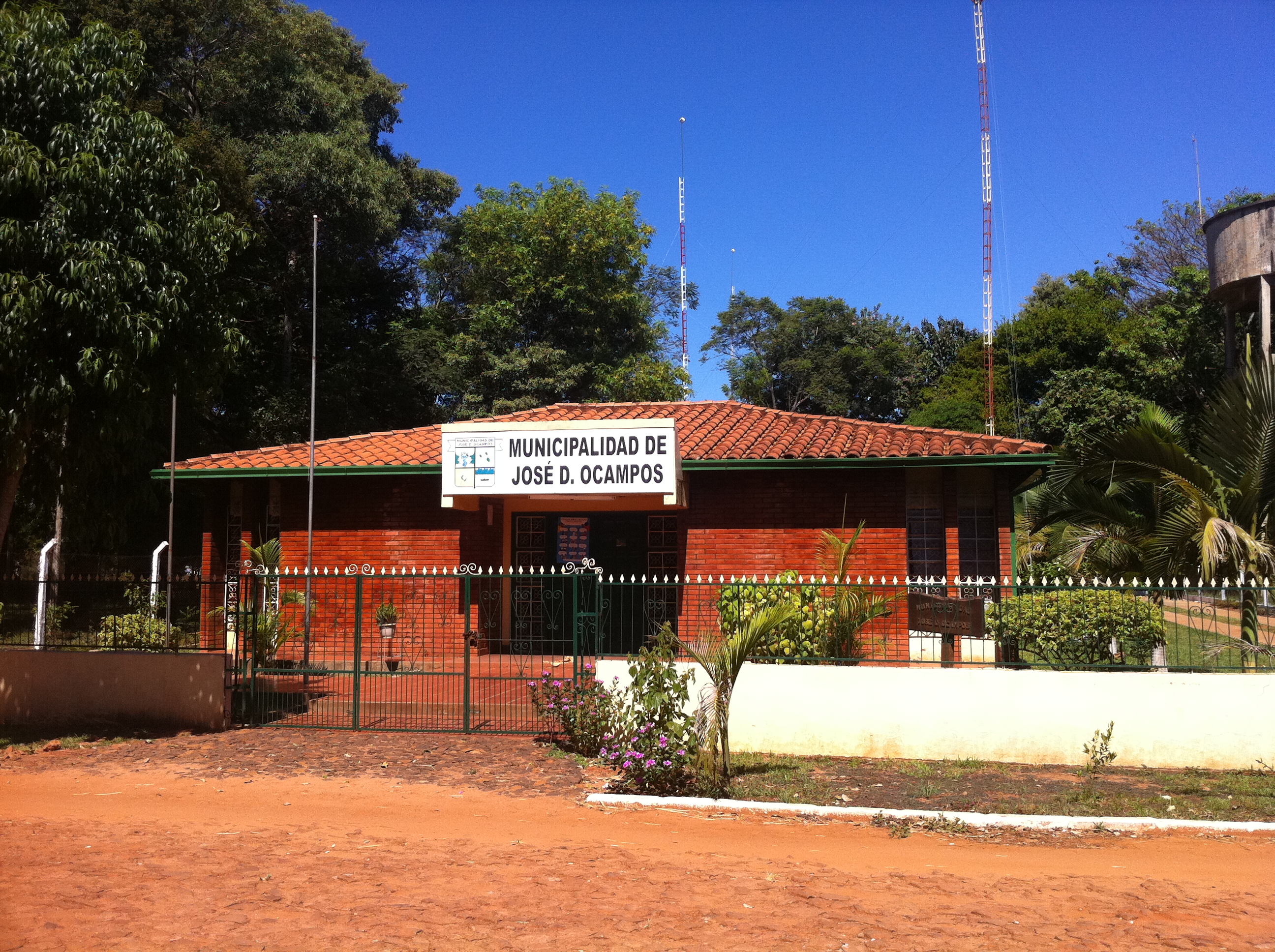
- Townhall of José Domingos Ocampos

- Location within Paraguay
- Coordinates: 25°24′0″S 55°26′24″W
- Country: Paraguay
- Department: Caaguazú

Population (2008)
  - Total: 1 918

José Domingo Ocampos is a town in the Caaguazú department of Paraguay.

== Sources ==
- World Gazeteer: Paraguay – World-Gazetteer.com
