= Yguazú District =

Municipality in Paraguay

Yguazú District Distrito de Yguazú (Spanish) Táva Yguasu (Guarani)
- District
- Location within Paraguay
- Coordinates: 25°28′0″S 55°0′0″W
- Country: Paraguay
- Department: Alto Paraná Department
- Founded: 22 August 1961

Government
  - Intendente Municipal: Mauro Kawano (ANR)
- Elevation: 258 m (846 ft)

Population (2008)
  - Total: 12,277
- Time zone: UTC−03:00
- Postal code: 7510
- Area code: (595) (632)
- Climate: Cfa

Yguazú (Spanish: [iɣwaˈsu]; Guarani: Yguasu [ɨɣʷaˈsu], after Iguazu River, lit. 'Big Water'), historically known as Colonia Yguazú, is a municipality and district of Paraguay's Alto Paraná Department, founded by Japanese immigrants.

Yguazú was founded on 22 August, 1961, as a Japanese agricultural colony, and is located 40 kilometers to the West of Ciudad del Este.

== Weather ==
The average temperature is 21 °C, the maximum 38 °C and minimum 0 °C.

== Demographics ==
As of 2008, there were 6,493 men and 5,784 women out of 12,277 persons.
