= Doctor Juan Eulogio Estigarribia =

- Location within Paraguay
- Coordinates: 25°22′12″S 55°42′0″W
- Country: Paraguay
- Department: Caaguazú

Population (2008)
  - Total: 14 316

Doctor Juan Eulogio Estigarribia, also known as Campo Nueve or Campo 9, is a city in Paraguay. It is famous for its tourism and for its sports which include a local football team, and for its Guarani culture sites. The main river in the city is the Iguazú River and the city is agricultural.

The town grew up after German-Canadian Mennonites founded the neighbouring Sommerfeld Colony in the late 1940s, and it became a district in 1981.

== Sources ==
- World Gazeteer: Paraguay – World-Gazetteer.com
