= Minga Guazú =

Minga Guazú Mínga Guasu (Guarani)
- City and district
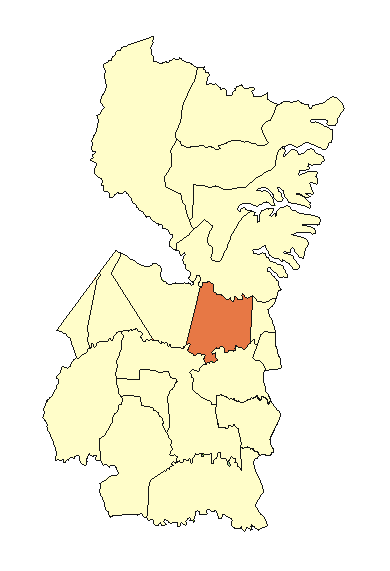
- Coordinates: 25°22′S 54°45′W
- Country: Paraguay
- Department: Alto Paraná
- Foundation: May 14, 1958

Government
  - Intendente Municipal: Alcides Romero Roa

Area
  - Total: 548 km^{2} (212 sq mi)
- Elevation: 241 m (791 ft)

Population (2008)
  - Total: 60,719
  - Density: 110.8/km^{2} (287/sq mi)
- Time zone: -4 Gmt
- Postal code: 7420
- Area code: (595) (644)
- Climate: Cfa

Minga Guazú (Guarani: Mínga Guasu) is a city and district of the Alto Paraná Department, Paraguay. It is part of the Gran Ciudad del Este. It was formerly known as Colonia Presidente Stroessner, but was changed after the fall of the dictator Alfredo Stroessner. Minga Guazú was established in 1958 and is located in the Department of Alto Paraná, 20 km. west of the department capital, Ciudad del Este. The Guaraní International Airport is located in the city.

== The name ==
Its name derives from the Quechua word "minga", which means "cooperative work for improvement" and the Guaraní word "guasu", meaning big. These two words together mean Big Work in Community, more or less.

== History ==
Minga Guazú was founded and grew due to labor of the Salesians of Don Bosco, led by the priest Guido Coronel, the founder of the town. In the mid-1960s, Coronel decided to build a city 20 kilometers away from the border with Brazil. The center of the city, however, is located 16 kilometers away; the development at 20 kilometers is second in population.

== Weather ==
The average annual temperature is 21 °C, the highest reaches 38 °C and the minimum 0 °C. The highest annual amount of the country in rainfall occurs in the region of Alto Paraná.

== Demography ==
Of the 60,719 inhabitants, 31,358 were males and 29,361 females, according to estimates by the Directorate General of Statistics, Census and Surveys.

== Economy ==
Much of the economic activity of the city is based on the Cooperative that include its inhabitants, now converted into a real agro-industrial complex.

Its main product is soybeans, in addition to maize, cassava, cotton, wheat, mate, sugarcane, poultry, vegetables and beans.

The biggest oil industry of Paraguay is in Minga Guazú, the multinational "Cargill".

== Tourism ==
The Guarani Airport is located in the city of Minga Guazú, one of the most modern airports in South America, located 4 km from Route VII "Dr. Gaspar Rodriguez de Francia" and 30 km from Ciudad del Este.

The Minga Guazú Expo is conducted annually in September and the Patronal party is celebrated on May 24, the day of Mary Help of Christians. On July 6 is celebrated the "Day of Minguero."

It has two major urban centres in the Km 20 and Km 16. In the first, in 1966 was built a school and a church dedicated to the patron saint of Agro, "Maria Auxiliadora". Years later was established the Cooperative Minga Guazú, which enabled the villagers to a more dignified life and better working conditions.

In another center, are key public institutions and the Don Bosco College.

In the area the rivers are Monday, Acaray, the stream Acaray-mi and Santa Maria.

== How to get there ==
The city has easy access to Route VII and good connection with Encarnacion via Route VI.

Guaraní International Airport, located in the west side of the district, offers regular flights to Asunción, São Paulo, and connections with other flights.

== Facilities ==
- Known as the "Industrial Capital" of Paraguay, this town hosts the greatest Cooperative Association in Latin America, also the biggest part of oil industry of Paraguay: a branch plant of the multinational Cargill.
- The district is also the home of the Guaraní International Airport, the second biggest airport of the country after the Silvio Pettirossi International Airport in Luque (suburb of the capital Asunción).
- The Germanic Association of Alto Paraná has its head office in Minga Guazú, probably due to the German immigrants who work in the agricultural sector.
- The Taiwanese government invested in the city, promoting the installation of Parque Industrial Oriente.
