= Miss Grand Paraguay 2023 =

6th Miss Grand Paraguay competition, beauty pageant edition

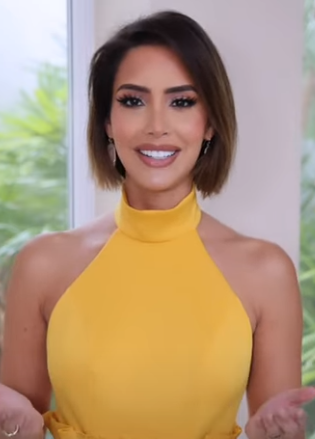
- Maelia Salcines, one of the contest's winners
- Date: April 2, 2023
- Presenters: Lucía Sapena; Fabián Benítez; Solange Mendez Flores
- Entertainment: Luigi Manzoni; Lia Love
- Venue: Paseo Events Center, Asunción
- Broadcaster: Unicanal
- Entrants: 24
- Placements: 15
- Debuts: Capitán Bado; General Elizardo Aquino; Ñemby; San Antonio; Paraguayan Communities in the United States
- Withdrawals: Itapúa; Paraguari; Pedro Juan Caballero; Presidente Franco; San Pedro de Ycuamandiyú; Santa Ana
- Returns: Amambay; Areguá; Capiatá; Itauguá; Limpio; Mariano Roque Alonso; Nueva Italia; Villarrica
- Winner: Maelia Salcines (Paraguayan Community in USA)
- Congeniality: Fabiola Martínez (Villarrica)
- Photogenic: Tirsa Cantero (Areguá)

External videos
- Miss Grand Paraguay 2023 Grand Final Competition, on April 2, 2023, YouTube video

Miss Grand Paraguay 2023 was the 6th edition of the Miss Grand Paraguay pageant, held on April 2, 2023, at the Paseo Events Center, Asunción. Candidates chosen through either the regional pageants or national preliminary casting competed for the title. Maelia Salcines of the Paraguayan Community in USA was crowned by Miss Grand Paraguay 2022, Agatha Leon of Ciudad del Este, and gained the right to represent the country at Miss Grand International 2023, to be held in Vietnam on October 25. On the other hand, Sharon Capó of Amambay was crowned Miss Grand Paraguay 2024, and will eventually represent the country at the 2024 international edition.

Additionally, Fabiola Martínez of Villarrica was crowned Miss Supranational Paraguay 2023 and has earned the right to represent Paraguay at Miss Supranational 2023, to be held in Poland on July 14.

The grand final competition of the pageant was hosted by Lucía Sapena, Fabián Benítez, and Solange Mendez Flores, and was live-transmitted to the audience nationwide via Unicanal.

== Background ==
=== Date and venue ===
After the end of the Miss Grand Paraguay 2022 contest in May 2022, the pageant organizer, MGM Productions, consequently announced to accept of the department licensees responsible to held a regional contest to elect the representative and also ran the first central casting on 17 September, to select the national finalists for the 2023 edition of the contest, each of finalists qualified through the casting was later assigned to represent one of the country's administrative divisions.

The following is a list of the main events in the Miss Grand Paraguay 2023 pageant.

Location	Date	Event	Venue	Ref.
Preliminary Host: San Pedro	March 28	Miss Sport Challenge	Hotel Cristal, Santa Rosa del Aguaray	
Preliminary Host: San Pedro	March 28	Swimsuit contest	Rancho gregoria, Santa Rosa del Aguaray	
Final Venue: Asunción	March 31	Preliminary competition	Paseo Events Center, Asunción	
Final Venue: Asunción	April 2	Grand Final Coronation	Paseo Events Center, Asunción	

=== Selection of contestants ===
National finalists for the Miss Grand Paraguay 2023 pageant were either; (1) selected by local organizers entitled by the national committee to elect their regional candidates, or (2) directly chosen by the national organizer through the casting events, then each qualified candidate was later assigned to represent one of the country's administrative divisions.

The following is a list of local preliminary contests for the Miss Grand Paraguay 2023 beauty pageant.

List of Miss Grand Paraguay 2023 regional pageants, by the coronation date
Host Department	Pageant	Date & Venue	Entrants	Title	Ref.
Central	Miss San Lorenzo	4 August 2022 at San Lorenzo Shopping, San Lorenzo	9	Miss Grand San Lorenzo	
Central	Miss Grand Luque	20 December 2022 at Hotel Excelsior, Asunción	17	Miss Grand Luque	
Canindeyú	Miss Grand Canindeyú	25 June 2022 at Hotel Katueté, Katueté	8	Miss Grand Canindeyú	
Alto Paraná	Señorita Minga Guazú	25 September 2022 at Km 16 Minga Guazú Itau Supermarket, Minga Guazú	5^{[α]}	Miss Grand Minga Guazú	
Asunción	Miss Grand Asunción	1 November 2022 at Hotel Excelsior, Catedral, Asunción	13	Miss Grand Asunción	
Note: 1. ^α Only for the Señorita category, age 17 – 28

== Results summary ==
=== Main placements ===
Miss Grand Paraguay 2023 competition result by department
Color keys:

Winner 2nd place 3rd place 4th place 5th place	Top 15 Unplaced Did not compete Won at least 1 supplementary title

Position	Delegate
Miss Grand Paraguay 2023	(United States) Paraguayan Community in USA – Maelia Salcines
Miss Grand Paraguay 2024	Amambay – Sharon Capó
Virreina	San Lorenzo – Sol Pérez
1st runner-up	Asunción – Thiara Zorrilla
2nd runner-up	Luque – Sindy Riquelme
3rd runner-up	Fernando de la Mora – Tamara Vera
Top 15	Areguá – Tirsa Cantero; Capiatá – Laura Carmona; Central – Valeria Giagni; General Elizardo Aquino – Melina Marecos; Limpio – Chabely Zoilan; Mariano Roque Alonso – Guadalupe Pereira; Minga Guazú – Alma Garcete; Nueva Italia 1 – Abigail Gómez; Nueva Italia 2 – Sofía Ayala; Villarrica – Fabiola Martínez

=== Supplementary titles ===
Position	Delegate
Miss Supranational Paraguay 2023	Villarrica – Fabiola Martínez
1st runner-up	Mariano Roque Alonso – Guadalupe Pereira
2nd runner-up	Central – Valeria Giagni

Position	Delegate
Miss Petite Paraguay 2023	Nueva Italia – Abigail Gómez
Runner-up	General Elizardo Aquino – Melina Marecos

=== Special awards ===
Award	Winner
Miss Sports	Villarrica – Fabiola Martínez
Miss Top Model	Canindeyú – Yanina Pereira
Miss Social Media	Villarrica – Fabiola Martínez
Miss Photogenic	Areguá – Tirsa Cantero
Miss Congeniality	Villarrica – Fabiola Martínez
Miss Beautiful Girl	Fernando de la Mora – Tamara Vera
Best Face	Capitán Bado – Meilin Chang Franco
Best Shape	Asunción – Thiara Zorrilla
Best Smile	San Lorenzo – Sol Pérez
Best Video Presentation	Villarrica – Fabiola Martínez
Best Evening Gown	(United States) Paraguayan Community in USA – Maelia Salcines
Truss Hair Girl	Amambay – Sharon Capó

== Contestants ==
As of February 2023, 25 delegates have been confirmed to participate.

Department/District/City	Contestant	Age	Height	Ref.
Amambay	Sharon Capó Nara	23	1.73 m (5 ft 8 in)	
Areguá (CE)	Tirsa Cantero	25	1.69 m (5 ft 6 1/2 in)	
Asunción	Thiara Zorrilla	21	1.71 m (5 ft 7 1/2 in)	
Canindeyú	Yanina Pereira	20	1.75 m (5 ft 9 in)	
Capiatá (CE)	Laura Carmona	23	1.75 m (5 ft 9 in)	
Capitán Bado (AM)	Meilin Chang Franco	20	1.68 m (5 ft 6 in)	
Ciudad del Este (AA)	Jazmin Castillo	18	1.65 m (5 ft 5 in)	
Central	Valeria Giagni	19	1.76 m (5 ft 9 1/2 in)	
Concepción	Luisa Villalba	25	1.73 m (5 ft 8 in)	
Fernando de la Mora (CE)	Tamara Vera	22	1.72 m (5 ft 7 1/2 in)	
General Elizardo Aquino (SP)	Melina Marecos			
Itauguá (CE)	Yesenia Quiñónez	22	1.69 m (5 ft 6 1/2 in)	
Limpio (CE)	Chabely Zoilan	27	1.72 m (5 ft 7 1/2 in)	
Luque (CE)	Sindy Riquelme	21	1.70 m (5 ft 7 in)	
Mariano Roque Alonso (CE)	Guadalupe Pereira	23	1.71 m (5 ft 7 1/2 in)	
Minga Guazú (AA)	Alma Garcete	25		
Ñemby (CE)	Andrea Estigarribia	22	1.72 m (5 ft 7 1/2 in)	
Nueva Italia (CE)	Sofía Ayala	25	1.70 m (5 ft 7 in)	
Nueva Italia (CE)	Abigail Gómez	23	1.62 m (5 ft 4 in)	
(United States) Paraguayan Community in USA	Maelia Salcines	28	1.66 m (5 ft 5 1/2 in)	
San Antonio (CE)	Shyrley Ortiz	25	1.65 m (5 ft 5 in)	
San Lorenzo (CE)	María Sol Pérez	23	1.75 m (5 ft 9 in)	
San Pedro	Evelin Baruja	25	1.74 m (5 ft 8 1/2 in)	
Villarrica (GU)	Fabiola Martínez	28	1.64 m (5 ft 4 1/2 in)	
Villeta (CE)	Belén Amarilla	22	1.65 m (5 ft 5 in)	
