= Miss Grand Paraguay =

Beauty contest in Paraguay

- Established: 2016; 10 years ago
- Founder: Gabriel Roman
- Type: Beauty pageant
- Headquarters: Asunción
- Location: Paraguay
- Official language: Spanish
- Owner: Mygami Producciones SRL. (2016 – Present)
- President: Gabriel Roman
- Parent organization: Concurso Nacional de Belleza del Paraguay (2024 – Present)
- Affiliations: Miss Grand International

Miss Grand Paraguay
licensees timeline

Stand-alone pageant
Appointed titleholder
No licensee/titleholder
Under another pageant

Miss Grand Paraguay is an annual female beauty pageant based in Asunción of Paraguay, founded in 2017 by Gabriel Roman of MGM Productions, aiming to select the country representatives to compete in various international pageants including its parent pageant, Miss Grand International, in which Paraguay won the main title once in 2018, by Clara Sosa of Asunción, and was placed among the Top 20/22 semifinalists five times in 2017, 2019, 2022, 2024, and 2025 by Lía Ashmore, Milena Rodríguez, Agatha León, Sharon Capó and Cecilia Romero, respectively.

In 2025, the Miss Grand Paraguay title was under an umbrella project, CNB Paraguay, founded in 2024, also by Mygami Producciones, where the country representatives for several international pageants, including Miss Grand International, Miss Supranational, Miss Cosmo, and Miss Teen Mundial, were determined.

== History ==
Paraguay made its debutant at Miss Grand International in 2013, with the representation of a Asunción-based fashion model Sendy Cáceres, followed by Giselle Sotomayor in 2014, but both of them finished as non-placement. After the country had no licensee in 2015, Gabriel Roman of MGM Productions, the Asunción organizer company, acquired the franchise in the following year, and subsequently appointed Cindy Nordmann Arias to represent the country at Miss Grand International 2016, held in Las Vegas of the United States, unfortunately, also went unplaced.

Under the management of MGM Productions, the first contest of Miss Grand Paraguay finally happened in 2017, featuring 16 national finalists who were selected by various local licensees as well as the national organizer. Its final coronation event was broadcast on La Tele, in which Lía Duarte Ashmore of Guairá won the main title, she was also placed among the top 20 finalists after participating in the 5th edition of Miss Grand International in Vietnam. Since then, the pageant has been held annually to determine the country representatives for such an international contest.

The pageant, originally scheduled to be held on 15 March, was canceled for the first time in 2020, resulting from the spike of SARS-CoV-2 Delta variant positive cases in Paraguay. The organizer decided to appoint Daisy Lezcano of Isla Pucú, one of the pageant candidates, to participate at the international stage. Meanwhile, the remainder of delegates goes to compete in the 2021 edition instead.

In 2022, Kendal Hirschfeld, also known as La Comadre on social media, became the first openly transgender to compete for the Miss Grand Paraguay title.

== Editions ==
=== Location and date ===
The following list is the edition detail of the Miss Grand Paraguay contest, since its inception in 2017.

Edition	Date	Final venue	Entrants	Ref.
1st	29 Jul 2017	Agustin Pio Barrios Theater, Japanese Paraguayan Center, Asunción	16	
2nd	9 Jun 2018	Theater of the Americas, Paraguayan-American Cultural Center (CCPA), Asunción	15	
3rd	29 Jul 2019	Marshal Convention Center, Asunción	16	
The 2020 pageant was cancelled due to the COVID-19 pandemic, the titleholder was instead appointed.
4th	3 Jul 2021	Hotel Guaraní, Asunción	22	
5th	7 May 2022	Hotel Guaraní, Asunción	17	
6th	2 Apr 2023	Paseo Events Center, Asunción	25	
No national pageant in 2024, the 2024 titleholder was determined through the 2023 national pageant.
7th	30 Mar 2025	Salon de Eventos del Paseo La Galería, Asunción	23	
8th	3 May 2026	Teatro Mangoré, Ciudad del Este	15	

=== Competition result ===
Edition	Winner	Vice queen				Ref.
Edition	Winner	2nd place	3rd place	4th place	5th place	Ref.
1st	Lía Ashmore (Guairá)	Nathalia Méndez (Alto Paraná)	Alejandra Amarilla (Asunción)	Yenifer Sauer (Itapúa)	Jessica Acosta (Cordillera)	
2nd	Clara Sosa (Asunción)	Irene Camacho (Paraguarí)	Vanessa Ramirez (Areguá)	Tamara Carvallo (Ciudad del Este)	Bianca Antonelli (Presidente Franco)	
3rd	Milena Rodríguez (Itapúa)	Luján Mendoza (Nueva Italia)	Clara Berni (Mariano Roque Alonso)	Venus Calvo (Caaguazú)	Silvana Duarte (Ciudad del Este)	
4th	Jimena Sosa (Colonias Unidas)	Lorena Rodríguez (Presidente Franco)	Liz Valdovinos (San Pedro)	Elicena Andrada (PAR com. in Spain)	Angélica Testa (Concepción)	
5th	Agatha Leon (Ciudad del Este)	Nayeli Portillo (Asunción)	Ailin Adorno (Fernando de la Mora)	Milenha Montania (Luque)	Lorena Román (Minga Guazú)	
6th	Maelia Salcines (PAR. Com. in USA)	Sol Pérez (San Lorenzo)	Thiara Zorrilla (Asunción)	Sindy Riquelme (Luque)	Tamara Vera (Fernando de la Mora)	
6th	Sharon Capó Nara (Note: As Miss Grand Paraguay 2024) (Amambay)	Sol Pérez (San Lorenzo)	Thiara Zorrilla (Asunción)	Sindy Riquelme (Luque)	Tamara Vera (Fernando de la Mora)	
7th	Cecilia Romero (Caazapá)	Bárbara Vázquez (Ciudad del Este)	Gabriela Arrellaga (Presidente Franco)	Rocio Cortesi (Fulgencio Yegros)	Eliana Penayo Ovelar (Villarrica)	
8th	Micaela Viveros (Amambay)	Khaterine Masi (San Lorenzo)	Belén Pereira (Itapúa)	Deuza Silveira (Caazapá)	Bianca Selena Ortiz (Presidente Franco)	

== International competition ==
The following is a list of Paraguay representatives at the Miss Grand International contest.

Color keys

- : Declared as the winner
- : Ended as a runner-up (Top 5)
- : Ended as a finalist (Top 10)
- : Ended as a semifinalist (Top 20/21)
- : Ended as special awards winner

Year	Miss Grand Paraguay	Title (Note: Title directly obtained from any national pageant, not the appointed title.)	Placement	Special Awards	National Director
2026	Micaela Viveros	Miss Grand Paraguay 2026	Top 25		Gabriel Roman
2025	Cecilia Romero	Miss Grand Paraguay 2025	Top 22		Gabriel Roman
2024	Sharon Capó Nara	Miss Grand Paraguay 2024	Top 20		Gabriel Roman
2023	Maelia Salcines	Miss Grand Paraguay 2023	Unplaced		Gabriel Roman
2022	Agatha Leon	Miss Grand Paraguay 2022	Top 20		Gabriel Roman
2021	Jimena Sosa	Miss Grand Paraguay 2021	Unplaced		Gabriel Roman
2020	Daisy Lezcano	Finalist Miss Grand Paraguay 2020	Unplaced		Gabriel Roman
2019	Milena Rodríguez	Miss Grand Paraguay 2019	Top 20		Gabriel Roman
2018	Clara Sosa	Miss Grand Paraguay 2018	Winner		Gabriel Roman
2017	Lía Duarte Ashmore	Miss Grand Paraguay 2017	Top 20		Gabriel Roman
2016	Cindy Nordmann Arias	Appointed	Unplaced		Gabriel Roman
2015	Did not compete				
2014	Gissella Sotomayor	Appointed	Unplaced		Salvador Mass and Isabel Mussi
2013	Sendy Marisol Cáceres	Appointed	Unplaced		Salvador Mass and Isabel Mussi

== Winner gallery ==
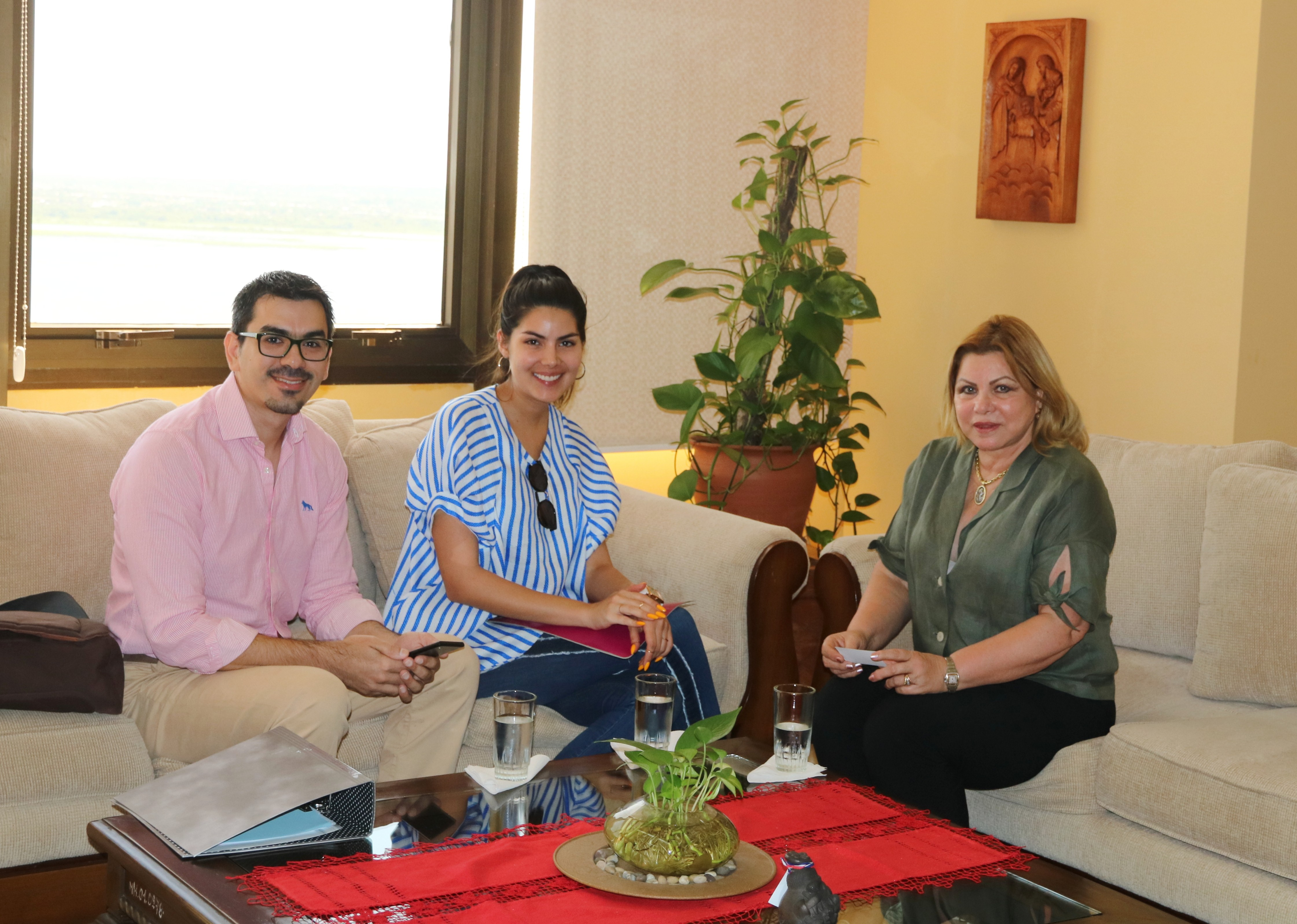
Directors of Miss Grand Paraguay, Myrian Arévalos and Gabriel Román, visit Nilda Romero, the Minister of Ministry of Women discuss the possibility of collaborating on women's right-related projects.

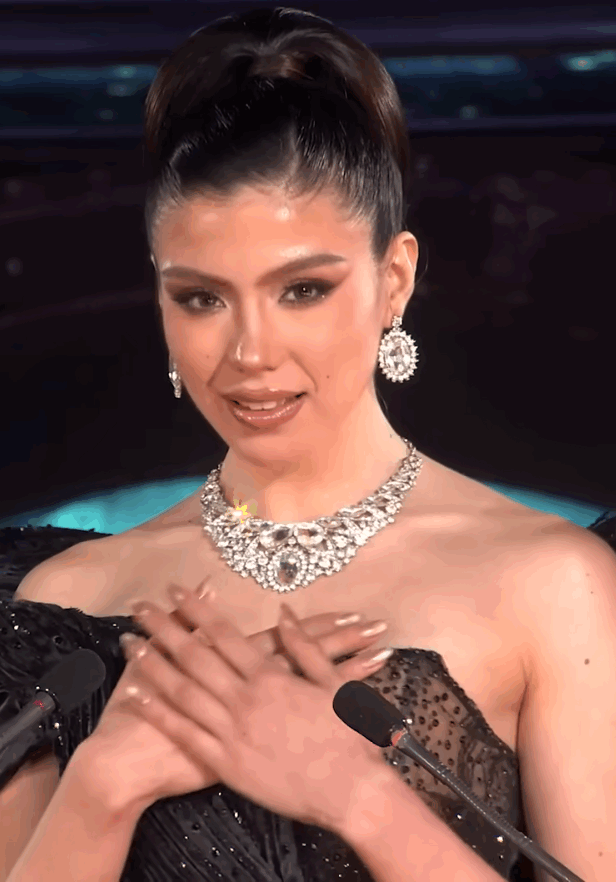
Miss Grand Paraguay 2025
Cecilia Romero
(Caazapá)

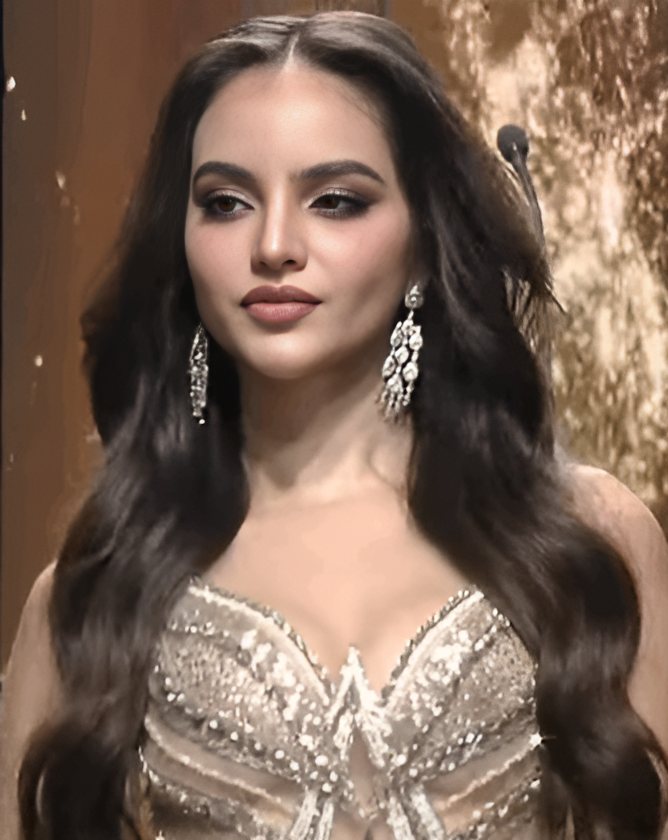
Miss Grand Paraguay 2024
Sharon Capó
(Amambay)

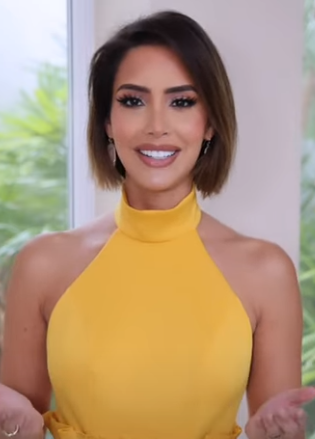
Miss Grand Paraguay 2023
Maelia Salcines
(PAR. Com. in USA)

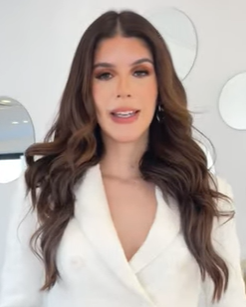
Miss Grand Paraguay 2022
Agatha Leon
(Ciudad del Este)

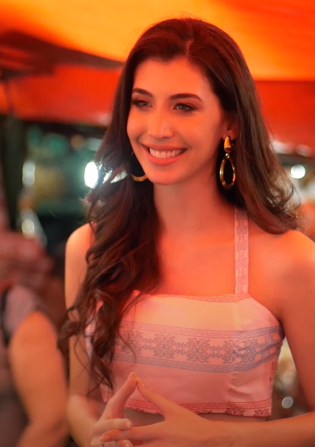
Miss Grand Paraguay 2021
Jimena Sosa
(Colonias Unidas)

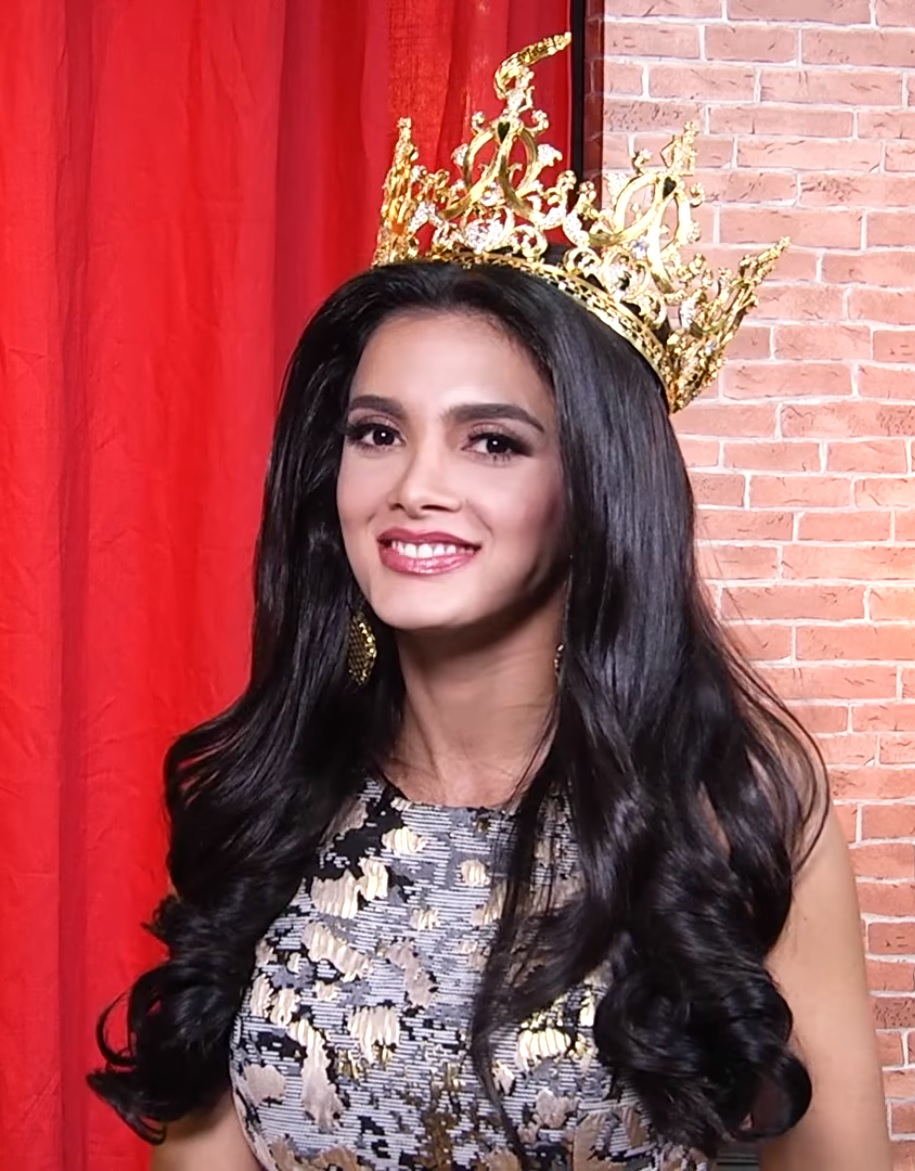
Miss Grand Paraguay 2018
Clara Sosa
(Asunción)

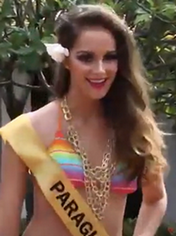
Miss Grand Paraguay 2014
Gissella Sotomayor
(Itapúa)

== Participating national finalists ==
The following list is the national finalists of the Miss Grand Paraguay pageant, as well as the competition results.

Represented	1st	2nd	3rd	4th	5th	6th	7th
Department
Alto Paraguay							
Alto Paraná							15
Amambay			Y			(Note: The winner Miss Grand Paraguay 2023 represent Paraguay in Miss Grand International 2024)	
Asunción			10	11	V		V (Note: Virreina from Petite category)
Asunción			10	11	V		Y
Asunción			10	11	V		Y
Boquerón							
Caaguazú	10						
Caazapá	10	Y			Y		
Canindeyú	Y	Y		11	10	Y	
Central					10	15	C
Concepción	Y	10			10	Y	G
Cordillera		Y					
Guairá							
Itapúa		10			10		
Misiones	Y	10					
Ñeembucú							
Paraguarí	10			Y	Y		
Presidente Hayes							
San Pedro	Y	Y	10		Y	Y	Y
San Pedro	Y	Y	10		Y	Y	Y
District and City
Areguá				11		15	
Arroyos y Esteros			10	Y			
Capiatá			10	Y		15	Y
Capiíbary							R
Capitán Bado						Y	
Carapeguá			Y				
Ciudad del Este						Y	V (Note: Virreina from Grand category)
Colonias Unidas							
Coronel Oviedo			Y	11			
Encarnación				11			
Fernando de la Mora	10		Y				
Fulgencio Yegros							
Fulgencio Yegros							Y
General Artigas				Y			
General Elizardo Aquino						15	
Hernandarias				Y			
Horqueta							15
Itá	Y						
Itauguá				11		Y	Y
Lambaré	10	Y	Y		Y		
Limpio	Y					15	
Luque				Y			S
Mariano Roque Alonso				Y		15	
Minga Guazú				Y		15	
Moisés Bertoni							Y
Ñemby						Y	
Nueva Italia						15	
Nueva Italia (Petite)						15	
Pedro Juan Caballero				Y	Y		
Presidente Franco					Y		
Presidente Franco					Y		Y
San Pedro de Ycuamandiyú					Y		
Santa Ana					10		
San Antonio						Y	
San Lorenzo		10	10	Y	Y	V	15
San Lorenzo		10	10	Y	Y	V	Y
Santa Rita		10					
U.N.A.							V (Note: Virreina from Supranational category)
Villa Elisa			Y				
Villarrica				Y		15	
Villeta						Y	15
Villeta						Y	Y
Yegros							Y
Ypané							15
Paraguayan diaspora
Paraguayan Spaniards							
Paraguayan American						(Note: The winner Miss Grand Paraguay 2023 represent Paraguay in Miss Grand International 2023)	
Total	16	15	16	22	18	24	23
Color keys: : Declared as the winner; : Ended as a 1st runner-up; : Ended as a 2nd runner-up; : Ended as a 3rd runner-up; : Ended as a 4th runner-up; A : Ended as a Virreina (V), Miss Supranational (S), Miss Cosmo (C), Reina Internacional Petite (R), Miss Globe Petite (G); N : Ended as a finalist, semifinalist (N) and unplaced (Y); × : Ended as withdrew during the competition; × : Ended as no representative
