= Miss Grand Asunción =

Regional pageant in Paraguay

- Formation: 1 November 2022; 4 years ago
- Founder: Javier Casco
- Type: Beauty pageant
- Headquarters: Asunción
- Location: Paraguay
- Members: Miss Grand Paraguay
- Official language: Spanish
- Director: Javier Casco (2022–present)
- Parent organization: Javier Casco Producciones (2022–present)

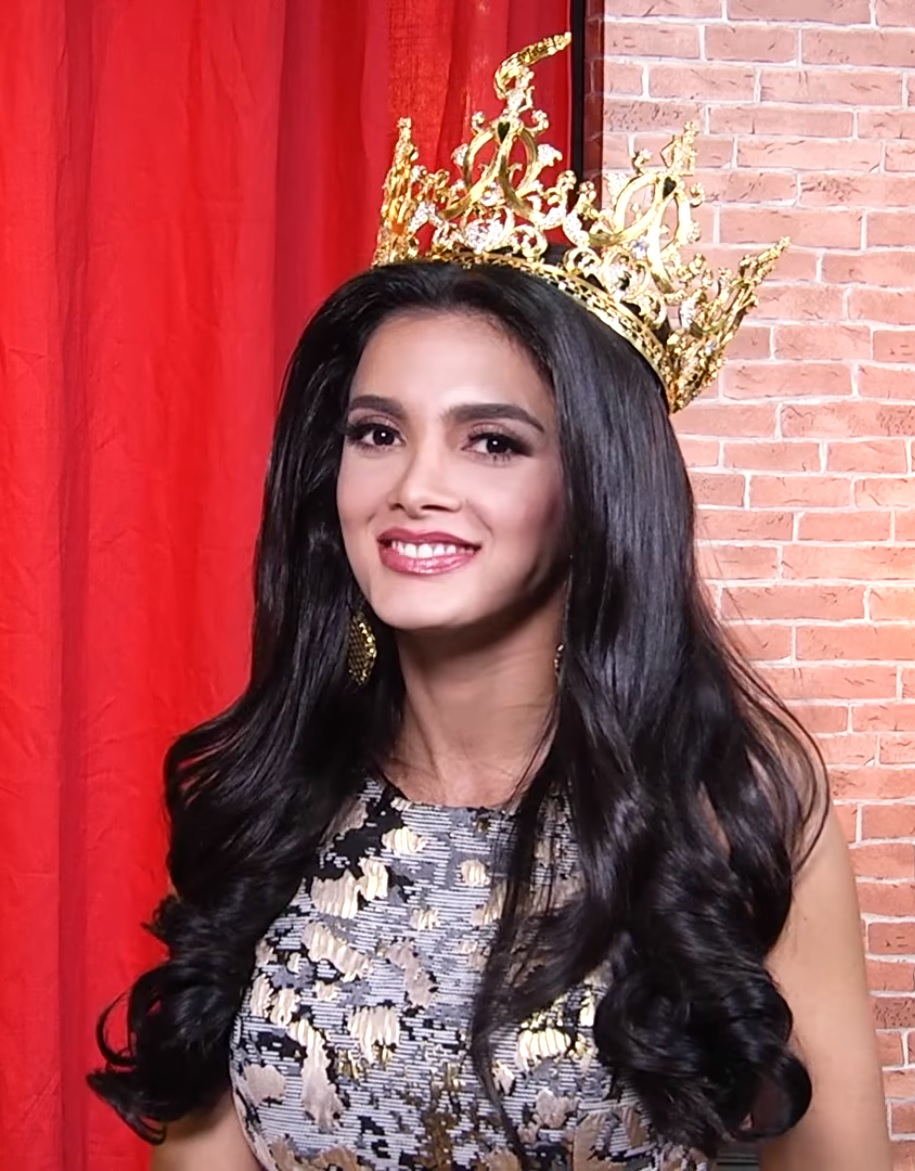
Clara Sosa, Miss Grand Asunción 2018.

Miss Grand Asunción is a regional female beauty pageant in Paraguay, founded in 2022 by Javier Casco, to select Asunción representatives for the Miss Grand Paraguay national pageant.

Asunción has participated in the Miss Grand Paraguay pageant since 2018; however, its representatives were appointed in the early years of participation. Asunción candidate won the pageant once in 2018 by Clara Sosa, who then competed internationally in Myanmar and was named Miss Grand International 2018.

== History ==
Asunción has participated in the Miss Grand Paraguay pageant since the first national edition in 2018. Its first representative, Clara Sosa, was determined through the regional contest named Reina Asunción Universo, where the main winner was sent to compete at the Miss Universe Paraguay pageant. Later in 2022, the right to send an Asunción candidate to compete nationally in Miss Grand Paraguay was granted to a local organizer named Javier Casco Producciones headed by Javier Casco and the first Miss Grand Asunción contest was held in that year.

However, Javier Casco Producciones later renamed the pageant "Reinas de Asunción" the following year, when the city representatives for the Miss Grand Paraguay and Miss Supranational Paraguay national pageants were elected in the same event.

== Editions ==
The following table details Miss Grand Asunción's annual editions since 2022.

Edition	Date	Final venue	Entrants	Winner	Ref.
1st	1 November 2022	Hotel Excelsior, Catedral, Asunción	13	Thiara Zorrilla	
— (Note: As "Reina de Asunción" pageant, where the city representatives for Miss Grand Paraguay and other national pageants were determined.)	8 December 2023	Hotel Excelsior, Catedral, Asunción	18	Ayelen Pérez	

== National competition ==
The following is a list of Asunción representatives who competed in the Miss Grand Paraguay pageant.

Year	Representative	Department-level achievement		Placement at Miss Grand Paraguay	City/department licensee	Ref.
Year	Representative	Pageant	Title	Placement at Miss Grand Paraguay	City/department licensee	Ref.
2018	Clara Sosa	Reina Asunción Universo 2018	Miss Grand Asunción 2018	Winner	Held by the national organizer	
2019	Paloma Martins Reidl	Appointed		Top 10	Appointed by the national organizer	
2021	Bianca Ayala	Appointed		Top 11	Appointed by the national organizer	
2022	Nayeli Portillo	Appointed		Virreina	Appointed by the national organizer	
2023	Thiara Zorrilla	Miss Grand Asunción 2023		1st runner-up	Javier Casco	
2024	No national pageant, the 2024 titleholder was determined through the 2023 national contest.					
2025	Ayelén Pérez	Reina de Asunción 2024	Miss Grand Asunción 2024	Withdrew	Javier Casco	
2025	Ayelen Mendez	Appointed		Virreina – Petite category	Javier Casco	
2026	Verónica Ortiz	Appointed		Supplemenal title winner	—N/a	
