= Miss Grand Paraguay 2022 =

5th Miss Grand Paraguay competition, beauty pageant edition

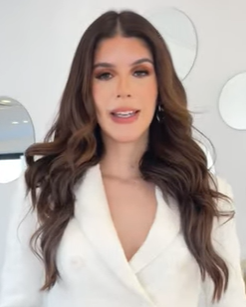
- Agatha Leon, the winner of the contest
- Date: 7 May 2022
- Presenters: Fabián Benítez, Solange Mendez Flores and Lucía Sapena
- Venue: Hotel Guaraní Theatre, Asunción
- Broadcaster: Unicanal
- Entrants: 18
- Placements: 10
- Debuts: Central; Santa Ana; San Pedro de Ycuamandiyú
- Withdrawals: Areguá; Arroyos y Esteros; Capiatá; Colonias Unidas; Coronel Oviedo; Encarnación; General Artigas; Hernandarias; Itauguá; Mariano Roque Alonso; PAR Communities in Spain; Villarrica
- Returns: Ciudad del Este; Caazapá; Fernando de la Mora; Itapúa; Lambaré
- Winner: Agatha Leon (Ciudad del Este)
- Virreina: Nayeli Portillo (Asunción)
- Miss Petite Paraguay: Ingrid Paniagua (Pedro Juan Caballero)

Miss Grand Paraguay 2022 is the fifth edition of the Miss Grand Paraguay beauty contest, held at Hotel Guaraní in Asunción on 7 May 2022, and was beamed live to a virtual audience worldwide via the pageant YouTube channel named MGM Producciones as well as the national digital television network Unicanal.

Seventeen candidates competed for the national title, of which, Agatha Leon of Ciudad del Este was announced the winner and crowned by Jimena Sosa, Miss Grand Paraguay 2021. Leon will later represent the country at Miss Grand International 2022; programmed to be held in Indonesia on 25 October.

== Background ==
=== Location and date ===
After a search for the national aspirants had been launched on 6 December 2021, the organization additionally announced that the coronation will be in May 2022, and later confirmed to be 7 May at Hotel Guaraní in Asunción with the preliminary contest on 5 May at the same venue.

List of the main events in the Miss Grand Paraguay 2022 pageant
Location	Date	Event	Venue	Ref.
Preliminary Host Department: Itapúa	3 May	Official Press Conference	Itapua Government Hall, Encarnación	
Preliminary Host Department: Itapúa	3 May	Top Model and Best Shape competition	Itapua Government Hall, Encarnación	
Final Venue: Asunción	5 May	Preliminary competition	Guarani Hotel Theatre, Asunción	
Final Venue: Asunción	7 May	Grand Final Coronation	Guarani Hotel Theatre, Asunción	

=== Contestant selection ===
The national aspirants for Miss Grand Paraguay 2022 were either selected directly by the online application through the national organizer or chosen by the regional licensees. On 6 December, 2021, the organization launched its search for the next Paraguayan who will represent the country at the Miss Grand International 2022 competition. The final submission of the application was initially set for February 15, 2022. Of the regional licensee category, four of which held the regional event to determine their representative for the national contest, including the licensees of Ciudad del Este, Paraguarí, Presidente Franco, and San Pedro. However, the Presidente Franco licensee later renounced the license, then the representative of such was instead appointed by the central organ. All of 17 national finalists representing 8 departments and 9 cities were officially revealed on 22 April 2022.

List of Miss Grand Paraguay 2022 Regional Pageants, by the coronation date
Location	Pageant	Date & Venue	Entrants	Qualified Title for National Round	Ref.
Paraguarí	Miss Grand Paraguarí	27 June 2021 at Corona Suites Hotel, Carapeguá	20	Miss Grand Paraguarí	
Ciudad del Este	Miss Bellaza Top Paraguay	11 December 2021 at Isaura Hall, Hotel Marambaia, Ciudad del Este	15	Miss Grand Presidente Franco	
Ciudad del Este	Miss Grand Ciudad del Este	18 December 2021 at Howard Johnson Hotel, Ciudad del Este	10	Miss Grand Ciudad del Este	
San Pedro	Miss San Pedro	5 February 2022 at San Estanislao Municipal Gymnasiam, San Estanislao	23	Miss Grand San Pedro; Miss Grand San Pedro de Ycuamandiyú	

== Results summary ==
=== Main placements ===
Miss Grand Paraguay 2022 competition result
Position	Delegate
Miss Grand Paraguay 2022	Ciudad del Este – Agatha Leon
Virreina Miss Grand Paraguay 2022	Asunción – Nayeli Portillo
1st runner-up	Fernando de la Mora – Ailin Adorno
2nd runner-up	Luque – Milenha Montania
3rd runner-up	Minga Guazú – Lorena Román
Semifinalists (Top 10)	Canindeyú – Milena Colman; Central – Alía Díaz Rodriguez; Concepción – Fatima Valdez; Itapúa – Ingrid Semeniuk; Santa Ana – Kendal Hirschfeld

=== Supplementary title ===
Position	Delegate
Miss Petite Paraguay 2022	Pedro Juan Caballero – Ingrid Paniagua
1st runner-up	San Pedro de Ycuamandiyú – Andrea Sosa
2nd runner-up	Caazapá – Romina Duarte Yahari

=== Special awards ===
List of Miss Grand Paraguay 2022 Special Award Winners
Award	Winner
Best Shape	Asunción – Nayeli Portillo
Best Skin	Itapúa – Ingrid Semeniuk
Best Video Presentation	Santa Ana –Kendal Hirschfeld
Miss Social Media	Santa Ana –Kendal Hirschfeld
Miss Sports	Fernando de la Mora – Ailin Adorno
Miss Top Model	Ciudad del Este – Agatha Leon

Miss Grand Paraguay 2022 competition result by department/district

Color keys
Main title: Miss Grand Paraguay
Winner	Fifth place
Second place	Top 10
Third place	Unplaced
Fourth place	Did not participate
Supplementary title: Miss Petite Paraguay
Winner
Second place
Third place

== Contestants ==
18 delegates competed for the national title of Miss Grand Paraguay 2022.

Department/District	Contestans	Age	Height	Ref.
Asunción	Nayeli Portillo	19	1.72 m (5 ft 7 1/2 in)	
Caazapá	Romina Duarte Yahari	20	1.62 m (5 ft 4 in)	
Canindeyú	Milena Colman	19	1.70 m (5 ft 7 in)	
Central	Alía Díaz Rodriguez	24	1.76 m (5 ft 9 1/2 in)	
Ciudad del Este	Agatha Leon	20	1.73 m (5 ft 8 in)	
Concepción	Fatima Valdez	20	1.75 m (5 ft 9 in)	
Fernando de la Mora	Ailin Adorno	24	1.75 m (5 ft 9 in)	
Itapúa	Ingrid Semeniuk	25	1.76 m (5 ft 9 1/2 in)	
Lambaré	Sara Alcaraz	23	1.70 m (5 ft 7 in)	
Luque	Milenha Montania	21	1.74 m (5 ft 8 1/2 in)	
Minga Guazú	Lorena Román	25	1.75 m (5 ft 9 in)	
Paraguarí	Magali Cano	22	1.76 m (5 ft 9 1/2 in)	
Pedro Juan Caballero	Ingrid Paniagua	19	1.68 m (5 ft 6 in)	
Presidente Franco	Patricia Graciano	25	1.75 m (5 ft 9 in)	
Santa Ana	Kendal Hirschfeld	20	1.80 m (5 ft 11 in)	
San Lorenzo	Andrea Nicole Rojas	21	1.75 m (5 ft 9 in)	
San Pedro	Olga Irala	22	1.71 m (5 ft 7 1/2 in)	
San Pedro de Ycuamandiyú	Andrea Sosa	19	1.49 m (4 ft 10 1/2 in)	
