= Miss Grand Paraguay 2018 =

2nd edition of the Miss Grand Paraguay competition

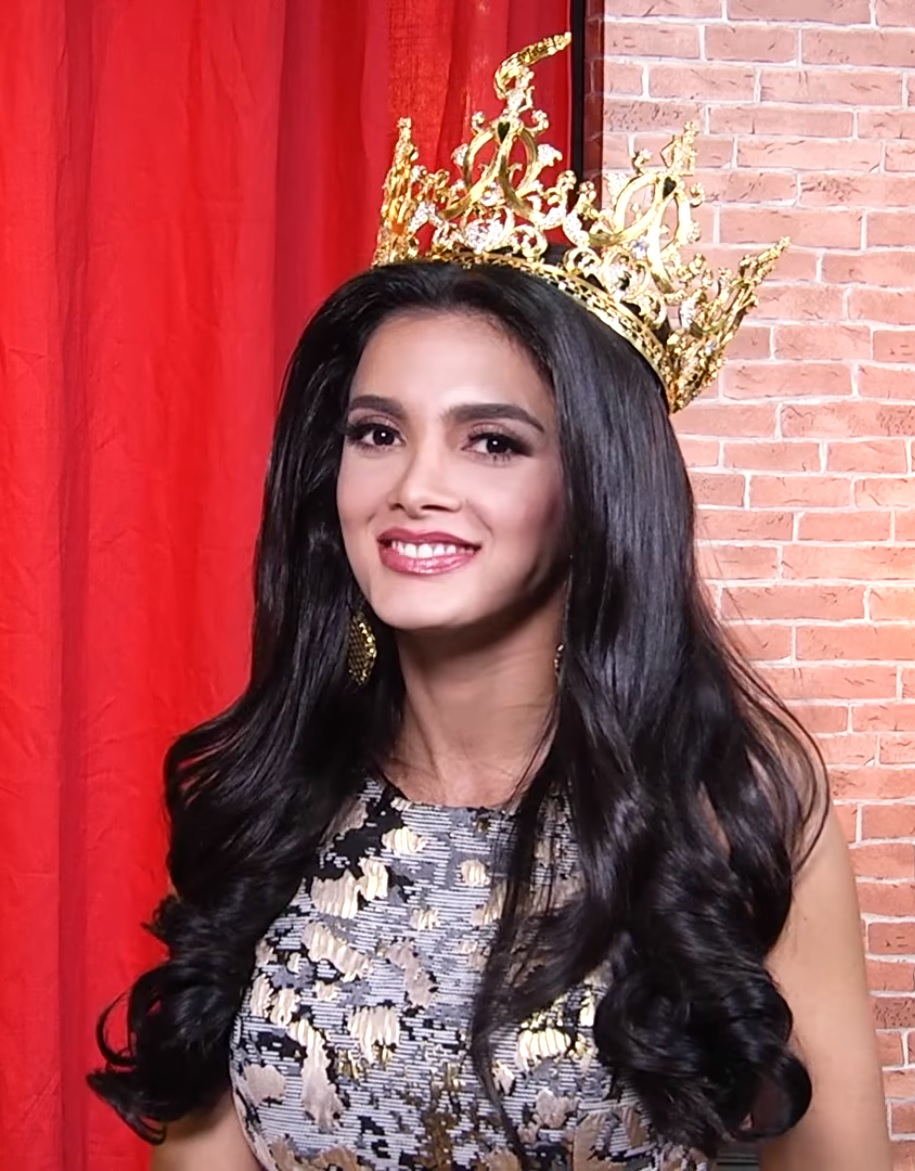
- Miss Grand Paraguay 2018
- Date: June 9, 2018
- Venue: Theater of the Americas, Paraguayan-American Cultural Center (CCPA), Asunción
- Entrants: 15
- Placements: 10
- Debuts: Areguá; Ciudad del Este; Presidente Franco; San Lorenzo; Santa Rita
- Withdrawals: Alto Paraná; Caaguazú; Fernando de la Mora; Guairá; Itá; Limpio
- Winner: Clara Sosa; Asunción

Miss Grand Paraguay 2018 was the second edition of the Miss Grand Paraguay pageant, held on June 9, 2018, at the Theater of the Americas, Paraguayan-American Cultural Center (CCPA) in Asunción. Fifteen national delegates, either determined through the regional pageant or through central casting, competed for the right to represent the country at Miss Grand International 2018, of whom the representative of Asunción, Clara Sosa, was elected the winner. She then participated in the international contest in Myanmar, where she won the title, making her the first Paraguayan candidate to win the Miss Grand International pageant.

== Results ==
Miss Grand Paraguay 2018; 15 national finalists

Final results	Contestant
Miss Grand Paraguay 2018	Asunción - Clara Sosa
1st Runner-Up	Paraguarí - Irene Camacho
2nd Runner-Up	Areguá - Vanessa Ramirez
3rd Runner-Up	Ciudad del Este - Tamara Carvallo
4th Runner-Up	Presidente Franco - Bianca Antonelli
Top 10	Concepción - Brenda Barrios; Itapúa - Liz Heppner; Misiones - Amarilla Blanca; San Lorenzo - Laura Notario; Santa Rita - Anna Niedermeyer

== Contestants ==
15 contestants competed for the title.

State	Contestant
Areguá	Vanessa Ramirez
Asunción	Clara Sosa
Caazapá	Camila De Souza
Canindeyú	Daniela Garcia
Ciudad del Este	Tamara Carvallo
Concepción	Brenda Barrios
Cordillera	Leticia Echeverria
Itapúa	Liz Heppner
Lambaré	Adelaida Cubilla
Misiones	Amarilla Blanca
Paraguarí	Irene Camacho
Presidente Franco	Bianca Antonelli
San Lorenzo	Laura Notario
San Pedro	Romina Caceres
Santa Rita	Anna Niedermeyer
