= Miss Grand Paraguay 2019 =

3rd edition of the Miss Grand Paraguay competition

- Date: July 29, 2019
- Venue: Marshal Convention Center, Asunción
- Entrants: 16
- Placements: 10
- Debuts: Amambay; Arroyos y Esteros; Capiatá; Carapeguá; Coronel Oviedo; Mariano Roque Alonso; Nueva Italia; Villa Elisa
- Withdrawals: Areguá; Caazapá; Canindeyú; Concepción; Cordillera; Misiones; Paraguarí; Presidente Franco; Santa Rita
- Returns: Caaguazú; Fernando de la Mora
- Winner: Milena Rodríguez; Itapúa

Miss Grand Paraguay 2019 was the 3rd edition of the Miss Grand Paraguay pageant, held on July 29, 2019, at the Marshal Convention Center, Asunción. Sixteen national aspirants either chosen through regional pageant or central casting competed for the title, of whom the representative of Itapúa, Milena Rodríguez, was named the winner. She later represented Paraguay at the Miss Grand International 2019 pageant in Venezuela and was placed among the top 20 finalists.

== Results ==
Miss Grand Paraguay 2019; 16 national finalists

Final results	Contestant
Miss Grand Paraguay 2019	Itapúa - Milena Rodríguez
1st Runner-Up	Nueva Italia - Lujan Mendoza
2nd Runner-Up	Mariano Roque Alonso - Clara Berni Prette
3rd Runner-Up	Caaguazú - Venus Calvo
4th Runner-Up	Ciudad del Este - Silvana Duarte Romero
Top 10	Arroyos y Esteros - Sol María Sánchez; Asunción - Paloma Martins Reidl; Capiatá - Sol María Pavón; San Lorenzo - Elena Olevar; San Pedro - Sabrina Samudio

== Contestants ==
16 contestants competed for the title.

State	Contestans
Amambay	Támara Dutra Córdoba
Arroyos y Esteros	Sol María Sánchez
Asunción	Paloma Martins Reidl
Caaguazú	Venus Calvo
Capiatá	Sol María Pavón
Carapeguá	Pamela Britez
Ciudad del Este	Silvana Duarte Romero
Coronel Oviedo	Brenda Flecha
Fdo. De la Mora	María Eugenia Mora
Itapúa	Milena Rodríguez
Lambaré	Melina Belén Aguayo
Mariano Roque Alonso	Clara Berni Prette
Nueva Italia	Lujan Mendoza
San Lorenzo	Elena Olevar
San Pedro	Sabrina Samudio
Villa Elisa	Diana Rojas
