= Miss Grand Paraguay 2017 =

1st edition of the Miss Grand Paraguay competition

- Date: July 29, 2017
- Venue: Agustin Pio Barrios Theater, Japanese Paraguayan Center
- Entrants: 16
- Placements: 10
- Debuts: Alto Paraná; Asunción; Caaguazú; Caazapá; Canindeyú; Concepción; Cordillera; Fernando de la Mora; Guairá; Itá; Itapúa; Lambaré; Limpio; Misiones; Paraguarí; San Pedro
- Winner: Lía Duarte Ashmore (Guairá Department) Guairá

Miss Grand Paraguay 2017 was the first edition of the Miss Grand Paraguay pageant, held on July 29, 2017, at the Agustin Pio Barrios Theater in Japanese Paraguayan Center. Sixteen candidates competed for the title, of whom Lía Duarte Ashmore from the Guairá Department was named the winner, and later represented Paraguay at Miss Grand International 2017 in Vietnam, where she was placed among the top 20 finalists.

The event was broadcast nationwide on La Tele and directed by Gabriel Román, Milciades Marecoand, and Myriam Arévalos,

== Results ==
Miss Grand Paraguay 2017; 16 national finalists

Final results	Contestant
Miss Grand Paraguay 2017	Guairá - Lía Duarte Ashmore
1st Runner-Up	Alto Paraná - Nathalia Méndez
2nd Runner-Up	Asunción - Alejandra Amarilla
3rd Runner-Up	Itapúa - Yenifer Sauer
4th Runner-Up	Cordillera - Jessica Acosta
Top 10	Caaguazú - Ángela Ayala; Caazapá - Luana Novak; Fdo. De la Mora - Karen Piñanez; Lambaré - Analiz Blanco; Paraguarí - Marian Recalde

== Contestants ==
16 contestants competed for the title of Miss Grand Paraguay 2017.

State	Contestant
Alto Paraná	Nathalia Méndez
Asunción	Alejandra Amarilla
Caaguazú	Ángela Ayala
Caazapá	Luana Novak
Canindeyú	Camila Thome
Concepción	Gabriela Duarte
Cordillera	Jessica Acosta
Fdo. De la Mora	Karen Piñanez
Guairá	Lía Ashmore
Itá	Yamila Bernal
Itapúa	Yenifer Sauer
Lambaré	Analiz Blanco
Limpio	Michelle Easteen
Misiones	Laura Lindstrom
Paraguarí	Marian Recalde
San Pedro	Nathalia Segovia
