= Miss Grand Paraguay 2021 =

4th edition of the Miss Grand Paraguay competition

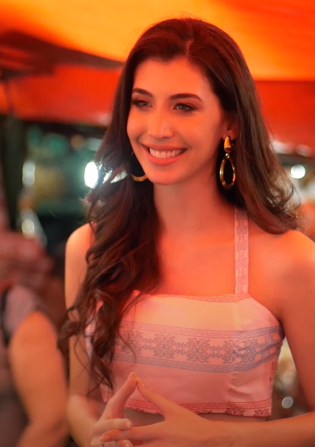
- Miss Grand Paraguay 2021
- Date: July 3, 2021
- Venue: Hotel Guaraní Asunción
- Entrants: 22
- Placements: 11
- Debuts: Colonias Unidas; Encarnación; General Artigas; Hernandarias; Itauguá; Luque; Minga Guazú; PAR Communities in Spain; Pedro Juan Caballero; Villarrica
- Withdrawals: Amambay; Caaguazú; Carapeguá; Ciudad del Este; Fernando de la Mora; Lambaré; Nueva Italia; Villa Elisa
- Returns: Areguá; Canindeyú; Concepción; Paraguarí; Presidente Franco
- Winner: Jimena Sosa; Colonias Unidas

Miss Grand Paraguay 2021 was the 4th edition of the Miss Grand Paraguay pageant, held on July 3, 2021, at the Hotel Guaraní in Asunción. The contest featured twenty-two candidates, either chosen through regional pageants or through central casting, competed for the title, of whom the representative from Colonias Unidas, Jimena Sosa, was named the winner. She then represented Paraguay in the Miss Grand International 2021 pageant in Thailand, but got a non-placement.

== Results ==
Miss Grand Paraguay 2021; 22 national finalists

| Final results | Contestant |
|---|---|
| Miss Grand Paraguay 2021 | Colonias Unidas - Jimena Sosa |
| 1st Runner-Up | Presidente Franco - Lorena Rodríguez |
| 2nd Runner-Up | San Pedro - Liz Valdovinos |
| 3rd Runner-Up | PAR Communities in Spain - Elicena Andrada |
| 4th Runner-Up | Concepción - Angelica Peña Testa |
| Top 11 | Areguá - Juliel Pöckel; Asunción - Bianca Ayala; Canindeyú - Elena Toledo; Coronel Oviedo - Dahiana Aquino; Encarnación - Emma Báez; Itauguá - Nara Bardales |

== Contestants ==
22 contestants competed for the title.

| State | Contestans |
|---|---|
| Areguá | Juliel Pöckel |
| Arroyos y Esteros | Nayeli Riquelme |
| Asunción | Bianca Ayala |
| Canindeyú | Elena Toledo |
| Capiatá | Lenny Rojas |
| Colonias Unidas | Jimena Sosa |
| Concepción | Angelica Peña Testa |
| Coronel Oviedo | Dahiana Aquino |
| Encarnación | Emma Báez |
| General Artigas | Fátima Ruíz Díaz |
| Hernandarias | Violeta Van Humbeck |
| Itauguá | Nara Bardales |
| Luque | Gina Antonella |
| Mariano Roque Alonso | Elena Mora |
| Minga Guazú | Adriana Marecos |
| Paraguarí | Eliana Fernández |
| PAR Communities in Spain | Elicena Andrada |
| Pedro Juan Caballero | Lisa Morigano |
| Presidente Franco | Lorena Rodríguez |
| San Lorenzo | Cecilla Salinas |
| San Pedro | Liz Valdovinos |
| Villarrica | Karen Rodríguez |
