= Caaguazú =

Caaguazú may refer to places in Paraguay:

- Caaguazú Department
- Caaguazú district
