= Coffee production in Paraguay =

Agricultural industry

The production of coffee in Paraguay began in the late 19th century. Plantations were known at that time near Asunción and Limpio.

== History ==
In 1889, there were 83,966 coffee trees in the country; considering the similarity of soil and climatic conditions between Paraguay and Brazil, it was surmised then that the coffee produced in Paraguay would be as good as that produced in Brazil. Initially, coffee was grown in areas where soil and weather conditions suited such growth and on a small scale. Commercially viable plantations in the country were started only after many experimental plantations proved successful. This was followed by the Banco Agricola of Paraguay providing funds to several government agencies to freely distribute the plants to farmers for cultivation. Thousands of trees were planted in plantations in the mountains of Alto Paraguay, not far from the city of Asunción. In each plantation, the average number of trees planted varied from 1,500 to 2,000 with a maximum of 10,000 trees in one plantation.

Plantations in northern Paraguay was established in 1967. Most of the coffee produced in the plantations were found acceptable for domestic consumption. In the 1970s, the main coffee producing areas were noted to be the Amambay, Alto Parana, and Canindeyú departments.

Coffea arabica production was 180 tons in 2006 and export amounted to 36 tons. In 2013, coffee production was 382 tons from an area of 69 hectares (170 acres) with yield level of 12,993 hectograms per ha, and its world share was negligible.

== See also ==
- List of countries by coffee production

== Bibliography ==
- Commerce, United States. Dept. of (1920). Paraguay, a commercial handbook. U.S. Government Printing Office. p. 60.
- Dardye, Emmanuel Bourgade La (1892). Paraguay: the land and the people, natural wealth and commercial capabilities. G. Philip & son. p. 182.
- Graham, Harry Crusen (1912). Coffee: Production, trade, and consumption by countries. Govt. print. off.
- Union, Pan American (1902). Coffee: Extensive Information and Statistics. U.S. Government Printing Office.
- (U.S.), National Center for Chronic Disease Control; Program, National Center for Chronic Disease Control. Nutrition (1967). Republic of Paraguay Nutrition Survey: May-August 1965. U.S. Government Printing Office.
