= Clementino (disambiguation) =

Clementino (born 1982), stage name of Clemente Maccaro, is an Italian rapper and actor.

Clementino may also refer to:

== People ==
- Clementino González (born 1990), Paraguayan footballer
- Clementino Ocampos (1913–2001), Paraguayan composer and poet
- Danilo Clementino (born 1982), Brazilian former footballer
- Diego Clementino (born 1984), Brazilian footballer
- Francisco Clementino San Tiago Dantas (1911–1964), Brazilian journalist, lawyer, teacher and politician
- José Bispo Clementino dos Santos (1913–2008), known as Jamelão, Brazilian samba singer
- Severino de Ramos Clementino da Silva (born 1986), known as Nino Paraíba, Brazilian footballer

== Places ==
- Collegio Clementino, palace in Rome, Italy
- Museo Pio-Clementino, one of the Vatican Museums in Rome, Italy
- Palazzo Caffarelli-Clementino, palace in Rome, Italy
- Vila Clementino, neighbourhood of Rio de Janeiro, Brazil
