= Edgar Rolón =

Paraguayan footballer (born 1983)

Personal information
- Full name: Edgar Enrique Rolón Dadak
- Date of birth: November 28, 1981 (age 44)
- Place of birth: Fernando de la Mora, Paraguay
- Height: 1.81 m (5 ft 11 in)
- Position: Midfielder

Senior career*
Years	Team	Apps	(Gls)
2004	Sport Colombia	2	(0)
2005–2006	Guaraní	16	(0)
2006	Fernando de la Mora	5	(0)
2007	2 de Mayo	3	(0)
2007–2008	Persekabpas Pasuruan		
2008	Benjamín Aceval		
2009	Deportes Puerto Montt	15	(1)
2010–2011	General Caballero ZC	32	(2)
2011	Persela Lamongan		
2012	Atlético Colegiales		
2012	Makassar United		
2013	PSMS Medan		
- * Club domestic league appearances and goals

Edgar Enrique Rolón Dadak (born November 28, 1983) is a former Paraguayan footballer who played as a midfielder.

== Career ==
Rolón began his football career with Club Sport Colombia. He moved to Club Guaraní where, after a spell with the reserves, he joined the first team following an injury to fellow midfielder Pedro Richard Irala.

=== Teams ===
- (Paraguay) Sport Colombia 2004
- (Paraguay) Guaraní 2005-2006
- (Paraguay) Fernando de la Mora 2006
- (Paraguay) 2 de Mayo 2007
- (Indonesia) Persekabpas Pasuruan 2007–2008
- (Paraguay) Benjamín Aceval 2008
- (Chile) Deportes Puerto Montt 2009
- (Paraguay) General Caballero ZC 2010–2011
- (Indonesia) Persela Lamongan 2011
- (Paraguay) Atlético Colegiales 2012
- (Indonesia) Makassar United
- (Indonesia) PSMS Medan 2013
