= Juan Carlos Campuzano =

Paraguayan-American physicist (born 1949)

Juan Carlos Campuzano (born July 25, 1949) is a Paraguayan American physicist. He is a Distinguished Professor of Physics at the University of Illinois at Chicago. He was a Distinguished Fellow at Argonne National Laboratory (the equivalent of an endowed chair), and a he is also a 2001 American Physical Society Fellow and a recipient of the 2011 Oliver Buckley Prize in Condensed Matter Physics. He is an expert in high-temperature superconductivity.

Campuzano obtained his B.S. and Ph.D. in physics from University of Wisconsin–Milwaukee in 1972 and 1978, respectively. He has also worked as a postdoctoral fellow and research associate at the University of Liverpool and the University of Cambridge. His research interests include infrared spectroscopy on metal surfaces, electronic excitations in high temperature superconductors and other materials, etc.

== Education ==
- Ph.D., Physics, University of Wisconsin–Milwaukee, 1978.
- B.S., Applied Mathematics and Physics, University of Wisconsin–Milwaukee, 1972.

== Awards ==
- Buckley Prize, 2011
- Outstanding Alumnus Award, University of Wisconsin-Milwaukee 2008
- HENAAC Outstanding Technical Achievement Award, 2007
- Fellow, American Physical Society, 2001.
- The University of Chicago Medal for Distinguished Performance at Argonne National Laboratory, 1999.
- Fellow, Cambridge Philosophical Society, 1985
- The American Vacuum Society Scholar, 1975.
- Research Fellowship, International Centre for Theoretical Physics, Trieste, Italy, 1974.

== Selected publications ==
- Souma, S.; Machida, Y.; Sato, T.; Takahashi, T.; Matsui, H.; Wang, S.-C.; Ding, H.; Kaminski, A.; Campuzano, J. C.; Sasaki, S.; Kadowaki, K. (2003). "The origin of multiple superconducting gaps in MgB_{2}". Nature. 423 (6935). Springer Science and Business Media LLC: 65–67. Bibcode:2003Natur.423...65S. doi:10.1038/nature01619. ISSN 0028-0836. PMID 12721624. S2CID 4380957.
- Kaminski, A.; Rosenkranz, S.; Fretwell, H. M.; Campuzano, J. C.; Li, Z.; Raffy, H.; Cullen, W. G.; You, H.; Olson, C. G.; Varma, C. M.; Höchst, H. (2002). "Spontaneous breaking of time-reversal symmetry in the pseudogap state of a high-Tc superconductor". Nature. 416 (6881). Springer Science and Business Media LLC: 610–613. arXiv:cond-mat/0203133. doi:10.1038/416610a. ISSN 0028-0836. PMID 11948344. S2CID 4417803.
- Norman, M. R.; Randeria, M.; Jankó, B.; Campuzano, J. C. (2000-06-01). "Condensation energy and spectral functions in high-temperature superconductors". Physical Review B. 61 (21). American Physical Society (APS): 14742–14750. arXiv:cond-mat/9912043. Bibcode:2000PhRvB..6114742N. doi:10.1103/physrevb.61.14742. ISSN 0163-1829. S2CID 119408493.
- Norman, M. R.; Ding, H.; Randeria, M.; Campuzano, J. C.; Yokoya, T.; Takeuchi, T.; Takahashi, T.; Mochiku, T.; Kadowaki, K.; Guptasarma, P.; Hinks, D. G. (1998). "Destruction of the Fermi surface in underdoped high-Tc superconductors". Nature. 392 (6672). Springer Science and Business Media LLC: 157–160. arXiv:cond-mat/9710163v2. doi:10.1038/32366. ISSN 0028-0836. S2CID 4394844.
- Norman, M. R.; Ding, H.; Campuzano, J. C.; Takeuchi, T.; Randeria, M.; Yokoya, T.; Takahashi, T.; Mochiku, T.; Kadowaki, K. (1997-11-03). "Unusual Dispersion and Line Shape of the Superconducting State Spectra of Bi_{2}Sr_{2}CaCu_{2}O_{8+δ}". Physical Review Letters. 79 (18). American Physical Society (APS): 3506–3509. arXiv:cond-mat/9702144. Bibcode:1997PhRvL..79.3506N. doi:10.1103/physrevlett.79.3506. ISSN 0031-9007. S2CID 118594581.
- Ding, H.; Yokoya, T.; Campuzano, J. C.; Takahashi, T.; Randeria, M.; Norman, M. R.; Mochiku, T.; Kadowaki, K.; Giapintzakis, J. (1996). "Spectroscopic evidence for a pseudogap in the normal state of underdoped high-Tc superconductors". Nature. 382 (6586). Springer Science and Business Media LLC: 51–54. doi:10.1038/382051a0. ISSN 0028-0836. S2CID 4354355.
