= Clementino Ocampos =

Paraguayan composer and poet

- Born: Clementino Ocampos; November 14, 1913; San Lorenzo, Paraguay
- Died: January 4, 2001 (aged 87) Asunción Paraguay
- Occupation: Poet

Clementino Ocampos (San Lorenzo, Paraguay, 1913 – January 4, 2001) was a Paraguayan poet who wrote in Spanish and Guarani. His only book had the Guarani title Pyhare memby (Child of the Night, in Spanish Hijo de la noche)
