= Paraguayan Americans =

Americans of Paraguayan birth or descent

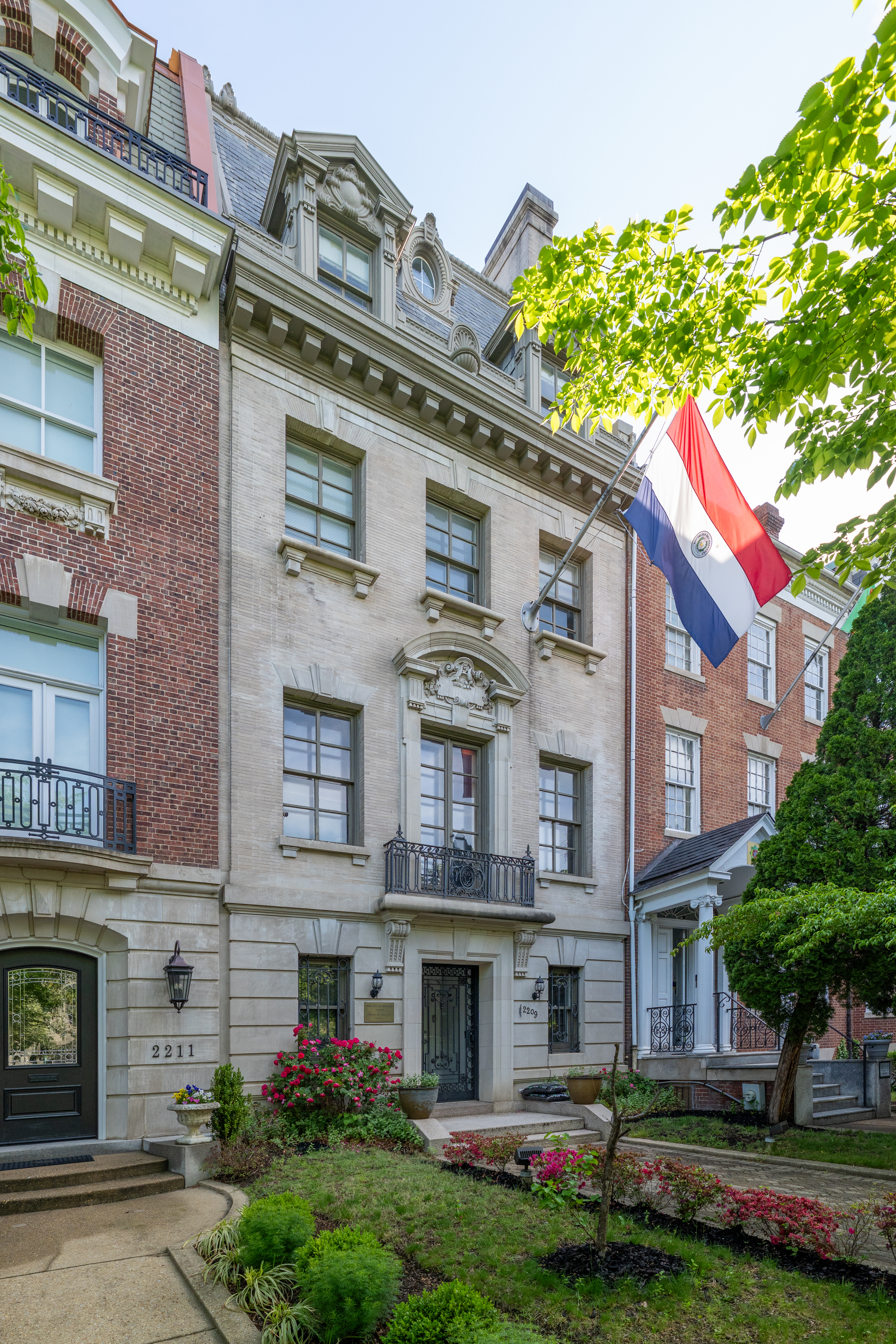
- The Embassy of Paraguay to the United States in Washington, D.C.

Total population
- 25,022 (2018)

Regions with significant populations
- New York City; Boston; Philadelphia; Chicago; Milwaukee; Washington, D.C.; Raleigh; Atlanta; Miami; Louisville; Minneapolis; Dallas; Seattle; Denver; Los Angeles

Languages
- American English · Spanish · Guarani · Spanglish

Religion
- Roman Catholicism

Related ethnic groups
- Indigenous peoples in Paraguay, Afro-Paraguayans, White Paraguayans, Argentine Americans, Uruguayan Americans, Chinese Americans, Japanese Americans, Korean Americans

Paraguayan Americans (Spanish: paraguayo-americano, norteamericano de origen paraguayo or estadounidense de origen paraguayo) are Americans of Paraguayan descent.

The Paraguayan population in the United States at the 2010 Census was 24,933. Paraguayans are the smallest Hispanic group in the United States. The Paraguayan population is concentrated mainly in Queens, NY, Westchester County, NY, and Somerset County, NJ. Additional areas of concentration include Miami-Dade County and Montgomery County. The highest concentration of Paraguayans in the U.S. reside in Somerset County, NJ.

== History ==
The first Paraguayans emigrated between the years of 1841 and 1850. At that time, Paraguayans were not coming directly to the United States from Paraguay, but through other countries such as Brazil, Argentina, and Peru. The Paraguayan residents in the U.S. were included in the early records in the group of "other" South Americans. During those years, 3,579 "other" immigrants arrived. In 1979, close to 11,000 Paraguayans went to live in the United States, but the numbers declined rapidly. In 1982, 4,000 Paraguayans immigrated to the United States. The reasons of migration were varied, but many immigrants were young people that wanted study in American universities.

Additionally, some of the immigrants arrived for political persecutions or to escape civil riots. More women than men migrated to the United States, although the numerical difference was not significant, and most of them lacked jobs. In addition, many American marriages adopted Paraguayan infants. More than a thousand Paraguayan infants were adopted in this country. Of these, 254 were adopted in 1989, 405 in 1993 and 351 in 1995.

== Socioeconomics ==
Paraguayan American women generally work in hotel housekeeping and in the agriculture (in California and Kansas). Paraguay and Kansas founded Partners of the Americas, a non-profit exchange program. This is because of the similarities between the two regions, as they both make a living from raising livestock and growing wheat, both are landlocked, and both are the same size and population.

Most Paraguayan Americans speak Spanish, Guarani (indigenous language of Paraguay), and English very well.

== Demographics ==
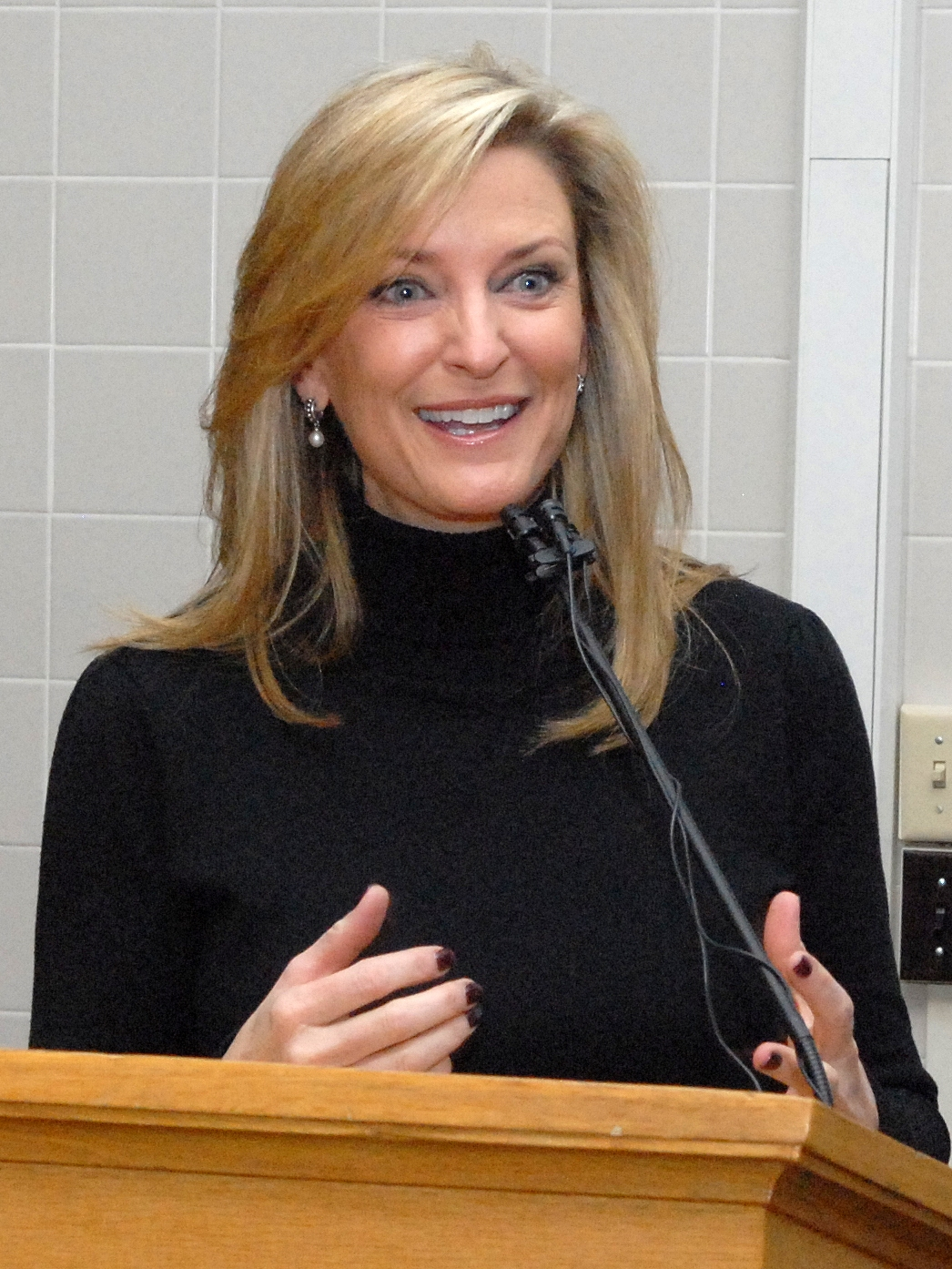
Sharlene Wells was the first foreign-born, bilingual Miss America.

The large populations of Paraguayan Americans are in New York City, Miami, and Los Angeles. Paraguayan Americans also have population importance in Dallas and Atlanta. Many Paraguayan Americans have jobs in the service industry in urban zones such as Minneapolis, Chicago or states like New York and New Jersey.

=== States and residence areas ===
The 10 states with the largest population of Paraguayans (Source: 2000 Census):

1. New York - 5,940
2. Florida - 2,222
3. New Jersey - 1,964
4. California - 1,228
5. Maryland - 1,161
6. Virginia - 924
7. Texas - 763
8. Pennsylvania - 500
9. Connecticut - 494
10. Illinois - 423

The largest population of Paraguayans are situated in the following areas (Source: Census 2000):

1. New York-Northern New Jersey-Long Island, NY-NJ-PA MSA - 7,492
2. Washington-Arlington-Alexandria, DC-VA-MD-WV MSA - 1,793
3. Miami-Fort Lauderdale-Pompano Beach, FL MSA - 1,531
4. Los Angeles-Long Beach-Santa Ana, CA MSA - 509
5. Chicago-Joliet-Naperville, IL-IN-WI MSA - 375
6. Philadelphia-Camden-Wilmington, PA-NJ-DE-MD MSA - 358
7. Bridgeport-Stamford-Norwalk, CT MSA - 336
8. Boston-Cambridge-Quincy, MA-NH MSA- 301
9. Atlanta-Sandy Springs-Marietta, GA MSA - 267
10. Houston-Sugar Land-Baytown, TX MSA - 264
11. Dallas-Fort Worth-Arlington, TX MSA - 236
12. Minneapolis-St. Paul-Bloomington, MN-WI MSA - 229
13. San Francisco-Oakland-Fremont, CA MSA - 191
14. Baltimore-Towson, MD MSA - 158
15. Orlando-Kissimmee-Sanford, FL MSA - 144
16. Richmond, VA MSA - 131
17. Phoenix-Mesa-Glendale, AZ MSA - 128
18. Tampa-St. Petersburg-Clearwater, FL MSA - 113
19. Las Vegas-Paradise, NV MSA - 109
20. Riverside-San Bernardino-Ontario, CA MSA - 108

=== U.S. communities with largest population of people of Paraguayan ancestry ===
The top 25 U.S. communities with the highest populations of Paraguayans (Source: Census 2010)

1. New York, NY - 3,534
2. Bernardsville, NJ - 266
3. White Plains, NY - 260
4. Harrison, NY - 235
5. Los Angeles, CA - 180
6. Washington, D.C. - 161
7. Raritan, NJ - 147
8. Greenburgh, NY - 144
9. Peapack-Gladstone, NJ - 142
10. Miami, FL - 131
11. Mamaroneck (Village), NY - 130
12. Houston, TX - 119
13. Somerville, NJ - 114
14. Arlington, VA - 113
15. Rye (Town), NY - 102
16. Chicago, IL and Rockville, MD - 101
17. Mamaroneck (Town), NY - 88
18. Miami Beach, FL - 87
19. Bridgewater Township, NJ - 82
20. Bedminster Township, NJ - 81
21. Yonkers, NY - 79
22. North Bethesda, MD - 78
23. Aspen Hill, MD - 77
24. Philadelphia, PA and Dallas, TX - 74
25. Greenwich, CT and Wheaton, MD - 71

=== U.S. communities with high percentages of people of Paraguayan ancestry ===
U.S. communities with the highest percentages of Paraguayans as a percent of total population (Source: Census 2010)

1. Far Hills, NJ - 5.77%
2. Peapack-Gladstone, NJ - 5.50%
3. Bernardsville, NJ - 3.45%
4. Raritan, NJ - 2.14%
5. Bedminster Township, NJ - 1.00%

Paraguayans are more than 1% of the entire population in only five communities in the United States. All of these communities are located in Somerset County, NJ.

== Notable people ==
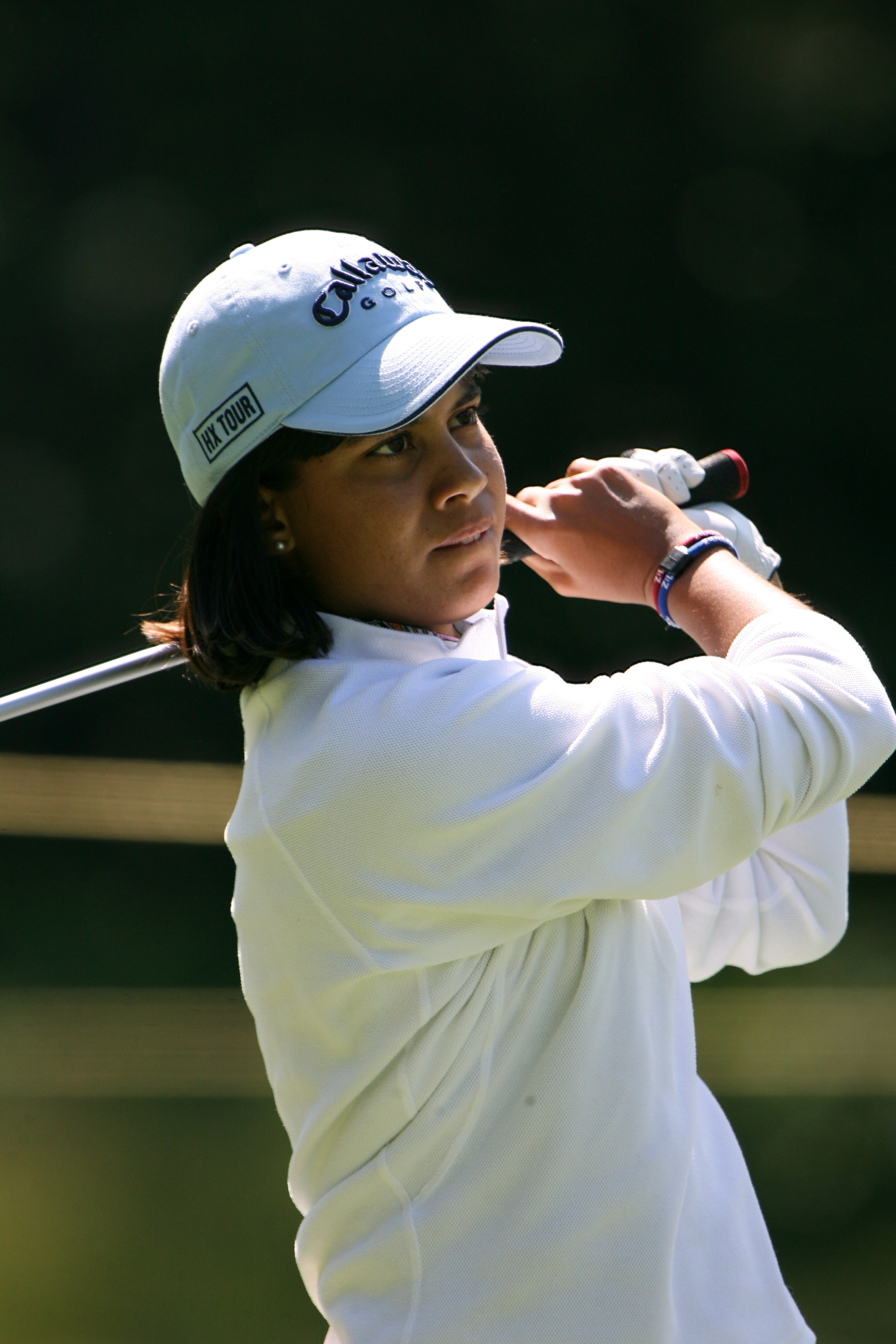
Julieta Granada professional golfer.

=== Sports ===
- Aldo Cubilla, footballer
- Daniel Farrar, football manager
- Sofia García, golfer
- Juan Esteban Godoy, former footballer
- Julieta Granada, golfer
- Gerardo "Jerry" Laterza. former footballer
- Bryan López, former football goalkeeper
- Julia Marino, Olympic freestyle skier
- Gustavo Neffa, former footballer
- Benny Ricardo, former American football placekicker
- Rossana de los Ríos, former tennis player
- Celeste Troche, former golfer

=== Politics ===
- Lisa Cano Burkhead, former Lieutenant Governor of Nevada
- Jessica González-Rojas, New York State Assembly member for the 34th district (Queens)
- Angelita Morillo, Portland City Council member
- Andrés Rodríguez Pedotti, former president of Paraguay

=== Other ===
- Ser Anzoategui, actor
- Raquel Brailowsky-Cabrera, anthropologist
- Juan Carlos Campuzano, physicist
- Ingrid Rimland, novelist
- Sharlene Wells Hawkes, Miss America 1985
- Faith Wilding, multidisciplinary artist

== See also ==
- Paraguay–United States relations
- Rutherford B. Hayes
- Presidente Hayes Department
- EF English Proficiency Index
- Eastern Airlines, LLC
