= General Elizardo Aquino =

- Location within Paraguay
- Coordinates: 24°26′24″S 56°42′0″W
- Country: Paraguay
- Department: San Pedro

Population (2008)
  - Total: 3 444

General Elizardo Aquino is a town in the San Pedro department of Paraguay.

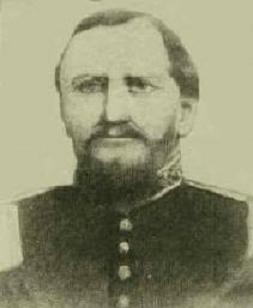
Elizardo Aquino
(1824 – 1866)

== See also ==
- Paraguayan War

== Sources ==
- World Gazeteer: Paraguay – World-Gazetteer.com
