= Santa Ana (Asunción) =

Coordinates: 25.3170°S 57.6585°W

- Barrio
- Interactive map of Santa Ana
- Country: Paraguay
- Autonomous Capital District: Gran Asunción
- City: Asunción

Area
  - Total: 2.98 km^{2} (1.15 sq mi)
- Elevation: 43 m (141 ft)

Population
  - Total: 5,200

Santa Ana is a neighbourhood (barrio) of Asunción, Paraguay.

== Boundaries ==
Santa Ana is bordered by San Cayetano to the southeast, Roberto L. Pettit to the northeast, Tacumbu to the northwest, and by the Paraguay River to the southwest.
