= Mariano Roque Alonso, Paraguay =

Mariano Roque Alonso
- City

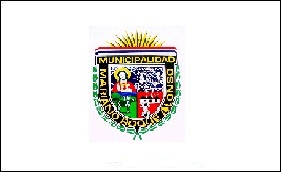
- Flag

- Location within Paraguay
- Coordinates: 25°12′44″S 57°31′59″W
- Country: Paraguay
- Department: Central Department

Area
  - Total: 122 km^{2} (47 sq mi)
- Elevation: 64 m (210 ft)

Population (2016)
  - Total: 97,585
  - Density: 696/km^{2} (1,800/sq mi)
- Area code: 021
- Climate: Cfa

Mariano Roque Alonso (Spanish pronunciation: [maˈɾja.no ˈro.ke aˈlon.so]) is a district and city located in the Central Department of Paraguay, in the Gran Asunción metropolitan area. The city has a population of approximately 85,000 people.

The city was founded in 1944 and is located between the Paraguay River and the Transchaco Road, approximately 18 kilometers away from the city of Asunción. This optimal location has allowed the city to experience rapid commercial, industrial, and social development.

The town is known for the fact that, on the afternoon of February 4, 1996, LAC Colombia Flight 028 crashed while taking off from Silvio Pettirossi International Airport, killing four crew members and eighteen people on the ground. With a total of 22 people dead, it is the worst air accident in the history of Paraguay.

The economy of Mariano Roque Alonso is primarily supported by commercial, port and fishing activities. It is also the home of the Mariano Roque Alonso International Expo Fair, Paraguay's largest annual Expo show, where companies and industries showcase their latest products.
