= Mariano Roque Alonso =

President of Paraguay (1792–1853)

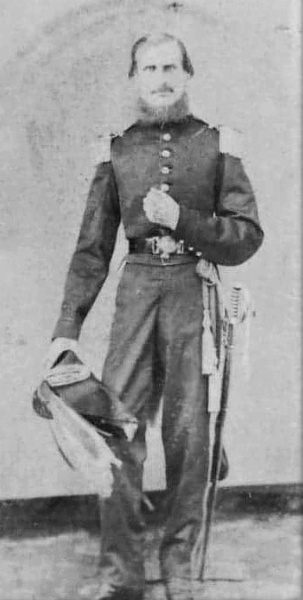
Mariano Roque Alonso

Mariano Roque Alonso Romero (16 August 1792 Ybytimí – 7 August 1853) was a Paraguayan militia officer. Amid political turmoil following the September 1840 death of supreme dictator José Gaspar Rodríguez de Francia Alonso intervened to take power from an ineffective triumvirate that had itself taken power from a military junta. Alonso ruled as general commander of arms from 9 February until 12 March when a Congress was called that declared him joint consul with Carlos Antonio López. Alonso left much of the work of government to López and retired in 1844 when López was appointed president for ten years.

== Consulship ==
Alonso was a barely literate officer of the militia, who held the rank of colonel by 1841. Following the September 1840 death of supreme dictator José Gaspar Rodríguez de Francia Paraguay was governed by the ineffectual military junta of Manuel Antonio Ortiz. When the junta failed to call a congress, on 23 January 1841 a group of infantrymen led by two sergeants arrested the junta and proclaimed a triumvirate. This triumvirate also failed to call a congress and on 9 February was itself deposed by Alonso who declared himself general commander of arms.

Alonso formed a joint consulship with the more learned, former-lawyer Carlos Antonio López, approved by a Congress that met on 12 March. Much of the work of government was carried out by López who accordingly received a salary of 3,000 pesos per year, while Alonso was afforded only 2,000. Alonso interfered little in the government, preferring to associate with his soldiers, and appeared in minor roles at ceremonial occasions. The congress of 1844 granted power to López alone with a ten-year term as president.

== Later life and legacy ==
After the consulship was abolished by López, Alonso was rewarded with a substantial pension for his loyalty and for preventing the military from interfering with the government of the country. Alonso retired to a cattle ranch in the interior and remained there until his death in 1853.

Political offices
Preceded by Juan José Medina	General Commander of Arms; 1841	Succeeded by Junta abolished
Preceded by Position recreated	Consul of the Republic; 1841–1844	Succeeded by Carlos Antonio López
