= Caaguazú district =

Caaguazú Ka'aguasu
- City and district
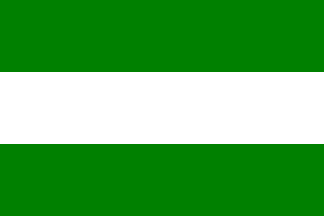
- Flag

- Location within Paraguay
- Coordinates: 25°27′36″S 56°1′12″W
- Country: Paraguay
- Department: Caaguazú
- Founded: May 8, 1845

Government
  - Intendant: Severo Jose Ríos (PLRA)

Area
  - Total: 977.64 km^{2} (377.47 sq mi)

Population (Est. 2021)
  - Total: 127,328
- Demonym: Caaguazeño/a
- Postal code: 3400
- Area code: 522
- Website: http://caaguazu.gov.py/

Caaguazú (Spanish pronunciation: [ka(a)ɣwaˈsu]; Guarani: Ka'aguasu) is a district and city in the department of the same name in Paraguay.

== History ==
The area was originally called Picadas de Ka'aguasu. which means 'the clearings of the big forest'. These lands were acquired by a man named Cristobal Villalba from Villarrica through a royal land grant in 1706 and in 1762 they were inherited by his son named Sebastian. These lands bordered the hills of Ybytyruzu to the south, the pathways to the yerba mate plantations of Curuguaty to the north, the hills of San Joaquin to the west and Parana River shores to the east.

During the dictatorship of Gaspar de Francia, since 1820, the benefits of yerba mate grew within the population. In 1840, a group of soldiers and workers started a government-owned farmstead in the area. Four years later this farmstead would be organized as Guardia del Empalado by the president Carlos Antonio Lopez. As there was a threat of an invasion of Brazilians coming from the east, president Lopez had 11 thatched roof houses built near a lagoon named La Patria to be occupied by 11 families coming from Guairá. This settlement was organized by the Military Command of Villarrica.

The crew of the 11 first families arrived from Villarrica in 1845 and in 1850, 17 more families arrived. They opened a school that same year and in 1852 the local priest Ignacio Gauto build the first chapel with the help of the neighbors. In 1884, the new municipality of Caaguazu was conformed and separated from the one in Villarrica.

== Demographics ==
In 2022 the local census bureau registered a total population of 128,582 people.

== Economy ==
Caaguazú had the greatest concentration of sawmills in Paraguay about fifteen to twenty years ago and up until today is still called the “Wood Capital” of Paraguay, in Spanish (Capital de la Madera). Caaguazú still has more than ten big wood industries producing wood flooring among other things, although many sawmills have mostly moved to the northeastern part of Paraguay, where there are many more trees to log.

== Transportation ==
National routes PY02 and PY13 pass through the city. PY02 connects it with the two major urban areas of the country, Asunción 173 km (107 mi) west, and Ciudad del Este 135 km (84 mi) east. The closest airport to the district is Guaraní International Airport (AGT). Distance from the airport to Caaguazú is about 120 kilometers.

== Notable people ==
- Usha Didi Gunatita, drag artist and activist
