= Limpio =

- City and district
- San José de los Campos Limpios de Tapúa
- Location within Paraguay
- Coordinates: 25°10′06″S 57°29′39″W
- Country: Paraguay
- Department: Central
- Founded: February 1, 1785
- Founder: Pedro Melo de Portugal

Government
  - Intendente Municipal: Octaciano Claudio Gomez Berlangieri

Area
  - City: 117 km^{2} (45 sq mi)
- Elevation: 60 m (200 ft)

Population (2022)
  - City: 139,652
  - Density: 23/km^{2} (60/sq mi)
- Postal code: 2020
- Area code: +595 (291)
- Climate: Cfa

San José de los Campos Limpios de Tapúa, more commonly referred to simply as Limpio (Spanish pronunciation: [ˈlim.pjo], is a district and city located in the Central Department of Paraguay, 20 kilometres (12 mi) from Asunción. The city is bordered by three rivers: The Paraguay River, the Salado River, and the San Francisco River. Its patron saint is Saint Joseph.

== History ==
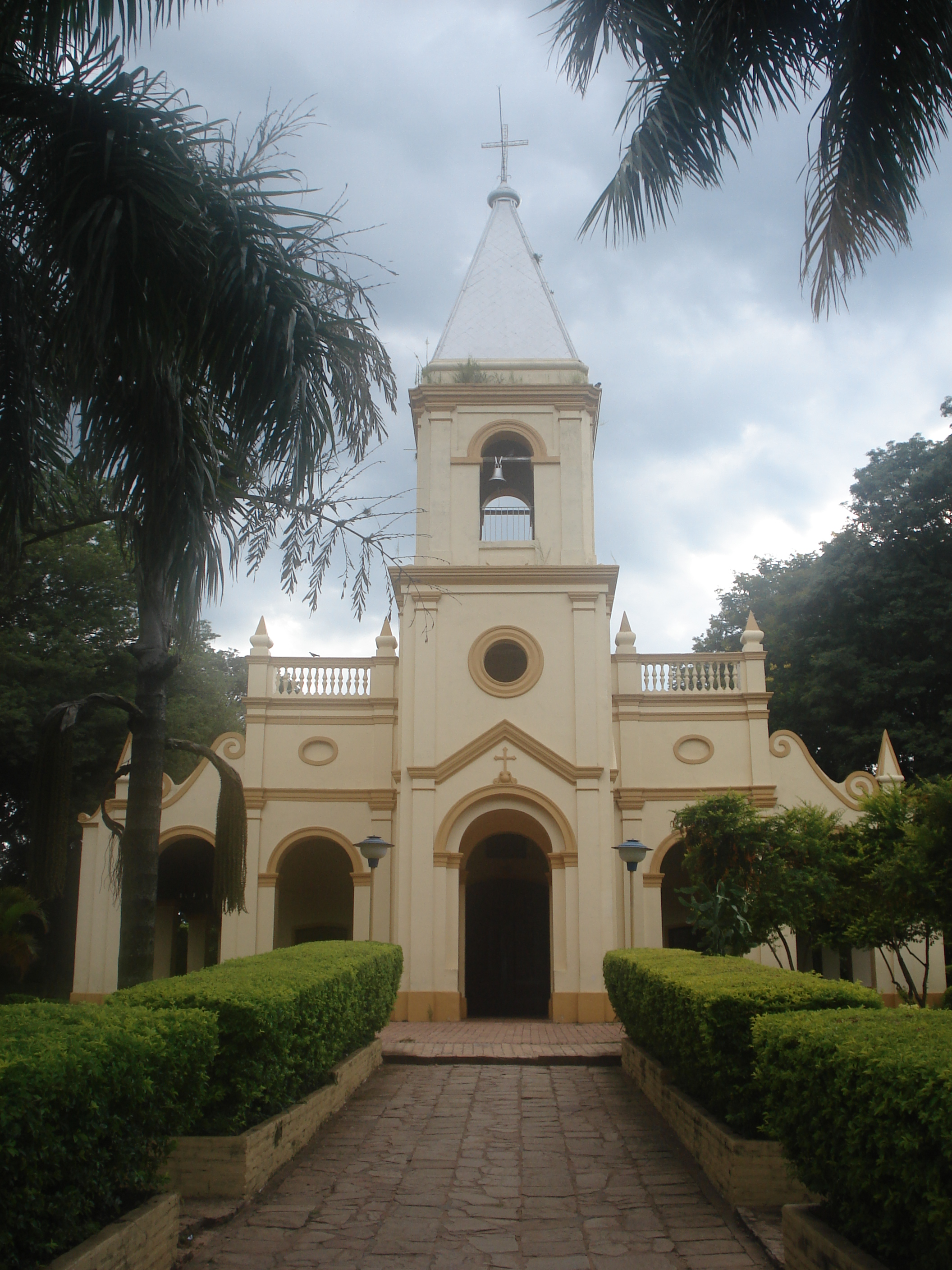
The Church of Limpio

The first Europeans to arrive at the site Spanish conquistadores of the expedition of Juan Ortiz de Zárate in 1575. Franciscan friars Alonso de San Buenaventura and Luis de Bolaños were part of the expeditionary force, who went on to found reductions among the Guaraní tribes that were already occupying the site.

The city was officially founded on February 1, 1785 by Pedro Melo de Portugal.

== Geography ==
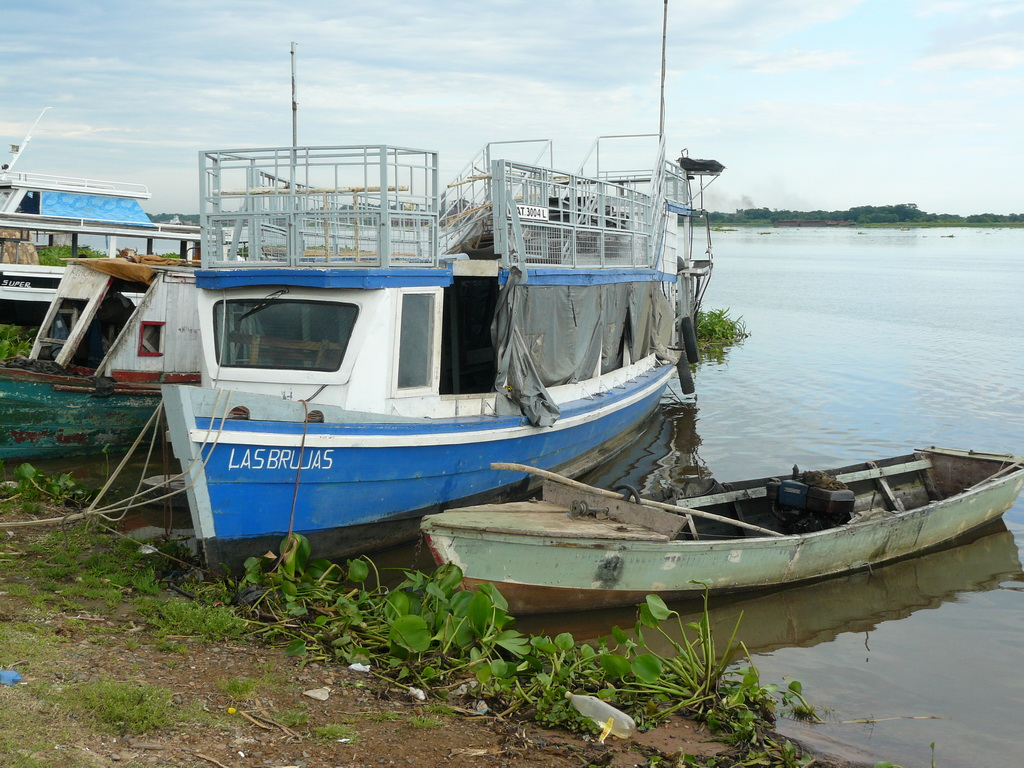
Piquete Cué

With an approximate area of 117 square kilometres (45 sq mi), Limpio is divided into 20 urban and suburban neighborhoods. The city has a port over the Paraguay River named "Piquete Cué" that enables commercial activities.

=== Neighborhoods ===
The district of Limpio consists of 18 neighborhoods.

Barrios de Limpio
N.º	Barrio	N.º	Barrio
1	Isla San Francisco	10	Centro
2	Piquete Cue	11	Paso Correo
3	El Peñón	12	Salado
4	Rincón del Peñón Oeste	13	Montaña Alta
5	Rincón del Peñón Este	14	Mbayué
6	Santa Lucía	15	Aguapey
7	Costa Azul	16	Isla Aranda
8	San Marcos	17	Juan de Salazar
9	Pilar del Norte	18	Isla Aveiro

=== Climate ===
Limpio's climate is classified as warm and temperate. The rainfall in Limpio is significant, with precipitation even during the driest month. The Köppen-Geiger climate classification identifies this particular weather pattern as belonging to the category of Cfa. The average annual temperature in Limpio is 23.1 °C | 73.6 °F. Precipitation here is about 1649 mm | 64.9 inch per year.

Weather by month // weather averages Limpio
	Jan	Feb	Mar	Apr	May	Jun	Jul	Aug	Sep	Oct	Nov	Dec
Min. Temperature °C	24	24	23	20	16	15	13	15	17	20	21	23
Max. Temperature °C	33	32	31	28	24	22	22	25	27	29	30	32

Data: 1991 - 2021 Min. Temperature °C (°F), Max. Temperature °C (°F), Precipitation / Rainfall mm (in), Humidity, Rainy days. Data: 1999 - 2019: avg. Sun hours

The variation in the precipitation between the driest and wettest months is 125 mm | 5 inch. The variation in annual temperature is around 10.7 °C | 19.3 °F. The month that sees the most relative humidity is June (63.17 %). The month with the lowest amount of relative humidity is September (63.17 %). The wettest month is January (12.90 days), whilst the driest is August (6.53).

== Demographics ==
According to the 2022 Paraguayan census, Limpio has a population of 139,652. 73% of its population is urban and 27% rural. Its population growth rate is 8.24% annually over the last ten years. This high population growth rate is a result of the paving of Route 3 and the development of urban social programs.

== Economy ==
The artisan hats of karanday, made in Limpio, are the main activity that the people in Limpio are known for. They also make bags, wide painted hats and other articles out of karanday (palm leaves). Agricultural and cattle production is developed in farms, with cultivation of green vegetables and fruits and also production of milk and its derivative products.

=== Tourism ===
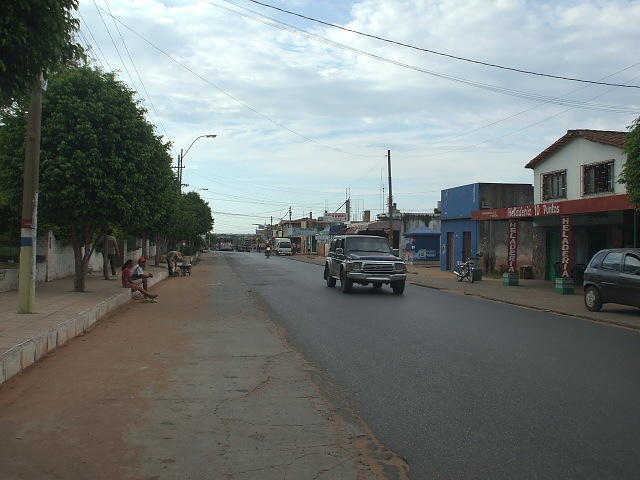
A central street of the city

Among the places that could be visited in Limpio are: the picturesque El Peñón in the Paraguay river, the San Francisco Isle, the old San José Church, the few colonial houses still standing and the famous Piquete Cué port, once one of the most important ports and where the initial trace of the Trans-Chaco Route used to pass.

The elders say that the church in Limpio is over 400 years old, including the altarpieces that amaze with their colorful and exquisite design. Its facade is likely from the time of Carlos Antonio López, who frequented that zone when the Surubi'y stanza (the first of the De la Plata River) was property of his daughter, Inocencia López. Nowadays, the yard of the church displays beautiful vegetation and in the middle of it can be seen the grandiose first ecological sanctuary of the country. Also, the San Francisco Isle, with 15 kilometers long by 6 kilometers wide is considered as an ecological reserve.

== Culture ==
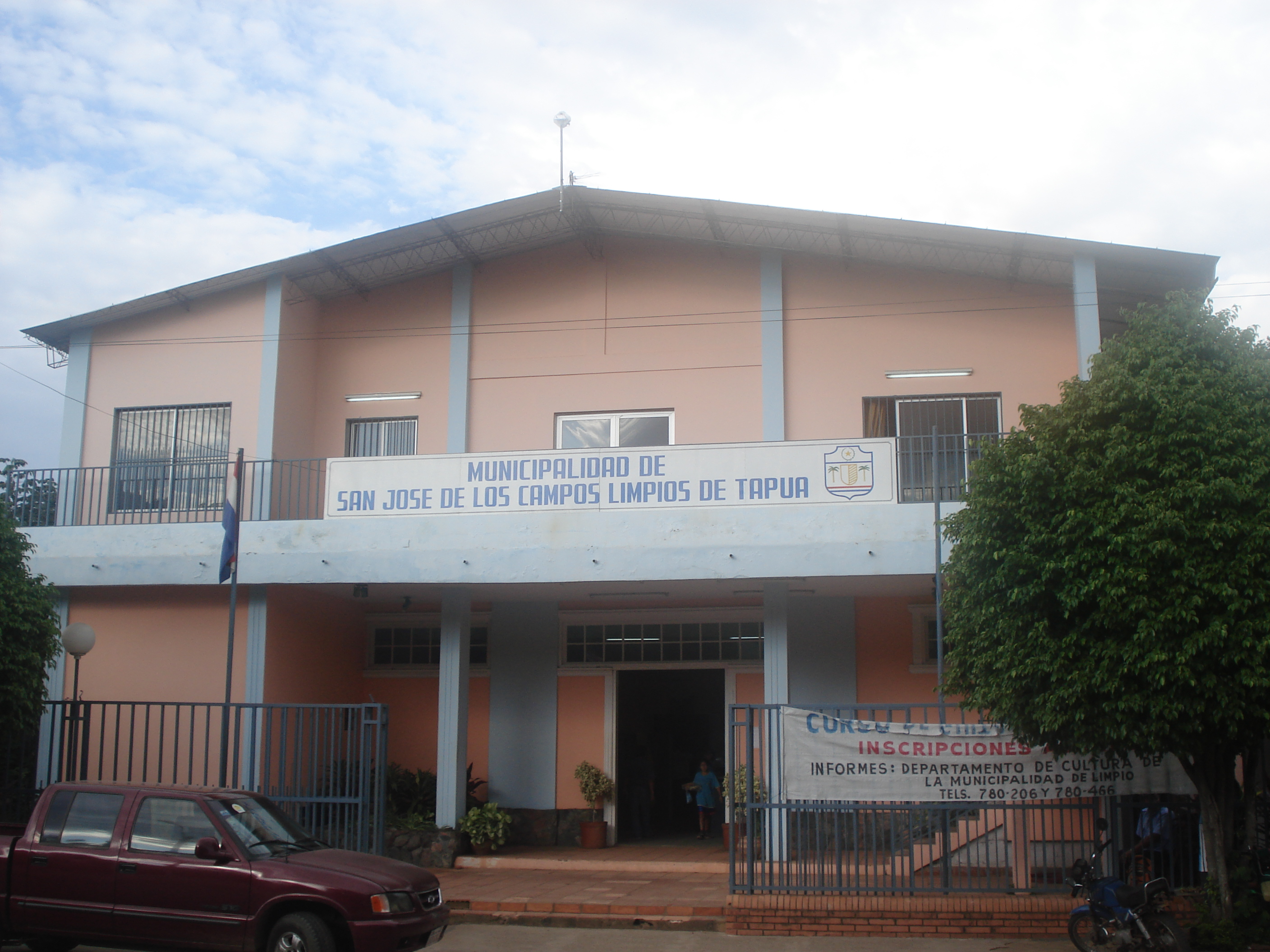
Municipality

The craftsmanship of Limpio is based on the basketmaking and hats made of karanday. It also has the ballets "Karanday Poty" and "Ballet Mainumby". The celebrations honoring Saint Joseph, the saint patron of the city, form a part of the city's culture. Limpio also boasts the fountain of the first ecological sanctuary of the country. Many people gather in this place to refresh themselves with these waters which, according to the popular beliefs, are sacred.

== Notable people ==
- Benigno Ferreira, former President of Paraguay (1906–1908)
- Fernando de la Mora, important personage of the Paraguayan independence.
