= Presidente Franco District =

Presidente Dr. Manuel Franco
- District and city
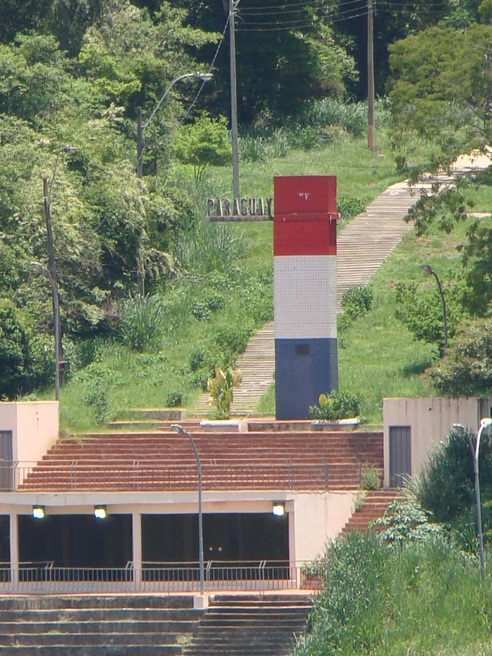
- A tripoint pillar marking Paraguay, in Presidente Franco.

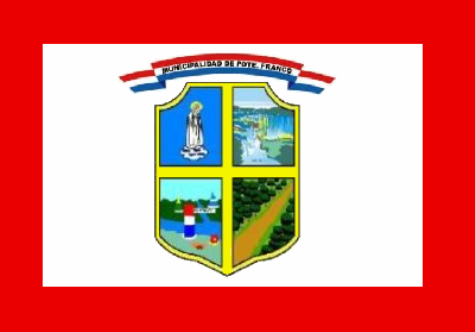
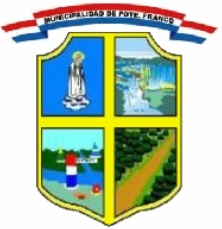
- Flag Seal

- Location of Presidente Franco in Paraguay
- Coordinates: 25°32′S 54°37′W
- Country: Paraguay
- Department: Alto Paraná
- Foundation: October 13, 1929 by Vicente Matiauda

Government
  - Intendente municipal: Roque Godoy
- Elevation: 184 m (604 ft)

Population (2020)
  - Total: 104 677
- Time zone: -4 Gmt
- Postal code: 7700
- Area code: +595 (61)
- Climate: Cfa
- Website: http://www.munifranco.gov.py/

Presidente Franco (also simply known as Franco) is a district and city of the Alto Paraná Department, Paraguay. Aside from being the oldest city in Alto Paraná Department, it is a place of rich exports of fruits and vegetables. Also, Presidente Franco is well known for Saltos del Monday, a 45 m tall and 120 m wide waterfall, Eastern Paraguay.

It is a border port city in Paraguay, located in the eastern sector of the country, along the Paraná River, Alto Paraná Department.

== Etymology ==
City located at the junction of rivers Paraná and Monday, neighbor of Puerto Iguazú, in Argentina, is called the "City of the Three Borders", since there converge the territories of the countries of Paraguay, Brazil and Argentina.

Its name is in honor of Manuel Franco, president of Paraguay in 1918.

== Geography ==
The city is located in the eastern sector of the country, along the Paraná River, Alto Paraná Department.

The Paraná River, one of the most plentiful in the world, offers in Ciudad President Franco scenarios of great beauty.

These attractions water joined several streams and major river Monday, which flow into the Parana but not before forming with its beautiful waters and giant leaps that captivate with their strength and imposing to visitors.

The Interior Atlantic Forest, which once covered the entire territory of Alto Paraná, is kept in large areas of state protection as the Monument Scientific Moses Bertoni, with its rich flora serve as a natural habitat for wild animals indigenous to the area.

The park may also serve to observe animals, birds and to contemplate nature. In their environment, in the region, four indigenous communities are settled. There are 40 families of the Guarani tribe who sell crafts in the museum Bertoni.

=== Weather ===
The average annual temperature is 21 °C, the highest reaches 38 °C and the minimum 0 °C. The highest annual amount of the country in rainfall occurs in the region of Alto Paraná.

== Demography ==
Presidente Franco has a total of 68,242 inhabitants, whom 33,998 are male and 34,245 are women, according to the Directorate General of Statistics, Census and Surveys.

Since the limits of Ciudad del Este and Presidente Franco and are not distinguishable due to population growth in the area, they are integrated into all aspects, economic, educational, health, etc.

President Franco is considered a "dormitory town" because more than half of its residents are active in the labor in Ciudad del Este, departmental capital of Alto Paraná.

== History ==
The city was founded in 1929 by Don Vicente Matiauda, near Ciudad del Este, and constitutes one of the largest ports in the region, especially for transporting timber and mate.

In 1974 it became a municipality of the third category and in 1979 a first-class municipality. After several years of development and population increase, the city became the head of other river ports such as Puerto Indio, Hernandarias, Marangatú and Carlos Antonio Lopez. It became an outstanding commercial center, being near the river port of Encarnación and the major commercial products that came.

President Franco, is a sort of "mother of cities" in the department because it was the first to be founded. Within the district boundaries are two major attractions that are Monument Scientific Moises Bertoni, botanical interest, ethnic and historic and beautiful Saltos del Monday, natural wonder, station Tape Avirú and today the site of adventure sports.

== Economy ==
Because of the variety of trees several sawmills operate in the area. The production of soybeans is also very important. Industry in the city includes dairy factories, oil palm and processing.

== Tourism ==
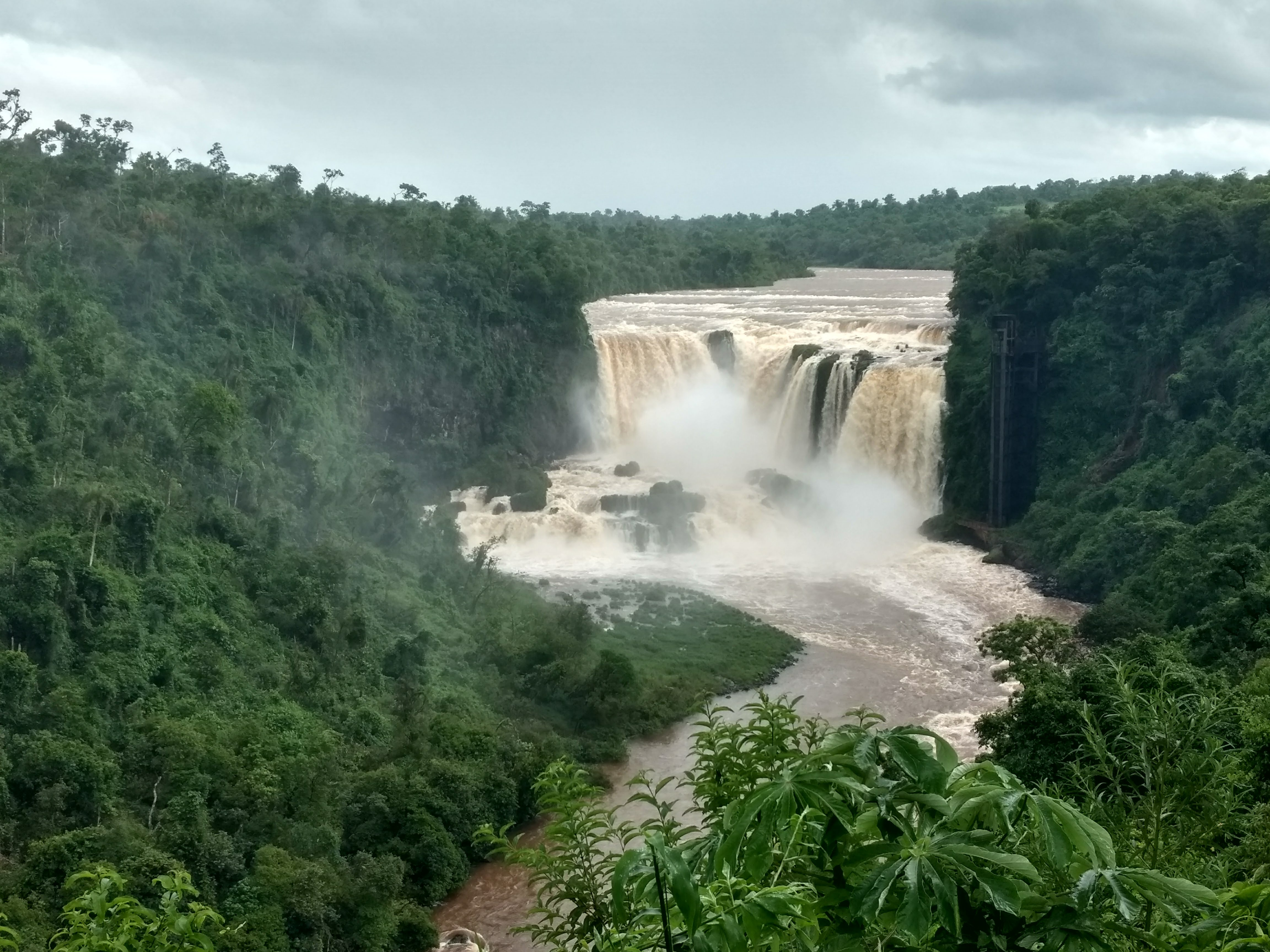
Saltos del Monday, Presidente Franco, Paraguay

Presidente Franco is a rich area on vegetation and wildlife, some of the attractions are:

- Saltos del Monday: remarkable natural landmark - a waterfall, one of the stations prehispánic route of the Guarani. Falls are more than 40 meters high and consist of three main falls and several smaller steps. Falls are located near the mouth of the River Monday, one of the major tributaries of the Paraná River. It is a beautiful spectacle with its white foam and steam caused by the impact of water with rocks and bushes that surround Monday River can be viewed from a system of walkways and viewpoints in a beautiful and well cared natural park.

The park is used by tourists in the region for picnics, hikes and camps. Its nature is its own species of flora and fauna unique characteristics and very representative of the forested region of the former Alto Paraná.

The stone walls are ideal for tourists to be able to practice climbing and rappelling, surrounded by wild foliage, almost virgin to the hand of man. You can hike trails that cut through the park and go up the banks of the river, shortly after the waterfalls.

The beaches near the break are very busy during summer by tourists to placate the heat.

- 'About Paraná River' at the mouth of Iguazu River, "Viewpoint", where can be seen from the boundary pillars in the colors of the three countries. You can cross the river in a raft to reach Argentina.
- 'Museum Moisés Bertoni', a unique place, where they are housed his research work on the Paraguayan rich flora, this museum was recently restored. This protected area has 199 hectares which can be seen in the legacies of wise Bertoni in botany, zoology, meteorology, anthropology and other sciences. It is located on the banks of the Paraná River. Here we guard a small area of the Atlantic forests of the Paraná River; there are some nascent water and waterfalls. There are also essays, agroforest experimental investigations, it is estimated that about 60% of plant species were introduced by Moises Bertoni. The ethnicity Mbya sits north of the region.
- 'Milestone of the Tres Fronteras, 3 km from the city center, on site join the two rivers, Paraguay and Iguaçu and three countries, Paraguay, Brazil and Argentina.

There are parties in March such as Festival of integration and the Brotherhood in the Tres Fronteras.

== How to get there ==
If you are coming from the capital, Asunción, which is 341 km from Presidente Franco, take the National Route 2. If you are coming from Encarnación, take the National Route 6. Presidente Franco is 7 km south of Ciudad del Este, in Eastern Paraguay. There's also a not-paved road from the south, to Los Cedrales.

== Sister cities ==
Presidente Franco is twinned with:

- Puerto Iguazú, Argentina
- Acquarossa, Switzerland
- Florianópolis, Brazil
