= San Lorenzo, Paraguay =

San Lorenzo
- City
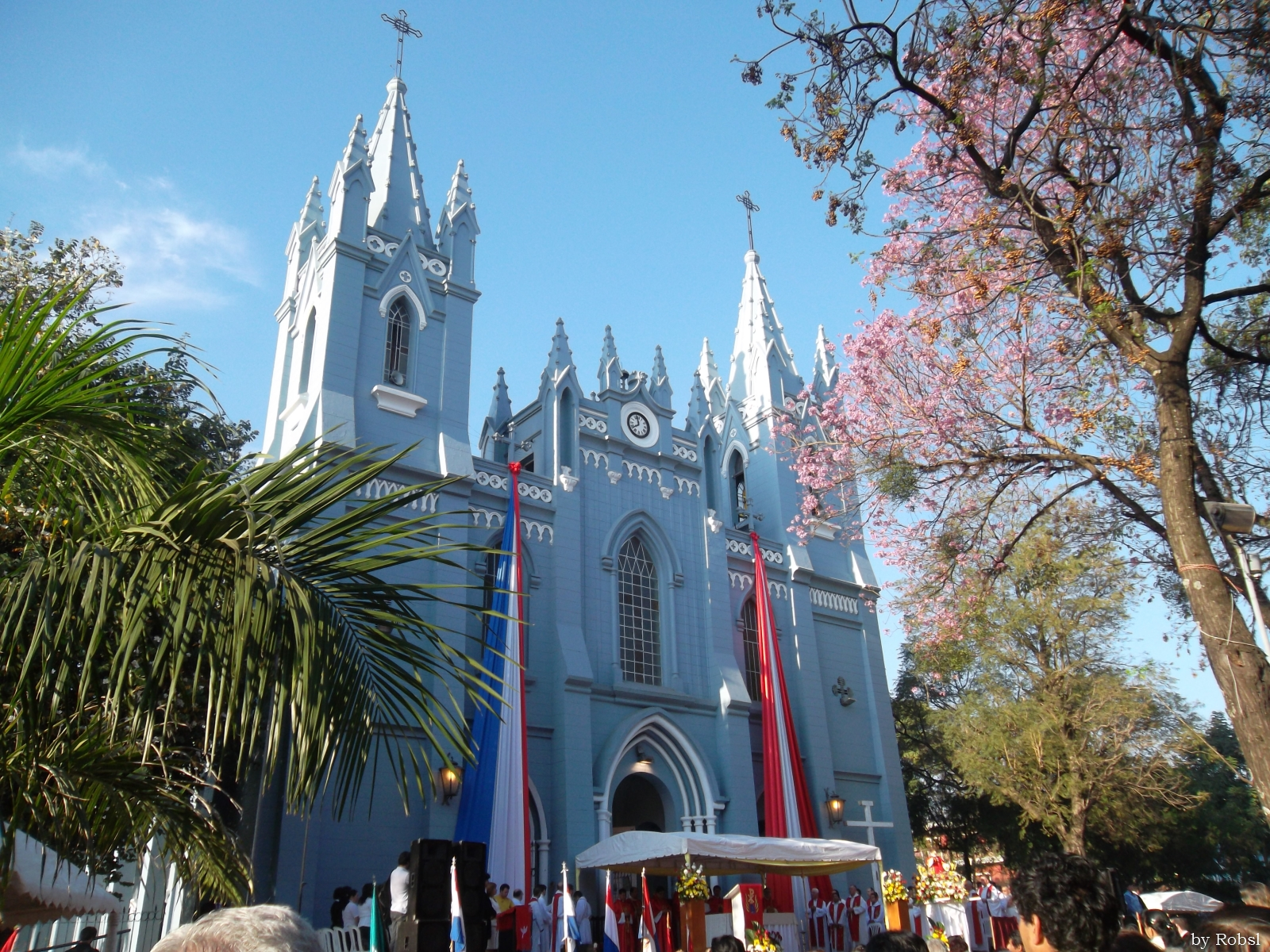
- San Lorenzo Cathedral

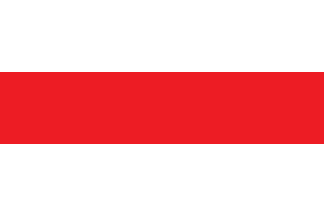
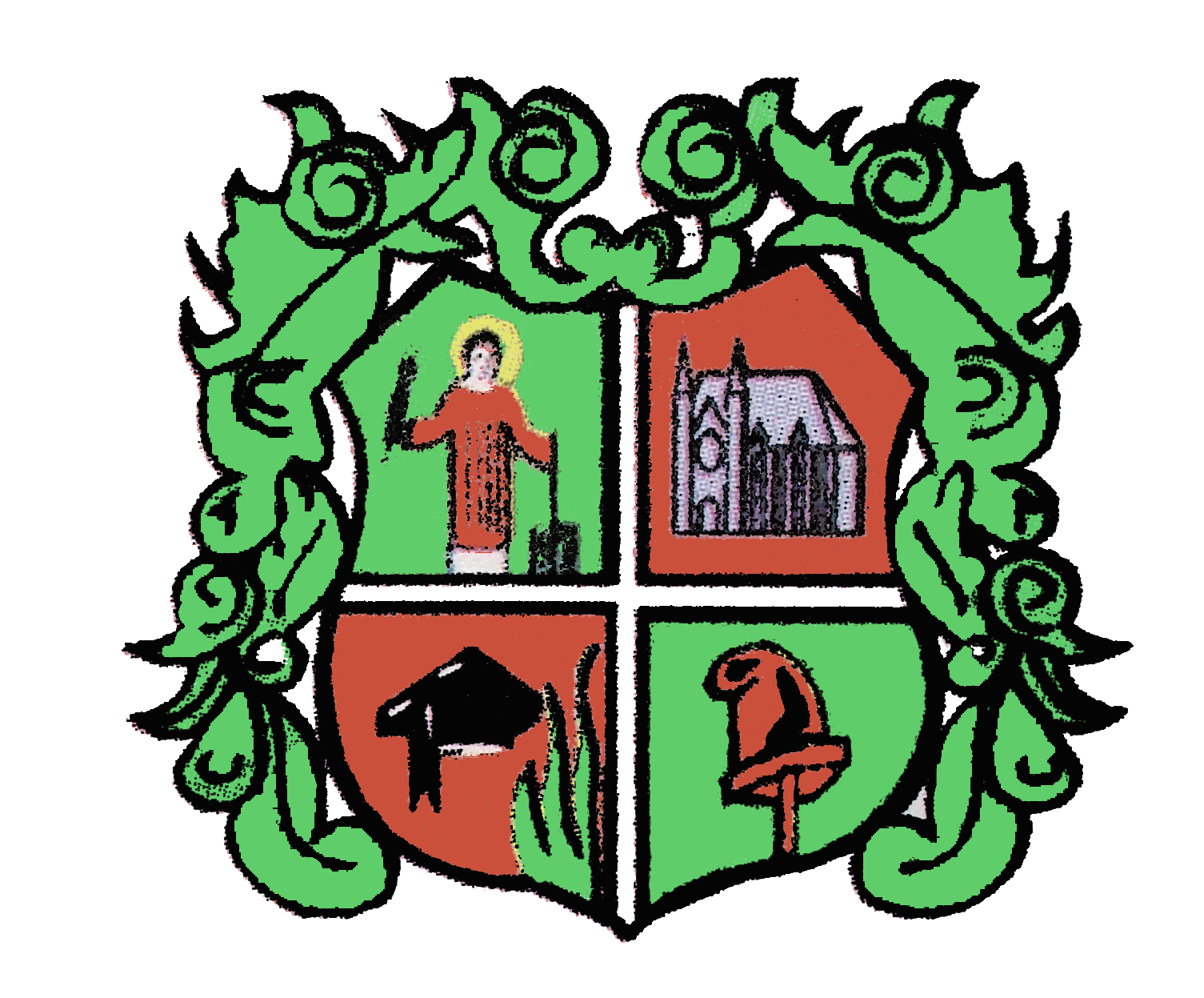
- Flag Coat of arms

- Location within Paraguay
- Coordinates: 25°20′24″S 57°31′12″W
- Country: Paraguay
- Department: Central
- Foundation: August 10, 1775
- Founder: Agustín Fernando de Pinedo

Government
  - Mayor: Alcibiades Quiñonez (ANR)

Area
  - Land: 56 km^{2} (22 sq mi)
- Elevation: 126 m (413 ft)

Population (2016)
  - Total: 252,561
  - Density: 4,623.55/km^{2} (11,974.9/sq mi)
- Demonym: Sanlorenzan
- Time zone: UTC-4
  - Summer (DST): UTC-3
- Postal code: 2160
- Area code: 021
- Climate: Humid subtropical climate
- Website: www.sanlorenzomuni.gov.py

San Lorenzo (Spanish pronunciation: [san loˈɾenso]) is a city in the Central Department in Paraguay. It is a suburb of Asunción, and the third most populous city in Paraguay, with a population of 252,561. The National University of Asunción campus is located in San Lorenzo, that's why it is sometimes known as "Ciudad Universitaria" (University City). The city is the seat of the Roman Catholic Diocese of San Lorenzo.

== History ==
San Lorenzo was originally a Jesuit ranch dedicated to the exploitations of plantations known as Ñu Guazú, which was erected in the 17th century. In 1767 the Jesuits were expelled from the country, and a town was established on August 10, 1775, by Captain Agustín Fernando de Pinedo.

== Geography ==
San Lorenzo is located in the Central Department of Paraguay, about 9km from the capital of the country. It is a part of Gran Asunción. It borders the cities of Luque to the north, Ñemby to the south, Fernando de la Mora to the west, and Capiatá to the east.

- Altitude: 126 meters.
- Latitude: 25° 19' 59" S
- Longitude: 57° 31' 59" W

=== Climate ===
According to the Köppen climate classification, San Lorenzo has a humid subtropical climate (Cfa) with hot summers and mild winters. The average annual temperature is 23 °C. The coldest month is July and the hottest is January. Rainfall occurs greatly throughout the year; only June and July are semi-dry while the other months are rainy.

== Economy ==
San Lorenzo is the most important city for finances, economics, and education of the Central Department. The main economic activities in San Lorenzo are trade and manufacturing. In the main roads of the city, electronics stores, home-appliance stores, Supermarkets, pawn shops, and real estate stores can be observed. The supplies market is also one of the largest in the nation. The main Banks, financial companies, and cooperatives are located in and around the main roads as well.

== Sports ==
The football team is Club Sportivo San Lorenzo, in the Primera División.

== Notable people ==
- Clementino Ocampos (1913–2001), composer
- Orlando Gill (2000), football player
