= Fernando de la Mora, Paraguay =

Fernando de la Mora
- City
- Fernando de la Mora
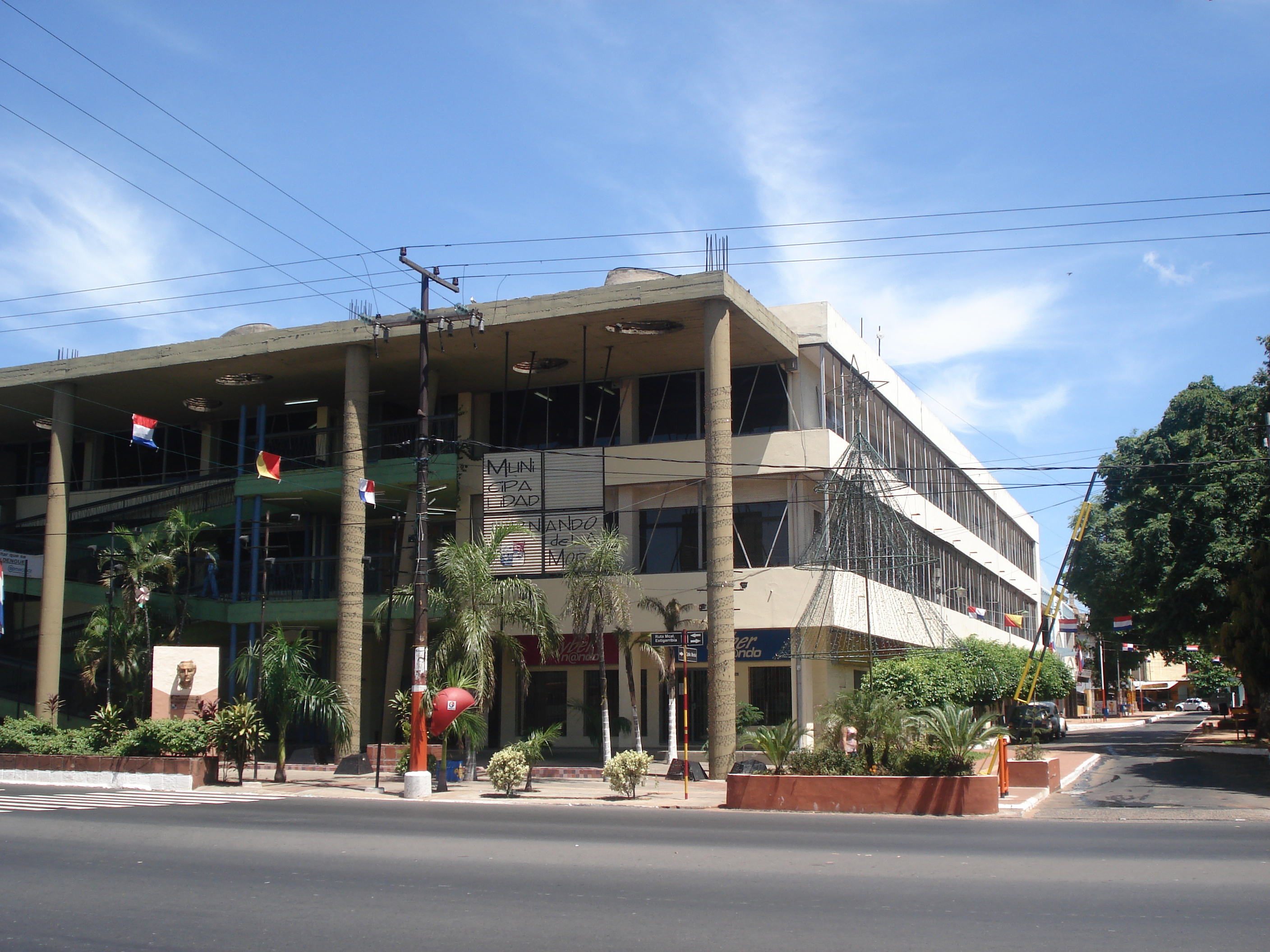

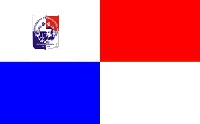
- Flag

- Location in Paraguay
- Coordinates: 25°19′12″S 57°32′24″W
- Country: Paraguay
- Department: Central
- Founded: February 28, 1939

Government
  - Intendente Municipal: Alcides Ramón Riveros Candia (PLRA)

Area
  - Total: 21 km^{2} (8.1 sq mi)
- Elevation: 143 m (469 ft)

Population
  - Total: 110,255
  - Density: 5,300/km^{2} (14,000/sq mi)
- Demonym: Fernandinos
- Postal code: 2300
- Area code: (595)(021)
- Climate: Cfa
- Website: Official website

Fernando de la Mora (Spanish pronunciation: [feɾˈnando ðe la ˈmoɾa]) is a city located in the Central Department, and is part of the metropolitan area of Asunción, Paraguay. It has an estimated population of 110.255 inhabitants according to the 2022 census, making it the tenth most populated city in the country

The city is divided in two areas: the Southern area and the Northern area, divided by the Mariscal Lopez Avenue, with a total surface area of 21 square kilometers. The Northern area has 8 neighborhoods, while the Southern area has 6.

The city features a municipal sports center, a football stadium equipped for national and international matches, 20 public schools, and approximately 30 private schools. Among the public institutions is the Colegio Nacional EMD Dr. Fernando de la Mora, the largest school in the city.

== Toponymy ==
The city was once called Zavala Cue. After 1939, it was renamed to Fernando de la Mora, one of the fathers of Paraguayan independence.

== Demographics ==
This city has a population that is 100% urban. It has 110.255 inhabitants in total, 52.854 men and 57.431 women, according to the 2022 census by the National Institute of Statistics.

It has a population density 74 residents per hectare, and 1402 houses per square kilometer.

The barrio Kamba Cuá is the home of an Afro-Paraguayan community.

== Climate ==
Almost identically to Asuncion, the city experiences a subtropical climate with an average annual temperature of 22 °C. Summer temperatures can reach highs of 40 °C, while winter lows occasionally drop to 0 °C.

Precipitation is abundant throughout the year, averaging over 1,400 millimeters (55 inches) annually. While rain sustains the lush local vegetation, the combination of flat topography, high urban density, and intense summer thunderstorms makes the city highly susceptible to pluvial flooding.

== History ==
Fernando de la Mora was once part of the district of San Lorenzo del Campo Grande and its population dedicated mostly to the farming activity. It was then called Zavala Cué and there were plantations of vegetables and fruit trees, as well as breeding of farm animals. This activity was oriented to satisfy the necessities of Asunción.

Fernando de la Mora was originally known as Zavala Cué, named after a prominent estate in the area belonging to the Zavala family. This property was one of ten large estates established in the region.

Before 1939, the population of Zavala Cué was growing, and the authorities of San Lorenzo del Campo Grande showed no willingness to support the town's separation. It was then that, thanks to the organization of the residents, an independent municipality was created, separate from San Lorenzo del Campo Grande. The request for the creation of the municipality was accepted during the administration of Dr. Félix Paiva, on February 28, 1939.

Since 1950, Fernando de la Mora is an independent district of the Central Department, which now has 18 districts. At the same time, the city experienced significant urban expansion, accompanied by the establishment of industries, laboratories, workshops, and commercial enterprises.

== Economy ==
This city has a relatively large commercial sector; practically nothing is left of the old farming community. Today there are many small and medium industries, especially those that work in the metallurgic and chemical sector.

Fernando de la Mora has developed into a commuter town, with a significant portion of its residents traveling to neighboring Asunción for employment.

== Art and culture ==
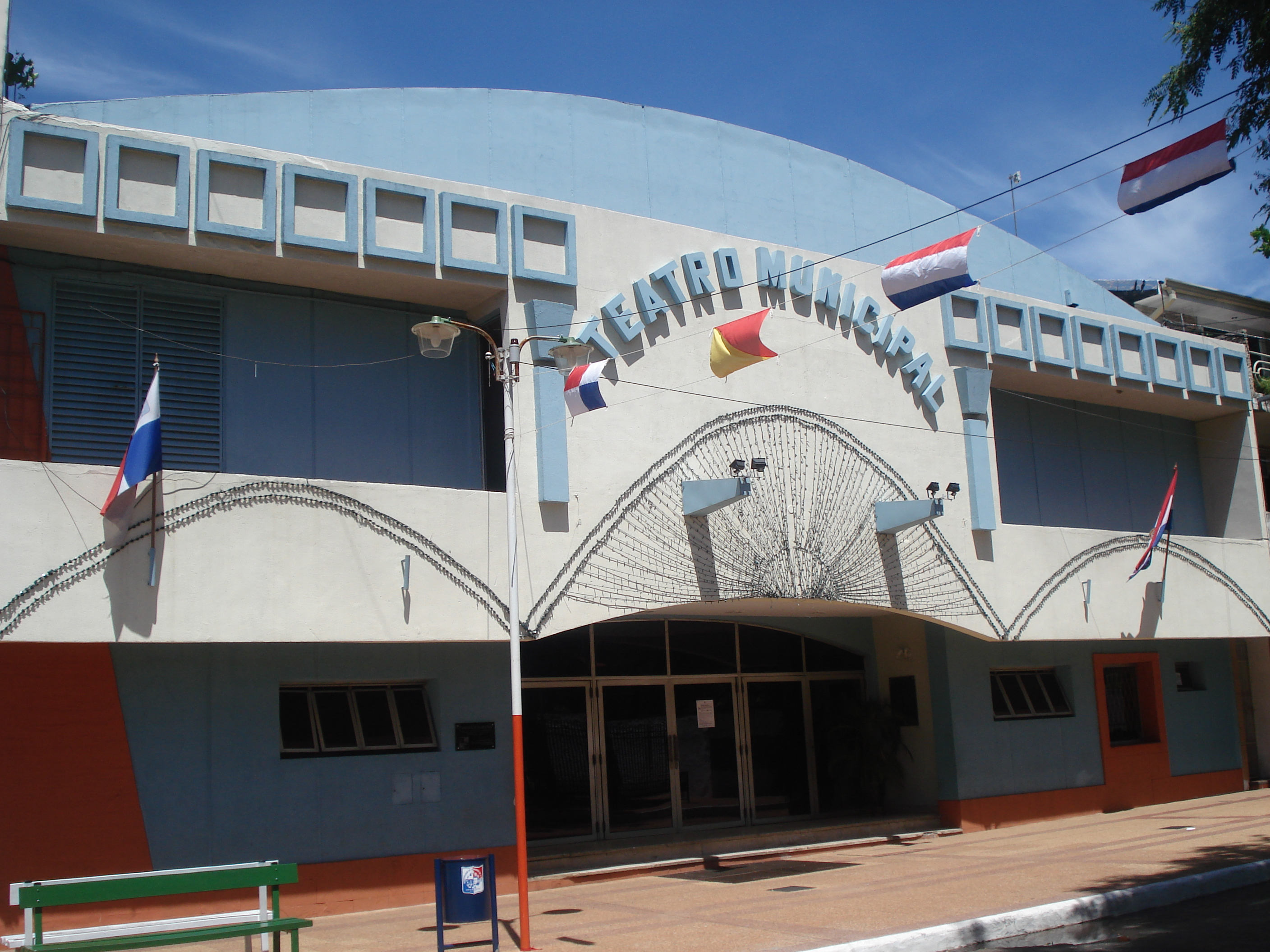
Municipal theater

Fernando de la Mora has a Municipal Theatre located in the center of the city. This cultural center hosts numerous artistic events.

As part of the popular religion, this city celebrates the festivity in honoring the Miraculous Medal (also known as Medal of Our Lady of Graces or the Medal of the Immaculate Conception) every September 27. Another special date is January 6, day of Saint Baltazar, celebrated by the Afro-Paraguayan community.

An historical museum is located in one of the oldest houses in the city, right next to the Municipality building. There are exhibit more than 1300 objects and 100 photographs of the Paraguayan War and the Chaco War. The museum offers guided visits and historical texts specially elaborated for students and other visitors.

=== Parish Church of the Miraculous Medal (Medal of Our Lady of Graces) ===
After the foundation of the city Fernando de la Mora on July 19, 1942, the Parish Church of the Miraculous Medal was founded.

This parish church was built by many people, such as Enrique José Veldman, first priest of the parish church, who wrote the first baptisms registry made in the church, which is currently archived.

The first bell of the church was donated by Teodosia Vda. De Gómez, and the images of the passion, ornaments, stations and the sacrarium were donated by the Florentín Peña family, who brought them from Buenos Aires, Argentina, where they were sent to do diplomatic work.

A commission formed in 1938 was in charge of building the new temple twice as big as the previous one. Part of the first altar had to be knocked down for the enlargement. This work was made by the architect Anderson Castorino.

== Geography ==
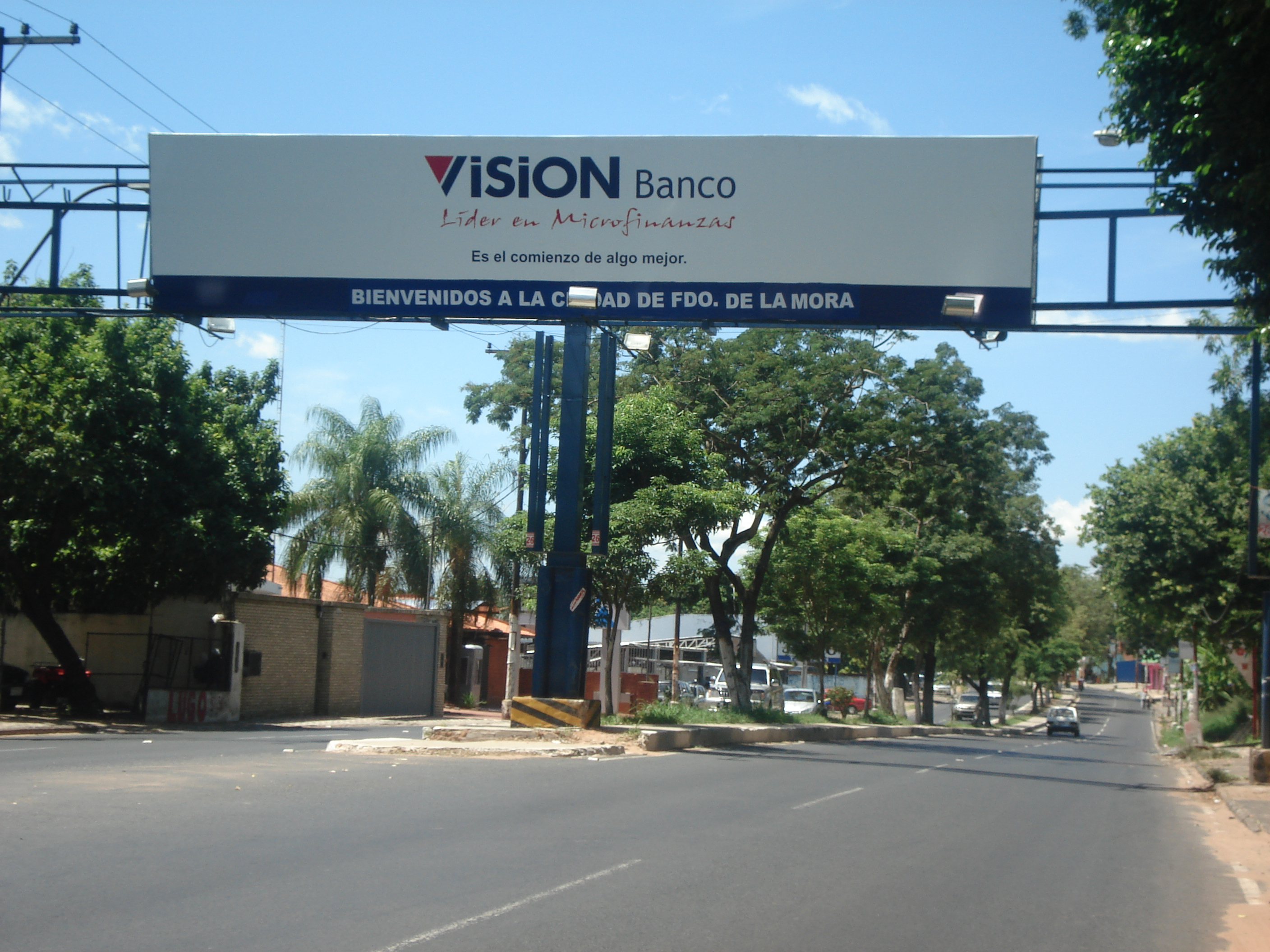
Welcome sign in Fernando de la Mora.

The city shares borders with Asunción to the west, Luque and San Lorenzo to the north, San Lorenzo and Ñemby to the east, and Villa Elisa to the south.

It's connected to Asuncion through the Avenida Eusebio Ayala (PY02). Other main avenues/routes are Avenida Mariscal Lopez (D027), Avenida Defensores del Chaco/Madame Lynch (D066) and Avenida Fernando de la Mora (PY01) which also connects Asunción with Fernando de la Mora.

== Notable people ==
- Fernando Lesme - Paraguayan footballer
- Rafael Lovera - professional boxer
- Edgar Rolón - Paraguayan footballer

== Bibliography ==
- Geografía del Paraguay - Editorial Hispana Paraguay S.R.L.- 1a. Edición 1999 - Asunción Paraguay
- Geografía Ilustrada del Paraguay - ISBN 99925-68-04-6 - Distribuidora Ara
