= San Juan Nepomuceno, Paraguay =

San Juan Nepomuceno
- City
- Location within Paraguay
- Coordinates: 26°07′00″S 55°55′48″W
- Country: Paraguay
- Department: Caazapá
- Founded: November 20, 1797 for Lázaro de Rivera y Espinosa

Government
  - Intendente Municipal: Oscar Derlis Molinas Ruíz (ANR-HC)

Area
  - Total: 1,011 km^{2} (390 sq mi)

Population (2022)
  - Total: 28,233
  - Density: 27.93/km^{2} (72.33/sq mi)
- Time zone: UTC-04 (AST)
  - Summer (DST): UTC-03 (ADT)
- Postal code: 5880
- Area code: (595) (544)

San Juan Nepomuceno is a city and district in the Paraguayan department of Caazapá. It has the largest urban conglomeration of the department.

== Geography ==
It lies 249 km southeast of the national capital city, Asunción, at the terminus of the Blas Garay highway. Blas Garay is a spur of the national highway Number 8 and forks at a crossroads near the town of Ñumí. This district is located in the east of the department and shares borders with six districts of Caazapá (clockwise: N: General Higinio Morínigo, Abaí; E: Tavaí; S: Yuty; W: Buena Vista, Caazapá) and one of the Itapúa (Alto Verá).
