= Miss Grand Paraguay 2025 =

7th Miss Grand Paraguay

CNB Miss Grand Paraguay 2025
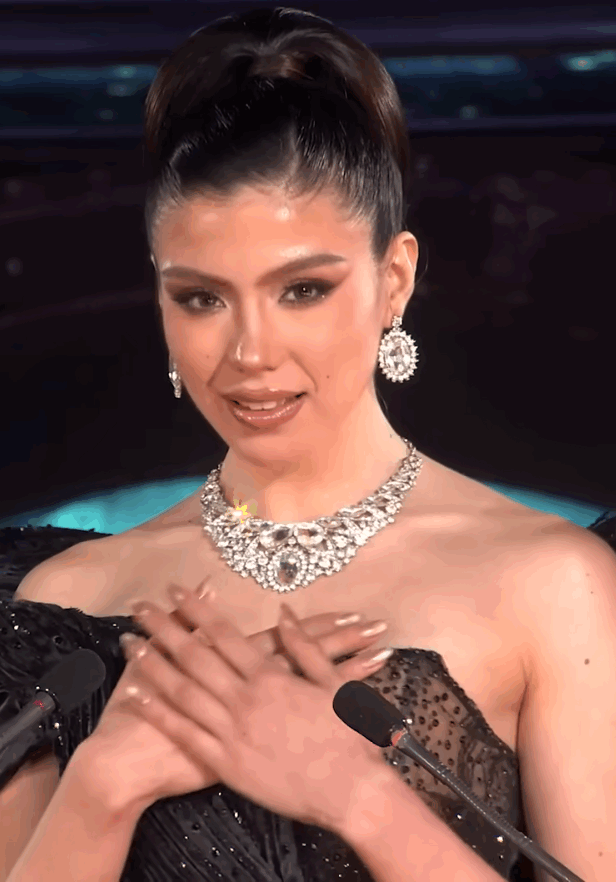
- Cecilia Romero, the winner of the contest
- Date: 30 March 2025
- Venue: Salon de Eventos del Paseo La Galería, Asunción
- Broadcaster: Paraná TV; Youtube
- Entrants: 23
- Placements: 15
- Debuts: Capiíbary; Fulgencio Yegros; Horqueta; Moisés Bertoni; U.N.A.; Villeta; Yegros; Ypané
- Withdrawals: Amambay; Areguá; Canindeyú; Capitán Bado; Fernando de la Mora; General Elizardo Aquino; Itauguá; Limpio; Mariano Roque Alonso; Minga Guazú; Ñemby; Nueva Italia; Nueva Italia (Petite); Paraguayan American; San Antonio
- Returns: Alto Paraná; Caazapá; Presidente Franco
- Winner: Cecilia Romero (Caazapá)
- Congeniality: Carolina Gonzales (San Lorenzo)
- Photogenic: Daihana Medina (Capiíbary)
- Popular Vote: Eliana Penayo Ovelar (Villarrica)

External videos
- Final competition

CNB Miss Grand Paraguay 2025 was the 7th edition of the Miss Grand Paraguay pageant, and the 2nd edition of the Concurso Nacional de Belleza del Paraguay (CNB Paraguay) project, (Note: In the Miss Supranational Paraguay 2024 pageant, the organizer stated "...Ellas son las nuevas soberanas del Certamen Nacional de Belleza del Paraguay 2024, en su primera edición...," which can be translated as "...They are the new queens of the 2024 Paraguay National Beauty Pageant, in its first edition...") held on 30 March 2025. at the Salon de Eventos del Paseo La Galería in Asunción. Candidates from 23 departments and cities of the country competed for the title.

The contest was won by 21-year-old Cecilia Romero of Caazapá, who was crowned by the preceding Miss Grand Paraguay 2024 Sharon Capó of Amambay. Romero will later represent the country in the international parent stage, Miss Grand International 2025, to be held in Thailand on 18 October 2025.

After the crowning of the Miss Grand title, the remaining 11 of the top 15 finalists competed again for the titles of Miss Supranational Paraguay 2025, Miss Cosmo Paraguay 2025, and others.

The event was live transmitted via Paraná TV and the MGM Producciones YouTube channel.

== Background ==
=== Date and venue ===
MGM Producciones, the organizer, stated in December 2024 that Miss Grand Paraguay 2025 was set for February – March 2025, but the exact date remained unrevealed. In addition to the Miss Grand title, the country representatives for the other two international pageants, Miss Supranational and Miss Teen Mundial, will also be named in the event. It was later announced that the pageant grand final would be held on 30 March 2025 at the Salon de Eventos del Paseo La Galería in Asunción.

=== Selection of contestants ===
National finalists for the pageant were either; (1) selected by local organizers entitled by the national committee to elect their regional candidates, or (2) directly chosen by the national organizer through the casting events, then each qualified candidate was later assigned to represent one of the country's administrative divisions.

The following is a list of local preliminary contests for the pageant.

Pageant	Date & Venue	Entrants	Title(s)	Ref.
Miss Grand Ciudad del Este	October 7, 2023, at the Hotel Marambaia, Ciudad del Este	12	Miss Grand Ciudad del Este	
Reina de Asunción	8 December 2023 at the Nobile Suites Excelsior, Asunción	18	Miss Grand Asunción; Miss Grand Itauguá	

== Results ==
=== Placements ===
Miss Grand Paraguay 2025 competition results by department
Color key:
Main winner	Supplemental winners
Virreina	1st runner-up
2nd runner-up	3rd runner-up
Top 15	Unplaced
Withdrew	No representative

Placement		Contestants
Grand category	Miss Grand Paraguay 2025	Caazapá – Cecilia Romero
Grand category	Virreina	Ciudad del Este – Bárbara Vázquez
Grand category	1st runner-up	Presidente Franco – Gabriela Arrellaga
Grand category	2nd runner-up	Fulgencio Yegros – Rocio Cortesi (Note: Later assigned Reina Hispanoamericana Paraguay 2025.)
Grand category	3rd runner-up	Villarrica – Eliana Penayo Ovelar (Note: Automatically qualified for the top 5 finalists after winning the Miss Popular Vote.) (Note: Later assigned Miss Eco Paraguay 2025.)
Supranational category	Miss Supranational Paraguay 2025	Luque – Dahyan Zelinsky
Supranational category	Miss Cosmo Paraguay 2025	Central – Yaninna Jimenez
Supranational category	Virreina	U.N.A. – Micaela Alfonso
Petite category	Reina Internacional Petite Paraguay 2025	Capiíbary – Dahiana Medina
Petite category	Miss Globe Petite Paraguay 2025	Concepción – Marielena González
Petite category	Virreina	Asunción I – Ayelen Mendez
Top 15		Alto Paraná – Avril Mongelos (Note: Later assigned Miss Planet Paraguay 2025.); Horqueta – Melissa Palacio Zalazar; San Lorenzo – Deyanehira Martinez (Note: Later assigned Miss Tourism Paraguay 2025.); Villeta – Jazmin Benitez; Ypané – Yohana Toledo

=== Appointed titles ===
Contestant	Placement at MG Paraguay 2025	Appointed as
Fulgencio Yegros – Rocio Cortesi	2nd runner-up	Reina Hispanoamericana Paraguay 2025
Villarrica – Eliana Penayo Ovelar	3rd runner-up	Miss Eco International Paraguay 2025
Alto Paraná – Avril Mongelos	Top 15	Miss Planet Paraguay 2025
San Lorenzo – Deyanehira Martinez	Top 15	Miss Tourism Paraguay 2025
San Pedro – Andrea Gimenez	Unplaced	Miss Mesoamerica Paraguay 2026/27

=== Special awards ===
Award	Contestants
Miss Congeniality	San Lorenzo – Carolina Gonzales
Miss Popular Vote	Villarrica – Eliana Penayo Ovelar
Miss Photogenic	Capiíbary – Daihana Medina
Miss Top Model	Caazapá – Cecilia Romero
Miss Sports	Moisés Bertoni – Fatima Mendez
Miss Smile	Yegros – Micaela Williams
Miss Face	Central – Yannina Jimenez
Miss Body	Fulgencio Yegros – Rocio Cortesi
Miss Elegence	Luque – Dahyan Zelinsky
Miss Etre Belle	Ciudad del Este – Bárbara Vázquez
Miss Friendship	San Lorenzo – Carolina Gonzales
Miss Social Media	San Lorenzo – Deyanehira Martinez

== Contestants ==
Twenty-three contestants have been confirmed.

Department/District	Contestants	Age	Height
Alto Paraná	Avril Mongelos	20	1.75 m (5 ft 9 in)
Asunción I	Ayelen Mendez	23	1.63 m (5 ft 4 in)
Asunción II	Paz Cáceres	19	1.60 m (5 ft 3 in)
Caazapá	Cecilia Romero	21	1.81 m (5 ft 11 1/2 in)
Capiatá (CE)	Alice Agüero	21	1.63 m (5 ft 4 in)
Capiíbary (SP)	Daihana Medina	19	1.72 m (5 ft 7 1/2 in)
Central	Yannina Jimenez	24	1.73 m (5 ft 8 in)
Ciudad del Este (AA)	Bárbara Vázquez	24	1.65 m (5 ft 5 in)
Concepción	Marielena González	21	1.59 m (5 ft 2 1/2 in)
Fulgencio Yegros (CZ)	Rocio Cortesi	21	1.78 m (5 ft 10 in)
Horqueta (CN)	Melissa Palacio Zalazar	19	1.76 m (5 ft 9 1/2 in)
Luque (CE)	Dahyan Zelinsky	28	1.80 m (5 ft 11 in)
Moisés Bertoni (AA)	Fatima Mendez	26	1.73 m (5 ft 8 in)
Presidente Franco (AA)	Gabriela Arrellaga	20	1.70 m (5 ft 7 in)
San Lorenzo I (CE)	Carolina Gonzales	27	1.73 m (5 ft 8 in)
San Lorenzo II (CE)	Deyanehira Martinez	23	1.67 m (5 ft 5 1/2 in)
San Pedro	Andrea Gimenez (Note: Later assigned Miss Mesoamerica Paraguay 2026/27.)	20	1.75 m (5 ft 9 in)
U.N.A. (CE)	Micaela Alfonso	22	1.69 m (5 ft 6 1/2 in)
Villarrica (GU)	Eliana Penayo Ovelar	26	1.65 m (5 ft 5 in)
Villeta I (CE)	Jazmin Benitez	19	1.72 m (5 ft 7 1/2 in)
Villeta II (CE)	Regina Ferreira	18	1.55 m (5 ft 1 in)
Yegros (CZ)	Micaela Williams	20	1.55 m (5 ft 1 in)
Ypané (CE)	Yohana Toledo	20	1.72 m (5 ft 7 1/2 in)

Withdrawn candidates

- Asunción – Ayelen Pérez
- Fulgencio Yegros (CZ) – Milagros Ferreira
- Itauguá (CE) – Larizza Caballero
- Presidente Franco (AA) – Brenda Salinas
- San Pedro – Margarita Ramírez
