= Maciel, Paraguay =

Maciel
- District
- Location within Paraguay
- Coordinates: 26°11′00″S 56°28′20″W
- Country: Paraguay
- Department: Caazapá
- Founded: December 17, 1892

Government
  - Intendente Municipal: Amadeo Alberto Ledesma Ortiz (ANR)

Area
  - Total: 457 km^{2} (176 sq mi)

Population (2002)
  - Total: 3,957
  - Density: 8.66/km^{2} (22.4/sq mi)
- Time zone: UTC-04 (AST)
  - Summer (DST): UTC-03 (ADT)
- Area code: (595) (5428)

Maciel is a district located in the north western part of the Caazapá Department of Paraguay.

== Location ==
The district is located in the north western part of the department and shares border with two districts of Caazapá (Caazapá and Doctor Moisés S. Bertoni), one of the Paraguarí Department (Mbuyapey) and two of the Guairá Department (Borja and Iturbe).

== Population ==
At the 2002 census Maciel had a population of 3,957, an increase of 0.4% since 1992.

== How to get here ==
It is located only 10 km away from the city of Caazapá, where one can get taking the national route number 8.
