= Aché =

Indigenous people of Paraguay

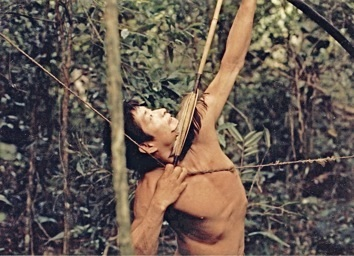
- Aché man aiming into the canopy

Total population
- 1,500

Regions with significant populations
- Paraguay

Languages
- Aché, Spanish

Religion
- traditional tribal religion

The Aché (/ɑːˈtʃeɪ/ ah-CHAY) are an Indigenous people of Paraguay. They are hunter-gatherers living in eastern Paraguay.

From the earliest Jesuit accounts of the Aché in the 17th century until their peaceful outside contacts in the 20th century, the Aché were described as nomadic hunter-gatherers living in small bands and depending entirely on wild forest resources for subsistence. In the 20th century, four different ethnolinguistic populations of Aché were contacted and pacified. They are the Northern Aché, the Yvytyruzu Aché, the Ypety Aché, and the Ñacunday Aché. Each of these populations was an endogamous dialectal group, consisting of multiple residential bands, with no peaceful interaction between the groups.

The Aché suffered repeated abuses by rural Paraguayan colonists, ranchers, and big landowners from the conquest period until the latter half of the 20th century. In the 20th century, largely under military dictator Alfredo Stroessner, the Northern Aché, who had been the only inhabitants of nearly 20,000 square kilometers of rural Paraguay, ended up confined on just two reservations totaling little more than 50 square kilometers of titled land. In the process, they were massacred, enslaved, and gathered onto reservations where no adequate medical treatment was provided. This process was specifically carried out to pacify them, and to remove them from their ancestral homeland, so that absentee investors (mainly Brazilian) could move in and develop the lands that once belonged only to the Aché. Large multinational business groups—e.g. La Industrial Paraguaya. S.A. (LIPSA)—obtained title rights to already occupied lands and then sold them sight unseen to investors, who purchased lands where Aché bands had roamed for thousands of years, and were still present. The fact that Aché inhabitants were present and living in the forests of Canindeyu and Alto Paraná on the very lands being titled in Hernandarias seems to have been dismissed by cities such as Coronel Oviedo.

The Kuetuvy Aché were forcibly removed from the Mbaracayu region in the 1970s, but managed to return to their ancestral homeland in 2000.

== Name ==
The Aché are also known as the Axe people. In the past they have been called the Guaiaqui, Guayakí, Guayaki-Ache, and Guoyagui by Guaraní-speaking neighbors and by early anthropologists, however, these terms are now considered derogatory.

The earliest published reports (Lozano 1873-74 summary of Jesuit accounts in the 17th century) about the Aché refer to them as "Guajagui", a term based on the Guaraní root "Guaja" (= enemy tribe, or brother-in-law) and "gui" a common Aché suffix (meaning "essence of" or "having the property of").

== Language and genetics ==
The Aché language provides clues to their origin. Current analysis suggests that it has a Tupí-Guaraní lexicon, overlaid on a unique grammatical structure not found in sister Guaraní languages.

Genetic analyses suggest that the Aché are a group of mixed biological origin containing about 60 to 65% Tupí-Guaraní genes, and 35 to 40% of genes with affinities to the Macro-Ge (also known as Jé) language family.

The Aché are also culturally and phenotypically distinct from the neighboring Guarani. Early descriptions of the Aché emphasized their white skin, light eye and hair color, beards, and Asiatic features as identifying characteristics. Their subsistence practices and technology were considered extremely simple, and nomadism made them secretive and evasive.

== History ==
The first archaeological evidence of native peoples in Paraguay is represented by the "Altoparanense industry" of stone flaked tools found along the Paraná River, and Celt-type stone axes similar to those still used by the Aché of the same region (and dated to about 9,000 Before Present). About 500 CE Guarani horticulturists migrated into the area and began to persecute the Aché hunting peoples, perhaps causing them to move into forested hills, away from open country and navigable rivers, and adopt a more nomadic lifestyle.

Written history relevant to the Aché begins with the founding of Asunción in 1524. A few years later, in 1554, a small village (Guaira) was founded by the Spanish on the Parana river near the site of modern-day Guaira, Brazil. Fr. Luis de Bolaños arrived in Paraguay 1575, mastered the Guarani language and founded 18 Guarani villages in the province of Guaira between 1580 and 1593. Evidence of groups in Eastern Paraguay that might have been Aché comes from the earliest Jesuit archives around 1620. Non-Guarani groups that lived from hunting and gathering were often referred to as Caaygua or Caigua (Kaingang groups from the Southern Je language family). Descriptions of some Caaigua match fairly well with 20th-century descriptions of the Aché. For example, Techo (1897) describes them as hunter-gatherers who ate only palm pith and fruits, venison and roots, and fastened little stones to their lips, which made them look ferocious, and he states that they worshipped only thunder. This is congruous with the Aché, whose economy is indeed based on palm pith and meat, and whose spiritual beliefs place "Berendy" (associated with booming meteors) in a central position. Lozano (1873) provides a seven-page early description of the Aché (whom he called "Guayagui"), using a summary of Jesuit archives from the 17th century. This description includes accurate information about the Aché economy, social organization, culture and belief system. Lozano and Techo also described how some Aché bands were captured near the mouth of the Acaray river in the 1630s, and forcibly brought to a Guarani Mission. That group of Aché captives all perished from disease within a few months.

After the expulsion of the Jesuits in 1768, there is no further information about the Aché until the end of the 19th century and early 20th century, when several writers related the knowledge of local Paraguayan populations concerning the Aché, but none observed them directly. These included reports by several foreign scientists as well as the renowned Paraguayan naturalist Moises Bertoni (whose information about the Aché was published posthumously). Finally, a German immigrant, Federico Maynthusen contacted a group of Aché in 1908, in the modern department of Itapua, and published information on both their language and culture.

=== Contact ===
In 1959, after decades of persecution, the Ypety Aché were contacted in modern-day Caazapa and pacified by Manuel de Jesus Pereira. Pereira then used Ypety Aché guides to track down, contact and pacify the Yvytyruzu Aché in the Guairá Department in 1963. Both groups together numbered only about 100 individuals when contacted. Between 1963 and 1968 more than half of the Aché that had been recently pacified perished from disease while under Pereira's supervision. During this time, the Ypety and Yvytyruzu Aché were studied and described by anthropologists Branislava Sušnik, Leon Cadogan, and Pierre Clastres. Prior to the 1960s, most ethnographic studies of the Aché were based primarily on captured Aché children.

By the 1960s the Northern Aché were the last large uncontacted ethnic group in Paraguay, but they were constantly persecuted by colonists, loggers, and ranchers. Paraguay, like other Latin American countries, had a long colonial history of Indian enslavement that continued well after the official prohibition of slavery in 1869. Aché bands were systematically raided with the intention of killing the men, and capturing the women and children. A slave trade developed in Paraguay where Aché children were sold openly in the region as late as the 1970s. Chilean entomologist, Luis Pena, reported in 1971 on the slave trade at San Juan Nepomuceno (near the Paraguayan capital), writing that a child could be bought for between $18-$72. The "pacification" of the Northern Aché has been labeled as genocide by some writers (e.g., Munzel 1973, 1974, 1976). On 8 April 2014, the Aché presented a complaint of genocide against their people during the military government of Alfredo Stroessner in an Argentinian court.

Because of increasing hostile encounters with Northern Aché during the construction of the new Saltos de Guaira road in the mid-1960s, Manuel Pereira moved with the Ypety and Yvytyruzu Aché to a site called "Cerro Moroti", in modern Caaguazú District, in order to track down and pacify the Northern Aché. At that time the Northern Aché still ranged free over a huge region from San Joaquin mountains to the Paraná River, and from the Acaray River north to the Mbaracayu Mountains, and there were approximately 560 individuals in the population. Pereira was encouraged to pacify this group and remove them from the area.

In October 1970, several Aché from the Cerro Moroti reservation were attacked while hunting. They routed their attackers using newly acquired shotguns, and captured a Northern Aché woman who was taken back to Cerro Moroti. Within a month the captured Northern Aché woman led Pereira's reservation Aché to her forest band, and the group was persuaded to move to the Cerro Moroti reservation in order to receive protection from "Papa Pereira". This "surrender" was accomplished peacefully because many of the Yvytyruzu Aché living at Cerro Moroti had known and were related to members of this Northern Aché band (the two groups had only been separated in the late 1930s when the road to Ciudad del Este was constructed).

Between 1971 and 1978, at least ten different contact and extraction events of forest-dwelling Northern Aché took place. A high percentage of those taken to the Cerro Moroti government sponsored reservation (named officially the "Colonia Nacional Guayaki") died from respiratory epidemics within two years after first peaceful contact. In addition, several large bands fled from contact and suffered almost total mortality in the forest. Detailed demographic data on the Northern Aché population (based on extensive interviews with survivors) shows that 38% of the population died from contact related respiratory disease during this time period. This included 68 individuals who ran away from contact and died in the forest, 131 individuals who died at reservation/mission settlements between 1971 and 1978, and 49 individuals that were kidnapped by Paraguayans during the contact process and never seen again.

=== Aftermath ===
The post-contact history of the Northern Aché begins with chaos at Cerro Moroti following the arrest of Manuel Pereira, and the newly appointed administration of the New Tribes missionaries in September 1972. Small groups left the reservation almost every day and dispersed along the new road from Santa Rosa Cue to the Carapa river. Many joined Pereira after his release for a short time at Ybyrycua, and then left again. Some re-entered the forest, and many were persuaded or coerced to stay on as laborers in small Paraguayan settlements and isolated rural houses.

The situation changed dramatically in 1974–75, when Father Nicolas de Cunha began to systematically bring the surviving Aché refugees to the Catholic Mission San Agustín. This settlement began on the Carapa River, but then moved to borrowed land on Arroyo Manduvi near Laurel, Alto Paraná. The Manduvi group was under the direction of Padre Alejandro Pytel, and in 1978, after Padre de Cunha died suddenly, Pytel convinced the Verbo Divino order to purchase new land for a permanent mission. The entire Manduvi group moved to a new mission, located at Chupa Pou in August 1978.

For the next 20 years, the Chupa Pou mission grew into the largest Aché settlement in Paraguay, while the Colonia Nacional in Cerro Moroti decreased in size, lost most of its original land holdings, and increasingly intermixed and intermarried with the neighboring Paraguayans.

Following the original dispersal from Cerro Moroti, several more Aché communities were formed over the next 25 years. First, in 1976, the missionary family of Rolf Fostervold contacted and protected the Ynaro/Ñacunday Aché that were on the verge of extermination. This settlement, called Puerto Barra, was located at the confluence of the Ynaro and Nacunday rivers at an old sawmill. Then, soon afterwards, a group of Southern Aché and their affines and associates left Cerro Moroti to found a new colony near the traditional home range of the Ypety Aché. This settlement, located in the state of Caazapa, is referred to as Ypetymi (also Tupa Renda).

Next, in the early 1980s a dozen families from the Chupa Pou reservation left to join the Aché band that had been contacted in the Refugio Mbaracayú (Mbaracayu Biological Sanctuary) in April 1978, and was living at a German Mission for Guarani Indians. The Aché separated from the Guarani, and formed the community now called Arroyo Bandera, at the edge of the Mbaracayu Forest Reserve.

Finally, twenty years after its formation, the Chupa Pou community fissioned, resulting in the colony now called "Kue Tuvy".

Currently there are six legally recognized Aché communities: Cerro Moroti; Ypetimi, Puerto Barra; Chupa Pou; Kuetuvy; and Arroyo Bandera. The Chupa Pou reservation is the largest of these and also the main center of the Northern Aché sub-group. The Chupa Pou Aché consist of approximately 80 families residing south of Villa Ygatimi along the Jejui Guasu river. Arroyo Bandera is located directly west of the main entry to the Mbaracayu Reserve (15 km north of Ygatimi), and had 148 inhabitants (about 30 families) in January 2006. The most recent Northern Aché community is that of Kuetuvy, which had 205 residents (about 55 families) in January 2006, and is located directly south of the Mbaracayu Reserve, on the property designated as "Finca 470".

=== The Kuetuvy Aché ===
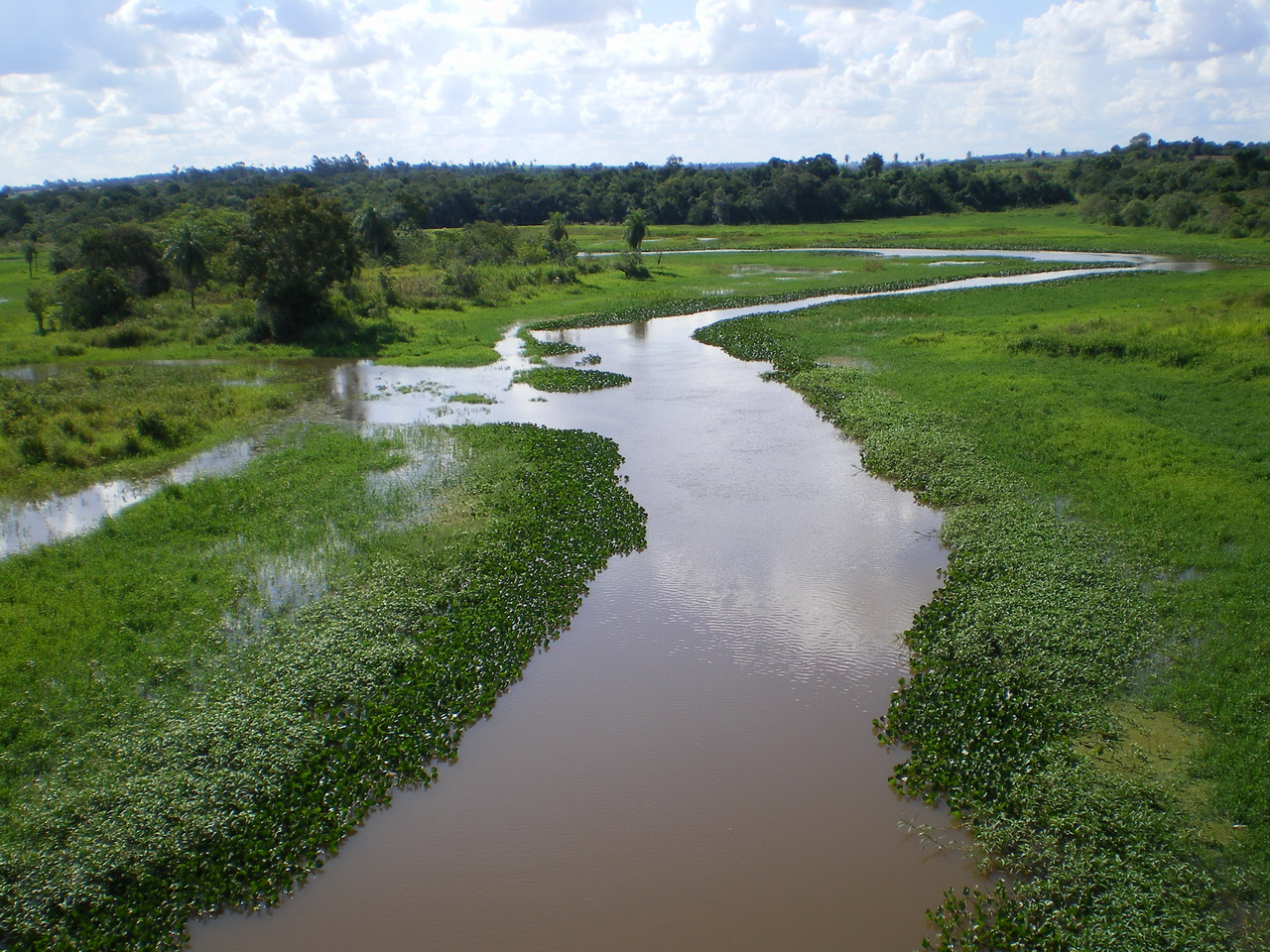
Mbaracayú Biological Sanctuary

In 1991 the legal decree creating the Mbaracayu Forest Reserve (MFR) recognized the MFR as the Northern Aché traditional territory and gave the Aché permanent hunting and collecting rights inside the reserve. The Kuetuvy Aché are descendants of bands that were extracted from the MFR, and surrounding regions in 1972–74. This group separated from the Chupa Pou Aché on March 8, 2000 because of disagreements about resource use on the Chupa Pou reservation. In that dispute Kuetuvy leaders chastised the Chupa Pou leaders for selling timber in an uncontrolled fashion and cutting more forest than was necessary for subsistence. The Kuetuvy Aché announced their intention to move back to their traditional homeland (Finca #470) and began the process of soliciting expropriation of the property. They resided just south of the Finca #470 property with the Guarani Indian community of Takua Poty and waited for permission to occupy Finca #470. On December 11, 2000 (resolution 521/00) they received official recognition as a community by the Paraguayan Indigenous Institute (INDI). Then on June 25, 2001 the Kuetuvy community received status as a legally recognized entity in Paraguay ("personería juridica" decreto no. 13527).

Initially the Fundacion Moises Bertoni (FMB) intended to purchase Finca #470 from its Taiwanese owner with funds raised in the US, Taiwan, and other foreign countries and then transfer the title of the property to the Kuetuvy Aché as an "Indigenous Forest Reserve". In June 2000, Alberto Yanosky, then acting director of the FMB, made a verbal agreement with Kuetuvy leaders as to the conditions under which the FMB would purchase and transfer the property to the Aché. The agreement between Kuetuvy and the FMB included the development of a sustainable management plan and a promise not to cut more than 5% of the forest on the property for residential areas and agriculture. The Aché proposed these conditions and pledged to sign a binding agreement to that effect. The FMB carried out an evaluation of the property and made a purchase offer in late 2000. The Taiwanese property owner accepted the FMB offer to purchase the property on January 15, 2001.

But, in the months following the initial agreement between the FMB and the Kuetuvy Aché, the Paraguayan Ministry of Public Works (Ministerio de Obras Públicas) and the Secretary of the Environment (Secretaría del Ambiente) began negotiating independently with the property owner to purchase Finca #470 as part of a conservation land quota required by the Interamerican Development Bank (Banco Interamericano de Desarrollo – BID) in order to meet conditions for a BID loan for the route 10 project in Canindeyu. During that negotiation the owner of Finca #470 notified the FMB that he was no longer interested in selling the property to any NGO. When the Kuetuvy leaders discovered that the Paraguayan government intended to purchase the property as part of a conservation easement plan, they immediately presented a formal "request" for expropriation to the Paraguayan National Indian Institute (INDI) and the Secretary of Environment (SEAM).

In January 2001 clandestine loggers working for Brazilian sawmills began a massive invasion of Finca #470 aided by "landless peasants" who promised to protect them if they cleared roads and allowed for subsequent settlement on the property. The loggers were evicted in December 2001 and the landless peasants were permanently removed in July 2002 after armed Aché warriors patrolled the southern boundary of the territory.

Between July 2001 and late 2003 Aché leaders attended dozens of meetings with representatives of Paraguayan government agencies (INDI, SEAM, Oficina de la Procuradoría de la Nación) and NGO's (Fundacion Moises Bertoni, World Wildlife Fund, Avina, PROSAM) interested in supporting their claim to Finca #470. All representatives of both government agencies and NGOs assured the Aché that the land would be titled to them once expropriated by the Paraguayan government. In early January 2002 the Aché received a letter of permission to occupy Finca #470 from the Secretary of the Environment, and the Kuetuvy Aché permanently settled the property on January 8, 2002.

In June 2002, the Aché began systematic conservation work on the Finca #470. An Aché resource management team trained by Kim Hill performed partial forest inventory and animal density counts on Finca #470 using random transect methodology. During that month the Aché management team also did two aerial overflights of the property with GPS receivers and detailed maps.

During June–July 2002 there was a second attempted invasion of the property by so-called "landless peasants". Aché leaders called the national press, several government officials, and organized a show of armed resistance which was attended by representatives of all six Aché reservations. Over 200 armed (with bow and arrow) warriors stood along the border of the property near the campsite of the would-be peasant invaders.

=== Finca # 470 as the Kuetuvy Indigenous Reserve ===
On July 24, 2003 the political leaders of Kuetuvy gathered their community and all adult members signed a document requesting INDI to obtain legal title to the Finca 470 property from SEAM and transfer the title to the Aché community. On Feb 10, 2004 religious and political leaders from Kuetuvy met directly with President Nicanor Duarte Frutos at "Mburuvicha Roga" and were assured by the Paraguayan President that they would receive title to Finca #470.

The Aché indicated that they would manage the property as an "Indigenous Reserve" and requested technical assistance in order to develop a sustainable management plan. They proposed to conserve a large area of forest where activities would include sustainable hunting, collection of edible fruits and insects, collection of medicinal plants, enrichment of the forest with commercially valuable native tree species such as Yerba Mate, and minimal impact forestry based on long cycle rotation and low-impact harvest and transport. The forestry-based products would be primarily destined for internal consumption in the form of houses, school buildings, clinics, etc. The Secretary of Environment (SEAM) responded with support for the Aché proposal and signed an Agreement of Inter-institutional Cooperation for five years with the Paraguayan Indian Institute (INDI) and the Aché leaders on September 2, 2004.

The first clause of the agreement states that "... the purpose of this agreement is to cede temporary use rights of the SEAM property called Finca 470, in the District of Ygatimi, Department of Canindeyú, to INDI with the ultimate intention that the Aché Indigenous Community of Kuetuvy can continue their customary subsistence activities, in agreement with principles of nature conservation. This is done, taking into account that the Finca 470, object of this agreement, is a forestry reserve of biological and botanical resources, considered part of the 'lungs' of the Atlantic Interior Forest, and located inside the buffer zone of the Mbaracayu Forest Reserve. In this way we hope to establish mechanisms to guarantee the joint process of transferring land rights of the Finca 470 to the native peoples located in that place, and in observance with the National Constitution and laws 352/94, 904/94, and 234/93".

In March 2005 the Aché presented a management plan for Finca 470 to SEAM and on May 3, 2005 the Secretary of the Environment responded to the leader of the Aché community, Margarita Mbywangi in note 291/05.

That document from SEAM expressed agreement with the terms of the Aché management plan of March 29, 2005 (stamped as received by the SEAM document #33084). SEAM agreed to: first, accept the regional management plan presented by the Aché community; and second, initiate the process of transfer of title from the SEAM to the Aché Community Kuetuvy, which had been solicited by request to SEAM on April 28, 2005 in note #34128. In this fashion, SEAM indicated that the necessary steps were being planned taking into account that the process must comply with certain regulations in order to legally cede title to the community. Soon afterwards, on August 19, 2005 the Secretary of the Environment sent a document (note #563/05) directed to the President of the Republic in reference to the Finca 470, situated in the District of Ygatimi, Department of Canindeyú. This letter stated that the aforementioned property "..was acquired by the Secretary of the Environment for conservation purposes in the area of influence of National Highway 10 "Las Residentas" through the loan number 933/OC-PR from the International Development Bank within the framework of the "Natural Corridors" program of the Public Works and Communications Ministry, as stated in the transfer of title document registered by the Escribanía Mayor de Gobierno in 2003, under the registry n° 30 archive 195 and those that follow."

The document sent to the President of the Republic goes on to repeat SEAM's commitment to the terms of the 2004 Interinstitutional Cooperation Agreement with the ultimate goal of maintaining a forest reserve and transferring title to the indigenous inhabitants of the property in observance with the National Constitution and aforementioned laws N° 352/94, N° 904/94, N° 234/93. Continuing, the document states that ".. taking into account that the aforementioned property functions as permanent location of the native Aché community Kuetuvy, and according to the principles of national law 234/93, which endorses article 14 of ILO Convention 169 (this refers to the Indigenous and Tribal Peoples Convention, 1989 formulated by the Office of the High Commissioner for Human Rights, United Nations) stating that "The rights of ownership and possession of the peoples concerned over the lands which they traditionally occupy shall be recognised.", in my position as Secretary of the Environment I am submitting the background concerning this case to the Presidencia de la República, in order that the corresponding necessary steps be taken by the appropriate entities, in order that we comply with the first clause in the framework of the mentioned International Convention."

The request for executive action on the Kue Tuvy land title was submitted again to the President on March 6, 2006 (SEAM note 177/06) by the Secretary of the Environment, Alfredo Molinas. In summary, the Secretary of the Environment twice directly solicited the office of the President to carry out the administrative processes necessary in order that the Escribanía Mayor de Gobierno, the Paraguayan Indian Institute, and the Indigenous Aché Community all work together to guarantee success in the process of transferring the title of Finca 470 to the Aché Community of Kuetuvy. Despite this request in August 2005, and again in March 2006, no significant steps have been taken to further the land titling process since that time. Instead the Aché have fought and endless battles against illegal loggers, speculators, and so-called "landless peasants". Margarita Mbywangi, the chief of the Kuetuvy community was arrested and imprisoned in Curuguaty in December 2005 along with members of the forestry patrol team who had tried to stop illegal loggers from extracting valuable hardwood trees from the property.

On August 18, 2008, Paraguayan president Fernando Lugo appointed Margarita Mbywangi, an Aché woman, to be the Paraguayan Minister of Indigenous Affairs, the first indigenous person to hold such a position in Paraguay.

== Ancestral lands and range ==
Although early reports locate Aché-like groups throughout eastern Paraguay and the adjacent areas of Brazil, by the 20th century the Aché lived in four dialectally distinct groups that inhabited the Paraná River watershed in the modern day Paraguayan states of Caazapa, Guairá, Alto Paraná, Caaguazu, and Canindeyu. The Northern Aché, who are the best documented, ranged from the forests near Coronel Oviedo, to the Paraná River near Saltos de Guaira, a home range of approximately 20,000 square kilometers.

Eastern Paraguay is characterized by gently rolling hills covered with subtropical, semideciduous forest, and low flat valleys filled with tall grasses. Rainfall totals about 2000 mm per year on average, and is characterized by high unpredictability in monthly patterns from year-to-year, but with a statistical dry season from May to August. Seasonal temperature fluctuations are more consistent, with temperature extremes ranging between 39 and 0 degrees Celsius. Eastern Paraguay contains regions of mature terra firme tropical forest, cerrado, grassland, palm-dominated swamps, bamboo forests, riparian flood forests, and a low drier forest type referred to as "kaati" by Guarani speakers. Although the region is an important endemic bird habitat, with over 400 species of birds recorded in the past few years, mammals are far more important in the Aché culture and economy. A provisional list of the mammalian fauna in the MFR includes 99 species of mammals identified by various methods.

== Food acquisition ==
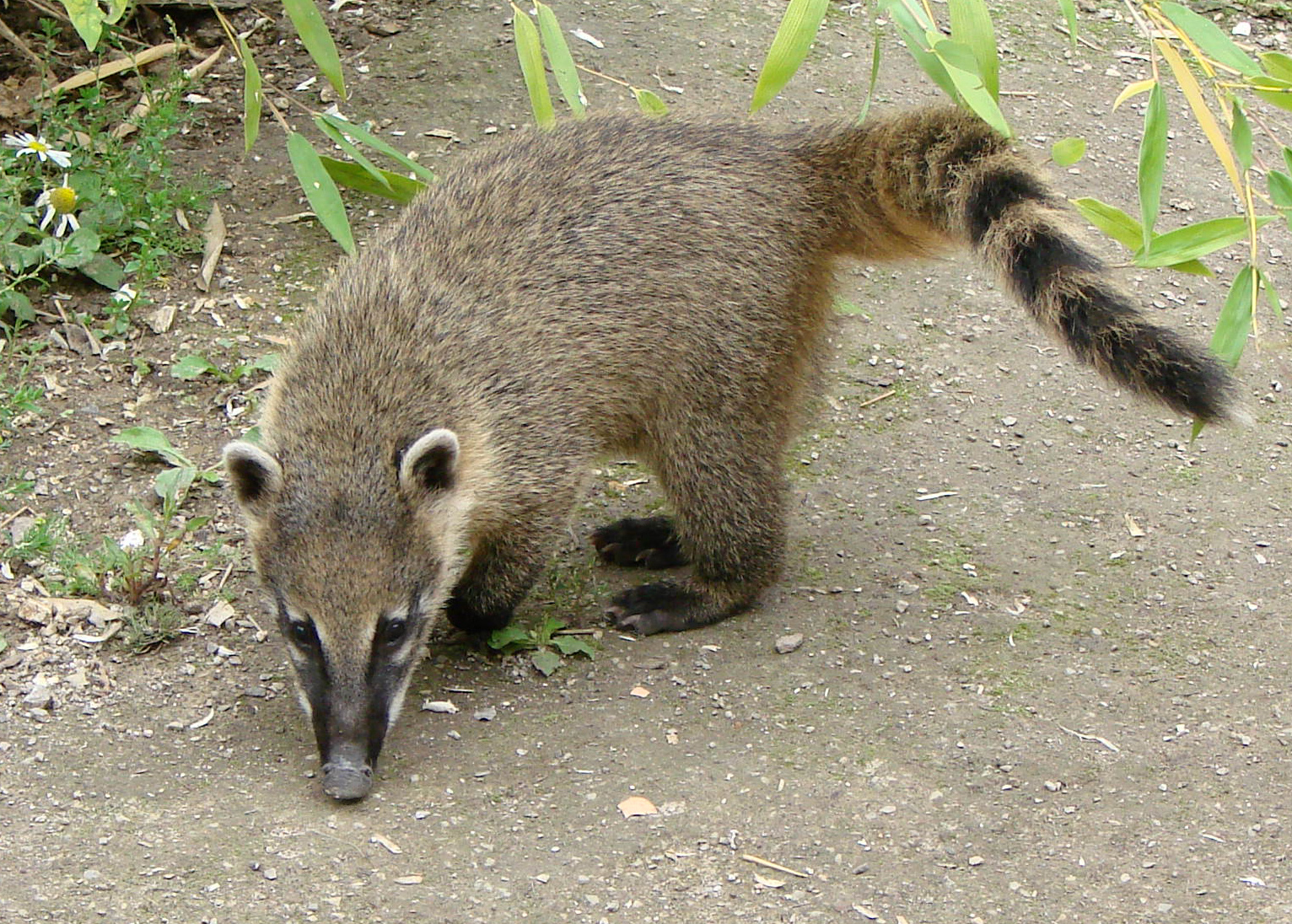
South American coati

The Aché economy was traditionally centered on hunting vertebrate game with bow and arrow, extracting wild honey, and exploiting palm starch and insect larvae. Numerous fruits were also exploited seasonally, but they constitute only a small fraction of the energy in the yearly diet. In the last half century before pacification, Aché groups occasionally raided their settled neighbors for manioc root (a starchy staple), domestic animals, and metal tools.

Systematic recording of dietary intake while living in the forest entirely off wild foods suggests that about 80% of the energy in the diet comes from meat, 10% from palm starch and hearts, 10% from insect larvae and honey, and 1% from fruits. Total energy intake is approximately 2700 kcal per person daily, and males acquire about 84% of all calories consumed. Children do not produce significant amounts of food until they are fully adult. Despite the presence of over 500 species of edible vertebrate prey, only nine species of mammals provide more than 1% of the prey biomass actually harvested by Aché hunters. Most important (in descending order) are nine-banded armadillo, paca, South American tapir, capuchin monkey, white-lipped peccary, South American coati, red brocket, and tegu lizards.

=== Hunting ===
Aché men hunt with bow and arrow, and by hand. They leave camp each morning as a group, walking in single file line, and after about a half-hour, they begin to spread out and search for game. Men stay within earshot of each other throughout the day, to call for assistance if cooperatively pursued prey are encountered. While searching, a hunter walks at a rate of about 1.5 km/h and encounters the most common prey, armadillo, about once every 5 km on average. Monkeys and deer are encountered about 1/3 as frequently as armadillos, and other prey types are considerably more rare in the environment. Armadillos, collared peccaries, deer, tegu lizards, tapir, and most other rare but solitary animals are stalked and pursued alone by bow hunters when encountered. Other species such as paca, monkeys, coatimundi, white-lipped peccaries, and social mammals are usually cooperatively pursued by groups, and encounters with these species usually induce men to call to others for help.

Large and swift mammals are stalked and shot with bow and arrow. Smaller and burrowing mammals are usually captured by hand. Because Aché hunting has been extensively studied using focal follow and other systematic methods, the encounter rates with prey, the time required for a successful pursuit, and the expected energy gains from prey types, are all well known. This has allowed for numerous tests of specific decision models from Optimal Foraging Theory to be tested using Aché data. Results generally support the notion that Aché hunters pursue only those prey types that would increase their energy return rates, and pass by some species (many small birds, rodents, reptiles, etc.) that would probably lower overall foraging returns if pursued.

The question of why men hunt, rather than spend all day extracting palm resources, cannot be explained by energy maximization, since men obtain about 750 calories per hour hunting, and around 1,000 calories per hour extracting palm starch and hearts. Hill has suggested that the macronutrient content of meat, relative to plants, means that meat is worth more nutritionally than equivalent caloric amounts of palm starch. Hawkes on the other hand, has suggested that Aché men hunt because hunting is a form of costly signaling, rather than exclusively a manner to provision hungry family members.

=== Gathering ===
Collected resources include mainly palm hearts and starch, insect larvae extracted from palm trees felled to encourage infestation, wild honey, and various fruits that ripen mainly in summer months, between October and February. Two non-native species are now dispersed throughout the forests of Eastern Paraguay and contribute significantly to the diet: These are honeybees of European origin (Apis mellifera), and volunteer oranges which were introduced by the Jesuits, and subsequently dispersed through the forest by birds and monkeys.

Despite the plant diversity and dietary variety introduced by the various collected species, only palm hearts, starch, and bee honey contribute significant energy to the Aché diet. Palm starch is the most important carbohydrate staple in the Aché diet. Palm trees are cut, then a small "window" is cut in the trunk to test out the inner pith, which when edible is soft and juicy with a high concentration of starch. The growing shoot (heart) is extracted from each cut palm, but this resource has a high water content and provides only a small caloric contribution to the diet.

When a trunk with good starch is discovered, one or more women will open up most of the trunk from base to top of the tree and systematically pound the fiber with the back of an axe to loosen it up and soften it. Large amounts (15–50 kg) are then transported back to the camp in baskets for further processing. At camp the palm fiber is dipped handful by handful into a pot full of water and wrung out by hand to extract all the starch. The pot of water containing the starch is then used to boil meat or insect larvae. This mixture will be eaten hot (as a thick gravy broth) or allowed to cool overnight, which hardens it into a pudding.

Although random transects show a high density of palms in the Mbaracayú region of Paraguay, most of these do not contain starch. Recent work shows that it takes about 15 minutes to find a candidate palm to cut down and then only one out of 8 trees cut has any starch. Thus, by spending a few hours searching for, and exploiting palms, Aché foragers can acquire carbohydrate energy at a rate of just over 1,000 calories per hour.

=== Cooperation during foraging ===
During food acquisition, Aché foragers are frequently observed engaging in activities that require some time or effort and appear mainly designed to raise the foraging return rate of another adult or unrelated child: cooperative foraging. The data suggest that foraging cooperation is widespread and intense, accounting for a good fraction of total foraging time, and including a high number of potentially costly acts that are performed daily. Cooperation also includes some actions that are not very costly to the donor, but which are highly beneficial to the recipient. Most importantly, the cooperative patterns observed during food acquisition are almost certainly related to the well studied Aché food sharing patterns. Reciprocation of foraging cooperation takes place in the form of food redistribution. Finally, cooperation during food acquisition represents only a fraction of total cooperative activity in Aché society. Indeed, cooperative food acquisition, food sharing, and cooperation in other realms (such as child rearing, mobility, camp construction, defense, etc.) are all part of an integrated system of reciprocal altruism and cooperative promotion of group welfare among the Aché.

Cooperative activities during foraging time included the following: cutting trails for others to follow; making bridges for others to cross a river; carrying another's child; climbing a tree to flush a monkey for another hunter; allowing another to shoot at prey when one has the first (or best) shot; allowing another to dig armadillo, or to extract honey or larvae when one has encountered it; yelling the whereabouts of prey escaping; calling the location of a resource for another individual to exploit while one continues searching; calling another to come to a pursuit of peccary, paca, monkey, or coati; waiting for others to join a pursuit, thus lowering one's own return rate; tracking peccaries with no arrows (for other men with arrows to kill); carrying game shot by another hunter; climbing fruit trees to knock down fruit for others to collect; cutting down palms (for others to take heart or fiber); opening a window to test for kraku (for others to come take); carrying the palm fiber others have taken; cutting down fruit trees for others to collect; bringing a bow, arrow, ax or other tool to another in a pursuit; spending time instructing another on how to take a resource; lending a bow or ax when it could be used; helping to look for another's arrows; preparing or repairing another man's bow and arrows in the middle of a pursuit; going back on the trail to warn others of a wasp nest; walking toward other hunters to warn of fresh jaguar tracks or poisonous snakes; removing dangerous obstacles from the trail before others arrive.

The estimate of cooperative time presented below is a minimum estimate, since data were not originally collected with a focus on recording all cooperative activity. Short cooperative activities were especially unlikely to be recorded in field notes. For example, examination of videotapes from hunting episodes during the sample period reveals that very short cooperative activities are frequently embedded into longer hunting segments that we have not coded as cooperative time. While pursuing monkeys, hunters often call to others to "stay put", "don't make noise", "don't shoot", "shake a branch", "pound a vine" etc. Other multi-hunter pursuits contain numerous similar requests. The recipient of such a command almost always complies immediately, at a cost to his own chances of making the kill. These events were extremely common, but of very short duration (usually only 10 seconds or so) and are not included in the analyses. Aché men spent an average of 41 (s.e. 7) minutes per day in food acquisition activities scored as cooperative, and women spent 33 (s.e. 14) minutes per day cooperating in foraging. This represents about 10% of total foraging time in the men's sample, and 11% of total foraging time in the women's sample. Both sexes show some sample days with more than 50% of total foraging time being spent helping other individuals to acquire resources.

== Food sharing ==
Aché foragers living in the forest share food extensively, and animal prey are divided up communally among band members. Social norms proscribe men from eating anything from their own prey, and emphasize the importance of band-wide distributions. In essence, wild game is cooked and redistributed in equal portions to resident families, taking into account the size of each family that receives a portion. This means that successful hunters and their families obtain no more meat from their own captured prey than would be expected by a random distribution to resident families. Palm starch produced in large batches is shared in a manner similar to meat (but with no overt taboo against women consuming some of the starch they have extracted). Honey is somewhat less widely shared, but large portions are saved for members absent at the time of extraction. Collected fruits and insect larvae are even less widely shared but are still redistributed to those not present at a collection site. A hunter's nuclear family usually consumes about 10% of the game brought in by the male head of the household. For most other resources the nuclear family of the acquirer keeps less than 50% for their own consumption, but only 10-20% of small collected fruits are shared outside the family. More recent analyses show that high acquisition variance resources are shared more widely, that the amount of most foods shared is contingent on amount received across dyads of potential sharing partners, and that needy families consistently receive more than they give. Reservation food sharing patterns show that people who are more generous are more likely to receive help and support when they become sick or injured.

== Social organization ==
Aché foragers in the pre-contact period lived in small bands ranging from 3-4 families to a couple dozen families (median band size is approximately 50 individuals). But these residential units often subdivided for a few days, and occasionally coalesced into large gatherings, thus the composition of reported bands in systematic interviews ranges from 3 to 160 individuals. During club-fighting rituals, three or four bands might unite, resulting in temporary camps of 200 or more individuals that might camp together for 5–15 days before dispersal. More frequently bands of many families would break up into temporary task groups that would leave children and older band members in a permanent camp, while younger adults traveled to distant areas for a few days in search of specific resources that were depleted nearby. On such forays, successful task groups would return to the main camp laden with smoked meat and other goodies.

Band membership was highly flexible over time, and was based as much on affinal ties and friendships as on consanguineal relations. Some small groups of kin (a couple brothers, or brother-sister groups) usually formed the core membership of each band, but composition appears to be highly flexible when assessed over a period of years. Bands did not have territories, but did have favored home ranges from which they strayed only occasionally. Bands were not named, but often referred to by the name of the most influential male member (e.g., Tayjangi-the-killer's band). Aché societies were not organized into any specific kin or ritual groups, and leadership was informal and often context specific. There were no recognized chiefs, nor any other political-religious office. The Aché had no specialist shamans, but older individuals and pregnant women were often involved in healing activities. Decisions were reached through informal consensus, and strong dissent was expressed by abandoning a residential band. Women were involved in most discussions, but some men were clearly politically dominant, and men who had killed (called "jaychagi") were especially feared and "respected". These killers often sharpened their bowstave at one end to look like a spear point, and threatened others by their demeanor. Children were especially terrified of the killers who made a grand display of noise or growling, bluff and bluster (shaking tree branches and swaggering) when entering a residential camp after a day of hunting.

== Social norms, ethnic signals, rituals and beliefs ==
Aché cultural conventions emphasize food sharing, regulated cooperation, group participation in raising and nourishing children, restrained violence, and marriage proscriptions for members of the ethnic group. Behaviors towards outgroup individuals is unregulated.

=== Life events ===
The birth of a child introduces a series of lifelong obligations between the child, its parents, and those who take on ritual roles during the birth. The child's mother is helped during labor and later is ritually washed by some of the helpers. The child will be held immediately after birth by a "godmother" that is responsible for washing and caring for the infant during the first few days after birth while mother rests. The child and godmother adopt ritual terms for each other, and the child can expect food, help and support from its godmother throughout its life. A man cuts the umbilical cord of the child and becomes the "godfather" with similar lifelong obligations. Men who have provided the mother with game during her pregnancy also take on a ritual obligation to the child, and so do all the band members who hold the child and wash it soon after birth. The obligations through the life course are reciprocal such that the child is cared for by ritual "godparents" when young and later cares for them in turn when they become elderly. Both biological parents and all the ritual godparents retain lifetime obligations of mutual aid.

When a girl reaches menarche, she is held in the lap by adults in a ritual similar to that at birth. She is then partially secluded for some time, being covered with woven palm-leaf mats. After seclusion, she is cut with broken glass, and charcoal is rubbed into the wound to create a set of linear parallel tattoo marks. Men who have had sexual relations with her prior to menarche also undergo ritual purification at this time. Women keep their hair cut short and wear seed and tooth necklaces as tribal ethnic identifiers.

When boys begin to show facial hair growth, they too undergo a puberty ritual, which is usually timed to coincide with a birth or female puberty ceremony. Their lower lip is pierced with a sharpened bone, and then a wooden labret is introduced. This adornment is worn only by younger men, but all men retain the perforation in their lip for life. After the lip-piercing ceremony, young men are cut and tattooed in the same fashion described for young women. The man who perforates their lip becomes a ritual godfather. Newly initiated young men usually accompany the ritual godfather for some time, often leaving their own nuclear families behind.

When they became too old or too disabled to be productive members of the tribe, Aché women were violently murdered by another man in their tribe. Unproductive elderly Aché men were exiled from the group.

One of the four groups of Aché is reported to have practiced cannibalism occasionally, possibly as late as the 1960s, and the northern group sometimes euthanized and cremated elderly people thought to harbor dangerous vengeful spirits (possibly advanced dementia, or Alzheimer's disease).

=== Rituals and beliefs ===
The most important northern Aché ritual was the club-fight. These events were organized by "big men" and took place once every year or two. Several bands would converge on a single camping area. Those who invited the others would prepare a cleared area in which to do ritual combat. Men prepared long hardwood clubs with sharpened edges (paddle-shaped), and decorated themselves with charcoal (mixed with honey and saliva) and vulture down. Although club fights consisted of hosting and invited teams of men, after the fighting began all men were free to choose opponents from either group. Men faced off and took turns swinging at each other's heads. Some men were hit directly on the top of the head and sustained fractured skulls, that later healed, but with tell-tale signs of combat. Other men dodged the clubs, but might be hit on the arms or shoulders. Some men died in almost every large clubfighting event. Sometimes clubfighting would also emerge spontaneously within a small residential band, when one man was caught having sexual relations with another man's wife. These types of duels were never lethal. In all clubfights, some bystanders (including women) would rush in and try to hamper or disarm men who were in combat with their father, sons or brothers.

Aché mythology is centered around Berendy, a flaming thunderous being that at times takes the form of a meteor, and at times has a body of flesh and blood. Berendy's son is the subject of several myths, which also include themes of the origin of jaguars, the sun and the moon, the origins of fire, and some moral tales about stingy old men and old women. Northern Aché emphasized the spiritual powers of a being that manifest itself as both shadow and wind. Southern Aché groups appear to have included a malevolent spirit that originates from the souls of angry deceased Aché.

All Aché believe in some types of hunting magic, and in the curative powers of pregnant women.

== Demography ==
Aché demography has been extensively studied and analyzed in the framework of evolutionary life history theory. Major causes of death in the forest period were in-group homicides (especially of infants and children), external warfare, respiratory disease, tropical fevers, and accidents. Over 40% of all adult deaths, and more than 60% of all child deaths, were due to violence by other Aché or by outsiders. In the forest period, about 65% of all children born survived to adulthood (age 15), and life expectancy for those young adults was an additional 40 years on average. 14% of males and 23% of females under the age of 10 were killed, with the victims predominantly being orphans; infants orphaned within the first year of life were always killed.

Fertility was high, with completed family sizes of post reproductive women being just over 8 live births. Analyses indicate that high return hunters, and large bodied women, had higher lifetime reproductive success than their peers. More detailed information relevant to theories about body size variation, age at menarche, menopause, life history tradeoffs, etc. are presented in Hill and Hurtado's 1996 Aché Life History.

== See also ==
- Genocide of indigenous peoples in Paraguay
