= Tres de Mayo, Paraguay =

Tres de Mayo
- Location within Paraguay
- Coordinates: 26°28′46″S 56°05′46″W
- Country: Paraguay
- Department: Caazapá Department
- Founded: 2012

Area
  - Total: 74,325 km^{2} (28,697 sq mi)
- Elevation: 168 m (551 ft)

Population (2016)
  - Total: 17,928

Tres de Mayo is a municipality of Paraguay located in the outskirts of Caazapá. Formerly it was part of the district of Yuty, but in 2012 it was elevated to the category of municipality. It has a total area of 743,25 km^{2} and a population of 17,928 inhabitants in 2016.
