= Vehicle registration plates of Paraguay =

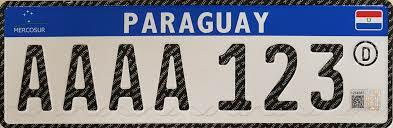
Current Paraguayan vehicle license plate for a private-use vehicle, introduced in July 2019.

Since the end of the year 2000 Paraguay has required its residents to register their motor vehicles with the National Register of Vehicles (Registro Nacional de Automotores) and to display vehicle registration plates; this system has replaced the former one whereby plates were issued by municipal authorities, who also kept local registers.

In Paraguay basically three registration systems have been used: municipal patents, national patents and Mercosur patents. The former was used for much of the 20th century until the year 2000, the latter has been in use since the end of the year 2000, and the latter has been in use since the middle of the year 2019. These last two systems currently co-exist.

== 2019 Mercosur standard ==
In October 2014 the design of the new license plate to be used by all Mercosur countries was officially presented. This consists of a plate of 15.75 in × 5.12 in (400.05 mm × 130.05 mm), with a white background, the characters and frame in black and a blue band at the top that shows the name of the country, its flag and the Mercosur logo. The typeface used is FE-Schrift. On July 1, 2019, the Mercosur standard license plate was adopted in Paraguay.

== Municipal License Plates (20th century) ==
Previously, Paraguayan patents were issued by the respective municipalities. The last format (used between 1982 and 2000) was A 123456, where the letter represented the department (with the exception of those patented in Asunción, which consisted only of numbers). The design varied according to the area, although they were generally on a white background with red characters for the municipalities of the interior, and a blue background with white characters for Asunción.

In the early days, there was no defined standard for automobile license plates, especially for the interior, as the size and font type (inscriptions) of the license plate varied from municipality to municipality, and from year to year. Some municipalities kept the same plate series (or number) for a vehicle, while other municipalities changed the plate series every year for the same vehicle. The first license plates throughout the country were made up of only numbers (between two and five figures). At the beginning the blue background and the inscriptions in white. The name of the municipality where it was issued, and the year of the patent (last two digits) were inscribed on the license plate.

The registrations were both for motor vehicles, as well as carts by blood traction (generally drawn by horses). In the late 1950s, license plates began to be classified according to the type of vehicle category (e.g., the letter "P" was for private motor vehicles, "O" for buses, "C" for commercial uses, etc.). Some municipalities of the Interior inscribed their coat of arms and/or "motto" on the license plate (e.g.: "Capital of Energy" for the district of Hernandarias, Alto Paraná). The format changed over the years.

The license plates for special vehicles both in the interior and in the capital (e.g., state, municipal, diplomatic, judicial or other authorities) were of a different format than the general one. (e.g.: blue background for vehicles of municipal authorities -in the case of license plates for the interior-, etc.)

=== Asuncion (capital) ===
In the case of Asunción, for private vehicles the plate format only had numbers inscribed in white, and the background was blue; in addition to including the name of the municipality with the country and the last two digits of the year of the patent (sometimes registered by the license plate itself, or otherwise affixed by seal). The last serial for Asunción was 218 030, from 1999.

Asunción used the license plate classification format according to vehicle category (letters: P, O, C, etc.) in force from the end of the 1950s to 1984.

For special vehicles (tax-exempt, e.g. state), the background was usually yellow. Public transport vehicles (collective) and taxis had red bottom plates with white numbers. Vehicles intended for municipal use (garbage collector, municipal police, street repair machine, etc.) had pink bottom plates with black numbers.

=== Interior (departmental) ===
==== No fixed system ====
From the first license plates for vehicles in the country, until the end of the 1950s, the license plates did not have a fixed design, they simply had two or three serial numbers and the last digits of the year.

==== System C 1234 (by category) ====
Since the late 1950s, license plates were classified according to the type of vehicle category (letters: P, O, C, etc.). In the early 1960s, the interior license plates changed the background to white with red inscriptions (used until today), as they previously had no fixed design. However, for special vehicles they had a different format/design (e.g.: municipal authority license plates had a blue background, etc.)

==== System C 1–1234 (by category and department) ====
In 1967, interior license plates began to be classified by department, according to the first number followed by a hyphen and then the license plate serial number. For example, the case of the license plate issued in Fernando de la Mora: C 11–3726. (Being "C" the category of the vehicle, "11" the department number by order -in this case corresponding to the Central department-, and 3726 the serial of the lock). This departmental number format was used until 1979, as was vehicle categorization.

==== System A 123456 (by department) ====
Between 1980 and 1982 the license plates for the interior returned to the blue background, to change again to the white background with red inscriptions in 1983, until today. Until 1981 only numbers were used in the license plate serial number.

From the years 1982 (1983 already with red characters and a white background), until almost the end of the year 2000, the latest format of the municipal plates was used, in which the interior license plates had a "letter" at the beginning, followed by several numbers (serial). The letters stood for the departments the badges were issued from:.

- A – Concepción
- B – San Pedro
- C – Cordillera
- D – Guairá
- E – Caaguazú
- F – Caazapá
- G – Itapúa
- H – Misiones
- I – Paraguarí
- J – Alto Paraná
- K – Central
- L – Ñeembucú
- M – Amambay
- P – Canindeyú
- Q – Presidente Hayes
- R – Alto Paraguay
- S – Chaco-used since 1992, equivalent to the current Boquerón-
- T – Nueva Asunción -used until 1992–
- U – Anchovy -used until 1992–

== National License Plates (2000–2019; in force) ==
=== Background ===
To put an end to the business of "mau" cars (smuggling) -under pressure from its Mercosur partners-, and unify at the national level in a single system the vehicles registered in the country, since previously was registered by each municipality, in the 1990s a new, safer and more permanent patenting system began to be projected (until the end of the vehicle's useful life).

Also taking into account that the Paraguayan vehicle fleet was increasing, since at the end of the 20th century there were around 500,000 vehicles registered at that time out of a total of 5,000,000 inhabitants; During the presidency of Juan Carlos Wasmosy, Law No. 608/95 came to light, creating the "Automotive Registration and Identification System", which came into effect at the end of the 1990s. re-registration began only at the end of the year 2000, after several postponements, and lasted until approximately two years later.

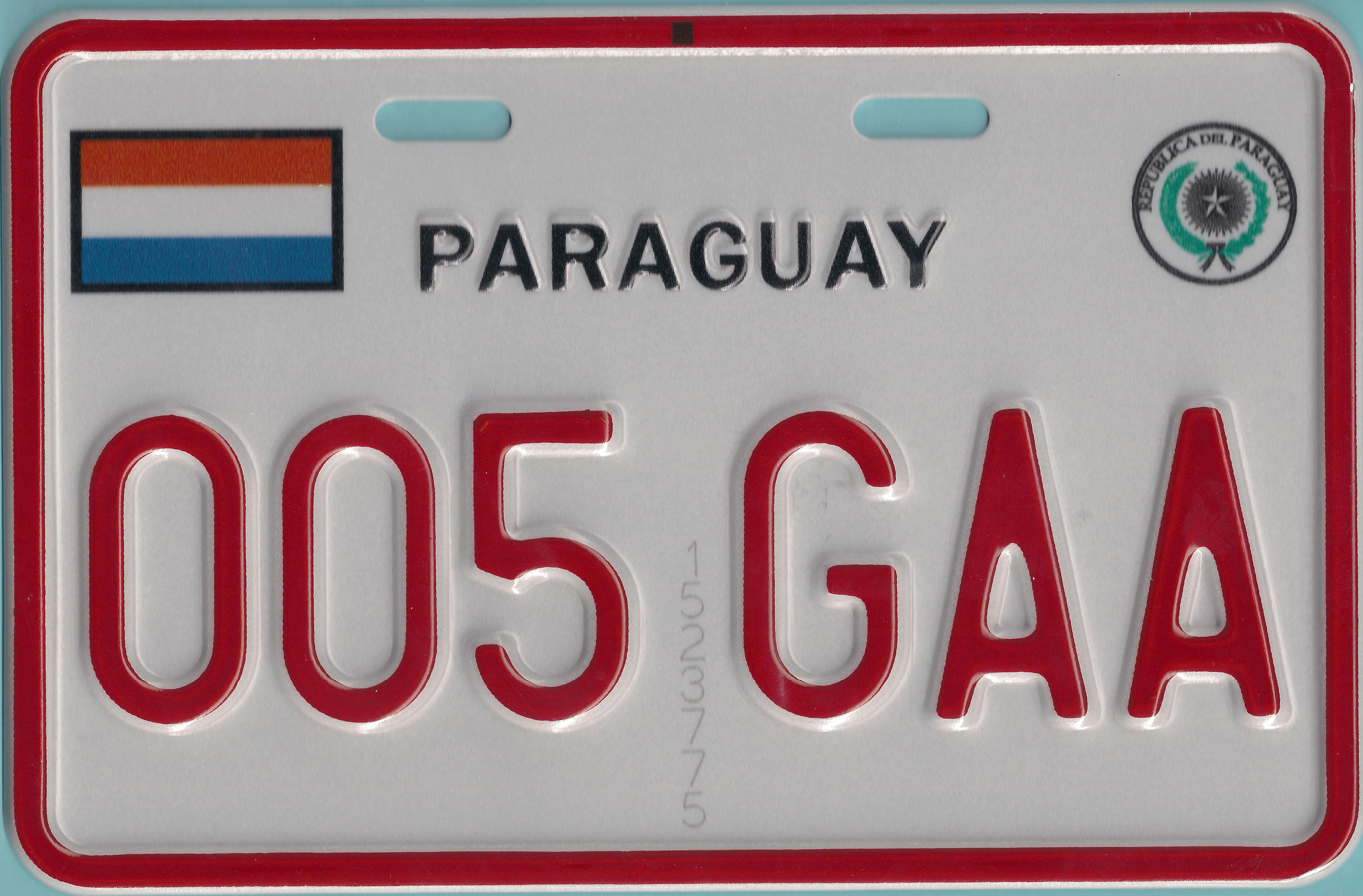
Paraguayan registration plates still in force, issued from the year 2000 to 2019.

Since October 2, 2000, Paraguay has required its residents to register their vehicles at the Motor Vehicle Registry Directorate (dependent on the Supreme Court of Justice), to carry the new license plates. registration or plates, as it is colloquially called. This system has replaced the previous format, in which the plates were issued by the municipal authorities, but which still maintain local records and collect the respective taxes.

However, several extensions were issued in 2001 and 2002 for those who had not yet registered their vehicles in the Motor Vehicle Registry, or had problems in the process of legalizing their vehicles. For the year 2004, the vast majority of vehicles had already adopted the current system, however there were still vehicles registered in the Special and Transitory Registry of the Automotive Registry computer system. These vehicles, instead of having been granted the 'green card' (under normal conditions), were given the 'brown card', which was only useful within the national territory while the legal procedures of the vehicle were regularized (whether it was mau or No). Therefore, Law 2405/04 was issued, which allowed the aforementioned vehicles to be regularized, if the vehicles were not subject to "claim action or theft complaint".

=== Features and special uses ===
The plates or "plates" present a combination of three letters and three numbers -inscribed in red- ('ABC 123' for vehicles in general, '123 ABC' for motorcycles); with the flag of Paraguay in the upper left, the denomination "PARAGUAY" in the upper center, and the national symbol in the upper right; and remain with the vehicle for the remainder of its useful life.

Its dimensions are 320mm x 150mm for vehicle license plates in general, and 200mm x 130mm for motorcycles. For lost or stolen license plates, the letters "D" (duplicate) and "T" (triplicate) are stamped within a circle in the middle of the series of letters and numbers.

The series "Axx nnn" and "Bxx nnn" have been used mainly by the Registry's central office in Asunción, while series beginning with other letters have been used by Registry offices in the interior of the country. The "Exx nnn" series is (originally) reserved for public (state) vehicles that are exempt from taxes (although these can be sold to private individuals and cease to be state-owned). The "Txx nnn" series is for tractores and agricultural machinery, the "Vxx nnn" series is for vintage cars (and "VAP nnn" for those belonging to the Vehicle Circle members Ancients of Paraguay). License plates for individuals can be personalized, as long as it is not restricted by law and at an additional cost (for example: 108 is not allowed, among other examples).

There are also plates inscribed in black for people elected to government positions, such as "SEN nnn" for Senatores, "DIP nnn" for Representatives (Deputys), "JMx nnn" for members of the Municipal Board, and the plates "PJx nnn" for official vehicles of the judges. License plates for diplomats have another format different from the general one, with a black background and white inscriptions, made up of letters and 6 numbers. These letters are: CD (Diplomatic Corps); CC (Consular Corps); MOE (Foreign Official Mission).

Provisionally, newly registered vehicles obtain plates with a series beginning with P (from "PRx"), which is changed to the formal plate, once registration is completed, valid for twenty days from issue.

== Mercosur license plates (in implementation since 2019) ==
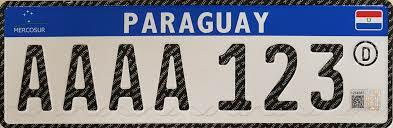
Mercosur registration for Paraguay, in the process of implementation since July 2019

In October 2014, in the Salón Libertador of the Palacio San Martín in Buenos Aires, the new Unique Mercosur Patent was presented. On that date, the States Parties to Mercosur approved Resolution 033/14, which established its mandatory use as of January 1, 2016. The first country to implement its use was Uruguay, in March 2015, Argentina in April 2016 and Brazil in October 2018. First it would be mandatory only for 0 km vehicles, and then gradually for all.

Paraguay began to adopt this system on July 1, 2019, under the format "AAAA nnn" (A: Letters – n: Numbers) for vehicles in general; and "nnn AAAA" for motorcycles, firstly for patent pending vehicles, 0 km vehicles and patented vehicles from the year 2016 onwards (the latter optional, through exchanges). In Paraguay, the registration of 0 km vehicles should have been mandatory since the beginning of 2016, while the reregistration of used cars would be progressive but initially optional, but it was postponed on several occasions.

=== Specific data ===
This new license plate, which will be used in the member countries of MERCOSUR, will have the following common characteristics:

- Dimensions: 400 mm x 130 mm and a thickness of 1 mm (European standard size).
- Official emblem of the bloc and identification with the name and flag of each country, on a strip of blue color Pantone 286.
- Security measures: watermark, hot stamping with security foil with diffractive and sine wave effect.
- Typographic font: FE Engschrift in black on a white background.

== Chronology ==
Asuncion (capital)
Period	Color	Format	Example
?-1960	Variable	Random numbers	123
1960–1984	Blue background, white characters	A letter (category)-Random numbers	P12345
1984–2000	Blue background, white characters	Random numbers	123456
2000–2019	White background, red characters	Three random letters and three numbers (national)	ABC 123
2019–	White background, black characters	Four random letters and three numbers (mercosur)	ABCD 123

Interior (departmental)
Period	System	Color	Format	Example
?-1959/60	1234	Variable	Random numbers	123
1959/60-1967	C 1234	White background, red characters	A letter (category)-Random numbers	Q123
1967–1979	C 1–1234	White background, red characters	A letter (category)-A number (department)-Random numbers	P 11-1234
1980–1981	A 123456	Blue background, white characters	A number (department)-Random numbers	11-1234
1982	A 123456	Blue background, white characters	A letter (department)-Random numbers	K-12345
1983–2000	A 123456	White Background, Red Characters	One Letter (Department)-Random Numbers	K-123456
2000–2019	XXX 123	White background, red characters	Three random letters and three numbers (national)	ABC 123
2019–	XXXX 123	White background, black characters	Four random letters and three numbers (mercosur)	ABCD 123

== Total enrollment by department ==
As of May 31, 2019, 2,326,335 vehicles of all kinds have been registered. (61.85% belong to automobiles, 35.66% to motorcycles, and 2.49% other types of vehicles)

- Updated as of May 31, 2019.

#	Department	Patents
1	Central	670,709
2	Asunción (capital)	429,475
3	Upper Parana	388,416
4	Itapua	204,850
5	Caaguazú	125,359
6	Cordillera	59,108
7	Amambay	57,131
8	San Pedro	55,896
9	Guaira	55,536
10	Canindeyu	46,984
11	Paraguarí	46,492
12	Anchovy	45,185
13	Concepción	38,564
14	Missions	28,815
15	Caazapa	25,716
16	Ñeembucú	23,158
17	President Hayes	21,074
18	Upper Paraguay	985
–	No data	2,909
	Paraguay	2,326,335
