= Abaí =

District of Caazapá, Uruguay

Abaí Ava'i
- District
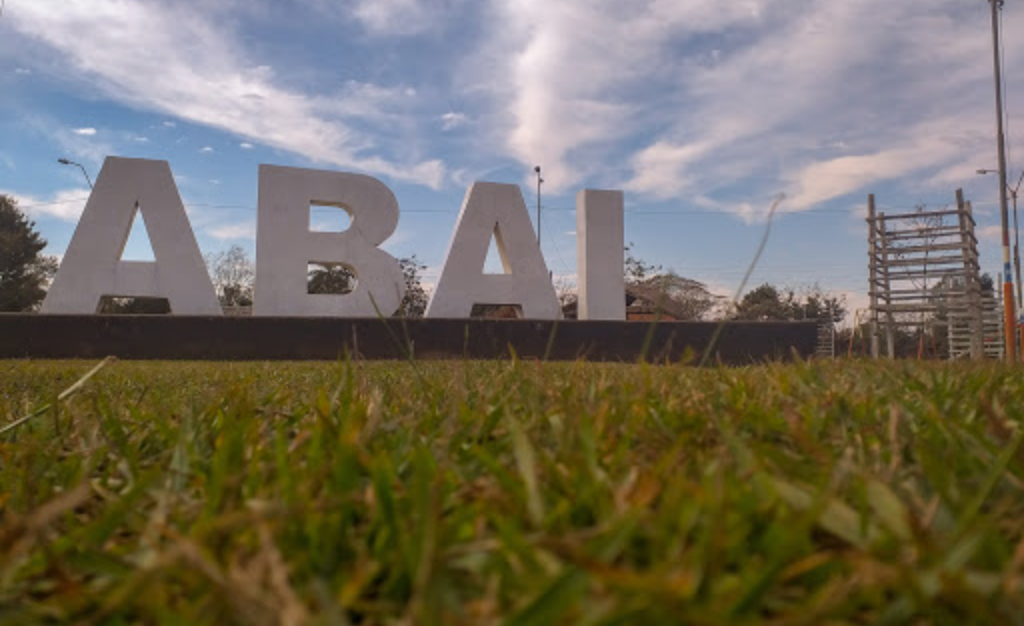
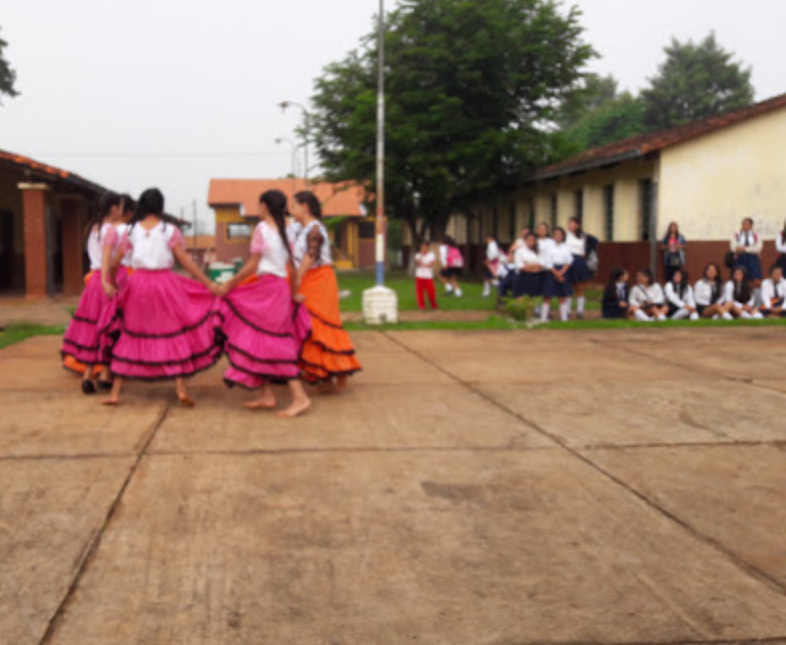
- Clockwise from top: The welcoming sign of the city and a traditional dance taking place in an Abaí school.

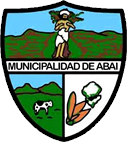
- Coat of arms
- Etymology: Small person
- Nickname(s): The Last Stop
- Location within Paraguay

Government
  - Mayor: Christian Andrés Acosta (ANR)

Area
  - Total: 2,018 km^{2} (779 sq mi)
- Elevation: 155 m (509 ft)

Population
  - 2023 estimate: 33,792
  - Density: 16.12/km^{2} (41.8/sq mi)
- Time zone: UTC-4
- Calling code: 544
- Website: https://www.muniabai.gov.py

Abaí (Guarani: Ava'i [aʋaˈʔi]) is a district of Caazapá, Paraguay. It is the biggest district of the department and one of the country's biggest agricultural zones.

The Caazapá Range divides the district into two zones: the low zone in which most companies are, and the high zone where the most productive company in the district, Tupã Renda, is located.

== Etymology ==
Abaí was a hostile, swampy zone. The first sawmill workers who were in charge of cutting the trees down with axes and machetes would often face several dangers such as wild animals, typical of virgin forests.

Sometimes they would also find people from either Aché or Mbya Guarani tribes, but because of low visibility the settlers thought these creatures flew from tree to tree and considered them some kind of mythical beings whom they called ava'i ("small person" in Guaraní).

== History ==
=== First years ===
It was created as a small settlement at the beginning of the 20th century and was located in the city of San Juan Nepomuceno, from which it broke apart when it was promoted to municipality on October 4, 1960.

Its first settlers were workers hired by José Fassardi, a wealthy Italian visionary. In 1914 he began installing a big mechanized sawmill with an Italian immigrant surnamed Portaluppi and a Paraguayan national surnamed Espinoza. It was part of a steam-powered wood and furniture workshop established by them in 1887, located near the Ybytyruzú. This sawmill also generated electrical power.

Fassardi's company acquired 372,000 hectares (920,000 acres) of forest, which included the totality of Abaí.

In 1918, the FCCP started passing by Abaí. In the beginning, its main purpose was transporting wood and workers to the bigger sawmill. After that, it started being used as a means of transport for travellers, with a train terminal being built as part of a project that would delineate the path until Foz do Iguaçu. This project was never finished, leaving Abaí as the last stop (hence its nickname).

=== Chaco War ===
By orders of then-colonel José Félix Estigarribia, wagons full of Abaí soldiers would make its way to the disputed zones during the Chaco War.

=== World War II ===
During World War II, Paraguay under Higinio Morínigo's military government exported beef, grain, cotton and wood to the United States. This favored many farmers from Abaí to seel their products which were transported by the railways. Although the lack communication at the time made the locals unaware of the final destination of their goods, this became an important source of income for the district in the forties.

=== Stronato ===
The first oratory in the city was built in 1955 in honor to Saint Sebastian. Between 1956 and 1957, the parish priest of San Juan Nepomuceno, Father Carlos Heine, drew the boundaries of the first towns, each of which would later get an oratory of its own. The person in charge of building the oratories was Cleto Escurra.

In 1958, the parish of Abaí became independent from that of San Juan Nepomuceno. This independence later became governmental.

General Alfredo Stroessner (colloquially known as the Stronato) had several anti-communist forces, one of which was Infantry Regiment No. 14, headed by Patricio Colmán. Colmán was sent to Abaí in 1960 and stayed at Escurra's home with the purpose of stopping 54 people who had entered the country from Argentina with the help of the United National Liberation Front.

Colmán considered himself to be in debt with the locals who helped him capture the rebels. Therefore he took a high responsibility in achieving independence for Abaí, as he had strong ties with then-Minister of Interior Edgar L. Insfrán. He achieved this together with Escurra, the town's first JP Adolfo Vázquez and several other important people. The gatherings usually took place at Vázquez's house. The place was turned into a district by law on October 4, 1960.

In 1962, the city temple was built after the arrivel of Father Juan de Dios Bogado, after whom the city's central square was named. Father Bogado evangelized the town despite physical disabilities.

=== Post-1989 ===
The first mayor by direct designation of then-president Andrés Rodríguez was Juan Ramón Troche. The first elected mayor was teacher Celina Roa de Morel, succeeded by Avelino López, Marcelo López, Andrés Avelino López, Augusto Martínez, Alipio Acosta and Christian Acosta.

Currently, Abaí has nine educational centers, sixty elementary institutions, nineteen middle schools and eight special centers for youth and adults. It also has a health center, seven family health units and three health posts. The district's safety is distributed among six police stations. The two indigenous tribes with settlements on their own are the Aché and the Mbya Guarani.

== Geography ==
Abaí is composed of 54 companies and separated into two zones:

- The High Zone, named thus because of its predominantly high ground, is located in the Northwestern part and is home to a high amount of Brazilian immigrants.
- The Low or Southeast Zone is a big plain watered by the Capiibary River, next to which the district's capital and most of its population is settled.

A big part of the district is located above the Guarani Aquifer. It is separated from Caaguazú by the Capiibary River and from Alto Paraná by rivers Monday and Ypeti. It contains several streams like Capiibary Guazú, Chakira, Yñe'ẽ, Cristal, Ypeti Guazú, Ypetimi, Tarumá, Cecina, Capi’itindy, Morotî, Yaguacuna, Tacuara, Itá, Arroyo Guazú, Mbaya and Mbariguí. Most of the Caazapá National Park is located in Abaí.

The paraje Ka'aguy Juru (the forest's mouth in Guaraní) used to be the entrance to the forest filled with native species such as lapacho, cedar and yvyra pytã.

== Culture ==
The district's patronal festival is on January 20 in honor of Saint Sebastian. Its main activities are mechanized agriculture, animal husbandry and forestry.

The most popular sport is football. The Abaí Football League, which participates in UFI tournaments, is composed of ten teams.

The city has folklore expos and music festivales each year, including the Kapi'ivary Purahéi Festival, considered one of the best in the country.
