= Luis Cabral (footballer) =

Paraguayan footballer (born 1983)

Personal information
- Full name: Luis Alberto Cabral Vázquez
- Date of birth: 23 September 1983 (age 43)
- Place of birth: Capiíbary, Paraguay
- Height: 1.75 m (5 ft 9 in)
- Position: Defender

Team information
- Current team: Independiente CG

Senior career*
Years	Team	Apps	(Gls)
2005–2006	Guaraní	14	(1)
2006	Fernando de la Mora	17	(0)
2007–2011	Sol de América	170	(11)
2012–2019	Guaraní	268	(18)
2020	Nacional	25	(3)
2021	Sportivo Luqueño	15	(3)
2021	River Plate (Asunción)	16	(2)
2022–2024	Tacuary	84	(2)
2024–2025	Recoleta	15	(1)
2025–	Independiente CG	10	(0)

International career
2009–2012	Paraguay	3	(1)
- * Club domestic league appearances and goals as of 08:28, 4 October 2026 (UTC)

Luis Alberto Cabral Vázquez (born 23 September 1983) is a Paraguayan international footballer, who plays for Independiente CG as a defender.

== Career ==
Born in Capiíbary, Cabral has played for Guaraní, Fernando de la Mora, Sol de América, Nacional, Sportivo Luqueño, River Plate (Asunción), Tacuary, Recoleta and Independiente CG.

He made his international debut for Paraguay in 2009.
