= Felipe Sosa =

Paraguayan musician

- Born: Felipe Sosa; April 11, 1945 (age 81); Caazapá, Paraguay
- Known for: Guitarist, Composer
- Notable work: “Suite Paraguaya” “Sonata para la Paz” “El amanecer”

Felipe Sosa (born April 11, 1945) is a Paraguayan musician, guitarist, composer and teacher, from Caazapá, a city of the department with the same name in Paraguay. Throughout his career, Sosa recorded 21 albums, 2 of them with orchestras, and the rest as guitar solos. In Paraguay he is considered one of the main promotors of the music of Mangoré.

== Childhood and youth ==
He spent his childhood and adolescence in his hometown. He completed elementary school in Caazapá. He later moved to Asunción, the capital of Paraguay, to pursue his high school degree. He later started his musical studies in the Escuela Normal de Música (Normative School of Music). He graduated from there school, and obtaining his professor of guitar diploma with honors for his dedication.

== Career ==
Since 1967, at the age of 22, he began studying abroad to perfect his skills. He traveled several times to Brazil, where he contacted and studied with professor Isaías Sabio. From 1967 to 1969 he was in Spain studying music with Professor Regino Sainz de la Maza. In 1971 he traveled to Uruguay in order to study with Professor Abel Carlevaro. In 1974 he was hired by the International Society of Guitar to go on a tour and participate in concerts in Central America and part of the United States. In 1976 he participated in the 2nd International Seminar of Guitar in Montevideo, Uruguay, where he was awarded a gold medal. Also in 1976 he was chosen as Outstanding Young Person by the Junior Camera of Asunción. In 1983 Felipe traveled to Europe where he participated in courses of Esthetics of Sound in the Schola Cantorum in Paris with Professor Alexandre Lagoya. In 1988 the Brazilian government awarded him the Medal “Heitor Villalobos” for his work in the dissemination of the songs made by this Brazilian composer.

Today, Felipe Sosa continues to compose and work to broaden the culture. He began running the project “Promoción de la Guitarra Clásica Paraguaya a Nivel Local e International” (Local and International Promotion of the Paraguayan Classical Guitar), hoping to contribute to further development of the Paraguayan Classical Guitar by organizing events that generate interaction between the musician and the public.

Recently, Felipe Sosa released an album called “La Guitarra Universal de Felipe Sosa” (The Universal Guitar of Felipe Sosa), in which he performs themes from Agustín Pío Barrios and music from the universal guitar repertoire. The goal of the project is to hold an international guitar contest, called “Agustín Pío Barrios – Mangoré” in order to promote the study of the classical guitar.

Sosa also composes music for the Paraguayan harp.

=== Teacher of guitar players ===
Felipe Sosa has taught classical guitar players in Paraguay. His students include Berta Rojas, Diosnel Hernsdorf, and Luz María Bobadilla.

== Work ==
Felipe Sosa continues to promote the guitar. The master Felipe has released in Buenos Aires his book ”La guitarra universal de Felipe Sosa” (The universal guitar of Felipe Sosa). This material was the number 17, who made his first recording at the age of 19 in the RCV Víctor of Buenos Aires. He has more records in Uruguay, Spain and in Paraguay. He recorded “La suite Mangoré” with two guitars and the orchestra of the master Florentín Giménez. This suite includes five Agustin Pío Barrios’ compositions. Sosa recorded also Ramón Noble’s “El concierto mexicano” (The Mexican concert) with Mexico Symphonic Orchestra.

“La guitarra” (The guitar) is the name of one of Felipe Sosa's most recent records and is sample of his varied repertoire. The material includes the songs Quirino Báez Allende’s “Vals Florinda”, Ampelio Villalba's “La Polca Juana de Lara” and of his own composition, “Villa Alondra”.

Felipe Sosa has a radio program that promotes guitar songs and their performers. With this program, Sosa tries to show that Paraguay is a place of reference for the guitar where young and new performers can have their music broadcast live.

== Compositions ==
Among his most outstanding compositions are:

- Suite paraguaya.
- Sonata para la Paz.
- Reminiscencia de Ytú.
- Villa alondra.
- El cuarteto de guitarras.
- El amanecer

He has also arranged pieces of Paraguayan folklore to music sheets for classical guitar.
