= Saro Vera =

Christian priest from Paraguay

- Born: Saro Wilfrido Vera Troche; October 6, 1922; Caazapá Department, Paraguay
- Died: May 7, 2000 (aged 77); Asunción, Paraguay
- Occupation: Priest

Saro Wilfrido Vera Troche (October 6, 1922 – May 7, 2000) was a Paraguayan Christian priest.

== Childhood and youth ==
Vera was born on October 6, 1922, in Caazapá Department Paraguay, into a peasant family which held profound faith in religion. He received his primary education in Caazapá but there was a two-year gap in his studies due to the Chaco War in 1935. He studied his first year of classic high school in the Metropolitan Seminary of Asunción. At the age of thirteen, he joined the Metropolitan Seminary in Buenos Aires, where he studied philosophy and theology and earned his bachelor's degree.

He was ordained a priest in the same seminary on November 28, 1948. He returned to Paraguay in 1950 and spent the year preparing for a bachelor's degree in theology.

== First steps ==
Having assumed his role in the hierarchy of the Catholic Church, Vera decided not to be a priest in the town of Villarrica, but to work among the poor that belonged to the parish of Buena Vista. Subsequently he lived there for many years.

The archbishop of Asunción, Felipe Santiago Benitez, who prefaced the book The Evangelization of the Paraguayan, defined him as a thinker of the Paraguayan church. "In my view, the higher quality of our times," he said. He added that "many of his claims could be discussed or, perhaps, were not acceptable, but deserve our respect and admiration."

== Works ==
Saro Vera wrote several books during his lifetime, but not all of them have been published. In his book The Evangelization of the Paraguayan, Vera proposed a scientific study of the Paraguayan Catholic living a Christian life.

Another of his books is Six Stories of a Peasant. This book contains a prologue written by Helio Vera, who describes this collection of stories as a mixture of fiction and reality. The stories do not lose their testimonial character, as they are developed around the events involving the guerrillas which operated in the area where Saro Vera fulfilled his evangelical mission during the 1960s'. The prologue writers explain that perhaps this was his way of encouraging reflection and imparting education: "We drew the tortuous paths that our people had to go, pushed by the unstoppable dialectic of violence," said Vera.

Other titles published by Vera include Stories of Paraguay Locals. But in his book "The Paraguayan, a man outside his world", where he clearly defines the three famous laws, namely the mbareté (the tough), ñembotavy (the indifferent) and vaivai (the in-between), the tales are not stories but ways in which Paraguayans think and behave.

Saro Vera understood that "to know the national being, we need to discover the hidden reasons or deep motivations, immersed in the distance of time, in the subconscious and into unconsciousness." This material is of great significance for understanding Paraguayans.
