= General Higinio Morínigo =

- Location within Paraguay
- Coordinates: 25°57′0″S 55°55′12″W
- Country: Paraguay
- Department: Caazapá

Population (2008)
  - Total: 1 655

General Higinio Morínigo is a town in the Caazapá Department of Paraguay.

== Sources ==
- World Gazeteer: Paraguay – World-Gazetteer.com
