= Berta Rojas =

Paraguayan musician (born 1966)

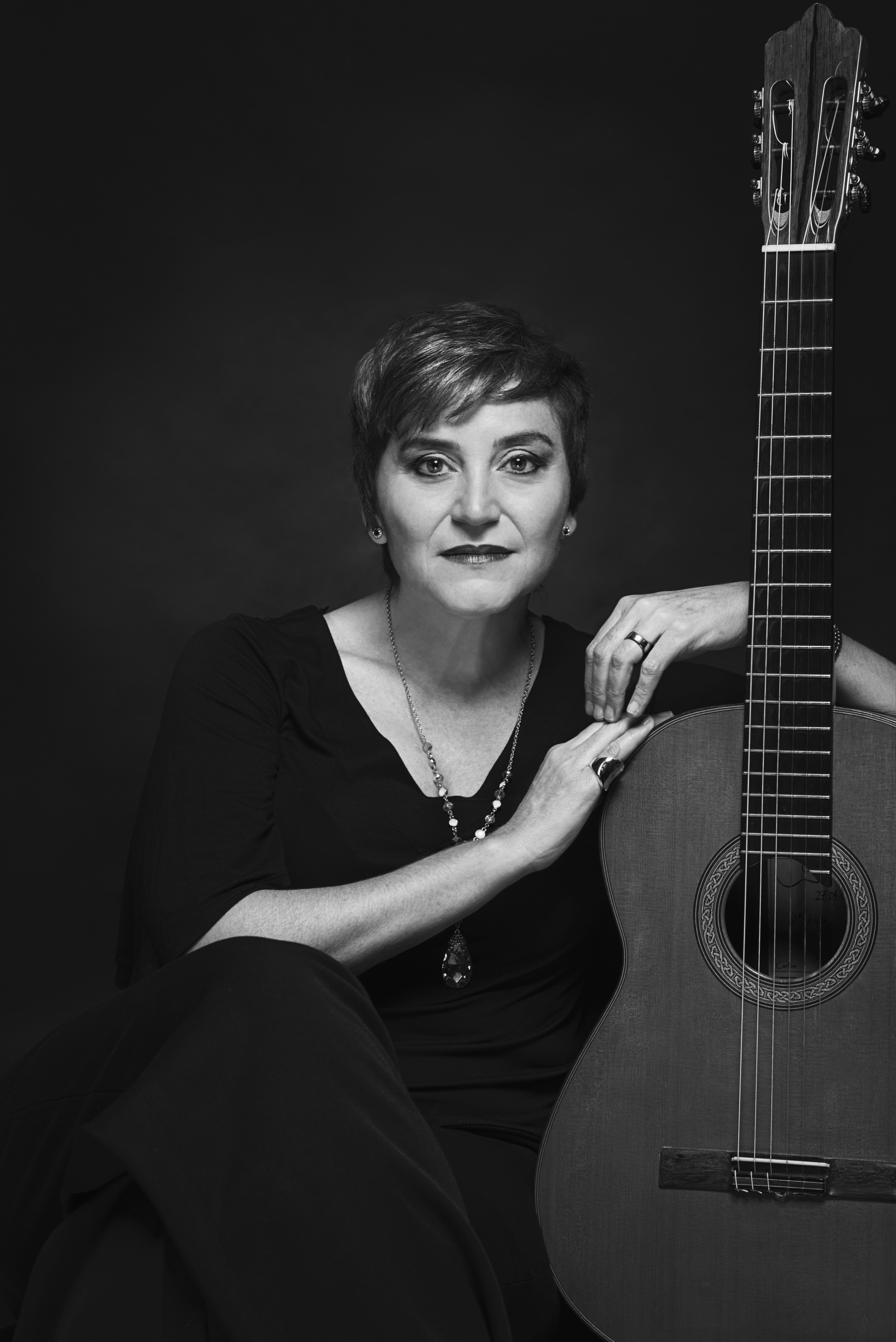

Background information
- Born: Berta Rojas; 23 September 1966 (age 60); Asunción, Paraguay
- Genre: Classical
- Occupations: Musician, professor
- Instrument: Guitar
- Years active: 1992–present
- Label: On Music Recordings
- Website: Berta Rojas

Berta Rojas (born 23 September 1966) is a Paraguayan classical guitarist. Her most recent album, "La Huella de las Cuerdas" (2025), is nominated for “Best Instrumental Album,” “Best Classical Composition” for "Tríptico Sudamericano" (composer: Elodie Bouny), and “Best Packaging Design” at the 27th Latin Grammy Awards (2026). She was awarded a Latin Grammy for her album "Legado" (2022) in the category of "Best Classical Album". The same album received another statuette for "Best Contemporary Classical Contemporary Composition" for Anido's Portrait, written by Sergio Assad. She has been nominated to the Latin Grammy on three other occasions: In 2012 she was nominated for Best Instrumental Album in the Latin Grammys for her album "Día y Medio (A Day and a Half)" which she recorded with Paquito D'Rivera. For her album "Salsa Roja", she was nominated at the 2014 Latin Grammy Awards in the category of Best Classical Album. She got her third nomination in the 16th Annual Latin Grammy Awards for Best Tango Album for her album "History of Tango", which she recorded with the iconic Camerata Bariloche.

== Background and education ==
Berta Rojas was praised for having "introduced a new dimension in the emotional reaches of the instrument", according to El País newspaper in 1991. Since then she has gone on to build an international career and was lauded by the Washington Post as a "guitarist extraordinaire" and by Classical Guitar Magazine as "ambassador of the classical guitar".

She had her first music lessons with guitarist Emiliano Aiub Riveros. She then studied guitar briefly with Carlos Vázquez, and began her formal education in classical guitar at age 10 under the instruction of Felipe Sosa and Violeta de Mestral. At the same time, she also studied piano with Rosa Mereles de López at the Jorge Báez Conservatory.

Rojas moved to Uruguay in 1986 to continue her studies with Uruguayan professor Abel Carlevaro. There she enrolled in the Escuela Universitaria de Música (Universidad de la República), where she obtained a Bachelor of Music in Classical Guitar, studying under guitarist Eduardo Fernández and Mario Paysée.

In 1996, Rojas was named a Fellow of the Americas by the Kennedy Center for the Performing Arts for her artistic excellence. This recognition helped her acquire the means to continue her formal education in the United States. That same year, she began her graduate studies at the Peabody Institute. In 1997 she received a scholarship from the Organization of American States which financed her remaining studies. She received a Master of Music from Peabody Institute under the instruction of Manuel Barrueco and Ray Chester. In 2000, Rojas received her Graduate Performance Diploma at the same institution under Barrueco and Julian Gray.

== Musical career ==
Rojas has performed at various venues around the world, including at the National Concert Hall in Dublin as a soloist with the Irish Radio and Television Orchestra (RTO), and on Belgian National Television with the Brussels Philharmonic Orchestra. Since 2011, Rojas has toured through 20 countries in the Americas with Cuban saxophonist and 11-time Grammy award winner Paquito D'Rivera on the "In the Footsteps of Mangoré" tour. Together, Rojas and D'Rivera recorded and released Día y Medio (A Day and a Half), an album which earned a nomination for "Best Instrumental Album" in the 13th Latin Grammy's in 2012. She has also frequently toured with Brazilian guitarist Carlos Barbosa-Lima.

Rojas' twelve regular studio recordings began with the 1998 album Intimate Barrios, that was included in Gramophone magazine's list of "the best recordings you can buy". Her 2006 release Cielo Abierto was praised by Soundboard magazine as "impeccable in every aspect of professionalism—heart-touching musical artistry, interesting repertoire and excellent technical production". 2009's Terruño has received excellent reviews by critics internationally. Steve Marsh of Classical Guitar Magazine commended Terruño for exhibiting a "poetic exquisiteness which many another player rarely attains".

In May 2015, Berta Rojas received the distinction of "Maestros del Arte", the "Embajadora Ilustre del Arte Musical" distinction by the Paraguayan Senate, and the award of "La Ordena Nacional al Mérito Comuneros", by the Chamber of Deputies Paraguay. On 18 May 2015 she released her album "History of Tango", along with the iconic Camerata Bariloche.

In 2016 the Autonomous University of Encarnación and the Universidad Americana of Asunción bestowed upon her Honorary Doctorate Degrees. And for her outstanding work on behalf of culture, the Ministry of Foreign Affairs awarded her the National Order of Merit "Don José Falcón" in 2017.

On 8 May 2017 she presented her album entitled "Felicidade", in homage to Brazilian music, with the collaboration of the outstanding artists Gilberto Gil, Toquinho and Iván Lins.

On 4 July 2017, she received the Carlos Colombino award, granted by the National Secretariat of Culture of Paraguay in recognition of her contribution to Paraguayan culture.

In August 2017 she became the first Latin American guitar teacher in the Guitar Department at the Berklee College of Music.

In June 2018 she joined the renowned Australian guitarist John Williams in a tribute to Agustín Barrios Mangoré at the Sam Wanamaker theater of the Shakespeare's Globe cultural complex in London.

In 2019, the National University of Asunción also granted her an honorary doctorate.

On May 24, 2022, she releases the recording material entitled "Legado" (Legacy), a tribute to the pioneering women of the classical guitar. The same year she received La Guitarra de Oro Award: A Life Dedicated to the Guitar, bestowed by the Giuseppe Verdi Conservatory of Milan. More recently in 2023, she was awarded with the National Order of Merit in the Grade of "Grand Cross", the highest degree of recognition granted by Paraguay.

On October 30, 2025, Berta released her latest album, entitled "La Huella de las Cuerdas" (The Journey of Strings), a comprehensive multimedia work that describes the cultural impact of the guitar in Latin America and rediscovers the links that, in different ways, unite it to the great family of string instruments on the continent. The multimedia project received three nominations at the 27th Latin Grammy Awards (2026): Best Instrumental Album (Berta Rojas); Best Classical Composition for *Tríptico Sudamericano* (composer: Elodie Bouny; Berta Rojas with Pedro Franco, Federico Tarazona, and Jorge Glem). Best Packaging Design (Celeste Prieto).

In July 2026, Berta received the José Tomás Honorary Guitarist Award, presented by the José Tomás – Villa de Petrer International Guitar Festival (Spain).

== Promoting development and appreciation of musical arts ==
Year	Activity
1994	Artistic director of the First Agustin Barrios International Guitar Competition and Festival, with the participation of John Williams, Graciela "Chelita" Pomponio, Richard Stover, Enrique Pinto, and Hopkinson Smith, among others (Paraguay)
1999	Artistic director of the City of Asuncion's Music Competition (Paraguay)
2002 and 2006	Artistic director of the Cardozo Ocampo Competition (Paraguay)
2007, 2008 and 2009	Artistic director of the Marlow Guitar International Youth Guitar Competition (formerly known as the John and Susie Beatty Music Scholarship Competition for Classical Guitar (Washington, DC, USA)
2007, 2008, 2009 and 2010	Artistic director of the Iberoamerican Guitar Festival (Washington, DC, USA)
2007, 2008, 2009, 2010 and 2011	Artistic director of the Latin American Harp Festival (Washington, DC, USA)
2009 and 2011	Founder and director of the Barrios World Wide Web Competition
2009, 2010, 2011, 2012, 2013, 2014, 2015, 2016, 2017 and 2018	Educational tour "Con Berta Rojas hoy toca Mangoré" Tour of Schools (Paraguay)
2011, 2012, 2013 and 2014	"In the Footsteps of Mangore" Tour (Uruguay, Argentina, Paraguay, Chile, Panama, Colombia, Puerto Rico, Trinidad and Tobago, Honduras, Costa Rica, Brazil, Guatemala, Mexico, French Guiana, Dominican Republic, Venezuela, Haiti, Martinique, Cuba and El Salvador)
2016, 2017, 2018	Guitar Orchestra "Pu Rory" Ensemble
2020, 2021, 2022	Original idea and direction of the musical composition "Jeporeka" project.

== Discography ==
- Berta Rojas interprets Agustin Barrios – Clave Ediciones. Paraguay, 1992
- Concierto Latinoamericano – Paraguay, 1995
- Concierto Latinoamericano – Dorian Recordings, USA, 1997
- Intimate Barrios – Dorian Recordings. USA, 1998
- Guitarra Adentro – Paraguay, 2002
- Cielo Abierto – ON Music Recordings. USA, 2006
- Alma y Corazón – ON Music Recordings. USA, 2007
- Flores de Asunción – ON Music Recordings. USA, 2008
- Paraguay According to Agustin Barrios – ON Music Recordings. USA, 2008
- Terruño – ON Music Recordings – USA, 2009
- Día y Medio – ON Music Recordings. USA, 2012
- Salsa Roja – ON Music Recordings. USA, 2013
- Historia del Tango (History of Tango) – ON Music Recordings. USA, 2015
- Felicidade (Happiness) – ON Music Recordings. USA, 2017
- Legado – ON Music Recordings. USA, 2022
- La Huella de las Cuerdas (The Journey of Strings) – ON Music Recordings. USA, 2025
