= First Synod of Asunción =

The First Synod of Asunción was a council of the Roman Catholic Church of the Diocese of Paraguay, in 1603. It was organized by the third bishop of the diocese, Friar Martín Ignacio de Loyola, in Asunción, gathering clergy and lay people from the eight cities of the Giant Province of the Indias.

The Synod adopted the catechism approved by the Third Council of Lima in 1583 and translated into the Guaraní language by Franciscan friar Luis de Bolaños, and made its use compulsory for the evangelization of the indigenous peoples of the Americas.
