= Yuty =

Yuty San Francisco de Yuty
- Town
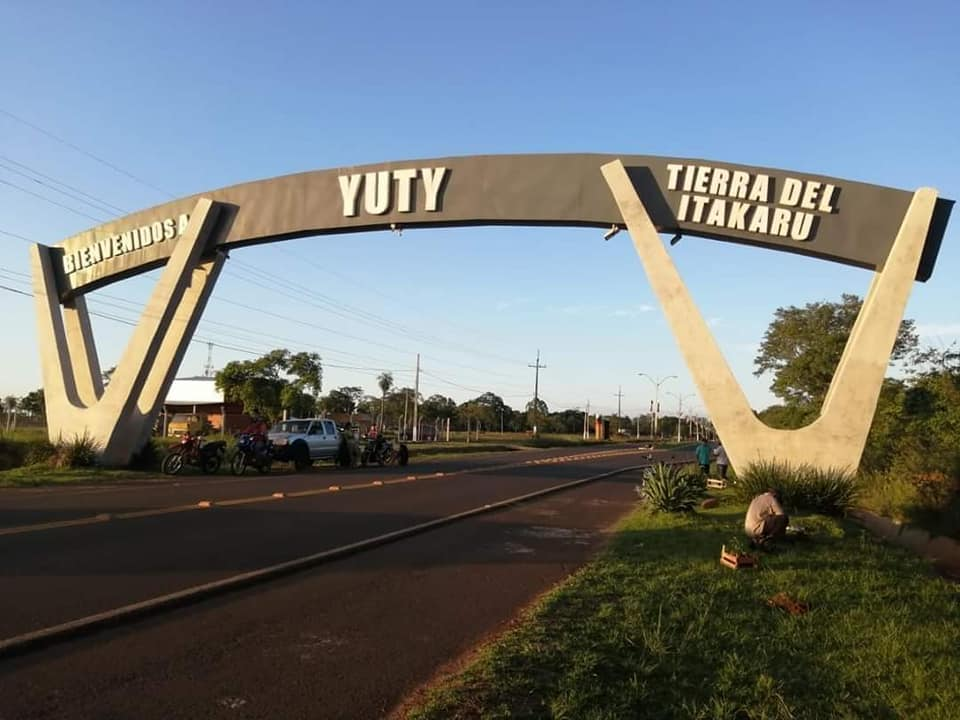
- Welcome arch at main entrance of the town.
- Nickname: Tierra del Itakuru
- Location within Paraguay
- Coordinates: 26°37′12″S 56°15′0″W
- Country: Paraguay
- Department: Caazapá Department
- Founder: Luis de Bolaños

Area
  - Total: 457 km^{2} (176 sq mi)

Population (2008)
  - Total: 5 551

Yuty (Guarani: Juty) is a town in the Caazapá Department of Paraguay. It is located 98km to the south of the department capital Caazapa and 330km to the South East of the national capital Asuncion.

Its name origin has two theories. The first claims it comes from the Guarani terms ju + ty (place of thorns). The second asserts that as the place used to be a reunion site and the natives when asked where they were coming from responded. "Ayu aty hagui" which means "I come from the meeting place" the contraction of that phrase supposedly evolved into the current name Yuty.

It was founded on October 4, 1611 by Spanish missionary Luis de Bolaños with the name of San Francisco de Yuty (Saint Francis of Yuty)

The main local crops are cotton and rice.

== Notable people ==
- Gustavo Adrián Ramírez (born 1990), footballer
- Tadeo Zarratea (born 1946), lawyer, activist, linguist, and novelist
- Amilcar Ferreira (born 1971) economist and politician

== Sources ==
- World Gazeteer: Paraguay – World-Gazetteer.com
