= Tadeo Zarratea =

Paraguayan lawyer and author (born 1946)

Tadeo Zarratea Dávalos (born 28 October 1946) is a Paraguayan lawyer, activist, linguist, and author. He became famous as the author of Kalaito Pombero, one of the first novels to ever be written in the Guarani language.

== Education ==
Tadeo Zarratea was born on 28 October 1946 in Yuty. He graduated as lawyer and linguist from the Universidad Nacional de Asunción.

== Selected works ==
- Kalaíto Pombéro. Asunción: Napa. 1981.
- Arandu Ka’aty. 1989.
- Ka’i Rembiasakue. 1994. (with Feliciano Acosta Alcaraz)
- Gramática elemental de la lengua guaraní. Asunción: Marben. 2002.
- Avañe’ẽ: manual para leer y escribir en guaraní. Asunción: Servilibro. 2013. (with Feliciano Acosta Alcaraz)
- Gramática elemental del guaraní paraguayo. Asunción: Servilibro. 2013.
