= Third Council of Lima =

Catholic doctrinal meeting in Peru

The Third Council of Lima was a council of the Roman Catholic Church in 1582–83 in Lima, at the time the capital of the Spanish Viceroyalty of Peru. It was the most important of the three councils celebrated in Lima during the 16th century, since it definitively organized the Church in the Americas. It was summoned by Archbishop Toribio de Mogrovejo in 1581, and met from 15 August 1582 to 18 October 1583.

== Results ==
The Council dictated many regulations and principles, centered on the evangelization of the aboriginals and their fair treatment "not like slaves but as free men", as well as their education and instruction in European customs. It decreed that the indigenous languages must be used, and forbade the use of Latin and the exclusive use of Spanish. It produced a trilingual catechism (then known as "Catechism of St. Toribius"), in Spanish, Quechua and Aymara. This catechism was later translated into the Guaraní language by Luis de Bolaños, and adopted by the First Synod of Asunción (1603) for use in the area of the Upper Paraná River basin (eastern Brazil, Paraguay and northeastern Argentina).

The Council also encouraged the establishment of seminaries. It set standards for the ordination of priests, requiring that they visit their congregations regularly, and for the appropriate use of liturgy to attract the natives to the celebrations.

The Council adopted a strongly anti-idolatrous tone, targeting obscene books in bishops' possessions for destruction. (Note: "Ban all the books that narrate or intentionally teach lecherous and obscene matters, for not only faith should be considered but also those customs that become easily corrupted.... Punish all the bishops who are in possession of these books....") The Council also ordered the complete destruction of quipu concerning non-Christian customs, (Note: "And, as among the Indians, ignorant of letters, there are certain signs with different strings instead of books, that they call quipos, which contain a considerable number of testimonies of ancient superstition in which they keep the secrets of their rites, ceremonies and laws, the bishops must be sure to destroy them completely, for they are pernicious instruments") while encouraging their manufacture for confessions (Note: "For your confession to be good, and please God, the first thing you have to do, my son, is to make a quipo, just like you make them when you are a tambo camayo, of what you give and what people owe you. So you make a quipo of what you have done against God and against others, and how many times, if many or a few.") and doctrinal memorization among the indigenous.
