= Caazapá Department =

Department of Paraguay

Caazapá Departamento de Caazapá (Spanish) Tetãvore Ka'asapa (Guarani)
- Department
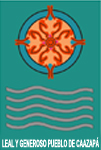
- Flag Coat of arms

- Coordinates: 26°12′S 56°23′W
- Country: Paraguay
- Capital: Caazapá

Government
  - Governor: Christian Sosa (ANR)

Area
  - Total: 9,496 km^{2} (3,666 sq mi)

Population (2022)
  - Total: 139,479
  - Density: 14.69/km^{2} (38.04/sq mi)
- Time zone: UTC-04 (AST)
  - Summer (DST): UTC-03 (ADT)
- ISO 3166 code: PY-6
- Number of Districts: 10

Caazapá (Spanish pronunciation: [ka(a)saˈpa]) is a department in Paraguay, with its capital in the city of the same name. The eastern region of Caazapá is relatively undeveloped, characterized by rolling hills and large areas of Brazilian Atlantic Forest situated between the San Rafael mountains to the south and the Ybytyruzú mountains to the north. Conversely, the western region consists of low-lying wetlands, marshes, and tributaries feeding into the Tebicuary River, the largest river in eastern Paraguay.

Several indigenous groups inhabit the remaining rainforest areas, particularly south of the highway connecting San Juan Nepomuceno and Tavaí. Among them are the Mbyá and Guayaki peoples, who live in small communities and practice subsistence farming under the forest canopy, cultivating corn, cassava, and yerba mate. Although many of their lands are designated as national reserves and theoretically protected by law, their territories face encroachment from illegal logging, ranching, and large-scale soybean cultivation by Brazilians.

== Districts ==
The department is divided in 11 districts:

District	Population (2002)		
District	Urban	Rural	Total
Abaí	2,640	23,535	26,175
Buena Vista	1,416	3,924	5,340
Caazapá	5,990	16,382	22,372
Doctor Moisés Bertoni	330	4,286	4,616
Fulgencio Yegros	1,067	4,891	5,958
General Higinio Morínigo	1,242	4,257	5,499
Maciel	431	3,526	3,957
San Juan Nepomuceno	6,937	17,306	24,243
Tavaí	656	12,698	13,354
Yuty	4,299	23,704	28,003
Tres de Mayo			

== History ==
The history of the department is closely tied to the early Franciscan missionaries in Paraguay, who established several reductions (reducciones) in the region. Notably, these missions successfully secured a ten-year exemption from the encomienda (patronage) system for the indigenous population, making them some of the earliest successful reductions in the Río de la Plata region.

The central and southern areas of Caazapá played a significant role in the colonial consolidation of Paraguay. The Franciscan presence in the missions of Yuty and Caazapá began in 1607 and expanded throughout the 17th and 18th centuries. In 1786, the San Juan Nepomuceno mission was founded, further expanding agricultural development and settlement in the region.

In 1906, Caazapá was officially established by law as the sixth department of Paraguay, with the city of Caazapá designated as its capital. The department's borders have remained unchanged since their last modification in 1973.

In the late 19th century, Australian colonists settled in this department to found a racist-socialist colony. A few descendants still remain, but the colony is considered a failure. One of the most notorious personalities that are descendant of these colonists is the comic book writer Robin Wood. Other famous people from Caazapá are:

- M. D. Pedro N. Ciancio, the first pediatrician of Paraguay, and who brought to the country the first grains of soy.
- M. D. Pedro Duarte Ortellado, creator of the Ministry of Health and its first minister.
- Félix Paiva, lawyer and President of the Republic between 1937 and 1939.
- Maria Concepción Leyes de Chávez, writer.
- Miguel Ángel Pangrazio, lawyer and writer.
- Ana Iris Chávez de Ferreiro, poet and writer.
- Felipe Sosa, guitar player.
- Father José de Jesús Aguirre, writer and psychologist.
- Monsignor Saro Vera, writer.

== Geography ==
=== Limits ===
To the North, it limits with the Guairá and Caaguazú departments, to the south with Itapúa, to the east with Alto Paraná and to the west with Misiones and Paraguarí.

=== Climate ===
The highest temperatures reach 37 °C and the lowest drop to 1 °C, the average is 21 °C. It is one of the departments with more quantity of precipitation.

=== Orography and soil ===
The soil is composed by sandstone from the Carboniferous period, of fluvial and glacial origin. The land form low hills with no more than 200 meters in height and rise towards the Ybyturuzú Cordillera.

The Caazapá Cordillera, Monte Rosario and San Rafael chain of mountains cross throughout the department from East to West, with some hills of medium high such as Mbatovi, Ñú Cañy, Pacurí and Morotí. This cordillera separates the land in two different regions, to the north-east, there are meadows, lagoons, swamps and fields for agriculture; to the south-east there are hills and forests.

=== Hydrography ===
The Tebicuary River crosses the department from East to West, also the South of the department and serves as limit with Itapúa department. The Tebicuary-mi River serves as limit with Paraguarí.

The Pirapó River flows into the Tebiacuary River, in the center area of the department. In Caazapá are the sources of two streams, Capiíbary and Ypety.

The streams Iñaro, Guazú and Charará are located in the territory of Caazapá as well.

=== Natural environment and vegetation ===
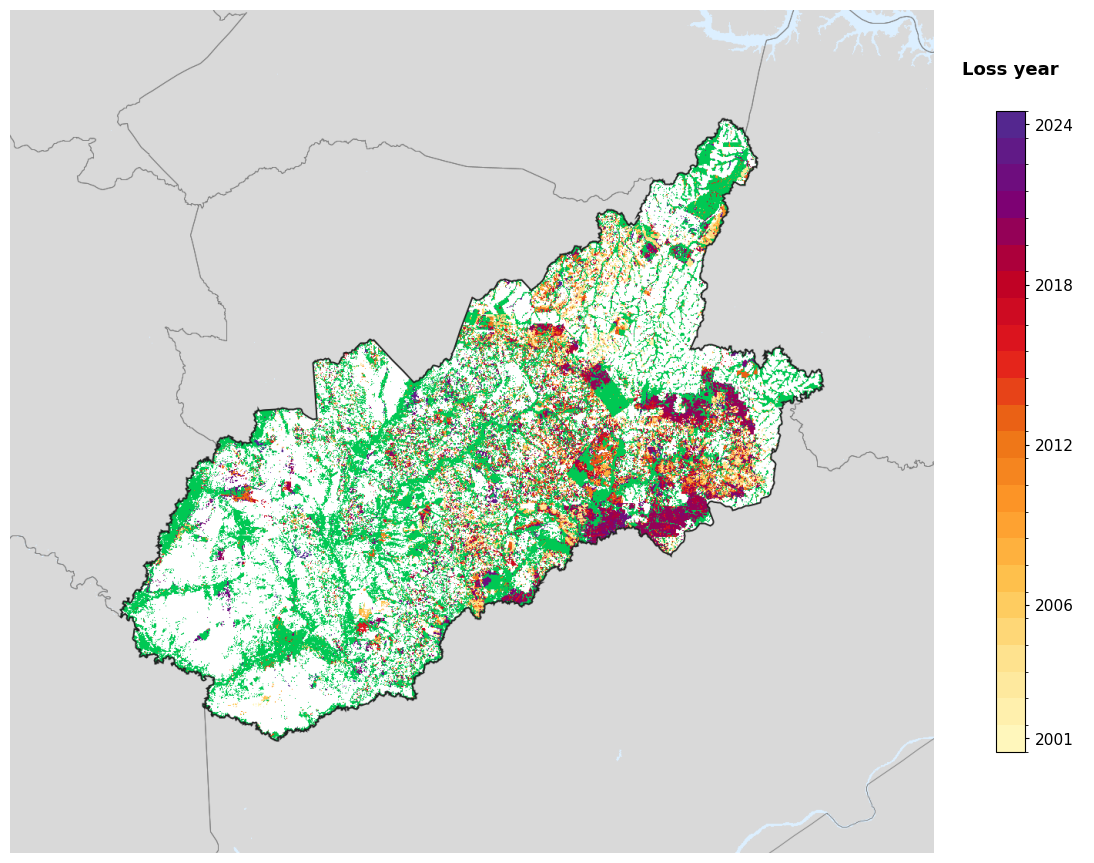
Tree-cover loss year in Caazapá, 2001-2024, from the Global Forest Change dataset.

The whole department is in the Central Forest Region. The wooded landscape has suffered the consequences of being used for breeding cattle and the abuse of technology that affects the soil, being both situations a problem for the natural environment in this area.

There are some vegetable species that are in danger, such as yvyra paje, yvyra asy and nandyta. Among the animal species in danger are the tiririca, margay, lobopé and aira’y.

The protected areas are:

- Caaguazú National Park, with 16,000 hectares.
- Golondrina Private Reserve, with 24,077 hectares.

== Tourism ==
Notable cultural landmarks include the Franciscan Museum in the departmental capital, which houses colonial religious art. The city is also home to Ykua Bolaños, a natural spring tied to a local religious legend. According to tradition, Friar Luis de Bolaños struck a rock to cause water to surge forth, a miracle intended to convince the indigenous population of the existence of God during an intense drought.

In the neighboring municipality of Maciel, the historical railway station preserves infrastructure from the country's former passenger railway system.

The department's topography features several prominent elevations, including the Mbatoví, Ñu Cañy, and Pacurí hills, alongside the Serranía del Rosario range. The regional hydrography, defined by the Tebicuary River and its tributaries, such as the Tebicuary-mí, Pirapó, and Capiibary rivers, serves as a primary source for local recreational activities and seasonal tourism.

== Economy ==
Caazapá is amongst the poorest departments in the eastern region of Paraguay.

Caazapá produces cotton, soy, sweet, cane, corn and manioc.

The forestall exploit was a great part of the department's economic activity 30 years ago, but has diminished in the later years.

There are not many industries in the region, but the few that exists, are dedicated to the processing of food, honey, sweet cane and starch.

== Communication and services ==
The most important way of access to the department is Route No. 8 “Dr. Blas Garay”, which joins the routes No 2 and 7 in Coronel Oviedo. It communicates Caazapá with the rest of the country.

The Carlos Antonio López railway used to cross the department from North to South, 96 kilometers of extension, and included the San Salvador – Abaí road.

The rivers that bathe Caazapá are navigable for small ships. The department also has airstrips for small and medium planes.

Caazapá also has several television and radio stations, such as Hechizo SRL, in AM and Yeruti Comunicaciones, Itacurú SRL, La Voz de Bolaños, Caazapá Poty, Tupa Renda, La Victoria SA, Aguaí Poty and 94.3 in FM.

There are 28.276 housings in the department, 5.765 in the urban area and 22.511 in the rural area. The percentage of which count with basic facilities are the following:

Electrical power: 16,1% Running water: 5,8% Trash recollection: 0,3%

== Education ==
The grade repetition rate in the first and second cycles of Basic General Education (EEB) is relatively high in Caazapá (6%).

Only 20% of teachers in Caazapá passed the written exams administered by the Ministry of Education and Sciences (MEC) to be included in the Database of Eligible Educators (BDEE). Of the 3,020 applicants, only 600 passed the exams held on November 19 and 20 as part of Operation 3.4 of the Public Competitive Examination.

Caazapá has 205 educational institutions, 402 elemental schools and 51 high schools.

The education in the department includes education about the natives of the country.

== Health ==
There are 48 health institutions in Caazapá, including hospitals and health care facilities. Most of them are public.
