= Kalaito Pombero =

1981 novel by Tadeo Zarratea

- Author: Tadeo Zarratea
- Language: Guarani
- Published: 1981
- Publisher: Napa
- Publication place: Paraguay
- Pages: 195

Kalaito Pombero is a 1981 novel by Paraguayan writer Tadeo Zarratea. It is one of the first novels to be ever written in the Guarani language, preceded just a year earlier by Mitã rerahaha (written by Juan Maidana).
