= Buena Vista, Paraguay =

Buena Vista
- Flag Coat of arms

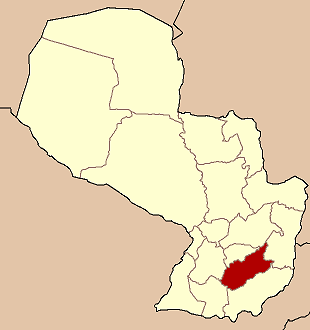
- Coordinates: 26°10′52″S 56°04′59″W
- Country: Paraguay
- Department: Caazapá
- Founded: June 25, 1945

Government
  - Intendente Municipal: Estanislao Silvero (PLRA)

Area
  - Total: 126 km^{2} (49 sq mi)
- Elevation: 138 m (453 ft)

Population (2022)
  - Total: 4,296
  - Density: 34.1/km^{2} (88.3/sq mi)
- Time zone: -4 Gmt
- Postal code: 5990

Buena Vista is a city in Caazapá Department, Paraguay. The beginning of this city was the result of the new political division of the country on June 25, 1945.

== Etymology ==
Its name describes the beautiful environment of the place.

== Geography ==
Buena Vista is 266 km away from Asunción, between San Juan Nepomuceno and Caazapá.

== Weather ==
Temperatures range from 21 °C to 37 °C in summer; in winter, the minimum is 1 °C. The city is located in one of the regions with the most precipitation, which is why it is the best place for farming and cattle raising.

== Economy ==
The main activity is farming and cattle raising.

== Bibliography ==
- Geografía Ilustrada del Paraguay, Distribuidora Arami SRL; 2007. ISBN 99925-68-04-6
- Geografía del Paraguay, Primera Edición 1999, Editorial Hispana Paraguay SRL
