= Yegros =

- Location within Paraguay
- Coordinates: 26°27′36″S 56°24′36″W
- Country: Paraguay
- Department: Caazapá
- Established: 17 diciembre 1891

Population (2008)
  - Total: 1 246

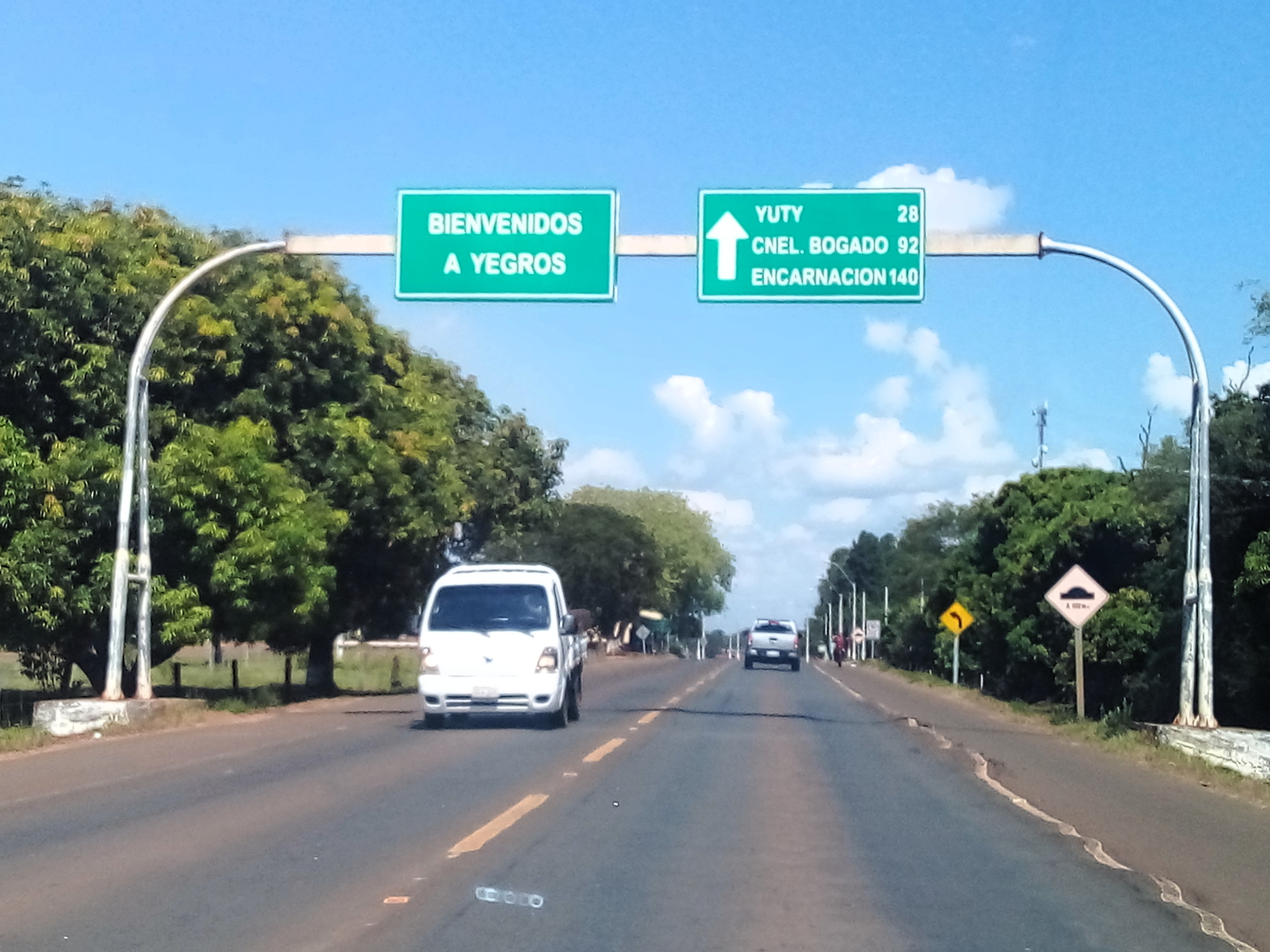
Access to Fulgencio Yegros via Route PY08

Yegros is a town in the Caazapá department of Paraguay.

== Sources ==
- World Gazeteer: Paraguay – World-Gazetteer.com
