= Tavaí =

Tavaí Tava'i (Guarani)
- Location within Paraguay
- Coordinates: 26°28′48″S 56°21′0″W
- Country: Paraguay
- Department: Caazapá

Population (2008)
  - Total: 812

Tavaí (Guarani: Tava'i) is a village in the Caazapá department of Paraguay.

== Sources ==
- World Gazeteer: Paraguay – World-Gazetteer.com
