= Mbaracayú =

- Location within Paraguay
- Coordinates: 25°1′12″S 54°48′0″W
- Country: Paraguay
- Department: Alto Paraná

Population (2008)
  - Total: 565
- Climate: Cfa

Mbaracayú is a town in the Alto Paraná department of Paraguay.

== Sources ==
- World Gazeteer: Paraguay – World-Gazetteer.com
