= Doctor Moisés Santiago Bertoni =

- Flag Coat of arms

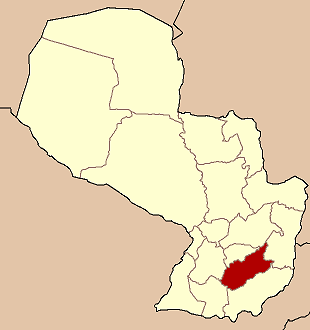
- Coordinates: 26°22′12″S 56°26′24″W
- Country: Paraguay
- Department: Caazapá
- Founded: 1880

Government
  - Intendente Municipal: Blas Reinoso Candia Troche
- Elevation: 116 m (381 ft)

Population (2008)
  - Total: 460
  - Density: 7/km^{2} (18/sq mi)
- Time zone: -4 Gmt
- Postal code: 5680

Moisés Santiago Bertoni or Doctor Moisés Bertoni is a village in the Caazapá department of Paraguay.

== Toponymy ==
This town was formerly called Estación Sosa (Sosa Station), located between Caazapa and Yuty and founded around 1880. It was named Doctor Moisés Bertoni on July 27, 1931 by the Decree Nº 40.843, stated by the Executive Power, signed by the president José P. Guggiari, in memory of Swiss scientist Moisés Santiago Bertoni. The first Economical Administrative Board was composed by: Carlos Antonio López Guerrero. Members: Sixto Real and Basilicio Núnez. Alternate members: Guillermo Flores and Daniel Duarte

== Geography ==
Moisés Bertoni is located at 260 km from Asunción, between Caazapa and Yuty. At the northeast of the town there is the Caaguazú range and the Brazilian Central plateau, the altitude of the area is lower than 400 m., there are lower hills formed by red sandstones and deep valleys until get close to the Paraná River.

All this land is irrigated by the Ypety River, which main characteristics are of subtropical forest situated on a kind of red granulated sandstones (laterita) lands and an extension of the Brazilian forest. There are windings and at the northeast there is a big plateau, the Tebycuary, between the Tebycuary river and its affluent the Tebycuarymi; they are low lands covered by recent sediments whose very little permeability allows the formation of extensive wetlands (esteros), marshy areas and open places where there is a great profusion of palm trees, extensive formations of isolated herbages, and trees. All of the rivers are affluent of the Paraguay River.

=== Climate ===
The average temperature is 21°C; the maximum temperature is 37°C in the summer and the minimum, 1°C in the winter. It is located in one of the departments with the highest level of rainfall, which is why the zone is excellent for the agricultural production.

== Demography ==
Moisés Bertoni has 5.002 inhabitants, of which 2.625 are males and 2.377 are females, according to the projections made by The General Direction in Statistics, Surveys and Census. (Projection 2008)

== Economy ==
The main economical activity is the cattle raising and farming. There are wide plantation of eucalyptol, citrus fruits and sugar cane. Part of the population located on the Tebycuarymi River banks is devoted to the fishing for self-consuming as well as for selling in the capital of the department.

== Transportation ==
It is located at 260 km from Asunción. There are two transportation companies “La Yuteña” and “Tebicuary”, which drives at different schedules with routes up to Asunción and Encarnación, by the Route 8.

== Tourism ==
In downtown, the train station is a tourist attraction.

It is possible to make ranch tourism in places such as “Estancia Loma Linda”, which offers lodging for tourist, swimming pools facilities; one can make rural activities, besides horse riding rides.

On Tebicuarymi River there are a lot of beaches for vacationers in summer times.

In October it is celebrated the patronal feast in honor to Saint Teresa de Jesús with entertaining activities like horse races, bullfights and a particular game called “sortija”, and a festival called “Isla Susu” with national, international and local artists. It is carried out a horse race feast called “Jineteada” every February 24 in “La Compañia Santa Teresa” counting with the presence of all the association in the country.
