= Branislava Sušnik =

Slovenian-Paraguayan anthropologist

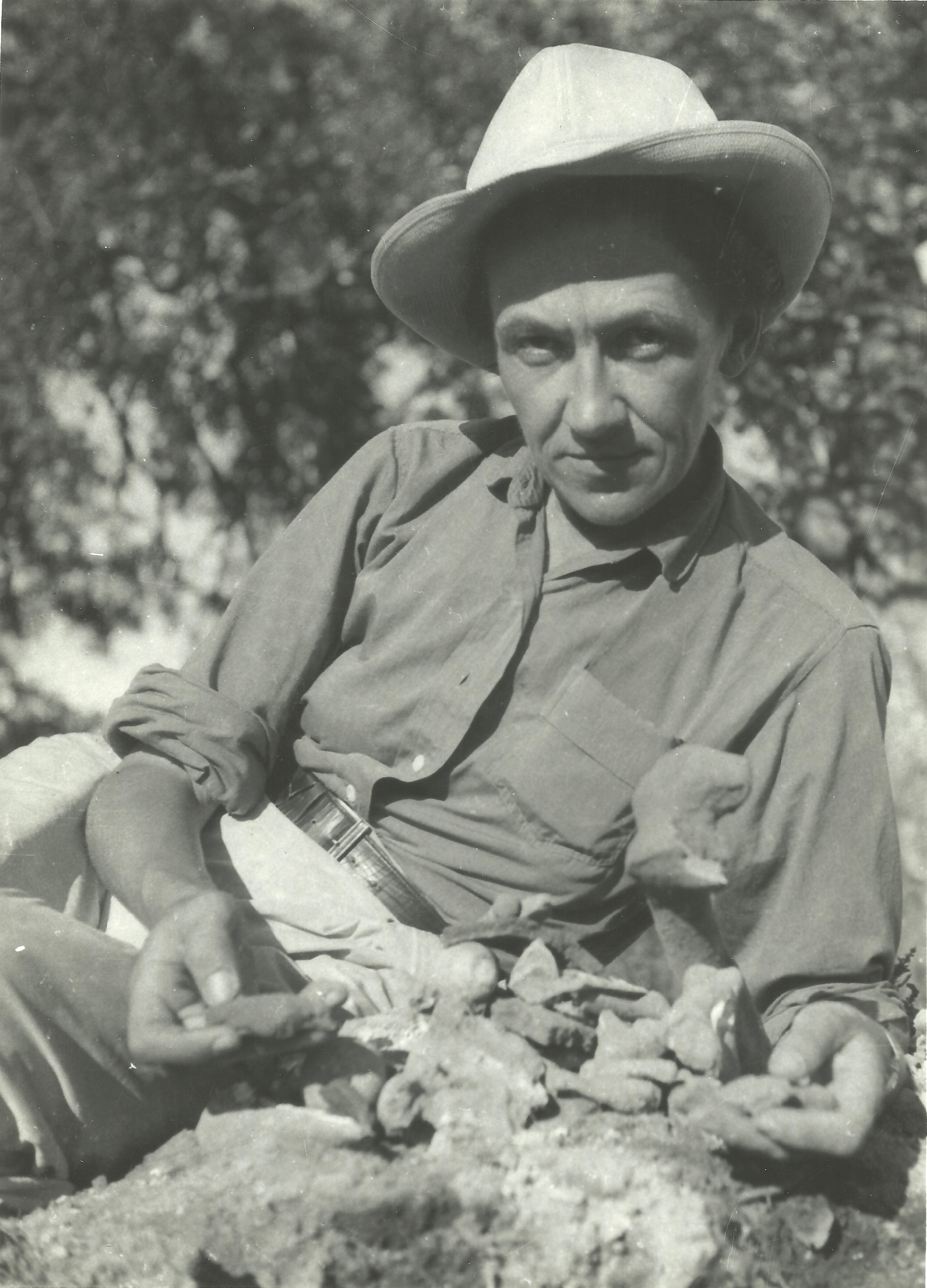
- Born: 28 March 1920; Medvode, Slovenia
- Died: 28 April 1996 (aged 76); Asunción, Paraguay
- Citizenship: Slovenia, Paraguay
- Known for: over 77 works, including articles, essays and books
- Scientific career
- Fields: anthropology, ethnology, ancient languages

Branislava Sušnik (28 March 1920, in Medvode, Slovenia – 28 April 1996, in Asunción, Paraguay) was a Slovenian-Paraguayan anthropologist.

== Life and education ==
Branislava Sušnik was born on 28 March 1920 in Medvode, Kingdom of Yugoslavia, currently in Slovenia to the lawyer Jože Sušnik and Karolina née Prijatelj. She attended primary school and classical grammar school in Ljubljana, and in 1937 entered Ljubljana University where she studied prehistory and history at the Faculty of Arts. In 1942, Sušnik completed her doctoral studies in ethnohistory and Ural-Altaic linguistics with the German anthropologist prof. Wilhelm Schmidt in Vienna (which was then part of Germany) and began studying the cultures and languages of Asia Minor at the Pontifical Biblical Institute in Rome. In addition to history and anthropology, she studied ethnology, prehistory, ancient languages and scripts.

After completing her studies in Rome, Sušnik returned to Ljubljana. Her father Jože Sušnik was murdered at the beginning of the Second World War and when she tried to escape to Italy, she was caught and imprisoned in the Ajdovščina prison. At the end of 1945, Sušnik left the country and spent some time in a refugee camp in Lienz in Austrian Carinthia, which she was able to leave after the intervention of the Jesuits and go to Rome.

== Work ==
In 1947, Sušnik emigrated to Argentina, having learnt Spanish during a month-long boat trip. In Argentina she began field research work at Laishi Mission in Los Tobas de Formosa, writing her first linguistic work in America.

On 1 March 1951, Sušnik at the invitation of the founder of the Ethnographic Museum, Andrés Barbero, she went to Asunción, Paraguay. After his death in 1952, she took over the management of the museum and ran it until her death in 1996. Sušnik reorganized the museum and enlarged its collection, while also running the richest library on indigenous peoples in Latin America.

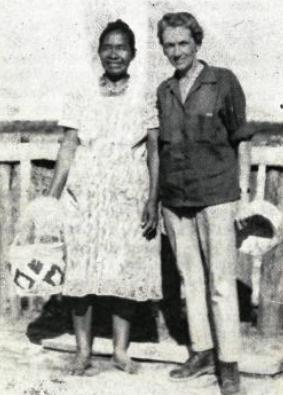
Branislava Sušnik in Paraguay

For 20 years, Sušnik headed the Department of American Archeology and Ethnology at the Faculty of Arts of the University of Asunción. During her scientific career Sušnik wrote 77 works, including articles, essays and books. Her best-known texts are "The Aborigines in Paraguay", "The role of indigenous people in the formation and experience of Paraguay", "The colonial Indian of Paraguay", "Notes on Paraguayan Ethnography", etc.

In 1992, Sušnik received the highest Paraguayan awards for scientific achievements. Also she was posthumously awarded the title of Gran Official of Paraguay for her creative contributions to the formation of the Paraguayan identity.

Branislava Sušnik died on 28 April 1996 in Asunción, Paraguay.

In 2005, the Paraguayan Post issued a stamp with Sušnik's portrait. In 2009, a street in Asunción was named after her. In 2020, the Ministry of Foreign Affairs of Slovenia honored Sušnik by organizing special events at certain diplomatic missions and consular post on the occasion of her birth centenary.

== Selected works ==
- 1965 - El indio colonial del Paraguay
- 1968 – Chiriguanos
- 1969 - Chamacocos
- 1975 - Dispersión Tupí-Guarani prehistórica: ensayo analitico
- 1977 - Lengua-maskoy, su hablar, su pensar, su vivencia
- 1978 - Los aborígenes del Paraguay
- 1986 - Artesanía indigena: ensayo analítico
- 1990 - Una visión socio-antropológica del Paraguay del siglo XVIII
- 1990 - Guerra, transito, subsistencia: ámbito americano
- 1995 - Los indios del Paraguay
