= Luis de Bolaños =

Spanish missionary evangelist

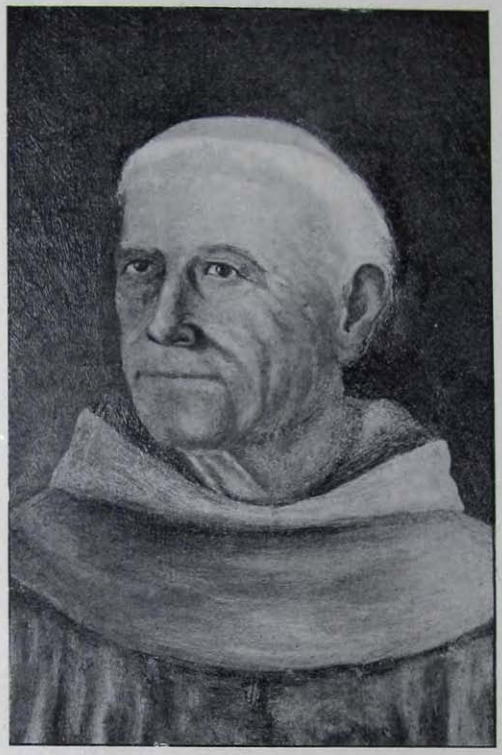
Photograph of Luis Bolaños published in El Plata Séráfico (November and December 1904, Year V, numbers 63-64).

Luis de Bolaños (1549? – 11 October 1629) was a Spanish Franciscan friar and missionary evangelist, initiator of the system of reductions (indigenous towns) in Paraguay and northeastern Argentina.

== Early life ==
Bolaños was born in Marchena, Seville, and entered the Franciscan order while he was very young, studying until he became a deacon. Friar Alonso de San Buenaventura passed by his convent looking for missionaries to work in South America, and Bolaños joined his group. Twenty-two Franciscans departed from Spain in the 1572 expedition of the Adelantado Juan Ortiz de Zárate. They arrived in Asunción (the present-day capital of Paraguay) in 1575.

== Career ==
Bolaños was ordained a priest in 1585. For fifty years he worked on the evangelization of the Guaraní aboriginals. He created the system of reductions, settlements populated by natives and overseen by the friars of the Order, of which the Jesuit Reductions would then become their most renowned examples. These towns "reduced" the originally nomadic natives to fixed, stable locations, allowing the missionaries to better control and catechize them, while teaching them to read and write, to cultivate the land, to domesticate animals, and to create manual artistic works. The Franciscan friar founded reductions all over the basin of the Paraná River, in Paraguay, large parts of Brazil, and the Argentine provinces of Misiones and northern Corrientes.

Bolaños also wrote the first grammar and lexicon of the Guaraní language, which were extremely useful for other missionaries. The Catechism approved by the Third Council of Lima in 1583 was translated by him. The First Synod of Asunción (1603) dictated that it be employed to teach Christian doctrine to the natives. Bolaños did not only teach by himself, but also employed selected natives to teach others.

In 1607 he founded the city of Caazapá.

== Later life and death ==
Near the end of his life, Bolaños retired to the convent of Saint Francis in Buenos Aires, where he died in 1629, at the age of 80.
