= Capiíbary =

- Location within Paraguay
- Coordinates: 24°48′0″S 56°2′24″W
- Country: Paraguay
- Department: San Pedro

Population (2008)
  - Total: 3 899
- Climate: Cfa

Capiibary is a town in the San Pedro department of Paraguay.

== Etymology ==
The city gets its name from the Capiibary River, which was named Capiĭbarĭ (compound from capiĭbá·r "capybara" and ĭ "water, river") in Classical Guarani by the natives due to the abundance of these animals in the river. With time, the original pronunciation got mixed together with the Spanish reading of the name, thus producing the final form "Kapi'ivary," even in modern Guarani.

== Sources ==
- World Gazeteer: Paraguay – World-Gazetteer.com
