= Caazapá =

Caazapá Ka'asapa
- City
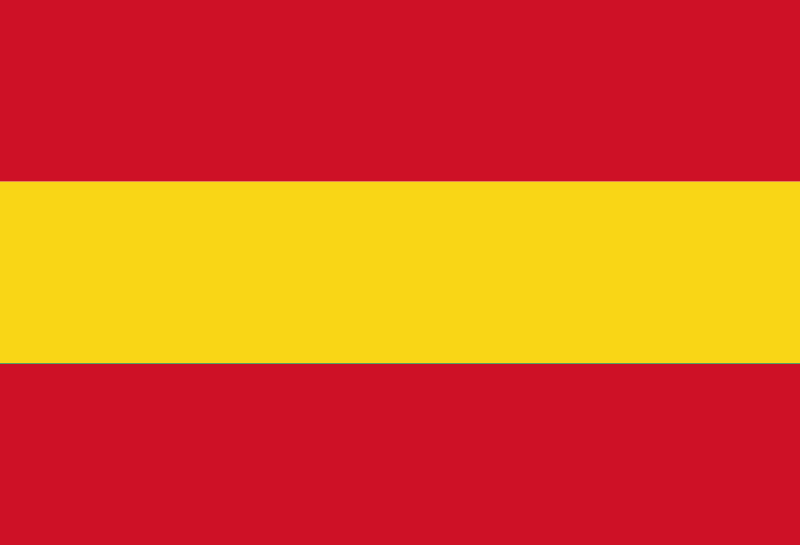
- Flag

- Location within Paraguay
- Coordinates: 26°12′00″S 56°22′48″W
- Country: Paraguay
- Department: Caazapá
- Founded: January 10, 1607 by Luis de Bolaños

Government
  - Intendente Municipal: Víctor Manuel López Espínola

Area
  - Total: 944 km^{2} (364 sq mi)
- Elevation: 155 m (509 ft)

Population (2008)
  - Total: 23,996
  - Density: 25.4/km^{2} (65.8/sq mi)
- Time zone: UTC-04 (AST)
  - Summer (DST): UTC-03 (ADT)
- Postal code: 5600
- Area code: (595) (542)
- Climate: Cfa

Caazapá (Spanish pronunciation: [ka(a)saˈpa]; Guarani: Ka'asapa) is a city in Paraguay, founded in 1607 by Friar Luis de Bolaños. It is located in the Caazapá District and is the capital of the Caazapá Department. There are five neighborhoods called "Barrios" in the city: The main one is called the Barrio San Pablo, and the other 4 are Barrio Santa Teresita, Barrio San Blás, Barrio San Antonio, and Barrio San Roque-within which is the original Chapel, built by Franciscans during the Spanish rule in Paraguay. The Franciscan mission at Caazapá was an important event in Paraguayan cultural heritage.

Some attractions are the Church, the Ykua Bolaños (Bolaños lagoon) and the Museum Juan Bernardo that contains the cross in which missionary Juan Bernardo Colman was executed.

== Etymology ==
The city gets its name from the Spanish mission of the Franciscan Order originally located in it. The latter was called Caaçapá in Classical Guarani, meaning "[the place] after the forest." This was due to the natives' belief that somewhere beyond the forest God, through Friar Luis de Bolaños, had made water spring out.

== Climate ==
Caazapá has a humid subtropical climate (Köppen: Cfa) with hot summers and warm winters

Climate data for Caazapá (1991–2020)
Month	Jan	Feb	Mar	Apr	May	Jun	Jul	Aug	Sep	Oct	Nov	Dec	Year
Record high °C (°F)	40.6 (105.1)	40.0 (104.0)	40.0 (104.0)	36.4 (97.5)	35.0 (95.0)	33.0 (91.4)	34.0 (93.2)	37.5 (99.5)	41.5 (106.7)	42.0 (107.6)	41.0 (105.8)	40.2 (104.4)	42.0 (107.6)
Mean daily maximum °C (°F)	32.9 (91.2)	32.2 (90.0)	30.9 (87.6)	28.1 (82.6)	24.1 (75.4)	22.6 (72.7)	22.4 (72.3)	24.8 (76.6)	26.4 (79.5)	28.5 (83.3)	30.1 (86.2)	32.0 (89.6)	27.9 (82.2)
Daily mean °C (°F)	26.6 (79.9)	26.0 (78.8)	24.9 (76.8)	22.2 (72.0)	18.6 (65.5)	17.4 (63.3)	16.7 (62.1)	18.7 (65.7)	20.3 (68.5)	22.9 (73.2)	24.1 (75.4)	26.0 (78.8)	22.0 (71.6)
Mean daily minimum °C (°F)	21.8 (71.2)	21.4 (70.5)	20.2 (68.4)	17.6 (63.7)	14.2 (57.6)	12.9 (55.2)	11.6 (52.9)	13.2 (55.8)	15.1 (59.2)	18.1 (64.6)	19.0 (66.2)	21.1 (70.0)	17.2 (63.0)
Record low °C (°F)	13.0 (55.4)	11.6 (52.9)	8.8 (47.8)	5.5 (41.9)	0.5 (32.9)	−1.0 (30.2)	−2.0 (28.4)	1.6 (34.9)	2.4 (36.3)	8.5 (47.3)	7.0 (44.6)	10.8 (51.4)	−2.0 (28.4)
Average precipitation mm (inches)	138.1 (5.44)	128.5 (5.06)	141.4 (5.57)	157.6 (6.20)	162.5 (6.40)	110.7 (4.36)	81.9 (3.22)	77.3 (3.04)	109.0 (4.29)	201.2 (7.92)	176.6 (6.95)	162.7 (6.41)	1,647.5 (64.86)
Source: NOAA

== Notable people ==
- Robin Wood. Comic book writer
- Felix Paiva. President of Paraguay
- Eduardo Schaerer. President of Paraguay
