= Insurgency in Paraguay =

Low-level armed conflict started in 2005

- Part of the spillover of Colombian conflict
- Area in Paraguay with insurgent activity.
Date	27 August 2005 – present (21 years, 2 months, 3 weeks and 1 day)
Location	Northern Paraguay: Amambay Department; Canindeyú Department; Concepción Department; San Pedro Department
Status	Ongoing low-level conflict

Belligerents
Paraguay; Armed forces; Police; Joint Task Force (FTC); Justicieros de la Frontera	Paraguayan People's Army (EPP); Armed Peasant Association (ACA) (Note: ACA was active from 2014 until 2016, when most of its members and leaders were killed. The group was effectively defunct after this point, but was revived sometime in 2017 by members of the EML. The refounded group was believed to have become defunct by mid-2024.); Army of Marshal López (EML; 2016-2026)

Commanders and leaders
(Paraguay) Pedro Alliana (2026–present); Former commanders: (Paraguay) Nicanor Duarte; (Paraguay) Fernando Lugo; (Paraguay) Federico Franco; (Paraguay) Horacio Cartes; (Paraguay) Mario Abdo Benítez; (Paraguay) Santiago Peña	Manuel Cristaldo Mieres; Magna Meza (WIA); Alcides Oviedo Brítez (POW); Carmen Villabla (POW); Osmar Martínez †; Bernardo Bernal Maíz †; Osvaldo Villalba †; Albino Jara Larrea †; Alfredo Jara Larrea †; Idilio Morínigo †; Alejandro Ramos †

Strength
3,500 active personnel	150–200; ~20; ~20

Casualties and losses
- 170+ deaths and 130+ injured 6,000 displaced

The insurgency in Paraguay, also known as the Paraguayan People's Army insurgency and the EPP rebellion (from the group's name in Spanish: Ejército del Pueblo Paraguayo), is an ongoing low-level armed conflict in northeastern Paraguay. Between 2005 and the summer of 2014, the EPP campaign resulted in at least 145 deaths, the majority of them local ranchers, private security guards, and police officers, along with several insurgents. During that same period the group perpetrated 28 kidnappings for ransom and a total of 85 "violent acts".

The insurgency began in 2005, after several members of the Patria Libre party formed the Paraguayan People's Army (EPP). The Government of Paraguay suspects the EPP has ties to the Colombian rebel group FARC. Two splinter groups of the EPP, the Armed Peasant Association (ACA) and the Army of Marshal López (EML), have also launched separate armed campaigns against the government.

== History ==
=== Background ===
The 1989 fall of the Stroessner dictatorship in Paraguay fueled the rapid development of previously banned, left-wing political groups. In 1990 current EPP leader Oviedo Britez enrolled in the theology faculty of the Catholic University of Asuncion.

=== Formation of the EPP ===
In 1992 Britez was expelled from the theology study course, becoming increasingly interested in political change through revolutionary armed struggle. Britez, Juan Arrom Suhurt and Britez's fiancée Carmen Villalba soon created the core of Partido Patria Libre, Paraguayan People's Army's precursor. Between 1995 and 1996 Britez and Villalba allegedly received military training from Chile's Manuel Rodríguez Patriotic Front.

In 1997 MPL carried its first act of expropriation by unsuccessfully attempting a bank robbery in the town of Choré. All six robbers were detained by a local police unit, and later received a three-year sentence. Following the release of its members in early 2000, MPL launched a recruiting campaign and adopted kidnapping as its main source of funds.

Its first significant action was the 2001 kidnapping of María Edith Bordón de Debernardi. Her husband, businessman Antonio Debernardi, paid $1 million for her release. On 2 July 2004, police captured Oviedo Britez and Carmen Villalba in Ñemby, on the outskirts of Asunción. A search of the couple's house in the city of San Lorenzo followed the arrest; intelligence materials and operating manuals were seized. Following Britez's and Villalba's detention, Osmar Martínez and Osvaldo Villalba became EPP's new field commanders.

=== Major actions ===
In 2004, the group kidnapped Cecilia Cubas, the daughter of former president of Paraguay Raúl Cubas. Despite receiving a ransom of $300,000, the kidnappers killed her. After the PPL was taken apart by security forces in 2005, several members decided to form a new group with which to continue the armed struggle, adopting its current name in 2008.

EPP's ideology was first outlined in a book called "Francist 21st Century Revolution", written by Britez in prison. The book is named after Jose Gaspar Rodriguez de Francia, a dictator who ruled over Paraguay between 1814 and 1841, and incorporates elements of Bolivarianism and Marxism–Leninism. The majority of EPP's members reportedly belong to eight families. Despite its limited size, EPP enjoys the support of the local population in the areas that it controls.

=== Later developments ===
Apart from the use of abductions EPP also engaged in cattle raiding, extortion, robberies and drug trade operations. The latter was facilitated with the aid of FARC; although EPP initially only extorted drug producers, reports indicate the presence of EPP's own marijuana plantations. An EPP communique denied any involvement in the drug trade, accusing the government of propaganda.

In August 2014 EPP agents Albino Larrea and Alfredo Jara Larrea formed a splinter faction known as ACA. ACA's initial strength amounted to 13 fighters, but as many as five of their fighters were allegedly killed in clashes with security forces in September 2014. The ACA was rendered defunct by 2016 after the remainder of its militants were killed by the government in 2015. An additional EPP splinter faction formed called Ejército de Mariscal López (EML), some of whose members later reconstituted ACA in 2017. Having suffered a major defeat in 2021, the refounded ACA was described as a defunct group by mid-2024.

In 2015 former comrade of the EPP founders and ex-member Cristóbal Olazar criticized the Paraguayan government for using the EPP as a resource, and not honestly trying to end their existence. He argues that the government use their existence as an excuse to expand government resources and corrupt officials participate in EPP drug trafficking.

By 2018 the EPP began staging attacks against Mennonite communities located in areas strategic to marijuana trafficking. These areas are also contested by Brazilian gangs Comando Vermelho, and Primeiro Comando da Capital.

== Timeline ==
=== 2005 ===
- On 27 August, a pair of policemen encountered an EPP column in the area of Yasy Cañy, Canindeyú. The resulting skirmish led to the death of one policeman.

=== 2008 ===
- On 31 July, a group of five militants abducted farm owner Luis Alberto Lindstron; the incident took place in the zone of Kuruzú de Hierro. Two rebels were wounded after a firefight with security forces that took place as the kidnappers were withdrawing.
- On 12 September, Alberto Lindstron was released from captivity after his relatives paid a $120,000 ransom.

=== 2009 ===
- On 1 August, police discovered an EPP forest encampment in the Concepción department. The occupants managed to escape after briefly firing shots. Food, plans for future activities, and approximately $27,900 were seized.
- On 29 August, EPP militants detonated an IED at the Paraguayan Palace of Justice. The explosion caused minor property damage.
- On 15 October, insurgents abducted Fidel Zavala, a rancher from the region of Concepción. Before leaving, the rebels booby-trapped Zavala's vehicle; two policemen were wounded while investigating his disappearance.
- On 31 December, EPP members attacked a small military outpost in the San Pedro department, stealing weapons and burning it to the ground.

=== 2010 ===
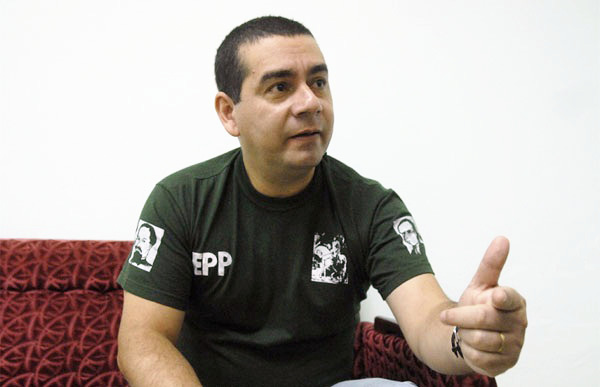
Oviedo Brítez, current EPP leader

- In early January, Fidel Zavala was freed from captivity following a ransom of $550,000. Thirty cattle were also distributed among Concepción's poor communities.
- On 21 April, a shootout between EPP members and security forces in Arroyito left one policeman and three private guards dead.
- In May, four security guards were killed by EPP militants after accidentally discovering an EPP encampment. Following the incident, a 30-day state of emergency was declared in five provinces, with 3,000 soldiers and police deployed to combat the rebels.
- In July, EPP member Severiano Martinez was killed in a shootout with police.
- On 22 September, in Hugua Ñandú, Paraguay, an armed assailant fired upon a police patrol vehicle. The attack damaged the windows of the vehicle but caused no casualties. No group claimed responsibility for the attack, but authorities suspected the EPP was responsible for the attack.
- On 24 September, high-ranking EPP members Nimio Cardozo and Gabriel Zárate Cardozo were killed in a police operation.

=== 2011 ===
- On 12 January, in the Carlos Antonio López Square and the Cerro Cora television facilities in the Saxony area of Asunción, unknown militants placed an improvised explosive device in a trash can. Subsequently, the police discovered and deactivated the IED safely, preventing casualties or damage to property. No group claimed responsibility, although the authorities believed that the EPP was responsible.
- On 17 January, explosive devices planted by EPP militants injured five people in the town of Horqueta.
- In April, a police officer and three ranch workers were killed by EPP militants.
- On 25 January, in San Juan Nepomuceno, Caazapá, local politician Julio Rubén Pereira was kidnapped by militants of the EPP. The EPP demanded a million dollars from the Pereira family for his release or, as an alternative, demanded that the Paraguayan government release Miguel López Perito, leader of the Cabinet and the April 10 Movement in exchange for Pereira. On 29 January, around 4:00 AM, Peira managed to escape captivity and returned home. The EPP claimed responsibility through an email.
- In May, Jesús Ortiz, an EPP logistics coordinator, was captured.
- In July, the EPP claimed responsibility for sabotaging a farm in the Concepción department, in which farm machinery was destroyed.
- On 21 September, two police officers were killed after a group of EPP militants attacked their outpost near Horqueta with explosives and automatic weapons. The insurgents reportedly stole weapons and ammunition from the encampment before fleeing.

=== 2012 ===
- In September, one policeman was killed and one was seriously injured after an EPP attack in the town of Azotey.
- On 15 June, 17 people, 6 policemen and 11 alleged EPP militants, were killed, 63 arrested and over 80 were injured and tortured in a battle in Curuguaty for illegal land occupation by the alleged militants.
- On 13 October, an explosive device detonated on the property of Arturo Urbieta, the local mayor, near Horqueta, Concepción. The device targeted a Paraguay National Administration of Electricity (ANDE) power transmission tower in the area. There were no reported casualties in the blast. The EPP claimed responsibility for the attack.
- On 16 November, authorities detained three members of the EPP's logistics branch in the area of Tacuatí.

=== 2013 ===
- On 19 February, gunmen opened fire on Benjamin Lezcano outside his home in Concepción, Concepción. Lezcano, the leader of the Committee of Rural Workers, was killed in the attack. The EPP claimed responsibility for the incident.
- On 21 April, a roadside bomb detonated near a police patrol in Azotey, Concepción. One officer was killed and three were wounded in the attack. Armed assailants attacked a police station in Concepción department. One attacker was killed and two policemen were wounded in the ensuing gunfire. The attack was committed in response to the murder of a local peasant leader.
- On 30 May, the cattleman, logger, and former mayor of Tacuatí, Luis Alberto Lindstron, was assassinated.
- In June, a rancher was killed by EPP militants.
- In August, five people were killed by suspected EPP militants near San Pedro de Ycuamandiyú.
- On 15 August, Paraguay's new President Horacio Cartes announced an assault on the EPP, sending 400 troops to the north of the country.
- On 17 August, assailants abducted six people from the Lagunita cattle ranch in Tacuatí, San Pedro. The assailants killed five of the abductees, but one escaped or was released and reported the incident to the police. The attackers then ambushed the police when the officers responded, injuring one police officer. The EPP claimed responsibility for this incident.
- On 1 October, assailants detonated an IED and opened fire on a vehicle transporting human rights trainers near Tacuatí, San Pedro. At least one police officer was killed and seven other people were injured in the assault.
- On 10 October, assailants detonated explosive devices and opened fire on police vehicles in Horqueta, Concepción. Police Chief Manuel Escurra was killed, and two other police officers were injured in the attack. In another incident, militants attempted to kidnap a civilian rancher in Horqueta, Concepción. The outcome of the kidnapping attempt is unknown.
- On 8 December, EPP guerrillas killed a rancher and a Paraguayan Air Force sergeant in two separate attacks.

=== 2014 ===
- On 2 April, 2 EPP guerillas and a soldier were killed after an attack against a Brazilian-owned property in the Concepción department. One of the two EPP members was the group's reported third-in-command. The insurgents managed to kidnap the 16-year-old son of farmers during their escape.
- On 29 April, militants robbed a van carrying tactical police gear in Horqueta, Concepción. There were no reported casualties; however, the assailants stole cell phones, cash, and police gear.
- On 16 June, militants burned the Yaguarate Hu estate on fire in Tacuatí, Concepción. There were no reported casualties; however, the building was damaged in the attack.
- On 4–5 July, a police officer was kidnapped in the north of the country, a day after an electricity tower was bombed near Wye in the Concepción department. The attack disrupted the electricity supply to approximately 90,000 residents, most of them in Pedro Juan Caballero in the neighboring Amambay department. Damages were estimated at over $1 million in total.
- On 27 July, guerrillas opened fire on a police vehicle in Arroyito, Concepción. There were no reported casualties in the attack.
- On 6 August, guerrillas abducted two Japanese citizens in Chinguelo, Amambay. Both victims were released three hours later after paying a ransom of $50,000. The EPP claimed responsibility for the incident.
- On 3–5 September, guerrillas burned La Novia animal pen in Arroyito, Concepción. There were no reported casualties in the attack. Two days later, militants attacked another ranch in Arroyito, Concepción.
- On 8 September, a faction splintered from the EPP, forming the Armed Peasant Association (ACA), which also fights the government. Led by brothers Albino and Alfredo Jara Larrea, this splinter group was believed to number around 13 fighters by the time of its foundation.
- On 12 September, a Fuerzas de Tarea Conjunta (FTC) counter-insurgency team raided a house in Concepción department. Two suspected EPP members were killed in the raid.
- On 19 September, three ACA members were killed and two others injured in an engagement with FTC members.
- On 21 September, one ACA member was killed in a FTC raid.
- On 26 November, guerrillas detonated an explosive device at a military van in Cuero Fresco, Concepción. Two soldiers were killed and at least one other was injured in the blast. No group claimed responsibility for the incident.
- On 29 December, militants opened fire on a civilian vehicle in Yby Yaú, Concepción. One person was injured in the attack. No group claimed responsibility for the incident; however, sources attributed the attack to the EPP.
- On 30 December, the EPP freed Arlan Fick, who had been held hostage since his kidnapping in April. A ransom of $500,000 was paid to the insurgents, and $50,000 worth of food was also distributed to two communities as part of the deal.

=== 2015 ===
- On 5 January, Albino Jara Larrea (aka Commander Milciades Leon) - one of the leaders of the ACA - was killed in a shootout with security forces in Concepción department.
- On 25 January, EPP members attacked and burned parts of a farm in Azotey in the south of Concepción department. No one was injured in the attack, which was the second such incident at the same location in less than a month. In a handwritten note left on the premises, the guerrillas demanded that the farm's owner pay a $300,000 "fine" and distribute free beef to local communities as punishment for alleged deforestation before 6 February, insisting that "Nature is not ours; it's only borrowed from future generations".
- On 30 January, authorities discovered the bullet-riddled bodies of a German couple who had been kidnapped the previous day together with four local workers from a farm in Yby Yaú, Concepción, adjacent to the one attacked a few days earlier. Both German citizens had been living on the ranch for more than 30 years.
- On 24 March, police discovered the bodies of three farm workers on the Alegria ranch in Tacuatí. A note signed by the EPP left next to the corpses warned the farmers against using pesticides and owning weapons. A government prosecutor stated that the ranchers were killed despite complying with the demands.
- On 12 July, EPP militants attacked and killed two police officers. Another officer was killed in a separate attack three days later.
- On 17 July, EPP militants killed three police officers close to the location of the 12 July attack.
- In course of raids in November, Paraguayan security forces killed four ACA militants, including Alfredo Jara Larrea and two other commanders of the group.
- On 18 December, during an army operation, a civilian farmer was shot and killed near Kurusú de Hierro, Concepción, after soldiers allegedly mistook him for an EPP member. In January 2016, his widow filed for an official investigation of the incident, with the help of Paraguayan NGO SERPAJ PY.

=== 2016 ===
- On 17 May, the new leader of the ACA, Idilio Morínigo, was killed by security forces.
- On 18 May, one ACA fighter shot one of his comrades dead and fled with all of the 260-300 million guaraní.
- On 27 July, militants attacked a farm ~340 km north of the capital Asunción, burning a tractor and a truck and kidnapping Franz Wiebe Boschman, a Mennonite of German descent. The EPP later claimed responsibility for the attack and demanded a $700,000 ransom within 15 days in order to release the man. Wiebe Boschman was eventually released by the group on 25 February 2017.
- On 27 August, EPP militants ambushed a Paraguayan military mobile patrol, traveling on a dirt road, with a roadside bomb and FN FAL battle rifles. The incident took place near Arroyito village, west of Concepción. The assailants killed a total of eight soldiers, one of them an officer and the rest non-commissioned officers. The insurgents stole their M4 carbines equipped with scopes and grenade launchers, a light machine gun, and 1,500 rounds of ammunition. This was the deadliest EPP attack to date.
- By the end of 2016, the ACA had been largely destroyed by Paraguayan security forces, and all of its leaders had been killed.

=== 2017 ===
- On 10 January, suspected members of the EPP entered a house in San Pedro and attacked two Mennonite brothers in a possible failed kidnapping attempt, wounding one of them.
- On 6 April, EPP militants shot dead a security guard in a ranch in the Concepción department, in an assassination campaign aimed at private security guards in rural areas.
- On 27 April, another security guard was killed in a ranch in the Concepción department.
- On 24 July, Los Justicieros de la Frontera kill two brothers members of the EPP that kidnapped few days before.

=== 2018 ===
- On 12 January, Abraham Fehr, a Mennonite farmer kidnapped by the EPP in 2015, was found dead in the San Pedro department, in the north of Paraguay.
- On 31 January, an encounter between members of the Army of Marshal López (EML) and security forces was reported in Arroyito, Concepción. It is believed that some militants may have been wounded.
- On 5 February, the EPP released two Mennonite farmers who had been held hostage for more than five months by the guerrillas.
- On 7 April, a policeman and a soldier were wounded during an armed attack by EPP militants in Arroyito, Concepción. The attack took place days before the national elections.
- On 9–11 April, a series of gunfights between guerrillas and security forces was reported in the municipality of Arroyito, Concepción. On 12 April, the militants escaped, and the army captured a guerrilla camp. This operation was harshly criticized for the lack of results despite the great mobilization of the army and the FTC forces.
- On 5 May, a soldier belonging to the FTC committed suicide during a deployment against the EPP.
- On 18 July, a woman was shot dead and another civilian was injured in an attack in the municipality of Tacuara. The woman had been associated with the ACA.
- On 27 July, a gunfight between members of the EPP and the FTC erupted in Arroyito, Concepción. The authorities found an improvised camp, tactical gear, and traces of blood, and they suspected that some militants were injured in the attack.
- On 22 August, a gunfight between soldiers left two soldiers injured and one killed. It was later shown that the soldier who initiated the shooting was under the influence of alcohol.
- On 5 September, the leader of the EPP Alcides Osmar Oviedo Brítez began to stand trial for being the principal suspect of the kidnapping of Arlan Fick, who had occurred on 2 April 2014. Also, on 25 September, Zunilda Jara Larrea and Juan Morínigo, members of the defunct armed group ACA, began to stand trial, after the 27 August 2016 attack against the military in Arroyito, Concepción.
- On 19 November, members of the EPP kidnapped and then killed a Brazilian farmer in the San Pedro department.
- On 8 December, members of the EPP attacked a farm in San Vicente Pancholo near General Isidoro Resquín, San Pedro. The attackers burned three fumigation aircraft, one tractor, and one truck belonging to an agro-livestock local company, although no injuries were reported.

=== 2019 ===
- On 21 April, five armed militants from the reconstituted ACA, four men and a woman wearing camouflage fatigues, attacked a ranch in the Concepción department, setting a number of heavy vehicles on fire, among them two pickup trucks, a cart, a bulldozer, and a tractor. No casualties were reported.
- On 13 may, a gunfight between ACA and security forces in the area of Alemán Cue, Horqueta, resulted in the death of Zulma Jara Larrea, sister of Albino and Alfredo Jara Larrea.
- On 8 July, a group of 20 militants, of whom five were aboriginals, led by EPP leader Osvaldo Daniel Villalba Ayala, assaulted and torched the Ñandu’i ranch, in Amambay department. The Brazilian manager of the ranch was killed.

=== 2020 ===
- On 12 June, an ACA militant was killed in a gunfight with FTC counterinsurgency forces at Loreto.
- On 2 September, the Paraguayan Army launched an assault on a large EPP camp near Yby Yaú, 70 km northeast of Concepción, killing a number of militants, among them two female teenagers, both of them Argentine residents. A dozen EPP members fled to the jungle. The Paraguayan soldiers confiscated a number of weapons and equipment. A Paraguayan officer was wounded. It was later revealed that the two teenagers killed were actually 11-year-old cousins who had traveled from Argentina to Paraguay to spend time with their parents, who were members of the EPP.
- On 9 September, the Paraguayan government confirmed that former Vice President Óscar Denis and one of his employees were kidnapped by members of the EPP not far from the site of the guerrilla camp assaulted by the army the week before. The pickup vehicle operated by the two men was found abandoned with propaganda leaflets scattered around. Authorities believed that the kidnapping was a retaliatory strike from the EPP due to the deaths of the 11-year-old Argentine girls the week before.

=== 2021 ===
- On 2 April, the ACA killed a disabled man trying to kidnap him.
- On 12 June, the ACA killed a brazilian worker trying to kidnap him.
- In late June, four heavily armed members of the ACA kidnapped Jorge Ríos Barreto, the 24-year-old son of a farm owner in the Concepción department, leaving behind a $200,000 ransom note. On 3 July, Ríos' body was found on the bank of a nearby river with a bullet hole in his neck.
- On 29 July, EPP militants attacked an FTC convoy in the San Pedro department with a bomb, killing three soldiers.
- On 1 August, two militants of the EML were killed in a clash with the soldiers, one of them was Alejandro Ramos, the leader of the EML. The same day, Los Justicieros de la Frontera kill two young brothers, next to the bodies was a letter of threats to the EPP.
- On 3 August, the ACA attacked police in San Alfredo, killing two policemen and a private guard.
- On 2 October, one militant of the EPP was killed in a clash with the soldiers.
- On 19 November, four militants of the ACA were killed in a clash with the FTC.
- On 16 December, one militant of the ACA was killed in a clash with the FTC, also one soldier was injured.

=== 2022 ===
- On 5 March, three peoples were kidnapped by the EPP, one was released on 14 March, the other two were found dead on 2 April.
- On 27 April, in the northeast part the EPP attacked a military vehicle with an improvised explosive device wounding three soldiers.
- On 23 October, in a clash between militaries and the EPP, five people (two of them suspected EPP leaders, one was a militant of the guerrilla group and the other two were civilians) were killed and one, a civilian, injured.
- On 15 November, a militant of the ACA was killed by the brother of an EPP militant.
- On 21 November, the EPP attacked police 17km from the place of the 23 October operation in which one of the leaders, Osvaldo Villalba, was killed. Three police officers were injured in the attack.

=== 2023 ===
- On 9 October, a woman civilian was shot 40 times and killed by EPP militants in Bella Vista Norte.
- On 17 October, human bones have been found in Bella Vista Norte in an area of EPP influence.

=== 2025 ===
- On 12 March, an indigenous leader died from wounds and torture sustained in an EPP attack in October 2022.
- On 14 July, in a clash between security forces and EPP, an EPP militant was killed and a soldier injured in Mbaracayú.

=== 2026 ===
- On 21 July, a commando composed of 20-30 men with camouflages and masks attacked a police station in Naranjito, Canindeyú, killing two policemen and a civilian and wounding a police major. Although the lack of claims, tests on the shell casings later confirmed the link to the EPP alongside narcos.

== Casualties ==
Year	Deaths	Injuries
2005	2	0
2008	0	2
2009	0	2
2010	11	0
2011	6	5
2012	18	81+
2013	20	16
2014	11	7
2015	18	0
2016	10	0
2017	4	1
2018	5	+3
2019	12+	0
2020	18	1
2021	19	1
2022	9	7
2023	1	0
2025	2	1
2026	3	1
Total	+169	+128

From 2008 until the summer of 2014, the EPP campaign resulted in around 50 deaths in total, the majority of them being local ranchers, private security guards and police officers, along with several insurgents. During that same period the group perpetrated 28 kidnappings for ransom and a total of 85 "violent acts". In 2015, the conflict escalated to become the deadliest year of the conflict, with 18 fatalities reported. 10 were reported in 2016 and 4 in 2017.
