= Armed Peasant Association =

Leftist Paraguayan insurgent group

- Agrupación Campesina Armada
- The Armed Peasant Association used several varieties of this flag, usually with different logos in the centre.
- Leaders: Albino Jara Larrea (alias "Milciades León") †; Alfredo Jara Larrea (alias "José Villaverde") †; Idilio Morínigo †; Feliciano Bernal Maíz †; Hugo Bernal Maíz †
- Dates active: 2014–2016; 2017–c. 2024
- Split from: Paraguayan People's Army (EPP)
- Country: Paraguay
- Active regions: Concepción Department, Amambay Department
- Political position: Far-left
- Size: ~13 (in 2014); ~4 (in late 2016)

The Armed Peasant Association (Spanish: Agrupación Campesina Armada, short ACA), alternatively known as Armed Campesino Group (Note: A "Campesino" is a tenant farmer or farm worker in Latin America) and Armed Peasant Grouping – People's Army (ACA–EP), was a far-left rebel group that took part in the insurgency in Paraguay. Formed in 2014 as splinter faction of the Paraguayan People's Army (EPP) by two brothers, Albino and Alfredo Jara Larrea, ACA began to decline almost immediately after its foundation as result of repeated raids and arrests by the Paraguayan security forces. After the death of most of its members and leaders in 2016, the group became defunct. It was refounded in 2017, however, by two sisters of the Jara Larrea brothers and a former member of the "Army of Marshal López" (EML), another insurgent group. This revived group again suffered a heavy defeat and was nearly destroyed in late 2021, and was believed to be defunct by mid-2024.

== History ==
=== Foundation and operations under the Jara Larrea brothers ===
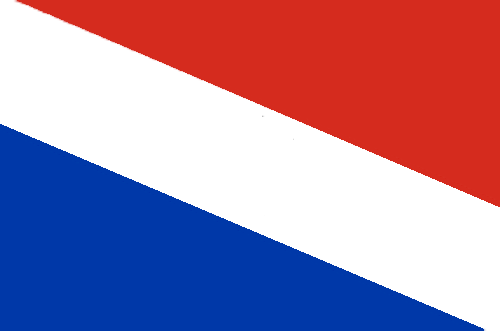
One of the alternate flags used by the group.

The formation of ACA was the result of dissent among the EPP. One of the rebel group's columns which was led by the Jara Larrea brothers had long harbored resentment for the EPP central leadership, allegedly because the brothers had been berated for their indiscipline, including drunkenness, partying, looting and womanizing. After the Larrea faction received a ransom of over one million Paraguayan guaraní (over $230,000) in June 2014 for a kidnapped businessman from Yby Yau, the group had enough funds to become independent. In September 2014, the Larrea brothers and their followers fully broke away from the EPP and formed the Armed Peasant Association; the group was initially believed to have around 13 members.

According to the government, ACA modeled itself on the Colombian FARC and wanted to become involved in the illegal drug trade in Paraguay through taxation or extortion of marijuana farmers; an expert from InSight Crime considered this assumption likely, as one ACA member, Rubén Darío López Fernández, was known to have close links with the First Catarinense Group, a Brazilian crime group.

Soon after ACA's foundation, however, the group was targeted by the Paraguayan security forces in course of several raids between 19 and 21 September, with around five ACA fighters killed. Having thus lost about a third of its strength, including the "key fighter" Marcos Ojeda, ACA was already seriously weakened just after its conception. This quick weakening suggested that ACA lacked "the level of professionalism" and civilian support that EPP enjoyed. ACA's decline continued afterwards, and already on 5 January 2015 the Joint Task Force managed to corner the group east of Concepción. In course of the following shootout Albino Jara Larrea was killed and several other militants injured, further reducing ACA's fighting strength. In an attempt to replenish its numbers, ACA recruited child soldiers; there were also accounts that some female child soldiers married older ACA fighters.

After Albino's death, his brother Alfredo became the group's new leader. Under his command, ACA apparently began to work closely with the EPP, leading experts to consider the possibility that ACA, weakened by their many losses, might fully rejoin the EPP. In the end, however, ACA remained officially independent. Eventually, the group managed to kidnap police sergeant Idilio Morínigo and Mennonite settler Abraham Fehr in order to hold them for ransom, but its demise continued. On 9 September, security forces captured the faction's alleged logistics chief, Daniel Rivarola Areco, and in November 2015 the Joint Task Force launched a devastating raid against ACA's headquarters at the border of the Concepción and Amambay Departments. In course of this operation, which was later characterized by Interior Minister Francisco de Vargas as "the most successful" yet during the Paraguayan counter-insurgency campaign, most of ACA's leadership was killed: Namely Alfredo Jara Larrea, second-in-command Mariano López Velázquez (alias "Fredi Romero"), and third-in-command Ovelar González (alias "Beto Gimenez").

=== Decline and revival ===
At this point, ACA had already mostly ceased to exist, but remnants of the group remained active and joined forces with the "Army of Marshal López" (EML), another EPP splinter group. On 17 May 2016, the new ACA commander, Idilio Morínigo, was killed by government forces; this caused a dispute among his surviving followers, who could not agree how to share the 260-300 million guaraní that Morínigo had in his possession when he died. As result, one ACA fighter shot one of his comrades dead and fled with all of the money.

In December 2016, four ACA militants stormed the Silva Smith hacienda in the Concepción Department, and took the family and its employees hostage, demanding 300 million guaraní for their release. Eventually, however, the ACA fighters became nervous about a possible attack by the Joint Task Force, freed the hostages and left without further violence. In March 2017, Paraguayan security forces arrested several men and women, including relatives of the deceased Jara Larrea brothers, who were suspected to be connected to the ACA or EPP. In late May, government forces arrested a man who was believed to be one of the hostage takers of the previous December.

On 22 July 2017, two cousins of Albino and Alfredo Jara Larrea, namely Rodrigo and J. Argüello Larrea, disappeared in the Concepción Department. As the police investigated the area where they had last been seen, they found traces of a militant camp, suggesting that the two had been abducted. Just a few days before this incident, the vigilante self-defense group "Justicieros de la Frontera" had kidnapped the sister-in-law of Alejandro Ramos, another Leftist rebel leader. Sometime before October 2017, the Armed Peasant Association was refounded by Feliciano Bernal Maíz, a Leftist militant who had been expelled by EML, and two sisters of Albino and Alfredo Jara Larrea, namely Zulma and Emiliana Jara Larrea. The first known action of the new Armed Peasant Association was a raid on the "La Novia" ranch on 10 October 2017. The group's members, of unknown number, operate as part-time insurgents, stealing and extorting farms during periodic raids and then returning to civilian life.

On 21 April 2019, gunmen attacked a farm, destroying much equipment. On 8 May, the Armed Peasant Association claimed responsibility for the attack and threatened more attacks in the future in a video. Days later, a gunfight between ACA and security forces in the area of Alemán Cue, Horqueta, resulted in the death of Zulma Jara Larrea, sister of Albino and Alfredo Jara Larrea. By 2021, ACA consisted of at least four members who were heavily armed and was led by the brothers Feliciano and Hugo Bernal Maíz. In that year, ACA was responsible for a series of at least eight kidnappings for ransom in Concepción Department. In three cases, the kidnappings ended with murder, such as in the case of Jorge Ríos Barreto, the son of a farm owner, who was shot by ACA militants after they had demanded $200,000 to return him alive to his family. In early August 2021, suspected ACA militants attacked a police station at San Alfredo, injuring one person.

=== Demise of the refounded group ===
In November 2021, ACA reportedly suffered heavy losses in a clash, with four of its members being killed. Its leaders, Feliciano and Hugo Bernal Maíz, were reportedly among the dead. Security forces initially claimed credit and declared the group destroyed, but journalists later revealed that drug smugglers had actually been responsible for ACA's defeat. On 16 December, police raided two locations in Puentesiño, Sargento José Félix López, arresting three individuals and killing one after a shootout. Weaponry found at the locations were later identified as having previously been used by ACA militants.

In November 2022, an alleged ACA member, Darío Mancuello, was murdered by the brother of an EPP member in Kurusu de Hierro, Concepción. Based on witness reports, police judged the incident to have resulted from a drunken dispute which had gone out of control. By 2023, security forces assumed that ACA still existed, though it had been greatly weakened due the loss of its commanders over the previous years.

By mid-2024, ACA was described as defunct by the newspaper Última Hora. However, a criminal named Sergio Cañiza Benítez initially claimed to have become the group's new leader. He used his alleged position to extort Mennonite settlers in Doctor Juan Eulogio Estigarribia District, Caaguazú Department, before being arrested and revealed to be a fraud in January 2025. In September 2025, three men were sentenced by a Paraguayan court to prison terms ranging from 16 to 18 years for providing logistical support to ACA.

== Ideology ==
ACA was described as Marxist–Leninist by the newspaper amambay ahora, but political analyst Horacio Galeano Perrone pointed out that the group lacked the ideological foundation of the EPP, and was instead mainly focused on "principios de combate" (combat principles). In 2021, Vice journalist Amy Booth also stated that "it's unclear to what extent the EPP's original Marxist ideology has survived in splinter groups such as ACA-EP."
