= Paraguayan Air Force =

Air warfare branch of Paraguay's armed forces

- Fuerza Aérea Paraguaya
- Emblem of the Paraguayan Air Force
- Founded: 1946
- Country: Paraguay
- Type: Air force
- Role: Aerial warfare
- Size: 1,100 personnel (2012); 38 aircraft (2023)
- Part of: Armed Forces of Paraguay
- Headquarters: Asunción
- Patron: Our Lady of Loreto
- Mottos: Spanish: Vencer o Morir "Win or Die"
- March: Canción de la Fuerza Aérea
- Anniversaries: December 10 (day of Our Lady of Loreto)
- Engagements: Paraguayan Civil War (1922-1923); Chaco War; Paraguayan Civil War (1947); 1989 Paraguayan coup d'état Insurgency in Paraguay
- Decorations: Chaco Cross, Defender's Cross, Boquerón Medal

Commanders
- Interim Commander of the Air Force: Air Division General Julio Rubén Fullaondo Céspedes
- Chief of the Air Force General Staff: Air Division General Rubén Darío Piris Fernández

Insignia
- Roundel

- Fin flash

- Flag

Aircraft flown
- Attack: Embraer EMB 312 Tucano, Embraer EMB 314 Super Tucano
- Helicopter: Bell 407, Bell 427
- Attack helicopter: Airbus H25
- Utility helicopter: Airbus H25, Bell UH-1 Huey
- Reconnaissance: Diamond DA62
- Trainer: ENAER T-35 Pillán
- Transport: Cessna Citation Sovereign, Beechcraft Super King Air, CASA C-212, Cessna 208 Caravan, De Havilland DHC-6

The Paraguayan Air Force (Spanish: Fuerza Aérea Paraguaya) is a branch of the Armed Forces of Paraguay, in charge of the defense of Paraguay's skies. Its commander is Air Division General Julio Rubén Fullaondo Céspedes. Its headquarters are located in Ñu Guazu, Luque, a city which belongs to Gran Asunción.

== History ==
While the formal beginning of Paraguayan military aviation is often traced to the end of the 1920s, when the First Fighter Squadron and the First Reconnaissance Squadron were formed with French Wilbaut 72s and Potez 25 A.2s respectively, the airplane had already been used in combat in limited numbers in the 1922 Civil War, mostly flown by foreign pilots.

The Paraguayan Air Force (then called the Military Aviation) played an important part in the Paraguayan victory in the Chaco War, being present from the first to the last actions of the conflict. In 1932, the Second Reconnaissance and Bombing Squadron, with Potez 25 aircraft, and in 1933, the Eleventh Fighter Squadron «Los Indios», with Fiat CR.20bis, were formed.

After the war, until the end of the 1930s, the government acquired a series of new planes to reequip the Paraguayan Air Force, including five Fiat CR.32 fighters and seven Caproni AP.1 light attack aircraft, which were used to equip the two fighter squadrons. In 1945, some planes were also donated by the United States as the Second World War wound down.

In the following decades, the Air Force had practically no combat-ready planes, though it had many foreign-trained pilots. It was only in the 1970s that the Air Force received a dozen outdated but still armed T-6 Texan planes and started again training pilots in its own soil. By the end of the 1970s though most of the aircraft inventory was still World War II vintage. The government decided to buy ten AT-26 Xavante from Brazil in order to be able to defend the Paraguayan airspace; the first three aircraft arrived in December 1979 at the International Airport of Asunción.

When, in 1989, a coup was started against long-standing dictator Alfredo Stroessner, fighter pilots 1st Lts. Juan Antonio Rojas Duré and Gerardo Miguel Ángel Maldonado Gómez, piloting Xavantes, made a series of aggressive flyovers above the loyalist forces, a deeply demoralizing action, for the latter had no way to defend themselves against the combat jets. The action of the Air Force, together with coup leader General Andrés Rodríguez's artillery superiority, led to a hasty surrender by Stroessner's forces.

In 1990 the Taiwanese government donated six T-33 Shooting Star jets to the Air Force, of which the first few arrived in 1991. The Taiwanese had also announced they would donate twelve F-5E/F fighter jets to Paraguay, with provisions for supplies, maintenance and the training of ground crew and pilots, but the transaction did not go through due to international issues.

The AT-26 Xavante were deactivated permanently in 2004, after twenty five years of service in the Air Force.

From circa 2014/2015 onwards, plans were started to modernize the branch, through bidding processes, law projects in the Congress and contracts with multinational corporations. A few achievements were noted in specialized news sources:

- The acquisition and unveiling of ELTA EL/M 2106 NG radar sets.

- The start of the acquisition process for a parachuting simulator, and for drone interception equipment.

- The acquisition of different flight simulators.

- The creation of a federal program for the research and development of UAVs.

Besides this, studies have been made for the acquisition of Embraer EMB 314 Super Tucano planes, and also a delegation sent to the scene of the negotiations between Peru and South Korea for the KT-1P. In 2019, a delegation was sent to Argentina to discuss the purchase of helicopters and the IA-63 Pampa. In the same year, a Paraguayan company started to produce under license the Brazilian RQ-17 ION UAV.

In April 2021, the PAF did flight-tests of the Wega 180, and in November, of the first prototypes of Paraguayan-made UAVs.

In December 2022, a delegation from the PAF evaluated the RPA-240 radar, which it planned to use against the Narcotráfico. In the same year, its T-35 Pillán were sent back to ENAER for an overhaul.

In April 2023, the PAF C-in-C signed a declaration of interest with the Fabrica Argentina de Aviones for the acquisition of the IA-100 trainer. In December 2023, Arturo Javier González Ocampo, who had been the PAF's Commander in Chief until November, was arrested by the Federal Police of Brazil amidst an investigation on arms trafficking.

Overall, as it stands, due to many budgetary and political issues, the PAF's equipment can be considered mostly obsolete.

=== Peacekeeping ===
The Paraguayan Air Force participates and has participated in various humanitarian missions headed by the UN, namely:

- Haiti (MINUSTAH)
- Cyprus (UNFICYP)
- Democratic Republic of the Congo (MONUC)
- Chad and the Central African Republic (MINURCAT)
- Ivory Coast (ONUCI)
- Sudan (UNMIS)
- Liberia (UNMIL)
- Republic of the Congo (MONUSCO)

== Structure ==
The Air Force is composed of the Aerial Tactical Group (GAT) with three fighter squadrons, the Aerial Transport Group (GTA) which includes a paratrooper brigade, the Aerial Helicopter Group (GAH) and its SAR squadron, a utility squadron, a ground attack squadron, the Aerial Instruction Group (GAI), the Aerial Photogrammetric Group (GAF) and the Aerial Maintenance Group Sector (SEMAER). The last three units have no aircraft assigned to them.

Besides these, there exist the Instruction Institutes Command and the Aerial Regions Command; the latter has nominal jurisdiction over twelve landing strips and airports, six of which are air bases.

=== First Aerial Brigade ===
- Aerial Tactical Group
  - 1.º Fighter Squadron «Guaraní» (Escadrilles «Orion» y «Centauro»), Deactivated Aermacchi MB-326
  - 2.º Fighter Squadron «Indios» (Escadrilles «Taurus» y «Scorpio»), Active EMB-314 Super Tucano
  - 3.º Fighter Squadron «Moros» (Escadrilles «Gamma» y «Omega»): Active EMB-312 Tucano
- Aerial Instruction Group «Fénix Squadron»: T-25A
  - «Antares» / «Pantera» / «Halcón» Squadrons: T-35A/B
- Aerial Transport Group:
  - Aerial Transport Escadrille: C-212 (Asunción/Ñu Guasú air base)
  - Presidential Escadrille: DHC-6
- Aerial Helicopter Group: UH-1H, HB-350
- Special Aerial Transport Group: C-208, CE u206, Ce 210N, Ce 402B, PA 32R, PZL 104
- Aerial Photogrammetric Group

=== Airmobile Brigade ===
- Paratrooper Battalion
- Support and Services Battalion
- Paratrooper Squadron
- Airmobile Infantry Battalion
- Security Battalion

=== Aerial Regions Command ===
- Western Regional Command
- Eastern Regional Command
- Environmental Directory
- PAF Environmental Fire Marshal Corps
- Communications and Meteorology Directory
- Forestry and Agriculture Directorate
- Workshops and Transportation Directory
- Infrastructure and Engineering Group

=== Logistics Brigade ===
- Quartermaster Directory
- Land Transport Directory
- Weaponry Directory
- Health Services Directory
- Aerial Supply Group
- Aerial Maintenance Group
- PAF Mobilization and Recruitment Directory

=== Instruction Institutes Command ===
- Air Force Command and General Staff School
- Air Force Officer Improvement School
- Air Force Non-Commissioned Officer Formation School
- Specialized Instruction Center
- Air Force Language Studies Center
- Reserve Officers Formation Center

=== Air bases ===
The Paraguayan Air Force operates from around 7 air bases, together with 4 civilian international airports and 3 civilian national airports:

Paraguayan Air Force Installations
Name	Location	Notes/Mission
Ñu Guasu Air Base	Luque, Gran Asunción	Headquarters station, merged with the International Airport of Asunción. Also home to the Air Force Museum.
Silvio Pettirossi International Airport	Luque, Gran Asunción	Civilian international airport.
General Adrián Jara Air Base	Alto Paraguay	
Nueva Asunción Air Base	Boquerón Department	
Mayor Infante Rivarola Air Base	Boquerón Department	Built around landing strip used by military and civilian aircraft.
Teniente Pratts Gill Air Base	Boquerón Department	
Luis María Argaña Air Base	Mariscal Estigarribia, Boquerón Department	Base connected to the Dr. Luis María Argaña International Airport, used by civilians and the military. Has a radar array.
Mariscal Francisco Solano López Air Base	Concepción, Concepción Department	Connected to the Teniente Coronel Carmelo Peralta Airport.
Doctor Augusto Roberto Fuster Air Base	Pedro Juan Caballero, Amambay	Connected to the Dr. Augusto Roberto Fuster Airport.
Guaraní Air Base	Minga Guazú, Alto Paraná	Connected to the Guaraní International Airport.
Aviadores del Chaco Air Base	Itapúa Department	
Amín Ayub González Air Base	Encarnación, Itapúa Department	Connected to the Teniente Amin Ayub Gonzalez Airport.
Yacyretá Air Base	Yacyretá Island, Misiones Department	Located close to the Yacyretá Dam.
Ayolas Air Base	Ayolas, Misiones Department	Located close to the Yacyretá Dam.
Cerro Cora National Park Military Airport	Amambay Department	

== Equipment ==
=== Aircraft ===
==== Current inventory ====
Aircraft	Image	Type	Origin	Variant	In service	Notes
Combat aircraft / Close air support
EMB 314 Super Tucano		Light attack / Trainer	Brazil	AT-29	6	Recently acquired, as of 2025
EMB 312 Tucano		Light attack / Trainer	Brazil	AT-27	6	Modernized by Embraer in 2024
Reconnaissance
Diamond DA62MMP		Surveillance	Austria	D62	1	SAR
Transport aircraft
Citation Jet Sovereign		VIP	United States	C680	1	Government transport
Beechcraft Super King Air		VIP / Transport	United States	B350 / C90	2	Military transport / Surveillance
Airbus Defense CASA C-212		Transport / Airlift medevac	Spain	212-200 212-400	3	Paratrooper transport
De Havilland DHC-6 Twin Otter		STOL Multi role	Canada	DHC6	1	Multi-role
Cessna 208 Grand Caravan		Transport / Medevac	United States	C208	5	Multi-role
Trainer aircraft
Enaer T-35 Pillan		Basic trainer	Chile	T-35	12	Modernized in 2023
Beechcraft Baron B58		Trainer / Utility	United States	B58	2	Trainer
UAV - Unmanned aerial vehicle
Aerovehicles PY		Surveillance / attack	Paraguay	Mbopy	1-3	Made in Paraguay
Helicopters
Bell UH-1 Huey		Utility	United States	UH-1H	12	Multi-role
Airbus Helicopter H125		Attack / Utility	France	AS350	4	Light attack
Bell 427		VIP / Medevac	United States	B427	1	Government transport
Bell 407 Gxi		VIP / Medevac	United States	B407	1	Government transport

==== Retired ====
Boeing 707	Aermachhi MB-326	PBY Catalina

=== Armament ===
The EMB 314 Super Tucano and Embraer EMB 312 Tucano fighters can carry Mk 81 and Mk 82 bombs, 70mm aerial rockets and .50 machine guns. The H125/AS350 helicopter can also carry 70 mm aerial rockets, and pods with .50 machine guns or cannons.

=== Radar ===
Paraguay employs approximately 3 Israeli made EL/M 2106 NG radars which provide a 3D picture of the controlled airspace. The country also will have Advanced Air Surveillance Radars that will be installed by Northrop Grumman.

== See also ==
- Armed Forces of Paraguay
- List of retired Paraguayan military aircraft
