= Paraguayan People's Army =

Paraguayan communist guerrilla movement operating since 2008

- Ejército del Pueblo Paraguayo
- EPP's badge
- Leaders: Osvaldo Villalba †; Manuel Cristaldo Mieres; Magna Meza; Carmen Villalba (POW); Osmar Martínez †
- Dates active: 1 March 2008 – present
- Headquarters: Horqueta
- Active regions: Paraguay
- Ideology: Communism; Marxism-Leninism; Guevarism; Foco theory; Left-wing nationalism; Revolutionary socialism
- Political position: Far-left
- Status: Active
- Size: Unknown
- Wars: Insurgency in Paraguay

The Paraguayan People's Army (Spanish: Ejército del Pueblo Paraguayo, EPP) is a Marxist–Leninist guerrilla group that officially operates in Paraguay since March 1, 2008, although its antecedents go back as far as the 1990s, acting at that time as the "clandestine armed wing" of Patria Libre (a communist party founded in 1990).

They operate in a similar way to other insurgent Latin American left-wing paramilitary guerrillas in times of dictatorships. These methods include "expropriating goods" and kidnapping businessmen, bankers, and ranchers in the area in which the EPP operates. Moreover, they have staged a number of armed operations including bombings, arson attacks, and shootings as part of an organized insurgency. They operate in northeastern Paraguay, with most incidents occurring in Concepción Department, as well as the neighboring departments of Canindeyú and San Pedro. According to the Paraguayan government, in its beginnings, the EPP's first leaders and members were trained by members of other regional guerrilla groups, such as the FARC of Colombia, or the Manuel Rodríguez Patriotic Front of Chile, among others.

As of March 2012, the group was suspected of carrying out 27 separate operations, with more than half of them occurring after January 2011. These incidents resulted in the deaths of at least 16 people — 9 civilians and 7 police officers. By December 2013, the insurgency resulted in killing of at least 33 civilians and police officers, with an unknown number of killed EPP operatives. By mid 2020, fatalities from the insurgency had surpassed 70, most of them civilians and police.

According to investigations by the Joint Task Forces (a special counterinsurgency unit made up of police, military and other state agents created in 2013), the EPP has millions of dollars collected in kidnappings, extortion, and what they term"expropriations." Contributions are also received from neighbors and supporters. To this day, they continue to gain followers in the area. There is a void left by the Paraguayan State.

== Ideology ==
According to Carmen Villalba, a member of the organization, who is currently in prison for the kidnapping of María Edith Bordón de Debernardi, the EPP is a "revolutionary and political military organization." Carmen Villalba, in January 2012, had admitted in an interview conceived by Mina Feliciángeli (Radio 1000 journalist) the following: "The EPP is a detachment from Patria Libre. We started there and formed the armed wing. We were always from Patria Libre, even though we were publicly denied by the party leaders."

The EPP was critical of previous governments, such as those of Fernando Lugo and Nicanor Duarte Frutos, since according to them, it represented the oligarchy, ignored social problems and did not propose a true agrarian reform. Since Nicanor Duarte Frutos came to power, the EPP has spoken up to the present day.

The Paraguayan People's Army defines itself as Marxist–Leninist and claims to be inspired by José Gaspar Rodríguez de Francia, the architect of Paraguay's independence and considered by the insurgents as a revolutionary. It rejects Paraguay's model of economic development, which is based on large farms owned by powerful landowners, most of whom grow transgenic soya. According to Galeano Perrone, a political analyst and former minister, the guerrillas "enjoy a certain popularity in poor regions abandoned by the state, and EPP members are often seen as Robin Hoods, redistributing wealth."'

The guerrilla group finances itself mainly by collecting "revolutionary taxes" from landowners and kidnapping for ransom prominent people. The authorities have accused it of involvement in drug trafficking, but this has been disputed by independent studies.'

According to an official of the diocese of Concepción, the Paraguayan authorities use the pretext of EPP "terrorism" to criminalise all economic and social demands of the peasants. Peasant trade unionists are murdered by the army and portrayed as guerrillas, while families are forced to leave because of military activities and hand over their land to large landowners or Brazilian companies. According to priest Benjamin Valiente, who is close to the peasant union movement, "the problem is that the EPP has the same demands as the peasant groups. Against deforestation, against fumigation and hostile to the big landowners, the armed organisation claims in its communiqués to be fighting for the people and against the oligarchs. But their actions harm us every time. They justify the security discourse and the militarisation of the region.'

The EPP is accused by the Paraguayan judiciary of having links with the FARC, which is said to have trained some of the EPP members in guerrilla techniques. The Colombian guerrilla group denies these allegations, explaining that it has no contact with the EPP, but praises its fight for the rights of the most disadvantaged. EPP is also said to have had relations with the Manuel Rodríguez Patriotic Front, a Chilean armed group, when it was active.

== Background (1992-2007) ==
=== Beginnings ===
In 1992 the Metropolitan Seminary of Asunción took the drastic decision to expel 8 seminarians, some of them were Alcides Oviedo, Gilberto Setrini, Osvaldo Martínez and Pedro Maciel, for the reason of taking to the extreme a Catholic ideology known as the "Theology of the Liberation" and participate in political activities other than the Church.

On the other hand, Juan Arrom, a well-known young university leader and opponent of the Stroessner dictatorship, led the then "Movimiento Patria Libre", a far-left political movement that had emerged shortly after the fall of Alfredo Stroessner, in 1990.

Arrom contacted Alcides Oviedo Britez (who had already known each other since 1990 for having taken a theology course together at the Catholic University of Asunción) and the other expelled seminarians, to invite them to be part of his political Movement, led by Arrom and Marti advertisement.

At first, this movement had thought to gain followers and thus come to power through elections. They went through the interior, and in poor communities to hold meetings, looking for sympathizers and recruiting people for it. But after the failed general elections of 1993, they showed that from a radical left-wing party and without infrastructure, it would be impossible to come to power. The strategy chosen after the elections was to continue with the political party (with Arrom at the head), and at the same time create an armed wing (with Oviedo at the head). The purpose of this was to install the idea of revolution as an alternative for the people and focus on criminal actions to get money and provide the movement with infrastructure. To strengthen the "armed wing" of the movement, between 1995 and 1996 Alcides Oviedo (head of the armed wing), and Carmen Villalba (Alcides' partner) contacted the Chilean guerrilla group Manuel Rodríguez Patriotic Front, and made numerous trips to Chile, to complete his military training in urban guerrilla and others.

=== Choré gang (1997) ===
In late 1997, authorities uncovered an attempted bank robbery in the town of Choré, San Pedro, located approximately 230 km (142.92 mi) north of Asunción. According to investigators, the operation was allegedly intended to raise funds to support the logistical structure of a political movement in the lead-up to the 1998 general elections. Members of the group—subsequently referred to in the media as the "Choré gang"—had rented a house near a local branch of the Banco Nacional de Fomento. From that property, they excavated an underground tunnel designed to reach the bank's vault. The plan was discovered on 15 December 1997 during a police raid.

Police became aware of the operation after neighbors reported suspicious activity at the residence, including a vehicle that periodically departed loaded and returned empty. Officers initiated an investigation and, while pursuing the suspected vehicle, intercepted several bags containing soil later identified as material extracted from the tunnel under construction.

Carmen María Villalba Ayala, Alcides Omar Oviedo Brítez, Gustavo Lezcano, Lucio Silva, and Pedro Maciel Cardozo were arrested. Gilberto Chamil Setrini had previously been detained on the outskirts of the town while transporting bags of soil removed from the tunnel. During the raid, authorities seized large-caliber firearms, ammunition, and wigs from the rented house. They also discovered the partially completed tunnel, which measured approximately 60 m (196.85 ft) in length and 1.75 m (5.74 ft) in diameter. The suspects were subsequently sentenced to three years' imprisonment.

=== Kidnapping of María Edith Bordón de Debernardi (2001) ===
On 16 November 2001, María Edith Bordón de Debernardi, also known as "Nika", was abducted in the morning hours. She was a member of a prominent family and the daughter-in-law of Enzo Debernardi, one of the "barons of Itaipú" during the dictatorship of Alfredo Stroessner. The kidnapping is widely regarded as the beginning of a series of high-profile abductions attributed to the group later known as EPP, which at the time operated under the name Patria Libre. Bordón de Debernardi remained in captivity for 64 days and was released in the early hours of 19 January 2002. According to official sources, a ransom of approximately US$1,000,000 was paid; other reports have suggested that the amount may have been higher.

Several of the kidnappers were part of the "Choré gang", and in turn sympathizers of the then Free Homeland Movement (later Free Homeland Party). For example, after a ransom payment agreed between kidnappers and family members of Bordón, three unknown young men collected the money and left in a vehicle with license plate 198174 from the municipality of Asunción., badge issued in the name of Gilberto Setrini, one of the members of the Choré gang captured in 1997. Likewise, part of the ransom money delivered to the authorities by Marcos Álvarez (given to him by Juan Arrom to "keep it for him"), it turned out, under expert opinion, to be money from the rescue. Advertisement Martí and Alcides Oviedo were recognized by the hostage as the "guards" during their kidnapping; Juan Arrom as the leader, Carmen Villalba as one of the cooks, among other people. It was not until June 2005 that the authorities discovered the house in which he was held in captivity, in the Palomar neighborhood of Asunción.

The then Chief of Investigation and Crimes of the National Police, Crio. Roberto González, would make a revelation that would turn what until then was an extraordinary police case, into a political scandal: “It was a successful outcome of a plan by a left - wing group (in reference to Patria Libre), with the intention of promoting the destabilization of the Government”. The Paraguayan population did not take these statements well, since they sounded like a return to the Stroessner era persecution of the left. After this, the arrest warrants were already circulating in the media for Arrom and Martí (leaders of Patria Libre) and for the participants of the "Choré gang" involved in the kidnapping.

A few days after their release, the relatives of Arrom and Martí denounced that they were missing, and they were found on January 30, 2002 (almost two weeks later) in a house in Villa Elisa, with traces of torture. They reported being kidnapped and tortured by a group of the police, demanding "the ransom money" and indicting them as the perpetrators of the crime. This incident became a national scandal that, due to the failure of public order, forced the resignation of the Minister of the Interior, the Minister of Justice and the Chief of Police. According to Arrom and Martí's version, they were kidnapped on January 17, 2002 in front of the then headquarters of the Center for Judicial Investigation (CIJ).

At that time, the Paraguayan Prosecutor's Office was investigating two processes, in which both Arrom and Martí were the defendants in one case (for the kidnapping of María Edith Bordón), as well as victims in another case (forced disappearance and torture allegedly committed by agents of the Condition). A year later, in the first case the defendants are accused by the prosecution and the case is elevated to oral and public trial; though the second case was extinguished because all the accused were conspicuously dismissed. In August 2003, days before the oral and public trial that Arrom and Martí would face for the kidnapping of María Edith, they fled the country (together with Víctor Colmán), being accepted in Brazil with the status of political refugees by CONARE towards the end in 2003. Shortly after these family sued the Paraguayan State before the Inter-American Court of Human Rights for crimes against humanity committed allegedly by agents of the State in early 2002.

=== Raid on Sanguina Kue (2003) ===
On 16 July 2003, a police operation was carried out at a residence in the Sanguina Kue settlement, located in Lima, San Pedro, as part of the search for fugitive Alcides Oviedo. During the raid, prosecutors Arnaldo Giuzzio and Antonio Ramón Bernal Casco, accompanied by police officers, were fired upon by four individuals allegedly linked to the kidnapping of María Edith Bordón de Debernardi.

The exchange of gunfire resulted in the death of Germán Aguayo, described as a rural supporter of the group, and injuries to one of the prosecutors. Carmen Villalba was arrested at the scene, while the remaining suspects escaped. Authorities reported the seizure of high-caliber weapons—including FAL rifles, grenades, a grenade launcher, and ammunition—as well as computers, mobile phones, and documents referring to operational procedures and potential kidnapping targets.

=== Kidnapping of Cecilia Cubas (2004) ===
With Arrom and Martí already accepted as political refugees in Brazil at the end of 2003, there was a change of command in the armed wing of the now Free Patria Party, with Osmar Martínez at the head, who prioritized the armed struggle over the institutional path defended by Arrom. Thus producing in the course of 2004, an internal conflict in the Free Homeland Party, where they end up dividing into two: a group under the command of Arrom, and the other group under the command of Martínez, the latter prevailing.

On September 21, 2004, Cecilia Cubas, daughter of the former President of the Republic Raúl Cubas Grau, was kidnapped.(1998-1999), in the late afternoon near her residence, in which she was intercepted between two vehicles with bullets. From the first night of the kidnapping until the first weeks of November, Cecilia's relatives and close friends received several phone calls, some of those calls with directions to look for "proof of life", from unusual places such as inside a bathroom cistern, in a shopping center in the capital, under public monuments in parks, squares, etc. These proofs of life were photographs of Cecilia holding newspaper covers (to locate the date), letters made by hand by Cecilia, among others.

Negotiations were carried out by e-mail between the relatives of Cubas and the kidnappers. During the negotiations, they referred to Cecilia as a fruit. In one of their e-mails they said that "I don't think the fruit can last longer, remember that it is already rotting." In November 2004, on a neighborhood road - rural area of Caaguazú - USD 300,000 was paid for the ransom, although later the kidnappers considered this only as a "fine" for late payment and for the treatment of relatives towards the kidnappers, and therefore Cecilia was never released.

Five months after kidnapped the 16 of February 2005, Cecilia Cubas was found dead buried underground in a topiary of a house located in Ñemby tunnel. She had already been dead for around 30 to 60 days when she was found according to forensic analysis. Some of the captors (then members of the armed wing of the Partido Patria Libre) were reportedly advised by the Colombian guerrilla FARC-EP, according to an expert report in which alleged e-mails were found. Several defendants for this kidnapping were imprisoned to more than 20 years in prison, including Paraguayan police personnel.

In light red: the EPP's areas of insurgent influence. In dark red: the areas where the PPE has or has had its bases.

== Official Group (2008-present) ==
=== Formation and first official attack: Incident of Santa Herminia and Tacuatí (2008) ===
The Paraguayan People's Army was formed on March 1, 2008, according to a document found in Horqueta. However, the members of this armed group, including Carmen Villalba and Alcides Oviedo Brítez, had previously been organizing in what was the Partido Patria Libre. The party had recently taken part in national elections in 2003, featuring Tomas Zayas as a candidate for president.

The first EPP attack can be considered the one perpetrated on Sunday March 16, 2008, just a few days after it was officially founded. In this attack, the EPP members burned agricultural machinery from the Santa Herminia ranch in the department of Concepción, of soybean production with more than 20,000 hectares, belonging to the Brazilian businessman Nabort Boht. In a striking event, it was later learned that the Paraguayan peasants accused of being related to the insurgent group, in fact for two years had been making complaints about health conditions caused by the fumigation of agrochemicals in the Boht soybean field. Both the Concepción Governor's Office, the Prosecutor's Office and the Justice agreed with the rural inhabitants. Consequently, an arrest warrant was issued against the soybean businessman Nabor Both, whose complaints were all dismissed by the courts of the city of Horqueta.

The 31 of December 2008, the EPP carried out an attack on a military barracks in Tacuatí, in the department of San Pedro, where they stole weapons and torched the place. The barracks had little surveillance, which allowed the guerrillas to act without much difficulty. From prison, Carmen Villalba claimed responsibility of the attack on behalf of the EPP.

In response to the attack, the Armed Forces deployed a large joint operation in the area, the largest since the Chaco War, surprising Paraguayan society due to the quantity and quality of the equipment used in the operation. However, the search did not succeed in finding the whereabouts of the fugitives, although it brought some calm to the area.

=== Kidnapping of Luis Lindstron ===
The first kidnapping carried out by the organization under its current name occurred on July 31, 2008, taking as a victim the rancher, logger and former mayor of Tacuatí, Luis Alberto Lindstron. The EPP members took Lindstron's ranch around noon (located near Tacuati, on the border between the departments of San Pedro and Concepción), took the ranch's employees hostage, and waited for Lindstron, to then finally kidnap him the next day, then they went deep into the mountains of the area.

His release took place after 43 days, on September 12, 2008, upon payment of $130,000. After being released at night and wandering aimlessly in practically the middle of nowhere, he was found by a bus driver, who was making the journey from Asunción-Concepción, near the town of Horqueta.

On May 30, 2013 in the morning, he was shot to death by said group, in command of his truck, on a local road in the town of Tacuati Poty, department of San Pedro, for the motive of "not complying with the revolutionary laws.

=== Bomb in the Palace of Justice of Asunción (2009) ===
The 29 of April 2009, the armed group was attributed to placing a bomb inside the Palace of Justice in Asuncion, which after being discovered by a janitor, was taken by a security guard outside the building where it exploded. The following day, Carmen Villalba from her place of detention confirmed the responsibility of the attack.

=== Kidnapping of Fidel Zavala ===
The 15 of October 2009, a rancher named Fidel Zavala Serrati was abducted from his stay Hugua Ñandú, Paso Barreto in the department of Concepción.

The December to January 2010, the Zavala family was forced to donate meat of their livestock to poor families, obeying the steps of a booklet made by the EPP for the subsequent release of the landowner as part of negotiations with the kidnappers. Said meat was delivered as "courtesy of the EPP" (according to the captors) to underprivileged communities in the area and in the country's capital. However, one of the three target groups did not accept the food load for fear of possible reprisals from the government.

Finally, on January 17, around 8:00 p.m., Zavala was released after 94 days of captivity, after a ransom payment of about USD 550,000, among other things. He was found about 10 kilometers from his ranch, the same place where he had been kidnapped. Immediately after the release of Fidel Zavala, the National Police announced that controls would be carried out in the north of the country in order to capture the perpetrators of the kidnapping.

=== Fall of first leaders and declaration of state of exception (2010) ===
The 14 of April 2010, there was a clash between Severiano Martinez, a member of the EPP, and a policeman who was administrator of a stay, close to the military detachment in Agua Dulce, in the department of Alto Paraguay in the Chaco Paraguay. In this confrontation the three people were injured, and Severiano Martínez managed to escape, and settle in the dense mountains of the Chaco.

Immediately after the confrontation, members of the FOPE, special forces of the Police went to the place to look for Martínez. Some rumors affirm that Martínez was hiding in that area of the Chaco to prepare a new EPP coup, although another hypothesis is the one that states that Martínez disagreed with his companions, which is why he was hiding in that area, far from the traditional area. of action of the EPP, which is the department of Concepción. On July 28, there was a new confrontation in Mar Dulce, between Severiano Martínez, and the Police, which would end with the death of the first. Later, the autopsy would confirm the identity of the man killed as Severiano Martínez, as well as that he already had a deadly infection in the brain, as a result of the shotgun he suffered in the first confrontation, Martínez received three bullet wounds with an exit hole, one in the face and two others in the abdominal area. After the confirmation of the autopsy result, the body of the aforementioned EPP member was handed over to his family members.

The 21 of April 2010, after days of the incident with Severiano Martinez, in another confrontation, 4 people killed in a shootout with members of the EPP. The place of the incident is the Santa Adelia ranch, in Arroyito, Horqueta district, Concepción department. The deceased persons are a policeman and three private guards of the stay.

After the confrontation, the government sent a large police reinforcement to that area of the country, and has implemented the state of exception, so that the Military Forces can take action if necessary, in five departments of the country (Concepción - Amambay - San Pedro - President Hayes - Canindeyú).

In May 2010, in the midst of a declaration of a state of emergency in force, military personnel had the task of arresting Magna Meza-presumed leader of the EPP at that time-, who would be on a children's birthday in the town of Hugua Ñandú, department of Concepción. What seemed like an excellent plan to arrest one of the leaders of the EPP, ended up being a confusing and serious incident, in which military and police officers (from the area) faced gunfire, thus producing a national scandal that crossed borders.

In September 2010, within three weeks, two senior members of the EPP died. They are Gabriel Zárate Cardozo, killed after a confrontation with the Police in Canindeyú, and Nimio Cardozo Cáceres, who died in identical circumstances in the town of Hugua Ñandú, Department of Concepción.

As of 21 of September 2011, another serious incident is repeated, in which members of the EPP used all types of heavy weapons and an explosive to attack Captain subpolice Giménez, confirmed a senior police chief Concepción. The attack left two policemen dead, one of them with 16 bullet wounds. The attack lasted approximately 10 minutes, after which time the attackers fell back. One of the agents of the place managed to shoot one of the members of the group, although it is not certain whether he was injured. Vicente Casco, who was shot 16 times, and Salvador Fernández, both non-commissioned officers of the Police, were killed at the scene.

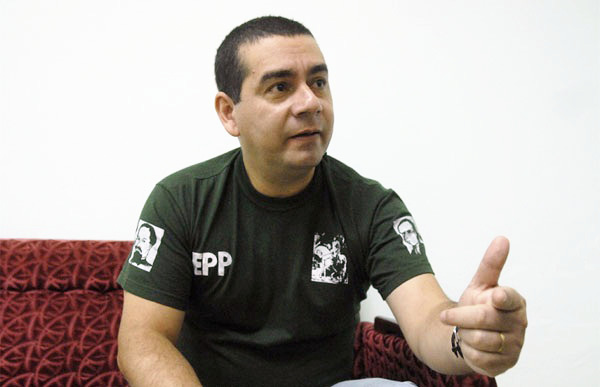
Alcides Oviedo Brítez, current leader of the EPP.

=== Kidnapping of Arlan Fick and Edelio Morinigo (2014) ===
On Wednesday 2 of April 2014, Paso Tuya department of Concepción was the scene of a firefight waged in a house between the Joint Task Force (FTC) of the army and guerrilleros of the EPP, who managed to down the military but suffered two casualties.

The bloody episode managed to be projected in time, since while the guerrillas escaped, they took as hostage Isaac Arce, a businessman, and the 16-year-old Arlan Fick, son of the owner of the silo. The businessman was assassinated with three shots to the head and his body was found two days later. Then an officer of the armed forces, Edelio Morinigo, went in search of the EPP and was also taken hostage.

The armed group put two conditions to release Arlan. The first was to broadcast with video, where the guerrillas killed in the confrontation with the Paraguayan army, Bernal Maíz and Silva Martínez, are vindicated, while the second was to distribute food - worth 50 thousand dollars - to two communities of Concepción. To free Edelio Morinigo, the EPP made it a condition that six captured members be released.

For its part, the government announced that it would not intervene in the negotiations between the family and the captors. The interior minister, Francisco de Vargas, stated that the situation of the kidnapping limits the actions of the forces, "since it is a question of a life at stake." This was said by demonstrating that for the government the only one who was kidnapped was Arlan Fick.

The family followed the orders to the letter, paying a sum of US $500,000, however, the EPP continued without releasing the 16-year-old. Days after the kidnapping, there were marches calling for the release of Fick and Edelio Morinigo. Subsequently, on December 25, 2014, Arlan was released by the armed group, a few kilometers from Yby Yaú, in Colonia Nueva Esperanza, Azotey district, Concepción department. He was found after walking blindfolded for several hours.

However, NCO Edelio Morinigo did not have the same fate, considering that after 1377 days of kidnapping, on April 11, 2018, the FTC found a pamphlet in a camp of the self-styled EPP, where it "confirmed" the death of the sub official and would also have details of where the body would be buried. Among the evidence seized during the operation are large-caliber weapon cartridges, gunmen, a notebook and a ski mask with the acronym of the EPP. Edelio would be the person who spent the longest time in captivity in the hands of the criminal group, and the longest kidnapping in the history of Paraguay.

=== EPP Division: ACA and EML ===
In 2014 a division of the EPP was confirmed, thus emerging a new group called the Armed Peasant Association (ACA). According to information handled by the investigators, the division of the group occurred due to a lack of discipline on the part of the Jara Larrea, who did not want to obey or comply with the demands imposed by the group's leader, Osvaldo Villalba. With this, the new group arose whose main area of influence was the town of Arroyito, department of Concepción, whose leaders were Albino and Alfredo Jara Larrea.

On August 27, 2016, on a local road of the settlement core 6 - Arroyito, located in the district of Horqueta, in Concepción department, a fatal attack occurred between members of the FTC and the ACA. The insurgents ambushed a mobile patrol of the Paraguayan army with a roadside bomb and automatic weapons, killing one officer and eight non-commissioned officers. The guerrillas stole their M-4 carbines and a light machine gun, along with 1,500 round of ammunitions. The incident took place near the village of Arroyito, east of Concepción.

Two years after its 'creation', the FTC confirmed the extinction of ACA with the death of its leaders. In March 2017, a journalist for ABC Color, a correspondent in Horqueta, found a pamphlet and a memory card on the wall of her home, related to a new guerrilla group, called "Army of Mariscal López" (EML). It is presumed that it arose from a detachment of the EPP, and was founded on April 2, 2016 according to the brief. They allegedly kidnapped Félix Urbieta a year later.

=== Kidnapping of Northern Mennonites and Others (2015-2017) ===
Abraham Fehr, one of the Mennonites kidnapped by the EPP, was last seen on August 8, 2015 in his farm, located in the town of Manitoba, department of San Pedro. Two of his sons and one of his foremen were also victims of kidnapping, but were immediately released. Fehr's family paid the ransom of about USD 100,000, however, the payment was made "out of time" and did not reach the kidnappers. After the ransom payment and without proof of life, on January 11, 2018, using coordinates provided by the EPP, through a pamphlet found in the establishment. In a “San Eduardo” ranch in Tacuatí, San Pedro, they found bone remains that were later confirmed to be Abraham Fehr's. Weeks later, the criminal group confirms that Fehr's death date was six days after he was kidnapped.

Franz Wiebe, a minor at the time of his abduction (17 years old), was kidnapped on July 27, 2016 and released on February 25, 2017, near where he had been kidnapped. Something striking about this kidnapping is that the EPP acknowledges that it kidnapped the young man by mistake. However, they also imposed conditions on his family to be released, such as the delivery of food for USD 25,000 to various indigenous communities in the area.

A German couple, Robert Natto and his wife Erika de Natto, were kidnapped on January 28, 2015. However, they were assassinated hours after their kidnapping by the criminal group on the run, during a shootout with the Joint Task Force (FTC), in Yby Yaú (near national route 3).

The Mennonite settler Gerardo Wall Rempel was kidnapped on March 17, 2017, around 7:30 p.m. in the vicinity of the López Salinas settlement, near the Río Verde neighborhood of the Santa Rosa del Aguaray district, north of the San Pedro department. However, he was conspicuously released and found hours later in the house of a foreman named Ramón Escobar, on March 18 at around 5:00 a.m. In the short period of kidnapping, Wall said they did not ask him for money, but he was sued for the fumigations of his corn field on a rented farm. According to subsequent investigations, it was concluded that in reality those who carried out this plagiarism were not authentic members of the EPP, but "aspiring" criminal groups.

Other kidnapped Mennonites are Franz Hiebert - kidnapped on August 21, 2017 from the Santa Clara neighborhood, Tacuatí, when he was in the San Eduardo Mennonite ranch - who was in captivity for 168 days. On the other hand, Bernhard Blatz was the last person kidnapped by the armed group, who was kidnapped on September 1, 2017 - just days after Hiebert's kidnapping - in the Río Verde neighborhood, San Pedro department; despite the fact that the Joint Task Force has three bases installed there. This last plagiarism occurred just about 3 km from the urban area of the city of Santa Rosa del Aguaray.

Both were released on February 5, 2018 in the morning. For both, a total of USD 1,250,000 was paid (USD 500,000 for Hiebert, USD 750,000 for Blatz) One of the hostages still in captivity is Félix Urbieta, kidnapped since October 12, 2016, by the Army of Mariscal López (EML), a detachment from the EPP.

=== Incidents in the Government of Mario Abdo Benítez (2018-present) ===
On 7 December 2018, the EPP perpetrated an attack in San Vicente Pancholo. The last attack occurred on December 22, 2018 at 10:00 p.m., in which members of the criminal group murdered the security guard Nery Germán Araújo Esteche, who received six shots from a shotgun and a rifle. The incident occurred at 10:00 p.m. on Saturday at the Santa Teresa ranch, located in the Estrellita neighborhood.

On 29 February 2020, a tractor used for pest fumigation was set on fire in the town of Tacuatí, Department of San Pedro, a well-known area of influence of the guerrillas where several attacks have been carried out in previous years.

On 2 September 2020, in an operation by the Joint Task Force of Paraguay (FTC) against the EPP in a camp of the EPP located in the town of Yby Yaú, two Argentine girls who were in the camp were killed by FTC agents, causing an international uproar. The UN and the Government of Argentina demanded to clarify the death of the two girls. After the event, demonstrations against the Paraguayan government were called in various Paraguayan embassies. The government, however, stated that the group used the girls as human shields. On the other hand, the camp was the "largest and most complete" that the FTC entourage have found, as they found weapons of different calibers, electric generators, money in guaraníes and US dollars, animals, supplies, and other objects. A dozen EPP members fled to the jungle, while Paraguayan soldiers confiscated a number of weapons and equipment. A Paraguayan officer was wounded.

=== Kidnapping of Óscar Denis (2020) ===
On 9 September 2020, former Paraguayan vice president Óscar Denis—who served under President Federico Franco from 2012 to 2013—was kidnapped near his ranch in Yby Yaú, Concepción. The abduction occurred in the afternoon, a few kilometers from the site where two Argentine girls had recently been killed during a security operation against a guerrilla group. Authorities indicated that the kidnapping may have been carried out in retaliation for those deaths. According to initial investigations, responsibility for the abduction was attributed to the group's so-called "Indigenous Brigade", reportedly composed of members of indigenous origin.

== Controversies ==
=== Allegations of use of the EPP as an excuse to persecute peasants ===
According to a person in charge of the Concepción diocese, reported by cath.ch, the Paraguayan authorities would use the pretext of the EPP's terrorism to criminalize the economic and social demands of the peasants. Peasant trade unionists are allegedly assassinated by the army and presented as guerrillas, while families are displaced by the army and forced to give up their lands to Brazilian landowners or companies.

=== Alleged connection with the FARC ===
Before and during the kidnapping of Cecilia Cubas in 2004, it was argued that kidnappers and some members of the FARC (a high-power Colombian guerrilla at that time) had already been communicating to plan their kidnapping and its development, according to subsequent expert opinions in emails. In this context, the Paraguayan government dictates orders to capture Colombian citizens Rodrigo Granda and Hermes Aguilar (Orley Jurado Palomino).

In August 2009, the State Attorney General's Office announced that it has sufficient evidence to prove a relationship between the Revolutionary Armed Forces of Colombia and the EPP. For its part, the EPP denies having links with the FARC and denounces that the Government and the media use as a strategy and propaganda to accuse the EPP of having links with drug traffickers to trivialize the EPP's struggle accuse them of terrorists before public opinion.

=== Espionage by the government ===
The Paraguayan government asked the DEA for authorization to use its mobile communication interception technology (supposedly aimed exclusively at combating drug trafficking) with the declared attempt to spy to EPP. They were denied access to records, but did agree to collaborate with Paraguayan court-ordered mandates.
