= Paraguayan National Futsal Championship =

Campeonato Nacional de Fútbol de Salón
- Founded: 1965
- Region: Paraguay
- Teams: 16
- Current champions: Horqueta (2nd title)
- Most championships: Amambay and Paranaense (9 titles)
- Website: fpfs.com.py

The Campeonato Nacional de Fútbol de Salón (Spanish for National Futsal Championship) is a futsal Championship held every year in Paraguay. The championship was organized by Federación de Fútbol de Salón del Interior (FEFUSI) from 1965 to 2008, since the XXXIX edition (2009) the tournament is organized by Federación Paraguaya de Fútbol de Salón (FPFS).

== List of champions ==
| Edition | Year | Host city | Champion |
|---|---|---|---|
| I | 1965 | Asunción | Amambay |
| II | 1967 | Pedro Juan Caballero | Concepción |
| III | 1969 | San Ignacio | Areguá |
| IV | 1970 | Encarnación | Encarnación |
| V | 1974 | San Ignacio | San Ignacio |
| VI | 1976 | Lambaré | Areguá |
| VII | 1977 | Caacupé | Caacupé |
| VIII | 1978 | Caaguazú | Coronel Oviedo |
| IX | 1979 | Encarnación | Paranaense |
| X | 1980 | Ciudad del Este | Paranaense |
| XI | 1981 | Coronel Oviedo | Caaguazú |
| XII | 1982 | Concepción | Lambaré |
| XIII | 1983 | Villa Hayes | Paranaense |
| XIV | 1984 | Caacupé | Paranaense |
| XV | 1985 | Ciudad del Este | Paranaense |
| XVI | 1986 | Villarrica | Paranaense |
| XVII | 1987 | Encarnación | Amambay |
| XVIII | 1988 | Villa Hayes | Villa Hayes |
| XIX | 1989 | Pedro Juan Caballero | Villarrica |
| XX | 1990 | Encarnación | Amambay |
| XXI | 1991 | Ciudad del Este | Paranaense |
| XXII | 1992 | Mariano Roque Alonso | Paranaense |
| XXIII | 1993 | Caaguazú | Presidente Franco |
| XXIV | 1994 | San Ignacio | Amambay |
| XXV | 1995 | Pedro Juan Caballero | Amambay |
| XXVI | 1996 | Concepción | Concepción |
| XXVII | 1997 | Villa Hayes | Amambay |
| XXVIII | 1998 | Caaguazú | Caaguazú |
| XXIX | 1999 | Presidente Franco | Presidente Franco |
| XXX | 2000 | Mariano Roque Alonso | Amambay |
| XXXI | 2001 | Encarnación | Presidente Franco |
| XXXII | 2002 | Presidente Franco | Presidente Franco |
| XXXIII | 2003 | Coronel Oviedo | Amambay |
| XXXIV | 2004 | Caacupé | Caacupé |
| XXXV | 2005 | Ciudad del Este | Presidente Franco |
| XXXVI | 2006 | Villa Hayes | Villa Hayes |
| XXXVII | 2007 | Pedro Juan Caballero | Amambay |
| XXXVIII | 2008 | Coronel Oviedo | Presidente Franco |
| XXXIX | 2009 | Caaguazú | Caaguazú |
| XL | 2010 | Ypacaraí | Ypacaraí |
| XLI | 2011 | Concepción | Presidente Franco |
| XLII | 2012 | Presidente Franco | Presidente Franco |
| XLIII | 2013 | Horqueta | Horqueta |
| XLIV | 2014 | Villarrica | Paranaense |
| XLV | 2015 | San Ignacio | Horqueta |
| XLVI | 2016 | Concepción | Concepción |
| XLVII | 2017 | Itapúa | Villa Hayes |

== Titles by teams ==
| Team | Titles | Years |
|---|---|---|
| Paranaense | 9 | (1979, 1980, 1983, 1984, 1985, 1986, 1991, 1992, 2014) |
| Amambay | 9 | (1965, 1987, 1990, 1994, 1995, 1997, 2000, 2003, 2007) |
| Presidente Franco | 8 | (1993, 1999, 2001, 2002, 2005, 2008, 2011, 2012) |
| Villa Hayes | 3 | (1988, 2006, 2017) |
| Concepción | 3 | (1967, 1996, 2016) |
| Caaguazú | 3 | (1981, 1998, 2009) |
| Caacupé | 2 | (1977, 2004) |
| Horqueta | 2 | (2013, 2015) |
| Areguá | 2 | (1969, 1976) |
| Ypacaraí | 1 | (2010) |
| Villarrica | 1 | (1989) |
| Lambaré | 1 | (1982) |
| Coronel Oviedo | 1 | (1978) |
| San Ignacio | 1 | (1974) |
| Encarnación | 1 | (1970) |

== See also ==
- Futsal in Paraguay
- Paraguay national futsal team
- Campeonato de Futsal de Paraguay
