= Romeo Benítez =

Paraguayan footballer (born 2002)

Personal information
- Full name: Bernardo Romeo Benítez Fariña
- Date of birth: 14 November 2002 (age 23)
- Place of birth: Sargento José Félix López, Paraguay
- Height: 1.70 m (5 ft 7 in)
- Position: Winger

Team information
- Current team: Olimpia (on loan from Athletico Paranaense)
- Number: 28

Youth career
- Cerro Corá de Concepción
- 2017–2022: Guaraní

Senior career*
| Years | Team | Apps | (Gls) |
| 2022–2023 | Guaraní | 52 | (7) |
| 2024– | Athletico Paranaense | 5 | (1) |
| 2024–2025 | → Tigre (loan) | 11 | (0) |
| 2025– | → Olimpia (loan) | 1 | (0) |
- * Club domestic league appearances and goals as of 16:31, 19 July 2025 (UTC)

Bernardo Romeo Benítez Fariña (born 14 November 2002) is a Paraguayan professional footballer who plays mainly as a left winger for Olimpia, on loan from Brazilian club Athletico Paranaense.

== Career ==
=== Guaraní ===
Born in Sargento José Félix López, Benítez joined Guaraní's youth setup at the age of 15, from hometown club Club Sportivo Cerro Corá de Concepción. He made his first team – and Primera División – debut on 9 April 2022, starting in a 1–0 away win over Sportivo Ameliano.

Benítez scored his first professional goal on 21 May 2022, netting his team's third in a 4–0 away routing of General Caballero JLM. He started to feature more regularly in the 2023 season, and scored a brace in a 2–1 home win over Sportivo Luqueño on 24 September of that year.

=== Athletico Paranaense ===
On 19 December 2023, Benítez was announced at Campeonato Brasileiro Série A side Athletico Paranaense on a five-year contract.

== Career statistics ==
As of 19 December 2023

| Club | Season | League | | | Cup | | Continental | | Other | | Total | |
| Club | Season | Division | Apps | Goals | Apps | Goals | Apps | Goals | Apps | Goals | Apps | Goals |
|---|---|---|---|---|---|---|---|---|---|---|---|---|
| Guaraní | 2022 | Primera División | 20 | 2 | — | | — | | — | | 20 | 2 |
| Guaraní | 2023 | Primera División | 32 | 5 | 2 | 1 | 8 (Note: Appearance(s) in Copa Sudamericana) | 2 | — | | 42 | 8 |
| Guaraní | Total | | 52 | 7 | 2 | 1 | 8 | 2 | — | | 62 | 10 |
| Athletico Paranaense | 2024 | Série A | 0 | 0 | 0 | 0 | 0 | 0 | 0 | 0 | 0 | 0 |
| Career total | | | 52 | 7 | 2 | 1 | 8 | 2 | 0 | 0 | 62 | 10 |
