= Perito (surname) =

Perito is a surname. Notable people with the surname include:

- Miguel López Perito, Paraguayan politician
- Nick Perito (1924–2005), American composer and arranger
