= San Carlos del Apa =

- City
- San Carlos
- Location within Paraguay
- Coordinates: 22°16′0″S 57°20′0″W
- Country: Paraguay
- Department: Concepción

Government
  - Intendente municipal: Luis Aníbal Schupp

Area
  - Total: 2,036 km^{2} (786 sq mi)
- Elevation: 123 m (404 ft)

Population
  - Total: 2,742
  - Density: 0.33/km^{2} (0.85/sq mi)
- Time zone: -4 Gmt
- Postal code: 8930
- Climate: Aw

District Coat of Arms

San Carlos del Apa or San Carlos is a city of Paraguay in the Concepción Department, and a historical site located between River Apa and Stream Blandengues.

== Geography ==
San Carlos is far from Asunción at 589 km, 90 km from the Brazilian port of the same name "San Carlos do Apa" and 200 km from Concepción. It is located on the border with Brazil.

== Climate ==
The maximum temperature reaches 40 degrees in summer, while the minimum in winter is up to minus 2 degrees. The average is 24 degrees Celsius.

The rainfall times are plentiful from November to January, and the driest months are from June to September. Winds are from the north, east and southeast.

== Demographics ==
San Carlos has a total of 690 inhabitants, of which 438 are men and 252 women. In urban areas there are 444 people and in rural areas 246.

== Economy ==
Residents of San Carlos are principally engaged in livestock and agriculture. The city is a reserve of clover plantation.

San Carlos has a landing field for light aircraft.

== Getting there ==
You reach the city by the west through farms, and by the east, passing through agricultural settlements, such as Colony Jose Felix Lopez, "Puentesiño" and Paso Bravo National Park. It has runways for air transport.

It is located 680 km north of Asunción.

== History ==
The Fortress of San Carlos was built in 1796 by order of Governor of Paraguay, Don Joaquin de Alos y Bru, years after the founding of the Villa Real de la Concepcion, on a small hill a few metres from the Apa River, with the aim of defending the region against the advance of bandits and Mbayaés Indians allied with the conquerors from Brazil. There, several battles were fought. The Governor sent the commander of Villa Real de Concepción, Don Luis Bernardo Ramirez on an expedition to establish a fort on the banks of River Apa. It also had barracks, housing, oratory, storage and cooking places for the soldiers guarding it. It is a sign of the presence of Spaniards since late 1700 and the government of José Gaspar Rodríguez de Francia. During the Paraguayan War there were fought several battles at the site, in 1867, Cnel. Urbieta defeated Brazilian troops and thus regained control of the fort.

== Tourist attractions ==
San Carlos is considered historic and touristic, because the ruins of Fort San Carlos del Apa are located there, scenario of numerous battles. The fort has high walls surrounding it and nowadays receives many tourists.

The area surrounding San Carlos is characterized by a landscape that includes the Caxoeira hills in Brazil and the Cerro Paiva, Paraguay. The Apa River runs through the area and is navigable, with fishing among the activities practiced along the river.

The Fortress of San Carlos is part of both Paraguay and Brazil's heritage. It is very close to the border with Mato Grosso.
