= Concepción massacre =

19th century atrocity in Paraguayan War

Coordinates: 23°24′0″S 57°25′48″W

The Concepción massacre was an episode of the Paraguayan War where various Paraguayan families of Concepción's landowning classes were murdered between April and May 1869 under Paraguayan president Francisco Solano López's orders, ostensively to combat a conspiracy aimed at himself. Major José Gregório Benítez, known as Toro Pichai (hirsute bull in Guarani), famed as a torturer, was sent to the region to execute the task.

When Benítez arrived in a town, he would order all its population to assemble in a square, and, armed with a list containing the names of the families to be executed, separated them; given the extent of the country's mobilization these were mostly women, who were tortured and then killed with lances. Doratioto claims "dozens of people, accused of conspiracy, were murdered with lances", "under Solano López's orders".

Alternatively, Luc Capdevila claims that the massacre was a punitive expedition ordered by López against the town's commandant, who was suspected of having ordered it to be an "open city" to the encroaching Brazilian forces after the fall of Asunción. Capdevila agrees that "many dozens of women and young ones [...] were massacred".

== See also ==
- 1868 San Fernando massacre
