= Arroyito, Paraguay =

Arroyito
- City and district
- Location within Paraguay
- Coordinates: 23°10′24″S 56°46′29″W
- Country: Paraguay
- Department: Concepción
- Foundation: 22 November 2016

Area
  - Total: 880 km^{2} (340 sq mi)
- Elevation: 163 m (535 ft)

Population (2017)
  - Total: 22,100
- Time zone: -4 Gmt
- Postal code: 8820
- Area code: 595 32
- Climate: Aw

Arroyito is a city and district located in the Concepción Department of Paraguay. It is one of the newest districts in the country, created in November 2016.
