= List of retired Paraguayan military aircraft =

The List of retired Paraguayan military aircraft is a list of historic military aircraft that have served with the Armed Forces of Paraguay since the acquisition of its first airplanes in the late 1910s.

Aircraft	Origin	Years	Number	Role	Note	Image
Ansaldo SVA 5	Italy	1922–?	2	Fighter/Reconnaissance	Used in the 1922 Civil War primarily in reconnaissance duties; protagonist of the first dogfight in South America.	
Ansaldo SVA 10	Italy	1922–?	1	Fighter/Reconnaissance	Used in the 1922 Civil War primarily in reconnaissance duties.	
Armstrong Whitworth F.K.8	United Kingdom	1921–1922	1	Bomber/Reconnaissance	Used in the 1922 Civil War primarily in reconnaissance duties; one unit only, shot down during the conflict.	
SAML S.1	Italy	1922-?	2	Reconnaissance	Used in the 1922 Civil War primarily in reconnaissance duties. After the conflict, they were employed as trainers.	
T-6 Texan	United States	1943–1991	48	Trainer	Mostly bought from South African and Brazilian stocks. 3 units used by the naval aviation.	
Breda Ba.65	Italy	1938–?	3	Light bomber		
Bréguet 14	France	1922	1	Bomber	Used in the 1922 Civil War.	
CANT 26	Italy	1932-1933	1	Liaison	Used in the Chaco War as a liaison aircraft; one unit only, lost in an accident.	
Caproni AP.1	Italy	1939–1949	7	Fighter/bomber	Used in the 1947 Civil War.	
Caproni Ca.309	Italy	1939-1945	2	Transport		
PBY Catalina	United States	1955–1956	2	River patrol	Later transferred to national air transport service	
Douglas C-47	United States	1954–2003	34	Transport		
Fairchild PT-19	United States	1940–1972	29	Light attack/Trainer	Used in the 1947 Civil War.	
Fiat CR.20bis	Italy	1927-1939	5	Fighter	Used in the Chaco War.	
Hanriot HD.1	France	1923–1926	3	Fighter		
Junkers A50	Germany	1930–1937	2	?	Active during the Chaco War.	
Muniz M-9	Brazil	1939–?	2	Trainer		
Piper Cub	United States	1940–1975	4	Trainer		
Potez 25	France	1928–1940	14	Bomber	Used in the Chaco War.	
SPAD S.20	France	1922–1925	1	Light attack/Reconnaissance	Active during the 1922 Civil War. Used as a trainer after the conflict.	
Vultee BT-13	United States	1942–1968	15	Trainer/river patrol	Three units used by naval aviation.	
Wibault 7	France	1929–?	7	Fighter/Reconnaissance	Used in the Chaco War.	
Lockheed T-33	United States	1991–1998	6	Fighter	Aircraft donated by Taiwan.	
Hiller UH-12	United States	1962–1993	8	Utility	Mostly donated by Chile.	
Fokker S-11	Netherlands	1970–1978	8	Trainer	Former Brazilian aircraft.	
Douglas DC-6	United States	1975–1988	3	Transport		
de Havilland Canada DHC-6	Canada	1968–2004	1	Utility		
Cessna T-41	United States	1973–1989	5	Trainer		
Boeing 707	United States	1994–2004	1	VIP Transport	Used as presidential aircraft.	
H-13 Sioux	United States	1955–1986	10	Scout helicopter		
Super King Air	United States	1991–1994	1	VIP Transport	Used as presidential transport.	
Aerotec Uirapuru	Brazil	1975–1998	14	Trainer		
Aermacchi MB-326	Italy	1979–2007	10	Light attack	Manufactured by Embraer.	

== See also ==
- Paraguayan Air Force
