= Paso Barreto =

Coordinates: 23°04′S 57°07′W

- District
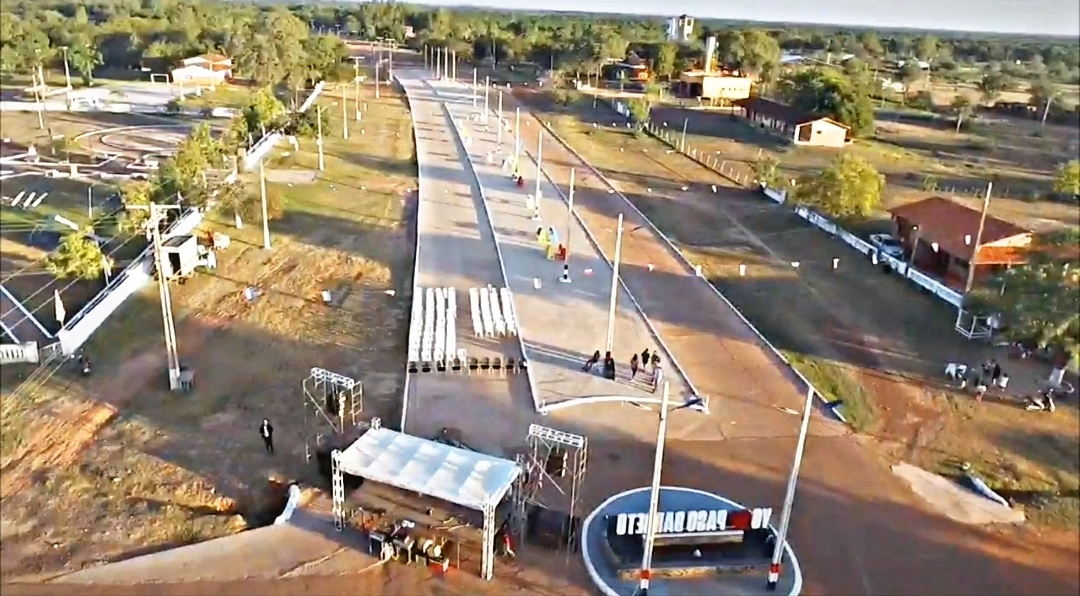
- Paseo Central "A Las Paraguayas"

- Location within Paraguay
- Country: Paraguay
- Department: Concepción
- Time zone: -4 Gmt

Paso Barreto is a district in the department of Concepción, Paraguay.
