= Naranjito =

Naranjito may refer to:

- Naranjito, Ecuador, a town in Ecuador
- Naranjito, Santa Bárbara, a municipality in Honduras
- Naranjito, Puerto Rico, a municipality in Puerto Rico
- Naranjito, Hatillo, Puerto Rico, a barrio
- Naranjito barrio-pueblo, a barrio and municipality seat
- Naranjito (mascot), the mascot of the 1982 Football World Cup held in Spain (an orange)
