= Ñu Guazú (Asunción) =

Coordinates: 25°16′S 57°33′W

- Barrio
- Interactive map of Ñu Guazú
- Country: Paraguay
- Autonomous Capital District: Gran Asunción
- City: Asunción

Ñu Guazú is a neighbourhood (barrio) of Asunción, the capital and largest city of Paraguay.
