= San Alfredo =

Coordinates: 26°02′S 55°08′W

- District
- Location within Paraguay
- Country: Paraguay
- Department: Concepción
- Time zone: -4 Gmt

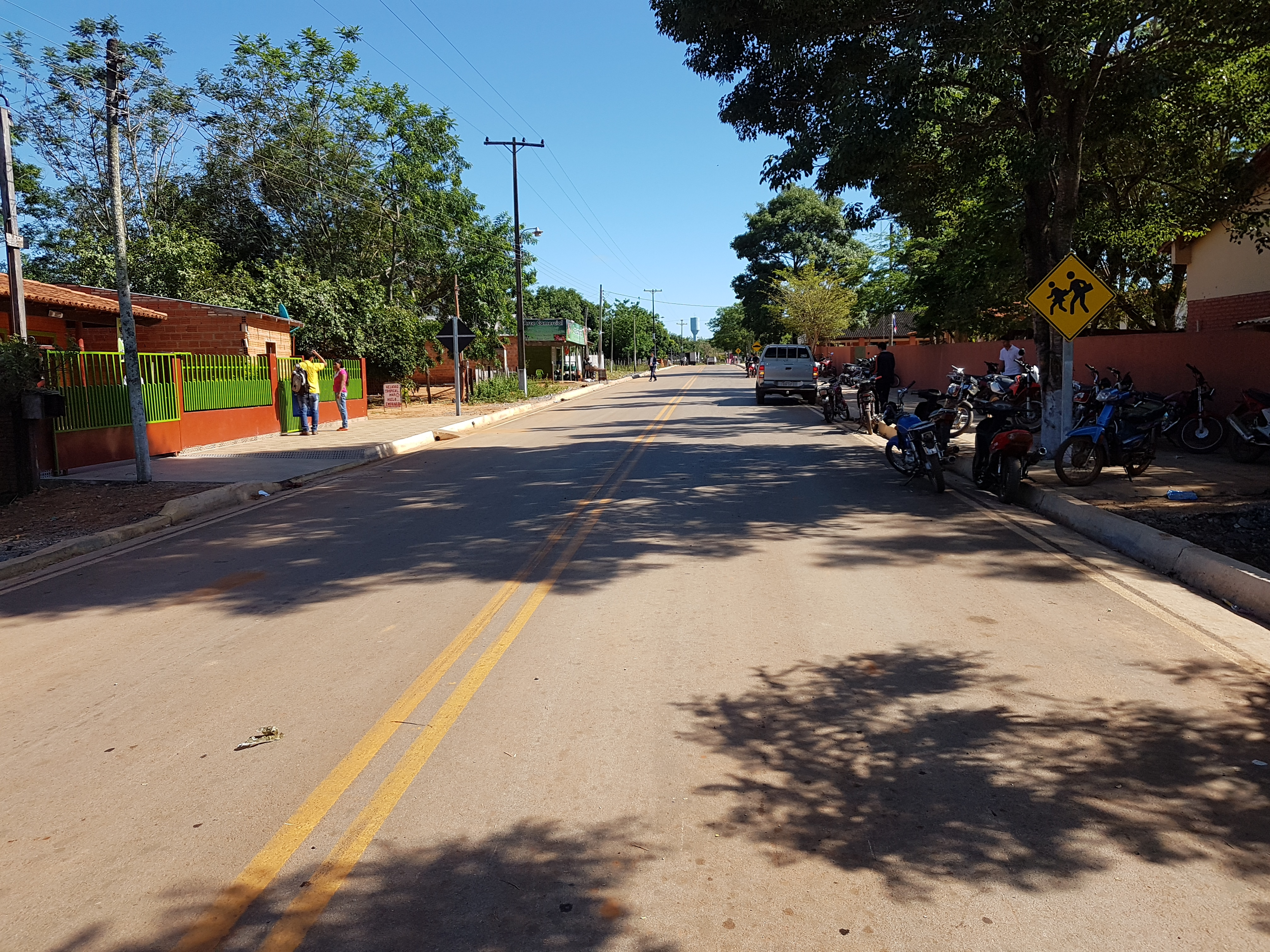

San Alfredo is a district in the department of Concepción, Paraguay.
