= Azotey =

- District
- Location within Paraguay
- Coordinates: 23.31878°S 56.48761°W
- Country: Paraguay
- Department: Concepción
- Time zone: -4 Gmt

Azotey (Guarani: Asote'y [asoteˈʔɨ]) is a district in the department of Concepción, Paraguay.

== Etymology ==
The word asote'y in Guarani means whip. It is a compound which agglutinates the Spanish word for whip (azote) and the Guarani term for handle (y).
