= Miguel López Perito =

Paraguayan politician

Miguel Lopez Perito was the Paraguayan Minister of the Presidency under President Fernando Lugo.
