= Sargento José Félix López =

Coordinates: 22°23′S 56°56′W

- District
- Location within Paraguay
- Country: Paraguay
- Department: Concepción
- Time zone: -4 Gmt

Coat of arms of the Sargento José Félix López district

Sargento José Félix López is a district in the department of Concepción, Paraguay.
