= Tacuatí =

- Location within Paraguay
- Coordinates: 23°27′0″S 56°35′24″W
- Country: Paraguay
- Department: San Pedro
- Elevation: 102 m (335 ft)

Population (2008)
  - Total: 2,991

Tacuatí is a town and district in Paraguay. Tacuatí is situated above the Rio Ypané at the northern border of the II Departmento de San Pedro de Ykuamandyjy.

== History ==
In October 2008, a 6 meter long female anaconda was found and killed there by local fishermen.

In the winter of 2008, a prominent local rancher and former municipal Intendente, Don Luis Lindstrom, was kidnapped for ransom, touching off a minor media storm during the months before the money was paid and his subsequent release.

At the end of 2008, armed bandits attacked a small military post about 13 kilometers outside of town. The attack was attributed to the Paraguayan People's Army (EPP).

== Economy ==
Current major economic activities include the cultivation of soy and sesame, and cattle ranching. Formerly home to large forests, followed by large sawmills and poorly managed cotton farms, followed by large stretches of parched and barren sand.

== Sources ==
- World Gazeteer: Paraguay – World-Gazetteer.com
