= Horqueta =

Horqueta Orkéta
- City
- Location within Paraguay
- Coordinates: 23°20′39″S 57°02′37″W
- Country: Paraguay
- Department: Concepción
- Founded: May 10, 1793
- Founder: Commander Juan Manuel Gamarra, by Priest Andrés Salinas

Government
  - Municipal intendant: Jorge Enrique Centurión Giménez

Area
  - Total: 2,889 km^{2} (1,115 sq mi)
- Elevation: 127 m (417 ft)

Population
  - Total: 60,031
  - Density: 18/km^{2} (47/sq mi)
- Postal code: 8820
- Area code: (595) (32)
- Climate: Aw

Horqueta (Guarani: Orkéta) is a city of Paraguay, in the department of Concepción, located 50 kilometers from Concepción City and 428 kilometers from Asunción. It is established on a hill.

== Toponymy ==
The name of the city has its origin in the name of an intersection of roads called "Tapé Horqueta", where carts camped after long journeys.

== Geography ==
The town of Horqueta is settled on a hill near intersecting roads.

=== Climate ===
The temperature reaches 40 °C in summer and drops to −2 °C in winter. The average is 20 °C. There is abundant rain from November through January, and the dry season is from June to September. Winds come from the north, east and southeast.

== Demographics ==
Horqueta has a population of 55,882 inhabitants, 28,936 men and 26,947 women, according to the General Direction of Statistics, Poll and Census.

== History ==
The city started with a chapel in the 18th century and was founded officially in 1793. It was the first city with a pedestrian street in the country.

It is the second most important city in the Concepción department.

== Economy ==
In this region the most important economical activity is the agriculture, there are plantations of cotton plants, spurge, beans, manioc, corn, fruits. There also are yerba mate mills, oil industries, forestall exploit and cotton desmotadora.

It is considered the "National Capital of Ka’a He’e" (a sweetener plant).

Another important activity is the craftsmanship of leather and also the cattle.

== Transportation ==
Located 428 kilometers from Asunción, it is possible to access to the city traveling the Route No. 3 "Gral. Elizardo Aquino" and reaching Yby Yau taking Route No. 5 "Gral. Bernardino Caballero".

From Horqueta, it is possible to access to the city Tacuatí, in San Pedro.

== Tourism ==
45 kilometers from Concepción, by the Route to Vallemí, in the banks of the Aquidabán River, there is the Paso Horqueta, a place with beaches of white sand and ideal for camping.

The Bridge Paso Horqueta is a monumental and picturesque wood bridge over the river.
