= Concepción Department, Paraguay =

Department of Paraguay

Concepción Departamento de Concepción (Spanish) Tetãvore Konsepsiõ (Guarani)
- Department
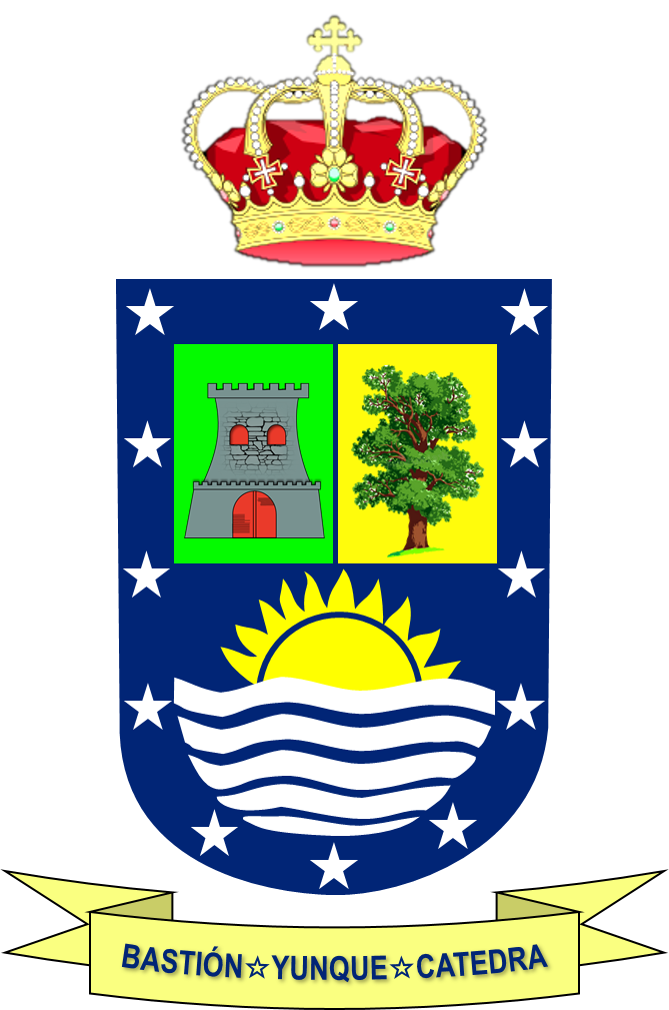
- Flag Coat of arms

- Coordinates: 23°00′S 57°00′W
- Country: Paraguay
- Capital: Concepción

Government
  - Governor: Liz Meza (ANR)

Area
  - Total: 18,057 km^{2} (6,972 sq mi)

Population (2022 census)
  - Total: 206,181
  - Density: 11.418/km^{2} (29.573/sq mi)
- Time zone: UTC-04 (AST)
  - Summer (DST): UTC-03 (ADT)
- ISO 3166 code: PY-1
- Number of Districts: 11

Concepción (Spanish pronunciation: [konseβˈsjon]) is a department of Paraguay. The capital is the city of Concepción.

== History ==
Throughout history, this department has suffered a great amount of population instability, especially in colonial times, due to the advance of the Brazilian "bandeirantes" through the east and the attacks of the Mbayá – Guaicurú natives of Chaco, which, by then, were the rulers of that region.

During the later years of the colony, it was organized a great campaign to re-conquest the invaded territories with the intention of defending by populating the region and also with the important task of the Jesuit that founded the city of Belén, of creating a Mission with the Mbayá natives, in the year 1760.

During the governments of Francia and López, the populating process got stronger and the north area of Paraguay became a territory dedicated to cattle. Francia ordered the construction of the penal colony of Tevego in 1813 in the Concepción department. Once the Paraguayan War was over, Concepción united with Amambay, constituting a great territory for forestall and yerba plantations.

In the Twentieth Century, Concepción was proclaimed to be the second most important city of the country and it became an active commercial center. Because of its bind with Mato Grosso it experienced important development during that time.

In the year 1906, with the first plan to arrange the national territory, it was proclaimed the first department. Its limits were established with the decree 426 of 1973, as we know them nowadays.

== Geography ==
=== Borders ===
Concepción is located in the northern part of the western region of Paraguay, between the parallels 22°00′ and 23°30′ South and meridians 58°00′ and 56°06′ West.

- To the North: The Federative Republic of Brazil, separated by the Apa River, from the mouth of the Paraguay River until the confluence with the Hermoso Stream.
- To the south: San Pedro Department, separated by the Ypané River from its confluence with the Guazú Stream until the mouth of the Paraguay River
- To the east: Amambay Department, separated by a straight line that goes from the mouth of the Hermoso Stream with the Apa River to the beginning of the Chacalnica Stream and Negla, and the Aquidabán River to the confluence with the Guazú Stream. From this point another straight line to the confluence of the Ypané-mi and the Ypané rivers to their confluence with the Guazú Stream
- To the west: Presidente Hayes and Alto Paraguay Departments, separated from them by the Paraguay River, between the mouths of the rivers Ypané and Apa

=== Districts ===
The department is divided into 14 districts:

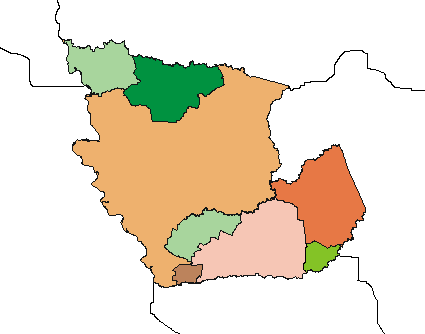
1. Arroyito
2. Azotey
3. Belén
4. Concepción
5. Horqueta
6. Loreto
7. Paso Barreto
8. San Alfredo
9. San Carlos
10. San Lázaro
11. Yby Yaú
12. Sargento José Félix López
13. Paso Horqueta
14. Itacuá

Note: The districts of Sargento José Félix López, Paso Barreto, San Alfredo, and others were created after the 2021 Census.

=== Climate ===
In summer, the temperature rises to 39 °C, and in winter, drops to 2 °C. The media is 24 °C. The rains can be about 1.324 mm. The wettest months are November, December and January, and the driest ones are June, July and August.

=== Orography and soil ===
The lands of this territory are of relatively high elevation, more so close to the northern and eastern frontiers, where they become mountainous. These are lands of calcareous origin, with a diversity of granite rocks and marble. The soil is very fertile. In the center and the north the land is a great territory for pasture, with woods and yerba fields.

In the south, the lands are high, with little pendants and woods.

To the north of the department, there is a succession of hills of low height; the elevations that are continuous form the Cordillera Quince Puntas, along with the mountain range of San Luis from north to south. The hills: Valle-mi, Medina, Pyta, Naranjahai, Itaipú Guazú and Sarambí, destacate from others.

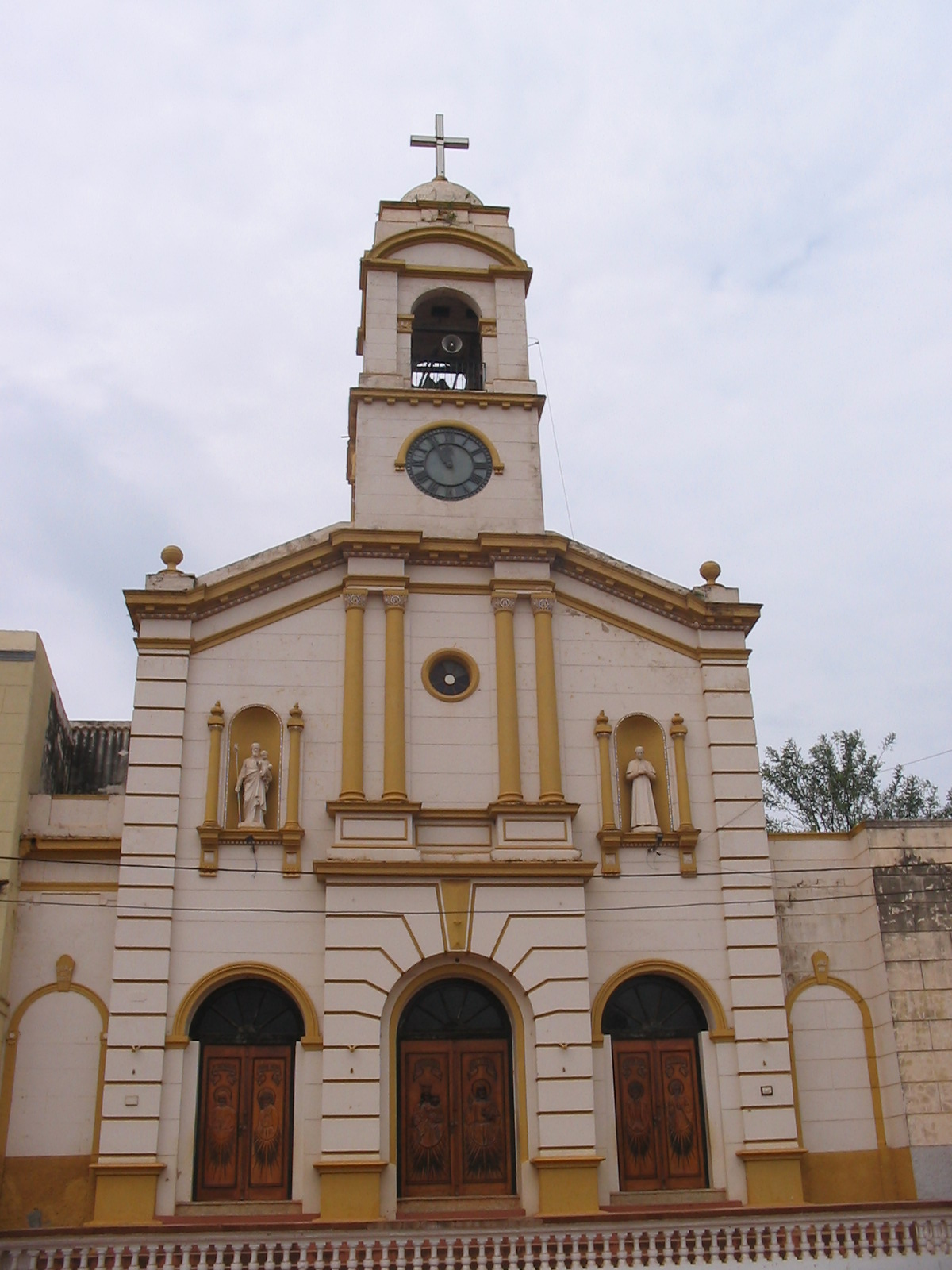
Concepción's main church

=== Hydrography ===
The Paraguay river runs to the west of Concepción along with the minor rivers Apa, Aquidabán and Ypané, and the streams that bathe the territory are: Estrella, Sirena, Apamí, Primero, Quiensabe, Negla, Trementina, Chacalnica, Tapyanguá, Pitanohaga, Guazú, Mbui'i, Ypanemí, Capiibary, Mboi Guazú.

The ports are:

- Port Concepción
- Port Vallemí
- Port Risso: it is mountain passes that produces lime, has rocky coasts, and have had several owners throughout history. There is an antique house built at the end of the 20th century, used to be a defense from the natives of Chaco, still stands in the place.
- Port Fonciere: an important watch point over the Paraguay River. There is a house from the year 1927.
- Por Max: port "Tres Ollas" is nowadays a ganadero establishment, right in front of the Port Pinasco.
- Port Arrecife: it has dangerous reefs. In time of bajada of the Paraguay River, it is ideal for fishing Dorado fish.
- Port Abente: port of cattle ranches, previously called "Port Kemmerich". It is near the Napeque Stream.
- Port Pagani: today it is abandoned.
- Port Negro: there are some cattle farms.
- Port Algesa: for shipment of goods.
- Port Antiguo: for passengers and shipment of goods.
- Port Itapucumí: in front of the Port Pinasco. Here, the remains of the first lime factory of the country can be found, oldest even from the one in Vallemí. The administrative building of the factory works as a limestone quarry. There work lime ovens and shipments to Asunción are also made.

There is an important watch tower over the Paraguay River and the Vallemí area.

- Port Itapúa: previously called "Calera Cué". Located opposite Port Fonciere. It has lime ovens and shipping is made to all kind of places from there. Right in front there is an island with beautiful beaches. The population is mainly of working class; there are commercial businesses and a school built with limestone.
- Port Guarati: is a famous limestone factory, about 10 km. from Port Itacuá.

=== Nature and vegetation ===
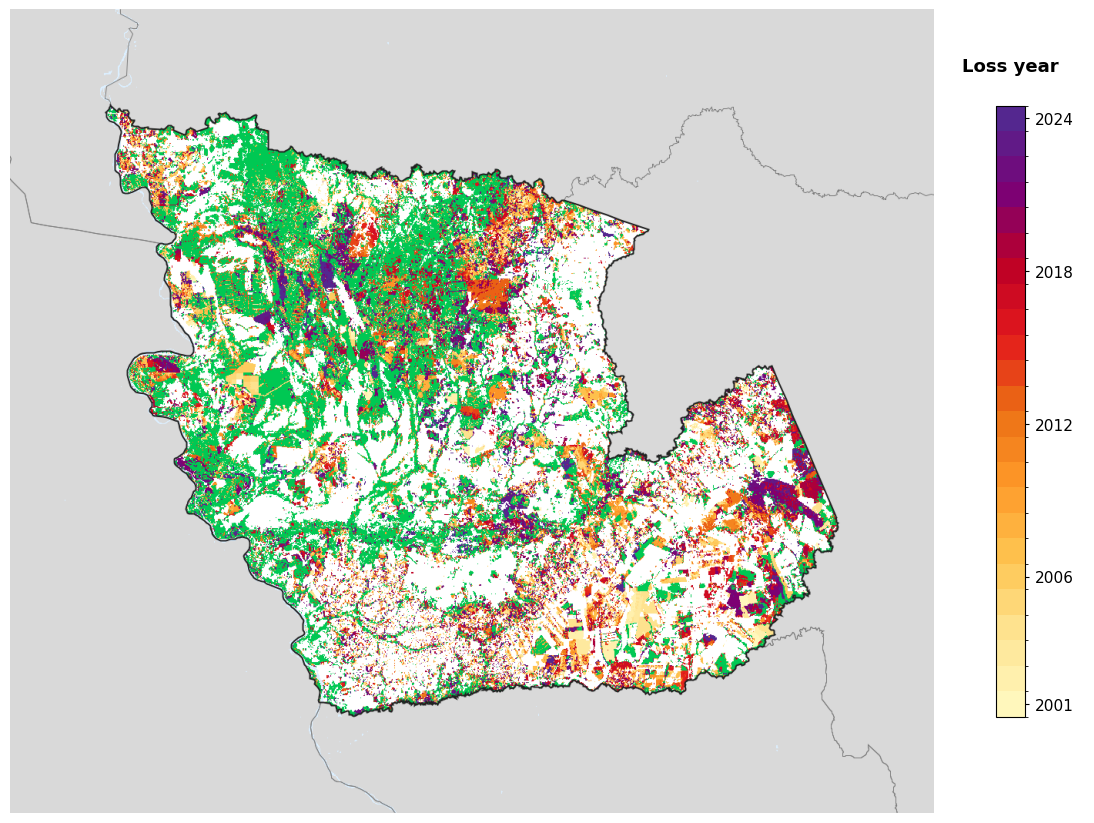
Tree-cover loss year in Concepción, 2001-2024, from the Global Forest Change dataset.

Concepción is set in the ecological region of Aquidabán, a part of region of Amambay and another part in the region of the Central Forest.

Deforestation is a big problem in this department because of the continuous advance of human activity, creating a great shock to the natural resources of the region. One of the biggest problems is the uncontrolled hunting of animals in the area.

Most of the forestall species are in extinction danger, as do the animals too. The ones that are in more risk of disappearing of the area are: the puma, yaguareté, gua'a pytá (red parrot), gua'a hovy (blue parrot), tucán, tacua guazú, mbo'i jagua, jacaré overo and lobopé.

Some of the protected areas are:

- The San Luis Mountain Range, 70,000 hectares
- Itapucumí, 45,000 hectares
- Estrella de Concepción, 2,400 hectares
- Laguna Negra, 10 hectares, this area is in danger nowadays

== Economy ==
In agriculture, the most important products are: cotton, sugar cane, maize, sesame seed, wheat and manioc. It is also important the production of bell pepper, sweet potatoes, banana, pepper, tártago, coffee, pineapple, grapefruit, and stevia.

The silviculture has diminished due to the massive deforestation in this region.

The breeding of animals is the third production of the country, surpassed only by Presidente Hayes and San Pedro's. The mortality rates for bovine cattle are relatively low. In Concepción is found the largest land of natural pasturing of the Oriental Region. There are also, porcine, ovine, and goat cattle in important percentage.

In Vallemí is the Cement National Industry, which has 150 lime extractor plants by the Paraguay River. And near the Apa River quarries of marble are exploit.

There are also other industries such as cold-storage plants, silos, mills and cotton gin industries.

== Communication and services ==
The Paraguay River is the most important waterway, because is navigable most of the territory that coasts Concepción, almost 230 km.

The Bioceanic Route crosses through the department. The Route 5 "Gral. Bernandino Caballero" communicates with Pedro Juan Caballero and connects with Route 3 "Gral. Elizardo Aquino", that takes to Asunción.

Another access to the department is through Pozo Colorado, a military depot, which connects with Route 9 "Carlos Antonio Lopez", also known as "Transchaco Route", in the Paraguayan Chaco.

There is 1,951 km (1,212 mi) of roads in the entire department; 720 km (450 mi) of them are paved while 146 km (91 mi) are pebbled. It is crossed by 362 interdepartmental roads.

The Mcal. Francisco Solano López Airport is located in Concepción City and there are more airways in other districts, and also in the most important cattle establishments.

There is phone service with direct dialed in Concepción City, Horqueta and Yby Yaú; in Belén and Loreto the service is with dialing through an operator.

The ratio stations in AM are: Radio Concepción, Radio Vallemí, Yby Yaú and Guyra Campana. In FM are: Vallemí, Itá Porá, Aquidabán, Los Ángeles, Continental, Belén, Norte Comunicaciones, among others. There are also television stations.

Concepción has 33,976 houses, 13,768 in the urban area and 20,208 in the rural area. There are 1,094 houses with running water.

== Education ==
There is 190 educational institutions for initial education. In a total of 393 primary schools, there are 39,692 students registered and in 63 high schools there are 9,636 students.

Concepción is seat of the Veterinary Filial Faculty of Asunción National University and the Science and Letters Filial Faculty of the Catholic University.

The department has educational establishments that teach classes for permanent, special, and technical education, as well as institutes to train teachers.

== Health ==
The department has 64 health institutions, hospitals, and health care centers distributed throughout the different districts. This is, without counting the private establishments.

== Tourism ==
Concepción has many tourist attractions, which are an important source of income for the department. One of them is the Tagatiya Stream, a place to do ecological tourism.

Old constructions can be found in Concepción City, the department's capital. These are an example of the area's history. Also a locomotive that worked until 1960 and a truck used in the Chaco War.

Here was located Francisco Solano Lopez barracks, from which he led the troops of Gral. Resquín in a military campaign to Matto Grosso, during the War Against the Triple Alliance.

The Fort San Carlos, in the Apa, is an interesting place to visit. It was built in time of the Colony as a defense mechanism against the invasions of Brazilian Bandeirantes.

The Kurusu Isabel Oratory, a few kilometers away from Concepción, receives many visitants.

A cruise is offered to navigate through the Paraguay River, and all the rivers and streams in the department offer the opportunity to practice many aquatic sports, fishing, sailing, and beachgoing.

The hills Paso Bravo and San Luis are very visited by tourists. Peña Hermosa Island is a hill of limestone situated in the Paraguay River.

The Aquidabán region has forests and large fields, lagoons, swamps and lakes. Trébol, Timbó, Red Quebracho, Karanda, Palo Blanco, Juasy'y Guazú, Urundey-mi, Kurupa'y, Curuñi, and Jata'i can be found in the forests; in the meadows, there are Arasupe; and in palm fields, Karanday.

The Primavera Country House, by the Aquidabán River, has beautiful beaches and lagoons, where people can go camping or ride horses, as well as do outings.

The Ña Blanca Country House, by the Tagatija Guazú, is the center attraction, a stream of crystal clear water, with small waterfalls, where tourists can go swimming and camping.

JM Ranch features a riverfront beach and facilities for camping and fishing.

Alto Biobio is one of the most scenic places and is right by the River Biobio.
