= Concepción, Paraguay =

Concepción
- City and district

- Flag Coat of arms

- Location within Paraguay
- Coordinates: 23°24′0″S 57°25′48″W
- Country: Paraguay
- Department: Concepción
- Established: 1773 by Agustín Fernando de Pinedo

Government
  - Intendente municipal: Luis Herminio Acosta Paniagua (PLRA)

Area
  - Total: 8,490 km^{2} (3,280 sq mi)
- Elevation: 44 m (144 ft)

Population (2008)
  - Total: 76,378
  - Density: 9.00/km^{2} (23.3/sq mi)
- Time zone: UTC-03 (PYT)
- Area code: 8700
- Climate: Aw

Concepción (Spanish pronunciation: [konseβˈsjon]) is a city and district in northern Paraguay and capital of the Concepción Department. It is situated next to the Paraguay River.

Founded in 1773 by Governor Agustín Fernando de Pinedo, the town prospered in the early years of the 20th century as a river port and a center for the north of the country, exploiting the new wealth of the Gran Chaco. The town also played an important role in the Paraguayan Civil War of 1947. The city is the seat of the Roman Catholic Diocese of Concepción en Paraguay.

== Transportation ==
National Route 5 (in Spanish, Ruta Nacional Número 5 "Gral. Bernardino Caballero") connects the city with Pedro Juan Caballero and Asunción.

== Climate ==
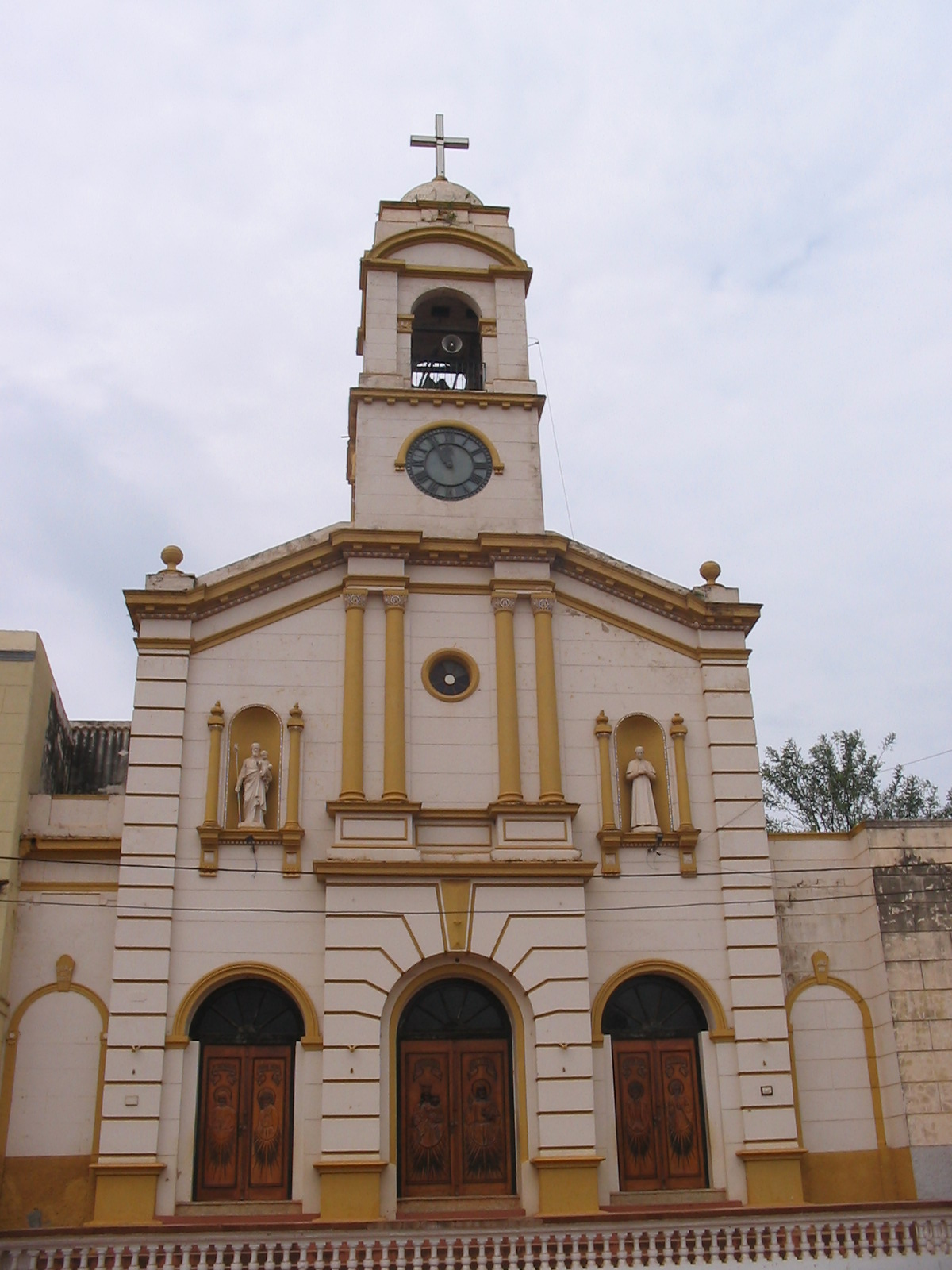
Main Catholic chapel in Concepción

Concepción is located in very close proximity to the Tropic of Capricorn, with the latitudinal line lying just south of the city. The city has a tropical savanna climate (Köppen: Aw) with abundant annual precipitation, although possessing a highly prominent summer peak. Summers are very hot, rainy, and often oppressively humid. Severe thunderstorms are very common in the summer and have the capability to dump copious amounts of rainfall in a short period of time, along with destructively high winds and occasional hail. Winter is much drier and considerably cooler, with near drought-like conditions often prevailing.

Climate data for Concepción (1991–2020, extremes 1937–present)
Month	Jan	Feb	Mar	Apr	May	Jun	Jul	Aug	Sep	Oct	Nov	Dec	Year
Record high °C (°F)	43.0 (109.4)	41.0 (105.8)	41.6 (106.9)	38.2 (100.8)	36.5 (97.7)	36.4 (97.5)	36.2 (97.2)	40.0 (104.0)	42.4 (108.3)	43.4 (110.1)	43.5 (110.3)	41.4 (106.5)	43.5 (110.3)
Mean daily maximum °C (°F)	34.6 (94.3)	33.7 (92.7)	33.0 (91.4)	30.7 (87.3)	26.6 (79.9)	25.6 (78.1)	25.6 (78.1)	28.5 (83.3)	30.5 (86.9)	32.1 (89.8)	32.4 (90.3)	33.7 (92.7)	30.6 (87.1)
Daily mean °C (°F)	28.0 (82.4)	27.2 (81.0)	26.3 (79.3)	23.9 (75.0)	20.2 (68.4)	19.2 (66.6)	18.4 (65.1)	20.4 (68.7)	22.7 (72.9)	25.3 (77.5)	25.8 (78.4)	27.4 (81.3)	23.7 (74.7)
Mean daily minimum °C (°F)	23.3 (73.9)	22.8 (73.0)	21.7 (71.1)	19.2 (66.6)	15.7 (60.3)	14.7 (58.5)	13.2 (55.8)	14.5 (58.1)	17.0 (62.6)	20.3 (68.5)	20.7 (69.3)	22.6 (72.7)	18.8 (65.8)
Record low °C (°F)	12.5 (54.5)	12.0 (53.6)	8.0 (46.4)	5.3 (41.5)	1.5 (34.7)	0.0 (32.0)	−1.5 (29.3)	−2.8 (27.0)	1.8 (35.2)	5.7 (42.3)	9.5 (49.1)	11.4 (52.5)	−2.8 (27.0)
Average precipitation mm (inches)	158.9 (6.26)	152.9 (6.02)	129.6 (5.10)	142.2 (5.60)	113.7 (4.48)	68.6 (2.70)	37.7 (1.48)	28.9 (1.14)	76.3 (3.00)	138.2 (5.44)	200.0 (7.87)	163.0 (6.42)	1,409.8 (55.50)
Average precipitation days (≥ 0.1 mm)	10	9	8	7	7	7	5	6	7	8	8	10	92
Average relative humidity (%)	69	73	74	76	77	77	72	70	68	67	67	70	72
Mean monthly sunshine hours	224	213	217	184	182	152	183	156	173	208	222	222	2,336
Source 1: NOAA (July, November, and December record highs, and March, April and October record lows) (precipitation days, humidity 1961-1990)
Source 2: Deutscher Wetterdienst (sun) Ogimet (Note: Station ID for Concepción is 86134 Use this station ID to locate the sunshine duration) Meteo Climat (record highs and lows)

== Consular representation ==
Brazil has a Vice-consulate in Concepción.

== See also ==
- Concepción massacre

== Sources ==
- World Gazeteer: Paraguay – World-Gazetteer.com
