= Instituto de Previsión Social =

Paraguayan social security institution

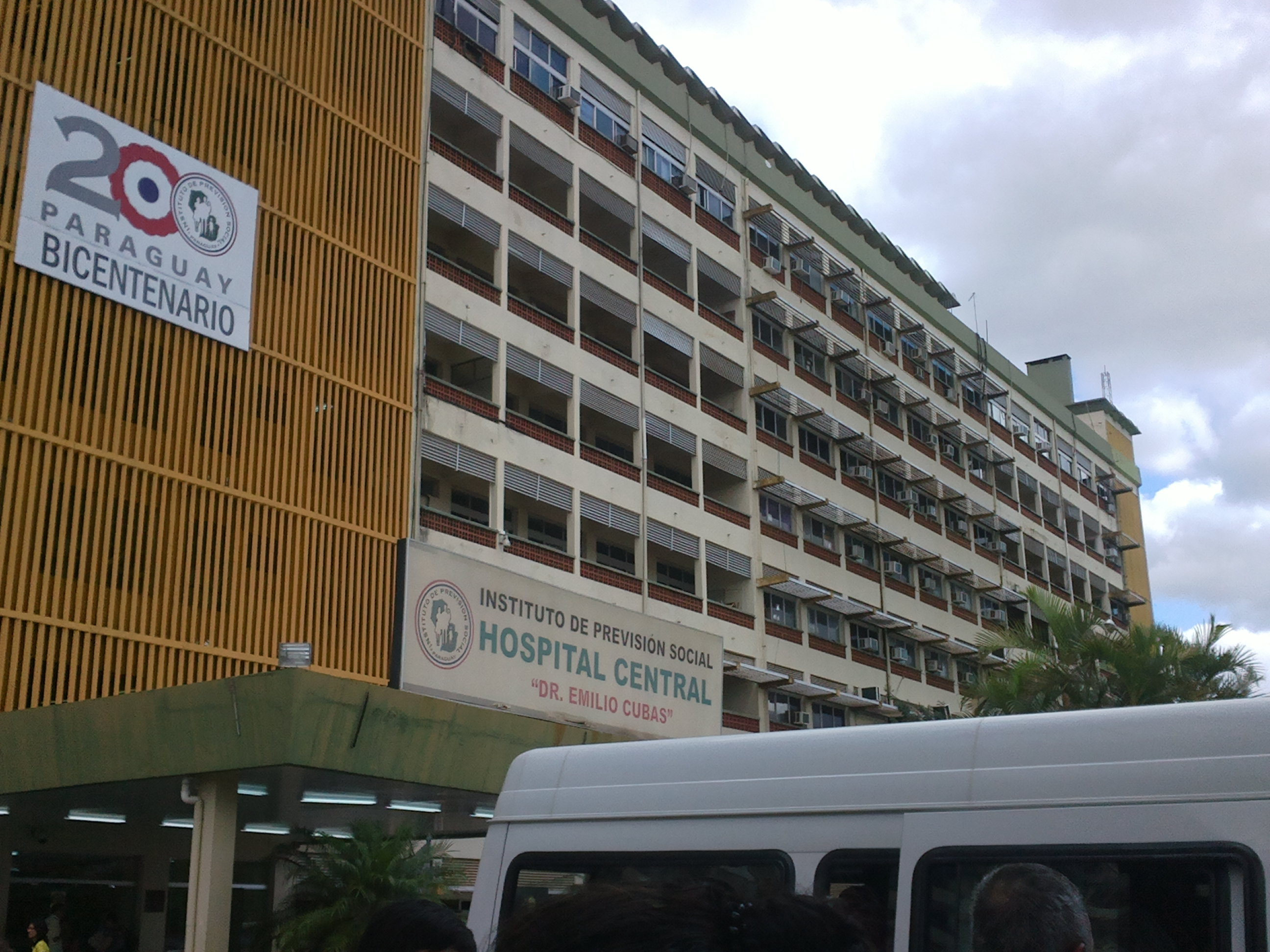
- Hospital Central Dr. Emilio Cubas, IPS in Asunción

Agency overview
- Formed: February 18, 1943
- Jurisdiction: Paraguay
- Headquarters: Asunción
- Agency executive: Abg. Benigno María López Benítez, President of the Institute and the Board of Directors
- Parent agency: Presidency of Paraguay
- Website: Official website

The Instituto de Previsión Social or IPS is the institution responsible for managing the social security system in Paraguay. It was created by Decree-Law No. 17071 on February 18, 1943, during the government of Higinio Morínigo. Later, Decree-Law No. 1860 was enacted on December 1, 1960, modifying the original decree and expanding its services for insured individuals. Its first president was the then Minister of Public Health and Social Welfare, Gerardo Buongermini, who served from 1943 to 1946.

It was established with the purpose of protecting the health of salaried workers in Paraguay, considering that "it is the duty of the state to ensure that citizens have the means to safeguard themselves from the uncertainties of life regarding illness, maternity, disability, work-related accidents, etc."

The objective of social security is to protect individuals from risks that deprive them of their earning capacity, regardless of their origin: unemployment, maternity, illness, disability, and old age. It may also extend coverage to certain family members of the worker in the event of their death, including healthcare assistance.

The National Constitution establishes that "the mandatory and comprehensive social security system for dependent workers and their families shall be established by law, and its extension to all sectors of the population shall be promoted."

The Social Security Institute is a member of the Inter-American Conference on Social Security, a specialized international technical organization that aims to promote the development of social protection and security in the Americas.
