= Paraguay =

Country in South America

Republic of Paraguay: República del Paraguay (Spanish); Paraguái Tavakuairetã (Guarani)
- Flag (Note: The reverse side of the Flag of Paraguay:) Seal (Note: The reverse side of the National Seal of Paraguay:)
- Motto: Paz y justicia (Spanish); Py'aguapy ha tekojoja (Guarani) "Peace and justice"
- Anthem: Himno Nacional Paraguayo (Spanish); Tetã Paraguái Momorãhéi (Guarani) "Paraguayan National Anthem"
- Location of Paraguay (dark green) in South America (gray)
- Capital and largest city: Asunción; 25°16′S 57°40′W
- Official languages: Spanish; Guarani
- Religion (2020): 95.5% Christianity; 87.4% Catholicism; 8.1% other Christian; 4.1% no religion; 0.4% other
- Demonym: Paraguayan
- Government: Unitary presidential republic
  - President: Pedro Alliana
  - Vice President: Antonio Barrios
  - President of the Senate: Basilio Núñez
  - President of the Chamber of Deputies: Raúl Latorre
  - President of the Supreme Court: César Diesel
- Legislature: Congress
  - Upper house: Senate
  - Lower house: Chamber of Deputies

Independence from Spain
  - Declared: 14 May 1811
  - Recognized: 25 November 1842
  - Current constitution: 20 June 1992

Area
  - Total: 406,752 km^{2} (157,048 sq mi) (59th)
  - Water (%): 2.6

Population
  - 2026 estimate: ▲6,460,159 (113th)
  - 2022 census: 6,109,903
  - Density: 15.1/km^{2} (39.1/sq mi) (223rd)
- GDP (PPP): 2026 estimate
  - Total: ▲$152.860 billion (92nd)
  - Per capita: ▲$23,662 (86th)
- GDP (nominal): 2026 estimate
  - Total: ▲$64.001 billion (92nd)
  - Per capita: ▲$9,907 (92nd)
- Gini (2023): ▼44.4 medium inequality
- HDI (2023): ▲0.756 high (99th)
- Currency: Guaraní (PYG)
- Time zone: UTC–03:00 (PYT)
- Date format: dd/mm/yyyy
- Calling code: +595
- ISO 3166 code: PY
- Internet TLD: .py

Paraguay, (Note: /ˈpærəɡwaɪ/, Spanish pronunciation: [paɾaˈɣwaj]; Guarani: Paraguái) officially the Republic of Paraguay, (Note: Spanish: República del Paraguay; Guarani: Paraguái Tavakuairetã) is a landlocked country located in the central region of South America. It borders Bolivia to the northwest and north, Brazil to the northeast and east, and Argentina to the southeast, south, and west. Paraguay has access to the Atlantic Ocean via the Paraná–Paraguay Waterway, a system of navigable channels shared by five countries. The country is governed as a unitary presidential republic composed of a capital district and seventeen departments. Its capital and largest city is Asunción. It dates its independence from Spain to 1811.

The indigenous Guaraní had been living in eastern Paraguay for at least a millennium before the arrival of Spanish conquistadores in 1524. The city of Asunción was founded in 1537 as the first capital of the Governorate of the Río de la Plata within the Spanish Empire. During the 17th century, Paraguay was the center of Jesuit missions, where the natives were converted to Christianity and introduced to European culture. After the expulsion of the Jesuits from Spanish territories in 1767, Paraguay increasingly became a peripheral colony.

Following independence from Spain in the early 19th century, Paraguay was ruled by a series of authoritarian governments. This period ended with the disastrous Triple Alliance War (1864–1870), during which the country lost half its prewar population and around 25–33% of its territory. Paraguay prevailed in another major conflict in the twentieth century, the Chaco War with Bolivia (1932–1935). It subsequently came under a succession of military dictators, culminating in the 35-year regime of Alfredo Stroessner. He was overthrown in 1989 by an internal military coup, marking the beginning of Paraguay's current democratic era.

Paraguay is a developing country, ranking 99th in the Human Development Index, with the seventh highest GDP (PPP) per capita in South America. As of 2024, it had one of the fastest growing economies in the Western Hemisphere, driven by beef and soybean exports, manufacturing, and construction. Paraguay is one of the world's leading exporters of hydroelectricity; the Itaipu Dam on the Paraná River border with Brazil is the third-largest hydroelectric dam in the world in terms of produced energy. Paraguay is a founding member of Mercosur, the United Nations, the Organization of American States and the Lima Group. Additionally, the city of Luque, in metropolitan Asunción, is the seat of the South American Football Confederation. Ciudad del Este is Paraguay's second-largest city and hosts many of the country's consulates-general.

The majority of Paraguay's 6 million people are mestizo, and Guarani culture remains widely influential; more than 90% of the population speak various dialects of the Guarani language alongside Spanish, the highest rate of fluency in an indigenous language in Latin America. In a 2014 Positive Experience Index based on global polling data, Paraguay ranked as the "world's happiest place", and in 2024, placed 24th in the progress rankings of the World Happiness Report.

== Etymology ==
The origin of the word "Paraguay" is uncertain. One version postulates that the name is from the Guaraní language paraguá ("feather crown") and y ("water"): thus, paraguaí ("feather crown of waters"). Other versions state that the name derives from the Guaraní name for the Paraguay River, Payaguá-y ("river of the Payaguá people"). Yet another version states that the names comes from the Guaraní words para ("sea") + gua ("originates") + y ("river"): thus, "sea which originates from the river".

== History ==
=== Pre-colonial era ===
The indigenous Guaraní had been living in eastern Paraguay for at least a millennium before the arrival of the Spanish. Western Paraguay, the Gran Chaco, was inhabited by nomads of whom the Guaycuru peoples were the most prominent. The Paraguay River was roughly the dividing line between the agricultural Guarani people to the east and the nomadic and seminomadic people to the west in the Gran Chaco. The Mbayá nomads were known for their warrior traditions and were not fully pacified until the late 19th century. These indigenous tribes belonged to five distinct language families, which were the bases of their major divisions. Differing language speaking groups were generally competitive over resources and territories. They were further divided into tribes by speaking languages in branches of these families. Today 17 separate ethnolinguistic groups remain.

=== Colonial era ===
The first Europeans in the area were Spanish explorers in 1537. The Spanish explorer Juan de Salazar de Espinosa founded the settlement of Asunción on 15 August 1537. The city eventually became the center of a Spanish colonial province of Paraguay.

An attempt to create an autonomous Christian Indian nation was undertaken by Jesuit missions and settlements in this part of South America in the eighteenth century. They developed Jesuit reductions to bring Guarani populations together at Spanish missions and protect them from virtual slavery by Spanish settlers and Portuguese slave raiders, the bandeirantes, in addition to seeking their conversion to Christianity. Catholicism in Paraguay was influenced by the indigenous peoples: The syncretic religion has absorbed native elements. The reducciones flourished in eastern Paraguay for about 150 years, until the expulsion of the Jesuits by the Spanish Crown in 1767. The Jesuits were suppressed partially due to accusations by various European royal houses of prioritizing poor natives over Imperial interests. The ruins of two 18th century Jesuit Missions of La Santísima Trinidad de Paraná and Jesús de Tavarangue have been designated as World Heritage Sites by UNESCO.

In western Paraguay, Spanish settlement and Christianity were strongly resisted by the nomadic Guaycuru and other nomads from the 16th century onward. Most of these peoples were absorbed into the mestizo population in the 18th and 19th centuries.

=== Independence and rule of Rodríguez de Francia ===
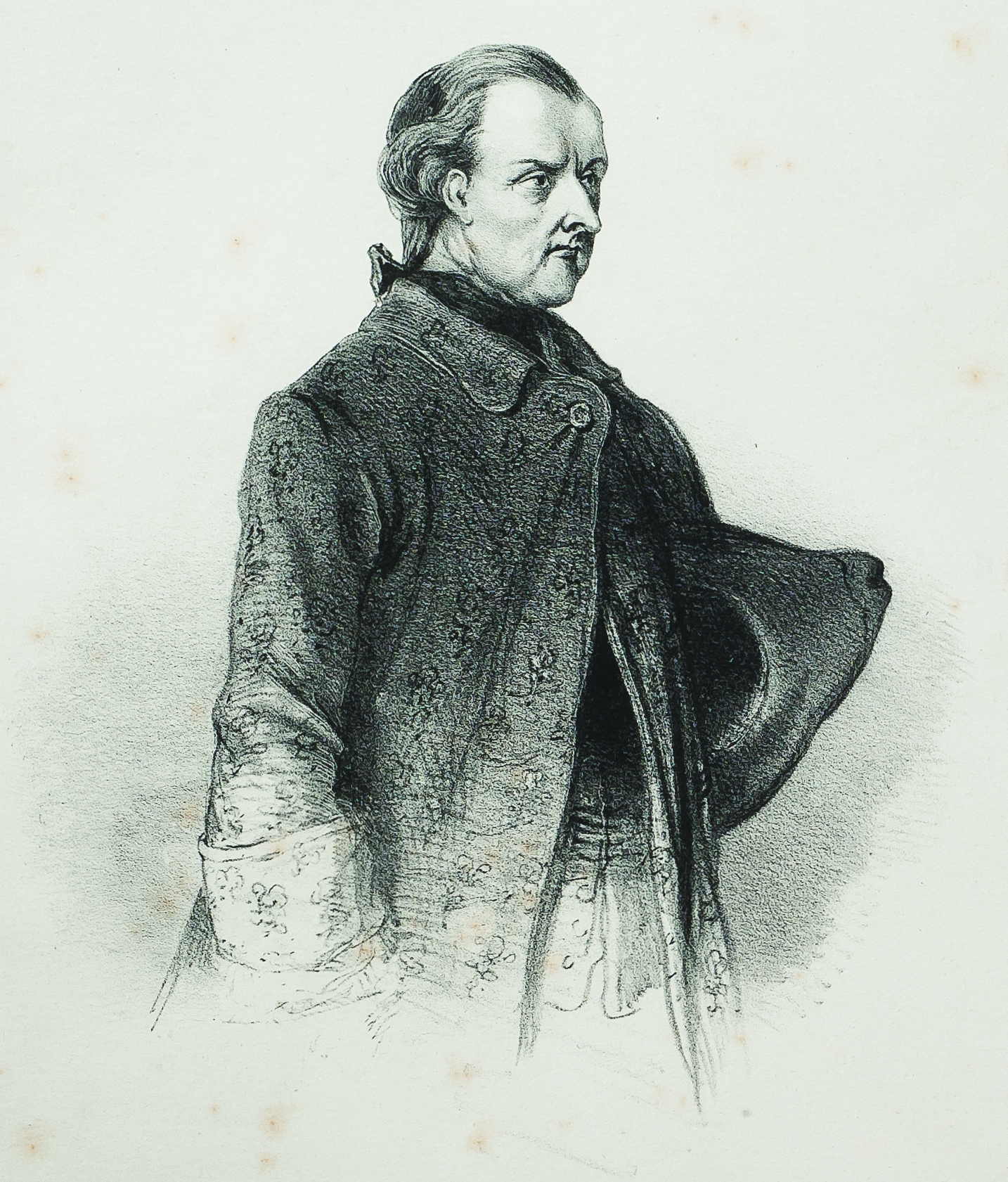
José Gaspar Rodríguez de Francia, Paraguay's first dictator

Paraguay overthrew the local Spanish administration on 14 May 1811. Paraguay's first dictator was José Gaspar Rodríguez de Francia, who ruled Paraguay from 1814 until his death in 1840 with very little outside contact or influence. He intended to create a utopian society based on the Genevan theorist Jean-Jacques Rousseau's Social Contract. Rodríguez de Francia was nicknamed El Supremo.

Rodríguez de Francia established new laws that greatly reduced the powers of the Catholic church (Catholicism was then an established state religion) and the cabinet, forbade colonial citizens from marrying one another and allowed them to marry only blacks, mulattoes or natives, in order to break the power of colonial-era elites and to create a mixed-race or mestizo society. He cut off relations between Paraguay and the rest of South America. Because of Francia's restrictions of freedom, Fulgencio Yegros and several other Independence-era leaders in 1820 planned a coup d'état against Francia, who discovered the plot and had its leaders either executed or imprisoned for life.

=== Rule of the López family ===
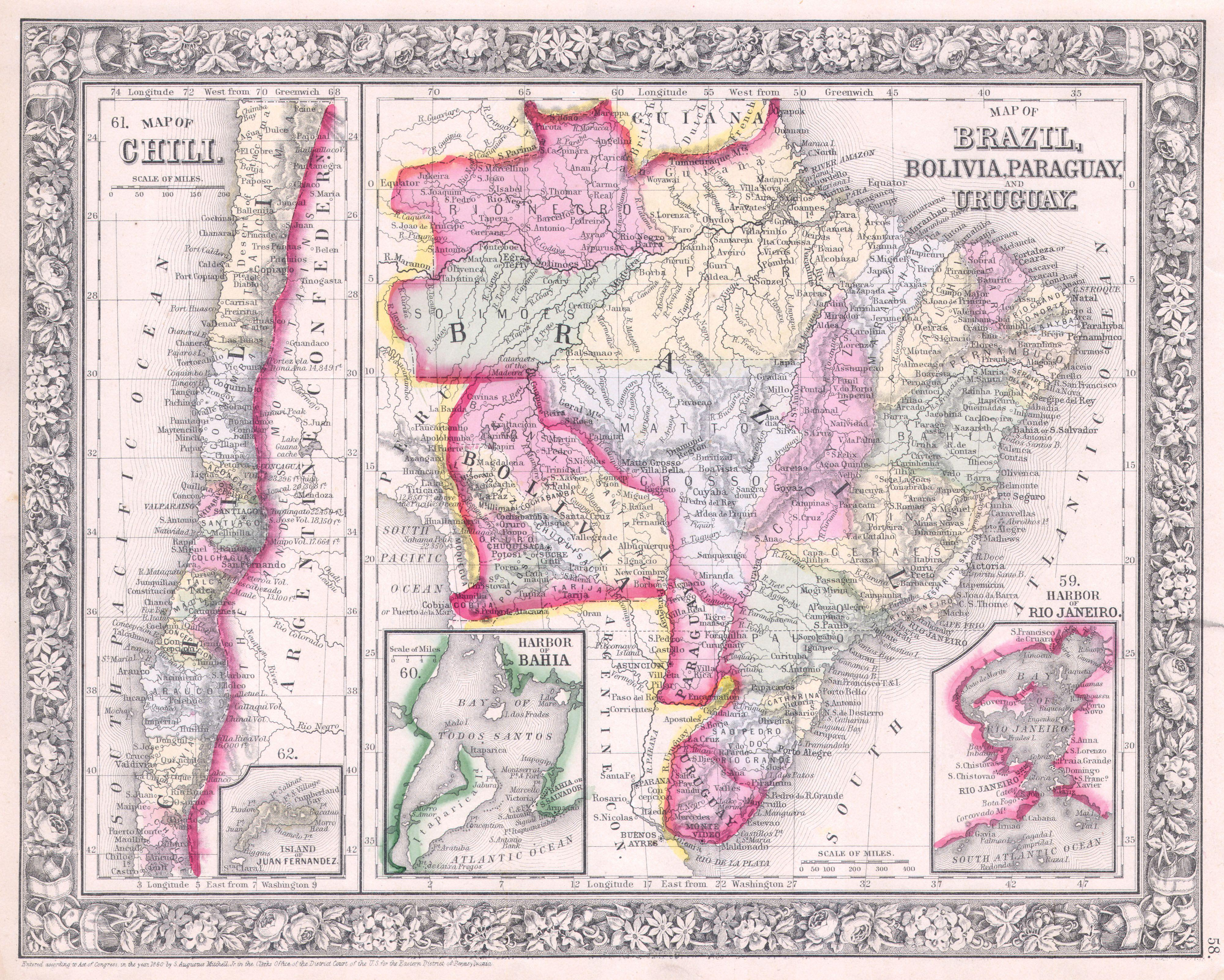
Political map of the region, 1864

After Francia's death in 1840, Paraguay was ruled by various military officers under a new junta militar, until Carlos Antonio López (allegedly Rodríguez de Francia's nephew) came to power in 1841. López modernized Paraguay and opened it to foreign commerce. He signed a nonaggression pact with Argentina and officially declared independence of Paraguay in 1842. After López's death in 1862, power was transferred to his eldest son, Francisco Solano López.

The regime of the López family was characterized by pervasive and rigid centralism in production and distribution. There was no distinction between the public and the private spheres, and the López family ruled the country as it would a large estate.

The government exerted control on all exports. The export of yerba mate and valuable wood products maintained the balance of trade between Paraguay and the outside world. The Paraguayan government was extremely protectionist, never accepted loans from abroad and levied high tariffs against imported foreign products. This protectionism made the society self-sufficient, and it also avoided the debt suffered by Argentina and Brazil. Slavery existed in Paraguay, although not in great numbers, until 1844, when it was legally abolished in the new constitution.

Francisco Solano López, the son of Carlos Antonio López, replaced his father as the President-Dictator in 1862, and generally continued the political policies of his father. Both wanted to give an international image of Paraguay as "democratic and republican", but in fact, the ruling family had almost total control of all public life in the country, including church and colleges.

Militarily, Carlos Antonio López modernized and expanded industry and the Paraguayan Army and greatly strengthened the strategic defenses of Paraguay by developing the Fortress of Humaitá. The government hired more than 200 foreign technicians, who installed telegraph lines and railroads to aid the expanding steel, textile, paper and ink, naval construction, weapons and gunpowder industries. The Ybycuí foundry, completed in 1850, manufactured cannons, mortars and bullets of all calibers. River warships were built in the shipyards of Asunción. Fortifications were built, especially along the Apa River and in Gran Chaco. Following the death of Carlos Antonio López, these projects continued under his son Francisco Solano.

In terms of socio-economic development, the country was dubbed "the most advanced Republic in South America", notably by the British judge and politician Sir Robert Phillimore.

According to George Thompson, Lieutenant Colonel of Engineers in the Paraguayan Army prior to and during the war, López's government was comparatively a good one for Paraguay:

Probably in no other country in the world has life and property been so secure as all over Paraguay during his (Antonio Lopez's) reign. Crime was almost unknown, and when committed, immediately detected and punished. The mass of the people was, perhaps, the happiest in existence. They had hardly to do any work to gain a livelihood. Each family had its house or hut in its own ground. They planted, in a few days, enough tobacco, maize and mandioca for their own consumption [...]. Having at every hut a grove of oranges [...] and also a few cows, they were almost throughout the year under little necessity [...]. The higher classes, of course, lived more in the European way...

— George Thompson, C.E.

=== Paraguayan War (1864–1870) ===
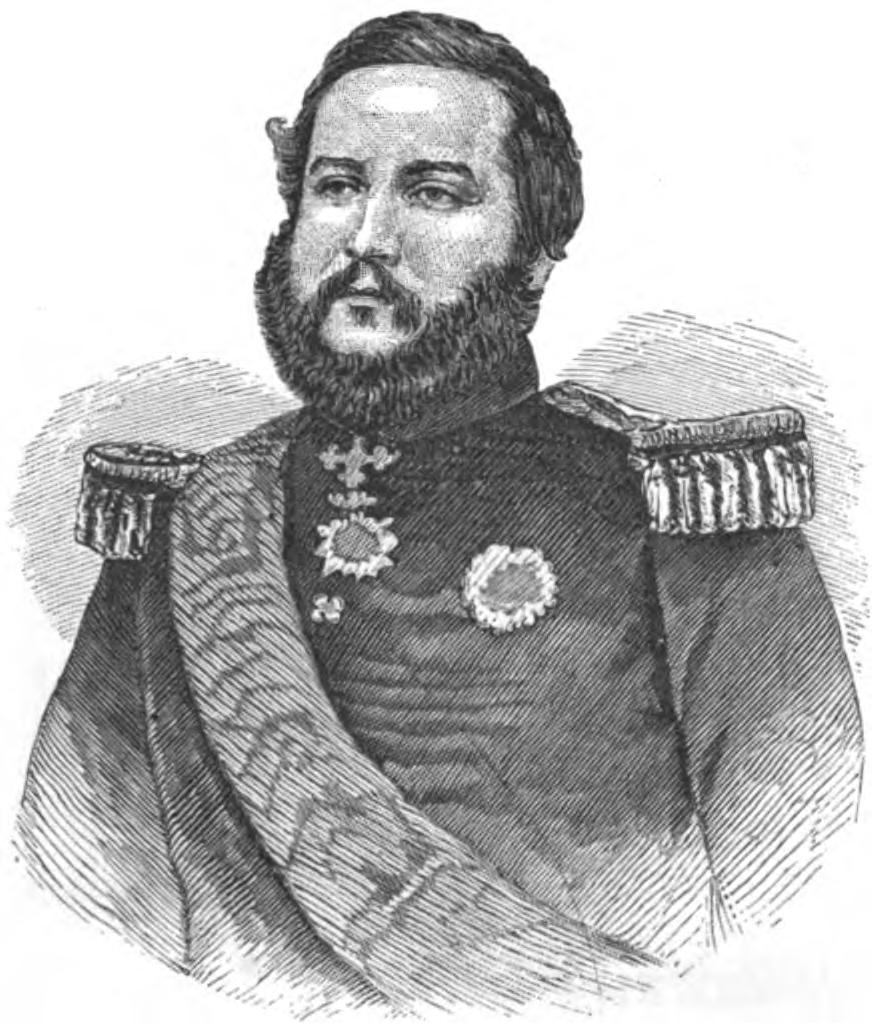
Francisco Solano López

On 12 October 1864, despite Paraguayan ultimatums, Brazil (allied with the Argentine Government under General Bartolomé Mitre and the rebellious Uruguayan colorados led by Gen. Venancio Flores) invaded the Republic of Uruguay in order to overthrow the government of that time (which was under the rule of the Blanco Party, an ally of López), (Note: The Blanco Party of Uruguay, hardline right wing and reactionary in those days, headed the Uruguayan government at the outbreak of the war and were allies of the Paraguayan government.) (Note: British explorer and diplomat Richard Francis Burton, a witness to the conflict, marks this date (12–16 October 1864) as the real beginning of the war. He wrote: The Brazilian Army invades the Banda Oriental, despite the protestations of President López, who declared that such invasion would be held a "casus belli".) The Paraguayans, in turn, led by the Marshal of the Republic Francisco Solano López, attacked Mato Grosso on 15 December 1864 and later declared war against Argentina on 23 March 1865. The Blanco Government was toppled and replaced by a Colorado government under General Venancio Flores on 22 February 1865. Afterward, the Argentine Republic, the Empire of Brazil and the Republic of Uruguay signed the secret Treaty of the Triple Alliance against the Paraguayan Government on 1 May 1865.

After a brief offensive in Argentine and Brazilian territory, the Paraguayans retreated to national territory where they put up a ferocious resistance. With the capture of Asunción, the Triple Alliance installed a provisional government. On 22 July 1869 the National Assembly elected the National Junta formed by Carlos Loizaga, Juan Francisco Decoud and Cirilo Antonio Rivarola. However, Solano López evaded capture and was leading a guerrilla campaign. The war ultimately ended with his death in 1870 in the Battle of Cerro Corá, where he refused to surrender and died in action. The real causes of this war, which remains the bloodiest international conflict in the history of The Americas, are still highly debatable. (Note: The classical view asserts that Francisco Solano López's expansionist and hegemonic views are the main reason for the outbreak of the conflict. The traditional Paraguayan view, held by the "lopistas" (supporters of Solano López in Paraguay and elsewhere), holds that Paraguay acted in self-defense and for the protection of the equilibrium of the Plate Basin. This view is usually contested by the "anti-lopistas" (known in Paraguay as "legionarios"), who favored the "Triple Alliance". Revisionist views from right and left national populists put a great emphasis on the influence of the British Empire, a view that a majority of historians reject.)

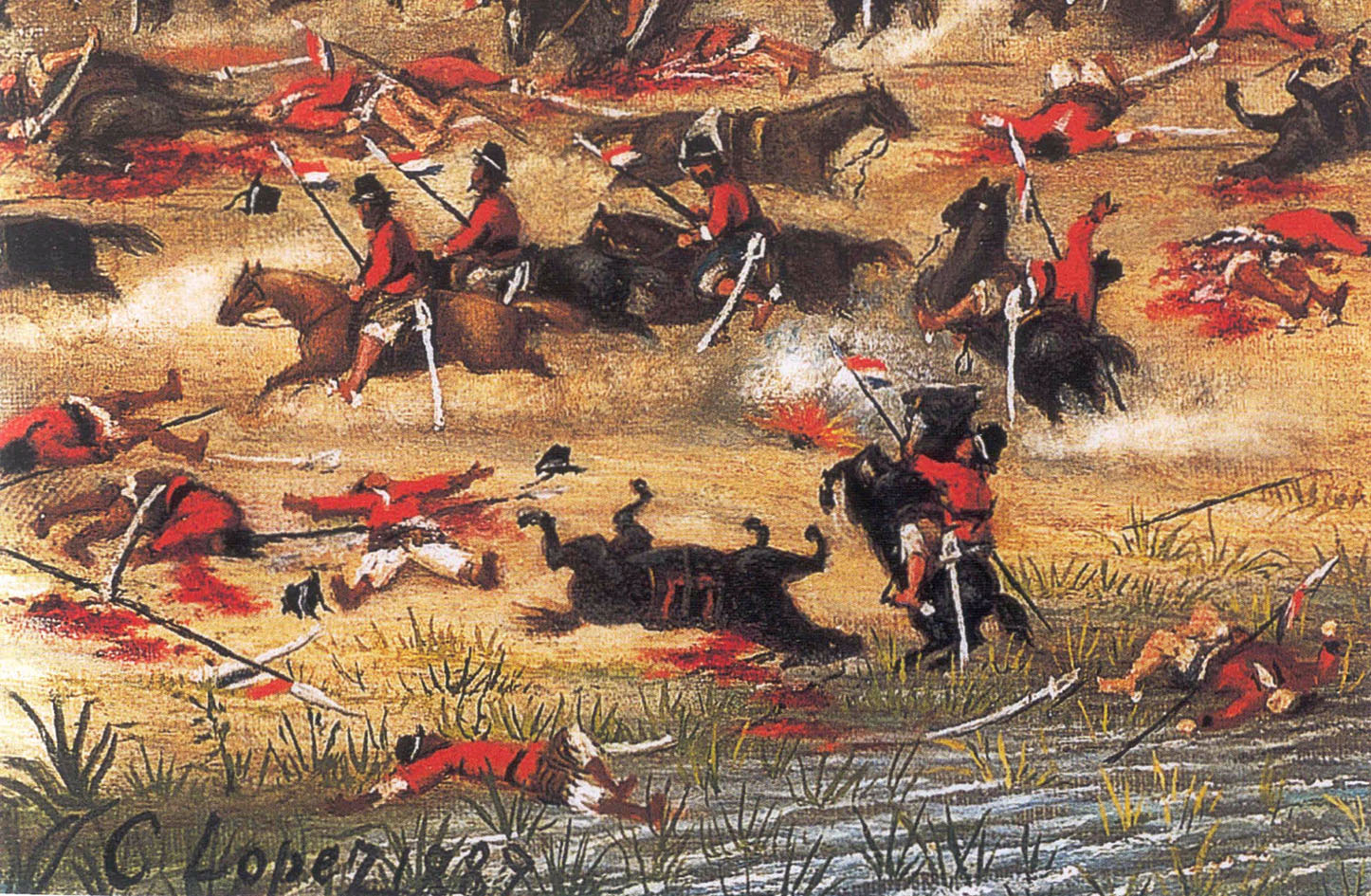
The Battle of Tuyutí, May 1866

Paraguay lost 25–33% of its territory to Argentina and Brazil, paid an enormous war debt, and sold large amounts of national properties to stabilize its internal budget. The worst consequence of the war was the catastrophic loss of population. At least 50% of Paraguayans died during the conflict, numbers to which it took many decades for the country to return. Of the disaster suffered by the Paraguayans at the outcome of the war, William D. Rubinstein wrote:

"The normal estimate is that of a Paraguayan population of somewhere between 450,000 and 900,000, only 220,000 survived the war, of whom only 28,000 were adult males."

During the Sacking of Asunción in 1869, the Imperial Brazilian Army packed up and transported the Paraguayan National Archives to Rio de Janeiro. (Note: Some of the documents taken by Brasil during the war, were returned to Paraguay in the collection known as "Colección de Río Branco", nowadays in the National Archives of Asunción, Paraguay.) Brazil's records from the war have remained classified. This has made Paraguayan history in the colonial and early national periods difficult to research and study.

=== 20th century ===
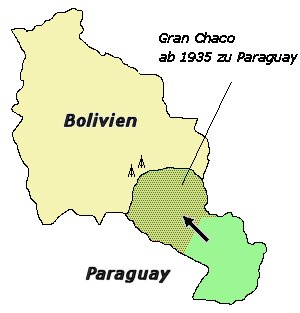
Gran Chaco was the site of the Chaco War (1932–35), in which Bolivia lost most of the disputed territory to Paraguay

In 1904, the Liberal revolution against the rule of Colorados broke out. The Liberal rule started a period of great political instability. Between 1904 and 1954, Paraguay had thirty-one presidents, most of whom were removed from office by force. Conflicts between the factions of the ruling Liberal party led to the Paraguayan Civil War of 1922–1923.

The unresolved border conflict with Bolivia over the Chaco region finally erupted in the early 1930s in the Chaco War. After both sides suffered great losses, Paraguay defeated Bolivia and established its sovereignty over most of the disputed Chaco region. After the war, military officers used popular dissatisfaction with the Liberal politicians to seize the power for themselves. On 17 February 1936, the February Revolution brought colonel Rafael Franco to power. Between 1940 and 1948, the country was ruled by general Higinio Morínigo. Dissatisfaction with his rule resulted in the Paraguayan Civil War of 1947. In its aftermath Alfredo Stroessner began involvement in a string of plots, which resulted in his military coup d'état of 4 May 1954.

=== Stroessner era, 1954–1989 ===
A series of unstable governments ensued until the establishment in 1954 of the regime of dictator Alfredo Stroessner, who remained in office for more than three decades until 1989. Paraguay was modernized to some extent under Stroessner's regime, although his rule was marked by extensive human rights abuses.

Stroessner and the Colorado party ruled the country from 1954 to 1989. The dictator oversaw an era of economic expansion, but also had a poor human rights and environmental record. Paraguay actively participated in Operation Condor. The use of political repression, threats and death squads was a key factor in Stroessner's longevity as dictator of Paraguay. He maintained virtually unlimited power by giving a free hand to the military and to Minister of Interior Edgar Ynsfrán, who began to harass, terrorize, and murder family members of the regime's opponents. Stroessner heavily relied on various Colorado Party militias, subordinated to his control, to crush any dissent within the country. Furthermore, Stroessner's Paraguay became a haven for Nazi war criminals, including Josef Mengele, Hans-Ulrich Rudel, and Eduard Roschmann. Given Stroessner's affinity for Nazism and harboring of Nazi war criminals, foreign press often referred to his government as the "poor man's Nazi regime".

The Stroessner regime's strong anti-communist stance earned it the support of the United States, with which it enjoyed close military and economic ties. Paraguay was a leading participant in Operation Condor, a campaign of state terror and security operations officially implemented in 1975 which were jointly conducted by the military dictatorships of six South American countries (Chile, Argentina, Bolivia, Paraguay, Uruguay and Brazil) with the support of the United States. Under Stroessner, egregious human rights violations were committed against the indigenous Aché population of Paraguay's eastern districts, largely as the result of US and European corporations wanting access to the country's forests, mines, and grazing lands. The Aché resided on land that was coveted and had resisted relocation attempts by the Paraguayan army. The government retaliated with massacres and forced many Aché into slavery. In 1974, the UN accused Paraguay of slavery and genocide. Only a few hundred Aché remained alive by the late 1970s. The Stroessner regime financed this genocide with US aid.

The splits in the Colorado Party in the 1980s, and the prevailing conditions – Stroessner's advanced age, the character of the regime, the economic downturn, and international isolation – were catalysts for anti-regime demonstrations and statements by the opposition prior to the 1988 general elections. The Stroessner regime relented in April 1987, and permitted opposition figure Domingo Laíno to return to Asunción. Laíno took the lead in organizing demonstrations and reducing infighting among the opposition party. The opposition was unable to reach agreement on a common strategy regarding the elections, with some parties advocating abstention, and others calling for blank voting. The parties held numerous 'lightning demonstrations' (mítines relámpagos), especially in rural areas. Such demonstrations were gathered and quickly disbanded before the arrival of the police. In response to the upsurge in opposition activities, Stroessner condemned the Accord for advocating "sabotage of the general elections and disrespect of the law". He used national police and civilian vigilantes of the Colorado Party to break up demonstrations. A number of opposition leaders were imprisoned or otherwise harassed. Hermes Rafael Saguier, another key leader of the PLRA, was imprisoned for four months in 1987 on charges of sedition. In early February 1988, police arrested 200 people attending a National Coordinating Committee meeting in Coronel Oviedo. Laíno and several other opposition figures were arrested before dawn on the day of the election, 14 February, and held for twelve hours. The government declared Stroessner's reelection with 89% of the vote.

=== Stroessner's overthrow, post-1989 ===
On 3 February 1989, Stroessner was overthrown in a military coup headed by General Andrés Rodríguez. As president, Rodríguez instituted political, legal, and economic reforms and initiated a rapprochement with the international community. Reflecting the deep hunger for land, hundreds of poor rural Paraguayans immediately occupied thousands of acres of unused territories belonging to Stroessner and his associates; by mid-1990, 19,000 families occupied 340,000 acres (138,000 ha). At the time, 2.06 million people lived in rural areas, more than half of the 4.1 million total population, and most were landless.

The June 1992 constitution established a democratic system of government and dramatically improved protection of fundamental human rights. In May 1993, Colorado Party candidate Juan Carlos Wasmosy was elected as Paraguay's first civilian president in almost forty years, in what international observers deemed free and fair elections.

With support from the United States, the Organization of American States, and other countries in the region, the Paraguayan people rejected an April 1996 attempt by then Army Chief General Lino Oviedo to oust President Wasmosy.

Oviedo was nominated as the Colorado candidate for president in the 1998 election. However, when the Supreme Court upheld in April his conviction on charges related to the 1996 coup attempt, he was not allowed to run and was detained in jail. His former running mate, Raúl Cubas, became the Colorado Party's candidate, and was elected in May in elections deemed by international observers to be free and fair. One of Cubas' first acts after taking office in August was to commute Oviedo's sentence and release him. In December 1998, Paraguay's Supreme Court declared these actions unconstitutional. In this tense atmosphere, the murder of Vice President and long-time Oviedo rival Luis María Argaña on 23 March 1999, led the Chamber of Deputies to impeach Cubas the next day. On 26 March, eight student anti-government demonstrators were murdered, widely believed to have been carried out by Oviedo supporters. This increased opposition to Cubas, who resigned on 28 March. Senate President Luis González Macchi, a Cubas opponent, was peacefully sworn in as president the same day.

In 2003, Nicanor Duarte was elected as president.

=== Election of Fernando Lugo ===
For the 2008 general elections, the Colorado Party was favored in polls. Their candidate was Minister of Education Blanca Ovelar, the first woman to be nominated as a candidate for a major party in Paraguayan history. After sixty years of Colorado rule, voters chose Fernando Lugo, a former Roman Catholic Bishop and not a professional politician in civil government, and a member of the Authentic Radical Liberal Party, Paraguay's largest opposition party. Lugo was an adherent of liberation theology. Lugo achieved a historic victory in Paraguay's presidential election, defeating the ruling party candidate, and ending 61 years of conservative rule. Lugo won with nearly 41% of the vote, compared to almost 31% for Blanca Ovelar of the Colorado party. Outgoing President Nicanor Duarte Frutos hailed the moment as the first time in the history of the nation that a government had transferred power to opposition forces in a constitutional and peaceful fashion.

Lugo was sworn in on 15 August 2008. The Lugo administration set its two major priorities as the reduction of corruption and economic inequality.

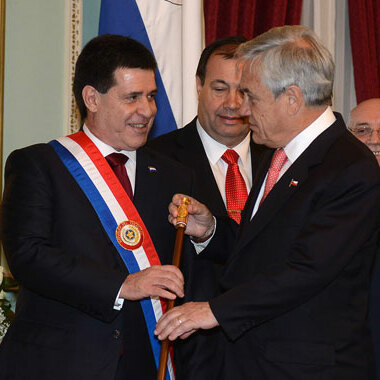
Inauguration of former President Horacio Cartes, 15 August 2013

Political instability following Lugo's election and disputes within his cabinet encouraged some renewal of popular support for the Colorado Party. Reports suggested that the businessman Horacio Cartes became the new political figure amid disputes. Despite the US Drug Enforcement Administration's strong accusations against Cartes related to drug trafficking, he continued to amass followers in the political arena.

On 14 January 2011, the Colorado Party convention nominated Horacio Cartes as the presidential candidate for the party. However, the party's constitution did not allow it. On 21 June 2012, impeachment proceedings against President Lugo began in the country's lower house, which was controlled by his opponents. Lugo was given less than twenty-four hours to prepare for the proceedings and only two hours in which to mount a defense. Impeachment was quickly approved and the resulting trial in Paraguay's Senate, also controlled by the opposition, ended with the removal of Lugo from office and Vice President Federico Franco assuming the duties of president. Lugo's rivals blamed him for the deaths of 17 people – eight police officers and nine farmers – in armed clashes after police were ambushed by armed peasants when enforcing an eviction order against rural trespassers.

Lugo's supporters gathered outside Congress to protest the decision as a "politically motivated coup d'état". Lugo's removal from office on 22 June 2012 is considered by UNASUR and other neighboring countries, especially those currently governed by leftist leaders, as a coup d'état. However, the Organization of American States, which sent a mission to Paraguay to gather information, concluded that the impeachment process was not a coup d'état, as it had been carried out in accordance with the Constitution of Paraguay.

=== Present day ===
From August 2013 to 15 August 2018, the President of Paraguay was Horacio Cartes. From 2018 until 2023, the President of Paraguay has been Mario Abdo Benítez. They are both from the conservative Colorado Party. President Mario Abdo enjoyed a close relationship with the Brazilian far-right president (in power 2019–2022), Jair Bolsonaro. In February 2019, President Mario Abdo Benitez was at Bolsonaro's side when Bolsonaro praised Paraguayan military dictator Alfredo Stroessner, calling him "a man of vision". In May 2023, Santiago Peña of the long-ruling Colorado Party, won the presidential election to succeed Mario Abdo as the next President of Paraguay. On 15 August 2023, Santiago Peña was sworn in as Paraguay's new president. On 6 November 2026, Peña was impeached, removed from office, and placed under house arrest because of his alleged role in causing a banking crisis. He had tried to resign first, but lawmakers did not accept it.

== Geography ==
Eastern Paraguay (Paraneña) Western Paraguay (Chaco)

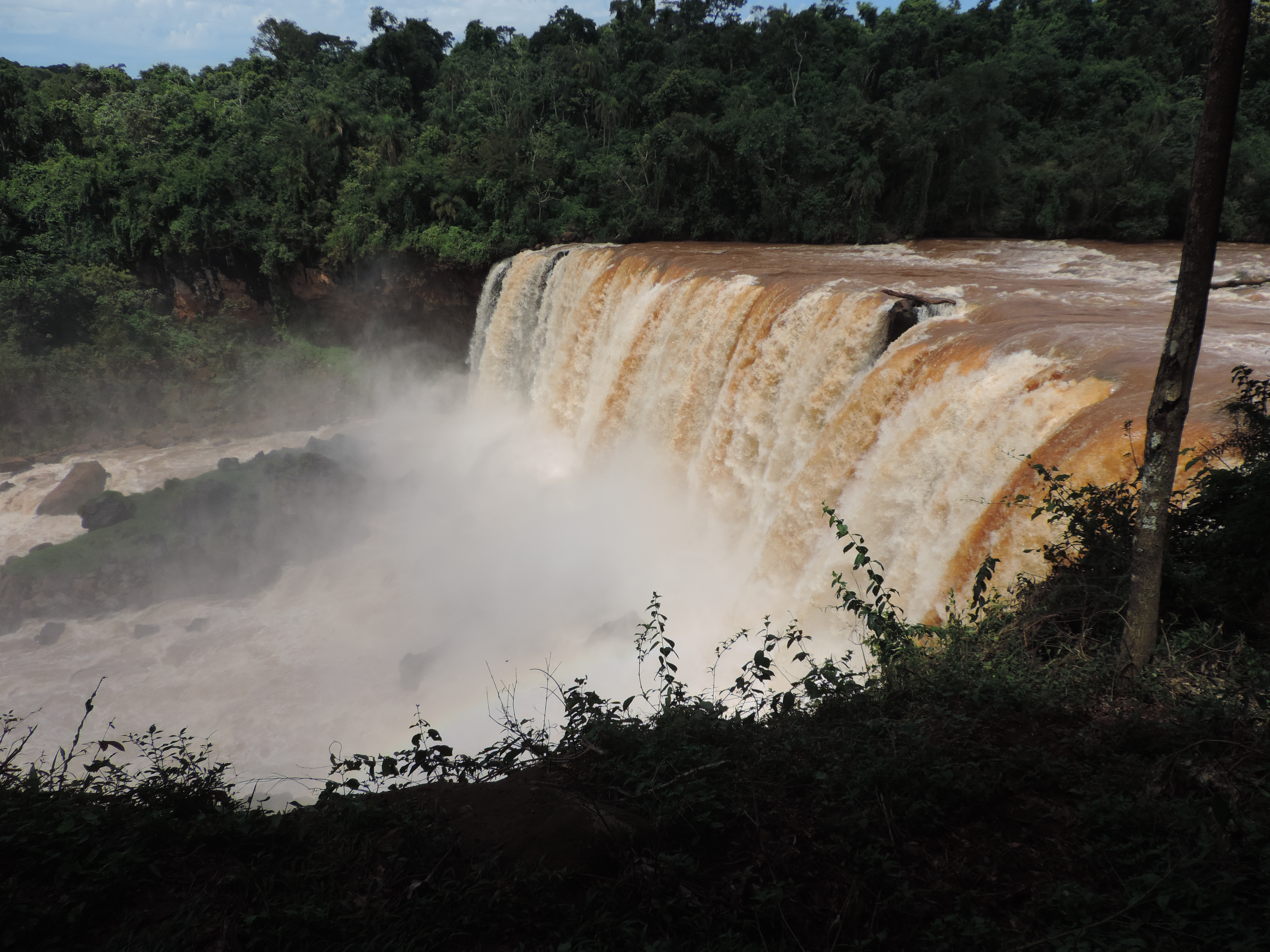
Nacunday National Park, Southern Paraguay

Paraguay is divided by the Río Paraguay into two well differentiated geographic regions. The eastern region (Región Oriental); and the western region, officially called Western Paraguay (Región Occidental) and also known as the Chaco, which is part of the Gran Chaco. The country lies between latitudes 19° and 28°S, and longitudes 54° and 63°W.

The terrain consists mostly of grassy plains and wooded hills in the eastern region. To the west are mostly low, marshy plains. Paraguay contains six terrestrial ecoregions: Alto Paraná Atlantic forests, Chaco, Cerrado, Humid Chaco, Pantanal, and Paraná flooded savanna. It had a 2019 Forest Landscape Integrity Index mean score of 6.39/10, ranking it 74th globally out of 172 countries. The Guarani Aquifer is an important exorheic basin to the region.

With one of the highest rates of deforestation in the world, Paraguay’s tropical forests are seriously threatened. Since the 1960s, nearly 90% of Paraguay’s original forest cover has disappeared, mainly due to the expansion of agricultural and livestock activities. Faced with this situation, many indigenous people are forced to abandon their lands and move to large cities.

Although Paraguay is landlocked, there are a number of noteworthy lakeside beaches.

=== Climate ===
Köppen climate classification

The overall climates are semi-arid, tropical and subtropical. Winds play a major role in influencing Paraguay's weather: between October and March, warm winds blow from the Amazon Basin in the north, while the period between May and August brings cold winds from the Andes.

The absence of mountain ranges to provide a natural barrier allows winds to develop speeds as high as 161 km/h (100 mph). This also leads to significant changes in temperature within a short span of time; between April and September, temperatures will sometimes drop below freezing. January is the hottest summer month, with an average daily temperature of 28.9 degrees Celsius (84 degrees Fahrenheit).

Rainfall varies dramatically across the country, with substantial rainfall in the eastern portions, and semi-arid conditions in the far west. The far eastern forest belt receives an average of 170 centimetres (67 inches) of rain annually, while the western Chaco region typically averages no more than 50 cm (20 in) a year. The rains in the west tend to be irregular and evaporate quickly, contributing to the aridity of the area.

=== Fauna ===
Wildlife in Paraguay include marsh deer, monkeys, armadillos, anteaters, otters, wild boars, tapirs, jaguars, ocelots, bats, and the coypu.

== Government and politics ==
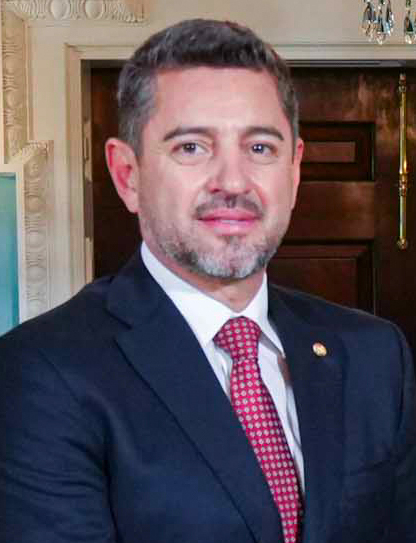
Pedro Alliana
President

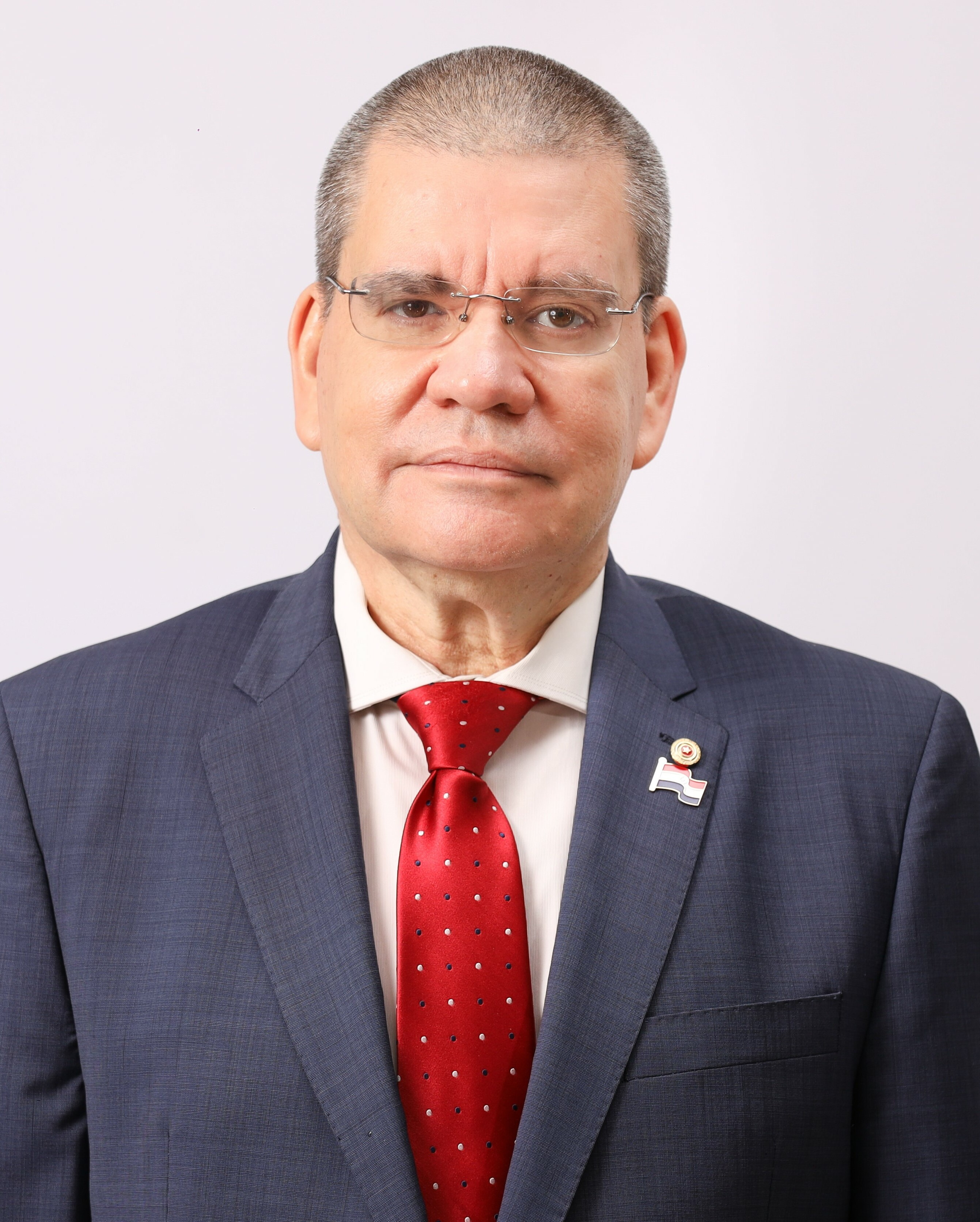
Antonio Barrios
Vice President

Paraguay is a representative democratic republic, with a multi-party system and separation of powers across three branches. Executive power is exercised solely by the President, who is head of state and head of government. Legislative power is vested in the two chambers of the National Congress. The judiciary is vested on tribunals and Courts of Civil Law and a nine-member Supreme Court of Justice, all of them independent of the executive and the legislature.

Since the end of the 1947 civil war, the country's politics have generally been dominated by the conservative Colorado Party.

=== Administrative divisions ===
Paraguay consists of seventeen departments and one capital district (distrito capital).

It is also divided into two regions: The "Occidental Region" or Chaco (Boquerón, Alto Paraguay and Presidente Hayes), and the "Oriental Region" (the other departments and the capital district).

These are the departments, with their capitals, population, area and the number of districts:

ISO 3166-2:PY	Department	Capital	Population (2022 census)	Area (km^{2})	Districts
ASU	Distrito Capital	Asunción	462,241	117	1
1	Concepción	Concepción	206,181	18,057	14
2	San Pedro	San Pedro	355,175	20,007	23
3	Cordillera	Caacupé	268,037	4,953	20
4	Guairá	Villarrica	179,555	3,991	18
5	Caaguazú	Coronel Oviedo	431,519	11,479	22
6	Caazapá	Caazapá	139,479	9,503	11
7	Itapúa	Encarnación	449,642	16,536	30
8	Misiones	San Juan Bautista	111,142	9,568	10
9	Paraguarí	Paraguarí	200,472	8,710	18
10	Alto Paraná	Ciudad del Este	763,702	14,898	22
11	Central	Areguá	1,883,927	2,665	19
12	Ñeembucú	Pilar	76,719	12,155	16
13	Amambay	Pedro Juan Caballero	179,412	12,935	6
14	Canindeyú	Salto del Guairá	191,114	14,677	16
15	Presidente Hayes	Villa Hayes	123,313	72,917	10
16	Alto Paraguay	Fuerte Olimpo	17,195	82,394	4
17	Boquerón	Filadelfia	71,078	91,676	4
–	Paraguay	Asunción	6,109,903	406,796	273

=== Military ===
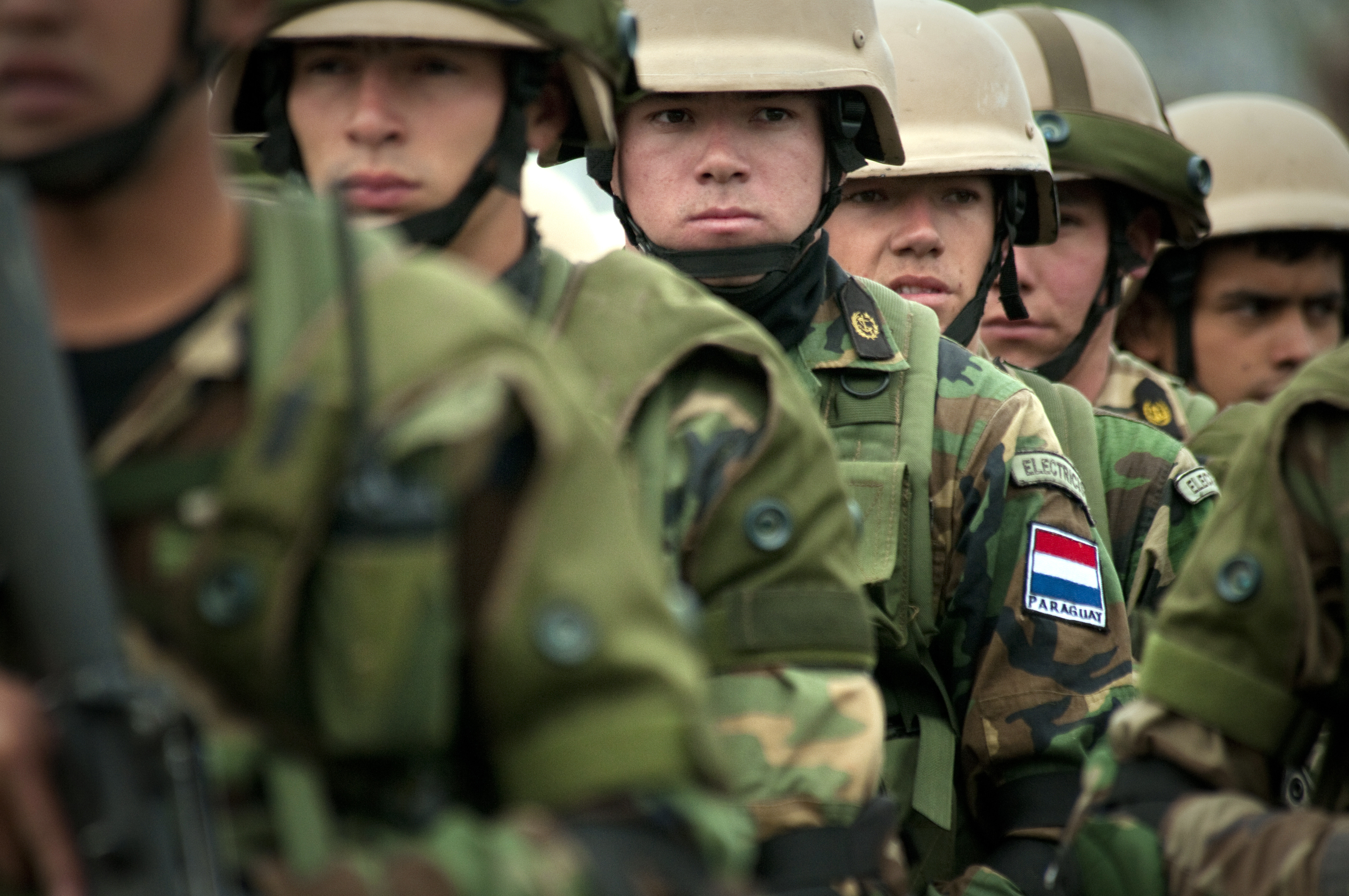
Paraguayan marines at Ancon Marine Base

The military of Paraguay consist of an army, navy (including naval aviation and marine corps) and air force. Paraguay's constitution establishes the president of Paraguay as commander-in-chief of the armed forces.

Paraguay has compulsory military service; all 18-year-old males, as well as 17-year-old males in the year of their 18th birthday, are liable for one year of active duty. The constitution allows for conscientious objection, a right regulated by Law N°4013/2010.

Paraguay has partnered with Argentina, Brazil, and the United States in regional anti-terrorism and anti-narcotics efforts. In July 2005, U.S. special forces began arriving at Paraguay's Mariscal Estigarribia air base to support joint training and humanitarian operations In 2019, Asuncion hosted the first meeting of the Regional Security Mechanism (RSM), which promotes cooperation between Paraguay, Argentina, Brazil, and the U.S. in addressing transnational crime and terrorism in the "triple frontier" region.

Paraguay is the 73rd most peaceful country in the world, according to the 2024 Global Peace Index.

== Economy ==
For many years, the country's image was associated with the illicit trade in electronic products, weapons and drugs. However, this scenario began to change in the 2000s, with the rise of legalized businesses such as the production of soy, maize, beef, among others. Data from the Central Bank of Paraguay (BCP) showed that, in 2006, exports related to the triangulation trade (China-Paraguay-Brazil), treated by Brazil – in most cases – as smuggling and embezzlement, represented 22% of the country's GDP. In 2016, this percentage dropped to 12%. With higher tax collections through legalized employment, the country has been able to improve its infrastructure, which was precarious. Paraguay has an economic development policy based on exports and dependence on the Brazilian market prevails. The triangulation trade has in its essence the export of products originating in China, with Brazil as its main destination. The energy exported is essentially the hydroelectric surplus generated by the Itaipu Power Plant, for which Brazil is the main buyer. And maquilas, whose main investors are Brazilians, also have a large consumer market in Brazil for their products. Therefore, in these three pillars of Paraguay's development strategy, there is the outstanding characteristic of reexports. In the case of agricultural commodities, it is the export of products originating in Paraguay.

In the 2010s, the economy, largely directed towards soybean production, grew by an average of 4%. The economic growth did not, however, reduce poverty, which in 2018, according to official figures, reached more than 26% of the population. According to The New York Times, Paraguay is "one of the Latin American countries where the gap between rich and poor has widened the most in recent years". In the countryside, 85% of agricultural land is owned by 2.6% of the owners. In addition, people of indigenous descent have been expelled to make way for soybean companies.

The soybean export market is largely dominated by multinationals (Cargill, Archer Daniels Midland, Bunge Limited, etc.) and therefore benefits few Paraguayans. Export companies and landowners pay little tax. For example, a study by ECLAC (a UN agency) released in 2018 indicates that Paraguay is one of the countries where companies participate the least in the state budget.

Pesticides and other chemicals are used heavily in soybean fields. The country's environmental standards are not met by companies and agrochemicals contaminate the environment. In 2019, the United Nations Human Rights Committee issued a ruling urging Paraguay to undertake an investigation into the massive fumigation of agrochemicals and the poisoning of the population. However, the situation is not improving: "The high level of political corruption, the extreme fragility of institutions, the high level of social vulnerability, the omnipotence of economic interests in political decisions, as well as the location [of the country] in the geographic heart of the Southern Cone and its abundance of natural resources, make Paraguay an attractive target for imperial geopolitical interests", says sociologist Tomás Palau. Academic José Luis Insfrán also notes that the country's politicians "are subsidized by big business; they are the ones who implement the policies".

In 2005, the International Monetary Fund stated that fewer than 10% of workers in Paraguay participate in the pension system, 95% of which is administered by two institutions. Both are financed on a pay as you go system by worker contributions; the first, Instituto de Previsión Social is for private sector employees, and the caja fiscal for public employees (including university professors, teachers, judicial employees, army officers and police officers) and veterans of the Chaco War (or their descendants).

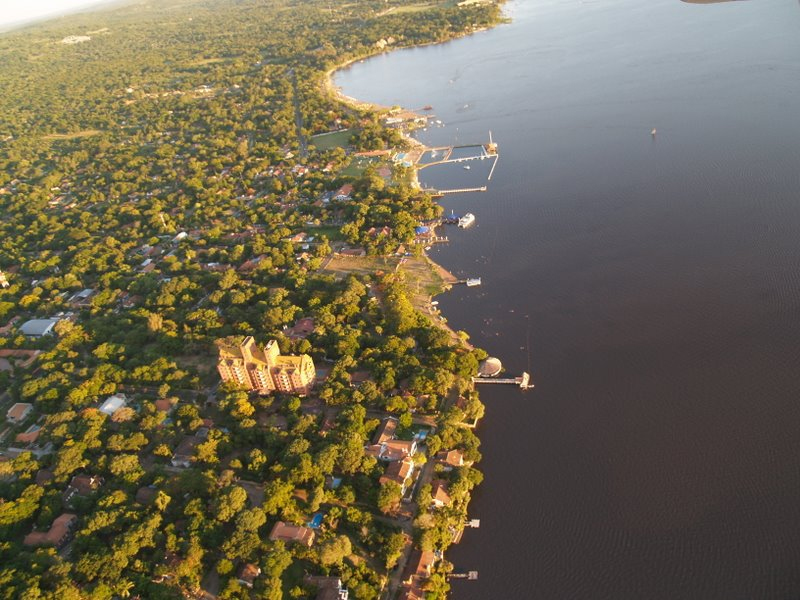
As one of the most important resort towns in Paraguay, San Bernardino, which was founded by German settlers in the 19th century, has one of the highest purchasing power parities in the country.

The market economy is distinguished by a large informal sector, featuring reexport of imported consumer goods to neighboring countries, as well as the activities of thousands of microenterprises and urban street vendors. Nonetheless, over the last 10 years the Paraguayan economy diversified dramatically, with the energy, auto parts and clothing industries leading the way.

Paraguay's most important urban areas are located along the Argentina-Paraguay border: Asunción, Alberdi, Encarnación, Pilar and Ciudad del Este, the latter being the third most important free commercial zone in the world, only trailing behind Miami and Hong Kong. A large percentage of the population, especially in rural areas, derives its living from agricultural activity, often on a subsistence basis. Because of the importance of the informal sector, accurate economic measures are difficult to obtain. The economy grew rapidly between 2003 and 2013 as growing world demand for commodities combined with high prices and favorable weather to support Paraguay's commodity-based export expansion.

In 2012, Paraguay's government introduced the MERCOSUR (FOCEM) system in order to stimulate the economy and job growth through a partnership with both Brazil and Argentina.

One economic partnership that has been on the rise is the one between Paraguay and neighboring Bolivia.

The Central Bank of Paraguay is Paraguay's highest monetary authority, and the country's governing body, in finances and economics. Its headquarters are in Asunción's Carmelitas neighborhood.

=== Agriculture ===
Paraguay is the sixth-largest soybean producer in the world, the second-largest producer of stevia and the ninth-largest exporter of beef.

In 2018, in addition to soy, the country had a large production of maize and sugar cane, where it positioned itself as the 21st largest producer in the world; other important cultures of the country are cassava, rice, wheat, orange, yerba mate, and sorghum. In livestock, Paraguay produced, in 2020, 481 thousand tons of beef, being the 26th largest producer in the world.

Soy farming was largely introduced by Brazilians: in 2019, almost 70% of soy and rice producers in Paraguay were people from Brazil, or descendants of Brazilians (also known as brasiguaios). The first Brazilian producers began to arrive in the country in the 1980s, causing a social disruption up to nowadays. Before the Brazilian influx, much of the land in Paraguay was uncultivated.

More than 80% of the cultivable land is owned by 2.6% of landowners. Nearly 8 million hectares were illegally granted, in violation of the agrarian law, to regime supporters during the dictatorship of Alfredo Stroessner (1954–1989), and the state has done nothing since to identify the beneficiaries of this illicit enrichment. These owners include generals, businessmen, and politicians, former presidents of the Republic, Nicaraguan dictator Anastasio Somoza Debayle, and even the ruling Colorado Party. More than 130 peasant leaders have been assassinated since the fall of Stroessner in 1989.

The methods of appropriating land in Paraguay are numerous. Economist Luis Rojas says that the most common method is to buy land from small producers: "The peasant is offered a sum of money he has never seen in his life. He imagines it's a fortune, leaves for the city, spends it all in three or four months and makes the misery belts grow, because there is no work." Oxfam estimates that 900,000 people have been evicted from the countryside in the last ten years, which represents nearly one-seventh of the population. This crowd of landless peasants is swelling the poverty belts around Asunción, the capital.

=== Industry and manufacturing ===
The World Bank lists the top producing countries each year, based on the total value of production. By the 2019 list, Paraguay had the 79th most valuable industry in the world ($6.9 billion). The country was the seventh largest producer of soybean oil in the world in 2018.

The mineral industry of Paraguay produces about 25% of the country's gross domestic product (GDP) and employs about 31% of the labor force. Production of cement, iron ore, and steel occurs commonly throughout Paraguay's industrial sector. The growth of the industry was further fueled by the maquila industry, with large industrial complexes located in the eastern part of the country. Paraguay put in place many incentives aimed to attract industries to the country. One of them is the so-called "Maquila law", by which companies can relocate to Paraguay, enjoying minimal tax rates.

In the pharmaceutical industry, Paraguayan companies meet around 70% of domestic consumption and have begun to export drugs. Paraguay is supplanting foreign suppliers in meeting the country's drug needs.

In 2003, manufacturing comprised 13.6% of the GDP and it employed about 11% of the working population in 2000. Paraguay's primary manufacturing focus is on food and beverages. Wood products, paper products, hides and furs, and nonmetallic mineral products also contribute to manufacturing totals. Steady growth in the manufacturing GDP during the 1990s (1.2% annually) laid the foundation for 2002 and 2003, when the annual growth rate rose to 2.5%. Growth is also evident in the production of edible oils, garments, organic sugar, meat processing, and steel. Paraguay was ranked 103rd in the Global Innovation Index in 2025.

==== Social issues of the indigenous ====
Literacy rates have been extremely low among Paraguay's indigenous population, who had a literacy rate of 7.1% compared to the 51% rate of the general population as of the 2002 census.

Only 2.5% of Paraguay's indigenous population had access to clean drinking water and only 9.5% had electricity as of 2002.

According to official reports by the National Institute of Statistics (INE), there was an improvement in access to electricity, clean drinking water and garbage collection compared to the data obtained in 2012. The percentage of [indigenous] homes with electricity service increased from 31.2% to 66.7%. Running water services had also an increase in coverage, going from 15.1% to 25.3%, and garbage collection increased from 5.2% to 6.4%. However, some leaders of Paraguayan indigenous communities have denounced discrimination by the education system towards indigenous schools. A census in 2017 revealed that "The percentage of the indigenous population living in poverty in 2017 was 66.2%, almost three times the national average."

=== Transportation ===
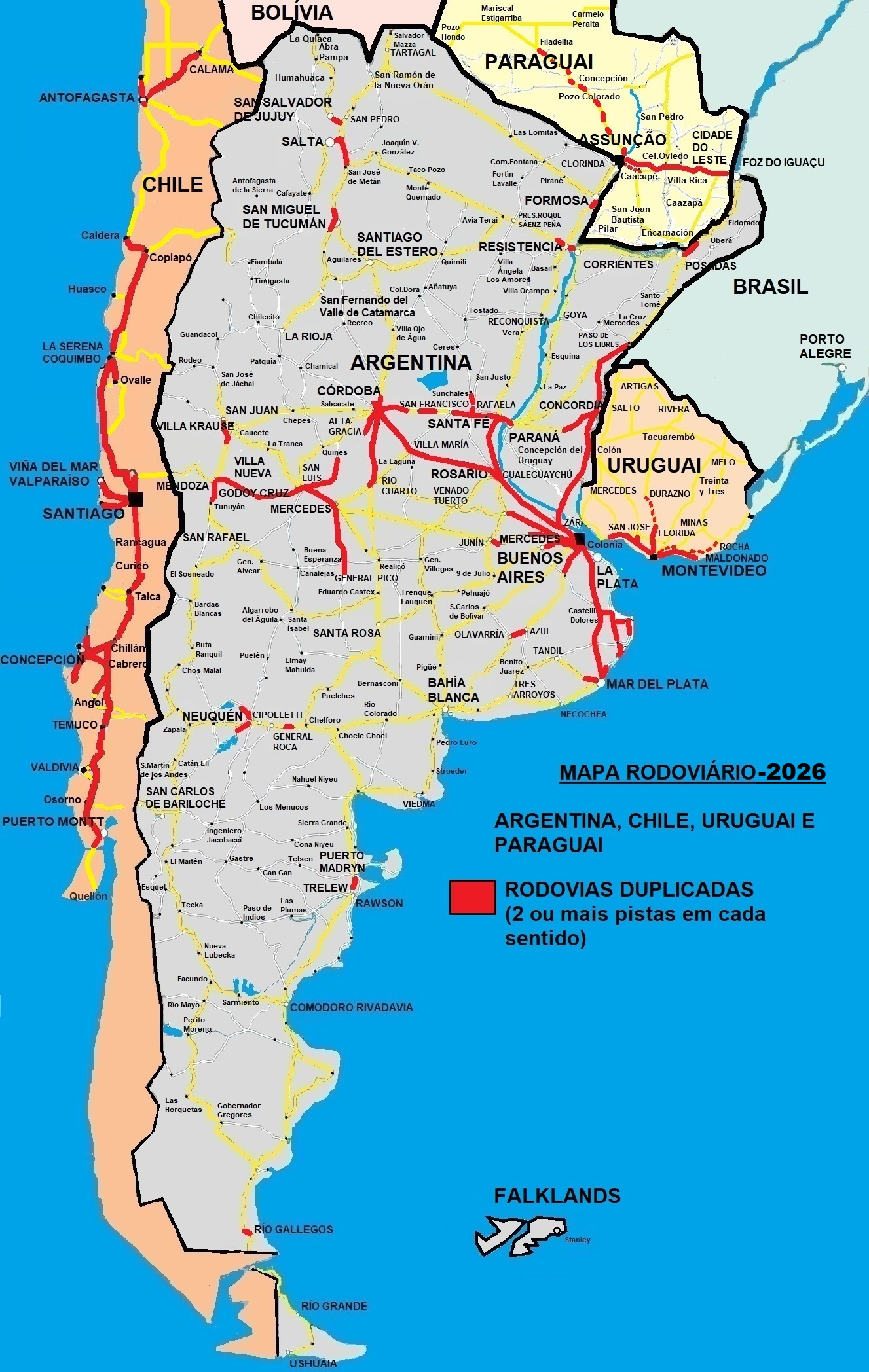
Road system in South America, with divided highways highlighted in red.

According to official data from the M.O.P.C (Ministry of Public Works and Communications of Paraguay), in 2019, there were a total of 78,850 km (48,995 mi) of roads, of which 10,372 km (6,445 mi) were paved. One of the most important recent investments in the country's history is the construction of the Bioceanic Corridor, which will cross the north of Paraguay in a horizontal line, connecting Brazil to Argentina, reaching both the ports of northern Chile, as to Brazilian ports. The work will open a new route for exports of products to Asia, and will enable the development of an isolated region of Paraguay, the Chaco.

In February 2022, Paraguay inaugurated 275 km of the road (about half of the route), connecting Carmelo Peralta (Alto Paraguay), on the border with Brazil, to Loma Plata (Boquerón), in the center of the country. Paraguay has also been implementing the country's first double highway: 149 km of the Route 2, which connects the capital Asunción to Ciudad del Este, on the border with Brazil (the highway that also connects with port of Paranaguá). In January 2022, there were almost 100 km duplicated.

The Paraguay-Paraná waterway system is a natural north–south downstream waterway of 1,600 km of a navigable network area, that gives the region direct access to the ocean, therefore, river transport is important and extensive, concentrating the most commercial maritime traffic to the port of Buenos Aires. Asunción is one of the main ports of Paraguay.

Asunción airport is an important stopover for international airlines and Guaraní International Airport is an important international air cargo hub.

=== Energy ===
The total energy supply is mostly renewable at around 76% (40% hydropower and 36% biomass), the remaining 24% is covered by petroleum derivatives. 60% of the supply is consumed locally. Of the exported energy, 97.1% is electricity and 2.9% is biomass.

Most of Paraguay's electricity is generated by hydropower, making it one of the cleanest in the world.

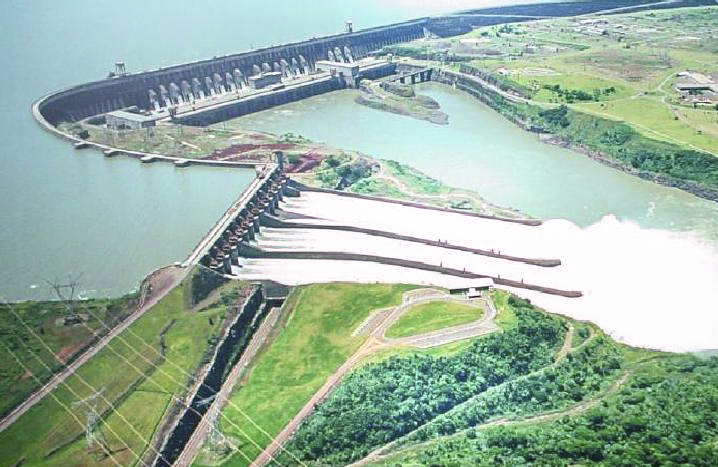
Itaipu Dam, a binational undertaking run by Brazil and Paraguay at the border between the two countries

Paraguay has an installed electrical production capacity of 8,110 MW, producing 63 billion kWh/year in 2016; with domestic consumption of just 15 billion kWh, the excess production is sold to Brazil, Argentina, and Uruguay, making Paraguay the world's largest exporter of electric power. This production is from two large hydroelectric power projects along its borders, including the Itaipu Dam, the world's second largest generating station.

== Demographics ==
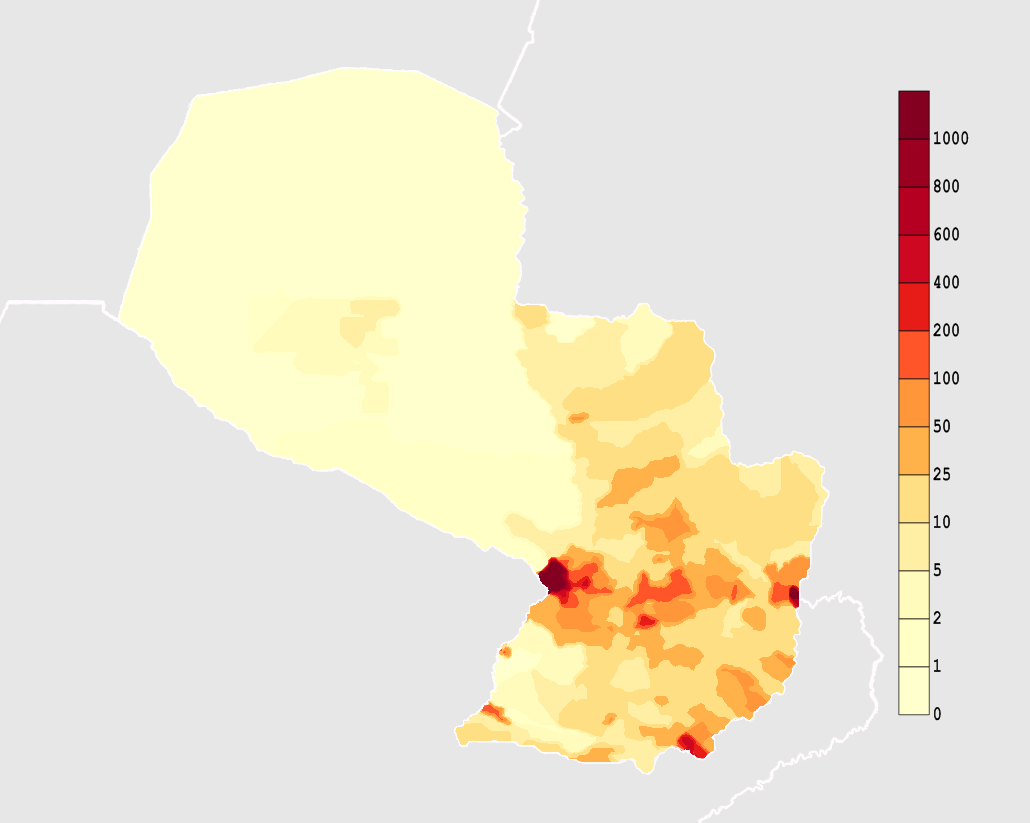
Paraguay population density (people per km^{2})

Paraguay's population is distributed unevenly through the country, with the vast majority of people living in the eastern region near the capital and largest city, Asunción, which accounts for 10% of the country's population. The Gran Chaco region, which includes the Alto Paraguay, Boquerón and Presidente Hayes Department, and accounts for about 60% of the territory, is home to less than 4% of the population. About 63% of Paraguayans live in urban areas, making Paraguay one of the least urbanized nations in South America.

For most of its history, Paraguay has been a recipient of immigrants owing to its low population density, especially after the demographic collapse caused by the Paraguayan War. Immigrants include Italians, Germans, Spanish, English, Russians, Koreans, Chinese, Arab, Japanese, Ukrainians, Poles, Jews, Brazilians, Bolivians, Americans, Colombians, Mexicans, Venezuelans, Chileans, Taiwanese, Peruvians, Asian people, Uruguayans and the largest group of all; Argentines. Along with German Argentines, German Paraguayans are one of the most prominent and growing German communities in South America, with some 25,000 German-speaking Mennonites living in the Paraguayan Chaco. German settlers founded several towns, such as Hohenau, Filadelfia, Neuland, Obligado and Nueva Germania. Several websites that promote German immigration to Paraguay claim that 5–7% of the population is of German ancestry, including 150,000 people of German-Brazilian descent. Similarly, from the 1920–30s, Paraguay received waves of Slavic immigrants who settled in Asunción and Southern Paraguay (Itapúa, Misiones and Ñeembucú), especially in the towns of Fram, Coronel Bogado, Encarnación, San Juan del Paraná, San Ignacio, and Pilar. Paraguay has also been a haven for communities persecuted for the religious faith, like the Bruderhof who were forced to leave England in 1941 because of their pacifist beliefs. Many of these communities have retained their languages and culture, particularly the Brazilians, who represent one of the largest immigrant groups. Many Brazilian Paraguayans are of German, Italian and Polish descent. There are an estimated 8,000 Afro-Paraguayans, comprising 0.13% of the population.

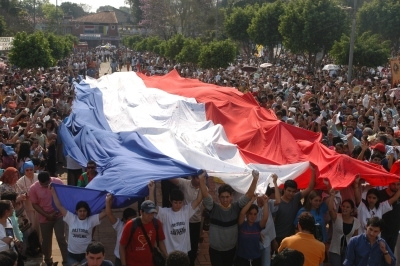
A gathering in Caacupé

There is no official data on the ethnic composition of the Paraguayan population, as the Department of Statistics, Surveys and Censuses of Paraguay does not ask about race and ethnicity in census surveys, although it does inquire about the indigenous population. According to the 2022 census, indigenous people made up 2.3% of Paraguay's total population.

Traditionally, the majority of the Paraguayan population is considered mixed (mestizo in Spanish). According to the 2022 census, Paraguay has a population of 6,109,944, of which 95% are Mestizo/White and 5% are labeled "other", which includes members of 17 distinct ethnolinguistic indigenous groups.

=== Largest cities ===
Largest cities or towns in Paraguay (2022 census)
Rank	Name	Department	Pop.	Rank	Name	Department	Pop.
1	Asunción	Capital District	462,241	11	Encarnación	Itapúa	106,842
2	Ciudad del Este	Alto Paraná	325,819	12	Coronel Oviedo	Caaguazú	98,323
3	Luque	Central	259,705	13	Caaguazú	Caaguazú	98,200
4	Capiatá	Central	236,999	14	Itauguá	Central	93,213
5	San Lorenzo	Central	225,295	15	Presidente Franco	Alto Paraná	88,744
6	Limpio	Central	139,652	16	Mariano Roque Alonso	Central	85,133
7	Pedro Juan Caballero	Amambay	127,437	17	Hernandarias	Alto Paraná	83,285
8	Lambaré	Central	127,150	18	Minga Guazú	Alto Paraná	81,072
9	Ñemby	Central	116,383	19	Concepción	Concepción	73,360
10	Fernando de la Mora	Central	110,255	20	Villa Elisa	Central	71,383

=== Languages ===
Spanish and Guaraní are the two main languages in Paraguay, with both having official status. The Guaraní language is a remarkable trace of the indigenous Guaraní culture that has endured in Paraguay. Guaraní is one of the last commonly used indigenous national languages in South America. In 2015, Spanish was spoken by about 87% of the population, while Guaraní is spoken by more than 90%, or slightly more than 5.8 million speakers. Of rural Paraguayans, 52% are bilingual in Guaraní and Spanish. While Guaraní is still widely spoken, Spanish is generally given a preferential treatment in government, business, media and education as a South American lingua franca.

Portuguese is the third most used language, spoken by 10% in the country, mostly in the departments bordering Brazil. It is spoken by the so-called "Brasiguayos", Brazilians or descendants who crossed west of the border from the 1970s seeking cheap land.

There are also approximately 19 other indigenous languages spoken in Paraguay, many of which are threatened by extinction. Languages such as Guana, Ayoreo, and Ishir (Chamacoco) are considered endangered.

Paraguay ranks relatively well at the EF English Proficiency Index, being at the top 50, as it is the third most English proficient country in South America, after Argentina and Uruguay.

=== Religion ===
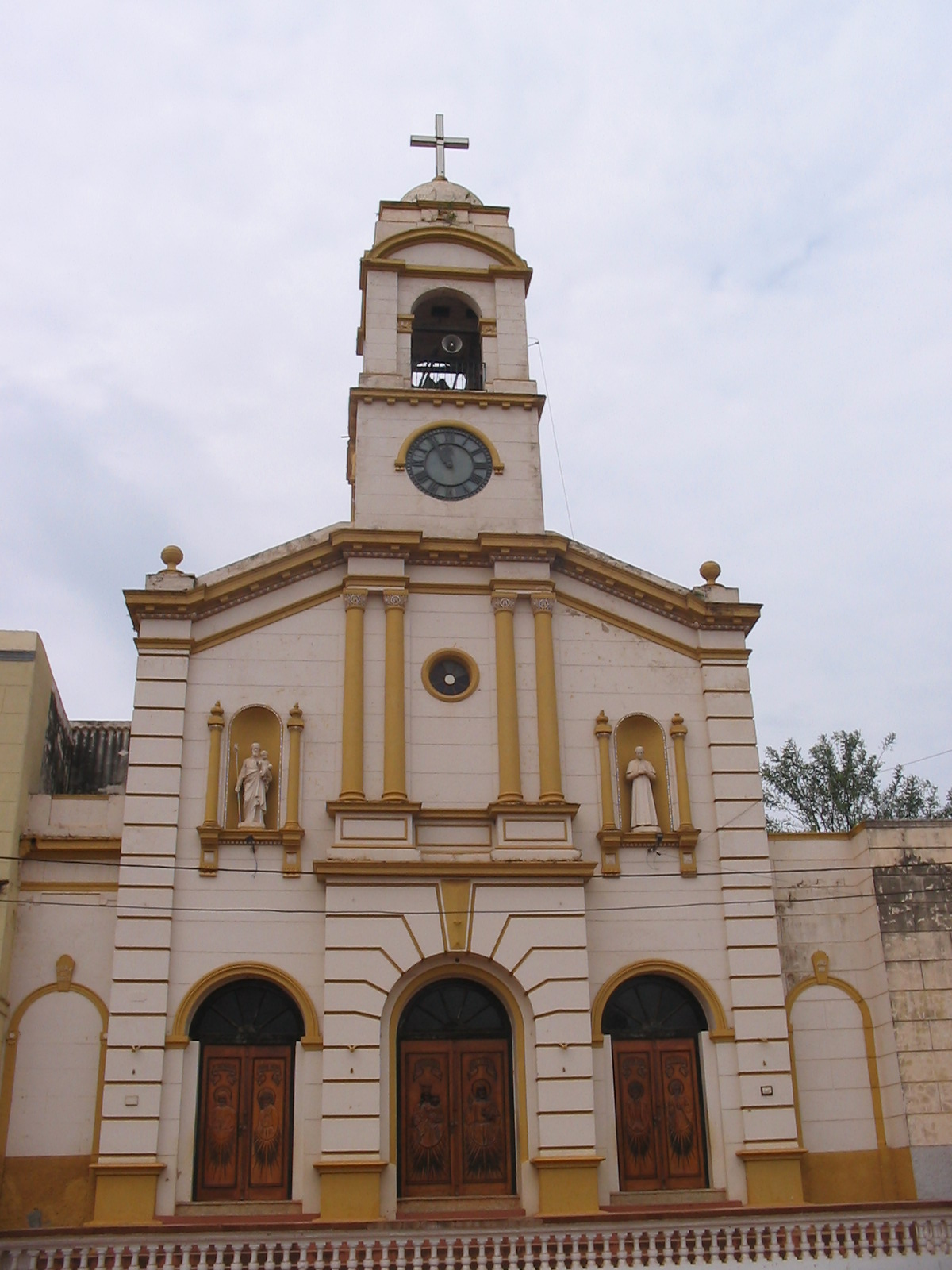
Main Catholic Chapel in Concepción, Paraguay

Christianity, particularly Catholicism, is the dominant religion in Paraguay. According to the 2002 census, 89.9% of the population was Catholic, 6.2% was Evangelical Protestant, 1.1% identified with other Christian sects, and 0.6% practiced indigenous religions. A U.S. State Department report on Religious Freedom names Catholicism, evangelical Protestantism, mainline Protestantism, Judaism (Orthodox, Conservative, and Reform), The Church of Jesus Christ of Latter-day Saints, and the Baháʼí Faith as prominent religious groups. It also mentions a large Muslim community in Alto Paraná (as a result of Middle-Eastern immigration, especially from Lebanon) and a prominent Mennonite community in Boquerón.

=== Education ===
Literacy was about 94.8% for men and 93.18% for women as of 2026. 87.7% of Paraguayans finished the fifth grade according to UNESCO's Educational Development Index 2008. Literacy does not differ much by gender. A more recent study reveals that attendance at primary school by children between 6 and 12 years old is about 98%. Primary education is free, mandatory and takes nine years. Secondary education takes three years.

As of 2026, Paraguay has 59 accredited universities by the CONES (National Council for Higher Education). Main universities, all in the capital city, in Paraguay include:

- National University of Asunción (public and founded in 1889)
- Autonomous University of Asunción (private and founded in 1979)
- Universidad Católica Nuestra Señora de la Asunción (private and run by the church).
- Universidad Americana (private).
- Universidad del Pacífico (private and founded in 1991).

The net primary enrollment rate was at 88% in 2005. Public expenditure on education was about 3.53% of GDP as of 2024. Paraguay dedicated 16.83% of its total public spending to education.

=== Health ===
Development of life expectancy

Average life expectancy in Paraguay is, as of 2024, 73.4 years. Infant mortality was 15 per 1,000 births in 2023. Maternal mortality was 84 per 100,000 live births in the period between 2014 to 2021.

The World Bank has helped the Paraguayan government reduce the country's maternal and infant mortality. The Mother and Child Basic Health Insurance Project aimed to contribute to reducing mortality by increasing the use of selected life-saving services included in the country's Mother and Child Basic Health Insurance Program (MCBI) by women of child-bearing age, and children under age six in selected areas. To this end, the project also targeted improving the quality and efficiency of the health service network within certain areas, in addition to increasing the Ministry of Public Health and Social Welfare's (MSPandBS) management.

In 2023, Public spending on health in Paraguay represented 21.57% of total public spending which represents 4.63% of its GDP.

== Culture ==
Paraguay's cultural heritage can be traced to the extensive intermarriage between the original male Spaniard settlers and indigenous Guaraní women. Modern historians, however, characterise this process as one shaped largely by sexual and economic coercion rather than voluntary union, rooted in the colonial practices of the cuñadazgo and the rancheadas. Their culture is highly influenced by various European countries, including Spain. Therefore, the Paraguayan culture is a fusion of two cultures and traditions: one European, the other, Southern Guaraní. More than 93% of Paraguayans are mestizos, making Paraguay one of the most homogeneous countries in Latin America. A characteristic of this cultural fusion is the extensive bilingualism present to this day: more than 80% of Paraguayans speak both Spanish and the indigenous language, Guaraní. Jopara, a mixture of Guaraní and Spanish, is also widely spoken. As of 2026, it has been reported that the population percentage that speaks both Guaraní and Spanish at home is 38.7%, while those that speak only Guaraní or Spanish are approximately 28% and 31%, respectively.

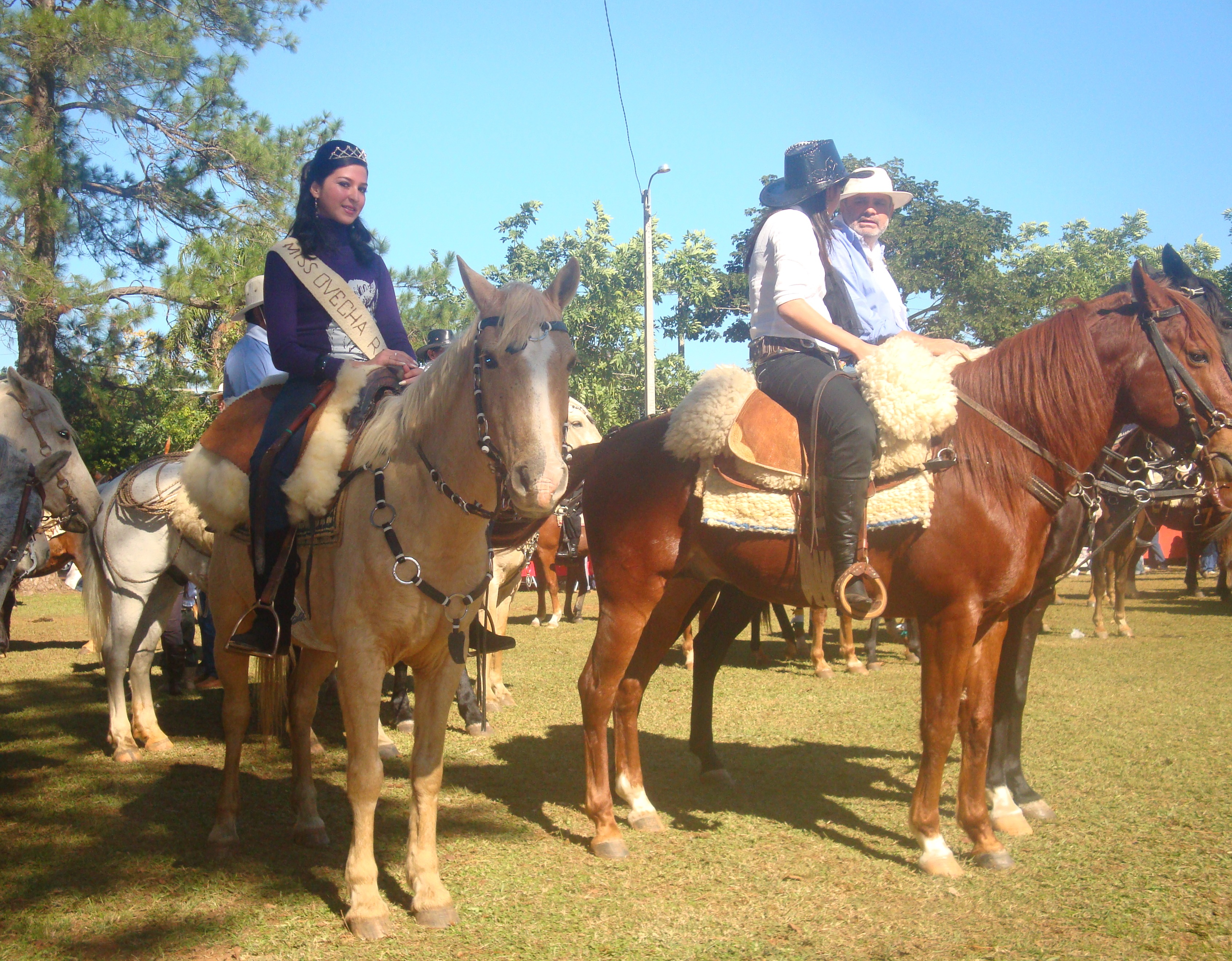
Ovecha Ragué Festival

This cultural fusion is expressed in arts such as embroidery (ao po'í) and lace making (ñandutí). The music of Paraguay, which consists of lilting polkas, bouncy galopas, and languid guaranias, is played on the native harp. Paraguay's culinary heritage is also deeply influenced by this cultural fusion. Several popular dishes contain manioc, a local staple crop similar to the yuca, also known as cassava root, found in the Southwestern United States and Mexico, as well as other indigenous ingredients. A popular dish is sopa paraguaya, similar to a thick corn bread. Another notable food is chipa, a bagel-like bread made from cornmeal, manioc starch, and cheese. Many other dishes consist of different kinds of cheeses, onions, bell peppers, cottage cheese, cornmeal, milk, seasonings, butter, eggs and fresh corn kernels.

The 1950s and 1960s were the time of the birth of a new generation of Paraguayan novelists and poets such as José Ricardo Mazó, Roque Vallejos, and Nobel Prize nominee Augusto Roa Bastos. Several Paraguayan films have been made.

Inside the family, conservative values predominate. In lower classes, godparents have a special relationship to the family, since they are typically chosen because of their favourable social position, in order to provide extra security for the children. Particular respect is owed them, in return for which the family can expect protection and patronage.

The most popular instruments in Paraguayan music are the harp and the guitar. The native genres are the Paraguayan polka and the guarania, characterized by a slow song that was developed by José Asunción Flores around the 1920s.

=== Sports ===
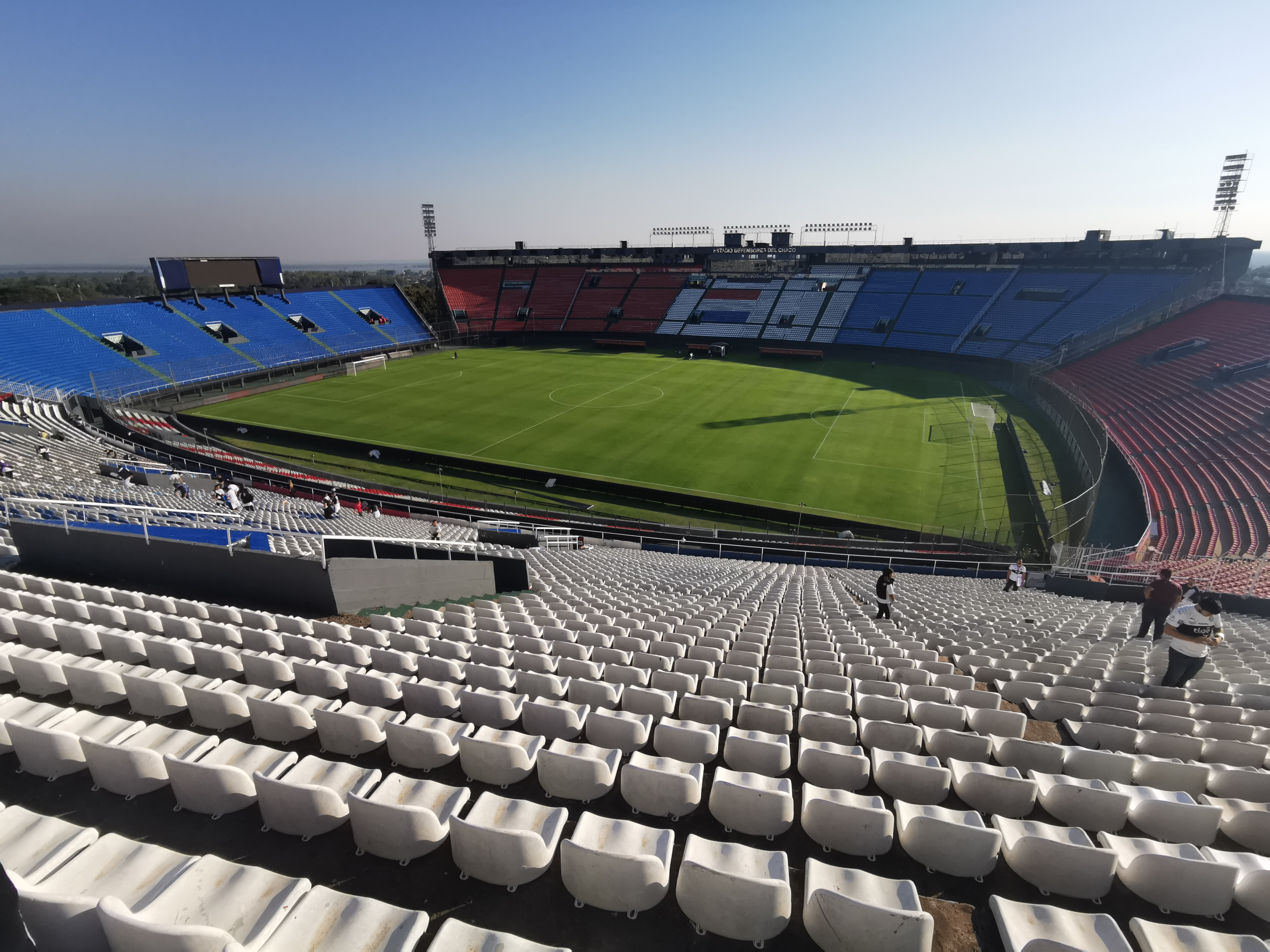
Estadio Defensores del Chaco

Sport is integral to the national culture, with football and basketball being the most popular sports. Other popular sports include volleyball, handball, futsal, swimming, and tennis.

The Paraguay national football team, nicknamed La Albirroja ("The White and Red") or La Garra Guaraní ("The Claw of the Guaraní"), has qualified for nine FIFA World Cup competitions (1930, 1950, 1958, 1986, 1998, 2002, 2006, 2010, 2026). The team's best performance was at the 2010 World Cup, in which they reached the quarter-finals. The national team regularly competes in the Copa América, and have won on two occasions (1953 and 1979). Paraguay's highest ever FIFA World Ranking was 8th (March 2001) and their lowest ever was 103rd (May 1995).

== See also ==
- Bibliography of Paraguay
- Outline of Paraguay
