= List of largest cities and towns in Paraguay by population =

This list includes all cities and towns in Paraguay with population over 10,000, sorted by population. Capital cities of the departments are listed in bold text. All census totals come from the Department of Statistics, Surveys and Censuses (Paraguay)

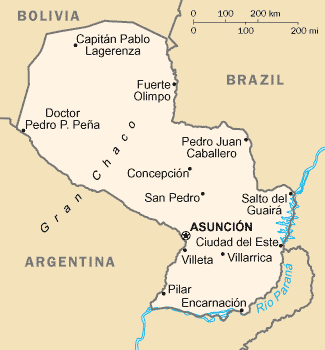
Map of Paraguay

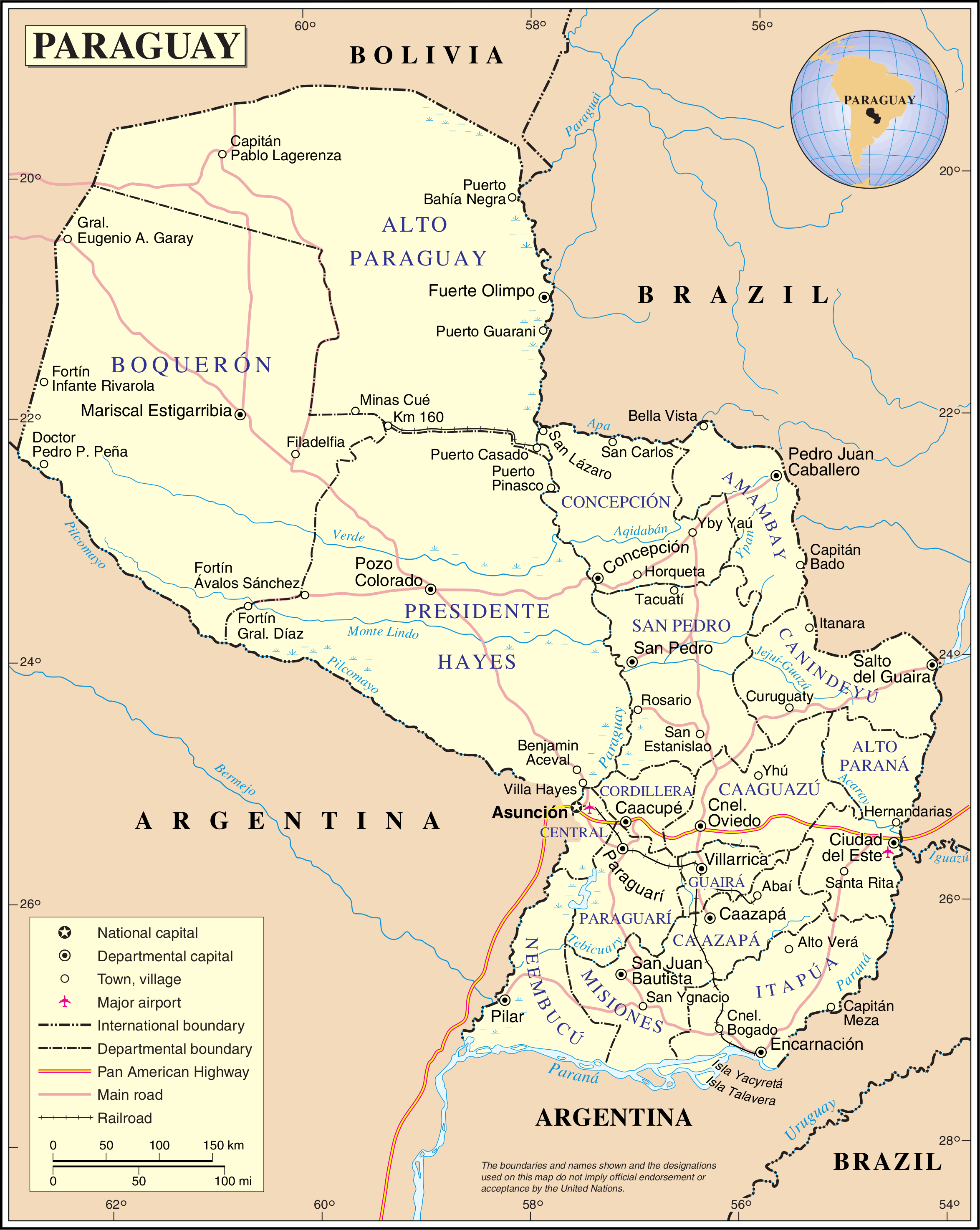
An enlargeable map of the Republic of Paraguay

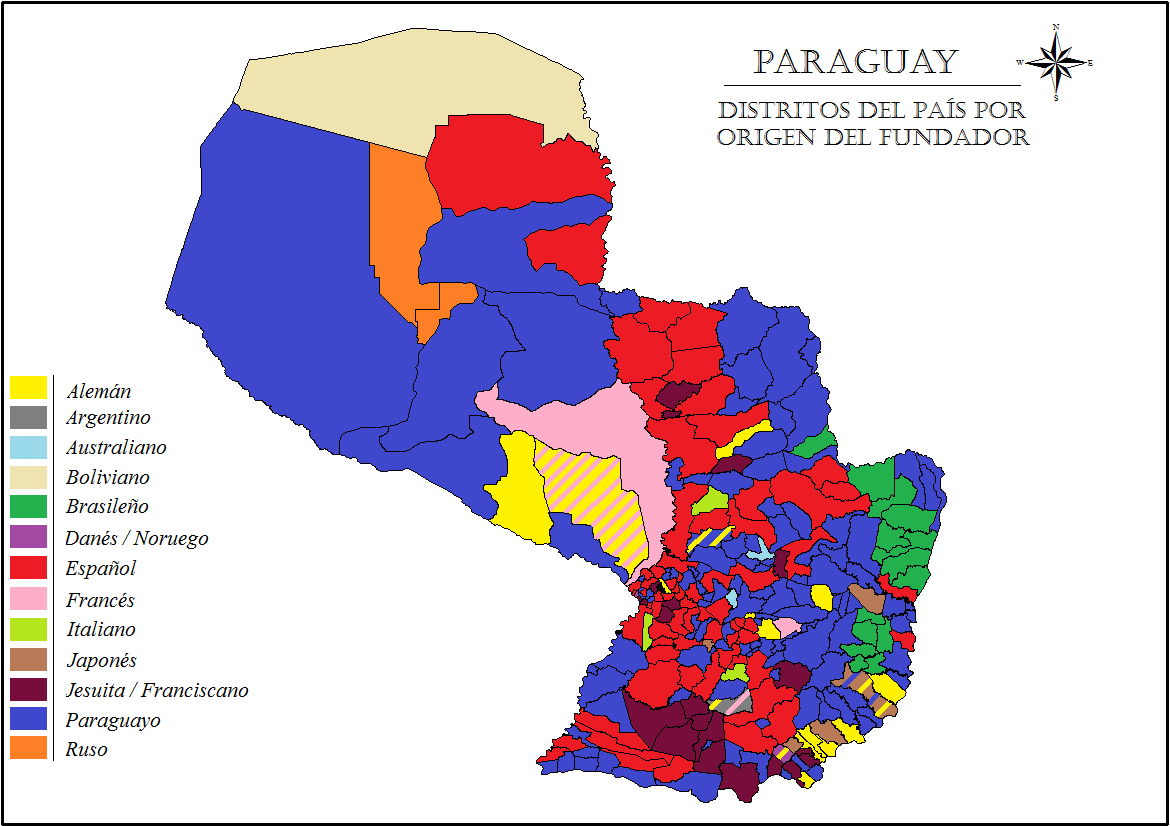
Map of Paraguay indicating the origin of the founders of the different districts in the country by colour.

== Overall ==
Rank	City/town	Department	Population 2002 Census	Population 1992 Census	Change
1	**Asunción**	Capital District	512,112	500,938	+2.23%
2	**Ciudad del Este**	Alto Paraná	222,274	133,881	+66.02%
3	San Lorenzo	Central	204,356	133,395	+53.20%
4	Luque	Central	170,986	84,877	+101.45%
5	Capiatá	Central	154,274	83,773	+84.16%
6	Lambaré	Central	119,795	99,572	+20.31%
7	Fernando de la Mora	Central	113,560	95,072	+19.45%
8	Limpio	Central	73,158	26,177	+179.47%
9	Ñemby	Central	71,909	26,999	+166.34%
10	**Encarnación**	Itapúa	67,173	56,261	+19.40%
11	Mariano Roque Alonso	Central	65,229	39,289	+66.02%
12	**Pedro Juan Caballero**	Amambay	64,592	53,566	+20.58%
13	Villa Elisa	Central	53,166	29,796	+78.43%
14	Caaguazú	Caaguazú	48,941	38,220	+28.05%
15	**Coronel Oviedo**	Caaguazú	48,773	38,316	+27.29%
16	Hernandarias	Alto Paraná	47,266	28,180	+67.73%
17	Presidente Franco	Alto Paraná	47,246	31,825	+48.46%
18	Itauguá	Central	45,577	13,910	+227.66%
19	**Concepción**	Concepción	43,661	35,276	+23.77%
20	**Villarrica**	Guairá	38,961	27,818	+40.06%
21	San Antonio	Central	37,795	7,371	+412.75%
22	**Pilar**	Ñeembucú	24,300	19,121	+27.09%
23	**Caacupé**	Cordillera	19,131	12,382	+54.51%
24	Itá	Central	17,469	14,259	+22.51%
25	Mariscal Estigarribia	Boquerón	16,418	16,418	0.00%
26	**Villa Hayes**	Presidente Hayes	15,823	11,859	+33.43%
27	Minga Guazú	Alto Paraná	14,806	8,914	+66.10%
28	San Ignacio	Misiones	13,716	11,580	+18.45%
29	San Estanislao	San Pedro	13,202	9,132	+44.57%
30	Ayolas	Misiones	10,851	9,143	+18.68%
31	Villeta	Central	10,106	7,439	+35.85%
32	**Areguá**	Central	10,009	6,374	+57.03%

== By department ==
Rank	City/town	Population 2002 Census
Alto Paraná
1	**Ciudad del Este**	222,274
2	Hernandarias	47,266
3	Presidente Franco	47,246
4	Minga Guazú	14,806
Amambay
1	**Pedro Juan Caballero**	64,592
Distrito Capital
1	**Asunción**	512,112
Boquerón
1	Mariscal Estigarribia	16,418
Caaguazú
1	Caaguazú	48,941
2	**Coronel Oviedo**	48,773
Central
1	San Lorenzo	204,356
2	Luque	170,986
3	Capiatá	154,274
4	Lambaré	119,795
5	Fernando de la Mora	113,560
6	Limpio	73,158
7	Ñemby	71,909
8	Mariano Roque Alonso	65,229
9	Villa Elisa	53,166
10	Itauguá	45,577
11	San Antonio	37,795
12	Itá	17,469
13	Villeta	10,106
14	**Areguá**	10,009
Concepción
1	**Concepción**	43,661
Cordillera
1	**Caacupé**	19,131
Guairá
1	**Villarrica**	38,961
Itapúa
1	**Encarnación**	67,173
Misiones
1	San Ignacio	13,716
2	Ayolas	10,851
Ñeembucú
1	**Pilar**	24,300
Presidente Hayes
1	**Villa Hayes**	15,823
San Pedro
1	San Estanislao	13,202

== See also ==
- List of cities in Paraguay
