= Paraná–Paraguay Waterway =

Waterway in South America

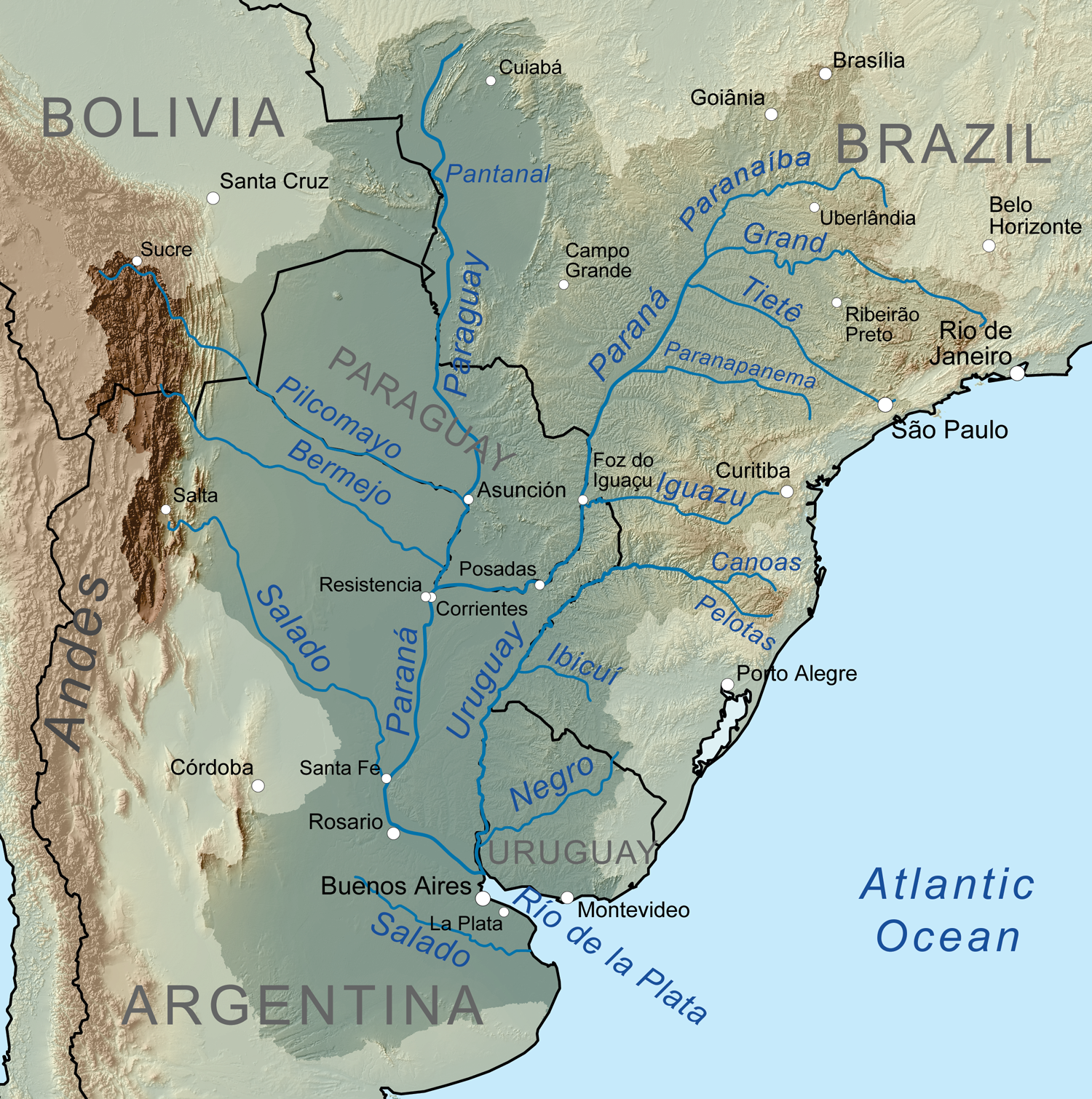
Full extension of the Río de la Plata basin.

The Paraná-Paraguay-Uruguay Waterway is a system of navigable channels along the Paraguay and Paraná rivers and their tributaries, in Argentina, Bolivia, Brazil, Paraguay, and Uruguay. It extends from Cáceres Port in the Brazilian state of Mato Grosso to the Nueva Palmira Port in the Colonia Department of Uruguay.

These countries established the Intergovernmental Waterway Committee (CIH) as the coordinating body for the waterway.

Between 1988 and 2010, there was a significant increase in the transportation of goods along this waterway, from 700,000 tons annually to nearly 17.4 million tons per year. Subsequently, this transport volume continued to grow significantly, surpassing the current figure of 36 million tons per year. In terms of the composition of the cargo, the importance of soy and its derivatives as the dominant products stands out, followed by iron and fuels.

== Works ==
In Argentina, navigational aids and signaling were carried out in a segment that had remained without maintenance for decades, from Santa Fe to the Confluence area at kilometer 1,238 of the Paraná River. In addition to these measures, progress has been made in the channeling of the Paraguay River, particularly in one of the most complex stretches for navigation. In 2013, the construction of the dock at the New Port of Posadas (Argentina) was completed, located near the Posadas Industrial Park. This new port plays a key role as an access point to the Paraná-Paraguay Waterway. Since 2015, Chaco Province has been working on the construction of a logistics center to facilitate interconnection between the Paraná-Paraguay Waterway and the Barranqueras Port. This port is expected to be the most important in the province, further strengthening the region's logistics infrastructure.

In 2011, President Cristina Fernández de Kirchner initiated development works on the Paraná-Paraguay Waterway to allow a 28-foot draft for vessels, later increased to 32 feet. These modifications were made to support the renovation project for the Santa Fe port, with a total investment of $112 million. This project included a series of interventions, such as widening, signaling, and dredging of the Paraná River, to facilitate agricultural production transport. The works covered an extension of more than 650 kilometers of the waterway, enabling 24-hour, year-round navigation in line with the vision of improving efficiency and accessibility in the region's river transport.

The dredging and signaling process of the Paraná River, designed to ensure continuous navigability, covers a stretch of 600 kilometers from Santa Fe to the ports of Barranqueras and Corrientes. This initiative aims to reduce operating costs and improve competitiveness in the transport of Argentine grain. The inauguration of these operations was attended by Governor Hermes Binner, along with his counterparts from Entre Ríos, Sergio Uribarri, and Chaco, Jorge Capitanich.

In 2024, the government of Javier Milei signed a controversial memorandum to install US military personnel on the national territory adjacent to the waterway. The inclusion of US military in the management of the Waterway sparked a conflict between the national government and the northern provinces. Additionally, it allows the installation of US military forces in the Paraná-Paraguay Waterway as part of a complete alignment of government policy with the United States. After the secret agreement became public, the opposition denounced the measure for violating national sovereignty, and several political factions called for the Chief of Staff, Nicolás Posse, to appear before Congress to explain.

== Main cities along the waterway ==
=== On the Paraná river ===
- San Pedro, Argentina
- San Nicolás, Argentina
- Rosario, Argentina
- San Lorenzo, Argentina
- Posadas, Argentina
- Diamante, Argentina
- Paraná, Argentina
- Santa Fe, Argentina
- La Paz, Argentina
- Goya, Argentina
- Reconquista, Argentina
- Bella Vista, Argentina
- Corrientes, Argentina
- Resistencia, Argentina
- Encarnación, Paraguay
- Ciudad del Este, Paraguay
- Foz do Iguaçu, Brazil

=== On the Paraguay river ===
- Asunción, Paraguay
- Humaitá, Paraguay
- Pilar, Paraguay
- Formosa, Argentina
- Concepción, Paraguay
- Porto Murtinho, Brazil
- Corumbá, Brazil
- Cáceres, Brazil
- Puerto Quijarro, Bolivia
- Puerto Busch, Bolivia
- Puerto Suárez, Bolivia

=== On the Uruguay river ===
- Nueva Palmira, Uruguay
