= Capiatá =

Capiatá Kapi'atã
- City
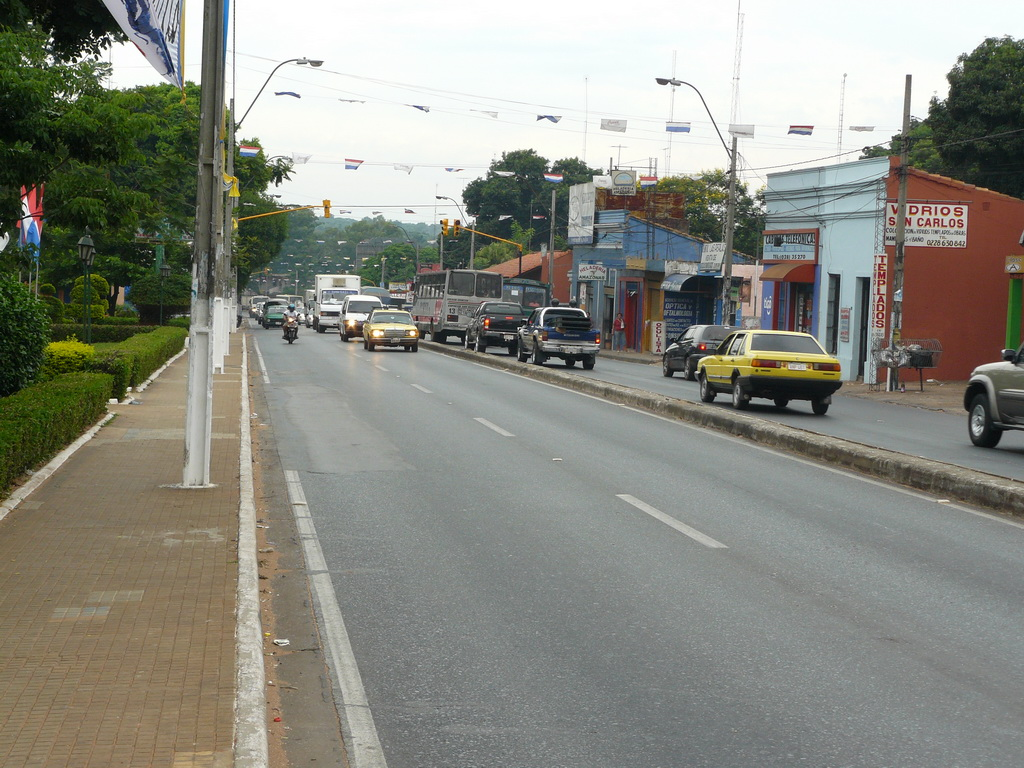
- An avenue in central Capiatá

- Location within Paraguay
- Coordinates: 25°21′0″S 57°25′12″W
- Country: Paraguay
- Department: Central

Area
  - Total: 88.2 km^{2} (34.1 sq mi)
- Elevation: 124 m (407 ft)

Population (2022)
  - Total: 236,999
- Climate: Cfa

Capiatá (Spanish pronunciation: [ka.pjaˈta]; Guarani: Kapi'atã) is a city and a district in Central Department, Paraguay. It had a population of 236,999 inhabitants according to the 2022 national census, making it the fourth-most populous city in the country.

== History ==
Documents in the Archivo Nacional de Asunción from the early seventeenth century refer to Villa de Capiatá. Following the foundation of Asunción on 15 August 1537, the Cabildo and Regimiento were created to oversee the city's welfare and the Villa de Capiatá fell under its jurisdiction. Capiatá was influenced by the Franciscans and its strategic location near Asuncion and as a part of other towns in the Franciscan circuit contributed to it becoming one of the most densely settled areas of the region. It grew around a chapel dedicated to Virgin of Candelaria.

Capiata officially became a city on 20 May 1878, when the municipal board was established. It was elevated as a municipality in 1968, and Luis Alberto Rachit Fiandro became the first Mayor.

== Geography ==
Capiatá is located in the Central Department of Paraguay. It covers an area of 88.2 km^{2} (34.1 sq mi). It is located about 20 km (12 mi) from the Paraguayan capital of Asuncion. It borders seven cities–Areguá, Itauguá, Julián Augusto Saldívar, Luque, Ñemby, San Lorenzo and Ypané.

== Demographics ==
According to the 2022 census, Capiatá had a total population of 236,999 inhabitants, making it the fourth-most populous city in the country. The population consisted of 118,679 females and 118,320 males. The median age of the population was 29 years. The entire population was classified as urban. About 24.7% of the population was aged below 14 years, and 6.8% were more than 65 years.
