= 2024 Copa Paraguay =

Tournament details
- Country: Paraguay
- Dates: 30 April – 6 December 2024
- Teams: 75

Final positions
- Champions: Libertad (3rd title)
- Runners-up: Nacional
- Third place: Sportivo Luqueño
- Copa Libertadores: Nacional

Tournament statistics
- Matches played: 76
- Goals scored: 196 (2.58 per match)

The 2024 Copa Paraguay was the sixth edition of the Copa Paraguay, Paraguay's domestic football cup competition organized by the Paraguayan Football Association (APF). The competition began on 30 April and ended on 6 December 2024.

The defending champions Libertad won their third Copa Paraguay title, defeating Nacional 1–0 in the final match. As Copa Paraguay winners, Libertad qualified for the 2024 Supercopa Paraguay against Olimpia, the Primera División champions with better record in the aggregate table, but their berth to the 2025 Copa Libertadores was instead awarded to the cup runners-up Nacional since they had already qualified for that competition on league performance.

== Format ==
The competition retained the format used in the most recent editions, with 75 participating teams. The 18 Primera B Metropolitana clubs, the 12 Primera C ones, and the 17 Football Union of the Interior (UFI) champions started the competition in the first stage, in which the Primera B and Primera C teams were drawn against a team from their same league in single-legged ties, whilst the UFI teams were paired in seven matchups and a triangular group according to geographical proximity. The 22 match winners as well as the top two teams from the triangular advanced to the second stage, in which the 16 Paraguayan División Intermedia clubs joined the competition, forming 20 single-legged ties. The 20 winning teams then advanced to the third stage, where the 12 Paraguayan Primera División teams entered. The 16 third stage winners advanced to the round of 16. Ties in all rounds are played on a single-legged basis, with a penalty shootout deciding the winner in case of a draw.

Aside from qualification for the Copa Libertadores and the Supercopa Paraguay, the Copa Paraguay champion was awarded a monetary prize of Gs. 1 billion. The runners-up were awarded Gs. 250 million, the third-placed team earned Gs. 100 million, and the fourth-placed team received Gs. 50 million.

== Teams ==
The 2024 edition had 75 participating teams:

Primera División

- 2 de Mayo
- Cerro Porteño
- General Caballero (JLM)
- Guaraní
- Libertad
- Nacional
- Olimpia
- Sol de América
- Sportivo Ameliano
- Sportivo Luqueño
- Sportivo Trinidense
- Tacuary

División Intermedia

- Atlético 3 de Febrero
- 12 de Junio
- Atlético Colegiales
- Deportivo Recoleta
- Deportivo Santaní
- Encarnación
- Fernando de la Mora
- Guaireña
- Independiente (CG)
- Martín Ledesma
- Pastoreo
- Resistencia
- Rubio Ñu
- San Lorenzo
- Sportivo Carapeguá
- Tembetary

Primera B

- 3 de Febrero RB
- 3 de Noviembre
- 12 de Octubre (I)
- 12 de Octubre (SD)
- 24 de Setiembre
- 29 de Setiembre
- Atlántida
- Benjamín Aceval
- Cristóbal Colón (JAS)
- Cristóbal Colón (Ñ)
- Deportivo Capiatá
- General Díaz
- Olimpia (Itá)
- Presidente Hayes
- River Plate
- Silvio Pettirossi
- Sport Colombia
- Sportivo Limpeño

Primera C

- 1 de Marzo (FDM)
- Atlético Juventud
- Capitán Figari
- Deportivo Pinozá
- Fulgencio Yegros
- General Caballero (ZC)
- Humaitá
- Oriental
- Pilcomayo
- Sport Colonial
- Sportivo Iteño
- Valois Rivarola

UFI

The champions from each of the 17 departments of Paraguay qualified for the competition:

- Nacional (Yby Yaú) (Concepción)
- 14 de Mayo (Capiibary) (San Pedro)
- Sport Unión (Cordillera)
- Olimpia (Villarrica) (Guairá)
- Atlético Forestal (Caaguazú)
- Atlético Enramadita (Caazapá)
- Sportivo San Pedro (Itapúa)
- 15 de Mayo Itacurubí (Misiones)
- Guaraní (Paraguarí)
- Patriotas (Alto Paraná)
- Universo FBC (Central)
- 1 de Marzo (Pilar) (Ñeembucú)
- Deportivo 1 de Marzo (Amambay)
- Salto del Guairá (Canindeyú)
- Sportivo San Miguel (Presidente Hayes)
- Atlético Juventud (ME) (Boquerón)
- Atlético 16 de Julio (Alto Paraguay)

== First stage ==
The draw for the first three stages was held on 22 March 2024 and matches in this round were played from 30 April to 16 June 2024.

30 April 2024	Cristóbal Colón (JAS)	3–1	Silvio Pettirossi	Itauguá
17:00 UTC−4	Mendieta 82'; Salinas 89', 90+3'	Report	Amarilla 17'	Stadium: Luis Salinas; Referee: Samuel Morales

30 April 2024	12 de Octubre (I)	1–2	Olimpia (Itá)	Itauguá
19:30 UTC−4	Beltrán 25'	Report	Valdez 70'; Talavera 83'	Stadium: Luis Salinas; Referee: Jhonatan González

1 May 2024	Cristóbal Colón (Ñ)	1–0	Presidente Hayes	Asunción
17:00 UTC−4	Cantero 4'	Report		Stadium: Ricardo Gregor; Referee: Fredy Hermosilla

1 May 2024	River Plate	1–2	24 de Setiembre	Asunción
19:30 UTC−4	Núñez 53' (pen.)	Report	Benítez 3'; Pessolani 45'	Stadium: Ricardo Gregor; Referee: Carlos Figueredo

2 May 2024	Atlántida	3–2	3 de Febrero RB	Capiatá
17:00 UTC−4	Quintana 13', 24' (pen.); Cáceres 58'	Report	Ré 8'; Peralta 70'	Stadium: Erico Galeano; Referee: Alipio Colmán
Note: Match suspended after 5 minutes of play due to poor weather. It was rescheduled to 13 June 2024, 17:30 local time at Estadio Gunther Vogel, San Lorenzo.

14 May 2024	Sportivo San Pedro	1–5	Atlético Enramadita	Villarrica
17:00 UTC−4	Torres 45'	Report	F. Martínez 8'; Irala 64'; Ab. Cristaldo 78'; Al. Cristaldo 79'; Morel 90+2'	Stadium: Parque del Guairá; Referee: Fabio Villalba

14 May 2024	Guaraní (Paraguarí)	1–1 (4–3 p)	Olimpia (Villarrica)	Villarrica
19:30 UTC−4	Ortiz 77'	Report	Araujo 67'	Stadium: Parque del Guairá; Referee: Pedro Baranda
	Penalties
	Rojas (penalty scored); Acosta (penalty scored); T. Cañiza (penalty scored); Ramírez (penalty missed); E. Martínez (penalty missed); Sanabria (penalty scored)		(penalty scored) Riquelme; (penalty missed) De Souza; (penalty scored) Valdelamar; (penalty missed) Rentería; (penalty scored) Espínola; (penalty missed) Araujo

15 May 2024	Atlético Forestal	0–1	Patriotas	San Estanislao
17:00 UTC−4		Report	González 17'	Stadium: Juan José Vázquez; Referee: Alcides Gray

15 May 2024	Salto del Guairá	4–0	14 de Mayo (Capiibary)	San Estanislao
19:30 UTC−4	Brítez 36', 59'; Giménez 85'; De Souza 90+2'	Report		Stadium: Juan José Vázquez; Referee: Luis Trinidad

16 May 2024	Capitán Figari	5–2	Oriental	Villa Hayes
17:00 UTC−4	Insfrán 3', 36'; Fernández 59', 66'; Duarte 90'	Report	Rotela 81', 90+1'	Stadium: Isidro Rousillón; Referee: Marcos Galeano

16 May 2024	General Caballero (ZC)	1–3	Sportivo Iteño	Villa Hayes
19:30 UTC−4	I. Cañete 65'	Report	P. Florentín 38'; N. Cáceres 71'; Ramos 85'	Stadium: Isidro Rousillón; Referee: Víctor Ruiz

28 May 2024	Deportivo Pinozá	1–1 (6–5 p)	Atlético Juventud	Asunción
17:00 UTC−4	Silveira 5'	Report	Barreto 77' (pen.)	Stadium: Ricardo Gregor; Referee: Ángel Fleytas
	Penalties
	Salgado (penalty scored); Candia (penalty missed); Casaccia (penalty scored); Saavedra (penalty missed); Mora (penalty scored); Sanabria (penalty scored); Samaniego (penalty missed); Cano (penalty scored); Garay (penalty scored)		(penalty scored) Barreto; (penalty missed) García; (penalty scored) Ruiz; (penalty missed) Benítez; (penalty scored) Galeano; (penalty scored) Figueredo; (penalty missed) Vera; (penalty scored) Pineda; (penalty missed) Miño

28 May 2024	General Díaz	0–4	Sportivo Limpeño	Asunción
19:30 UTC−4		Report	Vera 39', 79'; Matta 64'; Giménez 73'	Stadium: Ricardo Gregor; Referee: César Herebia

29 May 2024	Pilcomayo	3–1	Valois Rivarola	San Lorenzo
17:00 UTC−4	Sánchez 22'; Núñez 62'; Agüero 79'	Report	Fin 87' (pen.)	Stadium: Gunther Vogel; Referee: Fredy Hermosilla

29 May 2024	Humaitá	2–0	1 de Marzo (FDM)	San Lorenzo
19:30 UTC−4	Ramírez 45+1' (pen.); Román 75'	Report		Stadium: Gunther Vogel; Referee: Julio Ojeda

30 May 2024	Sport Colonial	0–0 (1–3 p)	Fulgencio Yegros	Itauguá
17:00 UTC−4		Report		Stadium: Luis Salinas; Referee: Jhonatan González
	Penalties
	I. Ortellado (penalty scored); Caicedo (penalty missed); Ramírez (penalty missed); López (penalty missed)		(penalty scored) Ayala; (penalty scored) Arrúa; (penalty scored) Amarilla; (penalty missed) Ávalos

30 May 2024	1 de Marzo (Pilar)	1–0	15 de Mayo Itacurubí	Itauguá
19:30 UTC−4	Enciso 40'	Report		Stadium: Luis Salinas; Referee: Blas Medina

11 June 2024	Universo FBC	0–1	Sport Unión	Capiatá
15:45 UTC−4		Report	Navarro 46' (o.g.)	Stadium: Erico Galeano; Referee: Blas Medina

11 June 2024	3 de Noviembre	1–2	Deportivo Capiatá	Capiatá
18:00 UTC−4	O. Ávila 90+3'	Report	B. Mendieta 24'; Sosa 89'	Stadium: Erico Galeano; Referee: César Rolón

12 June 2024	Sportivo San Miguel	2–2 (4–3 p)	Atlético Juventud (ME)	Villa Hayes
17:00 UTC−4	Páez 22'; Cabañas 75'	Report	D. Villalba 27', 73'	Stadium: Isidro Rousillón; Referee: Jhonathan González
	Penalties
	Páez (penalty scored); Garcete (penalty missed); Figueredo (penalty scored); Carril (penalty scored); Lazaga (penalty missed); Almeida (penalty scored)		(penalty scored) S. Ruiz; (penalty missed) Vera; (penalty scored) M. Ruiz; (penalty scored) Rolón; (penalty missed) J. Ruiz; (penalty missed) Duarte

12 June 2024	Benjamín Aceval	2–1	Sport Colombia	Villa Hayes
19:30 UTC−4	López 73' (pen.), 90+5' (pen.)	Report	Martínez 50' (pen.)	Stadium: Isidro Rousillón; Referee: Edgar Galeano

13 June 2024	29 de Setiembre	1–3	12 de Octubre (SD)	San Lorenzo
20:00 UTC−4	Gómez 35'	Report	Negrete 5'; González 58', 79'	Stadium: Gunther Vogel; Referee: Zulma Quiñónez
Note: Match originally scheduled for 2 May 2024, 19:30 local time at Estadio Erico Galeano, Capiatá but suspended due to poor weather. It was rescheduled to 13 June 2024, 20:00 local time.

=== Triangular group ===
Pos	Team	Pld	W	D	L	GF	GA	GD	Pts	Qualification
1	Nacional (Yby Yaú)	2	2	0	0	8	2	+6	6	Advance to Second stage
2	Atlético 16 de Julio	2	1	0	1	3	5	−2	3	Advance to Second stage
3	Deportivo 1 de Marzo	2	0	0	2	2	6	−4	0	

Source: APF
Rules for classification: 1) Points, 2) Goal difference, 3) Goals for, 4) Drawing of lots.

10 June 2024	Deportivo 1 de Marzo	1–2	Atlético 16 de Julio	Pedro Juan Caballero
15:30 UTC−4	Centurión 35'	Report	E. Vera 65'; Nauje 76'	Stadium: Río Parapití; Referee: Fredy Hermosilla

13 June 2024	Atlético 16 de Julio	1–4	Nacional (Yby Yaú)	Pedro Juan Caballero
15:00 UTC−4	Da Silva 65'	Report	Ojeda 1'; Valdez 43' (pen.); Cardozo 51'; Moreno 90+3'	Stadium: Río Parapití; Referee: Francisco Osorio

16 June 2024	Nacional (Yby Yaú)	4–1	Deportivo 1 de Marzo	Pedro Juan Caballero
15:30 UTC−4	Godoy 33'; Candia 35'; Jacquet 79'; R. González 90'	Report	Centurión 11'	Stadium: Río Parapití; Referee: Juan Jara

== Second stage ==
The second stage fixture was announced on 25 June 2024 and matches in this round were played from 3 to 18 July 2024.

3 July 2024	Guaraní (Paraguarí)	2–1	Pastoreo	Caaguazú
14:00 UTC−4	Sanabria 30' (pen.); Rentería 90+2'	Report	Borja 41'	Stadium: Liga Caaguazú de Fútbol; Referee: José Armoa

3 July 2024	Patriotas	2–2 (2–4 p)	Deportivo Santaní	Ciudad del Este
16:15 UTC−4	Domínguez 65'; Morales 90+5'	Report	Gómez 27', 31'	Stadium: Antonio Aranda; Referee: Arthur Afara
	Penalties
	Ovelar (penalty scored); Figueredo (penalty missed); Portillo (penalty missed); Bernal (penalty scored)		(penalty scored) Florenciañez; (penalty scored) G. González; (penalty missed) Villamayor; (penalty scored) Echeverria; (penalty scored) Silva

3 July 2024	Atlético Enramadita	1–2	Atlético 3 de Febrero	Ciudad del Este
18:30 UTC−4	Al. Cristaldo 30' (pen.)	Report	D. González 6'; Zárate 62'	Stadium: Antonio Aranda; Referee: Juan Jara

4 July 2024	Deportivo Pinozá	0–3	Encarnación	Encarnación
14:00 UTC−4		Report	Machado 22'; Acuña 78'; Olmedo 81'	Stadium: Villa Alegre; Referee: Julio Ojeda

4 July 2024	Pilcomayo	1–4	Atlético Colegiales	San Lorenzo
16:15 UTC−4	Gaette 3'	Report	Fernández 47'; Palavecino 59'; Roa 90', 90+4'	Stadium: Gunther Vogel; Referee: Blas Medina

4 July 2024	Sportivo Iteño	1–0	San Lorenzo	San Lorenzo
18:30 UTC−4	Montiel 41'	Report		Stadium: Gunther Vogel; Referee: César Herebia

9 July 2024	Salto del Guairá	1–0	Deportivo Capiatá	Villarrica
14:00 UTC−4	Brítez 76'	Report		Stadium: Parque del Guairá; Referee: Jhonatan González

9 July 2024	Cristóbal Colón (Ñ)	1–5	Guaireña	Villarrica
16:15 UTC−4	N. Cáceres 8'	Report	Salem 30'; Duarte 46'; Ruiz Díaz 58'; Dos Santos 74' (o.g.); Vázquez 81'	Stadium: Parque del Guairá; Referee: Nelson Palma

10 July 2024	Humaitá	2–4	Sport Unión	Villa Hayes
14:00 UTC−4	Benítez 25'; Emery 79'	Report	Díaz 32', 50'; Ozuna 38'; Baranda 46'	Stadium: Isidro Roussillón; Referee: Juan Jara

10 July 2024	Sportivo San Miguel	1–3	Deportivo Recoleta	Villa Hayes
16:15 UTC−4	Morel 40'	Report	Asagidigbi 10'; T. Vidal 20'; L. Vidal 90+5'	Stadium: Isidro Roussillón; Referee: Blas Medina

11 July 2024	24 de Setiembre	1–0	12 de Junio	Areguá
14:00 UTC−4	Araújo 15'	Report		Stadium: Próculo Cortázar; Referee: Arthur Afara

11 July 2024	Olimpia (Itá)	0–1	Martín Ledesma	Capiatá
16:15 UTC−4		Report	López 61' (pen.)	Stadium: Erico Galeano; Referee: Fredy Hermosilla

11 July 2024	Fulgencio Yegros	0–1	Tembetary	Capiatá
18:30 UTC−4		Report	Mereles 51'	Stadium: Erico Galeano; Referee: César Rolón

16 July 2024	1 de Marzo (Pilar)	1–3	Benjamín Aceval	Villarrica
16:00 UTC−4	C. Benítez 65'	Report	Castro 20', 26'; Toledo 43'	Stadium: Parque del Guairá; Referee: Guillermo Chamorro

16 July 2024	Nacional (Yby Yaú)	1–2	Sportivo Carapeguá	Villarrica
18:30 UTC−4	Valdez 90+3' (pen.)	Report	Montiel 32'; Ayala 70'	Stadium: Parque del Guairá; Referee: Nelson Palma

17 July 2024	12 de Octubre (SD)	1–0	Capitán Figari	Asunción
14:00 UTC−4	Corvalán 85'	Report		Stadium: Ricardo Gregor; Referee: Blas Medina

17 July 2024	Atlántida	0–0 (2–3 p)	Independiente (CG)	Asunción
16:15 UTC−4		Report		Stadium: Ricardo Gregor; Referee: César Rolón
	Penalties
	Santacruz (penalty missed); Ayala (penalty scored); Cabrera (penalty missed); González (penalty scored); Navarro (penalty missed)		(penalty scored) Dietze; (penalty missed) Rolón; (penalty scored) Brítez; (penalty scored) Montiel

17 July 2024	Sportivo Limpeño	1–1 (6–5 p)	Resistencia	Asunción
18:30 UTC−4	Vera 79'	Report	Fiol 7'	Stadium: Tomás Beggan Correa; Referee: Marcos Galeano
	Penalties
	Fleitas (penalty scored); Duarte (penalty scored); Saucedo (penalty scored); Coronel (penalty scored); Vera (penalty scored); Méndez (penalty scored)		(penalty scored) Garcete; (penalty scored) Lezcano; (penalty scored) Villalba; (penalty scored) Amarilla; (penalty scored) Fiol; (penalty missed) Aguilera

18 July 2024	Atlético 16 de Julio	0–1	Fernando de la Mora	Villa Hayes
16:15 UTC−4		Report	Zárate 49'	Stadium: Isidro Roussillón; Referee: César Herebia

18 July 2024	Cristóbal Colón (JAS)	2–0	Rubio Ñu	Villa Hayes
18:30 UTC−4	A. Ayala 3'; Alfonso 61'	Report		Stadium: Isidro Roussillón; Referee: José Armoa

== Bracket ==
Third stage
Deportivo Recoleta	2 (4)
Cerro Porteño (p)	2 (5)
Sportivo Limpeño	0
Sol de América	2
Encarnación (p)	0 (4)
Tacuary	0 (3)
Deportivo Santaní	0
Libertad	1
12 de Octubre (SD)	1
Sportivo Trinidense	3
Salto del Guairá	1
Sportivo Luqueño	3
Guaraní (Paraguarí)	1 (4)
24 de Setiembre (p)	1 (5)
Martín Ledesma	0
Guaireña	1
Atlético Colegiales	0
Olimpia	3
Atlético 3 de Febrero (p)	0 (4)
General Caballero (JLM)	0 (3)
Cristóbal Colón (JAS)	0
Nacional	5
Tembetary	0
2 de Mayo	2
Benjamín Aceval	1
Sportivo Ameliano	2
Sport Unión	0
Guaraní	7
Independiente (CG)	0 (3)
Sportivo Iteño (p)	0 (4)
Sportivo Carapeguá	2
Fernando de la Mora	1

Round of 16
Cerro Porteño	1
Sol de América	2
Encarnación	0
Libertad	2
Sportivo Trinidense	2 (3)
Sportivo Luqueño (p)	2 (4)
24 de Setiembre	0
Guaireña	1
Olimpia	2
Atlético 3 de Febrero	0
Nacional	2
2 de Mayo	1
Sportivo Ameliano	1 (3)
Guaraní (p)	1 (4)
Sportivo Iteño	0
Sportivo Carapeguá	1

Quarter-finals
Sol de América	0 (2)
Libertad (p)	0 (4)
Sportivo Luqueño	1
Guaireña	0
Olimpia	0
Nacional	2
Guaraní	1
Sportivo Carapeguá	0

Semi-finals
Libertad	2
Sportivo Luqueño	0
Nacional	2
Guaraní	1

Final
Libertad	1
Nacional	0
Third place play-off
Sportivo Luqueño (p)	0 (5)
Guaraní	0 (4)

== Third stage ==
The fixture for this stage's first two weeks of play was announced on 15 August 2024 and matches in this round were played from 20 August to 19 September 2024.

20 August 2024	12 de Octubre (SD)	1–3	Sportivo Trinidense	Asunción
16:30 UTC−4	Blanco 45+1'	Report	Giménez 49'; Andrada 63'; Orzusa 82'	Stadium: Martín Torres; Referee: Carlos Figueredo

20 August 2024	Sport Unión	0–7	Guaraní	Asunción
19:00 UTC−4		Report	Alcaraz 22', 26', 35', 73' (pen.); Pereira 63'; González 84', 86'	Stadium: Rogelio Livieres; Referee: Álvaro Giménez

21 August 2024	Guaraní (Paraguarí)	1–1 (4–5 p)	24 de Setiembre	Capiatá
14:00 UTC−4	Saucedo 87'	Report	R. Florenciáñez 84'	Stadium: Erico Galeano; Referee: Ángel Fleytas
	Penalties
	Rojas (penalty scored); Caballero (penalty scored); Valdemar (penalty missed); Núñez (penalty scored); Cañiza (penalty scored); Vera (penalty missed)		(penalty scored) Ó. Florenciáñez; (penalty missed) R. Florenciáñez; (penalty scored) Araújo; (penalty scored) J. Florenciáñez; (penalty scored) C. Benítez; (penalty scored) T. Benítez

21 August 2024	Atlético 3 de Febrero	0–0 (4–3 p)	General Caballero (JLM)	Ciudad del Este
16:30 UTC−4		Report		Stadium: Antonio Aranda; Referee: Aldo Quiñónez
	Penalties
	Jiménez (penalty scored); González (penalty scored); Allende (penalty missed); Vera (penalty scored); Ibarra (penalty scored)		(penalty scored) Vega; (penalty missed) Franco; (penalty scored) Armoa; (penalty missed) Furlan; (penalty scored) Arévalos

4 September 2024	Tembetary	0–2	2 de Mayo	San Estanislao
16:30 UTC−4		Report	Bogado 25', 61'	Stadium: La Catedral; Referee: Alipio Colmán

4 September 2024	Cristóbal Colón (JAS)	0–5	Nacional	Asunción
19:00 UTC−4		Report	Caballero 14', 33', 38'; Gaona 56'; Franco 86'	Stadium: Arsenio Erico; Referee: Carlos Figueredo

5 September 2024	Salto del Guairá	1–3	Sportivo Luqueño	Ciudad del Este
17:30 UTC−4	Mendoza 14'	Report	Otálvaro 59'; K. Pereira 90+1'; Ferreira 90+3'	Stadium: Antonio Aranda; Referee: Marco Franco

5 September 2024	Atlético Colegiales	0–3	Olimpia	Itauguá
20:00 UTC−4		Report	Arrúa 18'; D. González 32'; Morínigo 56'	Stadium: Luis Salinas; Referee: Álvaro Giménez

7 September 2024	Sportivo Limpeño	0–2	Sol de América	Villa Elisa
17:00 UTC−4		Report	Dietze 45'; Amarilla 87'	Stadium: Luis Alfonso Giagni; Referee: Dionicio Cristaldo

7 September 2024	Deportivo Santaní	0–1	Libertad	Villa Elisa
19:30 UTC−4		Report	Franco 19'	Stadium: Luis Alfonso Giagni; Referee: Álvaro Giménez

8 September 2024	Benjamín Aceval	1–2	Sportivo Ameliano	Asunción
18:30 UTC−4	López 66'	Report	Giménez 58'; Valdez 70'	Stadium: Martín Torres; Referee: Carlos Figueredo

9 September 2024	Sportivo Carapeguá	2–1	Fernando de la Mora	Asunción
17:00 UTC−4	I. Ramos 79'; Parris 90+2'	Report	Bóveda 17'	Stadium: Ricardo Gregor; Referee: César Herebia

9 September 2024	Independiente (CG)	0–0 (3–4 p)	Sportivo Iteño	Asunción
19:30 UTC−4		Report		Stadium: Ricardo Gregor; Referee: Víctor Robles
	Penalties
	Rolón (penalty scored); Báez (penalty scored); Álvarez (penalty scored); Miers (penalty missed); Martínez (penalty missed)		(penalty scored) Farías; (penalty scored) N. López; (penalty missed) Rodas; (penalty scored) F. López; (penalty scored) Ramos

18 September 2024	Martín Ledesma	0–1	Guaireña	Capiatá
17:00 UTC−4		Report	Céspedes 45'	Stadium: Erico Galeano; Referee: Julio Ojeda

18 September 2024	Deportivo Recoleta	2–2 (4–5 p)	Cerro Porteño	Villa Elisa
19:30 UTC−4	Ríos 24'; Pérez 45+1'	Report	Da Costa 43', 69'	Stadium: Luis Alfonso Giagni; Referee: Álvaro Giménez
	Penalties
	Asagidigbi (penalty scored); Ríos (penalty scored); González (penalty scored); T. Vidal (penalty missed); Bareiro (penalty scored)		(penalty scored) Da Costa; (penalty scored) Iturbe; (penalty scored) Morel; (penalty scored) Carrizo; (penalty scored) Báez

19 September 2024	Encarnación	0–0 (4–3 p)	Tacuary	Encarnación
19:30 UTC−4		Report		Stadium: Villa Alegre; Referee: Víctor Robles
	Penalties
	Santander (penalty scored); González (penalty scored); Ortiz (penalty scored); Coronel (penalty scored)		(penalty missed) Valdeci; (penalty scored) Gauto; (penalty scored) Núñez; (penalty scored) Lezcano; (penalty missed) Bedoya

== Round of 16 ==
The fixture for this stage's first week of play was announced on 26 September 2024 and matches in this round were played from 1 to 16 October 2024.

1 October 2024	Sportivo Iteño	0–1	Sportivo Carapeguá	Capiatá
17:00 UTC−4		Report	Aguada 47'	Stadium: Erico Galeano; Referee: Dionicio Cristaldo

1 October 2024	Sportivo Trinidense	2–2 (3–4 p)	Sportivo Luqueño	Luque
19:30 UTC−4	Romero 28'; Charpentier 90+3'	Report	R. Ferreira 18'; J. Benítez 80'	Stadium: CONMEBOL; Referee: Aldo Quiñónez
	Penalties
	Riveros (penalty scored); Maciel (penalty scored); C. Benítez (penalty missed); Arévalo (penalty scored); Salcedo (penalty missed)		(penalty scored) Comas; (penalty scored) Rojas; (penalty scored) Hauche; (penalty missed) Otálvaro; (penalty scored) J. Benítez

2 October 2024	Sportivo Ameliano	1–1 (3–4 p)	Guaraní	Villa Elisa
17:00 UTC−4	Torales 62'	Report	Prieto 68'	Stadium: Luis Alfonso Giagni; Referee: Alipio Colmán
	Penalties
	Bogado (penalty scored); Patiño (penalty missed); Paredes (penalty scored); Martinich (penalty scored); Samudio (penalty missed)		(penalty scored) Servio; (penalty missed) Manzur; (penalty scored) Alcaraz; (penalty scored) Barrientos; (penalty scored) González

2 October 2024	Encarnación	0–2	Libertad	Villa Hayes
19:30 UTC−4		Report	Aguilar 64'; Santa Cruz 76'	Stadium: Facundo de León Fosatti; Referee: Derlis Benítez

8 October 2024	Olimpia	2–0	Atlético 3 de Febrero	Villa Elisa
20:00 UTC−3	Gómez 62'; Parzajuk 75'	Report		Stadium: Luis Alfonso Giagni; Referee: Alipio Colmán

9 October 2024	Nacional	2–1	2 de Mayo	Asunción
17:30 UTC−3	T. Caballero 21'; Franco 62'	Report	Cáceres 90+2'	Stadium: Martín Torres; Referee: Aldo Quiñónez

9 October 2024	Cerro Porteño	1–2	Sol de América	Asunción
20:00 UTC−3	Churín 22'	Report	Ruiz Díaz 3'; Cabrera 66'	Stadium: Rogelio Livieres; Referee: Derlis Benítez

16 October 2024	24 de Setiembre	0–1	Guaireña	Capiatá
17:00 UTC−3		Report	É. González 27' (pen.)	Stadium: Erico Galeano; Referee: Édgar Galeano

== Quarter-finals ==
The fixture for this stage was announced on 18 October 2024 and matches in this round were played from 24 to 30 October 2024.

24 October 2024	Sportivo Luqueño	1–0	Guaireña	Villa Elisa
17:30 UTC−3	Benítez 28'	Report		Stadium: Luis Alfonso Giagni; Referee: Derlis Benítez

24 October 2024	Guaraní	1–0	Sportivo Carapeguá	Luque
20:00 UTC−3	González 44'	Report		Stadium: CONMEBOL; Referee: Aldo Quiñónez

30 October 2024	Sol de América	0–0 (2–4 p)	Libertad	Luque
20:00 UTC−3		Report		Stadium: CONMEBOL; Referee: David Ojeda
	Penalties
	Cabrera (penalty scored); Jara (penalty scored); Medina (penalty missed); González (penalty missed)		(penalty scored) Sanabria; (penalty scored) Franco; (penalty scored) Aguilar; (penalty missed) Lezcano; (penalty scored) Ó. Cardozo

30 October 2024	Olimpia	0–2	Nacional	Asunción
20:00 UTC−3		Report	T. Caballero 57'; Franco 82'	Stadium: Defensores del Chaco; Referee: Mario Díaz de Vivar

== Semi-finals ==
The fixture for this stage was announced on 8 November 2024 and matches in this round were played on 13 and 20 November 2024.

13 November 2024	Libertad	2–0	Sportivo Luqueño	Asunción
19:30 UTC−3	Lezcano 6'; Santa Cruz 90+2'	Report		Stadium: Rogelio Livieres; Referee: David Ojeda

20 November 2024	Nacional	2–1	Guaraní	Asunción
19:30 UTC−3	Bailone 13' (pen.); Gaona Lugo 44'	Report	Servio 42' (pen.)	Stadium: Defensores del Chaco; Referee: Derlis López

== Third place play-off ==
3 December 2024
19:30 UTC−3

Sportivo Luqueño	0–0	Guaraní
	Report
Penalties
Vera (penalty scored); Hauche (penalty scored); Brizuela (penalty scored); Giménez (penalty scored); Villalba (penalty scored)	5–4	(penalty scored) Servio; (penalty missed) Ibarrola; (penalty scored) Marín; (penalty scored) A. Benítez; (penalty scored) Pereira

Estadio Arsenio Erico, Asunción
Referee: Aldo Quiñónez

== Final ==
6 December 2024
19:30 UTC−3

Libertad	1–0	Nacional
Lezcano 55'	Report

Estadio Defensores del Chaco, Asunción
Referee: Juan Benítez

== See also ==
- 2024 Paraguayan Primera División season
- 2024 Paraguayan División Intermedia
