= 2025 APF División Intermedia =

División Intermedia
- Season: 2025
- Dates: 28 March – 5 October 2025
- Champions: Rubio Ñu (8th title)
- Promoted: Rubio Ñu; San Lorenzo
- Relegated: River Plate; Pastoreo; Guaraní (F)
- Matches: 240
- Goals: 570 (2.38 per match)
- Top goalscorer: Willian Riquelme (17 goals)
- Biggest home win: Spvo. Carapeguá 4–0 Dep. Santaní (25 May); River Plate 4–0 Sol de América (31 May); Rubio Ñu 4–0 Tacuary (29 June); San Lorenzo 4–0 Spvo. Carapeguá (11 August); Rubio Ñu 4–0 Encarnación (18 August)
- Biggest away win: Tacuary 0–4 Deportivo Capiatá (13 April); Spvo. Carapeguá 1–5 Sol de América (28 July); Resistencia 1–5 Pastoreo (21 September); 12 de Junio 0–4 Sol de América (29 September)
- Highest scoring: Resistencia 3–4 Rubio Ñu (20 June); Guaireña 5–2 Fdo. de la Mora (5 July); Guaraní (F) 3–4 Encarnación (30 August)

The 2025 División Intermedia season was the 107th season of the second-tier league of Paraguayan football and the 28th under the División Intermedia name. The season began on 28 March and ended on 5 October 2025, and the fixtures for the season were drawn on 9 December 2024.

Rubio Ñu became the first team promoted to the Paraguayan Primera División for the following season, clinching promotion with three matches to go after defeating Sportivo Carapeguá 1–0 on 14 September. They eventually secured the championship and their eighth title in the second tier the following week, after a scoreless draw with Guaireña. The runners-up San Lorenzo were the second and last promoted team, confirming their promotion on the last matchday of the season following a 3–0 win over Fernando de la Mora and a draw for Deportivo Capiatá against Sportivo Carapeguá.

River Plate, Pastoreo, and Guaraní de Fram were relegated to the third tier leagues at the end of the season.

== Format ==
Sixteen teams took part in the competition, which was played under a double round-robin system with teams playing each other twice, once at home and once away for a total of 30 matches. The top two teams at the end of the season were promoted to the Paraguayan Primera División for the 2026 season, while the bottom three teams in the relegation table at the end of the season were relegated: teams from Asunción or located within 50 kilometres of Asunción were relegated to Primera División B, while teams from outside Greater Asunción and the Central Department were relegated to Primera División B Nacional.

== Teams ==
=== Team changes ===
16 teams competed in the season: 11 teams from the previous División Intermedia season plus the two teams relegated from Primera División in its 2024 season (Sol de América and Tacuary), the 2024 Primera B Metropolitana champions Deportivo Capiatá and runners-up River Plate, and the 2024 Primera B Nacional champions Guaraní de Fram, who took part in the second tier of Paraguayan football for the first time ever.

Promoted to 2025 Primera División	Relegated from 2024 Primera División	Promoted from 2024 Tercera División	Relegated to 2025 Tercera División
Deportivo Recoleta; Tembetary	Sol de América; Tacuary	Deportivo Capiatá (Primera B Metropolitana); River Plate (Primera B Metropolitana); Guaraní (F) (Primera B Nacional)	Martín Ledesma (Primera B Metropolitana); Atlético 3 de Febrero (Primera B Nacional); Atlético Colegiales (Primera B Metropolitana)

=== Stadia and locations ===
Locations of the 2025 División Intermedia teams

Team	City	Stadium	Capacity
12 de Junio	Villa Hayes	Facundo de León	5,000
Deportivo Capiatá	Capiatá	Erico Galeano (Note: Deportivo Capiatá played some home matches at Estadio Enrique Soler in Capiatá since Estadio Erico Galeano was closed for refurbishment works.)	10,000
Deportivo Santaní	San Estanislao	Juan José Vázquez	8,000
Encarnación	Encarnación	Villa Alegre	16,000
Fernando de la Mora	Asunción	Emiliano Ghezzi	6,000
Guaireña	Villarrica	Parque del Guairá	11,000
Guaraní (F)	Encarnación	Villa Alegre (Note: Used as home stadium for the season since Guaraní (F)'s stadium Estadio Municipal in Fram did not meet APF requirements.)	16,000
Independiente (CG)	Asunción	Ricardo Gregor	4,000
Pastoreo	Juan Manuel Frutos	Liga Caaguazú de Fútbol	5,000
Resistencia	Asunción	Tomás Beggan Correa	3,500
River Plate	Asunción	Jardines del Kelito	6,500
Rubio Ñu	Asunción	La Arboleda	8,000
San Lorenzo	San Lorenzo	Gunther Vogel	5,000
Sol de América	Villa Elisa	Luis Alfonso Giagni	11,000
Sportivo Carapeguá	Carapeguá	Municipal de Carapeguá	10,000
Tacuary	Asunción	Toribio Vargas	3,000

== Standings ==
Pos	Team	Pld	W	D	L	GF	GA	GD	Pts	Qualification
1	Rubio Ñu (C, P)	30	17	9	4	46	21	+25	60	Promotion to Primera División
2	San Lorenzo (P)	30	15	8	7	38	22	+16	53	Promotion to Primera División
3	Deportivo Capiatá	30	14	10	6	37	21	+16	52	
4	12 de Junio	30	12	12	6	36	26	+10	48	
5	Pastoreo	30	10	11	9	34	31	+3	41	
6	Resistencia	30	9	13	8	46	50	−4	40	
7	Guaireña	30	11	6	13	41	38	+3	39	
8	Sol de América	30	9	11	10	34	35	−1	38 (Note: Head-to-head points: Sol de América 4, Tacuary 1.)	
9	Tacuary	30	10	8	12	28	36	−8	38	
10	River Plate	30	8	13	9	35	39	−4	37	
11	Encarnación	30	8	11	11	33	42	−9	35 (Note: Head-to-head points: Encarnación 4, Deportivo Santaní 1.)	
12	Deportivo Santaní	30	8	11	11	33	35	−2	35	
13	Sportivo Carapeguá	30	7	13	10	39	46	−7	34	
14	Independiente (CG)	30	9	7	14	32	40	−8	34	
15	Fernando de la Mora	30	6	10	14	24	40	−16	28	
16	Guaraní (F)	30	5	11	14	35	49	−14	26	

Source: APF, Soccerway
Rules for classification: 1) Points, 2) Head-to-head points, 3) Head-to-head goal difference, 4) Overall goal difference, 5) Goals for, 6) Playoff game (if needed to decide championship between two teams) or Drawing of lots (if three teams or more are tied).
(C) Champions; (P) Promoted

== Results ==
Home \ Away	12J	CAP	SAN	ENC	FDM	GUA	GFR	IND	PAS	RES	RIV	RUB	SSL	SOL	SPC	TAC
12 de Junio	—	1–0	0–0	3–0	2–1	2–0	1–2	1–0	1–1	2–2	2–2	2–0	1–1	0–4	0–0	1–3
Deportivo Capiatá	1–0	—	1–2	2–1	2–1	1–0	3–2	1–2	3–0	1–0	0–1	0–0	0–0	2–0	1–1	0–0
Deportivo Santaní	0–1	1–1	—	1–1	2–0	0–2	1–1	2–1	0–0	1–1	3–1	0–0	0–1	2–1	4–1	0–1
Encarnación	0–3	1–2	1–0	—	1–1	3–0	1–1	3–0	1–0	1–1	1–1	1–0	0–0	0–0	0–0	3–1
Fernando de la Mora	0–0	0–0	0–3	1–1	—	0–1	1–0	2–1	1–1	1–1	1–2	0–1	0–3	2–2	3–2	2–1
Guaireña	0–1	0–1	2–2	3–1	5–2	—	3–1	4–2	1–1	1–2	0–1	0–0	0–2	2–0	1–1	1–0
Guaraní (F)	0–3	0–2	4–1	3–4	1–1	3–2	—	0–1	3–3	1–2	2–2	2–1	1–2	0–2	1–0	1–1
Independiente (CG)	0–0	1–2	1–1	1–0	3–0	0–0	2–0	—	2–0	1–2	1–1	0–2	1–1	2–0	3–3	0–1
Pastoreo	1–1	1–0	2–1	1–1	2–0	1–0	2–1	1–2	—	3–1	2–0	1–4	0–2	0–1	3–1	0–0
Resistencia	1–1	1–1	3–3	2–2	1–0	1–0	1–1	3–1	1–5	—	1–1	3–4	2–1	3–2	1–1	3–2
River Plate	2–1	1–1	0–0	4–1	0–3	2–4	0–0	2–0	0–0	3–3	—	1–1	1–1	4–0	0–2	1–0
Rubio Ñu	2–2	1–0	1–0	4–0	1–0	2–1	1–1	3–0	1–0	4–1	1–1	—	2–1	2–1	1–0	4–0
San Lorenzo	1–2	0–2	1–0	1–2	1–0	2–1	2–1	3–1	1–0	1–0	3–0	0–1	—	0–0	4–0	1–0
Sol de América	0–1	1–1	2–1	3–1	0–0	1–3	0–0	0–2	1–1	1–1	1–0	0–0	1–1	—	2–1	2–1
Sportivo Carapeguá	1–0	2–2	4–0	2–1	0–0	3–3	1–1	1–1	0–2	2–1	3–1	1–1	2–0	1–5	—	2–2
Tacuary	1–1	0–4	0–2	1–0	0–1	0–1	3–1	1–0	0–0	2–1	1–0	2–1	1–1	1–1	2–1	—

Source: APF, Soccerway
Legend: Blue = home team win; Yellow = draw; Red = away team win.

== Top scorers ==
Rank	Player	Club	Goals
1	(Paraguay) Willian Riquelme	Guaireña	17
2	(Paraguay) Sergio Dietze	Independiente (CG)	11
2	(Paraguay) César Villagra	Rubio Ñu	11
4	(Paraguay) Rodrigo Vera	Resistencia	10
5	(Paraguay) Santiago Salcedo	12 de Junio	9
5	(Paraguay) Cristhian Medina	San Lorenzo	9
7	(Paraguay) Daniel Fernández	12 de Junio	8
7	(Paraguay) Santiago Santacruz	Deportivo Capiatá	8
7	(Paraguay) Jeferson Torales	Sportivo Carapeguá	8
10	(Paraguay) Florencio Yudis	Encarnación	7
10	(Paraguay) Fernando Viveros	Guaraní (F)	7
10	(Paraguay) Ángelo Cabrera	Sportivo Carapeguá	7
10	(Paraguay) Julio Rivarola	Sol de América	7

Source: APF

== Relegation ==
Relegation is determined at the end of the season by computing an average of the total of points earned per game over the past three seasons. The three teams with the lowest average were relegated to Primera División B or Primera División B Nacional for the following season, depending on their geographical location.

Pos	Team	2023 Pts	2024 Pts	2025 Pts	Total Pts	Total Pld	Avg	Relegation
1	Deportivo Capiatá	—	—	54	54	30	1.8	
2	Rubio Ñu	44	42	60	146	90	1.622	
3	San Lorenzo	42	46	53	141	90	1.567	
4	Sportivo Carapeguá	43	58	33	134	90	1.489	
5	12 de Junio	—	38	48	86	60	1.433	
6	Resistencia	—	45	40	85	60	1.417	
7	Independiente (CG)	51	38	34	123	90	1.367	
8	Deportivo Santaní	44	42	35	121	90	1.344	
9	Encarnación	—	44	35	79	60	1.317	
10	Guaireña	—	38	39	77	60	1.283	
11	Sol de América	—	—	38	38	30	1.267	
12	Tacuary	—	—	38	38	30	1.267	
13	Fernando de la Mora	48	35	28	111	90	1.233 (Note: Fernando de la Mora ahead of River Plate on head-to-head goal difference: Fernando de la Mora 1–2 River Plate, River Plate 0–3 Fernando de la Mora.)	
14	River Plate (R)	—	—	37	37	30	1.233	Relegation to Primera B Metropolitana
15	Pastoreo (R)	43	23	41	107	90	1.189	Relegation to Primera B Nacional
16	Guaraní (F) (R)	—	—	26	26	30	0.867	Relegation to Primera B Nacional

Source: APF

== See also ==
- 2025 Paraguayan Primera División season
- 2025 Copa Paraguay
