= 2024 APF División Intermedia =

División Intermedia
- Season: 2024
- Dates: 5 April – 14 October 2024
- Champions: Deportivo Recoleta (2nd title)
- Promoted: Deportivo Recoleta; Tembetary
- Relegated: Martín Ledesma; 3 de Febrero; Atlético Colegiales
- Matches: 240
- Goals: 567 (2.36 per match)
- Top goalscorer: Lucas González (21 goals)
- Biggest home win: Dep. Recoleta 6–0 Dep. Santaní (15 April)
- Biggest away win: Martín Ledesma 0–4 Tembetary (26 May); Resistencia 0–4 12 de Junio (20 July)
- Highest scoring: Martín Ledesma 4–4 Rubio Ñu (21 June)

The 2024 División Intermedia season, named "Homenaje a Daniel Giménez, Félix Quiñonez e Isidoro Benítez", was the 106th season of the second-tier league of Paraguayan football and the 27th under the División Intermedia name. The season began on 5 April and ended on 14 October 2024, and the fixtures for the season were drawn on 28 November 2023.

Deportivo Recoleta and Tembetary earned promotion to the Paraguayan Primera División at the end of the season, with the former clinching a top two finish with three matchdays to go by defeating Pastoreo on 22 September, and the latter doing so on the following matchday, beating Fernando de la Mora on 29 September. Deportivo Recoleta ended up winning their second División Intermedia title after a 1–1 with Fernando de la Mora and a 3–1 loss for Tembetary against Sportivo Carapeguá on the final matchday of the season.

== Format ==
16 teams took part in the competition, which was played under a double round-robin system with teams playing each other twice, once at home and once away for a total of 30 matches. The top two teams at the end of the season were promoted to the Paraguayan Primera División for the 2025 season, while the bottom three teams in the relegation table at the end of the season were relegated: teams located within 50 kilometres of Asunción were relegated to Primera División B, while teams from outside Greater Asunción and the Central Department were relegated to Primera División B Nacional.

== Teams ==
=== Team changes ===
16 teams competed in the season: 11 teams from the previous División Intermedia season plus the two teams relegated from Primera División in its 2023 season (Guaireña and Resistencia), the 2023 Primera División B champions Tembetary, the 2023 Primera División B Nacional champions 12 de Junio, and the 2022–23 Campeonato Nacional de Interligas champions Encarnación.

Promoted to 2024 Primera División	Relegated from 2023 Primera División	Promoted from 2023 Tercera División	Relegated to 2024 Tercera División
Sol de América; 2 de Mayo	Guaireña; Resistencia	12 de Junio (Primera B Nacional); Encarnación (Campeonato Nacional de Interligas); Tembetary (Primera B Metropolitana)	Atyrá (Primera B Nacional); 24 de Setiembre (Primera B Metropolitana); 12 de Octubre (Primera B Metropolitana)

=== Stadia and locations ===
Locations of the 2024 División Intermedia teams

Team	City	Stadium	Capacity
3 de Febrero	Ciudad del Este	Antonio Aranda	23,500
12 de Junio	Villa Hayes	Facundo de León	6,000
Atlético Colegiales	Lambaré	Luciano Zacarías	4,500
Deportivo Recoleta	Asunción	CARDIF	1,800
Deportivo Santaní	San Estanislao	Juan José Vázquez	8,000
Encarnación	Encarnación	Villa Alegre	16,000
Fernando de la Mora	Asunción	Emiliano Ghezzi	6,000
Guaireña	Villarrica	Parque del Guairá	11,000
Independiente (CG)	Asunción	Ricardo Gregor	4,000
Martín Ledesma	Capiatá	Enrique Soler	5,000
Pastoreo	Juan Manuel Frutos	Liga Caaguazú de Fútbol	5,000
Resistencia	Asunción	Tomás Beggan Correa	3,500
Rubio Ñu	Asunción	La Arboleda	8,000
San Lorenzo	San Lorenzo	Gunther Vogel	5,000
Sportivo Carapeguá	Carapeguá	Municipal de Carapeguá	10,000
Tembetary	Villa Elisa	Luis Alfonso Giagni (Note: Used as home stadium for the season since Tembetary's stadium Complejo Tembetary in Villa Elisa did not meet APF requirements.)	11,000

== Standings ==
Pos	Team	Pld	W	D	L	GF	GA	GD	Pts	Qualification
1	Deportivo Recoleta (C, P)	30	19	8	3	57	20	+37	65	Promotion to Primera División
2	Tembetary (P)	30	19	5	6	46	24	+22	62	Promotion to Primera División
3	Sportivo Carapeguá	30	17	7	6	45	27	+18	58	
4	San Lorenzo	30	12	10	8	35	31	+4	46	
5	Resistencia	30	13	6	11	35	35	0	45	
6	Encarnación	30	12	8	10	43	39	+4	44	
7	Rubio Ñu	30	11	9	10	33	35	−2	42 (Note: Head-to-head points: Rubio Ñu 6, Deportivo Santaní 0.)	
8	Deportivo Santaní	30	11	9	10	35	33	+2	42	
9	Guaireña (Note: Guaireña were deducted three points as punishment for failing to pay a debt with player Enrique Borja.)	30	10	11	9	30	25	+5	38 (Note: Head-to-head points: Guaireña 7, Independiente (CG) 5, 12 de Junio 4.)	
10	Independiente (CG)	30	10	8	12	33	37	−4	38	
11	12 de Junio	30	10	8	12	35	35	0	38	
12	Martín Ledesma	30	8	12	10	28	35	−7	36	
13	Fernando de la Mora	30	8	11	11	31	33	−2	35	
14	3 de Febrero	30	6	11	13	24	37	−13	29	
15	Pastoreo	30	6	5	19	28	50	−22	23	
16	Atlético Colegiales	30	2	4	24	28	70	−42	10	

Source: APF, Soccerway
Rules for classification: 1) Points, 2) Head-to-head points, 3) Head-to-head goal difference, 4) Overall goal difference, 5) Goals for, 6) Playoff game (if needed to decide championship between two teams) or Drawing of lots (if three teams or more are tied).
(C) Champions; (P) Promoted

== Results ==
Home \ Away	3FE	12J	CAC	REC	SAN	ENC	FDM	GUA	IND	MAL	PAS	RES	RUB	SSL	SPC	TEM
3 de Febrero	—	1–1	1–0	1–1	0–3	1–2	2–1	0–0	1–1	1–1	1–1	0–0	1–2	2–3	0–3	0–2
12 de Junio	2–0	—	4–1	2–1	0–1	2–1	1–1	2–0	0–0	0–1	2–2	1–3	0–0	1–1	1–2	1–3
Atlético Colegiales	2–3	2–3	—	2–4	1–1	1–2	1–1	0–1	0–3	1–1	1–4	0–1	0–1	1–3	4–1	0–1
Deportivo Recoleta	1–0	2–0	4–2	—	6–0	2–1	1–1	1–0	3–0	4–0	3–0	2–0	2–0	4–2	2–0	1–1
Deportivo Santaní	1–0	0–2	2–0	0–0	—	1–0	2–2	2–2	1–0	1–1	3–1	1–1	0–1	1–0	0–1	1–0
Encarnación	0–0	2–0	5–1	0–1	3–2	—	4–1	2–1	2–2	0–0	2–0	0–1	0–0	0–0	0–0	2–1
Fernando de la Mora	2–1	2–0	5–0	2–1	0–0	1–0	—	1–2	0–2	1–1	1–0	0–1	0–1	0–0	0–0	1–1
Guaireña	1–2	1–0	3–0	2–1	1–1	2–3	0–1	—	2–1	1–1	2–1	0–0	2–0	0–0	1–1	0–0
Independiente (CG)	2–1	1–0	1–1	0–1	1–0	3–1	2–0	2–2	—	1–3	0–2	2–1	1–1	1–0	0–1	2–5
Martín Ledesma	0–0	1–1	2–0	0–0	0–0	1–2	1–0	0–2	2–0	—	1–0	1–2	4–4	0–1	0–0	0–4
Pastoreo	0–2	3–1	1–0	0–2	0–3	1–3	2–2	1–0	2–1	0–1	—	0–1	0–1	0–0	1–3	1–1
Resistencia	0–0	0–4	2–0	1–3	1–3	5–1	2–0	1–0	1–1	1–2	3–2	—	2–1	1–0	1–2	0–2
Rubio Ñu	0–0	1–2	3–2	2–2	2–1	1–1	0–3	1–0	0–0	3–1	2–1	3–1	—	0–1	0–1	0–2
San Lorenzo	1–0	0–1	3–0	0–0	3–2	2–2	2–2	0–0	1–2	2–1	3–1	1–1	3–2	—	1–0	1–0
Sportivo Carapeguá	2–3	1–1	4–3	1–2	1–0	4–1	1–0	0–0	1–0	1–0	3–1	2–1	1–1	4–0	—	3–1
Tembetary	2–0	1–0	0–2	0–0	3–2	2–1	2–0	0–2	2–1	2–1	2–0	1–0	1–0	2–1	2–1	—

Source: APF, Soccerway
Legend: Blue = home team win; Yellow = draw; Red = away team win.

== Top scorers ==
Rank	Player	Club	Goals
1	(Paraguay) Lucas González	Deportivo Recoleta	21
2	(Paraguay) César Villagra	Rubio Ñu	12
2	(Paraguay) Richart Ortiz	Encarnación	12
4	(Paraguay) Augusto Giménez	Sportivo Carapeguá	11
5	(Paraguay) Roland Escobar	Deportivo Santaní	10
5	(Paraguay) Luis Galeano	Fernando de la Mora	10
7	(Paraguay) Fernando Escobar	Resistencia / Encarnación	9
7	(Paraguay) Carlos Duarte	Guaireña	9
9	(Paraguay) Juan Roa	Tembetary	8
10	(Paraguay) Jesús Cáceres	Guaireña / Sportivo Carapeguá	7
10	(Paraguay) Jesús Amarilla	3 de Febrero	7

Source: APF

== Relegation ==
Relegation was determined at the end of the season by computing an average of the total of points earned per game over the past three seasons. The three teams with the lowest average were relegated to Primera División B or Primera División B Nacional for the following season, depending on their geographical location.

Pos	Team	2022 Pts	2023 Pts	2024 Pts	Total Pts	Total Pld	Avg	Relegation
1	Tembetary	—	—	62	62	30	2.067	
2	Deportivo Recoleta	—	51	65	116	60	1.933	
3	Sportivo Carapeguá	—	43	58	101	60	1.683	
4	San Lorenzo	54	42	46	142	90	1.578	
5	Resistencia	—	—	45	45	30	1.5	
6	Independiente (CG)	41	51	41	133	90	1.478	
7	Encarnación	—	—	44	44	30	1.467	
8	Fernando de la Mora	48	48	35	131	90	1.456	
9	Rubio Ñu	44	44	42	130	90	1.444	
10	Deportivo Santaní	33	44	42	119	90	1.322	
11	Pastoreo	53	43	23	119	90	1.322	
12	Guaireña	—	—	38	38	30	1.267	
13	12 de Junio	—	—	38	38	30	1.267	
14	Martín Ledesma (R)	45	31	36	112	90	1.244	Relegation to Primera B Metropolitana
15	3 de Febrero (R)	35	39	29	103	90	1.144	Relegation to Primera B Nacional
16	Atlético Colegiales (R)	36	32	10	78	90	0.867	Relegation to Primera B Metropolitana

Source: APF

== See also ==
- 2024 Paraguayan Primera División season
- 2024 Copa Paraguay
