= 2024 Paraguayan Primera B Nacional =

Primera B Nacional
- Season: 2024
- Dates: 17 August 2024 – 18 January 2025
- Champions: Guaraní (Fram) (1st title)
- Promoted: Guaraní (Fram)
- Matches: 113
- Goals: 278 (2.46 per match)

The 2024 Paraguayan Primera División B Nacional, known locally as Campeonato de la Primera División B Nacional 2024, was the thirteenth season of the Paraguayan Primera División B Nacional, one of the three leagues of Paraguay's Tercera División, the third-tier of the country's football league system, in which clubs and teams from the leagues of the interior of the country compete. The tournament began on 17 August 2024 and ended on 18 January 2025.

Guaraní de Fram won their first Primera B Nacional title in this tournament, defeating CEFFCA on penalties in the final. As champions of this edition, Guaraní (Fram) were granted a direct spot in the 2025 División Intermedia.

== Teams ==
=== Locations ===
Most of the participating teams came from the departments of Canindeyú, Alto Paraná and Itapúa, with three sides each. The remaining teams were from San Pedro, Amambay, Guairá, Cordillera and Ñeembucú.

Department	Quantity	Teams
Canindeyú	3	CEFFCA, Nacional SDG, Salto del Guairá
Alto Paraná	3	Patriotas, Independiente FC, R.I. 3 Corrales
Itapúa	3	Deportivo Itapuense, Guaraní (Fram), Sportivo San Pedro
Cordillera	1	12 de Junio
Amambay	1	América
Guairá	1	Olimpia (Villarrica)
Ñeembucú	1	Deportivo Unión
San Pedro	1	Choré Central

=== Clubs information ===
Fourteen clubs took part in this Primera B Nacional season. Five of them took part in the tournament for the first time: Deportivo Unión from Pilar, Independiente from Hernandarias, Olimpia from Villarrica, América from Pedro Juan Caballero, and 12 de Junio from Caacupé.

Team	City	Stadium	Capacity	Foundation
12 de Junio	Caacupé	Coronel Manuel Cabañas	1,000	12 June 1936
América	Pedro Juan Caballero	Río Parapiti	25,000	20 April 1981
CEFFCA	Salto del Guairá	Nivaldo Suárez	2,000	18 April 2013
Choré Central	Choré	Asteria Mendoza	4,000	19 January 1965
Deportivo Itapuense	Encarnación	Villa Alegre	16,000	19 March 2019
Deportivo Unión	Pilar	Contralmirante Ramón Martino	2,000	8 December 1985
Guaraní (Fram)	Fram	Carlos Memmel	6,000	27 November 1949
Independiente FC	Hernandarias	Independiente de Hernandarias		24 April 1983
Nacional SDG	Salto del Guairá	Ary Arthur Méndez	2,000	2 February 1975
Olimpia (Villarrica)	Villarrica	Valeriano Villaverde	5,000	25 September 1931
Patriotas	Hernandarias	Próceres de Mayo	3,000	6 February 2021
R.I. 3 Corrales	Ciudad del Este	General Eduardo Torreani	3,000	29 September 1980
Salto del Guairá	Salto del Guairá	Emigdio Vallejos	2,000	5 July 1964
Sportivo San Pedro	San Pedro del Paraná	Joaquín de Alós	2,000	15 December 1940

== First stage ==
=== Group A ===
Pos	Team	Pld	W	D	L	GF	GA	GD	Pts	Qualification
1	Nacional SDG	12	6	4	2	27	15	+12	22	Advance to Second stage
2	Guaraní (Fram)	12	4	6	2	17	10	+7	18	Advance to Second stage
3	Choré Central	12	4	5	3	21	15	+6	17	Advance to Second stage
4	R.I. 3 Corrales	12	3	6	3	14	16	−2	15	Advance to Second stage
5	12 de Junio	12	4	3	5	15	23	−8	15	
6	Olimpia (Villarrica)	12	3	5	4	15	14	+1	14	
7	Deportivo Unión	12	1	5	6	11	27	−16	8	

Source: UFI
Rules for classification: 1) Points, 2) Goal difference, 3) Goals for, 4) Drawing of lots.

=== Group B ===
Pos	Team	Pld	W	D	L	GF	GA	GD	Pts	Qualification
1	Patriotas	12	7	3	2	21	6	+15	24	Advance to Second stage
2	Salto del Guairá	12	5	4	3	19	12	+7	19	Advance to Second stage
3	Deportivo Itapuense	12	5	4	3	11	12	−1	19	Advance to Second stage
4	CEFFCA	12	4	6	2	11	9	+2	18	Advance to Second stage
5	Independiente FC	12	4	4	4	17	14	+3	16	
6	Sportivo San Pedro	12	2	3	7	11	25	−14	9	
7	América	12	2	2	8	7	19	−12	8	

Source: UFI
Rules for classification: 1) Points, 2) Goal difference, 3) Goals for, 4) Drawing of lots.

== Second stage ==
In the second stage, the eight participating clubs were divided into two groups of four. The top two teams advanced to the semi-finals.

=== Group A ===
Pos	Team	Pld	W	D	L	GF	GA	GD	Pts	Qualification
1	CEFFCA	6	4	1	1	8	5	+3	13	Advance to Final stages
2	Salto del Guairá	6	3	2	1	8	3	+5	11	Advance to Final stages
3	Nacional SDG	6	1	2	3	6	8	−2	5	
4	Choré Central	6	1	1	4	6	12	−6	4	

Source: UFI
Rules for classification: 1) Points, 2) Goal difference, 3) Goals for, 4) Drawing of lots.

=== Group B ===
Pos	Team	Pld	W	D	L	GF	GA	GD	Pts	Qualification
1	Guaraní (Fram)	6	3	3	0	7	2	+5	12	Advance to Final stages
2	Patriotas	6	2	3	1	5	4	+1	9	Advance to Final stages
3	Deportivo Itapuense	6	2	1	3	4	6	−2	7	
4	R.I. 3 Corrales	6	1	1	4	4	8	−4	4	

Source: UFI
Rules for classification: 1) Points, 2) Goal difference, 3) Goals for, 4) Drawing of lots.

== Final stages ==
=== Bracket ===
Semi-finals
Salto del Guairá	0	0	0
Guaraní (Fram)	0	1	1
Patriotas	5	0	5 (3)
CEFFCA (p)	1	4	5 (4)

Final
Guaraní (Fram) (p)	1 (4)
CEFFCA	1 (3)

=== Semi-finals ===
Team 1	Agg.	Team 2	1st leg	2nd leg
Patriotas	5–5 (3–4 p)	CEFFCA	5–1	0–4
Salto del Guairá	0–1	Guaraní (Fram)	0–0	0–1

=== Final ===
18 January 2025
19:00 UTC−3

Guaraní (Fram)	1–1	CEFFCA
Giménez 1'	Report	Candia 70'
Penalties
	4–3

Estadio CARFEM, Ypané

== See also ==
- Paraguayan football league system
- 2024 Paraguayan Primera B Metropolitana
