= Nildo Viera =

Paraguayan footballer

Personal information
- Full name: Nildo Arturo Viera Recalde
- Date of birth: 20 March 1993 (age 33)
- Place of birth: San Lorenzo, Paraguay
- Height: 1.82 m (6 ft 0 in)
- Position: Forward

Team information
- Current team: Salto del Guairá
- Number: 28

Youth career
- Guaraní

Senior career*
Years	Team	Apps	(Gls)
2010–2016	Guaraní	23	(4)
2013	→ Sportivo Carapeguá (loan)	9	(0)
2014	→ Gimnasia CdU (loan)	8	(1)
2016–2019	River Plate Asunción	86	(29)
2019–2022	Sol de América	74	(13)
2022–2023	Guaireña	30	(9)
2023	Tacuary	10	(1)
2024	Independiente FBC	0	(0)
2024	Curicó Unido	7	(0)
2025	Encarnación	0	(0)
2025	Pastoreo	5	(0)
2025–	Salto del Guairá	–	(–)
- * Club domestic league appearances and goals as of 12 December 2024

Nildo Arturo Viera Recalde (born 20 March 1993) is a Paraguayan professional footballer who plays as a forward for Salto del Guairá.

== Career ==
Viera started his career with Guaraní and made his professional debut on 4 December 2010 in a Paraguayan Primera División match against Rubio Ñu. He had stints on loan with Sportivo Carapeguá in 2013 and the Argentine club Gimnasia y Esgrima de Concepción del Uruguay in 2014.

After ending his contract with Guaraní, Viera switched to River Plate de Asunción in 2016, with whom he took part in both the first and the second level of the Paraguayan football.

In the second half of 2019, Viera signed with Sol de América. In 2022, he switched to Guaireña.

After playing for Tacuary in 2023 and signing with Independiente FBC in February 2024, Viera moved to Chile and joined Curicó Unido in March 2024.

Back to Paraguay, Viera joined Encarnación in February 2025. In the same year, he played for Pastoreo and Salto del Guairá.
