= 2023 Paraguayan Primera B Nacional =

Primera División B Nacional
- Season: 2023
- Dates: 16 July - 4 November
- Champions: Club 12 de Junio
- Matches played: 119

The 2023 Paraguayan Primera División B Nacional, known locally as Campeonato de la Primera División B Nacional 2023, was the twelfth season of the Paraguayan Primera División B Nacional, one of the three leagues of Paraguay's Tercera División, the third-tier of the country's football league system, in which clubs and teams from the leagues of the interior of the country compete.

This edition gave half a place to the 2024 División Intermedia for the champion, who must play a promotion against the runner-up of the 2023 Primera B Metropolitana.

== Teams and locations ==
Locations of the 2023 Primera B Nacional teams

Club	Founded	District	Department
Cerro Porteño-Franco	August 12, 1967	Presidente Franco	Alto Paraná
R.I. 3 Corrales	September 29, 1980	Ciudad del Este	Alto Paraná
Sol del Este	January 26, 2009	Ciudad del Este	Alto Paraná
Paraná FC	February 6, 2012	Ciudad del Este	Alto Paraná
Ciudad Nueva	April 10, 1980	Ciudad del Este	Alto Paraná
Deportivo Minga Guazú	July 6, 1968	Minga Guazú	Alto Paraná
San Alfonso	December 7, 2019	Minga Guazú	Alto Paraná
Obreros Unidos	June 20, 1985	Hernandarias	Alto Paraná
Patriotas	February 20, 2022	Hernandarias	Alto Paraná
Ovetense FC	November 5, 2015	Coronel Oviedo	Caaguazú
Deportivo Caaguazú	September 16, 2008	Caaguazú	Caaguazú
Nacional de Salto	November 2, 1975	Salto del Guairá	Canindeyú
Salto del Guairá	July 5, 1964	Salto del Guairá	Canindeyú
Deportivo Itapuense	March 19, 2019	Encarnación	Itapúa
Guaraní-Trinidad	October 12, 1960	Trinidad	Itapúa
Guaraní-Fram	November 27, 1949	Fram	Itapúa
12 de Junio	June 12, 1936	Villa Hayes	Presidente Hayes
Choré Central	January 19, 1965	Choré	San Pedro

== First stage ==
They were divided into 3 groups of 6 teams each. The 2 best of each group and the 2 best third teams will advance to the second stage.

=== Group A ===
Pos	Team	Pld	W	D	L	GF	GA	GD	Pts	Qualification
1	Deportivo Itapuense	10	8	1	1	16	4	+12	25	Advance to Second stage
2	Salto del Guairá	10	6	2	2	14	5	+9	20	Advance to Second stage
3	Deportivo Caaguazú	10	5	2	3	14	10	+4	17	
4	Obreros Unidos	10	3	4	3	10	9	+1	13	
5	Paraná FC	10	1	2	7	10	30	−20	5	
6	San Alfonso	10	1	1	8	16	22	−6	4	

Source: UFI
Rules for classification: 1) Points, 2) Goal difference, 3) Goals for, 4) Drawing of lots.

=== Group B ===
Pos	Team	Pld	W	D	L	GF	GA	GD	Pts	Qualification
1	Patriotas	10	8	1	1	29	6	+23	25	Advance to Second stage
2	Ovetense	10	5	4	1	15	9	+6	19	Advance to Second stage
3	Nacional SDG	10	5	3	2	17	7	+10	18	Advance to Second stage
4	R.I. 3 Corrales	10	4	3	3	13	8	+5	15	
5	Cerro Porteño PRF	10	1	2	7	7	27	−20	5	
6	Guaraní TRI	10	0	1	9	2	26	−24	1	

Source: UFI
Rules for classification: 1) Points, 2) Goal difference, 3) Goals for, 4) Drawing of lots.

=== Group C ===
Pos	Team	Pld	W	D	L	GF	GA	GD	Pts	Qualification
1	12 de Junio	10	7	0	3	12	9	+3	21	Advance to Second stage
2	Guaraní FRA	10	6	1	3	22	15	+7	19	Advance to Second stage
3	Sol del Este	10	5	3	2	18	10	+8	18	Advance to Second stage
4	Deportivo Minga Guazú	10	4	3	3	16	9	+7	15	
5	Ciudad Nueva	10	3	3	4	13	15	−2	12	
6	Choré Central	10	0	0	10	4	24	−20	0	

Source: UFI
Rules for classification: 1) Points, 2) Goal difference, 3) Goals for, 4) Drawing of lots.

=== Ranking of third-placed teams ===
The two best third-placed teams from the three groups advance to the second stage along with the three group winners and three runners-up.

Pos	Grp	Team	Pld	W	D	L	GF	GA	GD	Pts	Qualification
1	B	Nacional SDG	10	5	3	2	17	7	+10	18	Advance to Second stage
2	C	Sol del Este	10	5	3	2	18	10	+8	18	Advance to Second stage
3	A	Deportivo Caaguazú	10	5	2	3	14	10	+4	17	

Source: UFI

== Second stage ==
The qualified teams were divided into 2 groups of 4 teams each. The best 2 of each group will qualify to the knockout stage.

=== Group A ===
Pos	Team	Pld	W	D	L	GF	GA	GD	Pts	Qualification
1	12 de Junio	6	3	2	1	8	2	+6	11	Advance to Final stage
2	Ovetense	6	3	2	1	6	5	+1	11	Advance to Final stage
3	Sol del Este	6	2	1	3	4	9	−5	7	
4	Deportivo Itapuense	6	1	1	4	4	6	−2	4	

Source: UFI
Rules for classification: 1) Points, 2) Goal difference, 3) Goals for, 4) Drawing of lots.

=== Group B ===
Pos	Team	Pld	W	D	L	GF	GA	GD	Pts	Qualification
1	Patriotas	6	3	2	1	7	5	+2	11	Advance to Final stage
2	Guaraní FRA	6	4	1	1	9	4	+5	13	Advance to Final stage
3	Nacional SDG	6	1	2	3	5	9	−4	5	
4	Salto del Guairá	6	1	1	4	6	9	−3	4	

Source: UFI
Rules for classification: 1) Points, 2) Goal difference, 3) Goals for, 4) Drawing of lots.

== Final stage ==
Semifinals
12 de Junio	2	2	4
Guaraní FRA	0	1	1
Patriotas	1	0	1
Ovetense	2	0	2

Finals
12 de Junio
Ovetense

== Promotion play-off ==
The champion played two-legged matches against the runner-up of the Primera B Metropolitana for a place in the División Intermedia.

22 November 2023
19:30

12 de Junio	0-0	Cristóbal Colón JAS
	Report

Defensores del Chaco
Referee: Carlos Paul Benítez
26 November 2023
18:00

Cristóbal Colón JAS	0-0	12 de Junio
	Report
Penalties
Luis Matto (penalty scored); Hugo Oviedo (penalty scored); Walter Núñez (penalty scored); Estiven Pérez (penalty scored); Diego Arias (penalty missed); Alex Ayala (penalty missed)	4–5	(penalty scored) Freddy Coronel; (penalty scored) Jesús Asta; (penalty scored) César Ayala; (penalty scored) Daniel Valdvinos; (penalty scored) Marcial Núñez; (penalty missed) Guillermo Beltrán

Defensores del Chaco
Referee: Juan Gabriel Benítez
