= Club 12 de Junio =

Paraguayan football club

- Nicknames: El Auriazul; León del Chaco
- Founded: 12 June 1936; 89 years ago
- Ground: Facundo de León; Villa Hayes, Paraguay
- Capacity: 2,000
- Chairman: Lorena Cabrera
- Manager: Arturo Villasanti
- League: División Intermedia
- 2025: División Intermedia, 4th of 16
Home colours	Away colours

Club 12 de Junio is a professional Paraguayan football club from Villa Hayes. The club was founded in 1936 and currently plays in División Intermedia, the second division in the Paraguayan football league system.

== History ==
The club was founded in 1936 after the Chaco War by some of Villa Hayes's prominent citizens and ex-combatants, including its first president, Vicente Garozzo Caruso. The Italian brought the blue and yellow kits of Boca Juniors from Argentina to the club. In 2022 Club 12 de Junio competed in the Primera División B Nacional for the first time. The club won its first match in the league 3–0 against San Alfonso. For to the 2023 season, the club announced high-profile signings including Guillermo Beltrán and Paulo da Silva. The club went on to become champions that season, its second in the league. In November 2023, Club 12 de Junio defeated Club Cristóbal Colón de Juan Augusto Saldívar on penalties in the promotion match to qualify for the División Intermedia for the 2024 season.

== Stadium ==
The club's home venue is the Estadio Facundo de León Fossatti. The stadium features LED lighting, team rooms, and perimeter fencing.
