= Julio Martínez (footballer, born 1982) =

Paraguayan footballer

Personal information
- Full name: Julio César Martínez Bobadilla
- Date of birth: 31 May 1982 (age 44)
- Place of birth: Zeballos Cué, Paraguay
- Height: 1.82 m (6 ft 0 in)
- Position: Forward

Youth career
- General Caballero ZC

Senior career*
Years	Team	Apps	(Gls)
1998–2000	General Caballero ZC		
2001	Sportivo Iteño		
2002	Pilcomayo FBC		
2003	Cerro Porteño	2	(0)
2003–2004	Sportivo Trinidense		
2004	General Caballero ZC		
2005	Deportes Antofagasta	13	(4)
2006–2007	2 de Mayo	56	(12)
2007	Deportes Tolima		
2008	Godoy Cruz	0	(0)
2008	3 de Febrero	6	(2)
2009	12 de Octubre	18	(5)
2010	Técnico Universitario		
2011	Sportivo Iteño		
2012	2 de Mayo		
2012	Choré Central	–	(–)
2013	Sol del Este	–	(–)
2014	Capitán Bado	–	(–)
2019	Sportivo Ribereño	–	(–)
- * Club domestic league appearances and goals

Julio César Martínez Bobadilla (born 31 May 1982 in Zeballos Cué, Paraguay) is a retired Paraguayan footballer who played as a forward.

== Teams ==
- (Paraguay) General Caballero ZC 1998–2000
- (Paraguay) Sportivo Iteño 2001
- (Paraguay) Pilcomayo FBC 2002
- (Paraguay) Cerro Porteño 2003
- (Paraguay) Sportivo Trinidense 2003–2004
- (Paraguay) General Caballero ZC 2004
- (Chile) Deportes Antofagasta 2005
- (Paraguay) 2 de Mayo 2006–2007
- (Colombia) Deportes Tolima 2007
- (Argentina) Godoy Cruz 2008
- (Paraguay) 3 de Febrero 2008
- (Paraguay) 12 de Octubre 2009
- (Ecuador) Técnico Universitario 2010
- (Paraguay) Sportivo Iteño 2011
- (Paraguay) 2 de Mayo 2012
- (Paraguay) Choré Central 2012
- (Paraguay) Sol del Este 2013
- (Paraguay) Capitán Bado 2014
- (Paraguay) Sportivo Ribereño 2019
