= Alan Olmedo =

Paraguayan footballer (born 1994)

Personal information
- Full name: Alan Olmedo
- Date of birth: 24 June 1993 (age 33)
- Place of birth: Itauguá, Paraguay
- Height: 1.84 m (6 ft 0 in)
- Position: Midfielder

Team information
- Current team: Cantolao
- Number: 6

Youth career
- 12 de Octubre

Senior career*
Years	Team	Apps	(Gls)
- 12 de Octubre
–2016	Olimpia de Itá		
2017	Fulgencio Yegros		
2018–2019	San Lorenzo		
2019	Atyrá FC		
2020	Chavelines	5	(0)
2021	Sportivo Iteño		
2022	2 de Mayo		
2023	Deportivo Santaní	27	(2)
2024	Encarnación	25	(2)
2025	San Lorenzo		
2025–	Cantolao	8	(1)
- * Club domestic league appearances and goals as of 15:02, 11 October 2025 (UTC)

Alan Olmedo (born 24 June 1994) is a Paraguayan footballer who plays as a midfielder for Peruvian Segunda División side Cantolao.

== Career ==
=== Club career ===
Having formerly played for 12 de Octubre Football Club, Olimpia de Itá and Club Fulgencio Yegros, Olmedo joined Club Sportivo San Lorenzo for the 2018 season, which he helped with promotion to the Paraguayan Primera División in his first season. He played eight Paraguayan Primera División games for San Lorenzo in the 2019 season. In August 2019, he then moved to Atyrá FC.

On 31 December 2019 Peruvian Segunda División side Chavelines Juniors confirmed, that Olmedo had joined the club. In January 2021, Olmedo returned to Paraguay and joined Sportivo Iteño. In 2022, Olmedo played for 2 de Mayo, while he moved to Deportivo Santaní ahead of the 2023 season.

Ahead of the 2024 season, Olmedo joined Encarnación FC. A year later, ahead of the 2025 season, Olmedo moved to San Lorenzo.

In July 2025, Olmedo joined Peruvian Segunda División side Cantolao.
