= Paulo da Silva =

Paraguayan footballer (born 1980)

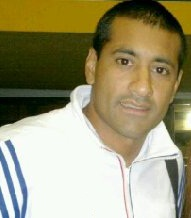
- Da Silva in 2011

Personal information
- Full name: Paulo César da Silva Barrios
- Date of birth: 1 February 1980 (age 46)
- Place of birth: Asunción, Paraguay
- Height: 1.84 m (6 ft 0 in)
- Position: Centre-back

Youth career
- Atlántida

Senior career*
Years	Team	Apps	(Gls)
1995	Atlántida	36	(0)
1996	Presidente Hayes		
1997	Sport Colombia (Note: Paulo da Silva played in at least 1 official match for Sport Colombia in 1997 Paraguayan Primera División season (Spanish article).)	1+	
1997–1998	Cerro Porteño	30	(1)
1998–1999	Perugia	2	(0)
1999–2000	Lanús	14	(1)
2000–2001	Venezia	7	(0)
2001	Cosenza	2	(0)
2002–2003	Libertad	30	(2)
2003–2009	Toluca	235	(20)
2009–2011	Sunderland	24	(0)
2011–2012	Zaragoza	42	(1)
2012–2015	Pachuca	33	(2)
2013–2015	→ Toluca (loan)	76	(12)
2015–2017	Toluca	72	(2)
2017–2021	Libertad	50	(0)
2021–2022	12 de Octubre	67	(2)
2023	Independiente	8	(0)
2023	12 de Junio (Note: Paulo da Silva played in 9 league matches for 12 de Junio in 2023 Paraguayan Primera B Nacional (Spanish article), based on posts from the official Instagram and Facebook accounts of Club 12 de Junio, from July to September 2023.)	9	(?)
2024	Atlántida (Note: Paulo da Silva played in 14 league matches for Atlántida in his second stint on the club.)	14	(0)

International career
1994–1997 (Note: Paulo da Silva made at least 7 appearances for Paraguay U17; seven appearances in the 1997 South American U-17 Championship, where he scored 1 goal, and was part of the ideal team of the tournament, and may have matches unaccounted for Paraguay U17, having played for Paraguay U17 since 1994.)	Paraguay U17	7+	(1)
1999 (Note: Paulo da Silva played in at least 31 matches for Paraguay's Under-X teams, where X is 17, 20 and 23, in which he scored 3 goals.)	Paraguay U20	14+	(2)
2000	Paraguay U23	9+	(0)
2000–2017	Paraguay	148	(3)

Managerial career
- 2024: Sol de América (assistant manager)
Medal record
Representing Paraguay
Copa América
Runner-up	2011 Argentina	Team
- * Club domestic league appearances and goals as of 07:54, 18 October 2024 (UTC)

Paulo César da Silva Barrios (born 1 February 1980) is a Paraguayan former professional international footballer who played as a centre-back. He is one of the players in football with most official appearances ever, with over 1,039 official appearances (the first Paraguayan to achieve the feat, since the time matches are recorded).

He played top-flight football in Mexico, Paraguay, Spain, England, Italy and Argentina, mostly in Mexico, where in 2015 became a naturalized Mexican citizen.

He played for the Paraguay national team from 2000 to 2017, and is their most-capped player of all time, earning over 100 caps, with the Paraguayan Football Association recognizing 150 caps, but FIFA 148. He played at two World Cups and four Copa América tournaments, helping his country finish as runners-up in the 2011 Copa América.

A player highly regarded, in December 2023, featured in a legends match organized by CONMEBOL. In addition, since 2024, he holds the world record for the longest gap between two spells for the same club; he returned to play for Atlántida in 2024, after a 29-year absence, as he first played in 1995.

== Club career ==
=== Early career ===
Born in Asunción, Da Silva started his career in the youth divisions of Atlántida Sport Club, arriving at the club at the age of 13. In 1996, da Silva reached the Primera División Paraguaya with Asunción team Presidente Hayes at the age of 16.

=== Mexico ===
Before joining Toluca, da Silva played for Perugia, Venezia and Cosenza of Italy, and Lanús of Argentina. He joined Toluca from Paraguayan Club Libertad for the 2003 Apertura. After making his debut, da Silva was a mainstay in Toluca's defence, starting all but one game that he has played and eventually becoming the team's captain due to his leadership on the field. In 2007, he was chosen for the "Ideal Eleven" squad of South America and in 2008 he led Toluca to the Apertura 2008 title, being chosen as the best overall player of the tournament by the Mexican media.

=== Sunderland ===
On 13 July 2009, Da Silva joined English club Sunderland on a three-year deal. Manager Steve Bruce said "I'm delighted to have signed a player of Paulo's experience. He is captain of his country and has played at the highest level in South America, so will bring leadership qualities to our side." His arrival at the Stadium of Light was followed by a long and confusing period in regards to his visa application. Da Silva was granted a work permit to play in England almost immediately, but had to wait for over a month to get his visa before it was eventually granted on 12 August.

He made his debut on 24 August against Norwich City in the League Cup second round, playing the whole 90 minutes of a 4–1 away win. On 12 September he made his first Premier League appearance, replacing Steed Malbranque for the final ten minutes of a 4–1 home win over Hull City.

Da Silva was rotated throughout his first season at the club, but performed consistently when required. Manager Steve Bruce cited 'settlement' as the reason behind playing Da Silva in phases, stating he needed time to adjust to the English game and lifestyle. He was joined at the club by his international teammate Cristian Riveros in May 2010. Da Silva's second season at Sunderland saw him make just three appearances, only one as a starter. His last appearance for Sunderland came in their home defeat to Notts County in the FA Cup on 8 January 2011.

=== Real Zaragoza ===
Da Silva joined Real Zaragoza from Sunderland on 31 January 2011 for an undisclosed fee, with his new club in 15th in La Liga at the time. They finished the season in 13th.

=== Toluca ===
Da Silva re-joined Toluca on 31 May 2013 in a two-year loan deal from Pachuca.

On 11 May 2015, Toluca announced they had signed da Silva permanently.

In December 2015, da Silva received a Mexican naturalization to disoccupy a foreign place in Toluca's team.

=== Return to Paraguay ===
On 26 June 2017, Da Silva returned to Paraguay to play for Club Libertad.

In March 2020, da Silva stated that he wanted to retire at Atlántida Asunción.

In December 2021, the 41-year-old da Silva announced that the 2022 season would be his last.

However, in 2023 he returned to playing for Independiente CG of 2023 Paraguayan División Intermedia first and later for 12 de Junio of 2023 Paraguayan Primera B Nacional. At the end of the season, da Silva was linked to becoming assistant manager next to Uruguayan Sergio Órteman and was announced as such for Sol de América, next to Humberto Ovelar, but, in 2024, he again returned to playing for Atlántida Sport Club in 2024 Primera División B, the club he commenced his career, where the 44-year-old da Silva announced it will be his last season playing. On 20 October 2024, after the final match of the season, Da Silva retired from playing.

== International career ==
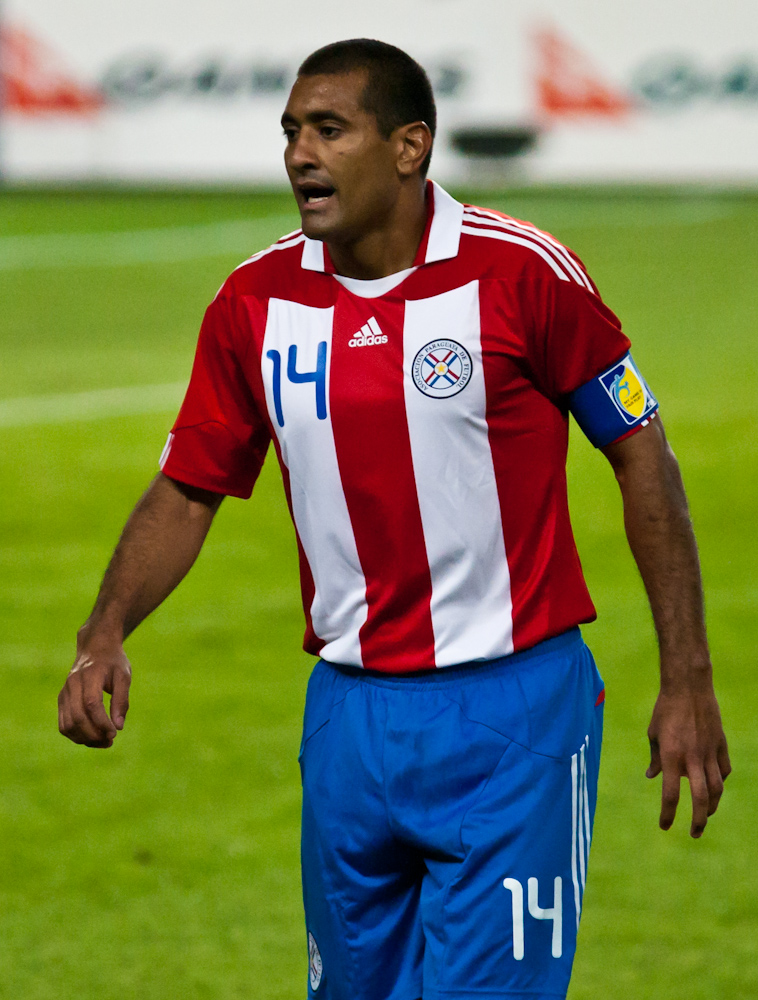
Da Silva during a friendly match against Australia in October 2010

In 1994, da Silva was selected for the Paraguay U17 national team barely aged 14.

In 2000, da Silva represented Paraguay U23 at the 2000 CONMEBOL Men Pre-Olympic Tournament.

He played for Paraguay in 1997 and 1999 FIFA World Youth Championship, but missed the 2002 World Cup in Korea and Japan. However, he was named in the 23-man squad for the 2006 World Cup in Germany. He also played at the 2010 World Cup in South Africa, featuring in all five of Paraguay's games in their run to the quarter-finals, and provided an assist for Sunderland teammate Cristian Riveros in their 2–0 win against Slovakia in the group stages.

== Managerial career ==
In 2023, at the end of the season, da Silva was linked to becoming assistant manager next to Uruguayan Sergio Órteman and was announced as such for Sol de América, next to Humberto Ovelar, but, in 2024, he again returned to playing for Atlántida Sport Club in 2024 Primera División B, the club he commenced his career, where the 44-year-old da Silva announced it will be his last season playing.

== Personal life ==
In December 2015, da Silva became a Mexican citizen.

In October 2017, da Silva helped found Asociación Mexicana de Futbolistas (Mexican Footballers Association).

== Career statistics ==
Scores and results list Paraguay's goal tally first, score column indicates score after each da Silva goal.

List of international goals scored by Paulo da Silva
No.	Date	Venue	Opponent	Score	Result	Competition
1	21 November 2007	Estadio Nacional Julio Martínez Prádanos, Santiago, Chile	Chile	2–0	3–0	2010 FIFA World Cup qualification
2	21 November 2007	Estadio Nacional Julio Martínez Prádanos, Santiago, Chile	Chile	3–0	3–0	2010 FIFA World Cup qualification
3	1 September 2016	Estadio Defensores del Chaco, Asunción, Paraguay	Chile	2–0	2–1	2018 FIFA World Cup qualification

== Honours ==
Libertad

- Primera División de Paraguay: 2002, 2003

Toluca

- Mexican Primera División: 2005 Apertura, 2008 Apertura
- Campeón de Campeones: 2003, 2006
- CONCACAF Champions' Cup: 2003

Individual

- Chosen on the CONMEBOL Best Eleven team: 2007
- Best player of the Primera División de México: 2008

== See also ==
- List of men's footballers with 100 or more international caps
- List of men's footballers with the most official appearances
