= Roberto Ovelar =

Paraguayan footballer (born 1985)

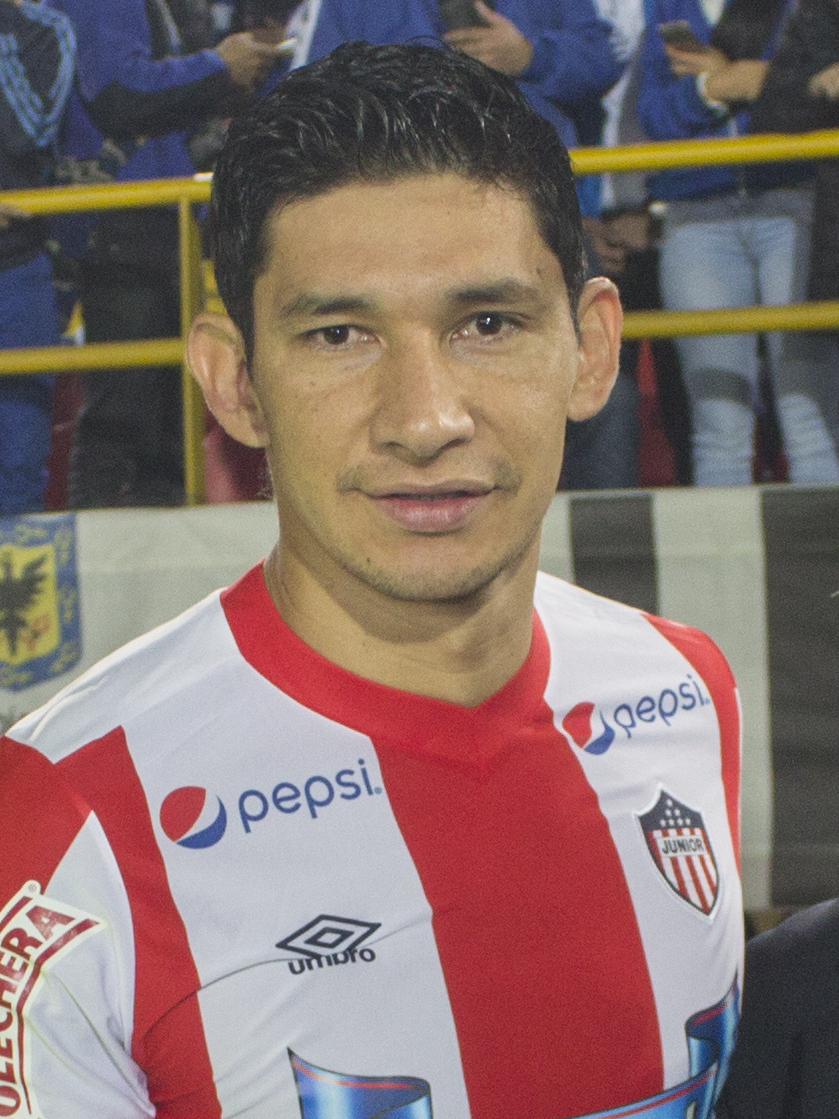
- Ovelar with Junior in 2015

Personal information
- Full name: Roberto Andrés Ovelar Maldonado
- Date of birth: 1 December 1985 (age 40)
- Place of birth: Curuguaty, Paraguay
- Height: 1.80 m (5 ft 11 in)
- Position: Forward

Senior career*
Years	Team	Apps	(Gls)
2006–2007	Cerro Porteño	32	(10)
2008	Universidad San Martín	26	(11)
2009	Cruz Azul	5	(1)
2009–2011	Alianza Lima	54	(24)
2012	Universidad Católica	15	(5)
2013–2014	Juan Aurich	38	(18)
2014–2017	Junior	107	(30)
2018–2019	Millonarios	42	(7)
2019	Olimpia	4	(0)
2020	Once Caldas	17	(6)
2021–2022	Deportivo Municipal	49	(18)
2023	General Caballero JLM	9	(0)
2024–2025	Patriotas	–	(–)
2025	3 de Febrero	–	(–)
Total		398	(130)

International career
2001	Paraguay U20	5	(0)

Managerial career
- 2025: Patriotas
- * Club domestic league appearances and goals

Roberto Andrés Ovelar Maldonado (born 1 December 1985) is a Paraguayan former footballer who played as a striker.

He began his football career at amateur club Karende, and was later scouted by Rogelio Rojas to play for Cerro Porteño, one of the most successful Paraguayan teams. His coach at the moment, Gustavo Costas, called him up for the 2006 season, when the team earned the Primera División. After the 2007 season, Ovelar was loaned to Peruvian side Universidad San Martín de Porres.

In June 2008, he returned to Cerro Porteño after a successful season in Peru, winning the Torneo Descentralizado. In January 2009, Ovelar joined Mexican side Cruz Azul. In June, he returned to Peru and joined Alianza Lima on loan, finalizing his transfer later that season. After several successful seasons at Alianza, he was sent to Chilean Primera División club Universidad Católica in December 2011, for a US$1.5 million fee.

Ovelar represented the Paraguayan national under-20 football team in 2001, aged 16, playing in five games but unable to score at the South American Youth Championship.

== Club career ==
=== Early career ===
Roberto Ovelar began his career with Paraguayan side Cerro Porteño, where he was able to play regularly and score 10 goals in the 2006-2007 season. In 2007, Ovelar signed on loan with Peru side San Martín de Porres at the age of 22. Ovelar made significant achievements during the 2007 Apertura and the 2008 Clausura of the Torneo Descentralizado.

=== Cruz Azul ===
Ovelar signed for Mexican side Cruz Azul for the Clausura 2009 tournament after his time in San Martín de Porres. While in Mexico, Ovelar saw it as an opportunity to one day play for the Paraguay national football team, as the league featured Paraguayan players who were on the national squad. His limited play in 5 matches enabled him to score 1 goal despite being unable to get a starting position.

=== Alianza Lima ===
After barely playing in Cruz Azul, Ovelar returned to Peru, going to Alianza Lima. He had excellent performances which gave him the opportunity to play for the Peru national team, but he was keen to play for Paraguay. His first goal came on December 5, 2009, in a 2-2 home draw against Cesar Vallejo. His 45th minute go-ahead goal made up for an own-goal he had scored in the 30th minute. Ovelar was subbed off in the 75th minute, replaced by a young André Carrillo.

=== Universidad Católica ===
For summer 2012, Ovelar signed with Chilean side Universidad Católica. He played 15 matches and scored 5 goals. His debut came on January 28, 2012, in a 2-1 win at Palestino. He was subbed off in the 67th minute and replaced by Francisco Pizarro. His first league goal came on March 11, 2012, in a 2-1 win at O'Higgins. He scored a last minute goal to give his team the win.

=== Atlético Junior ===
In 2014, Ovelar signed for Colombian side Junior. He made his debut on July 20, 2014 (on Colombian Independence Day), in a 0–1 defeat against AS Monaco for the 2014 Copa EuroAmericana.

He is second on the all time list of appearances for the team, with over 140 caps in all competitions.

=== Millonarios ===
In January 2018, Ovelar moved to Millonarios in the Categoría Primera A for an undisclosed transfer fee. He made his team debut and start on February 11, 2018 in a 1-0 victory over Patriotas Boyacá.

=== Late career ===
In 2023, Ovelar played for General Caballero de Juan León Mallorquín in the Paraguayan Primera División. They ended his contract in June of the same year.

In March 2025, Ovelar was appointed as manager of Patriotas in the Paraguayan Primera División B Nacional, after his stint as a player. Two days later, he joined 3 de Febrero, his last club.
