= Víctor Pinto =

Paraguayan footballer

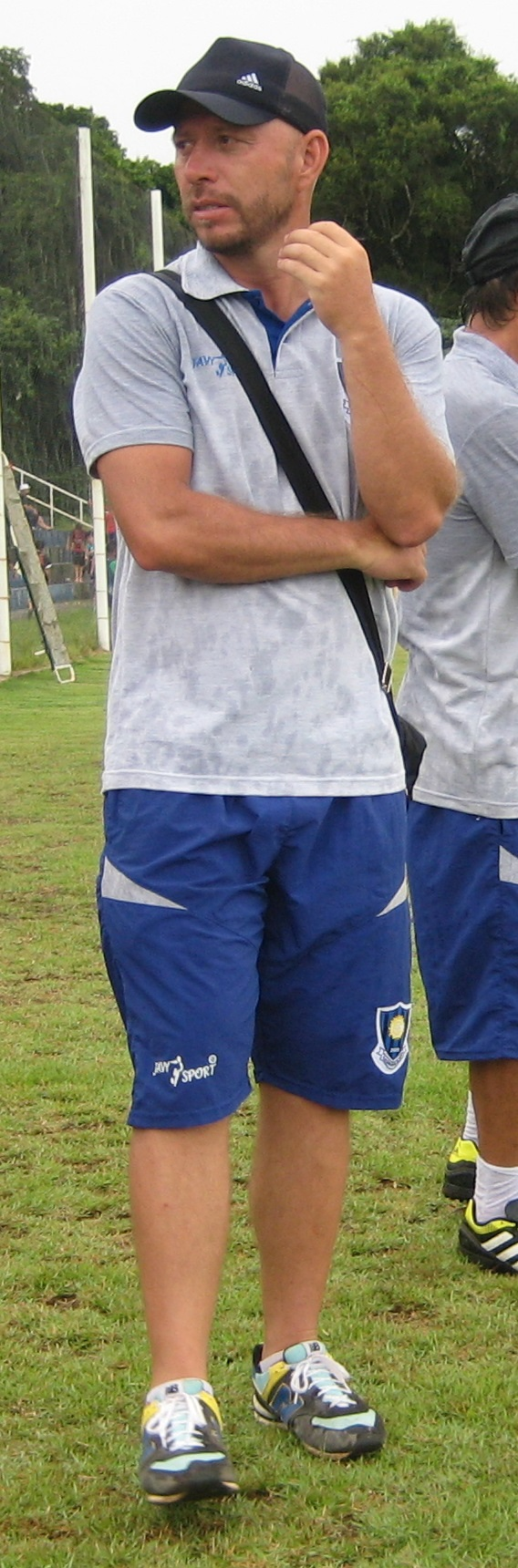
Víctor Pinto DT de Sol del Este en 2017

Víctor Pinto is a Paraguayan former association football player and current coach for Club Deportivo Sol del Este in the Paraguayan Tercera División.

He played in the Primera División Paraguaya for Club 12 de Octubre with Dario Veron and Salvador Cabañas.
