= Josías (footballer) =

Brazilian footballer

Personal information
- Full name: Josias Paulo Cardoso Júnior
- Date of birth: 7 November 1981 (age 45)
- Place of birth: Goiânia, Brazil
- Height: 1.83 m (6 ft 0 in)
- Positions: Midfielder; forward

Senior career*
Years	Team	Apps	(Gls)
2003	Esportiva Matsubara		
2004	Goiânia		
2004	2 de Mayo		
2005	Silvio Pettirossi		
2005	General Caballero		
2006	Club Olimpia		
2007	Deportivo Macará		
2007	Choré Central		
2008	2 de Mayo		
2009	León	3	(0)
2009	2 de Mayo	12	(4)
2010–2011	Sol de América	30	(4)
2011	→ FC Brașov (loan)	9	(2)
2011	→ General Caballero (loan)	16	(2)
2012	Rubio Ñu	25	(6)
2013–2014	Cienciano	39	(8)
2014–2016	Los Caimanes	34	(12)
2017	Deportivo Coopsol	21	(11)
2018	Deportivo Hualgayoc	21	(4)
Total		210	(53)
- * Club domestic league appearances and goals

Josias Paulo Cardoso Júnior (born 7 November 1981 in Goiânia) is a Brazilian former professional footballer who played as a midfielder and forward. In the first half of 2011 he was loaned to Romanian Liga I team FC Brașov from the Paraguayan team Sol de América.
