= Club Choré Central =

Paraguayan football club

Choré Central
- Full name: Club Choré Central
- Founded: 19 January 1965
- Ground: Estadio Asteria Mendoza; Choré, Paraguay
- Capacity: 3, 500
- League: Primera B Nacional
- 2023: First stage
Home colours	Away colours

Club Choré Central, is a Paraguayan football club based in the city of Choré. The club was founded on 19 January 1965 and plays in the Primera B Nacional. The club achieved two participations in the División Intermedia, Paraguay's second-tier league. Their home games are played at the Estadio Asteria Mendoza which has a capacity of approximately 3,500 seats.

== History ==
=== 2004 ===
The club were champions of the Liga Deportiva de Choré in 2004.

=== 2005 ===
In the 2005 third-tier season, Choré Central were crowned champions and promoted to the División Intermedia for 2006.

=== 2006 ===
The club held its 2006 pre-season preparation in the city of Itá. On 28 May, Choré defeated Rubio Ñu 2–1 after losing 1–0 in a Round 6 fixture of the season. On 25 June, the club drew 2–2 away against Encarnación team Universal after losing 2–0 in the first half. On 6 August, Choré scored two goals in the last five minutes of the game to defeat Cerro Porteño PF 2–1 to avoid relegation from the second-tier. In the following game, they lost 3–1 against Sol de América after a double from Pablo Zeballos, who ended the season as the league's leading goal scorer. They finished the season in 6th place with 22 points, four points clear of relegation.

=== 2007 ===
During the 2007 División Intermedia season, the club finished in bottom position of the league table with 17 points and were relegated.

== Notable players ==
To appear in this section a player must have either:

- Played at least 125 games for the club.
- Set a club record or won an individual award while at the club.
- Been part of a national team at any time.
- Played in the first division of any other football association (outside of Paraguay).
- Played in a continental and/or intercontinental competition.

2010's

- (Brazil) Josías Paulo Cardoso Júnior (2007–2008)

Non-CONMEBOL players

- Ninguno

== Honors ==
- Third Division Titles: 2005
