= Estadio La Arboleda =

Multi-use stadium in Asunción, Paraguay

Coordinates: 25°15′27″S 57°34′30″W

- Interactive map of Estadio La Arboleda
- Full name: Estadio La Arboleda
- Location: Asunción, Paraguay
- Capacity: 8,000
- Field size: 105 × 71 m

Construction
- Opened: 1970

Tenant
- Club Rubio Ñú

Estadio La Arboleda is a multi-use stadium in the Santísima Trinidad neighborhood of Asunción, Paraguay. It is the home ground of the Club Rubio Ñú of the División Intermedia, the second tier professional football league in Paraguay. The stadium holds 8,000 spectators and opened in 1970.
