= Club Oriental =

Paraguayan football club

Oriental
- Full name: Club Oriental
- Nickname(s): Los Uruguayos
- Founded: March 12, 1912
- Ground: Estadio Oriental, Barrio Ricardo Brugada, Asunción, Paraguay
- Capacity: 4,000
- Chairman: (Paraguay) Isabelino Martinez
- Manager: (Paraguay) Osvaldo Florente
- League: Primera de Ascenso
- 2008: -
| Home colours | Away colours |

Club Oriental, is a Paraguayan football club based in the barrio of La Chacarita, in Asunción. The club was founded March 12, 1912 and plays in the third division of the Paraguayan league. Their home games are played at the Oriental stadium.

== Honours ==
- Paraguayan Second Division: 1

1981

- Paraguayan Third Division: 3

1963, 1967, 1998
