= Víctor Cabañas =

Paraguayan professional footballer (born 2003)

Personal information
- Full name: Víctor Ramón Cabañas
- Date of birth: 13 February 2003 (age 23)
- Place of birth: United States
- Height: 1.75 m (5 ft 9 in)
- Position: Right-back

Team information
- Current team: Cerro Porteño
- Number: 32

Youth career
- –2023: Marcet Foundation

Senior career*
Years	Team	Apps	(Gls)
2023–	Cerro Porteño	14	(0)

International career
2023	Paraguay national under-20 football team	3	(0)
- * Club domestic league appearances and goals

Víctor Ramón Cabañas (born February 13, 2003) is a Paraguayan professional footballer who plays as a right-back for Cerro Porteño in the Paraguayan Primera División.

== Career ==
Cabañas began his football development at the Marcet Foundation academy in Barcelona, Spain.

In 2023, he signed with Cerro Porteño, one of the most prominent clubs in Paraguay, and joined the first team. He made his professional debut in the Paraguayan Primera División on June 3, 2023.

== International career ==
He has been called up to the Paraguay national under-20 football team, participating in the 2023 South American U-20 Championship, where he played three matches as a starter.

== Statistics ==
- Updated as of February 2025.*

=== Club ===
Season	Club	League			National Cups			Continental Cups			Total	
Season	Club	Comp	Apps	Goals	Comp	Apps	Goals	Comp	Apps	Goals	Apps	Goals
2023	PRY Cerro Porteño	PD	8	0	CP	1	0	CL	0	0	9	0
2024	PRY Cerro Porteño	PD	6	0	CP	1	0	CL+CS	1	0	8	0
Career total			14	0		2	0		0	0	17	0

=== National team ===
Tournament	Edition	Matches	Goals	Assists
South American U-20 Championship	2023	3	0	0
