= Arturo Villasanti =

Paraguayan football manager (born 1985)

Personal information
- Full name: Arturo Rafael Villasanti Mora
- Date of birth: 13 May 1985 (age 41)
- Place of birth: Fernando de la Mora, Paraguay
- Height: 1.86 m (6 ft 1 in)
- Position: Centre-back

Senior career*
Years	Team	Apps	(Gls)
2006–2007	Fernando de la Mora		
2008	Silvio Pettirossi	10	(0)
2008	Boca Unidos	0	(0)
2009	Deportes Iquique	7	(0)
2009–2010	Boca Unidos	5	(0)
2010–2011	Central Norte	25	(0)
2011–2012	Defensores de Belgrano	19	(3)
2012–2013	Sportivo Belgrano	13	(0)
2013–2014	Unión de Mar del Plata	21	(0)
2014–2015	Sportivo Patria	35	(0)
2016	Sarmiento de Resistencia	0	(0)
2016–2017	Sol de América de Formosa	1	(0)
Total		136	(3)

Managerial career
- 2017–2022: Tembetary (youth)
- 2023–2025: Tembetary
- * Club domestic league appearances and goals

Arturo Rafael Villasanti Mora (born 13 May 1985) is a Paraguayan football manager and former player who played as a centre-back.

== Playing career ==
Born in Fernando de la Mora, Villasanti played for hometown side Fernando de la Mora and Silvio Pettirossi before moving abroad with Boca Unidos in 2008. In 2009, after a short spell at Deportes Iquique, he returned to the club, and featured rarely in the Primera B Nacional.

In 2011, after a one-year spell at Central Norte, Villasanti signed for Defensores de Belgrano in the Primera B Metropolitana. He joined Sportivo Belgrano in 2012, and moved to Unión de Mar del Plata on 2 August 2013 after achieving promotion.

On 29 December 2015, after playing for Sportivo Patria, Villasanti agreed to a deal with Sarmiento de Resistencia, but left the club the following 25 January due to "personal reasons". He subsequently represented Sol de América de Formosa before retiring in 2017, aged 32.

== Managerial career ==
After retiring, Villasanti returned to his home country and joined Tembetary, being a manager of the youth sides and coordinator of the football school. In March 2023, he was announced as first team manager for the year's Primera División B Metropolitana, and achieved promotion as champions.

Villasanti remained a manager of the Rojiverdes in the 2024 Paraguayan División Intermedia, achieving a second consecutive promotion after finishing second. On 10 April 2025, however, he resigned.

== Honours ==
Tembetary

- Primera División B Metropolitana: 2023
