= Hugo Santacruz =

Paraguayan footballer (born 1989)

Personal information
- Full name: Hugo Sebastian; Santacruz Villalba
- Date of birth: 6 February 1989 (age 37)
- Place of birth: Yasy Cañy, Paraguay
- Height: 1.80 m (5 ft 11 in)
- Position: Forward

Team information
- Current team: Rubio Ñu
- Number: 9

Senior career*
Years	Team	Apps	(Gls)
2010–2016	Libertad	12	(2)
2010	→ 3 de Febrero (loan)	7	(0)
2011	→ General Caballero (loan)	29	(16)
2013	→ Manta (loan)	17	(3)
2014	→ 3 de Febrero (loan)	19	(1)
2015–2016	→ Sol de América (loan)	26	(7)
2016	Alianza Atlético	15	(3)
2017	Independiente Asunción	4	(0)
2017	Sportivo Trinidense	9	(1)
2018–	Rubio Ñu	?	(?)
- * Club domestic league appearances and goals

Hugo Sebastián Santacruz Villalba (born 6 February 1989 in Yasy Cañy, Paraguay) is a Paraguayan footballer currently playing for Club Rubio Ñu.
