= Digno González =

Paraguayan footballer (born 1990)

Personal information
- Full name: Digno Javier González Sosa
- Date of birth: 12 May 1990 (age 36)
- Place of birth: Caraguatay, Paraguay
- Height: 1.76 m (5 ft 9 1/2 in)
- Position: Forward

Team information
- Current team: 3 de Febrero
- Number: 17

Senior career*
Years	Team	Apps	(Gls)
2009–2013	Cerro Porteño	15	(1)
2011	→ Rubio Ñu (loan)	20	(4)
2012	→ Atlético Huila (loan)	7	(1)
2012	→ Real Cartagena (loan)	11	(0)
2014	Real Garcilaso	2	(0)
2014	Rangers	1	(0)
2015	Resistencia		
2016–2021	3 de Febrero	31+	(9+)
2022	Sportivo Luqueño		
2023	Sportivo San Lorenzo	11	(0)
2023	Atyrá	14	(5)
2024–	3 de Febrero	24	(0)

International career
2009	Paraguay U20	0	(0)
- * Club domestic league appearances and goals as of 30 December 2024

Digno Javier González Sosa (born 12 May 1990) is a Paraguayan football forward who plays for 3 de Febrero.

== Career ==
González started his career with Cerro Porteño. He also had a stint with Rubio Ñu before moving to Colombia and playing for Atlético Huila and Real Cartagena. In 2014, he played for Peruvian club Real Garcilaso and Chilean club Rangers de Talca.

From 2016 to 2021, González played for 3 de Febrero. In December 2021 of Paraguay's summer transfer window, he joined Sportivo Luqueño.

In 2023, González played for Sportivo San Lorenzo and Atyrá.

In 2024, González rejoined 3 de Febrero.
