= APF División Intermedia =

División Intermedia
- Founded: 1910
- Country: Paraguay
- Confederation: CONMEBOL
- Number of clubs: 16
- Level on pyramid: 2
- Promotion to: Primera División
- Relegation to: Primera División B Primera División B Nacional
- Domestic cup: Copa Paraguay
- Current champions: Deportivo Santaní (1st title) (2026)
- Most championships: Presidente Hayes; Rubio Ñu (8 titles each)
- Broadcasters: Tigo Max (all games per matchday); Tigo Sports (Two games per matchday); Telefuturo (highlights per matchday); Paravisión (Only are broadcast live the best match Saturday at 16:30 or Sunday at 11:00)
- Current: 2026 season

The División Intermedia (English: Intermediate Division), also known as the Segunda División (English: Second Division), is the second highest association football league in Paraguay. It is organized by the Asociación Paraguaya de Fútbol.

== Overview ==
Since 1910 the second division tournaments have changed rules, number of teams and names. As of 2006, División Intermedia is the name for the second division and 16 teams are part of it. The champion and the runner-up of this league gains the right to participate in the Liga Paraguaya: Primera División, the Paraguay's top division of football. The last three teams are relegated to the third division (called "Primera de Ascenso" for teams from Gran Asunción and Primera División Nacional B for teams outside of the Gran Asunción area). The three spots left by relegated teams are occupied by one team from the Primera de Ascenso and one team from the Primera División Nacional B which is a tournament where teams from the whole country compete, giving them a chance to eventually make it to the first division.

== Clubs ==
Locations of the 2026 División Intermedia teams

Sixteen teams will contest the league in its 2026 season, including three promoted from the 2025 Tercera División: 3 de Noviembre, Benjamín Aceval, and Paraguarí, and two relegated from the 2025 Copa de Primera: General Caballero (JLM) and Tembetary.

Team	City	Stadium	Capacity
3 de Noviembre	Asunción	Rubén Ramírez	3,500
12 de Junio	Villa Hayes	Facundo de León Fossati	5,000
Benjamín Aceval	Villa Hayes	Isidro Roussillón	5,000
Deportivo Capiatá	Capiatá	Erico Galeano	10,000
Deportivo Santaní	San Estanislao	Juan José Vázquez	8,000
Encarnación	Encarnación	Villa Alegre	16,000
Fernando de la Mora	Asunción	Emiliano Ghezzi	6,000
General Caballero (JLM)	Juan León Mallorquín	Ka'arendy	10,000
Guaireña	Villarrica	Parque del Guairá	11,000
Independiente (CG)	Asunción	Ricardo Gregor	4,000
Paraguarí	Carapeguá	Municipal de Carapeguá (Note: Used as home stadium for the season since Paraguarí's stadium Estadio General Bruguez in Paraguarí did not meet APF requirements.)	10,000
Resistencia	Asunción	Tomás Beggan Correa	3,500
Sol de América	Villa Elisa	Luis Alfonso Giagni	11,000
Sportivo Carapeguá	Carapeguá	Municipal de Carapeguá	10,000
Tacuary	Asunción	Toribio Vargas	3,000
Tembetary	Villa Elisa	Luis Alfonso Giagni (Note: Used as home stadium for the season since Tembetary's stadium Complejo Tembetary in Villa Elisa did not meet APF requirements.)	11,000

== List of champions ==
=== Segunda División ===
Season	Champion
1910	Nacional B
1911	Presidente Hayes
1912	Championship not played
1913	River Plate
1914	10 de Agosto
1915	Marte Atlético
1916	Marte Atlético
1917	Villa del Salto

=== División Intermedia ===
Season	Champion
1918	Sastre Sport
1919	Presidente Hayes
1920	Cerro Porteño B
1921	Sastre Sport
1922	Championship not played
1923	Deportivo Meilicke
1924	Sportivo Luqueño
1925	Sastre Sport
1926	Rubio Ñú
1927	Atlántida
1928	General Caballero
1929	CALT
1930	Fernando de la Mora
1931	Sastre Sport
1932–36	Championship not played
1937	12 de Octubre (VA)
1938	Atlético Sajonia
1939	24 de Septiembre
1940	Sport Colombia
1941	Rubio Ñú
1942	24 de Septiembre
1943	24 de Septiembre
1944	Sport Colombia
1945	Sport Colombia
1946	Deportivo Pinozá
1947	Championship not played
1948	Asunción FBC
1949	San Lorenzo
1950	Sport Colombia

=== Segunda División ===
Season	Champion
1951	Atlántida
1952	General Genes
1953	San Lorenzo
1954	Rubio Ñu
1955	General Genes
1956	Sportivo Luqueño
1957	River Plate
1958	Presidente Hayes
1959	Tembetary
1960	San Lorenzo
1961	Rubio Ñu
1962	General Caballero
1963	Rubio Ñu

=== Primera División B/Primera División de Ascenso ===
Season	Champion
1964	Sportivo Luqueño
1965	Sol de América
1966	Resistencia
1967	Presidente Hayes
1968	Sportivo Luqueño
1969	Silvio Pettirossi
1970	General Caballero
1971	Presidente Hayes
1972	Rubio Ñu
1973	Presidente Hayes
1974	Presidente Hayes
1975	Resistencia
1976	Tembetary
1977	Sol de América
1978	Capitán Figari
1979	Nacional
1980	Resistencia
1981	Oriental
1982	Atlético Colegiales
1983	Tembetary
1984	San Lorenzo
1985	Sport Colombia
1986	General Caballero
1987	San Lorenzo
1988	Tembetary
1989	Nacional
1990	Cerro Corá
1991	Presidente Hayes
1992	Sport Colombia
1993	Deportivo Humaitá
1994	San Lorenzo
1995	Tembetary
1996	Cerro Corá

=== División Intermedia ===
Season	Champion	Runner-up
1997	12 de Octubre	Olimpia (Itá)
1998	Resistencia	Sportivo Iteño
1999	Universal	Nacional
2000	Libertad	Sport Colombia
2001	Deportivo Recoleta	Sport Colombia
2002	Tacuary	Presidente Hayes
2003	Nacional	3 de Febrero
2004	3 de Febrero	General Caballero
2005	2 de Mayo	Fernando de la Mora
2006	Sol de América	Sportivo Trinidense
2007	Silvio Pettirossi	General Díaz
2008	Rubio Ñu	General Caballero
2009	Sportivo Trinidense	Sport Colombia
2010	General Caballero	Independiente
2011	Cerro Porteño (PF)	Sportivo Carapeguá
2012	General Díaz	Deportivo Capiatá
2013	3 de Febrero	12 de Octubre
2014	San Lorenzo	Deportivo Santaní
2015	River Plate	General Caballero
2016	Independiente	Sportivo Trinidense
2017	3 de Febrero	Deportivo Santaní
2018	River Plate	San Lorenzo
2019	Guaireña	12 de Octubre
2020	Not played due to the COVID-19 pandemic	
2021	General Caballero (JLM)	Resistencia
2022	Sportivo Trinidense	Sportivo Luqueño
2023	Sol de América	2 de Mayo
2024	Deportivo Recoleta	Tembetary
2025	Rubio Ñu	San Lorenzo
2026	Deportivo Santaní	General Caballero (JLM)

== Titles by club ==
Club	Titles	Winning years
Presidente Hayes	8	1911, 1919, 1958, 1967, 1971, 1973, 1974, 1991
Rubio Ñu	8	1926, 1941, 1954, 1961, 1963, 1972, 2008, 2025
San Lorenzo	7	1949, 1953, 1960, 1984, 1987, 1994, 2014
General Caballero	6	1923, 1928, 1962, 1970, 1986, 2010
Sport Colombia	6	1940, 1944, 1945, 1950, 1985, 1992
Tembetary	5	1959, 1976, 1983, 1988, 1995
Sportivo Luqueño	4	1924, 1956, 1964, 1968
Resistencia	4	1966, 1975, 1980, 1998
Sastre Sport	4	1918, 1921, 1925, 1931
River Plate	4	1913, 1957, 2015, 2018
Sol de América	4	1965, 1977, 2006, 2023
Nacional	3	1979, 1989, 2003
24 de Setiembre	3	1939, 1942, 1943
3 de Febrero	3	2004, 2013, 2017
Atlántida	2	1927, 1951
Cerro Corá	2	1990, 1996
Deportivo Recoleta	2	2001, 2024
General Genes	2	1952, 1955
Marte Atlético	2	1915, 1916
Silvio Pettirossi	2	1969, 2007
Sportivo Trinidense	2	2009, 2022
Deportivo Santaní	1	2026
Independiente	1	2016
General Díaz	1	2012
Cerro Porteño (PF)	1	2011
2 de Mayo	1	2005
Tacuary	1	2002
Libertad	1	2000
Universal	1	1999
12 de Octubre	1	1997
Deportivo Humaitá	1	1993
Atlético Colegiales	1	1982
Oriental	1	1981
Capitán Figari	1	1978
Asunción FBC	1	1948
Deportivo Pinozá	1	1946
Atlético Sajonia	1	1938
12 de Octubre (VA)	1	1937
Fernando de la Mora	1	1930
CALT	1	1929
Cerro Porteño B	1	1920
Villa del Salto	1	1917
10 de Agosto	1	1914
Nacional B	1	1910
Guaireña	1	2019
General Caballero (JLM)	1	2021

== List of goalscorers ==
Season	Player	Club	Goals
2008	(Paraguay) Victor Gómez	Rubio Ñu	10
2007	(Paraguay) Cristian Ovelar	Cerro Porteño PF	14
2006	(Paraguay) Pablo Zeballos	Sol de América	15
2005	(Paraguay) Casiano Delvalle	Sport Colombia	15
2004	(Paraguay) Adolfo Fatecha	General Caballero ZC	11

== See also ==
- Football in Paraguay
- Paraguayan football league system
- Primera División Paraguaya
- Paraguayan Tercera División
