= Guillermo Beltrán =

Paraguayan footballer (born 1984)

Personal information
- Full name: Guillermo Alexis Beltrán Paredes
- Date of birth: 25 June 1984 (age 42)
- Place of birth: San Juan Bautista, Paraguay
- Height: 1.88 m (6 ft 2 in)
- Position: Forward

Team information
- Current team: Nacional
- Number: 19

Senior career*
Years	Team	Apps	(Gls)
2006–2011	Nacional	32	(11)
2008	→ 12 de Octubre (loan)		
2011–2012	Once Caldas	13	(1)
2012–2017	Cerro Porteño	66	(29)
2014–2015	→ Vitória (loan)	6	(0)
2017	Guarani	10	(1)
2018	Avaí	13	(1)
2019	Deportivo Santaní	33	(4)
2020–	Nacional	9	(3)
- * Club domestic league appearances and goals as of 20:17, 23 July 2020 (UTC)

Guillermo Alexis Beltrán Paredes (Note: In this Spanish name, the first or paternal surname is Beltrán and the second or maternal family name is Paredes.) (born June 25, 1984), known as Guillermo Beltrán, is a Paraguayan footballer who is currently playing for Club Nacional.

== Teams ==
- Independiente de Campo Grande 2005
- Nacional 2006–2007
- 12 de Octubre 2008
- Nacional 2009–2010
- Once Caldas 2011
- Cerro Porteño 2012–2017
- Vitória 2014–2015 (loan)
- Guarani 2017–
- Avaí 2018–

== Titles ==
- Nacional 2009 (Torneo Clausura Paraguayan Primera División Championship)
- Cerro Porteño 2012 (Torneo Clausura Paraguayan Primera División Championship)
