= Paraguayan Primera División B Nacional =

- Country: Paraguay
- Number of clubs: 20
- Promotion to: División Intermedia
- Current champions: Guaraní de Fram (2024)
- Website: apf.org.py
- Current: 2024 season

The Primera División B Nacional (National First Division B, in English), commonly known as Primera B Nacional or Nacional B, is one of the three leagues of Paraguay's Tercera División, the third-tier of Paraguayan football league system, in which clubs and teams from the leagues of the interior of the country compete. The championship is organized by the Unión del Fútbol del Interior, in association with the Paraguayan Football Association.

== Teams ==
These are the teams that are participating in the 2024 season.

Team	City	Stadium	Capacity	Foundation
12 de Junio-CPE	Caacupé	Coronel Manuel Cabañas	1.000	12 June 1936
América	Pedro Juan Caballero	Río Parapiti	25.000	20 April 1981
CEFFCA	Saltos del Guairá	Nivaldo Suárez	2.000	18 April 2013
Choré Central	Choré	Asteria Mendoza	4.000	19 January 1965
Guaraní-Fram	Fram	Carlos Memmel	6.000	27 November 1949
Independiente FC	Hernandarias	Independiente de Hernandarias		24 April 1983
Itapuense	Encarnación	Villa Alegre	16.000	19 March 2019
Nacional-SDG	Salto del Guairá	Ary Arthur Méndez	2.000	2 February 1975
Olimpia-Villarrica	Villarrica	Valeriano Villaverde	5.000	25 September 1931
Patriotas	Hernandarias	Próceres de Mayo	3.000	6 February 2021
R.I. 3 Corrales	Ciudad del Este	General Eduardo Torreani	3.000	29 September 1980
Salto del Guairá	Salto del Guairá	Emigdio Vallejos	2.000	5 July 1964
Sportivo San Pedro	San Pedro del Paraná	Joaquín de Alós	2.000	15 December 1940
Deportivo Unión	Pilar	Contralmirante Ramón Martino	2.000	8 December 1985

== List of champions ==
Ed.	Season	Champion	Runner-up
1	2011	Sportivo 2 de Mayo	Sol del Este
2	2012	Liga Caacupeña	Liga Concepcionera
3	2013	Liga Caaguaceña	Liga Ovetense
4	2014	Liga Ovetense	Liga Guaireña
5	2015	Liga Ovetense	22 de Setiembre
6	2016	22 de Setiembre	R.I. 3 Corrales
7	2017	Sportivo 2 de Mayo	R.I. 3 Corrales
8	2018	General Caballero (JLM)	Nacional-1DM
9	2019	Guaraní-Trinidad	Liga Carapegüeña
–	2020	Cancelled due to COVID-19 pandemic	
10	2021	Deportivo Itapuense	Sportivo Carapeguá
11	2022	Sportivo Carapeguá	Deportivo Caaguazú
12	2023	12 de Junio-VHA	Ovetense
13	2024	Guaraní-Fram	CEFFCA
14	2025	15 de Mayo	Patriotas

== Titles by club ==
Club	Titles	Runners-up	Seasons won	Seasons runner-up
Ovetense	2	2	2014, 2015	2013, 2023
2 de Mayo	2	0	2011, 2017	
Sportivo Carapeguá	1	2	2022	2019, 2021
22 de Setiembre	1	1	2016	2015
Deportivo Caaguazú	1	1	2013	2022
Liga Caacupeña	1	0	2012	
General Caballero (JLM)	1	0	2018	
Guaraní-Trinidad	1	0	2019	
Deportivo Itapuense	1	0	2021	
12 de Junio-VHA	1	0	2023	
Guaraní-Fram	1	0	2024	
15 de Mayo	1	0	2024	
R.I. 3 Corrales	0	2		2016, 2017
Sol del Este	0	1		2011
Liga Concepcionera	0	1		2012
Liga Guaireña	0	1		2014
Nacional-1DM	0	1		2018
CEFFCA	0	1		2024
Patriotas	0	1		2025

== See also ==
- Paraguayan Football Association
- Paraguayan football league system
- Copa Paraguay
