= Santísima Trinidad (Asunción) =

Coordinates: 25°15′S 57°38′W

- Barrio
- Interactive map of Santísima Trinidad
- Country: Paraguay
- Autonomous Capital District: Gran Asunción
- City: Asunción

Area
  - Total: 0.91 km^{2} (0.35 sq mi)
- Elevation: 43 m (141 ft)

Population
  - Total: 4,500

Santísima Trinidad is a neighbourhood of Asunción, Paraguay.
