= Patriotas Fútbol Club =

Paraguayan football club

Patriotas FC
- Full name: Patriotas Fútbol Club
- Founded: 6 February 2021; 5 years ago
- Ground: Próceres de Mayo Stadium
- Capacity: 3,000
- President: Olaídes Ferreira
- Head coach: Domingo Ortiz
- League: Primera B Nacional
- 2023: Semifinals
Home colours

Patriotas Fútbol Club, simply known as Patriotas, is a Paraguayan football club based in Hernandarias, Alto Paraná.

Initially, they played in its regional league, the Liga Hernandariense de Fútbol (equivalent to the Fourth Division), but since 2022 they had also begun participating in the Primera B Nacional (equivalent to the Third Division).

== History ==
It was established on February 6, 2021, by Brazilian businessman Olaídes Duarte Ferreira, who has previouslu founded Patriotas Futebol Clube in Curitiba, Brazil in 2020.

Since then it has had a great acceptance in the local public, forming a large fan base in its city, in which it is one of the most prominent teams currently, along with Obreros Unidos and 4 de Octubre. In the 2022 season, they began playing in the Primera B Nacional, reaching the second phase of the tournament. In 2023, they reached the semi-final of the Primera B Nacional.

== Stadium ==
The Próceres de Mayo Stadium is located 3 km south of the urban center of Hernandarias and 2 km from the PY07 route (former Supercarretera), in the area near the Acaray River.

The stadium initially had a capacity for 2,000 spectators in 2021, until in 2023 it began a remodeling process that culminated on April 9, 2024, which consisted of the expansion of its stands to 3,000 spectators, a major improvement in its lighting and the infrastructure of the complex in general.

== Honours ==
=== Regionals ===
- Liga Hernandariense de Fútbol (1): 2023
- Pre Copa Paraguay - Alto Paraná (1): 2024 (departmental champion classified to the 2024 Copa Paraguay)
