= Ricardo Brugada =

Coordinates: 25°17′S 57°37′W

Ricardo Brugada La Chacarita
- Barrio
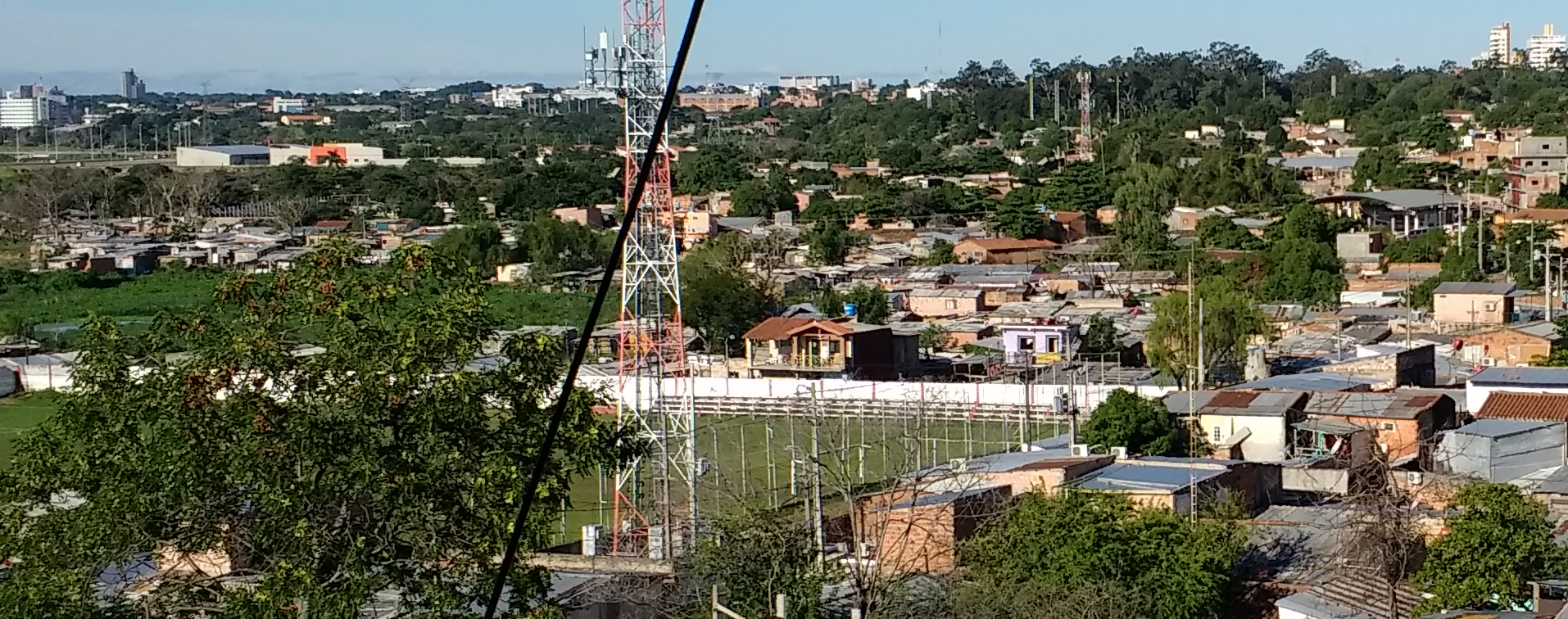
- Interactive map of Ricardo Brugada
- Country: Paraguay
- City: Asunción
- District: San Roque

Area
  - Total: 1.5 km^{2} (0.58 sq mi)

Population (2002)
  - Total: 10,455
  - Density: 6,970/km^{2} (18,100/sq mi)

Ricardo Brugada, mostly known as La Chacarita, is a neighbourhood of Asunción, the capital of Paraguay. It is a shanty town and one of the poorest locations in the entire country. Approximately 20,000 people live there. It is located in the center of the metropolitan area of Asunción, close to city landmarks such as the Government Palace, the Parliament, the Cathedral, the Catholic University and the Costanera. It is located on the banks of the Paraguay River, starting at the Bernardino Caballero Park until the port of Asuncion.

Paraguayan musician and composer, Maneco Galeano, immortalized the name of this barrio in a Guarania song called "Soy de la Chacarita" (I am from the Chacarita). This neighbourhood is also characterized by its football (soccer) teams that play in the lower divisions of the Paraguayan league: Resistencia, Oriental, San Felipe and 3 de Febrero.
