= Deportivo Pinozá =

Paraguayan football club

Pinozá
- Full name: Deportivo Pinozá
- Founded: 1 November 1921
- Ground: Estadio Juan B. Ruíz Díaz
- Capacity: 80
- Chairman: (Paraguay) Miguel Ciñones
- Manager: (Paraguay) Eumelio Palacios
- League: Paraguay fourth-tier
Home colours	Away colours

Deportivo Pinozá, is a Paraguayan football club based in the neighbourhood of Bernardino Caballero in Asunción. The club was founded 1 November 1921 and currently plays in the Paraguayan Cuarta Division, Paraguay's fourth-tier.

== History ==
The club was founded in the Pinozá's neighborhood by a group of neighbors, in the city of Asunción. After many years bought some terrains for his own field in a neighboring neighborhood, thanks to the approval of the former president of the republic Alfredo Stroessner, who had done a favor from friends to his hairdresser Hilario Aguilera, the main manager of said event.

Traditionally played the classics of the area together with the Fernando de la Mora and 24 de Septiembre clubs (now extinct).

The club competed in championships organized by the defunct Paraguayan Sports Federation.

In 1939 obtained his first title by crowning himself champion of the first championship of the Third Division called Segunda de Ascenso at that time, the following year was crowned champion of the same division, since there were no promotions in those years.

In 1946 obtained the title of champion of the Second Division, but as in those years there were no promotions the club did not reach the highest category.

In 1948 again obtained the title of champion of the Segunda de Ascenso, third and last category of Paraguayan football in those years.

In 1980 won the quadrangular championship of the Segunda de Ascenso against the General Caballero de Campo Grande Club, achieving the title symbolically since they could not ascend due to lack of compliance with regulations on the Alfredo Stroessner Stadium.

== Stadium ==
The Alfredo Stroessner stadium has a capacity for 100 seated people and is located on Willian Richardson streets between Incas and Indio Francisco in the Vista Alegre neighborhood of Asunción.

== Honours ==
- Paraguayan Third Division: 3

1939, 1940, 1948
