= Estadio Municipal de Carapegua =

Football stadium in Carapeguá, Paraguay

Coordinates: 25.760361°S 57.235111°W

The Estadio Municipal de Carapeguá is a football stadium in the city of Carapeguá, Paraguay. The stadium has a grass pitch and a capacity of 9,000 spectators. Construction of the stadium was started in 2010 by the company Villalba Piñeiro and was completed in 2012. During the COVID-19 outbreak, the stadium served as a quarantine center.

== History ==
Construction of the stadium began in 2010, and was completed in July 2012 as part of an investment by the Secretaria Nacional de Deportes. The stadium was set up for its first use soon after.

In February 2021, Paraguayan newspaper Cronica announced the stadium was undergoing cleaning and renovation with support from the municipality and the Secretaria Nacional de Deportes. The newspaper said the stadium could potentially be used as an Olympic Track once work was completed.
