= Estadio Tomás Beggan Correa =

Football stadium

Coordinates: 25.2797°S 57.6255°W

The Estadio Tomás Beggan Correa is a football stadium in the neighborhood of Ricardo Brugada, a.k.a. La Chacarita, in the city of Asunción, Paraguay. It has a capacity of 3,500 seats.

It is the home venue of Primera División club Resistencia.

The name of the stadium is in honor of a former president of the club, under whose mandate the club's first official title was achieved in 1966.

During the flooding of the Paraguay River at the end of 2015, the field was reached by the waters and the facilities were severely affected.

In December 2016, on the club's 99th anniversary, the project to expand the stadium's capacity to around 6,500 people was launched.
