= Club Cristóbal Colón de Juan Augusto Saldívar =

Paraguayan football club

Cristóbal Colón
- Full name: Club Cristóbal Colón de Juan Augusto Saldívar
- Ground: Estadio Optaciano Gómez Rivas
- Chairman: -
- Manager: -
- League: Paraguayan Primera División B

Club Cristóbal Colón de Juan Augusto Saldívar is a Paraguayan football club based in Juan Augusto Saldívar in the Central Department of Paraguay. The club at the moment competes in the Paraguayan Primera División B.

== Notable players ==
- (Paraguay) Cristian Riveros
