= Club Salto del Guairá =

Club Social y Deportivo Salto del Guairá
- Nickname(s): The lions of Canindeyú, The white lion, The salteños
- Founded: July 5, 1964
- Ground: Estadio Emigdio Vallejos, Salto del Guairá, Paraguay
- Capacity: 2,000
- Chairman: Carolina Benitez
- Manager: Vladimir Marín
- League: Primera División B Nacional
- 2023: Second stage
| Home colours | Away colours |

Club Social y Deportivo Salto del Guairá is a sports club in Paraguay located in the city of the same name, in the Department of Canindeyú. It was founded on July 5, 1964, and its main activity is football.

It initially participated in its regional league, the Liga Deportiva Salto del Guairá (equivalent to the fourth division), but since 2022 it began its foray into the Primera División B Nacional, one of the third division leagues of the country.

== Estadio Emigdio Vallejos ==
Its stadium is named in honor of Don Emigdio Vallejos, a prominent former goalkeeper and former president of the club. The venue has a capacity for 2,000 spectators and is located on route PY03, just 2 km from the urban center of Salto del Guairá and 10 km from the border with Mundo Novo, Brazil.
