= Gremio Sol del Este =

Paraguayan football club

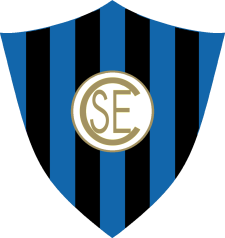
- Full name: Gremio Sol del Este
- Founded: 26 January 2009
- Ground: Estadio Sol del Este; Ciudad del Este, Paraguay
- Chairman: Rovilson Galeano
- League: Primera B Nacional
- 2022: First stage
Home colours

Gremio Sol del Este, commonly known as Sol del Este, is a Paraguayan football club based in Ciudad del Este, Paraguay and plays in the Primera División B Nacional. Until 2018, the club's official name was Club Deportivo Sol del Este.

== History ==
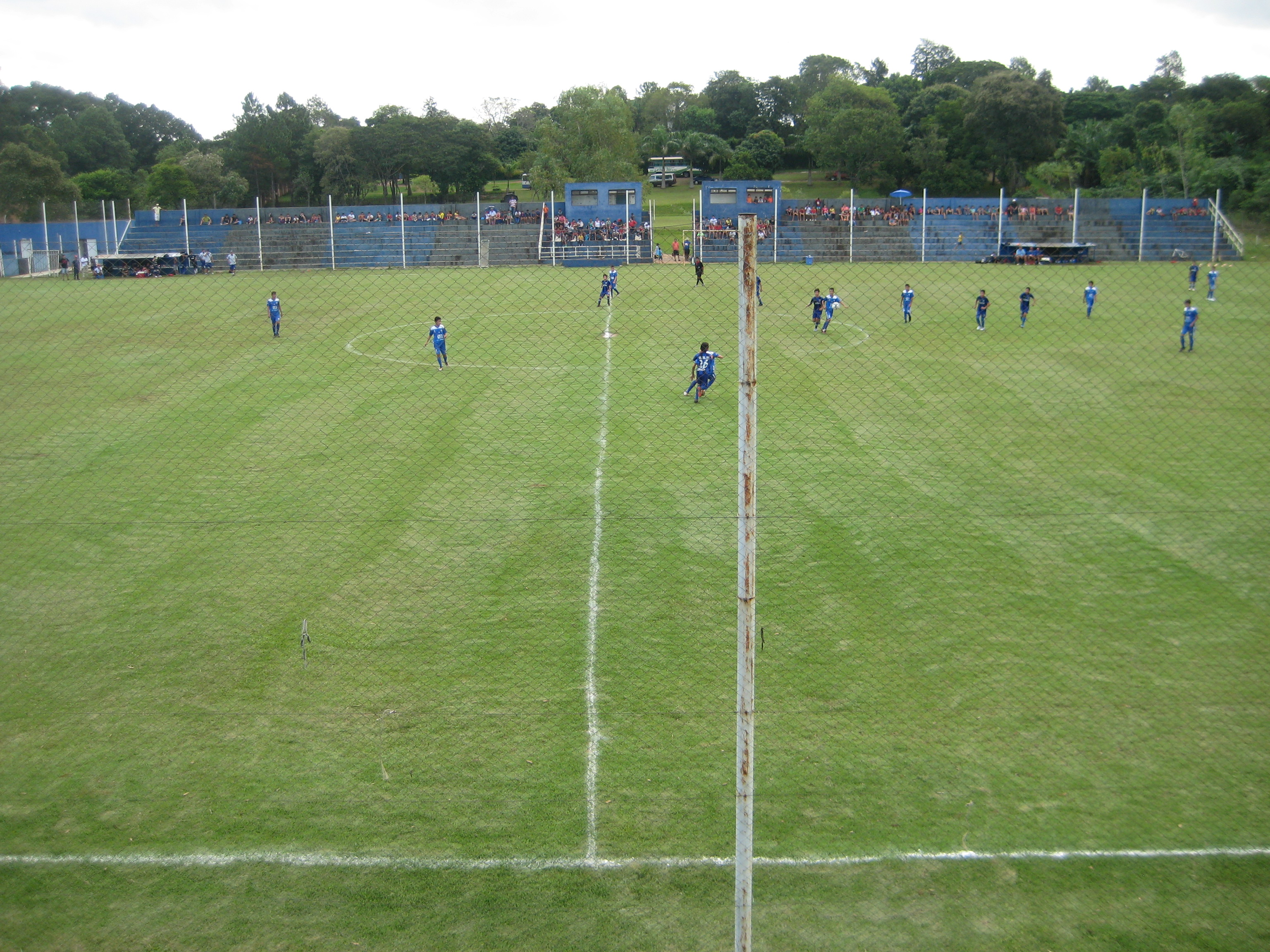
Estadio Sol del Este en 2017

The club was founded 26 January 2009 in Ciudad del Este.

The very first Paraguayan Primera División B Nacional championship was played in 2011 and Sol del Este was its first runner-up.

In 2012, the club was champion of the San Isidro de Curuguaty Cup disputed in Uruguay, as played on behalf of the Liga Deportiva Paranaense.

On 18 May 2015, it was reported that the director of the club, Rovilson Galeano, informed that Sol del Este would withdraw from the 2015 Primera División B Nacional season due to lack of financial resources. The club was scheduled to be one of four Alto Paraná clubs to dispute the competition along with Paranaense, Cerro Porteño PF and R.I. 3 Corrales.

== Honors ==
National

- Paraguayan Third Division

Runner-up: 2011

International

- Copa San Isidro de Curuguaty: 2012
