= Deportivo Santaní =

- Full name: Club Deportivo Santaní
- Nicknames: Albinegra; Depor; El Más Grande del Interior; Santa
- Founded: February 27, 2009
- Ground: Estadio Juan José Vázquez
- Capacity: 8,000
- Chairman: Néstor Arévalos
- Manager: Robert Gauto
- League: División Intermedia
- 2025: División Intermedia, 12th of 16
- Website: http://www.clubdeportivosantani.com/
Home colours	Away colours

Club Deportivo Santaní, sometimes simply known as Santaní, is a Paraguayan football club based in the city of San Estanislao, locally known as Santaní. The club was founded February 27, 2009 and plays in División Intermedia, the second division in the Paraguayan football league system.

== History ==
In the 2014 Division Intermedia season, Deportivo Santaní finished in 2nd position but is tied first with Sportivo San Lorenzo, who are in 1st position, both teams having 57 points. They face each other in a play-off on 1 November 2014 at the Estadio Defensores del Chaco, with the winner gaining the promotion into the first division of Paraguayan Primera División in 2015.

== Current squad ==
As of March 2021.

Note: Flags indicate national team as defined under FIFA eligibility rules; some limited exceptions apply. Players may hold more than one non-FIFA nationality.

No.	Pos.	Nation	Player
—		PAR	Wilson Leiva
—		PAR	Luis Lezcano
—		PAR	Mario Ovando

== Notable players ==
To appear in this section a player must have either:

- Played at least 125 games for the club.
- Set a club record or won an individual award while at the club.
- Been part of a national team at any time.
- Played in the first division of any other football association (outside of Paraguay).
- Played in a continental and/or intercontinental competition.

2000's

2010's

- (Brazil) Rodrigo Teixeira (2015)
- (Paraguay) Víctor Aquino (2015–2016)
- (Argentina) Leandro Gracian (2015–2016)
- (Paraguay) Isidro Pitta (2018-2020)

Non-CONMEBOL players

- (Japan) Hiroki Uchida (2015)
- (Mexico) Alonso Collazo (2015)

== Other disciplines ==
=== Futsal ===
The club's futsal division plays in the Liga Premium, the first division of the Paraguayan futsal league system.
