= Encarnación F.C. =

- Full name: Encarnación Fútbol Club
- Nicknames: Albirroja Encarnacena (The White and Red from Encarnación)
- Founded: 28 February 2023; 3 years ago
- Ground: Estadio Villa Alegre
- Capacity: 16,000
- President: Jorge González
- Head coach: Julio Villalba
- League: División Intermedia
- 2025: División Intermedia, 11th of 16
Home colours	Away colours

Encarnación Fútbol Club, or simply Encarnación FC, is a football club from the city of the same name, in Paraguay. It was founded on February 28, 2023, based on the clubs of the Liga Encarnacena de Fútbol, whose team obtained the right to compete in the División Intermedia, second division of Paraguayan football league system, after being crowned champion of the Campeonato Nacional de Interligas in the 2022–23 season.

== Stadium ==
Encarnación F.C. plays at the Estadio Villa Alegre, which has a capacity for 16,000 people.

== Players ==
=== Current squad ===
- Updated December 29, 2023

Note: Flags indicate national team as defined under FIFA eligibility rules; some limited exceptions apply. Players may hold more than one non-FIFA nationality.

No.	Pos.	Nation	Player
-	POR	PAR	José Aquino
-	DEF	PAR	Richard Escobar
-	DEF	PAR	Guido Aquino
-	DEF	PAR	Nery Bareiro
-	DEF	BRA	Felipe Brunetto
-	MED	PAR	Fidencio Oviedo
-	MED	PAR	Christian Martínez
-	MED	PAR	Matías Maqueda
-	MED	PAR	Hugo Noguera
-	MED	PAR	William Santander
-	DEL	PAR	Juan González
-	DEL	PAR	Marcelo Davalos
-	DEL	PAR	Alex Cáceres
-	DEL	PAR	Derlis Ortiz
