= Club Rubio Ñu =

Paraguayan football club

Rubio Ñu
- Full name: Club Rubio Ñu
- Nicknames: Albiverdes; Laureado; Ñuenses
- Founded: 24 August 1913; 113 years ago
- Ground: Estadio La Arboleda
- Capacity: 8,000
- Chairman: Rubén Martín Ruíz Díaz
- League: Primera División
- 2025: División Intermedia, 1st of 16 (champions and promoted)
Home colours	Away colours	Third colours

Club Rubio Ñu is a Paraguayan football club based in the neighborhood of Santísima Trinidad in Asunción. The club was founded August 24, 1913 and plays in División Intermedia, the second division of the Paraguayan football league system. Their home games are played at the Estadio La Arboleda which has a capacity of approximately 8,000 seats.

== History ==
The club was founded in 1913 by a group of young friends that chose white and green as the colors in representation of "purity" and "hope", respectively. After its foundation Rubio Ñu joined the rebel league "Liga Centenario", which was created by some clubs that had disagreements with the Paraguayan football association (APF) which was in charge of organizing the main league, the Liga Paraguaya. Some 23 years after its foundation, two others clubs from the same Santísima Trinidad neighborhood (Club Itá Ybaté and Club Flor de Mayo) merged with Rubio Ñu. Sportivo Trinidense (which is also from the same neighborhood) is the club's main rival.

After the Liga Centenario disappeared, they were back in the lower divisions of the Liga Paraguaya until finally in 1926 they won the second division and made their way to the first division. Since then, Rubio Ñu has been relegated and promoted between the third, second and first division several times. Most recently in 2008, they won the second division tournament for the 7th time in their history under the coaching of Francisco Arce and made it to the top-flight of Paraguayan football in 2009.

== Honours ==
- Paraguayan Second Division: 8

1926, 1941, 1954, 1961, 1963, 1972, 2008, 2025

- Paraguayan Third Division: 3

1941, 1942, 2005

== Current squad ==
As of 11 April, 2026

Note: Flags indicate national team as defined under FIFA eligibility rules; some limited exceptions apply. Players may hold more than one non-FIFA nationality.

No.	Pos.	Nation	Player
1	GK	ARG	Tomás Canteros
2	DF	PAR	Rodi Ferreira
3	DF	PAR	Javier Vallejos
4	DF	PAR	Jorge González
5	DF	PAR	Pedro Álvarez (on loan from Cerro Porteño)
8	MF	PAR	Rodrigo Rojas
9	FW	PAR	Pedro Báez
10	MF	PAR	William Mendieta (Captain)
11	FW	PAR	Juan Giménez (on loan from Cerro Porteño)
13	DF	PAR	Víctor Cabañas (on loan from Cerro Porteño)
15	MF	PAR	Ángel Cardozo Lucena
17	DF	ARG	Renzo Arzamendia (on loan from Unión Santa Fe)
18	FW	PAR	César Villagra
19	MF	ARG	Santiago Frean
20	MF	PAR	Fernando Martínez
21	FW	PAR	Elías Sarquis

No.	Pos.	Nation	Player
22	GK	BRA	Táles Wastowski
23	FW	PAR	Sebastián Ruíz Díaz (on loan from Sportivo Luqueño)
24	DF	PAR	Diego Velázquez (on loan from Club Guaraní)
25	GK	ARG	Franco Fragueda (on loan from Club Atlético 9 de Julio)
27	MF	PAR	Stevens Gómez
28	FW	PAR	Anderson Leguizamón (on loan from Club Guaraní)
29	MF	PAR	Octavio Alfonso (on loan from Club Guaraní)
30	MF	PAR	Pablo Ayala
31	DF	ARG	Brian Blasi
33	DF	PAR	Rodrigo Alborno
36	DF	PAR	Carlos Giménez
37	FW	ARG	Mauricio Roldán (on loan from Banfield)
38	MF	PAR	Gustavo Manzur
40	FW	PAR	Estiven Pérez (on loan from Atlético Tembetary)

== Notable players ==
To appear in this section a player must have either:

- Played at least 125 games for the club.
- Set a club record or won an individual award while at the club.
- Been part of a national team at any time.
- Played in the first division of any other football association (outside of Paraguay).
- Played in a continental and/or intercontinental competition.

2010's

- (Brazil) Josías Paulo Cardoso Júnior (2012)
