= Estadio Parque del Guairá =

Football stadium in Paraguay

- Interactive map of Estadio Parque del Guairá
- Address: Villarrica; Paraguay
- Coordinates: 25.76351°S 56.43941°W
- Capacity: 11,000
- Field size: 105 × 68 m

Tenant
- Guaireña FC

The Estadio Parque del Guairá is a football stadium in Paraguay located in the northern access of the city of Villarrica, on Route PY-08. It has a capacity for 11,000 seats and is the home venue of Primera División club, Guaireña FC.
The stadium belongs to the Government of Guairá and is co-administered with the Liga Guaireña de Fútbol, it was remodeled between 2012 and 2013 and its capacity expanded to 11,000 spectators.
