= Estadio Villa Alegre =

Football stadium in Encarnación, Paraguay

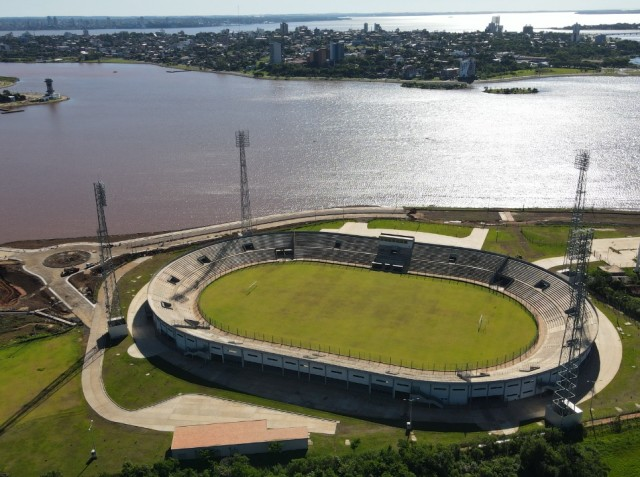
- Interactive map of Estadio Villa Alegre
- Full name: Estadio Villa Alegre
- Location: Encarnación, Paraguay
- Coordinates: 27°19′19.8″S 55°50′36.2″W
- Owner: Encarnación Football League
- Capacity: 16,000
- Surface: Grass
- Field size: 105 x 68 m

Construction
- Built: 2016–2022 (new stadium)
- Opened: 1960s (old stadium); 4 November 2022 (new stadium)
- Closed: 2008 (old stadium)
- Demolished: 2010 (old stadium)

Tenants
- Encarnación F.C. Deportivo Itapuense

Estadio Villa Alegre is a football stadium located in Encarnación, Paraguay. The stadium has a current spectator capacity of 16,000 people, with plans to expand to 30,000 at a later stage. It primarily serves as the home ground for the Liga Encarnacena de Fútbol (Encarnación Football League) and its club Encarnación F.C., and on occasions it has also hosted pre-season and league matches for other Paraguayan clubs.

== History ==
The stadium was first opened in the decade of the 1960s with a capacity for 5,000 people and was located in Encarnación's "lower zone" (zona baja), close to the Paraná River. The plot of land on which it was originally located, named Villa Alegre, was owned by the Physical Culture Association, an entity dependent on the Paraguayan Ministry of Education and Worship, and was donated to the Encarnación Football League in 1956. The old stadium was set to be demolished due to the works for the completion of the Yacyretá Dam project which involved the flooding of the lower zones of Encarnación, and the last match there was played on 24 October 2008. Demolition began in January 2010, making way for the construction of the Costanera Avenue.

The stadium was relocated to the Chaipé neighborhood and rebuilt by the Yacyretá Binational Entity (EBY) as compensation for the loss of the former stadium. Construction of the current structure was divided into three stages: the first one, which began in 2016 and ended in 2019, contemplated reaching a capacity of 8,000 spectators, whilst the second one which ended in 2022 brought the stadium to its current capacity of 16,000, although it was originally planned to raise capacity to 28,000 spectators.

The new stadium was officially opened on 4 November 2022 with the final match of the 2022 Copa Paraguay between Nacional and Sportivo Ameliano.
