= 2025 Supercopa Paraguay =

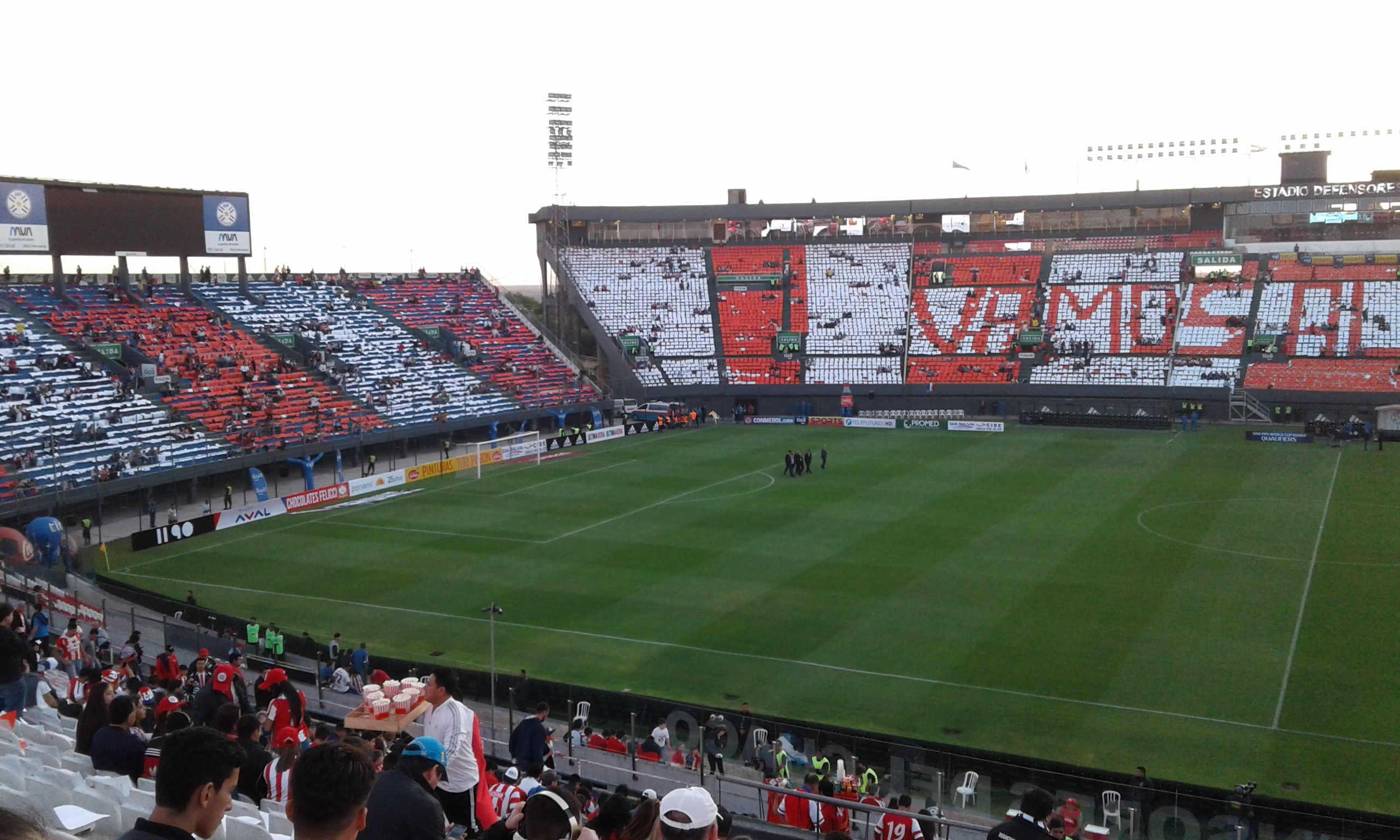
- Estadio Defensores del Chaco hosted the match.
General Caballero (JLM)	Cerro Porteño
2	5
- Date: 6 December 2025
- Venue: Estadio Defensores del Chaco, Asunción
- Referee: Mario Díaz de Vivar

The 2025 Supercopa Paraguay was the fifth edition of the Supercopa Paraguay, Paraguay's football super cup. It was held on 6 December 2025 between the 2025 Copa Paraguay champions General Caballero (JLM) and Cerro Porteño, the 2025 Copa de Primera best-ranked champions in the aggregate table. This match was the closing event of the 2025 season of Paraguayan football.

Cerro Porteño were the champions, winning their first Supercopa Paraguay title after defeating General Caballero (JLM) 5–2 in the match. The winning side was awarded a monetary prize of one billion Paraguayan guaraníes.

== Teams ==
The Supercopa Paraguay is contested by two teams: the champions of the Copa Paraguay and the División de Honor (Apertura or Clausura) champions with the best record in the aggregate table of the season.

This was the first time General Caballero (JLM) played the Supercopa, having also won the Copa Paraguay for the first time ever.

Team	Qualification	Previous appearances (bold indicates winners)
General Caballero (JLM)	2025 Copa Paraguay champions	None
Cerro Porteño	2025 Copa de Primera champions with better record in aggregate table	1 (2021)

== Details ==
6 December 2025
18:00 UTC−3

General Caballero (JLM)	2–5	Cerro Porteño
Cáceres 20'; C. González 45+3'	Report	Morel 2'; C. Domínguez 24', 71'; Cáceres 53' (o.g.); Aliseda 67'

Estadio Defensores del Chaco, Asunción
Referee: Mario Díaz de Vivar

**General Caballero (JLM)**	**Cerro Porteño**

GK	1	(Paraguay) Luis Guillén
RB	6	(Paraguay) Miller Mareco
CB	14	(Paraguay) Alexis Rodas
CB	16	(Paraguay) Jorge González		(substituted off) 7'
LB	4	(Paraguay) Gabriel Molinas
DM	8	(Paraguay) Silvio Torales	(yellow card) 90+2'
RM	10	(Paraguay) Sebastián Arce (c)	(yellow card) 70'	(substituted off) 83'
CM	28	(Paraguay) Juan Franco	(yellow card) 46'	(substituted off) 82'
CM	25	(Paraguay) Daniel Aguilera		(substituted off) 65'
LM	29	(Paraguay) Osmar Giménez		(substituted off) 65'
CF	9	(Paraguay) Clementino González
Substitutes:
GK	12	(Brazil) Tales
DF	5	(Paraguay) Luis Cáceres		(substituted on) 7'
DF	27	(Paraguay) Ever Fernández
MF	18	(Paraguay) Jorge Armoa		(substituted on) 65'
MF	21	(Paraguay) Matías Schabus
MF	22	(Paraguay) Víctor Argüello
MF	24	(Paraguay) Gabriel Espínola
MF	32	(Argentina) Gaspar Vega		(substituted on) 83'
FW	7	(Paraguay) Marcelo Ferreira
FW	19	(Argentina) Julián López		(substituted on) 82'
FW	30	(Paraguay) Estifen Díaz		(substituted on) 65'
Manager:
(Paraguay) Humberto Ovelar

GK	1	(Argentina) Alexis Martín Arias
RB	2	(Uruguay) Fabricio Domínguez
CB	23	(Paraguay) Gustavo Velázquez (c)		(substituted off) 46'
CB	22	(Argentina) Matías Pérez
LB	15	(Paraguay) Blas Riveros
CM	5	(Paraguay) Jorge Morel
CM	30	(Paraguay) Gastón Giménez		(substituted off) 78'
RM	11	(Paraguay) Juan Iturbe
LM	10	(Paraguay) Cecilio Domínguez	(yellow card) 72'	(substituted off) 86'
CF	31	(Argentina) Ignacio Aliseda		(substituted off) 89'
CF	21	(Argentina) Sergio Araujo		(substituted off) 78'
Substitutes:
GK	25	(Paraguay) Gatito Fernández
DF	13	(Argentina) Guillermo Benítez
DF	14	(Paraguay) Lucas Quintana		(substituted on) 46'
DF	18	(Paraguay) Bruno Valdez
MF	19	(Paraguay) Carlos Franco	(yellow card) 90+1'	(substituted on) 89'
MF	20	(Paraguay) Wilder Viera
MF	26	(Paraguay) Robert Piris Da Motta		(substituted on) 78'
MF	33	(Paraguay) Rodrigo Gómez
MF	37	(Paraguay) Darío Espínola
FW	17	(Paraguay) Gabriel Aguayo		(substituted on) 86'
FW	27	(Argentina) Jonathan Torres		(substituted on) 78'
FW	40	(Paraguay) Mauricio De Carvalho
Manager:
(Uruguay) Jorge Bava

Assistant referees:
Julio Aranda
Nancy Fernández
Fourth official:
Álvaro Giménez
Video assistant referee:
Ulises Mereles
Assistant video assistant referee:
Héctor Balbuena

**Match rules**

- 90 minutes.
- Penalty shoot-out if scores still level.
- Twelve named substitutes.
- Maximum of five substitutions.
