= 2025 Copa Paraguay =

Tournament details
- Country: Paraguay
- Dates: 27 May – 16 November 2025
- Teams: 75

Final positions
- Champions: General Caballero (JLM) (1st title)
- Runners-up: 2 de Mayo
- Third place: Nacional
- Fourth place: Guaraní
- Copa Libertadores: 2 de Mayo

Tournament statistics
- Matches played: 77
- Goals scored: 222 (2.88 per match)

The 2025 Copa Paraguay was the seventh edition of the Copa Paraguay, Paraguay's domestic football cup competition organized by the Paraguayan Football Association (APF). The competition began on 27 May and ended on 16 November 2025. General Caballero (JLM) were the champions, winning their first Copa Paraguay title after defeating 2 de Mayo 1–0 in the final. Although with this title General Caballero qualified for the 2025 Supercopa Paraguay against the Primera División champions with better record in the aggregate table, the berth to the 2026 Copa Libertadores was awarded to the runners-up 2 de Mayo due to General Caballero's relegation to División Intermedia.

Aside from qualification for the Supercopa Paraguay, the Copa Paraguay champion was also awarded a monetary prize of 1 billion Paraguayan guaraníes (Gs). The runners-up 2 de Mayo were awarded Gs. 250,000,000, Nacional, as third-placed team earned Gs. 100,000,000, and the fourth-placed team Guaraní received Gs. 50,000,000.

Libertad were the defending champions, but they were defeated by Guaraní in the round of 16.

== Teams ==
The 2025 edition had a total of 75 participating teams, 12 from Primera División, 16 from División Intermedia, 18 from Primera B, 12 from Primera C, and the champions from each of the 17 departments of Paraguay, representing the Unión de Fútbol del Interior (UFI):

Primera División

- 2 de Mayo
- Cerro Porteño
- Deportivo Recoleta
- General Caballero (JLM)
- Guaraní
- Libertad
- Nacional
- Olimpia
- Sportivo Ameliano
- Sportivo Luqueño
- Sportivo Trinidense
- Tembetary

División Intermedia

- 12 de Junio
- Deportivo Capiatá
- Deportivo Santaní
- Encarnación
- Fernando de la Mora
- Guaireña
- Guaraní (F)
- Independiente (CG)
- Pastoreo
- Resistencia
- River Plate
- Rubio Ñu
- San Lorenzo
- Sol de América
- Sportivo Carapeguá
- Tacuary

Primera B

- 3 de Febrero (RB)
- 3 de Noviembre
- 12 de Octubre (I)
- 24 de Setiembre
- 29 de Setiembre
- Atlántida
- Atlético Colegiales
- Benjamín Aceval
- Cristóbal Colón (JAS)
- Fulgencio Yegros
- General Díaz
- Martín Ledesma
- Olimpia (Itá)
- Presidente Hayes
- Silvio Pettirossi
- Sport Colombia
- Sportivo Iteño
- Sportivo Limpeño

Primera C

- 1 de Marzo (FDM)
- 12 de Octubre (SD)
- Atlético Juventud
- Capitán Figari
- Cristóbal Colón (Ñ)
- Deportivo Pinozá
- General Caballero (CG)
- General Caballero (ZC)
- Humaitá
- Oriental
- Pilcomayo
- Sport Colonial

UFI

- Nacional (Yby Yaú) (Concepción)
- 29 de Junio (San Pedro)
- 1 de Enero (Cordillera)
- Torres Cué (Guairá)
- 10 de Mayo (Caaguazú)
- 14 de Mayo (FY) (Caazapá)
- Sportivo San Pedro (Itapúa)
- Libertad (Misiones)
- 15 de Mayo Ypoá (Paraguarí)
- Deportivo Minga Guazú (Alto Paraná)
- Independiente (JAS) (Central)
- Sportivo Oliveño (Ñeembucú)
- Deportivo 1 de Marzo (Amambay)
- General Artigas (Canindeyú)
- Deportivo Unión (Presidente Hayes)
- Fortín Nanawa (Boquerón)
- Olimpic (Alto Paraguay)

== First stage ==
47 clubs competed in the first stage, those being the ones from Primera B, Primera C and UFI, which were drawn into 22 single-match ties and a triangular group featuring three UFI clubs. The Primera B and Primera C clubs were drawn against a club from their same league, whilst the UFI clubs were paired according to geographical proximity. The draw for the first three stages was held on 28 April 2025 and matches in this round were played from 27 May to 26 June 2025.

27 May 2025	Presidente Hayes	1–3	12 de Octubre (I)	Asunción
16:30 UTC−3	Gavilán 54'	Report	C. González 65'; Pacher 90'; Fernández 90+5' (pen.)	Stadium: Ricardo Gregor; Referee: Fabio Villalba
Note: Match suspended at halftime due to poor weather. It was resumed on 25 June 2025, 14:00 local time.

28 May 2025	Capitán Figari	0–4	Sport Colonial	Capiatá
14:00 UTC−3		Report	Alfonso 43', 83'; Cubilla 66'; Marín 79'	Stadium: Enrique Soler; Referee: Óscar Velázquez

28 May 2025	Sportivo Oliveño	2–2 (2–1 p)	Libertad (Misiones)	Encarnación
16:30 UTC−3	Olivera 53'; Benítez 89'	Report	D. Cristaldo 32'; Giménez 72'	Stadium: Villa Alegre; Referee: Francisco Osorio
	Penalties
	Benítez (penalty scored); Díaz (penalty scored); Vargas (penalty missed); Caballero (penalty missed)		(penalty scored) D. Cristaldo; (penalty missed) Riveros; (penalty missed) Chamorro; (penalty missed) G. Cristaldo; (penalty missed) Obregón

28 May 2025	Sportivo San Pedro	2–1	14 de Mayo (FY)	Encarnación
19:00 UTC−3	Venialgo 80'; J. Lugo 87' (pen.)	Report	Caballero 53'	Stadium: Villa Alegre; Referee: Basilio Jara

29 May 2025	Cristóbal Colón (JAS)	4–1	29 de Setiembre	Areguá
13:00 UTC−3	Mau. Rodríguez 3'; García 30'; Guillén 70'; I. González 72'	Report	Maciel 42'	Stadium: Próculo Cortázar; Referee: Samuel Morales

29 May 2025	24 de Setiembre	3–3 (4–2 p)	Fulgencio Yegros	Areguá
15:30 UTC−3	Salinas 47'; Roa 54'; Quintana 86'	Report	Arrúa 53'; Ayala 62'; Paniagua 90+5'	Stadium: Próculo Cortázar; Referee: Nelson Palma
	Penalties
	Meza (penalty scored); Quintana (penalty scored); Giménez (penalty scored); Cáceres (penalty scored)		(penalty missed) Ayala; (penalty scored) Arrúa; (penalty scored) Paredes; (penalty missed) Amarilla

29 May 2025	Sport Colombia	0–2	Atlántida	Villa Hayes
18:00 UTC−3		Report	G. Franco 30'; E. Galeano 81'	Stadium: Facundo de León Fossati; Referee: Ángel Fleytas

3 June 2025	Atlético Colegiales	0–1	General Díaz	Asunción
16:30 UTC−3		Report	Ruiz Díaz 89'	Stadium: Emiliano Ghezzi; Referee: José Armoa

3 June 2025	15 de Mayo Ypoá	1–3	Torres Cué	Carapeguá
19:00 UTC−3	É. González 70'	Report	Ávalos 7', 45+2'; D. Ruiz Díaz 50'	Stadium: Municipal; Referee: Fernando Villalba

4 June 2025	Humaitá	7–1	Cristóbal Colón (Ñ)	Villa Hayes
16:30 UTC−3	Silva 7' (o.g.); Garay 19'; Rolón 22'; Melgarejo 33'; Cardozo 81', 83'; Castro 85'	Report	Ortiz 36'	Stadium: Isidro Roussillón; Referee: Ángel Fleytas

4 June 2025	Benjamín Aceval	1–0	3 de Noviembre	Villa Hayes
19:00 UTC−3	González 55' (pen.)	Report		Stadium: Isidro Roussillón; Referee: Carlos Figueredo

11 June 2025	Deportivo Pinozá	0–1	Atlético Juventud	San Lorenzo
16:30 UTC−3		Report	Lovera 66' (pen.)	Stadium: Gunther Vogel; Referee: Édgar Galeano

11 June 2025	General Caballero (CG)	1–1 (5–4 p)	12 de Octubre (SD)	San Lorenzo
19:00 UTC−3	Arrúa 85' (pen.)	Report	Allende 10'	Stadium: Gunther Vogel; Referee: José Franco
	Penalties
	Ríos (penalty scored); Arrúa (penalty missed); Lezcano (penalty scored); Florencio (penalty scored); Florentín (penalty scored); Garay (penalty scored)		(penalty scored) Matta; (penalty scored) Riquelme; (penalty missed) Romero; (penalty scored) Cubilla; (penalty scored) Morel; (penalty missed) Ramos

12 June 2025	Deportivo 1 de Marzo	0–4	Nacional (Yby Yaú)	San Estanislao
13:00 UTC−3		Report	Gómez 38'; Moreno 67'; Cardozo 80'; López 89'	Stadium: Juan José Vázquez; Referee: Zulma Quiñónez

12 June 2025	General Artigas	0–0 (3–2 p)	29 de Junio	San Estanislao
15:30 UTC−3		Report		Stadium: Juan José Vázquez; Referee: Pedro Baranda
	Penalties
	Gavilán (penalty scored); Gómez (penalty scored); Paredes (penalty scored); P. Benítez (penalty missed)		(penalty missed) Valiente; (penalty scored) Zotelo; (penalty missed) Servín; (penalty scored) Rojas; (penalty missed) Ferreira

17 June 2025	3 de Febrero (RB)	1–3	Sportivo Limpeño	Asunción
16:30 UTC−3	Duarte 55'	Report	Echeverría 50'; A. González 88' (pen.); Mendieta 89'	Stadium: Ricardo Gregor; Referee: Fredy Hermosilla

17 June 2025	Pilcomayo	2–2 (5–3 p)	General Caballero (ZC)	Asunción
19:00 UTC−3	Gamarra 63', 87' (pen.)	Report	Cañete 69'; F. Ferreira 72'	Stadium: Ricardo Gregor; Referee: Juan Jara
	Penalties
	Sosa (penalty scored); Oviedo (penalty scored); J. Ferreira (penalty scored); Juliadoza (penalty scored); Gamarra (penalty scored)		(penalty scored) Martínez; (penalty scored) Garay; (penalty scored) Centurión; (penalty missed) Ruiz Díaz

18 June 2025	10 de Mayo	0–3	Deportivo Minga Guazú	Caaguazú
13:00 UTC−3		Report	Vargas 8'; Frank 24'; Bóbeda 40'	Stadium: Liga Caaguazú; Referee: Zulma Quiñónez

18 June 2025	1 de Marzo (FDM)	2–2 (4–3 p)	Oriental	Asunción
15:30 UTC−3	Páez 60'; Alarcón 90+3'	Report	Speratti 35'; Bogado 56'	Stadium: Emiliano Ghezzi; Referee: Édgar Galeano
	Penalties
	Cornet (penalty missed); Villalba (penalty scored); Páez (penalty scored); Luayza (penalty scored); Bustamante (penalty scored)		(penalty scored) Martínez; (penalty scored) J. Castillo; (penalty scored) Rotela; (penalty missed) González; (penalty missed) Poggi

25 June 2025	Independiente (JAS)	0–1	1 de Enero	Asunción
15:30 UTC−3		Report	Insfrán 58'	Stadium: Ricardo Gregor; Referee: Juan Jara
Note: Match originally scheduled for 27 May 2025, 19:00 local time but suspended due to poor weather. It was rescheduled to 25 June.

26 June 2025	Silvio Pettirossi	3–1	Sportivo Iteño	Itá
13:00 UTC−3	E. Blanco 25'; C. Blanco 31'; Vera 42'	Report	Espinoza 72'	Stadium: Presbítero Manuel Gamarra; Referee: Ángel Fleytas
Note: Match originally scheduled for 19 June 2025, 13:00 local time but rescheduled to 26 June due to poor weather.

26 June 2025	Olimpia (Itá)	1–2	Martín Ledesma	Itá
15:30 UTC−3	D. An. Santacruz 9'	Report	López 48'; Chiuzano 54'	Stadium: Presbítero Manuel Gamarra; Referee: Óscar Barrios
Note: Match originally scheduled for 19 June 2025, 15:30 local time but rescheduled to 26 June due to poor weather.

=== Triangular group ===
Pos	Team	Pld	W	D	L	GF	GA	GD	Pts	Qualification
1	Deportivo Unión	2	1	1	0	3	0	+3	4	Advance to Second stage
2	Fortín Nanawa	2	1	0	1	4	3	+1	3	Advance to Second stage
3	Olimpic	2	0	1	1	0	4	−4	1	

Source: APF
Rules for classification: 1) Points, 2) Goal difference, 3) Goals for, 4) Drawing of lots.

9 June 2025	Deportivo Unión	3–0	Fortín Nanawa	Filadelfia
15:00 UTC−3	Brítez 17' (pen.); Ozuna 65', 84'	Report		Stadium: Departamental Paz del Chaco; Referee: Víctor Ruiz Díaz

11 June 2025	Olimpic	0–0	Deportivo Unión	Filadelfia
14:00 UTC−3		Report		Stadium: Departamental Paz del Chaco; Referee: Ángel Fleytas

13 June 2025	Fortín Nanawa	4–0	Olimpic	Filadelfia
15:00 UTC−3	Jo. Ayala 7'; Ju. Ayala 60'; Bareiro 89'; Alen 90' (o.g.)	Report		Stadium: Departamental Paz del Chaco; Referee: Juan Jara

== Second stage ==
The second stage matches were played from 8 July to 5 August 2025.

8 July 2025	Nacional (Yby Yaú)	0–2	Fernando de la Mora	San Estanislao
13:00 UTC−3		Report	Castro 58'; A. López 90+2'	Stadium: La Catedral; Referee: Juan Jara

8 July 2025	General Artigas	1–2	Benjamín Aceval	Villa Hayes
15:30 UTC−3	Paredes 41'	Report	M. González 9'; Quiñónez 70'	Stadium: Isidro Roussillón; Referee: Samuel Morales

8 July 2025	Humaitá	1–0	Independiente (CG)	Villa Hayes
18:00 UTC−3	Garay 17' (pen.)	Report		Stadium: Isidro Roussillón; Referee: César Rolón

9 July 2025	24 de Setiembre	4–0	1 de Marzo (FDM)	Areguá
15:30 UTC−3	Samaniego 18'; Salinas 23'; Quintana 25'; Delvalle 62'	Report		Stadium: Próculo Cortázar; Referee: Fabio Villalba

9 July 2025	Sport Colonial	0–6	Guaraní (F)	Asunción
18:00 UTC−3		Report	Núñez 7'; Arévalo 10'; Balbuena 40', 87'; Díaz 63'; Viveros 81'	Stadium: Ricardo Gregor; Referee: Carlos Figueredo

10 July 2025	Atlético Juventud	1–2	Pastoreo	Caaguazú
13:00 UTC−3	Caballero 45+1'	Report	Sanabria 38'; Heinze 66'	Stadium: Liga Caaguazú; Referee: Nelson Palma

10 July 2025	Deportivo Minga Guazú	2–2 (4–2 p)	Rubio Ñu	Caaguazú
15:30 UTC−3	Arrúa 14'; Cabaña 43'	Report	J. Barrios 48'; Méndez 68'	Stadium: Liga Caaguazú; Referee: Jhonatan González
	Penalties
	Brizuela (penalty scored); Báez (penalty scored); Castro (penalty scored); Fleitas (penalty missed); Vargas (penalty scored)		(penalty scored) López; (penalty missed) J. Barrios; (penalty scored) Ramos; (penalty missed) Almada

10 July 2025	Deportivo Unión	1–5	San Lorenzo	Villa Hayes
18:00 UTC−3	Galeano 10'	Report	Barrios 1'; Ovejero 13', 45+1', 61'; Rivas 71'	Stadium: Facundo de León Fossati; Referee: José Armoa

15 July 2025	Pilcomayo	0–3	1 de Enero	Asunción
13:00 UTC−3		Report	Mi. Martínez 13'; Ma. Martínez 29', 56'	Stadium: Tomás Beggan Correa; Referee: Fredy Hermosilla

15 July 2025	General Díaz	0–1	Deportivo Santaní	San Estanislao
15:30 UTC−3		Report	Santander 5'	Stadium: La Catedral; Referee: Nelson Palma

15 July 2025	Atlántida	2–3	Resistencia	Asunción
18:00 UTC−3	Pérez 57', 75'	Report	Colmán 47'; Romero 51'; Vera 90+4' (pen.)	Stadium: Tomás Beggan Correa; Referee: César Rolón

16 July 2025	Sportivo Oliveño	1–5	Sportivo Limpeño	Encarnación
13:00 UTC−3	Nel. Benítez 70' (pen.)	Report	Maciel 1', 37'; Pereira 39' (pen.); Gamarra 67'; Echeverría 86'	Stadium: Villa Alegre; Referee: Óscar Velázquez

16 July 2025	General Caballero (CG)	0–4	Encarnación	Encarnación
15:30 UTC−3		Report	Casanova 38'; M. Caballero 60' (pen.), 89'; S. Ayala 88'	Stadium: Villa Alegre; Referee: Víctor Robles

17 July 2025	Torres Cué	1–2	River Plate	Villarrica
13:00 UTC−3	Aguilera 48'	Report	Flores 45+1'; Núñez 60'	Stadium: Parque del Guairá; Referee: Juan Jara

17 July 2025	Silvio Pettirossi	0–0 (5–4 p)	Deportivo Capiatá	Areguá
15:30 UTC−3		Report		Stadium: Próculo Cortázar; Referee: Carlos Figueredo
	Penalties
	Amarilla (penalty scored); Cañete (penalty scored); Rolón (penalty scored); Vera (penalty scored); Martínez (penalty scored)		(penalty scored) Oviedo; (penalty scored) Verdún; (penalty scored) Arce; (penalty missed) Alfonso; (penalty scored) Acuña

17 July 2025	12 de Octubre (I)	3–0	Guaireña	Villarrica
18:00 UTC−3	Vera 12'; Pacher 71'; Mosqueda 81'	Report		Stadium: Parque del Guairá; Referee: Jhonatan González

23 July 2025	Sportivo San Pedro	0–7	Sol de América	Carapeguá
13:00 UTC−3		Report	Coronel 7', 45+1', 49'; Cuenca 52'; Franco 61'; Rivarola 68', 83'	Stadium: Municipal; Referee: Fredy Hermosilla

23 July 2025	Fortín Nanawa	1–3	Tacuary	Filadelfia
15:30 UTC−3	Ortiz 49'	Report	Estigarribia 52'; Roa 64'; Ramallo 90+2'	Stadium: Departamental Paz del Chaco; Referee: César Rolón

23 July 2025	Cristóbal Colón (JAS)	0–2	Sportivo Carapeguá	Carapeguá
18:00 UTC−3		Report	Arce 51', 68'	Stadium: Municipal; Referee: Álvaro Giménez

5 August 2025	Martín Ledesma	0–2	12 de Junio	Villa Hayes
18:30 UTC−3		Report	Morales 18'; Ramírez 40' (o.g.)	Stadium: Facundo de León Fossati; Referee: Víctor Robles
Note: Match originally scheduled for 24 July 2025, 18:00 local time but suspended due to poor weather. It was rescheduled to 5 August.

== Bracket ==
Third stage
Fernando de la Mora	0
Olimpia	3
Sportivo Carapeguá	0
Tembetary	1
Encarnación	1
2 de Mayo	2
Deportivo Minga Guazú (p)	1 (5)
Sportivo Luqueño	1 (4)
24 de Setiembre	0
Libertad	5
Benjamín Aceval	0
Guaraní	3
River Plate	1
Deportivo Santaní	0
Silvio Pettirossi	0
Resistencia	2
Pastoreo	0
Cerro Porteño	3
Sol de América	1
Deportivo Recoleta	0
12 de Junio	0 (1)
Sportivo Ameliano (p)	0 (4)
Humaitá	2
General Caballero (JLM)	4
Sportivo Limpeño	0
Sportivo Trinidense	4
1 de Enero	0
Nacional	5
12 de Octubre (I)	3
Guaraní (F)	1
San Lorenzo	1 (4)
Tacuary (p)	1 (5)

Round of 16
Olimpia	2 (2)
Tembetary (p)	2 (4)
2 de Mayo	2
Deportivo Minga Guazú	1
Libertad	2 (3)
Guaraní (p)	2 (4)
River Plate (p)	1 (3)
Resistencia	1 (2)
Cerro Porteño	1
Sol de América	0
Sportivo Ameliano	0 (3)
General Caballero (JLM) (p)	0 (4)
Sportivo Trinidense	0 (2)
Nacional	0 (4)
12 de Octubre (I)	1
Tacuary	0

Quarter-finals
Tembetary	0
2 de Mayo	2
Guaraní	2
River Plate	0
Cerro Porteño	0 (3)
General Caballero (JLM) (p)	0 (4)
Nacional	2
12 de Octubre (I)	0

Semi-finals
2 de Mayo	1
Guaraní	0
General Caballero (JLM)	2
Nacional	1

Final
2 de Mayo	0
General Caballero (JLM)	1
Third place play-off
Guaraní	0
Nacional	4

== Third stage ==
The third stage matches were played from 12 August to 3 September 2025.

12 August 2025	River Plate	1–0	Deportivo Santaní	Carapeguá
13:30 UTC−3	Torres 66'	Report		Stadium: Municipal; Referee: Carlos Figueredo

12 August 2025	Sportivo Limpeño	0–4	Sportivo Trinidense	Asunción
16:00 UTC−3		Report	Gaona 9' (pen.); Cano 21', 37'; Villalba 30'	Stadium: Ricardo Gregor; Referee: José Méndez

12 August 2025	1 de Enero	0–5	Nacional	Carapeguá
18:30 UTC−3		Report	González 44', 45'; Benítez 56' (pen.); Almeida 78'; Bailone 89'	Stadium: Municipal; Referee: Alipio Colmán

13 August 2025	Deportivo Minga Guazú	1–1 (5–4 p)	Sportivo Luqueño	Juan León Mallorquín
18:30 UTC−3	Castro 52'	Report	Comas 90+2'	Stadium: Ka'arendy; Referee: Giancarlos Juliadoza
	Penalties
	D. Brizuela (penalty missed); Báez (penalty scored); González (penalty scored); Castro (penalty missed); Bóbeda (penalty scored); Díaz (penalty scored); Frank (penalty scored)		(penalty scored) Comas; (penalty scored) Pérez; (penalty scored) Á. Brizuela; (penalty missed) Á. Benítez; (penalty missed) Ocampos; (penalty scored) Gamarra; (penalty missed) Escobar

26 August 2025	Encarnación	1–2	2 de Mayo	Pedro Juan Caballero
18:30 UTC−3	Sgarrino 28'	Report	Ruiz Díaz 90+2'; Ayala 90+4' (o.g.)	Stadium: Río Parapití; Referee: Álvaro Giménez

27 August 2025	Silvio Pettirossi	0–2	Resistencia	Asunción
13:30 UTC−3		Report	Castellano 37'; Colmán 88'	Stadium: Ricardo Gregor; Referee: Juan López

27 August 2025	Humaitá	2–4	General Caballero (JLM)	Asunción
16:00 UTC−3	Cardozo 11' (pen.); González 45+2'	Report	Vega 26'; Ferreira 29'; Díaz 41'; Roa 50'	Stadium: Ricardo Gregor; Referee: Carlos Figueredo

27 August 2025	Pastoreo	0–3	Cerro Porteño	Itauguá
18:30 UTC−3		Report	Amarilla 9'; Carrizo 49'; Aliseda 79'	Stadium: Luis Salinas; Referee: Giancarlos Juliadoza

28 August 2025	Benjamín Aceval	0–3	Guaraní	Asunción
16:00 UTC−3		Report	Torales 48'; Maidana 66'; Miño 82'	Stadium: Martín Torres; Referee: Alipio Colmán

28 August 2025	24 de Setiembre	0–5	Libertad	Asunción
18:30 UTC−3		Report	M. Fernández 27', 50'; Villalba 75'; Recalde 77'; N. Giménez 83'	Stadium: La Arboleda; Referee: Dionicio Cristaldo

2 September 2025	12 de Octubre (I)	3–1	Guaraní (F)	Carapeguá
13:30 UTC−3	E. Vera 9', 15'; Roa 48'	Report	Benítez 28'	Stadium: Municipal; Referee: Giancarlos Juliadoza

2 September 2025	Sol de América	1–0	Deportivo Recoleta	Asunción
16:00 UTC−3	Coronel 80' (pen.)	Report		Stadium: Emiliano Ghezzi; Referee: Juan López

2 September 2025	Sportivo Carapeguá	0–1	Tembetary	Carapeguá
18:30 UTC−3		Report	Marotta 6'	Stadium: Municipal; Referee: Carlos Figueredo

3 September 2025	San Lorenzo	1–1 (4–5 p)	Tacuary	Asunción
13:30 UTC−3	Duarte 13'	Report	Reinoso 78'	Stadium: Ricardo Gregor; Referee: Dionicio Cristaldo
	Penalties
	Ovejero (penalty scored); Barrios (penalty scored); Fretes (penalty scored); Rivas (penalty scored); García (penalty missed); Aveiro (penalty scored); Suárez (penalty missed)		(penalty scored) Blanco; (penalty scored) Estigarribia; (penalty scored) Godoy; (penalty missed) Zárate; (penalty scored) Giménez; (penalty scored) Franco; (penalty scored) Reinoso

3 September 2025	Fernando de la Mora	0–3	Olimpia	Villa Hayes
16:00 UTC−3		Report	Barone 24'; Pérez 43'; López 88'	Stadium: Facundo de León Fossati; Referee: Álvaro Giménez

3 September 2025	12 de Junio	0–0 (1–4 p)	Sportivo Ameliano	Asunción
18:30 UTC−3		Report		Stadium: Ricardo Gregor; Referee: Alipio Colmán
	Penalties
	Otálvaro (penalty missed); Gómez (penalty missed); Fernández (penalty scored)		(penalty scored) Vera; (penalty scored) Valdez; (penalty scored) Sanguina; (penalty scored) Sarquis

== Round of 16 ==
Matches in this round were played from 24 September to 7 October 2025.

24 September 2025	Sportivo Ameliano	0–0 (3–4 p)	General Caballero (JLM)	Villarrica
16:30 UTC−3		Report		Stadium: Parque del Guairá; Referee: David Ojeda
	Penalties
	Vera (penalty scored); Moreira (penalty scored); Valdez (penalty missed); Sarquis (penalty missed); Aranda (penalty scored)		(penalty missed) Sánchez; (penalty scored) Argüello; (penalty scored) Ferreira; (penalty scored) Schabus; (penalty scored) Franco

24 September 2025	Olimpia	2–2 (2–4 p)	Tembetary	Itauguá
19:00 UTC−3	Ferreira 26'; Martínez 40'	Report	Esteche 9'; Charpentier 24'	Stadium: Luis Salinas; Referee: Carlos Benítez
	Penalties
	Redes (penalty scored); Ferreira (penalty missed); Ortiz (penalty missed); Barreto (penalty scored)		(penalty scored) Charpentier; (penalty scored) Barrios; (penalty scored) Silva; (penalty scored) Colmán

25 September 2025	2 de Mayo	2–1	Deportivo Minga Guazú	Pedro Juan Caballero
15:30 UTC−3	Acosta 8', 35'	Report	Duarte 45+4' (pen.)	Stadium: Río Parapití; Referee: Carlos Figueredo

25 September 2025	River Plate	1–1 (3–2 p)	Resistencia	Asunción
18:30 UTC−3	M. González 82'	Report	Castellano 30'	Stadium: Emiliano Ghezzi; Referee: Aldo Quiñónez
	Penalties
	Torres (penalty scored); Cristaldo (penalty missed); M. González (penalty scored); Marciante (penalty scored)		(penalty missed) Vera; (penalty missed) Colmán; (penalty scored) Castellano; (penalty scored) Mencia; (penalty missed) Báez

1 October 2025	12 de Octubre (I)	1–0	Tacuary	Asunción
16:30 UTC−3	Pacher 65'	Report		Stadium: Ricardo Gregor; Referee: Carlos Benítez

1 October 2025	Libertad	2–2 (3–4 p)	Guaraní	Capiatá
19:00 UTC−3	Melgarejo 24', 70'	Report	Torales 7'; Maiz 40'	Stadium: Erico Galeano; Referee: Derlis Benítez
	Penalties
	Espinoza (penalty scored); Á. Cardozo (penalty scored); Franco (penalty missed); Vera (penalty scored); Aguilar (penalty missed)		(penalty scored) L. Martínez; (penalty scored) F. Fernández; (penalty missed) Patiño; (penalty scored) Zaracho; (penalty scored) Rodríguez

2 October 2025	Sportivo Trinidense	0–0 (2–4 p)	Nacional	San Lorenzo
19:00 UTC−3		Report		Stadium: Gunther Vogel; Referee: Giancarlos Juliadoza
	Penalties
	Camacho (penalty scored); Giménez (penalty scored); C. Benítez (penalty missed); De la Cruz (penalty missed)		(penalty scored) Arrúa; (penalty missed) H. Benítez; (penalty scored) Franco; (penalty scored) Valdez; (penalty scored) Alfaro

7 October 2025	Cerro Porteño	1–0	Sol de América	Itauguá
19:00 UTC−3	Torres 10' (pen.)	Report		Stadium: Luis Salinas; Referee: Alipio Colmán

== Quarter-finals ==
Matches in this round were played from 21 to 23 October 2025.

21 October 2025	Tembetary	0–2	2 de Mayo	San Lorenzo
18:30 UTC−3		Report	Molinas 55'; M. Acosta 90+5'	Stadium: Gunther Vogel; Referee: Derlis López

22 October 2025	Nacional	2–0	12 de Octubre (I)	Asunción
17:00 UTC−3	H. Benítez 38'; Valdez 76'	Report		Stadium: La Arboleda; Referee: Mario Díaz de Vivar

22 October 2025	Guaraní	2–0	River Plate	Capiatá
19:30 UTC−3	Alfonso 21', 31'	Report		Stadium: Erico Galeano; Referee: Blas Romero

23 October 2025	Cerro Porteño	0–0 (3–4 p)	General Caballero (JLM)	Itauguá
18:30 UTC−3		Report		Stadium: Luis Salinas; Referee: Giancarlos Juliadoza
	Penalties
	Pérez (penalty scored); Aliseda (penalty scored); Torres (penalty missed); F. Domínguez (penalty scored); Carrizo (penalty missed)		(penalty scored) Arce; (penalty scored) González; (penalty scored) Torales; (penalty scored) Molinas

== Semi-finals ==
Both semi-final matches will be played on 5 November 2025.

5 November 2025	General Caballero (JLM)	2–1	Nacional	Asunción
17:30 UTC−3	Franco 9'; Arce 45'	Report	Espínola 89'	Stadium: La Arboleda; Referee: Juan Gabriel Benítez

5 November 2025	2 de Mayo	1–0	Guaraní	Villa Elisa
20:00 UTC−3	M. Acosta 67'	Report		Stadium: Luis Alfonso Giagni; Referee: David Ojeda

== Third place play-off ==
14 November 2025
18:30 UTC−3

Guaraní	0–4	Nacional
	Report	Prieto 7'; Bailone 14'; Franco 69'; Almeida 86'

Estadio Erico Galeano, Capiatá
Referee: Zulma Quiñónez

== Final ==
Estadio Río Parapití in Pedro Juan Caballero, 2 de Mayo's home stadium, was selected as the host for the final match following a draw held on 7 November 2025.

16 November 2025
18:00 UTC−3

2 de Mayo	0–1	General Caballero (JLM)
	Report	Mareco 49'

Estadio Río Parapití, Pedro Juan Caballero
Referee: Derlis Benítez

== See also ==
- 2025 Copa de Primera
- 2025 Paraguayan División Intermedia
