= 2025 Copa de Primera =

Paraguayan Primera División season

División de Honor
- Season: 2025
- Dates: 24 January – 30 November 2025
- Champions: Apertura: Libertad (26th title); Clausura: Cerro Porteño (35th title)
- Relegated: General Caballero (JLM); Tembetary
- Copa Libertadores: Cerro Porteño; Libertad; Guaraní; 2 de Mayo (via Copa Paraguay)
- Copa Sudamericana: Sportivo Trinidense; Nacional; Recoleta; Olimpia
- Matches: 264
- Goals: 629 (2.38 per match)
- Top goalscorer: Apertura: Gustavo Caballero and Juan Iturbe (9 goals each); Clausura: Six players (7 goals each)
- Biggest home win: Nacional 4–0 Spvo. Luqueño (17 May); Spvo. Luqueño 5–1 Tembetary (9 August); Guaraní 4–0 Olimpia (10 August); Guaraní 4–0 Gral. Caballero (31 August)
- Biggest away win: Gral. Caballero 0–5 Libertad (22 March); Tembetary 1–6 Cerro Porteño (31 May)
- Highest scoring: Libertad 5–2 Recoleta (2 February); Tembetary 1–6 Cerro Porteño (31 May); Spvo. Trinidense 4–3 Olimpia (13 July); Guaraní 3–4 Cerro Porteño (16 August); Gral. Caballero 5–2 Spvo. Luqueño (19 September)

The 2025 Copa de Primera (officially the Copa de Primera Tigo – ueno bank 2025 for sponsorship reasons) was the 91st season of the División de Honor, the top-flight professional football league in Paraguay. The season, which consisted of two tournaments (Apertura and Clausura), began on 24 January and ended on 30 November 2025. The fixture draw for the season was held on 9 December 2024.

In the Torneo Apertura, Libertad won its twenty-sixth league championship, clinching the title with a 1–0 win over 2 de Mayo on 1 June, the final matchday of the tournament. The Torneo Clausura was won by Cerro Porteño, who claimed their thirty-fifth league title after defeating Tembetary 2–0 on 30 November. Olimpia entered the season as defending champions, having won the 2024 Clausura tournament.

== Teams ==
Twelve teams competed in this season: the top ten teams in the relegation table of the 2024 season, and the top two teams in the 2024 Paraguayan División Intermedia: Deportivo Recoleta and Tembetary. Deportivo Recoleta, who rebranded to Recoleta Football Club for this season, returned to the top flight after 23 years, clinching promotion with a 2–0 win over Pastoreo on 22 September 2024, while Tembetary sealed their return to Primera División for the first time since 1997 by defeating Fernando de la Mora on 29 September 2024. The promoted teams replaced Sol de América and Tacuary, who ended in the bottom two places of the relegation table and were relegated to the second tier at the end of the previous season.

Pos.	Relegated from 2024 Copa de Primera
11th	Sol de América
12th	Tacuary

Pos.	Promoted from 2024 División Intermedia
1st	Recoleta
2nd	Tembetary

=== Stadia and locations ===
Locations of the 2025 Copa de Primera teams
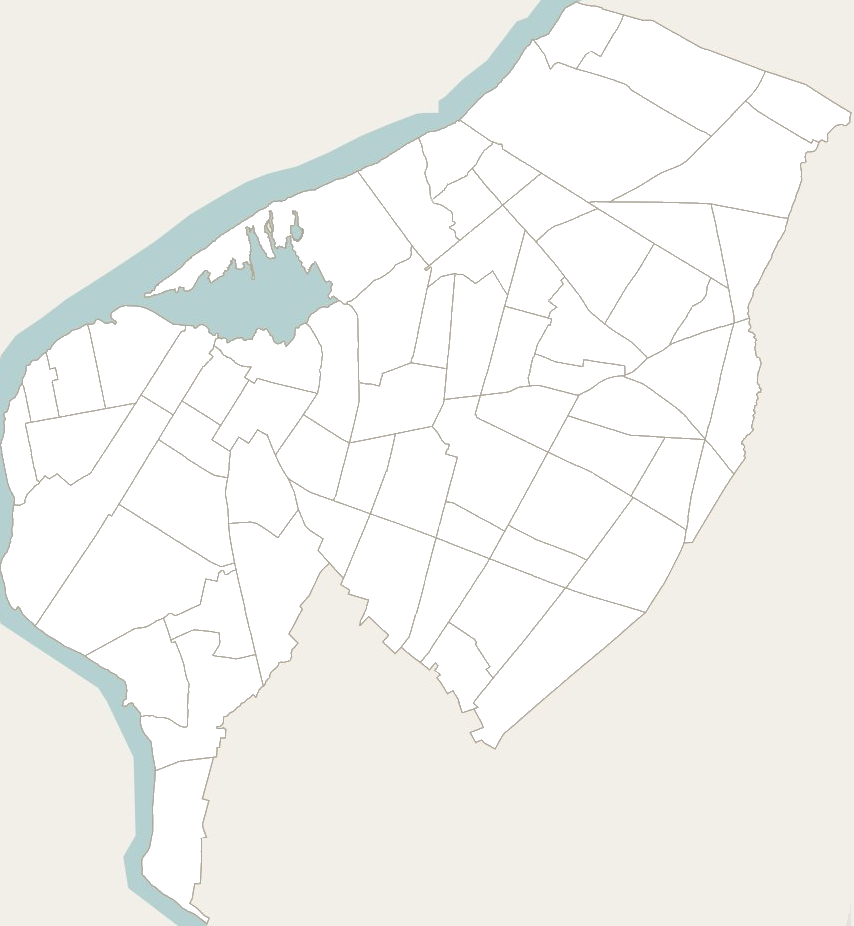
Locations of the 2025 Copa de Primera teams – Asunción

Team	City	Stadium (Note: Teams occasionally play home matches at Estadio Defensores del Chaco in Asunción.)	Capacity
2 de Mayo	Pedro Juan Caballero	Río Parapití	25,000
Cerro Porteño	Asunción	General Pablo Rojas	45,000
General Caballero (JLM)	Juan León Mallorquín	Ka'arendy	10,000
Guaraní	Asunción	Rogelio Livieres (Note: Guaraní and Olimpia played their home matches at several stadiums across the country since their regular stadiums were closed for construction or remodeling works.)	6,000
Libertad	Asunción	La Huerta	14,000
Nacional	Asunción	Arsenio Erico	7,500
Olimpia	Asunción	Osvaldo Domínguez Dibb	25,000
Recoleta	Asunción	Ricardo Gregor (Note: Used as home stadium for the season since Recoleta's stadium Estadio Roque Battilana did not meet APF requirements.)	4,000
Sportivo Ameliano	Villeta	Ameliano Villeta	7,000
Sportivo Luqueño	Itauguá	Luis Alberto Salinas (Note: Used as home stadium for the season since Sportivo Luqueño's stadium Estadio Feliciano Cáceres in Luque was closed for remodeling works.)	10,000
Sportivo Trinidense	Asunción	Martín Torres	3,000
Tembetary	Villa Elisa	Luis Alfonso Giagni (Note: Used as home stadium for the season since Tembetary's stadium Complejo Tembetary in Villa Elisa did not meet APF requirements.)	11,000

=== Personnel and kits ===
Team	Manager	Kit manufacturer	Main shirt sponsors
2 de Mayo	(Paraguay) Felipe Giménez	Kyrios	Zero Grau, Banco Continental, Fleming
Cerro Porteño	(Uruguay) Jorge Bava	Puma	Tigo, Ueno
General Caballero (JLM)	(Paraguay) Humberto Ovelar	Kappa	Sanatorio San Sebastián, Kia
Guaraní	(Argentina) Víctor Bernay	Kyrios	Tigo, Ueno, Aposta.La
Libertad	(Argentina) Pablo Guiñazú	Puma	Tigo
Nacional	(Paraguay) Pedro Sarabia	Kappa	Kia, Banco Continental, Coca-Cola, Santa Clara
Olimpia	(Paraguay) Ever Almeida	Nike	Tigo, Visión Banco
Recoleta	(Paraguay) Jorge González	Running Sport	Ueno, BYD, Universidad Central del Paraguay
Sportivo Ameliano	(Argentina) Roberto Nanni	Netanya Sport	Kia, Banco Continental, Ayres
Sportivo Luqueño	(Paraguay) Lucas Barrios	Kyrios	Comercial Vírgen del Rosario, Ueno, Betsson
Sportivo Trinidense	(Paraguay) José Arrúa	Lotto	Noroda, Lácteos Trébol, Chorti Beef, Ueno
Tembetary	(Paraguay) Luis Fernando Escobar	Temple	Kia, engineering, Banco Continental

=== Managerial changes ===
Team	Outgoing manager	Manner of departure	Date of vacancy	Position in table	Incoming manager	Date of appointment
Torneo Apertura
Cerro Porteño	(Paraguay) Carlos Jara Saguier	Change of role	28 November 2024	Pre-season	(Argentina) Diego Martínez	11 December 2024
General Caballero (JLM)	(Paraguay) Humberto García	End of contract	3 December 2024	Pre-season	(Paraguay) Troadio Duarte	4 December 2024
Sportivo Luqueño	(Argentina) Juan Pablo Pumpido	Resigned	1 February 2025	9th	(Paraguay) Gustavo Morínigo	3 February 2025
Nacional	(Argentina) Víctor Bernay	Resigned	2 February 2025	12th	(Paraguay) Pedro Sarabia	3 February 2025
General Caballero (JLM)	(Paraguay) Troadio Duarte	Sacked	4 April 2025	8th	(Uruguay) Sebastián Vázquez	6 April 2025
Olimpia	(Argentina) Martín Palermo	Sacked	10 April 2025	5th	(Paraguay) Aureliano Torres (Note: Caretaker manager.)	10 April 2025
Tembetary	(Paraguay) Arturo Villasanti	Resigned	10 April 2025	9th	(Argentina) Christian Díaz (Note: Pedro Sosa was the caretaker manager for the Torneo Apertura 14th round match against Olimpia.)	16 April 2025
2 de Mayo	(Paraguay) Felipe Giménez	Resigned	11 April 2025	12th	(Uruguay) Marcelo Palau	11 April 2025
Sportivo Ameliano	(Paraguay) Aldo Bobadilla	Sacked	16 April 2025	9th	(Paraguay) Humberto García	17 April 2025
Olimpia	(Paraguay) Aureliano Torres	End of caretaker spell	16 April 2025	3rd	(Argentina) Fabián Bustos	17 April 2025
Sportivo Luqueño	(Paraguay) Gustavo Morínigo	Sacked	18 May 2025	10th	(Paraguay) Julio César Cáceres	18 May 2025
Guaraní	(Paraguay) Francisco Arce	Sacked	2 June 2025	3rd	(Argentina) Víctor Bernay	4 June 2025
Torneo Clausura
Olimpia	(Argentina) Fabián Bustos	Sacked	14 July 2025	8th	(Argentina) Ramón Díaz	17 July 2025
General Caballero (JLM)	(Uruguay) Sebastián Vázquez	Sacked	19 July 2025	12th	(Paraguay) Humberto Ovelar	21 July 2025
Tembetary	(Argentina) Christian Díaz	Sacked	27 July 2025	11th	(Paraguay) Luis Fernando Escobar	30 July 2025
2 de Mayo	(Uruguay) Marcelo Palau	Sacked	24 August 2025	8th	(Paraguay) Felipe Giménez	25 August 2025
Olimpia	(Argentina) Ramón Díaz	Resigned	24 August 2025	9th	(Paraguay) Ever Almeida	27 August 2025
Libertad	(Paraguay) Sergio Aquino	Resigned	28 August 2025	6th	(Argentina) Pablo Guiñazú	29 August 2025
Cerro Porteño	(Argentina) Diego Martínez	Sacked	18 September 2025	3rd	(Paraguay) Jorge Achucarro	18 September 2025
Cerro Porteño	(Paraguay) Jorge Achucarro	End of caretaker spell	27 September 2025	2nd	(Uruguay) Jorge Bava	29 September 2025
Sportivo Ameliano	(Paraguay) Humberto García	Resigned	28 September 2025	11th	(Argentina) Roberto Nanni	30 September 2025
Sportivo Luqueño	(Paraguay) Julio César Cáceres	Sacked	4 October 2025	10th	(Paraguay) Lucas Barrios	6 October 2025

== Torneo Apertura ==
The Torneo Apertura, named "Osvaldo Domínguez Dibb", was the 131st official championship of the Primera División and the first championship of the 2025 season. It began on 24 January and ended on 2 June 2025.

=== Standings ===
Pos	Team	Pld	W	D	L	GF	GA	GD	Pts	Qualification
1	Libertad (C)	22	12	8	2	35	15	+20	44	Qualification for Copa Libertadores group stage
2	Cerro Porteño	22	11	6	5	33	18	+15	39	
3	Guaraní	22	12	2	8	27	24	+3	38	
4	Sportivo Trinidense	22	8	10	4	27	22	+5	34	
5	Olimpia	22	8	9	5	27	22	+5	33	
6	Sportivo Ameliano	22	7	8	7	23	20	+3	29	
7	Recoleta	22	6	9	7	29	31	−2	27	
8	Nacional	22	7	4	11	23	28	−5	25	
9	General Caballero (JLM)	22	5	7	10	19	26	−7	22 (Note: Head-to-head points: General Caballero (JLM) 4, Sportivo Luqueño 1.)	
10	Sportivo Luqueño	22	4	10	8	13	25	−12	22	
11	2 de Mayo	22	2	12	8	15	26	−11	18	
12	Tembetary	22	3	9	10	17	31	−14	18	

Source: APF, Soccerway
Rules for classification: 1) Points, 2) Head-to-head points, 3) Head-to-head goal difference, 4) Overall goal difference, 5) Goals for, 6) Playoff game (if needed to decide championship between two teams) or Drawing of lots (if three teams or more are tied).
(C) Champions

=== Results ===
Home \ Away	2DM	CCP	GCM	GUA	LIB	NAC	OLI	REC	SPA	SLU	TRI	TEM
2 de Mayo	—	1–1	0–1	0–2	0–1	0–0	0–0	0–4	1–4	1–1	1–1	1–1
Cerro Porteño	1–1	—	2–1	0–1	2–2	3–1	1–2	2–1	2–0	0–0	1–0	1–0
General Caballero (JLM)	1–1	0–1	—	0–0	0–5	2–4	1–1	2–2	1–0	3–0	1–1	0–1
Guaraní	0–1	0–2	2–1	—	0–1	2–1	2–1	1–3	1–3	2–1	1–3	0–0
Libertad	1–1	1–0	1–0	1–3	—	1–0	2–1	5–2	2–0	3–0	1–1	0–0
Nacional	1–0	1–3	1–0	1–2	0–3	—	1–1	1–1	0–1	4–0	1–1	1–0
Olimpia	2–1	2–1	0–3	0–1	1–1	0–1	—	0–0	0–0	3–1	4–2	3–0
Recoleta	0–2	1–3	3–1	0–3	1–1	1–0	1–1	—	1–1	0–1	1–2	1–1
Sportivo Ameliano	1–1	0–0	0–1	2–0	0–0	2–1	2–2	1–2	—	2–2	0–1	2–0
Sportivo Luqueño	0–0	1–1	0–0	0–1	1–0	2–1	0–1	0–0	0–0	—	1–0	1–1
Sportivo Trinidense	2–1	1–0	0–0	2–1	1–1	2–0	1–1	1–1	1–2	1–0	—	1–1
Tembetary	1–1	1–6	1–0	1–2	1–2	1–2	0–1	2–3	1–0	1–1	2–2	—

Source: APF, Soccerway
Legend: Blue = home team win; Yellow = draw; Red = away team win.

=== Top scorers ===
Rank	Player	Club	Goals
1	(Paraguay) Gustavo Caballero	Nacional	9
1	(Paraguay) Juan Iturbe	Cerro Porteño	9
3	(Paraguay) Fernando Fernández	Guaraní	8
4	(Paraguay) Lorenzo Melgarejo	Libertad	7
5	(Paraguay) Teodoro Arce	General Caballero (JLM)	6
5	(Paraguay) Néstor Camacho	Sportivo Trinidense	6
5	(Paraguay) Rodney Redes	Olimpia	6
5	(Paraguay) Juan Romero	Sportivo Trinidense	6
5	(Uruguay) Alejandro Silva	Recoleta	6
5	(Argentina) Jonathan Torres	Cerro Porteño	6

Source: Soccerway

== Torneo Clausura ==
The Torneo Clausura, named "Homenaje a los 90 años del Club Sportivo Trinidense", was the 132nd official championship of the Primera División and the second and last championship of the 2025 season. It began on 4 July and ended on 30 November 2025.

=== Standings ===
Pos	Team	Pld	W	D	L	GF	GA	GD	Pts	Qualification
1	Cerro Porteño (C)	22	13	7	2	33	18	+15	46	Qualification for Copa Libertadores group stage
2	Guaraní	22	14	3	5	44	20	+24	45	
3	Nacional	22	9	8	5	26	17	+9	35	
4	Sportivo Trinidense	22	8	9	5	25	21	+4	33 (Note: Head-to-head points: Sportivo Trinidense 6, 2 de Mayo 0.)	
5	2 de Mayo	22	9	6	7	28	27	+1	33	
6	Recoleta	22	9	5	8	35	30	+5	32	
7	Libertad	22	6	8	8	26	24	+2	26	
8	Olimpia	22	6	8	8	33	38	−5	26	
9	Sportivo Luqueño	22	7	4	11	27	36	−9	25	
10	General Caballero (JLM)	22	6	6	10	22	33	−11	24	
11	Sportivo Ameliano	22	5	4	13	22	40	−18	19	
12	Tembetary	22	3	6	13	20	37	−17	15	

Source: APF, Soccerway
Rules for classification: 1) Points, 2) Head-to-head points, 3) Head-to-head goal difference, 4) Overall goal difference, 5) Goals for, 6) Playoff game (if needed to decide championship between two teams) or Drawing of lots (if three teams or more are tied).
(C) Champions

=== Results ===
Home \ Away	2DM	CCP	GCM	GUA	LIB	NAC	OLI	REC	SPA	SLU	TRI	TEM
2 de Mayo	—	0–0	2–0	1–0	0–0	1–0	3–2	0–2	1–1	3–2	0–2	0–1
Cerro Porteño	3–2	—	3–1	1–0	1–0	0–0	1–1	2–0	2–0	0–0	1–3	1–1
General Caballero (JLM)	0–1	2–1	—	0–2	0–0	1–1	2–0	1–3	3–2	5–2	0–0	1–1
Guaraní	3–1	3–4	4–0	—	1–2	2–0	4–0	2–1	4–1	2–1	0–0	1–0
Libertad	0–1	1–1	2–0	0–4	—	0–1	2–2	1–1	1–2	0–1	0–0	3–1
Nacional	1–1	1–2	3–0	1–0	3–1	—	4–1	1–0	2–0	1–1	0–0	1–1
Olimpia	3–3	2–3	1–1	1–3	0–0	1–1	—	1–0	2–1	2–0	1–1	3–1
Recoleta	2–0	1–3	0–0	2–3	2–2	0–0	1–0	—	3–1	2–3	2–4	3–1
Sportivo Ameliano	2–3	0–1	1–4	1–1	0–4	3–0	1–1	1–4	—	0–1	0–0	1–0
Sportivo Luqueño	0–3	0–1	2–0	2–3	1–4	2–1	2–4	0–0	0–1	—	1–0	5–1
Sportivo Trinidense	2–1	0–0	2–0	1–1	0–2	0–2	4–3	2–3	1–0	2–0	—	1–1
Tembetary	1–1	0–2	0–1	0–1	2–1	0–2	0–2	2–3	2–3	1–1	3–0	—

Source: APF, Soccerway
Legend: Blue = home team win; Yellow = draw; Red = away team win.

=== Top scorers ===
Rank	Player	Club	Goals
1	(Paraguay) Matías Cáceres	2 de Mayo	7
1	(Paraguay) Juan Iturbe	Cerro Porteño	7
1	(Paraguay) Elvio Vera	Sportivo Ameliano	7
1	(Paraguay) Marcelo Pérez	Sportivo Luqueño	7
1	(Argentina) Paul Charpentier	Tembetary	7
1	(Paraguay) Hugo Quintana	Olimpia	7
7	(Paraguay) Iván Ramírez	Guaraní	6
7	(Paraguay) Néstor Camacho	Sportivo Trinidense	6
7	(Paraguay) Lucas González	Recoleta	6
7	(Paraguay) Hugo Fernández	Libertad	6
7	(Paraguay) Adrián Alcaraz	Olimpia	6

Source: Besoccer

== Aggregate table ==
Pos	Team	Pld	W	D	L	GF	GA	GD	Pts	Qualification
1	Cerro Porteño (C)	44	24	13	7	66	36	+30	85	Qualification for Copa Libertadores group stage
2	Guaraní	44	26	5	13	71	44	+27	83	Qualification for Copa Libertadores second stage
3	Libertad (C)	44	18	16	10	61	39	+22	70	Qualification for Copa Libertadores group stage
4	Sportivo Trinidense	44	16	19	9	52	43	+9	67	Qualification for Copa Sudamericana first stage
5	Nacional	44	16	12	16	49	45	+4	60	Qualification for Copa Sudamericana first stage
6	Recoleta	44	15	14	15	64	61	+3	59	Qualification for Copa Sudamericana first stage
7	Olimpia	44	14	17	13	60	60	0	59	Qualification for Copa Sudamericana first stage
8	2 de Mayo	44	11	18	15	43	53	−10	51	Qualification for Copa Libertadores first stage (Note: 2 de Mayo qualified for the Copa Libertadores first stage as 2025 Copa Paraguay runners-up since the Copa Paraguay champions General Caballero (JLM) were relegated and therefore became ineligible to qualify for South American competition.)
9	Sportivo Ameliano	44	12	12	20	45	60	−15	48	
10	Sportivo Luqueño	44	11	14	19	40	61	−21	47	
11	General Caballero (JLM)	44	11	13	20	41	59	−18	46	
12	Tembetary	44	6	15	23	37	68	−31	33	

Source: APF
Rules for classification: 1) Points, 2) Head-to-head points, 3) Head-to-head goal difference, 4) Overall goal difference, 5) Goals for, 6) Playoff game (if needed to decide international qualification between two teams) or Drawing of lots (if three teams or more are tied).
(C) Champions

== Relegation ==
Relegation is determined at the end of the season by computing an average of the number of points earned per game over the past three seasons. The two teams with the lowest average were relegated to the División Intermedia for the following season.

Pos	Team	2023 Pts	2024 Pts	2025 Pts	Total Pts	Total Pld	Avg	Relegation
1	Libertad	99	74	70	243	132	1.841	
2	Cerro Porteño	81	74	85	240	132	1.818	
3	Guaraní	65	66	83	214	132	1.621	
4	Olimpia	62	80	59	201	132	1.523	
5	Nacional	65	55	60	180	132	1.364	
6	Sportivo Trinidense	65	46	67	178	132	1.348	
7	Recoleta	—	—	59	59	44	1.341	
8	2 de Mayo	—	65	51	116	88	1.318	
9	Sportivo Ameliano	57	56	48	161	132	1.22	
10	Sportivo Luqueño	51	61	47	159	132	1.205	
11	General Caballero (JLM) (R)	49	47	46	142	132	1.076	Relegation to División Intermedia
12	Tembetary (R)	—	—	33	33	44	0.75	Relegation to División Intermedia

Source: APF

== Season awards ==
On 3 December 2025, a ceremony was held at the CARDIF Social Pavilion in Luque to announce the winners of the season awards (Premios de Primera), who were chosen based on voting by the managers of the División de Honor teams, local sports journalists, the APF's Referee Commission, the public, as well as the tournament's official broadcaster Tigo Sports and official statistics.

Award	Winner	Club
Fair Play Team	Cerro Porteño	
Most Minutes played by U-20s/U-18s	Cerro Porteño	
Best Club of the 2025 Youth Divisions	Cerro Porteño	
Club with the greatest growth and development in Youth Divisions	Guaraní	
Season's Top Scorer	(Paraguay) Juan Iturbe (16 goals)	Cerro Porteño
Best Goalkeeper	(Argentina) Alexis Martín Arias	Cerro Porteño
Revelation Player	(Paraguay) Alexandro Maidana	Guaraní
People's Player	(Paraguay) Blas Riveros	Cerro Porteño
Best Goal	(Paraguay) Matías Cáceres	2 de Mayo
Best Player	(Paraguay) Blas Riveros	Cerro Porteño
Best Manager	(Paraguay) Felipe Giménez	2 de Mayo
Best Referee	Juan Gabriel Benítez	
Best Assistant Referee	Eduardo Cardozo	
Best VAR Referee	Carlos Figueredo	

== See also ==
- 2025 Paraguayan División Intermedia
- 2025 Copa Paraguay
- 2025 Supercopa Paraguay
