= 2025 Cerro Porteño season =

Paraguan football club season

Cerro Porteño
2025 season
- Manager: Diego Martínez
- Stadium: Estadio General Pablo Rojas
- Torneo Apertura: 2nd
- Torneo Clausura: 1st
- Copa Paraguay: Third round
- Copa Libertadores: Round of 16
- Biggest win: Atlético Tembetary 1–6 Cerro Porteño
- Biggest defeat: Bolívar 4–0 Cerro Porteño

The 2025 season is the 114th season since the founding of Cerro Porteño and the club’s 113th consecutive year in the Paraguayan top flight. In this season, Cerro Porteño is competing in the Primera División, the Copa Paraguay, and the Copa Libertadores. The competitions began on 26 January.

On December 11, 2024, Cerro Porteño unveiled Diego Martínez as the head coach for the 2025 season.

== Squad ==
=== Transfers In ===
Pos.	Player	Transferred from	Fee	Date	Source
DF	(Argentina) Guillermo Benítez	(Paraguay) Guaraní	Free	1 January 2025	
GK	(Paraguay) Gatito Fernández	(Brazil) Botafogo	Free	1 January 2025	
MF	(Paraguay) Gastón Giménez	(United States) Chicago Fire	Free	1 January 2025	
DF	(Paraguay) Gustavo Velázquez	(Argentina) Newell's Old Boys	Undisclosed	4 January 2025	
FW	(Argentina) Jonatan Torres	(Argentina) Sarmiento	Undisclosed	14 January 2025	
DF	(Argentina) Matías Pérez	(Russia) FC Orenburg	€1,700,000	15 January 2025	
DF	(Paraguay) Blas Riveros	(Argentina) CA Talleres	Free	1 July 2025	
FW	(Argentina) Ignacio Aliseda	(Switzerland) FC Lugano	Free	3 July 2025	
FW	(Paraguay) Freddy Noguera	(Brazil) Grêmio U20	Free	23 July 2025	

=== Transfers Out ===
Pos.	Player	Transferred to	Fee	Date	Source
FW	(Paraguay) Ariel Ávalos	(Bolivia) San Antonio Bulo Bulo	Loan	1 July 2025	
DF	(Paraguay) Alan Benítez	(Brazil) Internacional	Free	1 July 2025	
DF	(Paraguay) Carlos Favero	(Paraguay) Atlético Tembetary	Loan	1 July 2025	
DF	(Paraguay) Alan Núñez	(Portugal) CD Nacional	Loan	1 July 2025	
DF	(Paraguay) Diego León	(England) Manchester United	£3,300,000	5 July 2025	
FW	(Brazil) Francisco Da Costa	(Brazil) Mirassol	Loan	14 July 2025	
DF	(Paraguay) Daniel Rivas	(Portugal) AVS	Free	25 July 2025	

== Competitions ==
=== Overall record ===
Competition	First match	Last match	Starting round	Final position	Record							
Competition	First match	Last match	Starting round	Final position	Pld	W	D	L	GF	GA	GD	Win %
Torneo Apertura	26 January 2025	31 May 2025	Matchday 1	2nd	22	11	6	5	33	18	+15	50.00
Torneo Clausura		5 July 2025	28 November 2025	Matchday 1	8	6	2	0	17	9	+8	75.00
Copa Paraguay	27 August 2025		Third round		0	0	0	0	0	0	+0	—
Copa Libertadores	20 February 2025	20 August 2025	Second stage	Round of 16	12	6	2	4	19	15	+4	50.00
Total					42	23	10	9	69	42	+27	54.76

Last updated: 20 August 2025
Source: Competitions

=== Primera División ===
==== Results summary ====
Overall								Home						Away					
Pld	W	D	L	GF	GA	GD	Pts	W	D	L	GF	GA	GD	W	D	L	GF	GA	GD
22	11	6	5	33	18	+15	39	6	3	2	15	9	+6	5	3	3	18	9	+9

Last updated: 31 May 2025.

==== Results by round ====
Round	1	2	3	4	5	6	7	8	9	10	11	12	13	14	15	16	17	18	19	20	21	22
Ground	H	A	H	A	H	A	H	A	H	A	H	A	H	A	H	A	H	A	H	A	H	A
Result	D	D	W	L	W	L	L	W	W	D	W	L	D	W	W	W	L	W	W	D	D	W
Position	3	5	3	5	4	5	7	5	4	4	4	4	5	4	4	3	4	3	2	2	3	2

Updated to match(es) played on 31 May 2025. Source:
A = Away; H = Home; W = Win; D = Draw; L = Loss

26 January 2025 1	Cerro Porteño	2–2	Libertad

29 January 2025 2	Sportivo Luqueño	1–1	Cerro Porteño

1 February 2025 3	Cerro Porteño	3–1	Nacional

8 February 2025 4	Sportivo Trinidense	1–0	Cerro Porteño

15 February 2025 5	Cerro Porteño	2–1	Deportivo Recoleta

23 February 2025 6	Olimpia	2–1	Cerro Porteño

2 March 2025 7	Cerro Porteño	0–1	Guaraní

9 March 2025 8	General Caballero JLM	0–1	Cerro Porteño

16 March 2025 9	Cerro Porteño	2–0	Sportivo Ameliano

23 March 2025 10	2 de Mayo	1–1	Cerro Porteño

28 March 2025 11	Cerro Porteño	1–0	Atlético Tembetary

5 April 2025 12	Libertad	1–0	Cerro Porteño

12 April 2025 13	Cerro Porteño	0–0	Sportivo Luqueño

15 April 2025 14	Nacional	1–3	Cerro Porteño

20 April 2025 15	Cerro Porteño	1–0	Sportivo Trinidense

28 April 2025 16	Deportivo Recoleta	1–3	Cerro Porteño

3 May 2025 17	Cerro Porteño	1–2	Olimpia

10 May 2025 18	Guaraní	0–2	Cerro Porteño

16 May 2025 19	Cerro Porteño	2–1	General Caballero JLM

21 May 2025 20	Sportivo Ameliano	0–0	Cerro Porteño

24 May 2025 21	Cerro Porteño	1–1	2 de Mayo

31 May 2025 22	Atlético Tembetary	1–6	Cerro Porteño

==== Results summary ====
Overall								Home						Away					
Pld	W	D	L	GF	GA	GD	Pts	W	D	L	GF	GA	GD	W	D	L	GF	GA	GD
0	0	0	0	0	0	0	0	0	0	0	0	0	0	0	0	0	0	0	0

Last updated: 16 August 2025.

==== Results by round ====
Round	1	2	3	4	5	6	7	8
Ground	H	A	H	A	H	A	H	A
Result	W	W	D	W	W	W	D	W
Position	2	2	2	1	1	1	1	1

Updated to match(es) played on 16 August 2025. Source:
A = Away; H = Home; W = Win; D = Draw; L = Loss

5 July 2025 1	Cerro Porteño	3–1	General Caballero JLM

12 July 2025 2	Sportivo Ameliano	0–1	Cerro Porteño

20 July 2025 3	Cerro Porteño	0–0	Sportivo Luqueño

26 July 2025 4	Deportivo Recoleta	1–3	Cerro Porteño

30 July 2025 5	Cerro Porteño	3–2	2 de Mayo

3 August 2025 6	Olimpia	2–3	Cerro Porteño

8 August 2025 7	Cerro Porteño	0–0	Nacional

16 August 2025 8	Guaraní	3–4	Cerro Porteño

=== Copa Paraguay ===
27 August 2025 Third round	Pastoreo	v	Cerro Porteño
18:30 UTC−3

=== Copa Libertadores ===
==== Second stage ====
20 February 2025 First leg	Monagas (Venezuela)	0–4	(Paraguay) Cerro Porteño	Maturin, Venezuela
18:00 UTC−4			Chico 14'; Benítez 33'; Domínguez 45+3'; Viera 63'	Stadium: Estadio Monumental de Maturín; Attendance: 14,930; Referee: Dario Herrera (Argentina)

27 February 2025 Second leg	Cerro Porteño (Paraguay)	3–1 (7–1 agg.)	(Venezuela) Monagas	Asunción
19:00 UTC−3				Stadium: Estadio General Pablo Rojas; Attendance: 11,126; Referee: Flavio Rodrigues de Souza (Brazil)

==== Third stage ====
5 March 2025 First leg	Melgar (Peru)	0–1	(Paraguay) Cerro Porteño	Arequipa, Peru
17:00 UTC−5			Piris Da Motta 34' (pen.)	Stadium: Estadio Monumental Virgen de Chapi; Attendance: 19,589; Referee: Piero Maza (Chile)

12 March 2025 Second leg	Cerro Porteño (Paraguay)	4–2 (5–2 agg.)	(Peru) Melgar	Asunción
19:00 UTC−3				Stadium: Estadio General Pablo Rojas; Attendance: 13,049; Referee: Raphael Claus (Brazil)

==== Group stage ====
Group G

Pos	Team	Pld	W	D	L	GF	GA	GD	Pts	Qualification
1	(Brazil) Palmeiras	6	6	0	0	17	4	+13	18	Advance to round of 16
2	(Paraguay) Cerro Porteño	6	2	1	3	7	11	−4	7	Advance to round of 16
3	(Bolivia) Bolívar	6	2	0	4	12	11	+1	6	Transfer to Copa Sudamericana
4	(Peru) Sporting Cristal	6	1	1	4	6	16	−10	4	

Source: CONMEBOL
Rules for classification: 1) Points; 2) Goal difference; 3) Goals scored; 4) Away goals scored; 5) CONMEBOL ranking.

1 April 2025 1	Cerro Porteño (Paraguay)	4–2	(Bolivia) Bolívar	Asunción
	Torres 45+3', 47', 61'; Morel 72'		Vaca 17', 89'	Stadium: Estadio General Pablo Rojas; Attendance: 15,997; Referee: Alexis Herrera (Venezuela)

9 April 2025 2	Palmeiras (Brazil)	1–0	(Paraguay) Cerro Porteño	São Paulo, Brazil
	Ríos 41'			Stadium: Allianz Parque; Attendance: 24,530; Referee: Andrés Rojas (Colombia)

24 April 2025 3	Cerro Porteño (Paraguay)	2–2	(Peru) Sporting Cristal	Asunción
	Domínguez 42'; Carrizo 44'		González 37'; Lutiger 90+2'	Stadium: Estadio General Pablo Rojas; Attendance: 18,016; Referee: Esteban Ostojich (Uruguay)

7 May 2025 4	Cerro Porteño (Paraguay)	0–2	(Brazil) Palmeiras	Asunción
			Estêvão 41'; Vitor Roque 90+4'	Stadium: Estadio General Pablo Rojas; Attendance: 16,590; Referee: Piero Maza (Chile)

13 May 2025 5	Sporting Cristal (Peru)	0–1	(Paraguay) Cerro Porteño	Lima, Peru
			Iturbe 14'	Stadium: National Stadium; Attendance: 31,514; Referee: Facundo Tello (Argentina)

28 May 2025 6	Bolívar (Bolivia)	4–0	(Paraguay) Cerro Porteño	La Paz, Bolivia
	Romero 41'; Melgar 45+2'; Rodríguez 50'; Fábio Gomes 80'			Stadium: Estadio Hernando Siles; Attendance: 8,202; Referee: Andrés Matonte (Uruguay)

==== Final stages ====
===== Round of 16 =====
13 August 2025 First leg	Cerro Porteño (Paraguay)	0–1	(Argentina) Estudiantes	Asunción
19:00 UTC−3			Ascacibar 90+8' (pen.)	Stadium: Estadio General Pablo Rojas; Attendance: 29,928; Referee: Piero Maza (Chile)

20 August 2025 Second leg	Estudiantes (Argentina)	0–0 (1–0 agg.)	(Paraguay) Cerro Porteño	La Plata, Argentina
19:00 UTC−3				Stadium: Estadio Jorge Luis Hirschi; Referee: Jesús Valenzuela (Venezuela)
