= 2025 in Paraguayan football =

Football in Paraguay
- Season: 2025

The following article presents a summary of the 2025 football season in Paraguay, which is the 115th season of competitive football in the country.

== First Division ==
The 2025 Primera División started on 24 January 2025 and ended on 30 November 2025.

- 2 de Mayo
- Cerro Porteño
- General Caballero-JLM
- Guaraní
- Libertad
- Nacional
- Olimpia
- Recoleta
- Sportivo Ameliano
- Sportivo Luqueño
- Sportivo Trinidense
- Tembetary

=== Torneo Apertura ===
Pos	Team	Pld	W	D	L	GF	GA	GD	Pts
1	Libertad (C)	22	12	8	2	35	15	+20	44
2	Cerro Porteño	22	11	6	5	33	18	+15	39
3	Guaraní	22	12	2	8	27	24	+3	38
4	Sportivo Trinidense	22	8	10	4	27	22	+5	34
5	Olimpia	22	8	9	5	27	22	+5	33
6	Sportivo Ameliano	22	7	8	7	23	20	+3	29
7	Recoleta	22	6	9	7	29	31	−2	27
8	Nacional	22	7	4	11	23	28	−5	25
9	General Caballero-JLM	22	5	7	10	19	26	−7	22 (Note: Head-to-head points: General Caballero-JLM 4, Sportivo Luqueño 1.)
10	Sportivo Luqueño	22	4	10	8	13	25	−12	22
11	2 de Mayo	22	2	12	8	15	26	−11	18
12	Tembetary	22	3	9	10	17	31	−14	18

Source: APF, Soccerway
Rules for classification: 1) Points, 2) Head-to-head points, 3) Head-to-head goal difference, 4) Overall goal difference, 5) Goals for, 6) Playoff game (if needed to decide championship between two teams) or Drawing of lots (if three teams or more are tied).
(C) Champions

=== Torneo Clausura ===
Pos	Team	Pld	W	D	L	GF	GA	GD	Pts
1	Cerro Porteño (C)	22	13	7	2	33	18	+15	46
2	Guaraní	22	14	3	5	44	20	+24	45
3	Nacional	22	9	8	5	26	17	+9	35
4	Sportivo Trinidense	22	8	9	5	25	21	+4	33 (Note: Head-to-head points: Sportivo Trinidense 6, 2 de Mayo 0.)
5	2 de Mayo	22	9	6	7	28	27	+1	33
6	Recoleta	22	9	5	8	35	30	+5	32
7	Libertad	22	6	8	8	26	24	+2	26
8	Olimpia	22	6	8	8	33	38	−5	26
9	Sportivo Luqueño	22	7	4	11	27	36	−9	25
10	General Caballero-JLM	22	6	6	10	22	33	−11	24
11	Sportivo Ameliano	22	5	4	13	22	40	−18	19
12	Tembetary	22	3	6	13	20	37	−17	15

Source: APF, Soccerway
Rules for classification: 1) Points, 2) Head-to-head points, 3) Head-to-head goal difference, 4) Overall goal difference, 5) Goals for, 6) Playoff game (if needed to decide championship between two teams) or Drawing of lots (if three teams or more are tied).
(C) Champions

=== Aggregate table ===
Pos	Team	Pld	W	D	L	GF	GA	GD	Pts	Qualification
1	Cerro Porteño (C)	44	24	13	7	66	36	+30	85	Qualification for Copa Libertadores group stage
2	Guaraní	44	26	5	13	71	44	+27	83	Qualification for Copa Libertadores second stage
3	Libertad (C)	44	18	16	10	61	39	+22	70	Qualification for Copa Libertadores group stage
4	Sportivo Trinidense	44	16	19	9	52	43	+9	67	Qualification for Copa Sudamericana first stage
5	Nacional	44	16	12	16	49	45	+4	60	Qualification for Copa Sudamericana first stage
6	Recoleta	44	15	14	15	64	61	+3	59	Qualification for Copa Sudamericana first stage
7	Olimpia	44	14	17	13	60	60	0	59	Qualification for Copa Sudamericana first stage
8	2 de Mayo	44	11	18	15	43	53	−10	51	Qualification for Copa Libertadores first stage (Note: 2 de Mayo qualified for the Copa Libertadores first stage as 2025 Copa Paraguay runners-up since the Copa Paraguay champions General Caballero-JLM were relegated and therefore became ineligible to qualify for South American competition.)
9	Sportivo Ameliano	44	12	12	20	45	60	−15	48	
10	Sportivo Luqueño	44	11	14	19	40	61	−21	47	
11	General Caballero-JLM	44	11	13	20	41	59	−18	46	
12	Tembetary	44	6	15	23	37	68	−31	33	

Source: APF
Rules for classification: 1) Points, 2) Head-to-head points, 3) Head-to-head goal difference, 4) Overall goal difference, 5) Goals for, 6) Playoff game (if needed to decide international qualification between two teams) or Drawing of lots (if three teams or more are tied).
(C) Champions

=== Relegation ===
Pos	Team	2023 Pts	2024 Pts	2025 Pts	Total Pts	Total Pld	Avg	Relegation
1	Libertad	99	74	70	243	132	1.841	
2	Cerro Porteño	81	74	85	240	132	1.818	
3	Guaraní	65	66	83	214	132	1.621	
4	Olimpia	62	80	59	201	132	1.523	
5	Nacional	65	55	60	180	132	1.364	
6	Sportivo Trinidense	65	46	67	178	132	1.348	
7	Recoleta	—	—	59	59	44	1.341	
8	2 de Mayo	—	65	51	116	88	1.318	
9	Sportivo Ameliano	57	56	48	161	132	1.22	
10	Sportivo Luqueño	51	61	47	159	132	1.205	
11	General Caballero-JLM (R)	49	47	46	142	132	1.076	Relegation to División Intermedia
12	Tembetary (R)	—	—	33	33	44	0.75	Relegation to División Intermedia

== Second Division ==
The second-tier División Intermedia started in 28 March and ended in 5 October 2025.

- 12 de Junio
- Deportivo Capiatá
- Deportivo Santaní
- Encarnación
- Fernando de la Mora
- Guaireña
- Guaraní-Fram
- Independiente-CG
- Pastoreo
- Resistencia
- River Plate
- Rubio Ñu
- San Lorenzo
- Sol de América
- Sportivo Carapeguá
- Tacuary

=== Standings ===
Pos	Team	Pld	W	D	L	GF	GA	GD	Pts	Qualification
1	Rubio Ñu (C, P)	30	17	9	4	46	21	+25	60	Promotion to Primera División
2	San Lorenzo (P)	30	15	8	7	38	22	+16	53	Promotion to Primera División
3	Deportivo Capiatá	30	14	10	6	37	21	+16	52	
4	12 de Junio	30	12	12	6	36	26	+10	48	
5	Pastoreo	30	10	11	9	34	31	+3	41	
6	Resistencia	30	9	13	8	46	50	−4	40	
7	Guaireña	30	11	6	13	41	38	+3	39	
8	Sol de América	30	9	11	10	34	35	−1	38 (Note: Head-to-head points: Sol de América 4, Tacuary 1.)	
9	Tacuary	30	10	8	12	28	36	−8	38	
10	River Plate	30	8	13	9	35	39	−4	37	
11	Encarnación	30	8	11	11	33	42	−9	35 (Note: Head-to-head points: Encarnación 4, Deportivo Santaní 1.)	
12	Deportivo Santaní	30	8	11	11	33	35	−2	35	
13	Sportivo Carapeguá	30	7	13	10	39	46	−7	34	
14	Independiente-CG	30	9	7	14	32	40	−8	34	
15	Fernando de la Mora	30	6	10	14	24	40	−16	28	
16	Guaraní-Fram	30	5	11	14	35	49	−14	26	

Source: APF, Soccerway
Rules for classification: 1) Points, 2) Head-to-head points, 3) Head-to-head goal difference, 4) Overall goal difference, 5) Goals for, 6) Playoff game (if needed to decide championship between two teams) or Drawing of lots (if three teams or more are tied).
(C) Champions; (P) Promoted

=== Relegation ===
Pos	Team	2023 Pts	2024 Pts	2025 Pts	Total Pts	Total Pld	Avg	Relegation
1	Deportivo Capiatá	—	—	54	54	30	1.8	
2	Rubio Ñu	44	42	60	146	90	1.622	
3	San Lorenzo	42	46	53	141	90	1.567	
4	Sportivo Carapeguá	43	58	33	134	90	1.489	
5	12 de Junio	—	38	48	86	60	1.433	
6	Resistencia	—	45	40	85	60	1.417	
7	Independiente-CG	51	38	34	123	90	1.367	
8	Deportivo Santaní	44	42	35	121	90	1.344	
9	Encarnación	—	44	35	79	60	1.317	
10	Guaireña	—	38	39	77	60	1.283	
11	Sol de América	—	—	38	38	30	1.267	
12	Tacuary	—	—	38	38	30	1.267	
13	Fernando de la Mora	48	35	28	111	90	1.233 (Note: Fernando de la Mora ahead of River Plate on head-to-head goal difference: Fernando de la Mora 1–2 River Plate, River Plate 0–3 Fernando de la Mora.)	
14	River Plate (R)	—	—	37	37	30	1.233	Relegation to Primera B Metropolitana
15	Pastoreo (R)	43	23	41	107	90	1.189	Relegation to Primera B Nacional
16	Guaraní-Fram (R)	—	—	26	26	30	0.867	Relegation to Primera B Nacional

Source: APF
