= Felipe Giménez =

Paraguayan football manager (born 1981)

Personal information
- Full name: Felipe Ariel Giménez Miranda
- Date of birth: 26 May 1981 (age 45)
- Place of birth: Asunción, Paraguay
- Height: 1.73 m (5 ft 8 in)
- Position: Left-back

Youth career
- 1998–2000: Olimpia

Senior career*
Years	Team	Apps	(Gls)
2001–2004	Olimpia	19	(0)
2001	→ 12 de Octubre (loan)		
2004	Cerro Porteño	2	(0)
2005	Newell's Old Boys	0	(0)
2006–2007	Guaraní	12	(1)
2008	3 de Febrero	5	(1)
2008–2009	12 de Octubre		
2010	Sportivo Trinidense	16	(1)
2010	3 de Febrero	16	(0)
2011–2012	Sportivo Patria	15	(0)
2012	Independiente FBC	6	(0)
2013–2014	Fernando de la Mora		
2015	Deportivo Capiatá	4	(0)

International career
2001	Paraguay U20	5	(1)
2004	Paraguay U23		

Managerial career
- 2016: Caacupé FBC (youth)
- 2017: Resistencia (youth)
- 2018–2020: Guaraní (youth)
- 2020: General Díaz (assistant)
- 2021–2022: General Caballero JLM (assistant)
- 2021: General Caballero JLM (interim)
- 2022: Deportivo Capiatá
- 2023–2025: 2 de Mayo
- 2025: 2 de Mayo
- 2026: Nacional Asunción
- 2026: Rubio Ñu
- * Club domestic league appearances and goals

Felipe Ariel Giménez Miranda (born 26 May 1981) is a Paraguayan football manager and former player who played as a left-back.

== Playing career ==
Born in Asunción, Giménez was an Olimpia youth graduate. After a loan stint to 12 de Octubre in 2001, he returned to his parent club before joining Cerro Porteño in 2004.

In 2005, Giménez moved abroad for the first time in his career and signed for Argentine Primera División side Newell's Old Boys. After just one friendly match, he returned to his home country in the following year with Guaraní, but suffered a knee injury in October 2006.

Giménez subsequently featured for 3 de Febrero (two stints), 12 de Octubre, Sportivo Trinidense, Sportivo Patria, Independiente FBC, Fernando de la Mora and Deportivo Capiatá. He retired with the latter in 2015, aged 34.

== Managerial career ==
After retiring, Giménez worked as a youth coach at Caacupé FBC, Resistencia and Guaraní, and an assistant at General Díaz and General Caballero JLM, being an interim of the latter for one match in October 2021 after Humberto Ovelar left. On 19 April 2022, he left General Caballero.

Shortly after leaving General Caballero, Giménez returned to his last club Capiatá, now as manager in the Primera División B Nacional, but was dismissed by the club on 6 August 2022, He later took over División Intermedia side 2 de Mayo in December, and led the club to a promotion to the Primera División after a 15-year absence.

On 11 April 2025, Giménez resigned from 2 de Mayo, but returned to the club on 25 August. After reaching the 2025 Copa Paraguay final and qualifying to the 2026 Copa Libertadores, he resigned again on 27 November.

On 15 December 2025, Giménez was named Nacional Asunción manager for the upcoming season. He was sacked the following 7 April, after a 3–0 loss to Olimpia, and took over fellow top tier side Rubio Ñu seven days later.

Giménez was dismissed from Rubio Ñu on 8 August 2026.

== Personal life ==
Aside from playing football, Giménez graduated in law in 2020.
