= General Caballero (disambiguation) =

General Caballero is a neighbourhood of Asunción, Paraguay.

General Caballero also may refer to:

- General Bernardino Caballero, Paraguay
- Club General Caballero (Juan León Mallorquín), a football club from Doctor Juan León Mallorquín, Paraguay
- General Caballero Sport Club, a football club from Zeballos Cué, Paraguay
