= Ayrton Sánchez =

Argentine footballer (born 2000)

Personal information
- Full name: Ayrton Ariel Sánchez
- Date of birth: 6 March 2000 (age 26)
- Place of birth: Córdoba, Argentina
- Height: 1.73 m (5 ft 8 in)
- Position: Left-back

Team information
- Current team: Tristán Suárez

Youth career
- Boca Juniors

Senior career*
| Years | Team | Apps | (Gls) |
| 2021–2022 | Boca Juniors | 0 | (0) |
| 2021 | → Central Español (loan) | 4 | (0) |
| 2022–2026 | Brown de Adrogué | 53 | (1) |
| 2024 | → Quilmes (loan) | 21 | (0) |
| 2025 | → General Caballero JLM (loan) | 10 | (1) |
| 2026– | Tristán Suárez | 7 | (0) |
- * Club domestic league appearances and goals as of 17:13, 6 May 2026 (UTC)

Ayrton Ariel Sánchez (born 6 March 2000) is an Argentine footballer currently playing as a left-back for Tristán Suárez.

== Career statistics ==
=== Club ===
As of 18 August 2021.

| Club | Season | League | | | Cup | | Continental | | Other | | Total | |
| Club | Season | Division | Apps | Goals | Apps | Goals | Apps | Goals | Apps | Goals | Apps | Goals |
|---|---|---|---|---|---|---|---|---|---|---|---|---|
| Boca Juniors | 2021 | Argentine Primera División | 0 | 0 | 0 | 0 | – | | 0 | 0 | 0 | 0 |
| Central Español (loan) | 2021 | Uruguayan Segunda División | 4 | 0 | 0 | 0 | – | | 0 | 0 | 4 | 0 |
| Career total | | | 4 | 0 | 0 | 0 | 0 | 0 | 0 | 0 | 4 | 0 |
