= Vista Alegre (Asunción) =

- Barrio
- Location within Paraguay
- Coordinates: 25.3156904°S 57.6045317°W
- Country: Paraguay
- Autonomous Capital District: Gran Asunción
- City: Asunción

Area
  - Total: 2.40 km^{2} (0.93 sq mi)
- Elevation: 43 m (141 ft)

Population
  - Total: 12,611

Vista Alegre is a neighbourhood (barrio) of Asunción, Paraguay.

== Boundaries ==
Vista Alegre is bounded by the city border to the south, Nazareth to the east by Medicos del Chaco avenue, Pinozá to the west by Bruno Guggiari avenue, and to north is Mburicaó by Dr. Eusebio Ayala avenue.
