= Gabriel Aguayo =

Paraguayan footballer

Personal information
- Full name: Gabriel Aguayo Diaz
- Date of birth: 10 February 2005 (age 21)
- Place of birth: San Estanislao, Paraguay
- Height: 1.70 m (5 ft 7 in)
- Position: Midfielder

Team information
- Current team: Cerro Porteño
- Number: 17

Youth career
- –2024: Cerro Porteño

Senior career*
Years	Team	Apps	(Gls)
2024–	Cerro Porteño	44	(2)
- * Club domestic league appearances and goals as of 12 August 2025

Gabriel Aguayo Diaz (born 10 February 2005) is a Paraguayan footballer who plays for Paraguayan Primera División club Cerro Porteño.

== Club career ==
Born in San Estanislao, Aguayo began playing football at age five. By 2019, he was part of the under-14 team at Cerro Porteño. He broke into the club's senior setup at age nineteen in 2024, debuting on 15 March in a league match against Sportivo Luqueño. His first league goal came against Sportivo Trinidense. By the end of the season, he had also made four appearances in the 2024 Copa Libertadores and another in the 2024 Copa Sudamericana.

Aguayo was reportedly drawing interest from at least five of Brazil's top clubs by May 2024. In July 2024, the Daily Express reported that he was being monitored by Premier League club Wolverhampton Wanderers and D.C. United and Nashville SC of Major League Soccer. However, in late August 2024, Cerro Porteño announced that the player had signed a five-year contract extension and would be remaining with the club for a while longer, despite the rumors.

== International career ==
By 2021, Aguayo was a member of the Paraguay national under-17 team. Carlos Jara Saguier, head coach of the national under-23 team, wanted to include Aguayo in Paraguay's squad for the 2024 Summer Olympics but the player became eligible after the deadline for roster submissions.

At age nineteen, in his first season of senior club football, Aguayo was called up to the senior national team for the first time for friendlies against Peru, Chile, and Panama in June 2024 as part of the team's preparation for 2024 Copa América.
