= Yuki Tamura =

Japanese footballer

Yuki Tamura 田村 祐基
Personal information
- Full name: Yuki Tamura
- Date of birth: December 31, 1985 (age 40)
- Place of birth: Hiroshima, Hiroshima, Japan
- Height: 1.80 m (5 ft 11 in)
- Position: Forward

Youth career
- 1998–2003: Sanfrecce Hiroshima

Senior career*
| Years | Team | Apps | (Gls) |
| 2004–2007 | Sanfrecce Hiroshima | 8 | (1) |
| 2006 | → Ehime FC (loan) | 36 | (3) |
| 2008 | FC Gifu | 1 | (0) |
| 2008–2009 | Gainare Tottori | 17 | (2) |
| 2010 | Guaraní | | |
| 2010 | Sportivo Trinidense | | |
| 2011 | Sportivo Luqueño | | |
| 2011 | Sportivo Trinidense | | |
| Total | | 62+ | (6+) |
Medal record
Sanfrecce Hiroshima
| Runner-up | Emperor's Cup | 2007 |
- * Club domestic league appearances and goals

Yuki Tamura (田村 祐基, Tamura Yūki; born December 31, 1985) is a former Japanese football player.

== Club statistics ==
| Club performance | | | League | | Cup | | League Cup | | Total | |
| Season | Club | League | Apps | Goals | Apps | Goals | Apps | Goals | Apps | Goals |
| Japan | | | League | | Emperor's Cup | | J.League Cup | | Total | |
|---|---|---|---|---|---|---|---|---|---|---|
| 2004 | Sanfrecce Hiroshima | J1 League | 8 | 1 | 0 | 0 | 1 | 0 | 9 | 1 |
| 2005 | Sanfrecce Hiroshima | J1 League | 0 | 0 | 0 | 0 | 0 | 0 | 0 | 0 |
| 2006 | Ehime FC | J2 League | 36 | 3 | 0 | 0 | - | | 36 | 3 |
| 2007 | Sanfrecce Hiroshima | J1 League | 0 | 0 | 0 | 0 | 2 | 0 | 2 | 0 |
| 2008 | FC Gifu | J2 League | 1 | 0 | 0 | 0 | - | | 1 | 0 |
| 2008 | Gainare Tottori | JFL | 7 | 2 | 1 | 0 | - | | 8 | 2 |
| 2009 | Gainare Tottori | JFL | 10 | 0 | 0 | 0 | - | | 10 | 0 |
| Career total | | | 62 | 6 | 1 | 0 | 3 | 0 | 66 | 6 |
