= Agustín Da Silveira =

Uruguayan footballer (born 2000)

Personal information
- Full name: Agustín Da Silveira Muñoa
- Date of birth: 11 December 2000 (age 25)
- Place of birth: Artigas, Uruguay
- Height: 1.79 m (5 ft 10 in)
- Position: Centre-back

Team information
- Current team: Sportivo Trinidense
- Number: 40

Youth career
- 2016–2021: Peñarol

Senior career*
| Years | Team | Apps | (Gls) |
| 2021–2023 | Peñarol | 20 | (0) |
| 2023 | → Fénix (loan) | 21 | (1) |
| 2024 | Estudiantes de Río Cuarto | 6 | (1) |
| 2024 | Fénix | 8 | (0) |
| 2025– | Sportivo Trinidense | 13 | (0) |
- * Club domestic league appearances and goals as of 13 August 2025

Agustín Da Silveira Muñoa (born 11 December 2000) is a Uruguayan professional footballer who plays as a centre-back for Sportivo Trinidense.

== Career ==
Da Silveira joined the Peñarol youth academy in 2016, beginning with the club's under-16 squad. He made his professional debut on 6 August 2021 in a 1–0 league win over Cerro Largo.

== Career statistics ==
As of 2 November 2022

Appearances and goals by club, season and competition
| Club | Season | League | | | Cup | | Continental | | Other | | Total | |
| Club | Season | Division | Apps | Goals | Apps | Goals | Apps | Goals | Apps | Goals | Apps | Goals |
|---|---|---|---|---|---|---|---|---|---|---|---|---|
| Peñarol | 2021 | Uruguayan Primera División | 3 | 0 | — | | 0 | 0 | 0 | 0 | 3 | 0 |
| Peñarol | 2022 | Uruguayan Primera División | 17 | 0 | 5 | 0 | 3 (Note: Appearances in Copa Libertadores.) | 0 | 0 | 0 | 25 | 0 |
| Career total | | | 20 | 0 | 5 | 0 | 3 | 0 | 0 | 0 | 28 | 0 |

== Honours ==
Peñarol

- Uruguayan Primera División: 2021
