= General Caballero =

Coordinates: 25°20′S 57°34′W

- Barrio
- Interactive map of General Caballero
- Country: Paraguay
- Autonomous Capital District: Gran Asunción
- City: Asunción

Area
  - Total: 0.90 km^{2} (0.35 sq mi)
- Elevation: 43 m (141 ft)

Population
  - Total: 7,350

General Caballero is a neighbourhood (barrio) of Asunción, Paraguay.

== Boundaries and bordering neighborhoods ==
Mariscal Lopez Avenue on the north marks the boundary with Mariscal López. Juscelino Kutschek Avenue on the east marks the boundary with Mburicaó. Eusebio Ayala Avenue to the south with Pinozá and General Santos Avenue on the west bounds Ciudad Nueva.
