= Wilder Viera =

Paraguayan footballer (born 2002)

Personal information
- Full name: Wilder Viera Caballero
- Date of birth: 2 March 2002 (age 24)
- Place of birth: Ypané, Paraguay
- Height: 1.82 m (6 ft 0 in)
- Position: Midfielder

Team information
- Current team: Instituto
- Number: 14

Youth career
- Cerro Porteño

Senior career*
| Years | Team | Apps | (Gls) |
| 2020–2026 | Cerro Porteño | 98 | (1) |
| 2022 | → General Caballero JLM (loan) | 13 | (2) |
| 2026– | Instituto | 0 | (0) |

International career^{‡}
- Paraguay U15
| 2019 | Paraguay U17 | 13 | (0) |
| 2019 | Paraguay U18 | 1 | (0) |
| 2023– | Paraguay U23 | 13 | (0) |
| 2024– | Paraguay | 1 | (0) |
- * Club domestic league appearances and goals as of 16:52, 19 August 2026 (UTC) ‡ National team caps and goals as of 6 September 2024

Wilder Viera Caballero (born 4 March 2002) is a Paraguayan footballer who plays as a midfielder for Instituto and the Paraguay national team.

== Club career ==
Born in Ypané in the Central department, Viera began playing football in the Cerro Porteño academy. In May 2020, the 18-year-old signed his first professional contract.

On 2 August 2020, Viera made his debut in the Paraguayan Primera División in a 4–1 home win over Club Sportivo San Lorenzo, as a 66th-minute substitute for captain Mathías Villasanti. Due to Villasanti's suspension, he made his continental debut in the Copa Libertadores on 25 May 2021 against Colombia's América de Cali.

In July 2022, Cerro Porteño manager Francisco Arce loaned Viera and two others to General Caballero JLM in the same league. He played 13 games for the team from Doctor Juan León Mallorquín, scoring his first two goals.

On 17 February 2023, starting by surprise away to Guaireña on the debut of new manager Facundo Sava, Viera scored his first goal for Cerro Porteño with a left-footed strike in a 2–0 win. In April, his sudden absence against Sportivo Ameliano caused rumours that the Argentine had dropped him, but he was in fact hospitalised after having been kicked in the genitals during the previous match against Tacuary. His contract was extended in June, to last through 2026.

Viera rejected a move to SC Internacional of the Campeonato Brasileiro Série A in 2023. In February 2024, his agent Renato Bittar said that he would likely leave for another Brazilian club in the middle of the year.

== International career ==
Viera was captain of Paraguay at under-15 and under-17 level. In the latter team, he helped them to the quarter finals of the 2019 FIFA U-17 World Cup in Brazil, giving two assists as they came from behind to beat neighbours Argentina 3–2 in the last 16; Spanish sports newspaper Marca named him one of eight stars of the round.

Viera was selected for the under-23 team for the 2024 Olympic football event in France. In Paraguay's first game, he was sent off in 25 minutes for a foul on Yu Hirakawa in a 5–0 loss to Japan.

Viera made his debut for the senior Paraguay national team on 6 September 2024 in a World Cup qualifier against Uruguay at the Estadio Centenario. He substituted Damián Bobadilla in the 82nd minute of a scoreless draw.

== Career statistics ==
=== International ===
As of match played 10 September 2024

Paraguay
| Year | Apps | Goals |
| 2024 | 1 | 0 |
| Total | 1 | 0 |
