= Humberto Ovelar =

Paraguayan football manager (born 1969)

Personal information
- Full name: Humberto Jesús Ovelar Rojas
- Date of birth: 24 December 1969 (age 56)
- Place of birth: Juan León Mallorquín, Paraguay
- Position: Midfielder

Team information
- Current team: General Caballero JLM (manager)

Senior career*
Years	Team	Apps	(Gls)
1987–1992	Cerro Porteño		
1992–1994	River Plate Asunción		
1994–1995	Tembetary		
1996–1997	Cerro Porteño		
1997–1998	Deportivo Pereira		
1998	Cerro Porteño		

Managerial career
- 1998: Cerro Porteño (assistant)
- 1999: Club América (assistant)
- 2000–2001: Sportivo Luqueño (assistant)
- 2002–2003: Sport Colombia (assistant)
- 2004: Olimpia (assistant)
- 2005: Sport Colombia
- 2005–2007: 12 de Octubre
- 2007: 3 de Febrero
- 2009: 12 de Octubre
- 2009–2011: Sport Colombia
- 2011: Rubio Ñu
- 2012–2013: Sport Colombia
- 2013: Sportivo Carapeguá
- 2014–2015: Sportivo San Lorenzo
- 2015: 12 de Octubre
- 2017–2018: Resistencia
- 2018–2019: Sportivo Iteño
- 2019: Resistencia
- 2020–2021: General Caballero JLM
- 2022: River Plate Asunción
- 2022: Tacuary
- 2022–2023: General Caballero JLM
- 2023: Independiente FBC
- 2023: Guaireña
- 2024: Sol de América
- 2024: Independiente FBC
- 2024–2025: Resistencia
- 2025–: General Caballero JLM
- * Club domestic league appearances and goals

Humberto Jesús Ovelar Rojas (born 24 December 1969) is a Paraguayan football manager and former player who played as a midfielder. He is the current manager of General Caballero JLM.

== Playing career ==
Ovelar was born in Juan León Mallorquín, and made his senior debut with Cerro Porteño in 1987, aged 18. He subsequently represented River Plate Asunción and Tembetary before returning to Cerro in 1996, but moved abroad in 1997 with Colombian side Deportivo Pereira.

In 1998, after a short period back at Cerro, Ovelar retired at the age of just 28.

== Coaching career ==
Immediately after retiring, Ovelar remained at his last club Cerro Porteño as an assistant manager. He continued to work in this role at Club América, Sportivo Luqueño, Sport Colombia and Olimpia, before being named manager of Sport Colombia in 2005.

In October 2005, Ovelar was named manager of Primera División side 12 de Octubre. Sacked in the first rounds of the 2007 season, he took over 3 de Febrero in April of that year.

Ovelar returned to 12 de Octubre in 2009, but resigned on 16 September of that year. He subsequently returned to Sport Colombia, leading the side to the second place in the 2009 División Intermedia and achieving top tier promotion.

Ovelar left in July 2011 after a poor campaign, and took over Rubio Ñu shortly after. He was sacked by the latter on 21 December, and returned to Sport Colombia in the following year.

In July 2013, Ovelar was named in charge of Sportivo Carapeguá, but resigned in September. He took over Sportivo San Lorenzo on 14 December, and won the 2014 Intermedia tournament with the side.

In March 2015, Ovelar was dismissed from San Lorenzo, and returned to 12 de Octubre in April. In 2017, he was appointed Resistencia manager, but left the club in the following year and subsequently took over Sportivo Iteño in June 2018.

In May 2019, Ovelar returned to Resistencia. In 2020, he took over hometown side General Caballero JLM, and led the club to their first-ever top tier promotion in 2021, also qualifying to the 2022 Copa Sudamericana; on 18 October 2021, however, he resigned.

On 24 December 2021, Ovelar returned to River Plate, but now as manager. He was sacked on 13 April 2022, and was named in charge of Tacuary on 2 May, but was also dismissed from the latter on 5 July.

On 17 September 2022, Ovelar returned to General Caballero, but was sacked the following 26 February, after a poor start of the campaign. On 8 August 2023, after a brief period at Independiente FBC, he replaced Luciano Theiler at the helm of Guaireña.

On 4 December 2023, after suffering relegation with Guaireña, Ovelar took over Sol de América, but resigned the following 10 February and returned to Independiente in May.

== Honours ==
General Caballero JLM

- Copa Paraguay: 2025
