= Pinozá =

Coordinates: 25.3065°S 57.6145°W

- Barrio
- Interactive map of Pinozá
- Country: Paraguay
- Autonomous Capital District: Gran Asunción
- City: Asunción

Pinozá is a neighbourhood (barrio) of Asunción, Paraguay.

== Boundaries ==
Pinozá is bounded by the city boundary to the south, Vista Alegre to the east by Bruno Guggiari Avenue, and by General Caballero to the north by Dr. Eusebio Ayala Avenue.
