= Gatito Fernández =

Paraguayan footballer (born 1988)

- Fernández with Paraguay in 2026

Personal information
- Full name: Roberto Júnior Fernández Torres
- Date of birth: 29 March 1988 (age 38)
- Place of birth: Asunción, Paraguay
- Height: 1.91 m (6 ft 3 in)
- Position: Goalkeeper

Team information
- Current team: Cerro Porteño
- Number: 25

Youth career
- 2000–2007: Cerro Porteño

Senior career*
Years	Team	Apps	(Gls)
2007–2014	Cerro Porteño	122	(0)
2009–2010	→ Estudiantes (loan)	0	(0)
2010–2011	→ Racing Club (loan)	15	(0)
2011–2012	→ Utrecht (loan)	13	(0)
2014–2015	Vitória	39	(0)
2016	Figueirense	28	(0)
2017–2024	Botafogo	114	(0)
2025–	Cerro Porteño	15	(0)

International career^{‡}
2007	Paraguay U20	4	(0)
2011–	Paraguay	31	(0)
2024	Paraguay Olympic (O.P.)	5	(0)
Medal record
Representing Paraguay
Copa América
Runner-up	2011 Argentina	Team
- * Club domestic league appearances and goals as of 24 May 2026 ‡ National team caps and goals as of 31 August 2026

Roberto Júnior Fernández Torres (born 29 March 1988), better known as Gatito Fernández, is a Paraguayan professional footballer who plays as a goalkeeper for Paraguayan Primera División club Cerro Porteño and the Paraguay national team.

He is known as Gatito (English: little cat or kitten) for being the son of former Paraguayan 1986 World Cup goalkeeper Roberto Fernández, nicknamed Gato (English: cat). Because of his father, who was a goalkeeper at Brazilian clubs, such as Internacional and Palmeiras, Gatito had lived in Brazil before his professional days.

== Club career ==
=== Early career ===
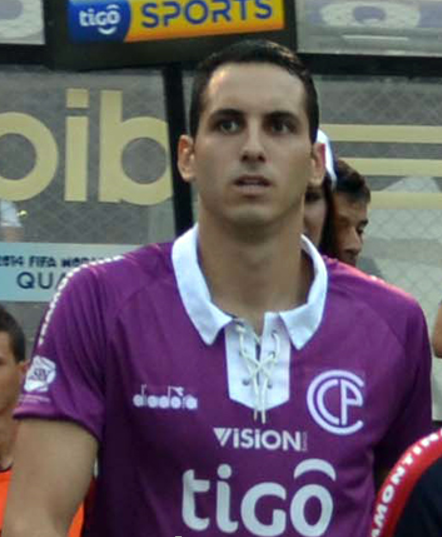
Fernández with Cerro Porteño in 2014.

Fernández started his professional career with Paraguayan Primera División club Cerro Porteño in 2007. He became Paraguayan champion with the club in the 2009 Apertura. Following the achievement, he joined Argentine Primera División side Estudiantes de La Plata. After a season in the club without any first team appearance, he joined Racing.

In August 2011, FC Utrecht announced the signing of Fernández on loan for one year to cover a possible departure of Michel Vorm.

=== Botafogo ===
On 26 November 2016, Fernandéz signed with Botafogo on a two-year contract until December 2018, moving on a free transfer.

On 9 April 2018, after good performances in the 2017 Copa Libertadores and 2018 Campeonato Carioca, Botafogo extended contract with Fernandéz until December 2021.

Fernández with Botafogo in 2022.

On 6 October 2022, he became the foreign player with the most appearances for Botafogo, surpassing his teammate Joel Carli with 188 games.

On 2 February 2023, Fernández signed a contract renewal until the end of 2024 with Botafogo.

On 19 July, Fernández returned to play for Botafogo in a 1–1 draw against the Argentine team Patronato, a game valid for the Copa Sudamericana. The game marked Gatito's return after eight months without playing. Although the goalkeeper had been fully recovered for months from the injury suffered in a game against Atlético Minero at the end of the previous year, his return to the field took a while to happen due to the good performances of his teammate Lucas Perri, who ended up taking over as the starting goalkeeper for Botafogo.

At the end of the season his contract was not renewed, so during his time at the Rio de Janeiro club, he played 222 matches, becoming the fifth goalkeeper with the most games in Botafogo's history.

== International career ==
Fernández debuted with the Paraguay U20 national team in the 2007 South American Youth Championship replacing the injured Blas Hermosilla. He was selected for the Paraguay senior squad for the 2011 Copa América, remaining an unused substitute as the team finished the tournament as the runner-up.

In 2019, Gatito Fernández was Paraguay's starting goalkeeper at the Copa América, earning "Man of the Match" honors in all four games he played. In 2024, he served as Paraguay's starting goalkeeper at the 2024 Summer Olympics in Paris. Following that tournament, he was recalled to the senior national team by coach Gustavo Alfaro, ending a two-year absence from the Paraguay senior squad.

Upon reclaiming the starting role, Fernández became a key figure in the 2026 World Cup qualifiers, playing 11 matches and keeping six clean sheets. In 2026, Gatito Fernández was selected for the World Cup squad exactly 40 years after his father, Gato Fernández, had been the starting goalkeeper at the 1986 World Cup. However, coach Gustavo Alfaro decided to use him as the backup goalkeeper.

== Career statistics ==
=== Club ===
As of 24 May 2026

Appearances and goals by club, season and competition
Club	Season	League			Cup		Continental		State League		Other		Total	
Club	Season	Division	Apps	Goals	Apps	Goals	Apps	Goals	Apps	Goals	Apps	Goals	Apps	Goals
Cerro Porteño	2007	Paraguayan Primera División	12	0	—		—		—		—		12	0
Cerro Porteño	2008	Paraguayan Primera División	35	0	—		—		—		—		35	0
Cerro Porteño	2009	Paraguayan Primera División	22	0	—		—		—		—		22	0
Cerro Porteño	2012	Paraguayan Primera División	5	0	—		2 (Note: Appearance(s) in Copa Sudamericana)	0	—		—		7	0
Cerro Porteño	2013	Paraguayan Primera División	37	0	—		2	0	—		—		39	0
Cerro Porteño	2014	Paraguayan Primera División	11	0	—		8	0	—		—		19	0
Cerro Porteño	Total		122	0	—		12	0	—		—		134	0
Estudiantes (loan)	2009–10	Argentine Primera División	0	0	—		—		—		0	0	0	0
Racing Club (loan)	2010–11	Argentine Primera División	15	0	—		—		—		—		15	0
Utrecht (loan)	2011–12	Eredivisie	13	0	0	0	—		—		—		13	0
Vitória	2014	Série A	15	0	0	0	4	0	0	0	—		19	0
Vitória	2015	Série B	24	0	0	0	—		0	0	—		24	0
Vitória	Total		39	0	0	0	4	0	0	0	—		43	0
Figueirense	2016	Série A	28	0	1	0	2	0	16 (Note: Appearance(s) in Campeonato Catarinense)	0	2 (Note: Appearance(s) in Primeira Liga)	0	49	0
Botafogo	2017	Série A	31	0	5	0	13 (Note: Appearance(s) in Copa Libertadores)	0	9 (Note: Appearance(s) in Campeonato Carioca)	0	1	0	59	0
Botafogo	2018	Série A	8	0	0	0	1	0	9	0	—		18	0
Botafogo	2019	Série A	30	0	4	0	6	0	8	0	—		48	0
Botafogo	2020	Série A	8	0	6	0	—		8	0	3	0	25	0
Botafogo	2021	Série B	0	0	0	0	—		0	0	—		0	0
Botafogo	2022	Série A	32	0	2	0	—		10	0	—		44	0
Botafogo	2023	Série A	1	0	0	0	5	0	0	0	—		6	0
Botafogo	2024	Série A	4	0	0	0	7	0	11	0	0	0	22	0
Botafogo	Total		114	0	17	0	32	0	55	0	4	0	222	0
Cerro Porteño	2025	Paraguayan Primera División	11	0	2	0	6	0	—		—		19	0
Cerro Porteño	2026	Paraguayan Primera División	4	0	1	0	0	0	0	0	1	0	6	0
Cerro Porteño	Total		15	0	3	0	0	0	0	0	1	0	25	0
Career total			346	0	21	0	56	0	71	0	7	0	501	0

=== International ===
As of match played 5 June 2026.

Appearances and goals by national team and year
National team	Year	Apps	Goals
Paraguay	2013	1	0
Paraguay	2014	3	0
Paraguay	2017	1	0
Paraguay	2018	1	0
Paraguay	2019	10	0
Paraguay	2020	1	0
Paraguay	2022	1	0
Paraguay	2024	6	0
Paraguay	2025	6	0
Paraguay	2026	1	0
Total		31	0

== Honours ==
Cerro Porteño

- Paraguayan Primera División: 2009 (apertura), 2013 (clausura), 2025 (clausura)
- Supercopa Paraguay: 2025

Estudiantes de la Plata

- FIFA Club World Cup runner-up: 2009

Botafogo

- Copa Libertadores: 2024
- Campeonato Brasileiro Série A: 2024
- Campeonato Carioca: 2018
- Campeonato Brasileiro Série B: 2021
- Taça Rio: 2023, 2024

Paraguay

- Copa América runner-up: 2011

Individual

- Copa do Brasil Best Goalkeeper: 2017
- Troféu EFE Brasil: 2017
