= Ciudad Nueva (Asunción) =

- Barrio
- Country: Paraguay
- Autonomous Capital District: Gran Asunción
- City: Asunción

Area
  - Total: 1.15 km^{2} (0.44 sq mi)

Population (2002)
  - Total: 8,584

Ciudad Nueva is a neighbourhood (barrio) of Asunción, Paraguay.
