= José Arrúa =

Paraguayan footballer (born 1988)

Personal information
- Full name: José Gabriel Arrúa Ovelar
- Date of birth: 11 January 1988 (age 38)
- Place of birth: Fernando de la Mora, Paraguay
- Height: 1.80 m (5 ft 11 in)
- Position: Midfielder

Team information
- Current team: Sportivo Trinidense (manager)

Youth career
- 2005–2009: Cerro Porteño

Senior career*
| Years | Team | Apps | (Gls) |
| 2009–2010 | Cerro Porteño | 5 | (0) |
| 2010 | Sport Colombia | 9 | (0) |
| 2011 | 3 de Febrero | 17 | (0) |

Managerial career
- 2014: Sportivo Iteño
- 2015: 3 de Febrero
- 2016: Caacupé FBC
- 2017: Fulgencio Yegros
- 2018: 3 de Febrero
- 2019: Fernando de la Mora
- 2019–2020: 2 de Mayo
- 2021: Sportivo Iteño
- 2021–: Sportivo Trinidense
- * Club domestic league appearances and goals

José Gabriel Arrúa Ovelar (born 11 January 1988) is a Paraguayan football manager and former player who played as a midfielder. He is the current manager of Sportivo Trinidense.

== Personal life ==
Arrúa's father Saturnino was also a footballer and a midfielder. He also played for Cerro.

== Honours ==
=== Manager ===
Sportivo Trinidense

- Paraguayan División Intermedia: 2022
