= César Benítez =

Paraguayan footballer (born 1990)

César Iván Benítez
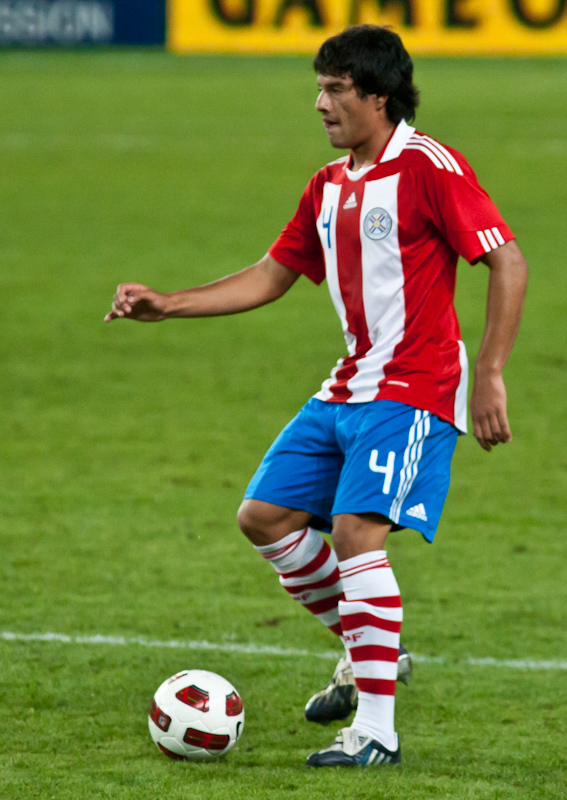

Personal information
- Date of birth: 22 May 1990 (age 36)
- Place of birth: Asunción, Paraguay
- Height: 1.76 m (5 ft 9 1/2 in)
- Position: Full-back

Team information
- Current team: Sportivo Trinidense
- Number: 23

Senior career*
Years	Team	Apps	(Gls)
2009–2017	Cerro Porteño	115	(1)
2016	→ Coritiba (loan)	15	(0)
2017	Olimpia	17	(0)
2018	Coritiba	2	(0)
2019	Sportivo Luqueño	13	(0)
2020–2022	12 de Octubre	89	(1)
2023–	Sportivo Trinidense	103	(3)

International career
2009	Paraguay U-20	4	(0)
2009–2010	Paraguay	5	(0)
- * Club domestic league appearances and goals as of 12 August 2025

César Iván Benítez (born 22 May 1990 in Asunción) is a Paraguayan football defender who currently plays for Sportivo Trinidense.

Benitez played for the Paraguay national football team at the 2009 FIFA U-20 World Cup in Egypt. He made his debut with the senior side in a friendly against Chile on 4 November 2009.
