= Estadio Ka'arendy =

- Interactive map of Estadio Ka'arendy
- Full name: Estadio Ka'arendy
- Former names: Estadio Leandro Ovelar
- Address: Juan León Mallorquín; Paraguay
- Coordinates: 25.43234°S 55.25557°W
- Capacity: 10,120
- Field size: 105 × 68 m

Tenant
- Club General Caballero

Estadio Ka'arendy, previously known as Estadio Leandro Ovelar, is a football stadium in Paraguay that is located in the downtown area of the city of Juan León Mallorquín, about 650 meters north of route PY02. After its renovation in 2022 it has a capacity of 10,120 seats. It is the home venue of Primera División club, General Caballero.

== Name changing ==
In April 2021, the club's board of directors ordered the new nomination of its sports arena as "Estadio Ka'arendy". The decision was made unanimously at the extraordinary meeting.

Ka'arendy is the previous name of the town, a name that continues in the memory of its inhabitants.
