= Estadio Luis Alberto Salinas =

Football stadium in Itauguá, Paraguay

Coordinates: 25.395917°S 57.340694°W

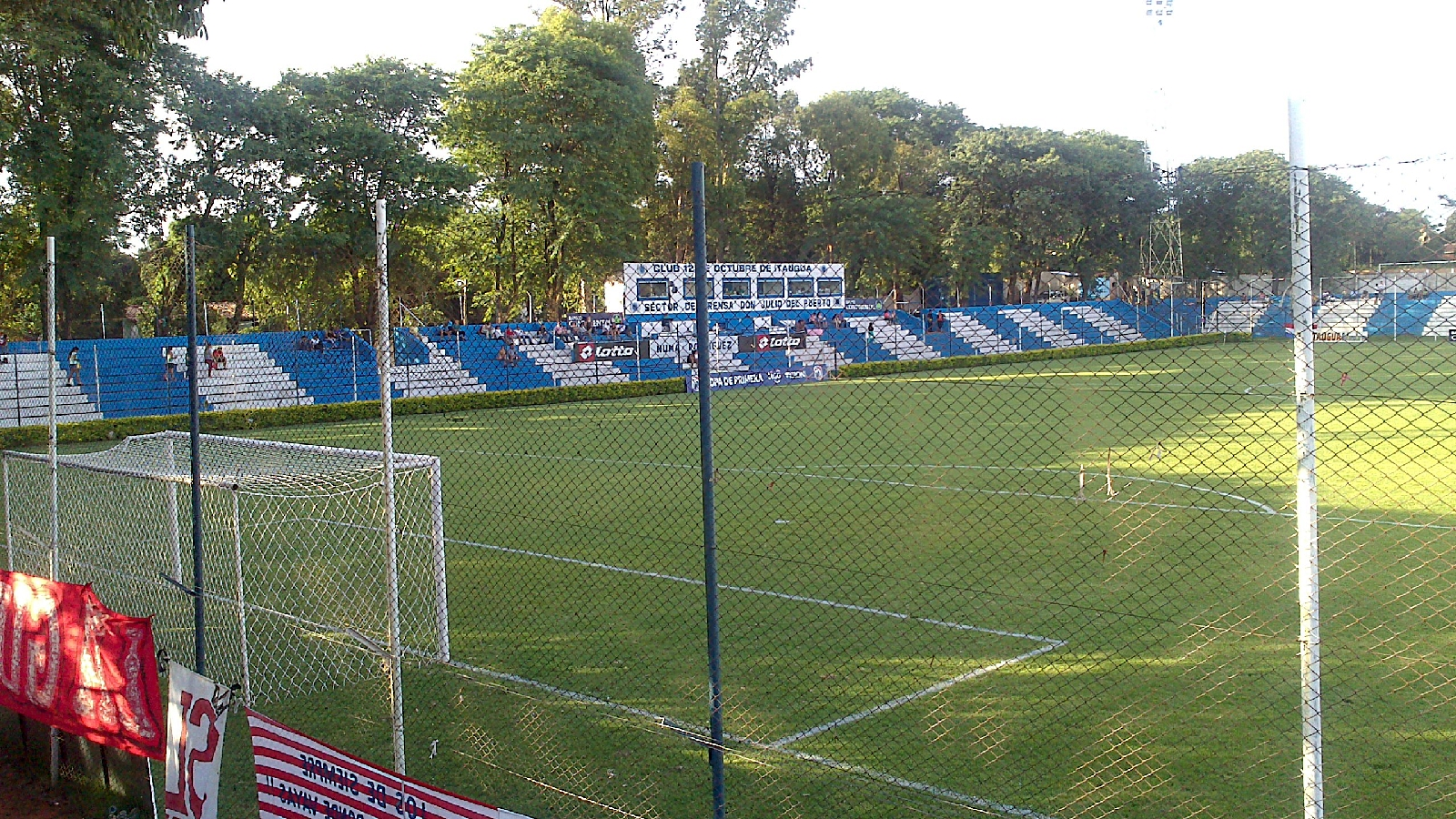
- Interactive map of Estadio Luis Alberto Salinas
- Full name: Estadio Luis Alberto Salinas Tanasio
- Former names: Estadio Juan Canuto Pettengill
- Address: Itauguá; Paraguay
- Capacity: 10,000
- Field size: 98 × 70 m

Construction
- Opened: 1965

Tenant
- 12 de Octubre FBC

The Estadio Luis Salinas Tanasio, (known as Estadio Juan Canuto Pettengill between 1972 and 2016), and officially Estadio ueno Luis Salinas Tanasio due to sponsorship by banking company Ueno, is a football stadium in Paraguay, located in the city of Itauguá, about 50 meters north of route PY02. It has a capacity of 10,000 seats.

It is the home venue of Primera División club 12 de Octubre FC.

== Name changing ==
On March 23, 2016, after forty-four years with the name "Juan Canuto Pettengill", the board of directors unanimously decided to rename the stadium to "Luis Alberto Salinas Tanasio". The modification is a posthumous tribute to former player, leader and president of the club, as well as former mayor of the city of Itauguá.
