= Estadio Ricardo Gregor =

Football stadium in Paraguay

Coordinates: 25°16′33″S 57°33′6″W

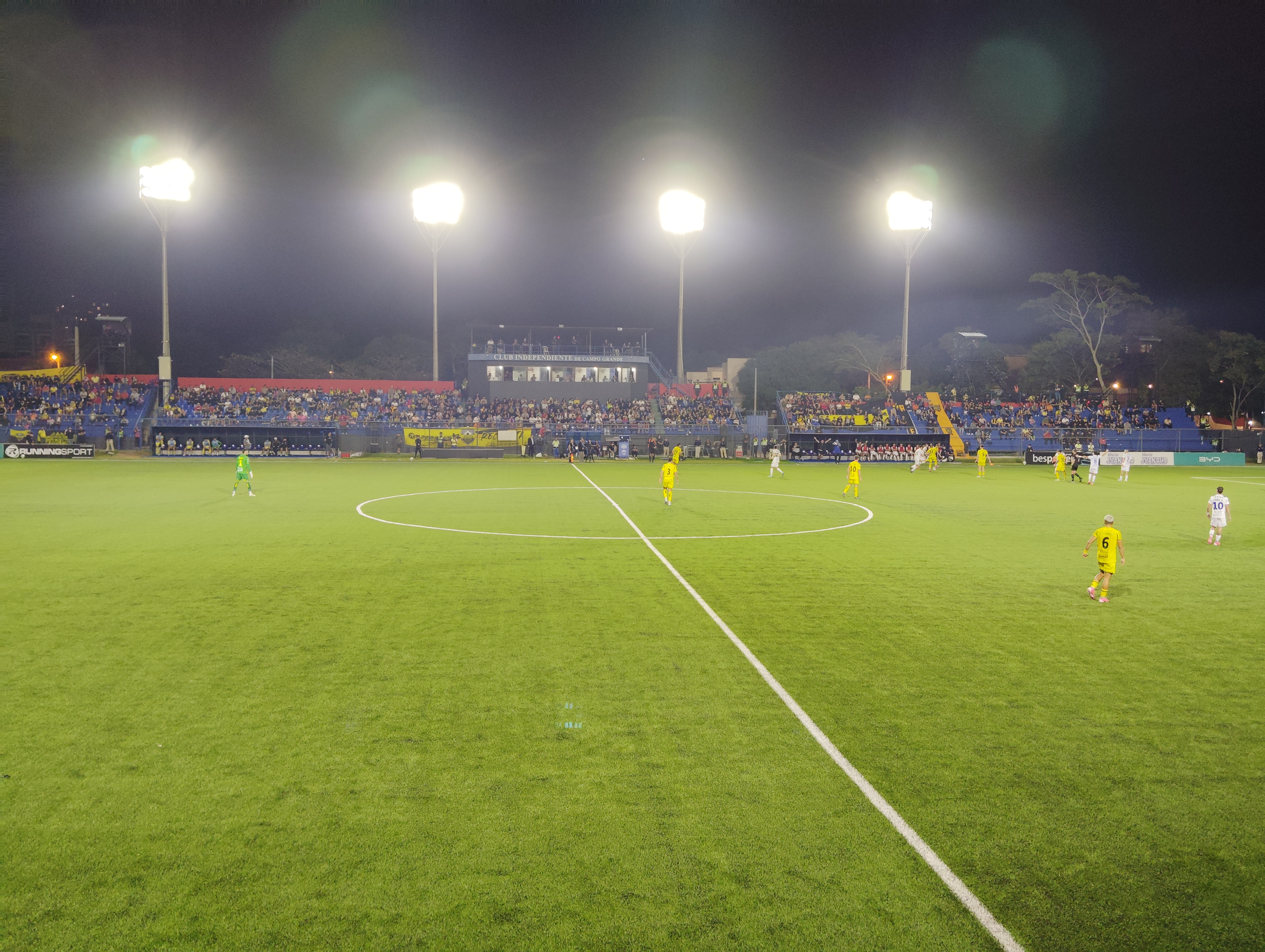
- Interactive map of Estadio Ricardo Gregor
- Address: Calle Salvador del Mundo; Asunción; Paraguay
- Capacity: 4,000

Tenants
- Independiente FBC

The Estadio Ricardo Gregor is a football stadium in Paraguay located in the neighborhood of Salvador del Mundo in Asunción, area known as Campo Grande. The stadium, which has a capacity for 4,000 people, is the home of División Intermedia club Independiente. It owes its name to a former president of the institution.

== History ==
On April 3, 2011, the venue was enabled to host a match for the Primera División, for the first time in its history. The match was against Atlético 3 de Febrero.

On October 26, 2016, the APF announced the improvements to be made to the stadium due to the promotion to the Primera División of the club. The works include the lighting system, changing rooms, booths for the press and the filling of the playing field. By the end of January 2017, the towers for the lighting system of the stadium were completed, on February 17 the lights of the stadium were turned on successfully for the first time.

The stadium reopened its doors for a Primera División match on March 17, 2017, when the venue received and defeated Deportivo Capiatá 1–0, in the seventh matchday of the Apertura tournament. In addition, the improvements introduced and the lighting system were officially inaugurated, making this the first game in history to be played at night in this stadium.

At the end of 2017, with the construction of the stands, the capacity of the stadium increased in theory to 5,500 people. Although according to the Paraguayan Football Association it is for 4,000 spectators.
