= Copa Paraguay =

- Organiser(s): APF
- Founded: 2018
- Region: Paraguay
- Teams: 74
- Qualifier for: Copa Libertadores; Supercopa Paraguay
- Current champions: General Caballero (JLM) (1st title)
- Most championships: Libertad (3 titles)
- Broadcaster: Tigo Sports
- Motto: La Copa de Todos (Everyone's cup)
- 2026 Copa Paraguay

The Copa Paraguay is a knockout football competition in men's domestic Paraguayan football, starting in 2018 and succeeding the defunct Torneo República. The project for its creation was officially presented in December 2017 and approved by the Paraguayan Football Association's Executive Committee on 20 February 2018.

The competition starts in April and ends in November, with the winner of the cup qualifying for the following year's Copa Libertadores (Copa Sudamericana until the 2022 edition). If the cup winner has already qualified for South American competitions through the league, then the cup runner-up (or the third-placed team) will qualify. If the top three teams have all already qualified for South American competitions through the league, then the best-placed team in the Paraguayan Primera División that has not yet qualified for an international competition will qualify for the Copa Libertadores.

Starting from the 2021 edition, the winner also qualifies for the Supercopa Paraguay.

== Format ==
For its first edition in 2018, the competition was divided into two stages: a preliminary stage and the national stage.

In the preliminary stage, teams from the Primera B, Primera C, and the UFI competed for 20 berths to the national stage: 7 Primera B teams, 6 from the Primera C, and 7 from the UFI qualified for the next stage of the competition.

In the national stage, the 12 Primera División teams and the 16 División Intermedia teams entered the competition, for a total of 48 teams which were drawn into 24 ties, with the winners qualifying for the second round. The 12 second round winners as well as the four best losers advanced to the round of 16. From that point onwards, the Copa Paraguay continued as a single-elimination tournament.

However, starting from the following edition, the competition was expanded from 48 to 64 teams, allowing for greater participation from teams from the lower tiers and scrapping the preliminary round. It continued being a single-elimination tournament, with all teams entering the competition in the first stage. In April 2022, APF confirmed that a total of 74 teams would join the 2022 edition.

== Results ==
Ed.	Year	Champion	Scores	Runner-up	Third place	Fourth place
1	2018	Guaraní (1)	2–2 (5–3 p)	Olimpia	Sportivo Luqueño	Resistencia
2	2019	Libertad (1)	3–0	Guaraní	Deportivo Capiatá	Sol de América
–	2020	Not played due to the COVID-19 pandemic				
3	2021	Olimpia (1)	2–2 (3–1 p)	Sol de América	Libertad	Tembetary
4	2022	Sportivo Ameliano (1)	1–1 (4–3 p)	Nacional	Guaraní	Tembetary
5	2023	Libertad (2)	1–1 (4–1 p)	Sportivo Trinidense	Nacional	Guaraní
6	2024	Libertad (3)	1–0	Nacional	Sportivo Luqueño	Guaraní
7	2025	General Caballero (JLM) (1)	1–0	2 de Mayo	Nacional	Guaraní
8	2026					

== Performance by club ==
Club	Winners	Runners-up	Winning years	Runners-up years
Libertad	3	0	2019, 2023, 2024	—
Guaraní	1	1	2018	2019
Olimpia	1	1	2021	2018
Sportivo Ameliano	1	0	2022	—
General Caballero (JLM)	1	0	2025	—
Nacional	0	2	—	2022, 2024
Sol de América	0	1	—	2021
Sportivo Trinidense	0	1	—	2023
2 de Mayo	0	1	—	2025

== Performance by leagues ==
As of 2025

League	Winners	Runners-up	Third place	Fourth place
Primera División	7	7	7	4
División Intermedia	0	0	0	1
Primera División B	0	0	0	2
