= Clementino González =

Paraguayan footballer (born 1990)

Personal information
- Full name: Clementino González Martínez
- Date of birth: 4 June 1990 (age 36)
- Place of birth: Colonia Toryvete, Paraguay
- Height: 1.86 m (6 ft 1 in)
- Position: Right winger

Senior career*
Years	Team	Apps	(Gls)
2012–2013	Cambaceres	7	(1)
2013	Cerro Porteño PF		
2013	River Plate		
2013	Independiente		
2015–2018	Central Español	53	(21)
2016	→ River Plate (loan)	2	(0)
2018–2019	Liverpool Montevideo	24	(3)
- * Club domestic league appearances and goals as of 19:12, 26 July 2020 (UTC)

Clementino González Martínez (born 4 June 1990) is a Paraguayan footballer who plays as a forward.
