= Ignacio Aliseda =

Argentine footballer (born 2000)

Personal information
- Full name: Ignacio Santiago Aliseda
- Date of birth: 14 March 2000 (age 26)
- Place of birth: Buenos Aires, Argentina
- Height: 1.69 m (5 ft 7 in)
- Position: Winger

Team information
- Current team: Cerro Porteño
- Number: 31

Youth career
- Defensa y Justicia

Senior career*
Years	Team	Apps	(Gls)
2018–2020	Defensa y Justicia	27	(2)
2020–2021	Chicago Fire	43	(5)
2022–2025	Lugano	71	(16)
2023	Lugano II	1	(0)
2025–	Cerro Porteño	5	(3)

International career
2019	Argentina U23	2	(0)
Medal record
Representing Argentina
Men's Football
Pan American Games
Gold medal – first place	2019 Lima	Team competition
- * Club domestic league appearances and goals as of 12 August 2025

Ignacio Santiago Aliseda (born 14 March 2000) is an Argentine professional footballer who plays as a winger for Paraguayan Primera División club Cerro Porteño.

== Club career ==
Aliseda began his career with Defensa y Justicia. He was moved into the club's first-team squad during the 2018–19 Argentine Primera División season. After being an unused substitute for a Copa Argentina match with Argentinos Juniors and Copa Sudamericana ties with El Nacional and Banfield, Aliseda made his professional debut in a 2018 Copa Sudamericana round of sixteen second leg encounter with Primera División counterparts Banfield. He was substituted on for Fabián Bordagaray with twenty minutes left, which preceded him netting Defensa y Justicia's second goal of a 2–0 win in stoppage time.

On 19 February 2020, Aliseda joined MLS side Chicago Fire for an undisclosed fee on a four-year deal. His first appearance came in a 2–0 loss in the MLS is Back Tournament against the San Jose Earthquakes at the ESPN Wide World of Sports Complex on 19 July, which was followed by a goal in his fourth game at home to FC Cincinnati on 25 August in MLS.

On 13 December 2021, it was announced that Aliseda would join Swiss Super League side FC Lugano on 1 January 2022.

== International career ==
In March 2018, Aliseda received a call-up to the Argentina U19s. In 2019, he made the U23s' final squad for the Pan American Games in Peru. He featured in two fixtures as Argentina won the tournament.

== Career statistics ==
As of 2 June 2024

Appearances and goals by club, season and competition
Club	Season	League			National cup		League cup		Continental		Other		Total	
Club	Season	Division	Apps	Goals	Apps	Goals	Apps	Goals	Apps	Goals	Apps	Goals	Apps	Goals
Defensa y Justicia	2018–19	Primera División	16	1	1	0	2	0	5 (Note: Appearance(s) in the Copa Sudamericana)	1	—		24	2
Defensa y Justicia	2019–20	Primera División	11	1	2	0	0	0	—		—		13	1
Defensa y Justicia	Total		27	2	3	0	2	0	5	1	—		37	3
Chicago Fire	2020	Major League Soccer	20	1	—		—		—		—		20	1
Chicago Fire	2021	Major League Soccer	23	4	—		—		—		—		23	4
Chicago Fire	Total		43	5	—		—		—		—		43	5
Lugano	2021–22	Swiss Super League	13	2	2	0	—		—		—		15	2
Lugano	2022–23	Swiss Super League	23	8	4	5	—		0	0	—		27	9
Lugano	2023–24	Swiss Super League	16	0	3	0	—		3	1	—		22	1
Lugano	Total		52	10	9	5	—		3	1	—		64	16
Career total			122	17	12	5	2	0	5	1	0	0	144	24

== Honours ==
Lugano

- Swiss Cup: 2021–22

Argentina U23

- Pan American Games: 2019
