= Jonathan Torres (footballer, born 1996) =

Argentine footballer

Personal information
- Full name: Jonathan Gabriel Torres
- Date of birth: 29 December 1996 (age 29)
- Place of birth: Santa Fe, Argentina
- Height: 1.84 m (6 ft 1/2 in)
- Position: Forward

Team information
- Current team: Cerro Porteño
- Number: 27

Youth career
- Quilmes

Senior career*
Years	Team	Apps	(Gls)
2015–2018	Quilmes	23	(2)
2018–2020	Almagro	26	(2)
2020–2024	Sarmiento	76	(25)
2023	→ Querétaro (loan)	15	(1)
2023–2024	→ Lanús (loan)	38	(6)
2025–	Cerro Porteño	24	(8)
- * Club domestic league appearances and goals as of 12 August 2025

Jonathan Gabriel Torres (born 29 December 1996) is an Argentine professional footballer who plays as a forward for Paraguayan Primera División club Cerro Porteño.

== Career ==
Quilmes were Torres' first senior club, he started playing professionally for them in 2015 when he made his debut against Rosario Central in the Argentine Primera División on 17 August; he had previously been an unused substitute in a Copa Argentina tie with Independiente Rivadavia and a league match with Tigre in the month prior. He scored his first senior goal in February 2018, netting in a 3–0 Primera B Nacional win over Brown. Overall, he scored two goals in twenty-three appearances for Quilmes. On 7 August 2018, Torres joined fellow Primera B Nacional side Almagro.

In October 2020, Torres moved to Sarmiento.

== Career statistics ==
As of 17 November 2018.

Club statistics
Club	Season	League			Cup (Note: Includes the Copa Argentina)		League Cup		Continental		Other		Total	
Club	Season	Division	Apps	Goals	Apps	Goals	Apps	Goals	Apps	Goals	Apps	Goals	Apps	Goals
Quilmes	2015	Primera División	1	0	0	0	—		—		0	0	1	0
Quilmes	2016	Primera División	0	0	0	0	—		—		0	0	0	0
Quilmes	2016–17	Primera División	6	0	0	0	—		—		0	0	6	0
Quilmes	2017–18	Primera B Nacional	16	2	0	0	—		—		0	0	16	2
Quilmes	Total		23	2	0	0	—		—		0	0	23	2
Almagro	2018–19	Primera B Nacional	10	2	2	0	—		—		0	0	12	2
Career total			33	4	2	0	—		—		0	0	35	4
