= Sportivo Trinidense =

Paraguayan football club

- Full name: Club Sportivo Trinidense
- Nickname: El Triqui
- Founded: 11 August 1935; 90 years ago
- Ground: Estadio Martín Torres, Asunción, Paraguay
- Capacity: 3,000
- Chairman: Norman Rieder
- Manager: José Arrúa
- League: División de Honor
- 2025: División de Honor, 4th of 12
Home colours	Away colours	Third colours

Sportivo Trinidense is a Paraguayan football club based in the barrio of Santísima Trinidad, in Asunción. The club was founded on 11 August 1935. Their home games are played at the Estadio Martín Torres. Their traditional rival is Rubio Ñu, also from barrio Santísima Trinidad. Trinidense currently plays in the Paraguayan Primera División.

== History ==
The first time the club played in the first division was in 1994.

In 2010 Trinidense returned to the Paraguayan First Division after winning the Division Intermedia tournament in 2009 and also qualified for the Copa Libertadores in 2023 for the first time.

== Honours ==
- Paraguayan Second Division
  - Champions (2): 2009, 2022
  - Runners-up (3): 1993, 2006, 2016
- Paraguayan Third Division
  - Champions (4): 1982, 1987, 1990, 2002

== Current Squad ==
As of 11 April, 2026

Note: Flags indicate national team as defined under FIFA eligibility rules; some limited exceptions apply. Players may hold more than one non-FIFA nationality.

No.	Pos.	Nation	Player
1	FW	URU	Matías Dufour
2	DF	PAR	Armando Ruiz Díaz
3	DF	PAR	David Villalba
4	DF	PAR	Diego Melgarejo
5	MF	PAR	Ariel Gauto
6	DF	PAR	Axel Cañete
7	FW	PAR	Néstor Camacho
8	MF	PAR	Luis de la Cruz
9	FW	PAR	Oscar Giménez
10	FW	ARG	Nicolás Maná
11	MF	PAR	Ronaldo Báez
12	GK	PAR	Victor Samudio
13	MF	PAR	Randy Báez
14	DF	PAR	Sergio Mendoza
16	MF	PAR	Jorge Marcelino (on loan from Cerro Porteño)
17	FW	PAR	Joel Román
18	FW	PAR	Fernando Romero

No.	Pos.	Nation	Player
19	FW	PAR	Alan Cano (on loan from Club Olimpia)
20	FW	PAR	Clementino González
21	MF	PAR	Gustavo Viera
22	FW	PAR	Pedro Zarza (on loan from Club Olimpia)
23	DF	PAR	César Benítez
24	MF	PAR	Fabrizio Baruja (on loan from Club Olimpia)
26	DF	ARG	Franco Ortellado
27	DF	ARG	Maximiliano Centurión
29	FW	ARG	Tomás Rayer
30	FW	PAR	Bruno Valdez
31	DF	PAR	Tobías Morinigo (on loan from Club Olimpia)
33	DF	PAR	Denis Acosta
34	DF	PAR	Fernando Román
37	MF	ARG	Lucas González
40	DF	URU	Agustín Da Silveira

=== Out on loan ===
Note: Flags indicate national team as defined under FIFA eligibility rules; some limited exceptions apply. Players may hold more than one non-FIFA nationality.

No.	Pos.	Nation	Player
—	FW	ARG	Alexander Sosa (at Tristán Suárez until 31 December 2025)

== Notable players ==
To appear in this section a player must have either:

- Played at least 125 games for the club.
- Set a club record or won an individual award while at the club.
- Been part of a national team at any time.
- Played in the first division of any other football association (outside of Paraguay).
- Played in a continental and/or intercontinental competition.
- Paraguayan players
- (Paraguay) Juan Iturbe (2006)
- (Paraguay) Arístides Rojas (2006)
- (Paraguay) Osvaldo Mendoza (2006, 2010-2011)
- (Paraguay) Dario Lezcano (2007–2008)
- (Paraguay) Juan Cardozo (2010)

Non-CONMEBOL players

- (Cameroon) Kenneth Nkweta Nju
- (Japan) Yuki Tamura (2010)
- (Indonesia) Syahrizal Syahbuddin (2011)
- (South Korea) Hee-Mang Jang (2017–)
