= Doctor Juan León Mallorquín District =

Coordinates: 25°25′S 55°15′W

Dr Juan León Mallorquín District
- Town & District
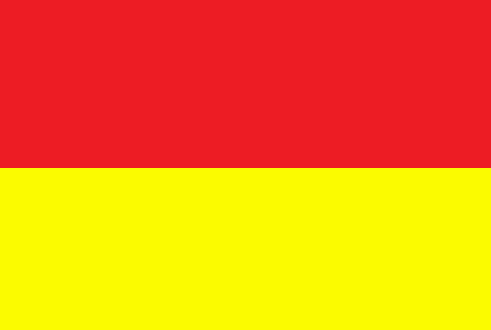
- Flag
- Interactive map of Dr Juan León Mallorquín District
- Country: Paraguay
- Department: Alto Paraná Department
- Elevation: 240 m (790 ft)

Population (2016)
  - Total: 21,789
- Climate: Cfa

Doctor Juan León Mallorquin is a town and district of the Alto Paraná Department, Paraguay. The official name of the town is Juan León Mallorquín. The Estadio Ka'arendy is located in the town.
