= Club General Caballero (Juan León Mallorquín) =

Paraguayan football club

General Caballero JLM
- Full name: Club General Bernardino Caballero
- Nicknames: General del Este; Rojo de Mallorquín; Luchador de Ka'arendy
- Founded: 21 June 1962; 64 years ago
- Ground: Estadio Ka'arendy; Doctor Juan León Mallorquín, Paraguay
- Capacity: 10,120
- Chairman: Julio Aldama
- Manager: Humberto Ovelar
- League: División Intermedia
- 2025: División de Honor, 11th of 12 (Relegated by average)
Home colours	Away colours	Third colours

Club General Bernardino Caballero, commonly known as General Caballero JLM, is a Paraguayan football club based in Juan León Mallorquín, Alto Paraná. The club plays in the División Intermedia, the second division of the Paraguayan football league system, and hold their home games at the Estadio Ka'arendy which has a capacity of 10,120 people.

== History ==
Founded on 21 June 1962 by a group of residents of Juan León Mallorquín, the club was one of the founders of the Liga Ka’arendy de Fútbol, the local football competition, of which it is one of the most winning clubs. General Caballero first entered a nationwide competition in 2003, taking part in the Copa de Campeones de la UFI, but failing to achieve promotion to the División Intermedia. After competing again in 2004 and 2006 and missing out on promotion both times, the club returned to national competitions in the 2017 Primera B Nacional, but was knocked out in the first stage.

In the 2018 season, General Caballero won the Primera B Nacional by defeating Nacional de Primero de Marzo in the final, but had to play a promotion play-off against the Primera B Metropolitana runners-up Tacuary since the Primera B Nacional championship does not award its winner a direct promotion berth in even years. After tying 1–1 in the first leg, General Caballero beat Tacuary in the return match by a 2–0 score and reached the second division for the first time in their history.

In the 2019 season, General Caballero managed to end in eighth place of the División Intermedia with 41 points in 30 games, whilst in 2021 they won the competition and were promoted to Primera División, clinching the title with a 4–1 win at home against Rubio Ñu. As 2021 Intermedia champions, they qualified for the 2022 Copa Sudamericana and also established a record of points earned in the second tier tournament with 73 points.

General Caballero played its first match in the top tier on 4 February 2022, drawing 2–2 away to Olimpia, while in their first participation in the Copa Sudamericana they knocked out Sol de América in the first round to reach the group stage, where they ended third in their group. In their first season in Primera División, General Caballero avoided relegation and clinched qualification for the Copa Sudamericana for the second year in a row, failing to advance to the group stage after losing to Tacuary on penalties.

After four seasons in the top flight, General Caballero were relegated to División Intermedia at the end of the 2025 season, but in that same year they won the Copa Paraguay by defeating 2 de Mayo 1–0 in the final and became the first club from outside Greater Asunción to win a Paraguayan football title. However, their relegation rendered them ineligible to enter the 2026 Copa Libertadores as Copa Paraguay champions.

== Honours ==
- Copa Paraguay
  - Winners (1): 2025
- División Intermedia
  - Winners (1): 2021
- Primera División B Nacional
  - Winners (1): 2018
