= Saltos del Guairá =

- City
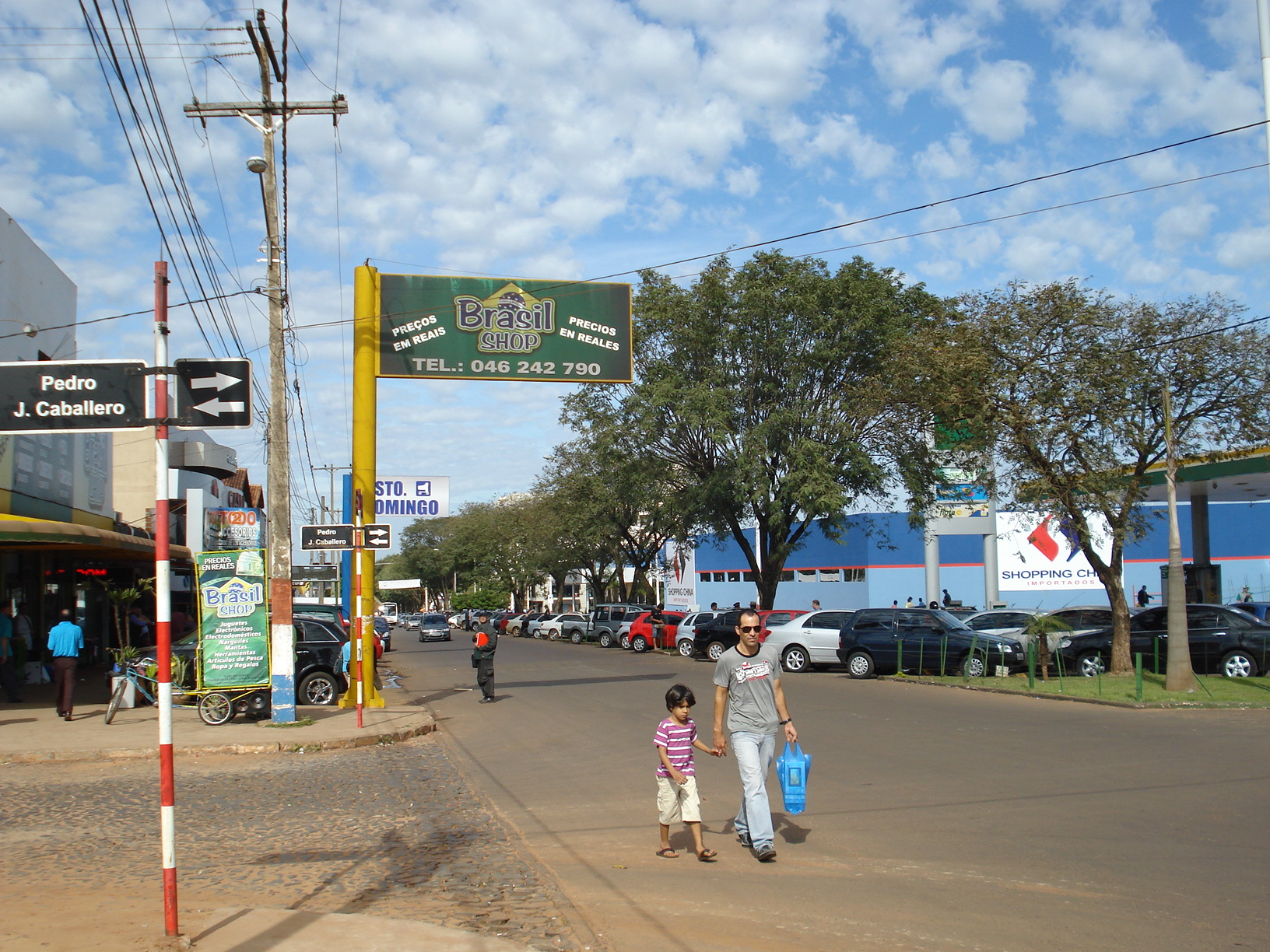

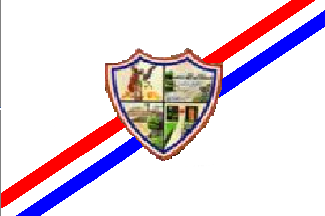
- Flag

- Location within Paraguay
- Coordinates: 24°1′12″S 54°20′24″W
- Country: Paraguay
- Department: Canindeyú
- Founded: March 3, 1959

Government
  - Intendente Municipal: Eduardo Paniagua Duarte

Population (2021)
  - Total: 23,536
- Time zone: UTC-03 (PYT)
- Postal code: 7800
- Area code: (595) (46)

Saltos del Guairá (Spanish pronunciation: [ˈsaltos ðel ɣwajˈɾa]) is a city in Paraguay and the capital of Canindeyú department. It is located about 200 km north of Ciudad del Este. It borders the Brazilian municipality of Guaíra, across the Paraná River which marks the border between Paraguay and Brazil.

The name "Guaíra" comes from the Tupi language and means "place difficult to access". The name "Saltos del Guairá", which means "Guairá Falls" in Spanish, is named after the Guaíra Falls (just like its Brazilian twin city), which were located on the border with Brazil. The falls were submerged after the construction of the Itaipu Dam in 1982 created the Itaipú lake.

The origins of Saltos del Guairá date back to March 3 of 1959 when a private company called "Colonizadora Salto del Guairá S.A" was created according to a note received by the firm's directory, formed by Mr. José Luís Serrati, Mr. Ibrahin Abud and Mr. Carlos Ricardo Méndez Goncalvez. Before its foundation, the area was named "Reserva N°10", and later, by a government law on October 17 of 1972, the Church council was created. This depended of Hernandarias District, and, at that time it was integrated by three renowned neighbors: Col (SR.) Isabelino Pimienta Medina (+) as the president, Carmelo Peralta as the treasurer, and for the secretary position, Prof. Pedro Ramón Girett.

On July 30, 1973, the Paraguayan Government passed law n°390 officially creating the city of Salto del Guairá and also setting a third category Municipality, separating it from the district of Hernandarias. That same year, with law n°426 of Territory political division, on expense of the separation of the territories of Caaguazú and Alto Paraná that loses all the north area of the Itambey river, with the district of Salto del Guairá.

The Municipal board requested to be elevated to first category on May 29 of 1974, based on the legal dispositions and for having the requirements demanded. In consequence by Decree Law 7131 dated July 2 that year, it promoted to the First Class City of Salto del Guairá, becoming capital of Canindeyú Department.

Its establishment coincides with the period of advancing agricultural frontier eastward, the construction of the Itaipu Dam and the extinction of the waterfalls in Saltos del Guairá.

In 2023, the city name was changed from "Salto del Guairá" to "Saltos del Guairá".

== Geography ==
Saltos del Guairá is in the Department of Canindeyú, the eastern of the country, its geographical location is latitude 24 º 04 'S and longitude 54 ° 20 W. This makes District boundaries to the north with the cities of Novo Mundo (MS) and Guaira (PR), Brazil as the latter taking the limit Paraná River and east, separated from this country in the mountains Amambay and Mbarakayú and the Paraná River, respectively. To the south the river divides the Itambey Department of Alto Paraná and the mountains of San Joaquin Caaguazú. To the west, the rivers Curuguaty and Corrientes separate them from the Department of San Pedro.

Canindeyú department is a predominantly rural for approximately 8 of every 10 inhabitants live in the countryside.

=== Climate ===
It has a pleasant climate for his height (200m.snm) with around 1,483 mm. For rainfall, 21 °C average annual temperature, with between 0 °C July and August as a minimum and 39 °C, the maximum. The rate of evaporation is 1,073.

Climate data for Salto del Guairá (1991–2020)
Month	Jan	Feb	Mar	Apr	May	Jun	Jul	Aug	Sep	Oct	Nov	Dec	Year
Mean daily maximum °C (°F)	33.3 (91.9)	32.7 (90.9)	31.9 (89.4)	29.6 (85.3)	25.6 (78.1)	24.4 (75.9)	24.2 (75.6)	26.7 (80.1)	28.4 (83.1)	30.3 (86.5)	31.4 (88.5)	32.6 (90.7)	29.3 (84.7)
Daily mean °C (°F)	26.1 (79.0)	25.7 (78.3)	24.9 (76.8)	22.6 (72.7)	18.9 (66.0)	17.8 (64.0)	17.2 (63.0)	19.0 (66.2)	21.0 (69.8)	23.4 (74.1)	24.3 (75.7)	25.5 (77.9)	22.2 (72.0)
Mean daily minimum °C (°F)	21.7 (71.1)	21.4 (70.5)	20.5 (68.9)	17.8 (64.0)	14.2 (57.6)	13.1 (55.6)	11.8 (53.2)	13.1 (55.6)	15.7 (60.3)	18.7 (65.7)	19.4 (66.9)	20.9 (69.6)	17.4 (63.3)
Average precipitation mm (inches)	157.7 (6.21)	154.0 (6.06)	125.4 (4.94)	126.2 (4.97)	153.7 (6.05)	100.3 (3.95)	84.4 (3.32)	70.7 (2.78)	123.2 (4.85)	207.8 (8.18)	179.3 (7.06)	217.4 (8.56)	1,700.1 (66.93)
Source: NOAA

=== Hydrography ===
The areas occupied by the district have two major classes of surface drainage, the water catchment area of river Piratiy and river Carapa.

== Population and surface ==
The District of Saltos del Guairá has a total population of 145841 inhabitants; density; 9.9 inhabitants/km2 and the surface is 14,667 km2.

== Political Division ==
Capital: Saltos del Guairá

It is divided into nine districts: Saltos del Guairá, Itanará, Ypehú, Corpus Christi, Gen. Francisco Álvarez Caballero, Curuguaty, Ygatimi, La Paloma and Katueté.

== Infrastructure ==
The city of Saltos del Guairá, as a pole of development in the north of the country has an infrastructure which is endowed with public buildings, government, military establishments, public and private hospitals, places of sport and recreation, commercial premises, schools, colleges, universities and religious temples.

== Economy ==
The department's principal economical activity is tourist commerce, selling tons of products to Brazilians. Also important is agriculture, especially the cultivation of soy by its largest production volume. Other important crops are maize, sugarcane, wheat and cotton.

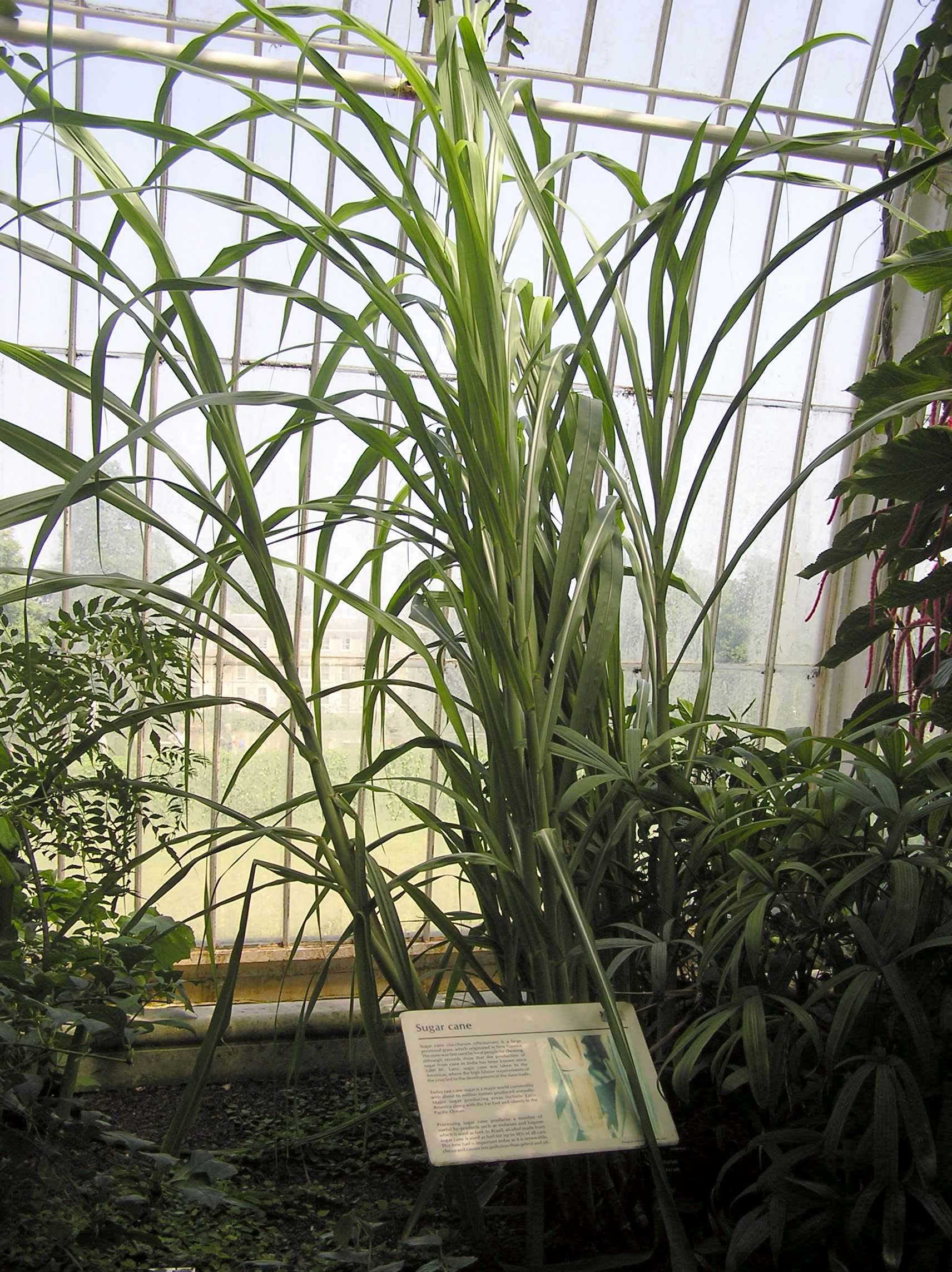
Sugar Cane

The rugged topography, with broad valleys and flat and undulating terrain encourage farming department, which places it in third place on the production of cattle, at the national level. It also has a large stock of pigs and cattle on a smaller scale produce horses and goats.

Among the main branches of industrial activities developed, we can mention because of its importance as follows: manufacture of parts and pieces of carpentry for buildings and transportation activities, storage and warehousing and timber, bakery developing, manufacturing ceramic not refractory to use in the structural development of dairy products among others.

== Education ==
Canindeyú has a low educational level and a significant proportion of the population does not have any instructions.

del Guairá has three schools and fourteen associated primary schools for basic education, six schools of secondary level, a Faculty of Law and Social Sciences and one of Economics, a subsidiary of the National University of Ciudad del Este. It also has the U. T C. D and U. P. A. P

== Health ==
The health infrastructure, measured in terms of number of centers, health posts, hospitals and beds available, although it has been increasing, remains in deficit in relation with the population size. Currently, the department has 38 health facilities.

== Communications ==
The city has the communications network TELECEL, Copaco, Personal and CTI with a central machine, through which subscribers can communicate directly with the capital, other cities in the country and the world.

The media and television network Canindeyú 95.5, 90.3 Radio Salto del Guairá, Radio Tricolor 103.9 Mbaracayu and cable TV. Besides the representatives of Ultima Hora, ABC Color and Semanario Regional Paranazâo River.

== Roads ==
The Paraná River and the Itaipu Lake, with its strong potential waterway, have a reduced impact, becoming international channels of communication with Brazilian surrounding populations, such as the Mundo Novo and Guaira, with which there is a rafts system connection. Its main lines of communication are the land, although still unpaved for the most part, as the route 10 "La Residenta", which crosses the department from east to west and arrives at Saltos del Guairá, with a branch until Ypehú And one that goes to Corpus Christi and it also joins to the superhighway that links with the department of Alto Paraná and other departments and major centers in the country.

Canindeyú has 1.056,2 km. of departmental roads and no paved neighborhoods. It also has airstrips for small-size airplanes.

== Consular representation ==
Consulate of Brazil

Brazil has a Consulate in Saltos del Guairá.

== Sources ==
- World Gazeteer: Paraguay – World-Gazetteer.com
- Geografía del Paraguay - Editorial Hispana Paraguay S.R.L.- 1a. Edición 1999 - Asunción Paraguay
- Geografía Ilustrada del Paraguay - ISBN 99925-68-04-6 - Distribuidora Arami S.R.L.
- La Magia de nuestra tierra. Fundación en Alianza. Asunción. 2007.
