= Football in Paraguay =

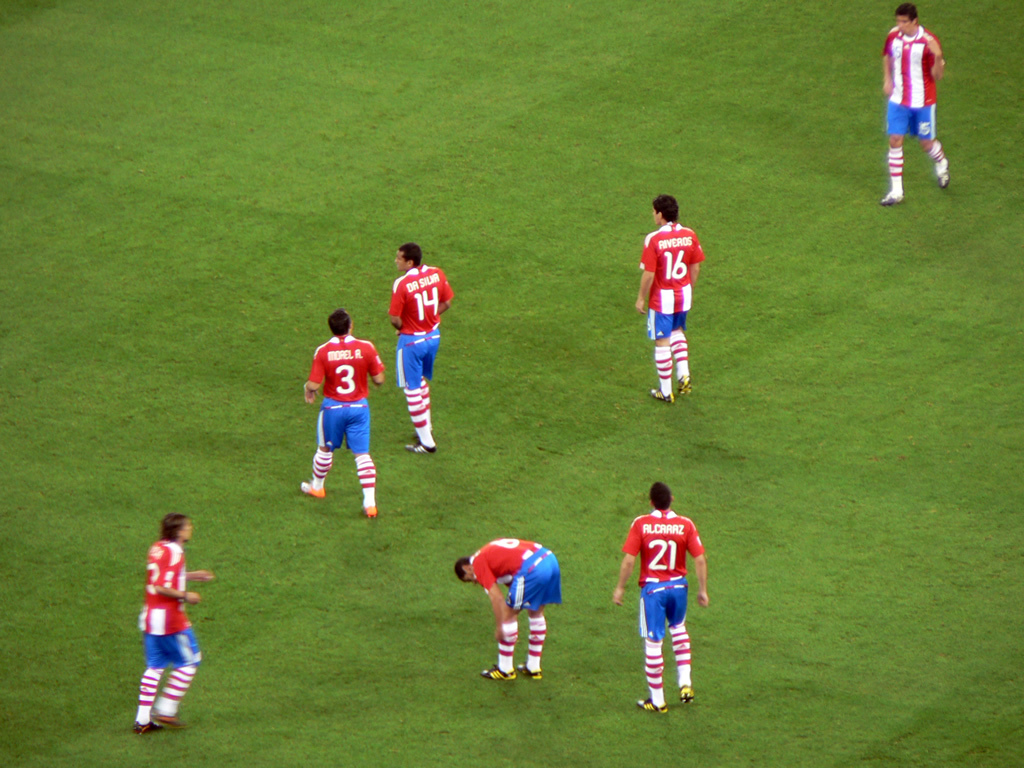
- Paraguay's national team at the 2010 FIFA World Cup in South Africa
- Country: Paraguay
- Governing body: Asociación Paraguaya de Fútbol
- National team: Paraguay
- First played: 1867

National competitions
- FIFA World Cup; Confederations Cup; Copa América

Club competitions
- List: League: Paraguayan Primera División División Intermedia Tercerca Division Cuarta Division; Cups: Copa Paraguay Torneo Republica (defunct)

International competitions
- FIFA Club World Cup; Copa Libertadores; Copa Sudamericana

Audience records
- Single match: Olimpia Asunción v. Cerro Porteño, 1983 (49, 095)

Football is by far the most popular sport in Paraguay, with approximately three-quarters of the people in Paraguay interested in football. Paraguay's national team has played at nine FIFA World Cup competitions and has won two Copa América tournaments. Olimpia Asunción is the country's most successful club in domestic and international competitions. Paraguay's football leagues are divided into four divisions. In 2020, Paraguay's top-tier was ranked 8th in the world by the IFFHS.

== History ==
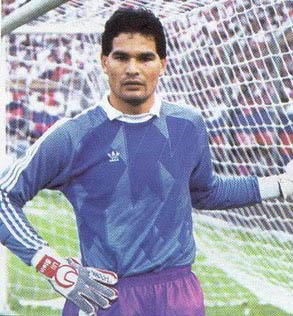
Paraguay's biggest star, José Luís Chilavert was chosen by the IFFHS as the best goalkeeper in the world on three occasions, namely in 1995, 1997 and 1998, and figures amongst 48 legendary players by the IFFHS

Football arrived to Paraguay in the late 1800s. There are differing versions as to how this happened. The most commonly held account is that of William Paats. This account has much primary source documentation (newspaper articles) As this version goes, football was first introduced in Paraguay by Dutchman William Paats, who moved from the Netherlands to Asunción (the capital of Paraguay) in 1888. During a trip to Buenos Aires Paats bought a football and brought it back to Asunción in order to teach the sport, which was unknown among Paraguayans. At first, football was only practiced by the "elite" (upper class) but it soon became very popular and spread quickly throughout the whole country to people of all social classes.

Another version brings the genesis of football in Paraguay a bit further back, to 1886 and in the area around Borja. Miguel Angel Bestard, in his authoritative volume "Paraguay: One Century of Football" recounts a story about how English railroad workers organized games against the local Paraguayans. The English team was named "Everton", as a clear homage to the club from Liverpool, England, in the United Kingdom.

In 1900, small tournaments were held at the Plaza de Armas, a plaza located in downtown Asunción. Because of the huge success of the tournaments and the large attendances for the games, Paats decided to found the first Paraguayan football club, which he named Olimpia Football Club (later renamed Club Olimpia) in 1902. By 1906 the number of football clubs in Paraguay had increased and the Paraguayan Football Association (governing body of football in Paraguay) was founded. In 1910, Paraguay formed its first national squad to play against the squad from Corrientes, Argentina, but it would have to wait till 1919 for the Argentine national team to take a boat upriver on the Parana River and visit Asuncion for the first official international games Paraguay would ever play.

The Paraguayan Football Association joined CONMEBOL in 1921, and FIFA in 1925.

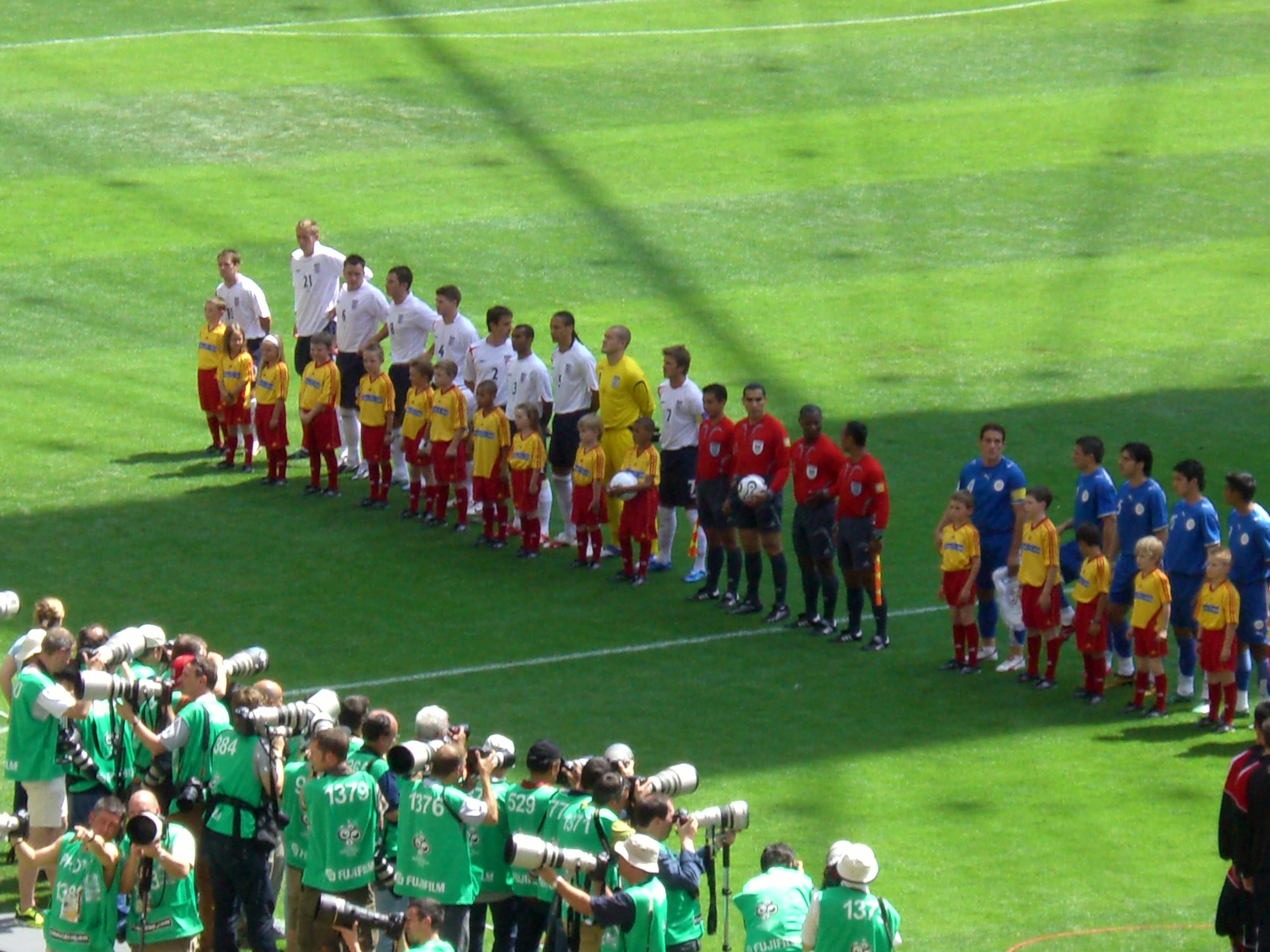
Paraguay against England at the 2006 FIFA World Cup

Football has grown enormously since then, and there are over 1600 teams spread throughout Paraguay participating in bla leagues. Each of those teams try to make their way to the first division by clearing the different levels of lower divisions. The growth and evolution of Paraguayan football can be seen in the achievements made in the club level and by the Paraguay national football team. The national team has participated in eight FIFA World Cups, won two Copa América tournaments, and earned a silver medal at the Olympic Games in 2004. All these accomplishments established Paraguay as the fourth most successful football nation in South America behind Argentina, Brazil and Uruguay. At the club level, Olimpia Asunción has won a total of eight international tournaments, including three Copa Libertadores and one Intercontinental Cup.

Among the most important and successful football players in Paraguayan history are Arsenio Erico, Aurelio González, Romerito and José Luis Chilavert.

In 2016, Roque Santa Cruz was regarded as one of the best players in the nation's history.

== National team ==
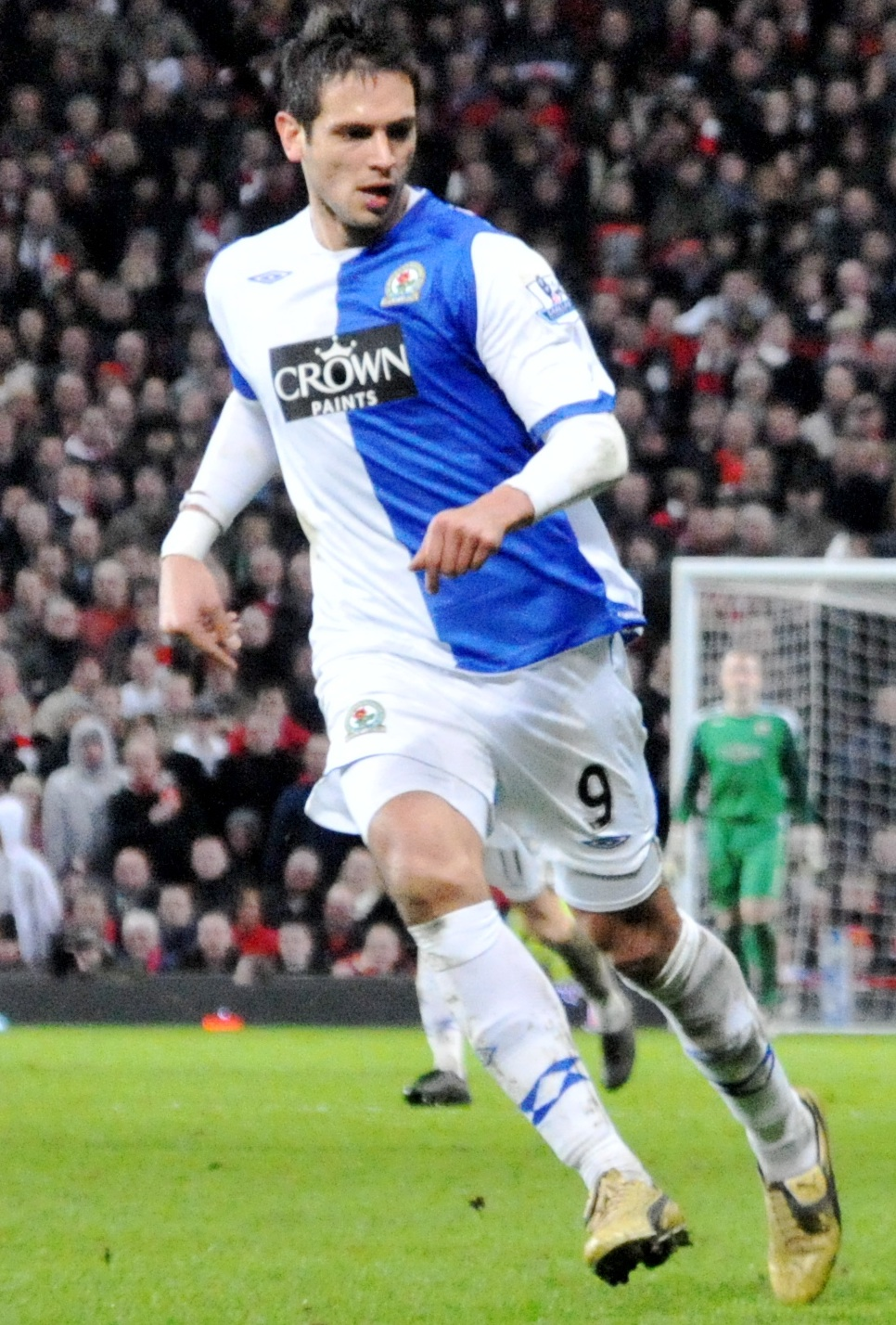
Roque Santa Cruz is the national team's highest goal scorer with 32 goals

Paraguay's men's national team, nicknamed the Albirroja, is controlled by the Paraguayan Football Association (Asociación Paraguaya de Fútbol). The team has qualified for nine FIFA World Cup competitions, with their best performance coming in 2010 when they reached the quarter-finals. Paraguay has been crowned champions of the Copa América on two occasions (in 1953 and 1979). Their highest FIFA World Rankings was 8th (March 2001) and their lowest was 103rd (May 1995). Paraguay was awarded second place with Best Move of the Year in 1996 for their rise in the FIFA Rankings. The team's most successful period was under the coaching of Argentine Gerardo Martino, who was awarded with the South American Coach of the Year in 2007 and took Paraguay to the quarter-finals of the World Cup for the first time in 2010 and also to the final of the 2011 Copa América, where Paraguay finished as runners-up. In Paraguay's entire history at the FIFA World Cup, only Carlos Gamarra and José Luis Chilavert have both been selected as part of the All-Star Team, being for the 1998 edition. Paulo da Silva holds the most appearances for the team with 148 matches and Roque Santa Cruz is the all-time leading goal scorer with 32 goals.

The women's team of Paraguay, also known as Albirroja, has lesser success, having never qualified for a single FIFA Women's World Cup, but has seen its recent rise in fortune. In the 2022 Copa América Femenina, Paraguay reached the semi-finals for only the second time after 2006, assuring them of a play-off spot for the 2023 FIFA Women's World Cup.

== Television and media ==
Television coverage of Paraguay's top-tier league, the Copa Paraguay and most of the second-tier, third-tier and fourth-tier leagues are televisionally transmitted by:

- Multideporte
- Unicanal
- Tigo Sports
- Tigo Max
- Telefuturo
- Paravisión
- TVC Sports 2
- GolTV
- TVC Sports

Internet coverage of Paraguayan football was accessible online until 2015 by football writer and Guinness World Records Latin American representative Ralph Hannah.

== League system ==
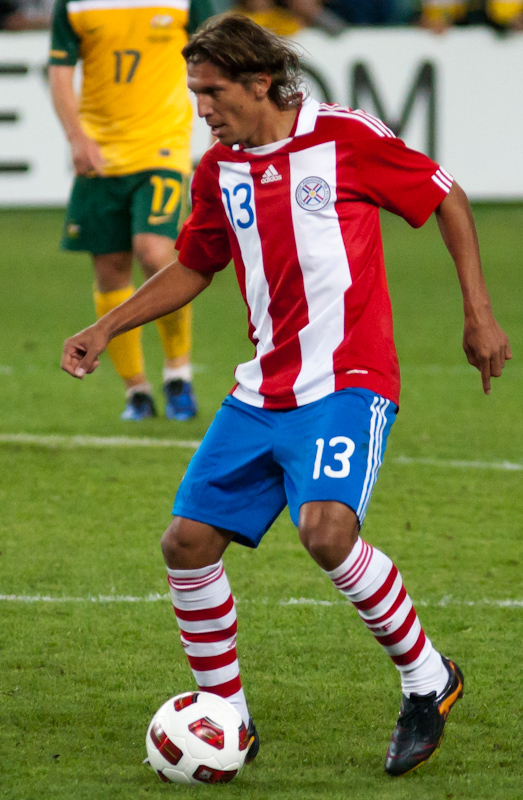
Former national team player Enrique Vera started his career in Paraguay's lower leagues

Paraguay's Football League System is divided into four divisions:

- Primera División
- División Intermedia
- Tercera División
- Cuarta División

Promotion to the top-tier, second-tier and third-tier leagues begins from the country's fourth-tier leagues, regional and metropolitana. A club is disaffiliated from the fourth division if it finishes the season in the last position of the table.

Past Paraguay national team players, including Enrique Vera, Óscar Cardozo, Nelson Haedo Valdez, Antolín Alcaraz, Elvis Marecos, Pablo Zeballos, Paulo da Silva, Cristian Riveros and Víctor Cáceres all began their careers in Paraguay's lower leagues.

As of the 2021 season, the winner of the División Intermedia would qualify directly for the Copa Sudamericana competition of the following season.

== Women's football ==
The Paraguayan women's football championship is the top-level league competition for women's football in Paraguay. The winner qualifies for the Copa Libertadores de Fútbol Femenino, the South American Champions League. The competition is organised by the Paraguayan Football Association.

== Superclásico ==
The Paraguayan derby or superclásico is between Club Olimpia Asunción and Club Cerro Porteño.

== Players and records ==
=== Paraguayan Footballer of the Year ===
The Paraguayan Footballer of the Year is an award given to the best Paraguayan professional football player every year. The award began officially in 1997 and it is presented by Paraguayan newspaper ABC Color.

Year	Player	Club(s)	Ref.
1997	Carlos Gamarra	(Portugal) Benfica	
1998	Carlos Gamarra	(Brazil) Corinthians	
1999	Roque Santa Cruz	(Paraguay) Olimpia (Germany) Bayern Munich (Note: Santa Cruz played the first half of 1999 for Olimpia, before being transferred to Bayern Munich in August 1999.)	
2000	José Cardozo	(Mexico) Toluca	
2001	Roberto Acuña	(Spain) Zaragoza	
2002	José Cardozo	(Mexico) Toluca	
2003	José Cardozo	(Mexico) Toluca	
2004	Justo Villar	(Argentina) Newell's Old Boys	
2005	Julio dos Santos	(Paraguay) Cerro Porteño	
2006	Óscar Cardozo	(Paraguay) Nacional (Argentina) Newell's Old Boys (Note: Cardozo played the first half of 2006 for the Nacional, before being transferred to Newell's Old Boys in the second half of 2006.)	
2007	Salvador Cabañas	(Mexico) América	
2008	Claudio Morel Rodríguez	(Argentina) Boca Juniors	
2009	Óscar Cardozo	(Portugal) Benfica	
2010	Lucas Barrios	(Germany) Borussia Dortmund	
2011	Pablo Zeballos	(Paraguay) Olimpia	
2012	Pablo Aguilar	(Paraguay) Sportivo Luqueño (Mexico) Tijuana (Note: Aguilar played the first half of 2012 on loan to Sportivo Luqueño, and the second half of 2012 on loan to Tijuana.)	
2013	Ángel Romero	(Paraguay) Cerro Porteño	
2014	Fernando Fernández	(Paraguay) Guaraní	
2015	Derlis González	(Ukraine) Dynamo Kyiv	
2016	Rodrigo Rojas	(Paraguay) Cerro Porteño	
2017	Miguel Almirón	(United States) Atlanta United	
2018	Miguel Almirón	(United States) Atlanta United	
2019	Roque Santa Cruz	(Paraguay) Olimpia	

=== Primera División Paraguaya Topscorers ===
The following list only comprises the professional era and is missing data from 1906 to 1934 (amateur era). A Top 10 table follows.

Nationality	Player	Goals	Season
Paraguay	Flaminio Silva	34	1936
Paraguay	Fernando Fernández	31	2014
Paraguay	Santiago Salcedo	30	2015
Paraguay	José Vinsac	30	1940
Paraguay	Teófilo Salinas	28	1939
Uruguay	Hernán Rodrigo López	27	2006
Argentina	Héctor Núñez	27	1994
Paraguay	Leocadio Marín	27	1947
Paraguay	Atilio Mellone	27	1943
Paraguay	Roque Santa Cruz	26	2019

=== Players who have played for both clubs in the Superclásico ===
Players who have played for Cerro Porteño and Olimpia Asunción. An Incomplete List follows.

- (Paraguay) Carlos Bonet
- (Paraguay) Carlos Gamarra
- (Paraguay) Casiano Delvalle
- (Paraguay) Diego Barreto
- (Argentina) Fabian Caballero
- (Paraguay) Fredy Bareiro
- (Paraguay) Gabriel Gonzalez
- (Paraguay) Ivan Torres
- (Paraguay) Nelson Cuevas
- (Paraguay) Pablo Zeballos
- (Paraguay) Rodrigo Rojas
- (Argentina) Sergio Goycochea
- (Paraguay) Willian Candia

=== Foreigner football players ===
==== CONMEBOL foreign football players ====
For CONMEBOL or South American foreign football players in Paraguay, Argentina, Brazil and Uruguay are the countries that have contributed most players to Paraguayan football. Argentine football players, such as Roberto Acuña and Ricardo Ismael Rojas, played in for several years in Paraguay's leagues and even naturalized themselves to play for the national team. Argentine Héctor Núñez, Uruguayan Hernan Rodrigo Lopez and Brazilian Gauchinho are the only non-Paraguayan football players to be leading goalscorers of the Primera División Paraguaya in a single season, including the Apertura and Clausura. Héctor Núñez is the only foreign player to win the goalscoring title back-to-back (1994–1995), playing for Cerro Porteño. A Top 10 table follows.

Nationality	Player	Seasons	Period
Argentina	Sergio Escalante	13	2009–
Uruguay	Hernan Rodrigo Lopez	12	2002–2004; 2005–2007; 2012–2017
Colombia	Vladimir Marin	11	2007–2010; 2011–2012; 2016–2019; 2021–
Argentina	Alfredo Virginio Cano	11	2007–2017
Uruguay	Juan Manuel Salgueiro	10	2012–2013; 2014–2016; 2017–
Uruguay	Diego Ciz	10	2007–2010; 2011–2016
Argentina	Fabian Caballero	10	1997–1998; 1999–2000; 2005–2006; 2010; 2012; 2012–2014
Argentina	Guido Di Vanni	9	2012–2014; 2014–2016; 2016–2019; 2020
Argentina	Dario Ocampo	9	2011–2019

==== Non-CONMEBOL foreign football players ====
Most non-CONMEBOL or non-South American foreign football players in Paraguay's football leagues have come from African (CAF) countries, especially Cameroon, and from Asian (AFC) countries, especially Japan. Amongst the non-CONMEBOL foreign football players in Paraguay, the most iconic signing in Paraguayan football and the highest paid player in the country's history was the Togolese Emmanuel Adebayor, when he joined Olimpia Asunción in 2020. Between 2008 and 2011, 30 under-15 footballers from Indonesia, including Zikri Akbar and Rahmanuddin played at diverse clubs in Paraguay's Football League. In 2016, Trinidad and Tobago women's national team players Kennya Cordner and Kimika Forbes became the first CONCACAF players in to win a trophy in the CONMEBOL, being crowned champions of the Copa Libertadores Femenina with Paraguayan club Sportivo Limpeño. A Top 10 table follows.

Nationality	Player	Seasons	Period
United States of America	Bryan Lopez	8	2007–2014
Japan	Riki Kitawaki	8	2005–2012
Cameroon	Kenneth Nkweta Nju	7	2000–2005; 2007–2008
Cameroon	Tobie Mimboe	6	1993–1996; 2002; 2004
Cameroon	Arsenne Maffo	5	2010–2014
Australia	Victor Cristaldo	5	1993–1997
South Korea	Hee-Mang Jang	4	2017–2020
Japan	Takuma Sugano	4	2002–2005
Cameroon	Celestine Romed Ngah Kebe	3	2006–2008

=== Youngest debutants ===
A Top 5 list follows of the youngest players to debut in Paraguayan football.

Nationality	Player	Age	Date
Paraguay	Kevin Pereira	14 years 7 months 21 days	5 September 2018
Paraguay	Fernando Ovelar	14 years 9 months 22 days	28 October 2018
Paraguay	Pedro Benítez	15 years 1 day	24 March 1996
Paraguay	Ariel Galeano	15 years 19 days	10 September 2016
Paraguay	Jesus Medina	15 years 2 months 7 days	7 July 2012

=== Youngest goal scorers ===
An incomplete list follows of the youngest goal scoring players in Paraguayan football.

Nationality	Player	Age	Date
Paraguay	Fernando Ovelar	14 years 9 months 22 days	28 October 2018

=== Highest goal scorers ===
An incomplete list follows of the highest goal scoring players in Paraguayan football.

Nationality	Player	Goals
Paraguay	Santiago Salcedo	152
Uruguay	Hernan Rodrigo Lopez	127
Paraguay	Juan Eduardo Samudio	119
Paraguay	Fredy Bareiro	112

=== Highest paid players ===
An incomplete list follows of the highest paid players in Paraguayan football. Togolese Emmanuel Adebayor became the highest paid player in the history of Paraguayan football when he joined Olimpia Asunción in 2020.

Nationality	Player	Season	Salary per month
Togo	Emmanuel Adebayor	2020	USD125,000.00 (rounding off)

=== Highest transfer ===
Since 1999, Roque Santa Cruz held the highest transfer fee from Olimpia Asunción to Bayern Munich for USD6, 900, 000.00 before Juan Escobar was sold from Cerro Porteño to Mexican team Cruz Azul for USD7,000,000.00 in 2019. In January 2022, Julio Enciso was sold to FA Premier League team Brighton & Hove Albion from Libertad for US$9, 500, 000.00, a new record of highest transfer in Paraguayan football.

Nationality	Player	Season	Moving from	Moving to	Fee
Paraguay	Julio Enciso	2022	Libertad	(England) Brighton & Hove Albion	USD9,600,000.00

== Clubs ==
Mostly, football clubs in Paraguay count with the structure of several categories for all ages.

Categories for over-age players follow:

- First teams
- Substitutes
- Reserve teams

Categories for under-age players follow:

- Under-20 teams
- Under-19 teams
- Under-18 teams
- Under-17 teams
- Under-16 teams
- Under-15 teams
- Formation Football Schools

== Stadiums ==
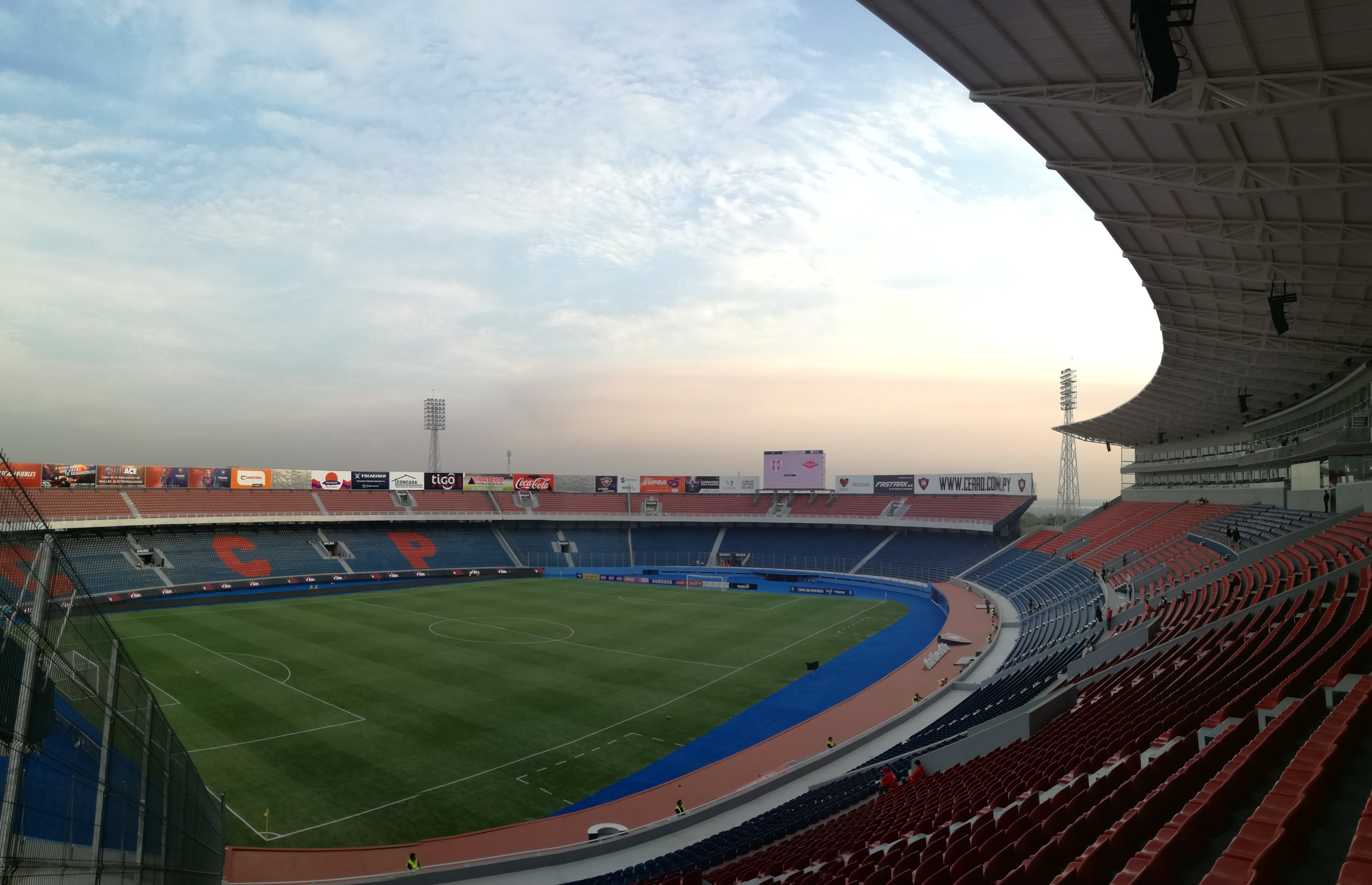
Cerro Porteño's Estadio General Pablo Rojas is Paraguay's most increased stadium in capacity

The country's most important stadiums are:

- Estadio Defensores del Chaco
- Estadio General Pablo Rojas
- Estadio Feliciano Caceres
- Estadio Río Parapití
- Estadio Antonio Aranda

The mentioned were venues for the 1999 Copa América. The Estadio Defensores del Chaco has more than 100 years as a stadium, and it is one of the places with most history in Paraguayan football. In 2015, the Estadio General Pablo Rojas which belongs to Club Cerro Porteño, began undergoing expansion and remodeling to become the most increased stadium in the country with a 51, 237 capacity.

Other stadiums include:

- Estadio Manuel Ferreira
- Estadio Dr. Nicolás Leoz

The mentioned stadiums are venues of the Primera Division Paraguaya and have seating.

== Attendances ==
The average attendance per top-flight football league season and the club with the highest average attendance:

Season	League average	Best club	Best club average
2019 Apertura	3,371	Cerro Porteño	15,753

== See also ==
- Paraguayan football league system
- Primera División Paraguaya
- División Intermedia
- Paraguayan Tercera División
- Paraguayan Primera División B
- Primera División B Nacional
- Paraguayan Cuarta División
- Campeonato Nacional de Interligas
- Unión del Fútbol del Interior
- Paraguayan women's football championship
- Football Federation of the 1st Department Concepción
- Football Federation of the 2nd Department San Pedro
- Football Federation of the 3rd Department Cordillera
- Football Federation of the 4th Department Guairá
- Football Federation of the 5th Department Caaguazú
- Football Federation of the 6th Department Caazapá
