= César Ramírez (footballer) =

Paraguayan politician and footballer (born 1977)

National Secretary of Sports
- Incumbent
- Assumed office 16 August 2023
- President: Santiago Peña
- Preceded by: Diego Galeano

Governor of Canindeyú
- In office 15 August 2018 – 15 August 2023

Personal details
- Born: 24 March 1977 (age 49) Curuguaty, Paraguay
- Party: Colorado
Association football career
- Height: 1.80 m (5 ft 11 in)
- Position: Forward
Youth career
- 1993–1994: Dock Sud
Senior career*
Years	Team	Apps	(Gls)
1995–1996	Cerro Corá	17	(0)
1997–1998	Sporting CP	29	(2)
1999	Vélez Sarsfield	16	(1)
1999–2005	Cerro Porteño	79	(26)
2005–2006	Flamengo	16	(5)
2007–2010	Cerro Porteño	76	(16)
Total		233	(50)
International career
1997–2006	Paraguay	17	(0)
- * Club domestic league appearances and goals

César Ramírez Caje (born 24 March 1977), nicknamed El Tigre (Tiger), is a Paraguayan politician and retired footballer who played as a forward.

He spent most of his professional career with Cerro Porteño (two spells, nine seasons in total), but also competed in Argentina and Portugal.

A Paraguayan international for nine years, Ramírez represented the nation at the 1998 World Cup.

In 2018, Ramírez was elected governor of the Paraguayan department of Canindeyú as the candidate of the Colorado Party. Since 2023, he is serving as Paraguay's National Secretary of Sports.

== Club career ==
Born in Curuguaty, Ramírez made his Paraguayan Primera División on 24 June 1995 at the age of 18, featuring for Club Cerro Corá in a 0–0 draw against Club Olimpia. In January 1997 he moved abroad for the first time, going on to spend two 1/2-seasons with Sporting Clube de Portugal, for whom he rarely played.

In 1999, following a spell in Argentina with Club Atlético Vélez Sársfield, Ramírez signed with Cerro Porteño back in his homeland, scoring seven goals in 22 games in the 2001 national championship to help his team lift the trophy. He bettered that to a career-high 13 goals three years later, with the tournament also ending in conquest.

Ramírez joined Brazil's Clube de Regatas do Flamengo in 2005, netting 11 times in 32 matches all competitions comprised during his one-year spell and ranking tenth-alltime foreign top scorer at the time of his retirement. Subsequently, he returned to Cerro for a further four top level campaigns, calling it quits at 33.

== International career ==
Ramírez made his debut for the Paraguay national team in 1997. He was selected by manager Paulo César Carpegiani for his 1998 FIFA World Cup squad, and appeared in two group stage contests in France, against Bulgaria and Spain (both 0–0 draws).

Additionally, Ramírez played six World Cup qualifiers during his international tenure.

== Honours ==
=== Club ===
Flamengo

- Brazilian Cup: 2006

Cerro Porteño

- Paraguayan League: 2001, 2004, Apertura 2009
