= 2001 in Paraguayan football =

The following article presents a summary of the 2001 football in Paraguay.

== First division results ==
=== Torneo Apertura ===
The Apertura tournament was played in a single all-play-all system. At the end, the top eight teams qualified to a playoff stage to determine the Apertura champion.

Position	Team	Played	Wins	Draws	Losses	Scored	Conceded	Points
1	Libertad	9	6	2	1	16	8	20
2	Sportivo Luqueño	9	6	1	2	26	14	19
3	Olimpia	9	5	3	1	21	15	18
4	Guaraní	9	5	3	1	14	9	18
5	Cerro Porteño	9	3	3	3	17	13	12
6	Sol de América	9	2	4	3	14	18	10
7	Cerro Corá	9	2	3	4	13	17	9
8	Atl. Colegiales	9	2	2	5	9	17	8
9	San Lorenzo	9	1	2	6	13	23	5
10	12 de Octubre	9	0	3	6	11	20	3

==== Apertura playoff stage ====
The top eight teams qualified to this stage.

===== Quarterfinals =====
Team 1	Agg.	Team 2	1st leg	2nd leg
Atl. Colegiales	2-2*	Libertad	1-1	1-1
Sol de América	1-3	Olimpia	1-2	0-1
Guaraní	2-3	Cerro Porteño	0-2	2-1
Cerro Corá	3-5	Sportivo Luqueño	0-1	3-4

*Libertad advances to next round due to better position in the Apertura table.

===== Semifinals =====
Team 1	Agg.	Team 2	1st leg	2nd leg
Cerro Porteño	3-1	Libertad	1-0	2-1
Sportivo Luqueño	2-0	Olimpia	0-0	2-0

===== Apertura final =====
Team 1	Agg.	Team 2	1st leg	2nd leg
Cerro Porteño	6-1	Sportivo Luqueño	3-0	3-1

Cerro Porteño wins the Apertura tournament final by an aggregate score of 6-1 on June 24, 2001.

=== Torneo Clausura ===
The Clausura tournament was played in a single all-play-all system. At the end, the top eight teams qualified to a playoff stage to determine the Clausura champion.

Position	Team	Played	Wins	Draws	Losses	Scored	Conceded	Points
1	Cerro Porteño	9	5	2	2	14	7	17
2	Libertad	9	4	4	1	12	4	16
3	12 de Octubre	9	5	1	3	15	10	16
4	Cerro Corá	9	4	2	3	15	14	14
5	San Lorenzo	9	4	1	4	11	11	13
6	Sportivo Luqueño	9	3	4	2	11	12	13
7	Guaraní	9	3	1	5	6	9	10
8	Sol de América	9	2	3	4	11	16	9
9	Atl. Colegiales	9	2	3	4	6	11	9
10	Olimpia	9	2	1	6	6	13	7

==== Clausura playoff stage ====
The top eight teams qualified to this stage with the exception of Cerro Corá, who was replaced by Olimpia because Cerro Corá was already relegated to the second division based on a three-year average point table.

===== Quarterfinals =====
Team 1	Agg.	Team 2	1st leg	2nd leg
Guaraní	4-3	12 de Octubre	2-3	2-0
Sol de América	2-2*	Libertad	0-1	2-1
Olimpia	0-4	Cerro Porteño	0-3	0-1
San Lorenzo	1-0	Sportivo Luqueño	1-0	0-0

*Libertad advances to next round due to better position in the Apertura table.

===== Semifinals =====
Team 1	Agg.	Team 2	1st leg	2nd leg
Cerro Porteño	4-2	San Lorenzo	1-2	3-0
Libertad	1-4	Guaraní	1-1	0-3

===== Clausura final =====
Team 1	Agg.	Team 2	1st leg	2nd leg
Cerro Porteño	4-4 (7 - 6 pen)	Guaraní	3-4	1-0

Cerro Porteño wins the Clausura tournament final in a penalty shootout.

=== Championship game playoff ===
Since Cerro Porteño won both the Apertura and Clausura tournaments they were declared as the national champions and no playoff game was played.

=== Relegation / Promotion ===
- Cerro Corá automatically relegated to the second division after finishing last in the average points table based over a three-year period.

Atl. Colegiales finished second-to-last in the aggregate points table, so had to participate in the promotion play-off game against second division runners-up Club Sport Colombia. Sport Colombia won the playoff game by an aggregate score of 5-1, so Colegiales was relegated to the second division.

- Deportivo Recoleta promoted to the first division by winning the second division tournament.

=== Qualification to international competitions ===
- Cerro Porteño qualified to the 2002 Copa Libertadores by winning the Torneo Apertura and Torneo Clausura.
- The remaining two spots for Copa Libertadores were decided in the Pre-Libertadores playoff tournament.

==== Pre-Libertadores playoff ====
Six teams participated based on aggregate points during the year. Sportivo Luqueño entered the playoff with three bonus points by winning the runners-up game against Guarani.

Position	Team	Played	Wins	Draws	Losses	Scored	Conceded	Bonus Points	Points
1	12 de Octubre	5	3	1	1	10	4	[0]	10
2	Olimpia	5	3	1	1	8	5	[0]	10
3	Libertad	5	2	1	2	11	11	[0]	7
4	Guaraní	5	2	1	2	4	5	[0]	7
5	Sportivo Luqueño	5	1	1	3	7	13	[3]	7
6	Sol de America	5	1	1	3	8	10	[0]	4

- Olimpia and 12 de Octubre qualify to the 2002 Copa Libertadores.

== Lower divisions results ==
Level	Tournament	Champion
2nd	Intermedia	Recoleta
3rd (G.A. teams)	Primera de Ascenso	Club Independiente (Campo Grande)
3rd (interior teams)	UFI Champions Cup	Itá Ybaté (Villeta)
4th (G.A. teams)	Segunda de Ascenso	Humaitá

== Paraguayan teams in international competitions ==
- 2001 Copa Libertadores:
  - Cerro Porteño: round of 16
  - Olimpia: group stage
  - Guaraní: group stage
- Copa MERCOSUR 2001:
  - Cerro Porteño: quarterfinals
  - Olimpia: group stage

== Paraguay national team ==
Date	Venue	Opponents	Score	Comp	Paraguay scorers	Report
2001-01-27	Hong Kong Stadium; Hong Kong	South Korea	1 - 1	F	Morinigo 68'	N/A
March 28, 2001	Estadio Centenario; Montevideo	Uruguay	0 - 1	WCQ 2002	Alvarenga 64'	Report
April 24, 2001	Estadio Olímpico Atahualpa; Quito	Ecuador	2 - 1	WCQ 2002	Cardozo 26'	Report
June 2, 2001	Estadio Defensores del Chaco; Asunción	Chile	1 - 0	WCQ 2002	Paredes 90'	Report
2001-06-28	National Stadium; Tokyo, Japan	FR Yugoslavia	0 - 2	Kirin Cup	Caceres 39'; Ferreira 83'	N/A
2001-07-01	Sapporo Dome; Sapporo, Japan	Japan	2 - 0	Kirin Cup		N/A
July 12, 2001	Estadio Pascual Guerrero; Cali	Peru	3 - 3	CA2001	Ferreira 23', 64'; Garay 90'	N/A
July 15, 2001	Estadio Pascual Guerrero; Cali	Mexico	0 - 0	CA2001	-	N/A
July 18, 2001	Estadio Pascual Guerrero; Cali	Brazil	3 - 1	CA2001	Alvarenga 11'	N/A
August 15, 2001	Beira Rio; Porto Alegre	Brazil	2 - 0	WCQ 2002	-	Report
September 15, 2001	Estadio Defensores del Chaco; Asunción	Bolivia	5 - 1	WCQ 2002	Paredes 33'; Cardozo 45', 89'; Chilavert 50'; Santa Cruz 69'	Report
October 7, 2001	Estadio Defensores del Chaco; Asunción	Argentina	2 - 2	WCQ 2002	Chilavert 51'; Morinigo 70'	Report
November 8, 2001	Estadio Polideportivo de Pueblo Nuevo; San Cristóbal	Venezuela	3 - 1	WCQ 2002	Arce 28'	Report
November 14, 2001	Estadio Defensores del Chaco; Asunción	Colombia	0 - 4	WCQ 2002	-	Report
