= Francisco Álvarez =

Francisco Álvarez may refer to:

== Arts and Entertainment ==
- Francisco Álvarez (actor) (1892–1960), Argentine actor
- Francisco C. Álvarez (1903–1963), Filipino actor and playwright

== Politics ==
- Francisco Álvares (c. 1465–1536/41), Portuguese missionary and explorer
- Francisco Álvarez-Cascos (born 1947), Spanish civil engineer and politician

== Sportspeople ==
- Francisco Álvarez (beach volleyball) (born 1969), Cuban beach volleyball player
- Francisco Álvarez (footballer, born 1982), Salvadoran footballer
- Francisco Álvarez (footballer, born 2000), Argentine defender for San Martín de San Juan
- Francisco Álvarez (baseball) (born 2001), Venezuelan baseball player

== Other uses ==
- Francisco Álvarez Martínez (1925–2022), cardinal in the Roman Catholic Church
- General Francisco Álvarez, a town in the Canendiyú department of Paraguay
