= 2003 in Paraguayan football =

The following article presents a summary of the 2003 football (soccer) season in Paraguay.

== First division results ==
=== Torneo Apertura ===
The Apertura tournament was played in a single all-play-all system. At the end, the top six teams qualified to a playoff stage to determine the Apertura champion.

Position	Team	Played	Wins	Draws	Losses	Scored	Conceded	Points
1	Libertad	9	6	3	0	13	3	21
2	Cerro Porteño	9	5	3	1	20	8	18
3	Olimpia	9	4	4	1	16	11	16
4	Sol de América	9	3	4	2	12	7	13
5	Tacuary	9	4	1	4	15	16	13
6	Guaraní	9	3	3	3	18	20	12
7	Sportivo Luqueño	9	3	2	4	14	12	11
8	Sport Colombia	9	2	2	5	14	20	8
9	12 de Octubre	9	1	4	4	8	18	7
10	San Lorenzo	9	1	0	8	10	25	3

==== Apertura playoff stage ====
The top six teams qualified to this stage and were divided into two groups. The top two teams in the Apertura points table (Libertad and Cerro Porteño) were given two bonus points to start the group stage.

===== Group stage =====
Teams qualified to the Final

- Group A

Position	Team	Played	Wins	Draws	Losses	Scored	Conceded	Bonus Points	Points
1	Libertad	2	1	1	0	2	0	[2]	6
2	Tacuary	2	1	1	0	2	0	[0]	4
3	Olimpia	2	0	0	2	0	4	[0]	0

- Group B

Position	Team	Played	Wins	Draws	Losses	Scored	Conceded	Bonus Points	Points
1	Guaraní	2	2	0	0	3	1	[0]	6
2	Sol de América	2	1	0	1	4	3	[0]	3
3	Cerro Porteño	2	0	0	2	3	6	[2]	2

===== Apertura Final =====
May 18, 2003

Guaraní	0–0	Libertad

December 14, 2007

Libertad	1–0	Guaraní

Libertad wins the Apertura tournament final by an aggregate score of 1-0.

=== Torneo Clausura ===
The Clausura tournament was played in a two-round all-play-all system, with the champion being the team with the most points at the end of the two rounds.

Position	Team	Played	Wins	Draws	Losses	Scored	Conceded	Points
1	Libertad*	18	9	6	3	32	20	33
2	Olimpia	18	9	6	3	30	18	33
3	Cerro Porteño	18	9	5	4	24	15	32
4	Guaraní	18	7	6	5	24	17	27
5	Sportivo Luqueño	18	7	6	5	21	20	27
6	Sol de América	18	4	7	7	17	16	19
7	12 de Octubre	18	4	7	7	7	14	19
8	San Lorenzo	18	4	6	8	18	32	18
9	Tacuary	18	4	5	9	20	29	17
10	Sport Colombia	18	4	4	10	22	29	16

*Since Olimpia and Libertad tied in points and goal difference at the end of the Clausura, a championship game playoff was played on November 30, with Libertad winning 6-5 in penalties after a 0-0 tie in regulation.

=== Championship game playoff ===
Since Libertad won both the Apertura and Clausura tournaments they were declared as the national champions and no playoff game was played.

==== Runners-up game playoff ====
Two games were played to determine the 2003 championship runners-up between Olimpia and Guaraní, who finished in second place in the Clausura and Apertura respectively. The winner of this playoff was guaranteed a spot in the 2003 Copa Libertadores.

November 2, 2003

Olimpia	1–1	Guaraní

November 5, 2003

Guaraní	3–2	Olimpia

Guaraní runners-up of the 2003 first division tournament by winning on an aggregate score of 4-3.

=== Relegation / Promotion ===
- San Lorenzo automatically relegated to the second division after finishing last in the average points table based over a three-year period.

Tacuary finished second-to-last in the aggregate points table, so had to participate in the promotion play-off game against second division runners-up 3 de Febrero. Tacuary won the playoff game by an aggregate score of 4-2, so it remains in the first division.

- Club Nacional promoted to the first division by winning the second division tournament.

=== Qualification to international competitions ===
- Libertad qualified to the 2004 Copa Libertadores by winning the Torneo Apertura and Torneo Clausura.
- Guaraní qualified to the 2004 Copa Libertadores by finishing as runners-up of the 2003 season.
- A four team playoff was played to determine the 3rd participant in the 2004 Copa Libertadores. Olimpia entered the playoff with one bonus point because it finished second in the Clausura tournament.

==== Pre-Libertadores playoff ====
Position	Team	Played	Wins	Draws	Losses	Scored	Conceded	Bonus Points	Points
1	Olimpia	3	2	1	0	4	1	[1]	8
2	Sportivo Luqueño	3	2	0	1	8	4	[0]	6
3	Cerro Porteño	3	1	0	2	4	7	[0]	3
4	Sol de America	3	0	1	2	5	9	[0]	1

- Olimpia qualifies to the 2004 Copa Libertadores by winning the Pre-Libertadores tournament.

== Lower divisions results ==
Level	Tournament	Champion
2nd	Intermedia	Nacional
3rd (G.A. teams)	Primera de Ascenso	Fernando de la Mora
3rd (interior teams)	UFI Champions Cup	Club 2 de Mayo (Pedro Juan Caballero)
4th (G.A. teams)	Segunda de Ascenso	Sportivo Ameliano

== Paraguayan teams in international competitions ==
- Copa Libertadores 2003:
  - Olimpia: round of 16
  - Cerro Porteño: round of 16
  - Libertad: group-stage
  - 12 de Octubre: group-stage
- Recopa Sudamericana 2003:
  - Olimpia: Champions
- Copa Sudamericana 2003:
  - Libertad: quarterfinals
  - Guaraní: preliminary first round

== Paraguay national team ==
The following table lists all the games played by the Paraguay national football team in official competitions during 2003.

Date	Venue	Opponents	Score	Comp	Paraguay scorers	Report
September 6, 2003	Estadio Nacional; Lima, Peru	Peru	4 - 1	WCQ 2006	Gamarra 24'	Report
September 10, 2003	Defensores del Chaco; Asunción, Paraguay	Uruguay	4 - 1	WCQ 2006	Cardozo 26', 58', 72'; Paredes 53'	Report
November 15, 2003	Defensores del Chaco; Asunción, Paraguay	Ecuador	2 - 1	WCQ 2006	Santa Cruz 29'; Cardozo 75'	Report
November 18, 2003	Estadio Nacional; Santiago, Chile	Chile	0 - 1	WCQ 2006	Paredes 30'	Report
