= 2004 in Paraguayan football =

The following article presents a summary of the 2004 football (soccer) season in Paraguay.

== First division results ==
The first division tournament was divided in two sections: the Apertura and the Clausura and had 10 teams participating in a two round all-play-all system. The team with the most points at the end of the two rounds was crowned as the champion.

=== Torneo Apertura ===
Position	Team	Played	Wins	Draws	Losses	Scored	Conceded	Points
1	Cerro Porteño	18	12	5	1	31	13	41
2	Libertad	18	11	5	2	44	13	38
3	Tacuary	18	8	4	6	25	13	28
4	Guaraní	18	8	4	6	20	25	28
5	Olimpia	18	6	5	7	21	28	23
6	Nacional	18	5	5	8	19	24	20
7	Sol de América	18	5	4	9	14	24	19
8	12 de Octubre	18	5	3	10	18	28	18
9	Sportivo Luqueño	18	3	8	7	19	30	17
10	Sport Colombia	18	4	3	11	21	34	15

=== Torneo Clausura ===
Position	Team	Played	Wins	Draws	Losses	Scored	Conceded	Points
1	Cerro Porteño	18	12	2	4	30	13	38
2	Libertad	18	9	4	5	27	22	31
3	Nacional	18	7	6	5	29	24	27
4	Tacuary	18	4	12	2	15	14	24
5	Guaraní	18	5	8	5	21	29	23
6	Sport Colombia	18	5	6	7	22	24	21
7	Sol de América	18	5	5	8	25	27	20
8	Sportivo Luqueño	18	4	8	6	23	29	20
9	12 de Octubre	18	3	9	6	19	22	18
10	Olimpia	18	4	4	10	22	29	16

=== Championship game playoff ===
Since Cerro Porteño won both the Apertura and Clausura tournaments they were declared as the national champions and there was no playoff game as a result.

=== Relegation / Promotion ===
- Sport Colombia and Sol de América automatically relegated to the second division after finishing last and second-to-last in the average points table over a three-year period.
- 3 de Febrero and General Caballero ZC promoted to the first division by finishing first and second respectively in the second division tournament.

=== Qualification to international competitions ===
- Cerro Porteño qualified to the 2005 Copa Libertadores by winning the Torneo Apertura and Torneo Clausura; and to the 2004 Copa Sudamericana by winning the 2004 Copa Sudamericana Qualifier.
- Libertad qualified to the 2005 Copa Libertadores by finishing second in the aggregate points table, and to the 2004 Copa Sudamericana by finishing in second place in the Torneo Apertura.
- Tacuary qualified to the 2005 Copa Libertadores as the second-best finisher in the aggregate points table.

== Lower divisions results ==
Level	Tournament	Champion
2nd	Intermedia	3 de Febrero
3rd (G.A. teams)	Primera de Ascenso	Silvio Pettirossi
3rd (interior teams)	UFI Champions Cup	Club Ciudad Nueva (Ciudad del Este)
4th (G.A. teams)	Segunda de Ascenso	Club 3 de Noviembre

== Paraguayan teams in international competitions ==
- Copa Libertadores 2004:
  - Olimpia: group-stage
  - Libertad: group-stage
  - Club Guaraní: group-stage
- Copa Sudamericana 2004:
  - Cerro Porteño: quarter-finals
  - Libertad: preliminary first round

== Paraguay national team ==
The following table lists all the games played by the Paraguay national football team in official competitions during 2004.

Date	Venue	Opponents	Score	Comp	Paraguay scorers	Report
March 31, 2004	Defensores del Chaco; Asunción, Paraguay	Brazil	0 - 0	WCQ 2006	-	Report
June 1, 2004	Estadio Hernando Siles; La Paz, Bolivia	Bolivia	2 - 1	WCQ 2006	Cardozo 33'	Report
June 6, 2004	Monumental de Núñez; Buenos Aires, Argentina	Argentina	0 - 0	WCQ 2006	-	Report
July 8, 2004	Estadio UNSA; Arequipa, Peru	Costa Rica	0 - 1	Copa America 2004	Dos Santos 85' (pen.)	N/A
July 11, 2004	Estadio UNSA; Arequipa, Peru	Chile	1 - 1	Copa America 2004	Cristaldo 78'	N/A
July 14, 2004	Estadio UNSA; Arequipa, Peru	Brazil	1 - 2	Copa America 2004	J.V. González 29'; Bareiro 71'	N/A
July 18, 2004	Estadio Jorge Basadre; Tacna, Peru	Uruguay	1 - 3	Copa America 2004	Gamarra 15'	N/A
August 12, 2004	Kaftanzoglio Stadium; Thessaloniki, Greece	Japan	4 - 3	2004 Olympic Games	Giménez 5'; Cardozo 26', 37'; Torres 62'	Report
August 15, 2004	Kaftanzoglio Stadium; Thessaloniki, Greece	Ghana	1 - 2	2004 Olympic Games	Gamarra 76'	Report
August 18, 2004	Karaiskaki Stadium; Athens, Greece	Italy	1 - 0	2004 Olympic Games	Bareiro 14'	Report
August 21, 2004	Kaftanzoglio Stadium; Thessaloniki, Greece	South Korea	3 - 2	2004 Olympic Games	Bareiro 19', 71'; Cardozo 61'	Report
August 24, 2004	Kaftanzoglio Stadium; Thessaloniki, Greece	Iraq	1 - 3	2004 Olympic Games	Cardozo 17', 34'; Bareiro 68'	Report
August 28, 2004	Olympic Stadium; Athens, Greece	Argentina	1 - 0	2004 Olympic Games	-	Report
September 5, 2004	Defensores del Chaco; Asunción, Paraguay	Venezuela	1 - 0	WCQ 2006	Gamarra 52'	Report
October 9, 2004	Metropolitano Roberto Melendez; Barranquilla, Colombia	Colombia	1 - 1	WCQ 2006	Torres 78'	Report
October 13, 2004	Defensores del Chaco; Asunción, Paraguay	Peru	1 - 1	WCQ 2006	Paredes 13'	Report
November 17, 2004	Estadio Centenario; Montevideo, Uruguay	Uruguay	1 - 0	WCQ 2006	-	Report
