= Paraguayan Tercera División =

Association football league

The Tercera División de Paraguay (Third Division of Paraguay, in English), is the third division of Paraguayan football. It is organized by the Paraguayan Football Association in the Asunción metropolitan area, and by the Unión del Fútbol del Interior in the rest of the country. The winners, and sometimes runners-up of each tournaments are promoted to División Intermedia, the second-tier in the Paraguayan football league system.

The Paraguayan Third Division is divided into three leagues:

- The Primera División B Metropolitana (disputed by clubs within Asunción Metropolitan Area).
- The Primera División B Nacional (disputed by clubs from outside Asunción Metropolitan Area).
- The Campeonato Nacional de Interligas (disputed by representative teams of each of the 17 departments of Paraguay with the exception of the Capital District and the Central Department, both part of Asunción Metropolitan Area).

== Leagues ==
=== Primera División B Metropolitana ===
The Primera B Metropolitana is the metropolitan tournament of the Paraguayan third-tier division. Only teams from the Gran Asunción area a take part in this third division league. It is being played since 1939 and, as of 2023, the number of teams is 17.

=== Primera División B Nacional ===
The Primera B Nacional tournament is being played since 2011. Teams from the all departments of Paraguay (except Asunción and Central department) take part in this third division league. Since 2014, in even years the champion does not earn direct promotion, but gets the chance to play a repechage against the runner-up of the Primera División B, in odd years the champion is directly promoted and the runner-up is the one who wins the right to play the repechage.

=== Campeonato Nacional de Interligas ===
The Campeonato Nacional de Interligas is the biggest football event involving teams with combined players from different clubs of every regional leagues in Paraguay from all departments. The tournament is organized by UFI.

== List of last champions ==
Last Tercera División champions
League	Primera B Metropolitana	Primera B Nacional	Campeonato de Interligas
Club	Deportivo Recoleta	Sportivo Carapeguá	Encarnación
Season	2022	2022	2022-23
Result	Promoted to the 2023 División Intermedia		Promoted to the 2024 División Intermedia

== See also ==
- Football in Paraguay
- Paraguayan football league system
- Primera División Paraguaya
- División Intermedia
- Paraguayan Cuarta División
- Unión del Fútbol del Interior
- Paraguayan women's football championship
- Football Federation of the 1st Department Concepción
- Football Federation of the 2nd Department San Pedro
- Football Federation of the 3rd Department Cordillera
- Football Federation of the 4th Department Guairá
- Football Federation of the 5th Department Caaguazú
- Football Federation of the 6th Department Caazapá
- Football Federation of the 7th Department Itapúa
- Football Federation of the 8th Department Misiones
- Football Federation of the 9th Department Paraguarí
- Football Federation of the 10th Department Alto Paraná
- Football Federation of the 11th Department Central
- Football Federation of the 12th Department Ñeembucú
- Football Federation of the 13th Department Amambay
- Football Federation of the 14th Department Canindeyú
- Football Federation of the 15th Department Presidente Hayes
- Football Federation of the 16th Department Alto Paraguay
- Football Federation of the 17th Department Boquerón
