= Curuguaty =

Curuguaty Kuruguaty Villa San Isidro Labrador de los Reyes Católicos de Curuguaty
- City and district
- Location in Paraguay
- Coordinates: 24°28′48″S 55°42′36″W
- Country: Paraguay
- Department: Canindeyú
- Founded: May 15, 1712, by Juan Gregorio de Bazán y Pedraza

Government
  - Intendente Municipal: Abg Hugo Valdés Mujica (ANR) ((ANR))

Area
  - Total: 3,650 km^{2} (1,410 sq mi)
- Elevation: 178 m (584 ft)

Population (2019)
  - Total: 56,634
  - Density: 15.51/km^{2} (40.2/sq mi)
- Time zone: UTC-4
- Postal code: 7930
- Area code: (595) (48)

Curuguaty (Spanish pronunciation: [kuɾuɣwaˈti], originally called Villa de San Isidro Labrador de los Reyes Católicos de Curuguaty; Guarani: Kuruguaty) is a city and a district in the Canindeyú Department of Paraguay, that was the 4th and last capital of Paraguay during the Paraguayan War in 1869–1870.

== Toponymy ==
The meaning of the word Kuruguaty is “place of the Curugua”, curugua (Latin: Cucurbita odorifera) being a plant very common in the area.

== Geography ==
Canindeyú Department has a richness in flora and is surrounded by the Mbaracayú Mountains, which have an average altitude of 400 meters above ocean level. It is possible, in this place, to appreciate the biological diversity of the Atlantic Forest, Spanish: Mata atlántica.

=== Climate ===
In summer, the temperature reaches 39 °C and in winter drops to 0 °C. The average in the entire department is 21 °C. The precipitations are very frequent and abundant.

== Demographics ==
According to the projections of the Statistics, Polls and Census General Direction, the city has a population of 65,310 inhabitants, of which 34,137 are men and 31,172 are women. A great number of the inhabitants are originating from neighbouring Brazil.

== History ==
Curuguaty was found on May 15, 1712, by Juan Gregorio de Bazán y Pedraza, with the name of “Villa de San Isidro Labrador de los Reyes Católicos de Curuguaty”, on the banks of the Curuguaty River.

In this city lived, during the government of Dr. Francia, the founder and first dictator of Paraguay, in his exile for over 30 years, José Gervasio Artigas, the liberator of Uruguay. During the War against the Triple Alliance, the Marshall López declared Curuguaty as his last and the 4th capital of Paraguay and the Vice-President Domingo Francisco Sánchez Corvalán settled in the place. López settled his troops near Curuguaty on the banks of the Itandey Stream, when he was going towards the Amambay Cordillera, where the last battles would be fought during the war.

Since the early years of the new millennium landless peasants fight for their land, which was in part at least given in the past decades to influential and wealthy men and women of the political upper classes of Paraguay. The last clashes occurred in June 2012 and cost the lives of at least eleven peasants and six policemen.

== Notable people ==
A martyr of the Paraguayan Independence, Mauricio José Troche, was a native of Curuguaty.

== How to get there ==
Curuguaty is located 240 kilometers from Asunción; the way of access is through Route No. III “Gral. Elizardo Aquino” and through Route No. X “Las Residentas”, which communicates the departments’ capital with Asunción. Also, the superhighway of Itaipu, communicates the city with Alto Paraná and Presidente Franco.

Reaching the city, an unpaved detour to the left leads to Villa Ygatimí, Ypehú, Itanará, and the Mbaracayú Forest National Reserve.
