= Atilio Cáceres =

Paraguayan football player (born 1981)

Personal information
- Full name: Atilio Asuncion Cáceres Báez
- Date of birth: 15 August 1981 (age 45)
- Place of birth: Eulogio Estigarribia, Caaguazú, Paraguay
- Position: Striker

Youth career
- 2000–2003: Tembetary

Senior career*
Years	Team	Apps	(Gls)
2003–2004	CS San Lorenzo		
2005	Cerro Porteño PF		(8)
2005–2006	Real Arroyo Seco	4	(0)
2007	DPMM FC	6	(2)
2008–2009	Deportivo Caaguazú		
2010–	CS Campo 9		
- * Club domestic league appearances and goals as of 6 May 2021

Atilio Asuncion Cáceres Báez (born 15 August 1981) is a Paraguayan footballer who plays as a striker.

== Career ==
Cáceres was a youth player at Club Atlético Tembetary and played alongside future Paraguay national team star Nelson Valdez. He furthered his development at Club Sportivo San Lorenzo and afterwards Cerro Porteño PF of the División Intermedia, the second level of the Paraguayan league system. He was then transferred to Real Arroyo Seco in neighbouring Argentina, playing in the Torneo Argentino B, the Argentinean third level.

Cáceres' next move was to Southeast Asia and specifically Brunei, where the only professional club in the country DPMM FC were riding high in the 2006–07 Malaysia Super League. He excelled in trials and was signed by the club in January 2007 along with Alejandro Tobar in the middle of the season, ending the loan stints of Viban Francis Bayong and Dan Ito who were excellent for them in such a short time. These high expectations proved too much for the two to shoulder, as coach Ranko Buketa immediately voiced his dissatisfaction of them in friendly games held days after they signed.

Cáceres made his Super League debut against Negeri Sembilan Naza on 14 February in a 5–1 victory, but suffered a knee injury during the game. His next match would be two weeks later which by then his club had already called up trialists to replace him. He scored his first goal for DPMM against Johor FC in a 3–1 win on 14 March, followed by the winner in a 4–3 victory against league leaders Perak at home on 1 April, ending the opposition's unbeaten streak. Nevertheless, despite scoring two goals in six games, Cáceres was released from his contract in the same month as he was still struggling from the knee injury and moreover he was unpopular with Brunei fans who often prefer workrate over target men strikers, who they deem lazy.

Little is known about Cáceres after his Bruneian adventure, except that he played for Deportivo Caaguazú in their promotion season in the 2009 División Intermedia, possibly being a founding squad member since the club's establishment the year prior. After leaving Deportivo, he moved to Club Sportiva Campo 9 in his local league in his native Eulogio Estigarribia, managing to represent his league in the 2015 Campeonato Nacional de Interligas.

== Personal life ==
Cáceres' elder brother Miguel Ángel is also a footballer who is capped at international level.
