= 2010 Barcelona Sporting Club season =

Ecuadorian football club season

Barcelona SC
2010 season
- President: Eduardo Maruri
- Manager: Rubén Darío Insúa
- Stadium: Estadio Monumental Banco Pichincha
- Serie A: 4th
- Copa Sudamericana: Second Stage
- Top goalscorer: League: Juan Samudio (13 goals); All: Juan Samudio (14 goals)

Barcelona Sporting Club's 2010 season was the club's 85th year of existence, and the 53rd in the top level of professional football in Ecuador. The club participated in their 52nd Campeonato Ecuatoriano de Fútbol, and their third Copa Sudamericana.

== Serie A ==
2010 will be Barcelona's 52nd season in the Serie A.

=== First stage ===
Overall								Home						Away					
Pld	W	D	L	GF	GA	GD	Pts	W	D	L	GF	GA	GD	W	D	L	GF	GA	GD
22	12	7	3	26	12	+14	43	8	1	2	17	6	+11	4	6	1	9	6	+3
