= Unión del Fútbol del Interior =

The Unión del Fútbol del Interior (English: Football Union of the Interior; UFI) is an association affiliated to the Paraguayan Football Association that was founded in 1927 to organize and govern football outside of Asunción, specifically on each of the different Departments of Paraguay.

The UFI is constituted by the clubs and leagues that are part of the Departmental Football Federation from each Department in Paraguay. Club tournaments organized by the UFI gives chances to teams from all over Paraguay to reach the first division by clearing lower division levels. For a more detailed information about the Paraguayan football league system see the main article. The UFI is also in charge of the Campeonato Nacional de Interligas.

As of 2006 the UFI has 1,652 clubs affiliated, from which four of them are currently playing in the Paraguayan second division and three in the first division.

== Federations ==
There are a total of 17 Federations linked to the UFI; one on each Department in Paraguay, with the purpose of organizing the different leagues and clubs affiliated to them.

Federation	Main office location
Football Federation of the 1st Department Concepción	Concepción
Football Federation of the 2nd Department San Pedro	San Pedro
Football Federation of the 3rd Department Cordillera	Caacupé
Football Federation of the 4th Department Guairá	Villarrica
Football Federation of the 5th Department Caaguazú	Coronel Oviedo
Football Federation of the 6th Department Caazapá	Caazapá
Football Federation of the 7th Department Itapúa	Encarnación
Football Federation of the 8th Department Misiones	San Juan Bautista
Football Federation of the 9th Department Paraguarí	Paraguarí
Football Federation of the 10th Department Alto Paraná	Yguazú
Football Federation of the 11th Department Central	Itauguá
Football Federation of the 12th Department Ñeembucú	Pilar
Football Federation of the 13th Department Amambay	Pedro Juan Caballero
Football Federation of the 14th Department Canindeyú	Puente Kyhá
Football Federation of the 15th Department Presidente Hayes	Villa Hayes
Football Federation of the 16th Department Alto Paraguay	Fuerte Olimpo
Football Federation of the 17th Department Boquerón	Filadelfia
