= Mauricio José Troche (liberator) =

Mauricio José Troche was one of the main liberators of Paraguay.

== Life ==
Mauricio José Troche was born in 1790 in San Isidro de Curuguaty in Paraguay. He played an important role in the Paraguayan revolution of 14 and May 15, 1811, which culminated in the independence of that country. He was the officer who delivered the main headquarters "La Plaza″. Mauricio Jose Troche signed on June 9 the manifest of dismissal of the Spanish governor Bernardo de Velazco. Troche enjoyed high prestige in Curuguaty. He also clashed with the commander Villalba, who charged him to the dictator of France of its enormous influence in the council of Curuguaty, so that the dictator ordered his transfer to Asunción. The villagers of Curuguaty demanded his restitution "for being the only man capable of advising the City council″. France did not comply with the order. Later, it is known that he moved away completely from political life, so he could survive his colleagues in the War of Independence of Paraguay. He fulfilled military and administrative functions for the government of France until he was tried and executed in the late 1830s.

== Geography ==
The District Capitán Mauricio José Troche of Paraguay is named after the liberator.
