= Juan Samudio =

Paraguayan footballer (born 1978)

Personal information
- Full name: Juan Eduardo Samudio Serna
- Date of birth: 14 October 1978 (age 48)
- Place of birth: Asunción, Paraguay
- Height: 1.79 m (5 ft 10 in)
- Position: Striker

Team information
- Current team: Libertad (youth manager)

Youth career
- Libertad

Senior career*
Years	Team	Apps	(Gls)
1996–1998	Libertad	27	(7)
1999	Guaraní	4	(0)
2000–2006	Libertad	141	(82)
2007	Querétaro	7	(0)
2007	Guaraní	19	(5)
2008–2009	Libertad	54	(26)
2009–2010	Barcelona S.C.	52	(21)
2011	Sportivo Luqueño	5	(0)
2012	Libertad	1	(0)

International career
2002–2005	Paraguay	10	(1)

Managerial career
- 2020–2026: Libertad (youth)
- 2020: Libertad (interim)
- 2026: Libertad
- 2026–: Libertad (youth)
- * Club domestic league appearances and goals

Juan Eduardo Samudio Serna (born 14 October 1978 in Asunción) is a Paraguayan football manager and former player who played as a striker. He is the current manager of Libertad's youth categories.

Samudio held the record for most goals scored in the Paraguayan first division with 108 goals, and is the third maximum goal scorer of Paraguayan football with 119 goals, ahead of Fredy Bareiro (112). He was nicknamed El Mágico (The Magician).

== Career ==
Samudio started his career in the youth divisions of Libertad and made his debut in 1996. While in Libertad the team got relegated to the 2nd division in 1998 but Samudio stayed in the team and helped in obtaining the promotion to 1st division in 2000. After the promotion, Libertad saw success in their return to first division and won two national championships back to back in 2002 and 2003 and was the topscorer of the Paraguayan league in 2002 and 2004.

In 2007, he had a brief stint in Mexico playing for Querétaro FC and returned to Paraguay to play for Guaraní before returning to Libertad to play and win the Apertura 2008 tournament. In July 2008 he was offered a symbolic "lifetime" contract by Libertad because of all his contributions to the team throughout the years. In September 2008 Samudio reached 108 goals in the Paraguayan first division, passing Mauro Caballero and becoming the all-time goalscorer of Paraguayan football.

== Honours ==
=== Titles ===
Season	Team	Title
2000	Libertad	Paraguayan 2nd Division
2002	Libertad	Paraguayan 1st Division
2003	Libertad	Paraguayan 1st Division
2006	Libertad	Paraguayan 1st Division
2008	Libertad	Apertura 2008
2008	Libertad	Clausura 2008

=== Individual ===
- Third maximum goal scorer of Paraguayan football with 119 goals
- Paraguayan 1st Division topscorer in 2002.
- Paraguayan 1st Division topscorer in 2004.

== See also ==
- Players and Records in Paraguayan Football
