= Katueté =

- Municipality
- Location within Paraguay
- Coordinates: 24°15′01.5″S 54°46′52.3″W
- Country: Paraguay
- Department: Canindeyú

Government
  - Mayor: Julio César Brítez

Area
  - Total: 588.8 km^{2} (227.3 sq mi)

Population (November 9, 2022)
  - Total: 10,774
  - Density: 18.3/km^{2} (47/sq mi)
- Time zone: UTC-03:00
- Postal code: 7920
- MCN: 1408
- Website: Official website

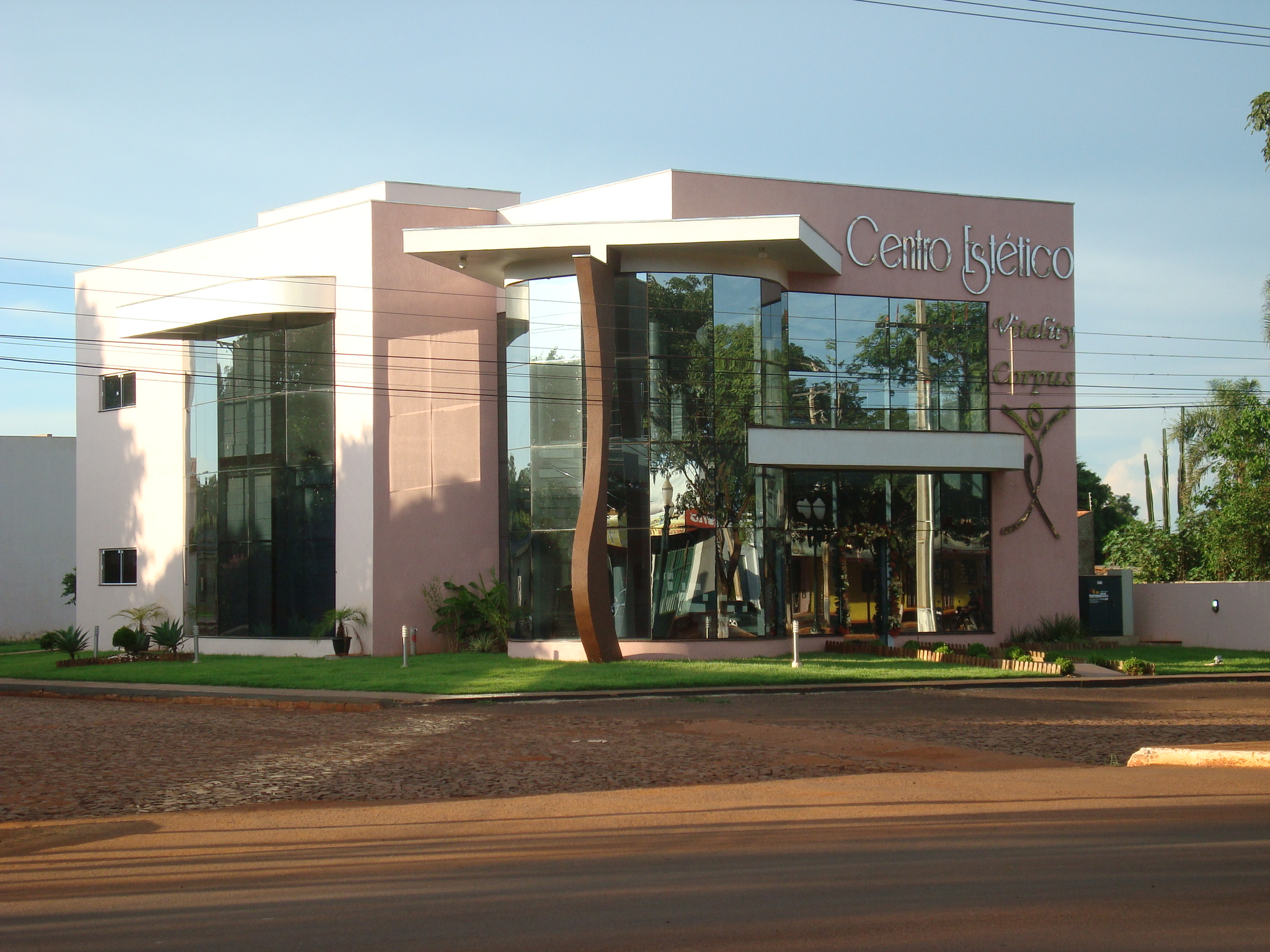
Building in Katuete

Katueté is a municipality of Paraguay that is located in the central area of the Department of Canindeyú. The district was created by law no. 342/94 on May 24, 1994. It is located 362 km from the capital city of Asunción, on Route 10.

The name of Katueté is attributed to Dr. Alejandro Encina Marín, who on a tour with the owners of the area looking for a suitable site for the creation of an urban center, expressed upon arriving at the place in the Guaraní language "katueté voi, ko ape oî porâta”, to the owners' statement about the benefits of the location of that site.

== Geography ==
The so-called “high zone” has experienced a notable development, from the specific perspective of the physical aspect, it is clearly distinguished, valleys that are very suitable for agricultural activities, it essentially includes flat and undulating terrain, with lands very suitable for agriculture.

It borders Corpus Christi and Álvarez to the north; Nueva Esperanza to the south; Álvarez to the east and Corpus Christi and Ybyrarobaná in the west.

=== Hydrography ===
In the area there are important tributaries of the Paraná River, the Carapá River, in addition, the well-watered region has numerous water courses in its territory, such as the Tayi Caré streams and the Itabó stream, among other small water tributaries that They irrigate the region.

=== Climate ===
It has a subtropical climate, with an annual average of 21°C and a minimum average of 15°C. During the summer, temperatures of up to 41°C are recorded, while in the winter minimum temperatures as low as 0°C are observed. As for rainfall, there is abundant rain, with an average that ranges between 1,600 and 1,700 mm, with the month of May being the rainiest and the month of June the driest.

== Demographics ==
According to data provided by Paraguay's National Institute of Statistics, its total population is 10,912 inhabitants, of which 5,729 are men and 5,184 women. 70% of the population is settled in the rural area.

== Economy ==
The region's lands are fertile, and are mostly inhabited by Brazilian settlers. In the area the main crops are soy, wheat and cassava, constituting an important link in Paraguayan agricultural production and also a center for the development of a new cultural component, for the presence of the so-called brasiguayos, Paraguayan descendants of Brazilian settlers settled in the area.

Several sawmills operate in the area. Cassava processing plants operate in Katueté with private Brazilian investment. Other minor industries operate discreetly in the districts of the region.

== Infrastructure ==
The main land communication route is Route PY03, which connects it with Salto del Guairá and Asunción, and with other towns in the department and the country. 70% of the roads are terraced and 30% paved. It has a health center and does not include dispensaries in indigenous colonies. A large part of the population of Brazilian nationality uses health services in Brazil.

== Sources ==
- World Gazeteer: Paraguay – World-Gazetteer.com
- Katueté, Katuete, Departamento de Canindeyú, Paraguay, at Mindat
