= Canindeyú Department =

Department of Paraguay

Canindeyú Departamento de Canindeyú (Spanish) Tetãvore Kanindeju (Guarani)
- Department
- Flag
- Etymology: Guarani: Kaninde ju (blue-and-yellow macaw)
- Coordinates: 24°1′S 54°20′W
- Country: Paraguay
- Capital: Salto del Guairá

Government
  - Governor: Nelson Martínez (ANR)

Area
  - Total: 14,677 km^{2} (5,667 sq mi)

Population (2022)
  - Total: 191,114
  - Density: 13.021/km^{2} (33.725/sq mi)
- Time zone: UTC-03 (PYT)
- ISO 3166 code: PY-14
- Number of Districts: 10

Canindeyú (Spanish pronunciation: [kanindeˈʝu]) is a department in Paraguay. The capital is the city of Salto del Guairá. Canindeyú comes from the Guarani words Kaninde - macaw; ju - yellow, blue-and-yellow macaw (Ara ararauna).

== Districts ==
The department is divided into 16 districts:

1. Corpus Christi
2. Curuguaty
3. General Francisco Caballero Álvarez (Puente Kyhá)
4. Itanará
5. Katueté
6. La Paloma
7. Laurel
8. Maracaná
9. Nueva Esperanza
10. Puerto Adela
11. Salto del Guairá
12. Villa Ygatimí
13. Yasy Cañy
14. Yby Pytá
15. Ybyrarobaná
16. Ypehú

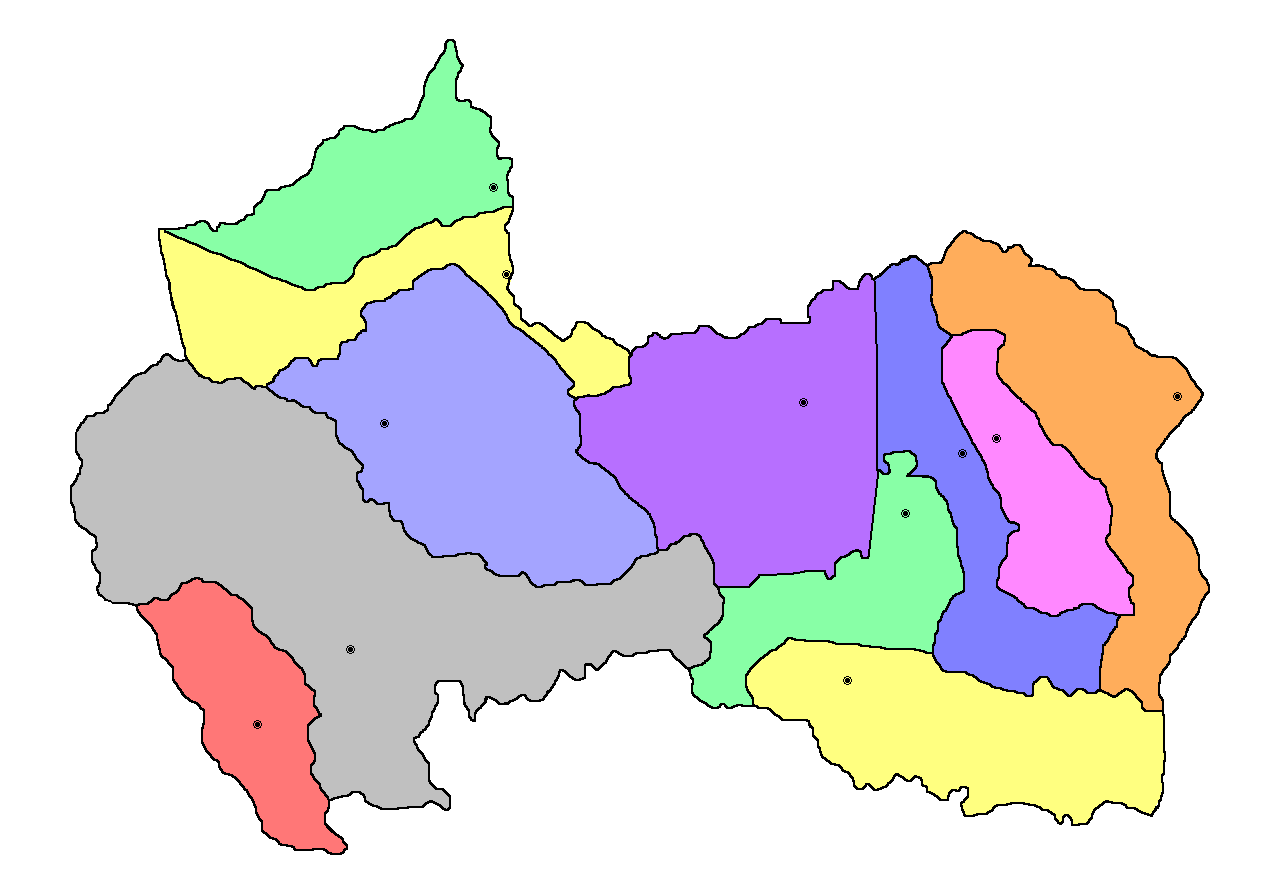

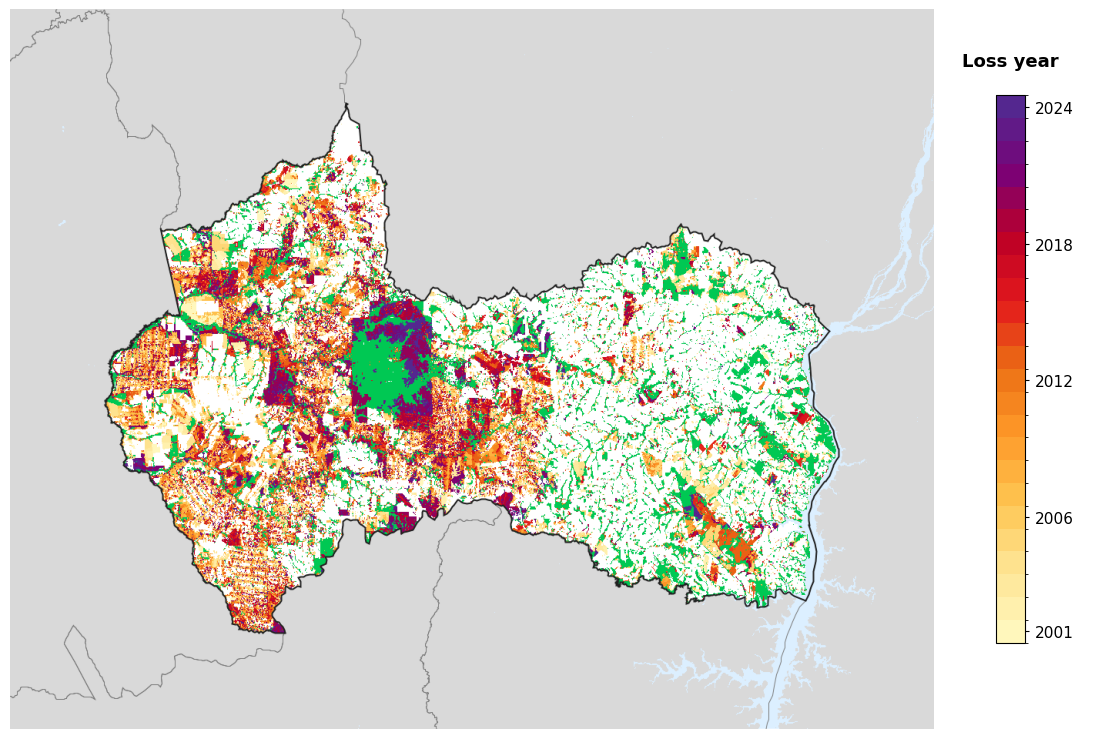
Tree-cover loss year in Canindeyú, 2001-2024, from the Global Forest Change dataset.

The eastern part of Canindeyu is very green; mostly rolling hills and soy bean farms. A fair portion of the population consists of Brazilian immigrants and Portuguese is widely spoken, along with Spanish and Guaraní.
