= La Paloma, Paraguay =

La Paloma del Espíritu Santo La Paloma
- Location within Paraguay
- Coordinates: 24°7′59″S 54°36′59″W
- Country: Paraguay
- Department: Canindeyú

Population (2002)
  - Total: 6,373
- Time zone: UTC-3
- Postal code: 140901, 140902, 140903, 140904, 140905
- Area code: 471

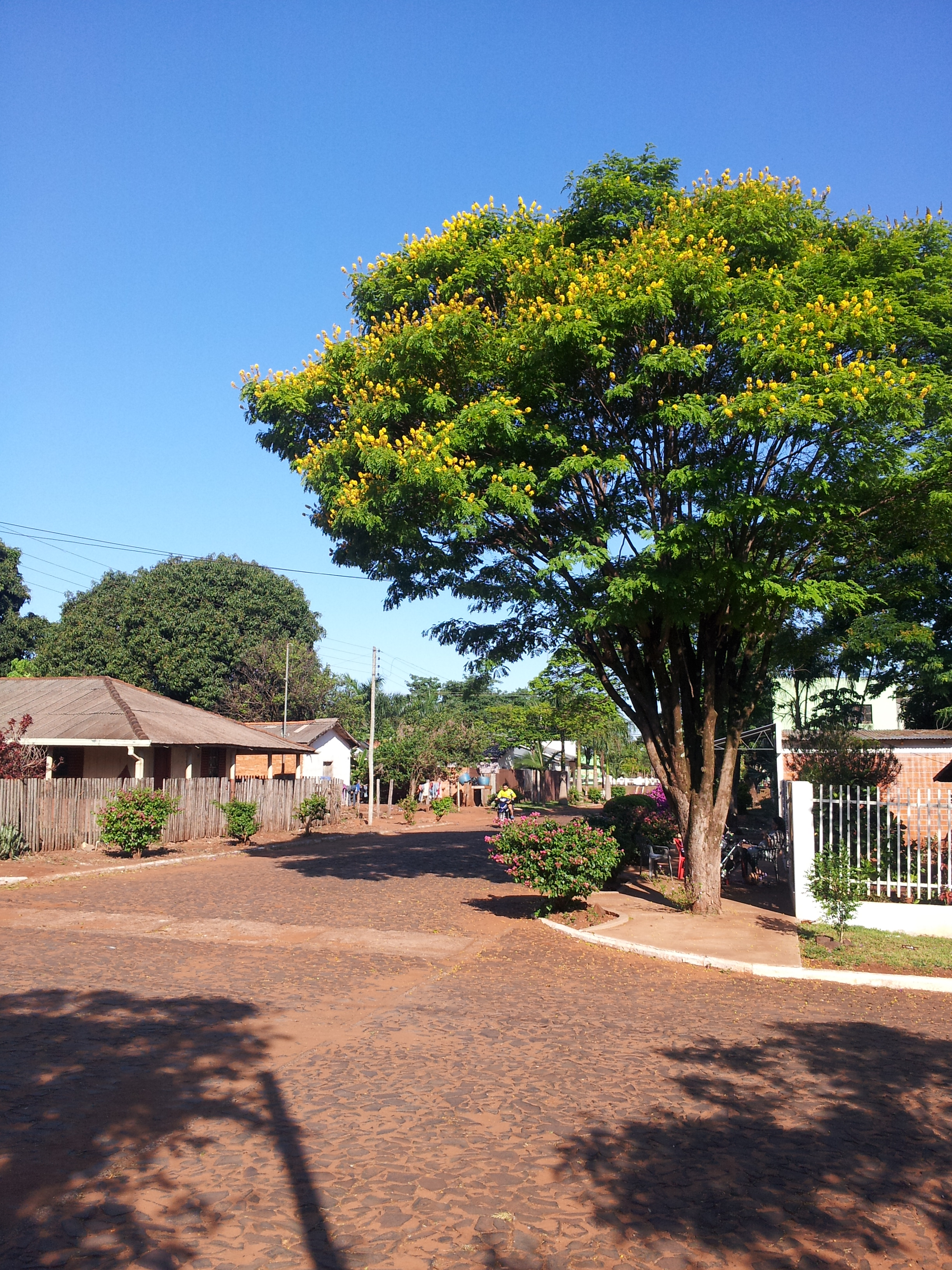
14 de Mayo Street and Defensores del Chaco

La Paloma (La Paloma del Espíritu Santo) is a town in the Canindeyú department of Paraguay.
