= Francisco C. Álvarez =

Cebuano Visayan stage actor and playwright

Francisco C. Álvarez (1903–1963) was a Cebuano Visayan stage actor and playwright. He was a staff member of The Freeman. He wrote a play entitled Dinagmalan, published in Bisaya in 1948.
