= Itanará =

- Location within Paraguay
- Coordinates: 23°49′12″S 55°46′48″W
- Country: Paraguay
- Department: Canendiyú

Population (2008)
  - Total: 344

Itanará is a district and town in the Canendiyú department of Paraguay.

== Sources ==
- World Gazeteer: Paraguay – World-Gazetteer.com
