= Ygatimí =

Villa Ygatimí
- Location within Paraguay
- Coordinates: 24°4′48″S 55°30′0″W
- Country: Paraguay
- Department: Canendiyú

Population (2008)
  - Total: 3 577

Villa Ygatimí is a town founded in 1715 in the Canendiyú department of Paraguay.

== Sources ==
- World Gazeteer: Paraguay – World-Gazetteer.com
