= Ypehú =

- Location within Paraguay
- Coordinates: 23°54′36″S 55°27′36″W
- Country: Paraguay
- Department: Canendiyú

Population (2008)
  - Total: 2,299

Ypehú is a town in the Canendiyú department of Paraguay.

== Sources ==
- World Gazeteer: Paraguay – World-Gazetteer.com
