= Football Federation of the 2nd Department San Pedro =

The Football Federation of the 2nd Department San Pedro (Federación de Fútbol Segundo Departamento San Pedro) is the departamental governing body of football (soccer) in the department of San Pedro, in Paraguay. The federation is responsible for the organization of football leagues in the different cities of the department and it is also the regulator of the clubs. The main office of this federation is located in the city of San Pedro.

Tournaments for each league of this federation are played every year to determine the best teams. Afterwards, the champions of each league face each other to determine the best team in the department, with the overall winner being promoted to a higher division in the Paraguayan football league system.

== Leagues in San Pedro ==
=== Liga Aguaray de Fútbol ===
The Liga Aguaray de Fútbol is based in the city of Lima. The following teams are part of this league:

- Atlético Limpeño
- Mariscal López
- 15 de Mayo
- Mayor Hermosa
- Sportivo Número Uno
- Aquidaban
- Jovenes Unidos
- Sportivo San Antonio

=== Liga Deportiva Capiibary ===
The Liga Deportiva Capiibary is based in the city of Capiibary. The following teams are part of this league:

- Atlético Universal
- 26 de Febrero
- Sportivo 1 de Marzo
- 4 de Mayo
- Sportivo Capiibary
- Colonos Unidos
- 1 de Mayo
- 1 de Marzo
- 14 de Mayo
- Nueva Estrella
- Atlético Central
- 3 de Noviembre
- 24 de Junio
- 24 de Mayo

=== Liga Deportiva de Choré ===
The Liga Deportiva de Choré is based in the city of Choré. The following teams are part of this league:

- Sol de Mayo
- Dr. Juan Manuel Frutos
- Coronel Panchito López
- Sportivo Coe Pyta
- 13 de Mayo FBC
- General Caballero
- El Porvenir
- Santa Elena
- 6 de Enero
- Nueva Estrella
- El Millonario de Nuclear N° 3
- Sportivo Cocuera FBC

=== Liga Gral. Aquino de Fútbol ===
The Liga Gral. Aquino de Fútbol is based in the city of General Aquino. The following teams are part of this league:

- 24 de Mayo
- 1 de Marzo
- Teniente Turo
- Cerro Porteño
- 12 de Agosto
- 6 de Enero
- Olimpia
- Sportivo Ñumbue
- Sportivo San Blas
- 8 de Diciembre
- Cerro León
- 13 de Diciembre
- General Aquino
- Mariscal Estigarribia
- Guaraní
- 12 de Junio
- Sportivo Luqueño
- Sportivo Corralense

=== Liga Deportiva Gral. Resquín ===
The Liga Deportiva Gral. Resquín is based in the city of Gral. Resquin. The following teams are part of this league:

- Universal
- Atlético Central
- Union Nacional
- 8 de Diciembre
- Atletico Quiindy
- Solar de San Vicente
- 1 de Enero
- 20 de Julio
- Atletico Central
- 8 de Diciembre
- 3 de Febrero
- San José Central
- 13 de Mayo

=== Liga Germanina de Deportes ===
The Liga Germanina de Deportes is based in the city of Nueva Germania. The following teams are part of this league:

- Cerro Porteño
- Sportivo 24 de Junio
- 15 de Agosto FBC
- Atletico Aguaray Mi
- 3 de Mayo
- Olimpia

=== Liga Deportiva de Guayaybí ===
The Liga Deportiva de Guayaybí is based in the city of Guayaybí. The following teams are part of this league:

- Hijos de Defensores del Chaco
- Raza Guaraní
- 29 de Junio
- Atletico River Plate
- 8 de Diciembre
- 12 de Junio
- Nueva Estrella
- 8 de Diciembre
- Mariscal Estigarribia
- Sportivo Amistad
- Atletico Independiente
- Sportivo Santo Domingo

=== Liga Residenta de Fútbol ===
The Liga Residenta de Fútbol is based in the city of Itacurubí del Rosario. The following teams are part of this league:

- Cerro Porteño
- Sportivo Itacurubi
- 12 de Octubre
- General Caballero
- Mariscal Estigarribia
- Libertad FBC
- Sportivo Lujan
- Deportivo Sol de Mayo
- Sportivo San Luis
- Sportivo Morel
- Atlético General Stroessner

=== Liga Rosarina de Deportes ===
The Liga Rosarina de Deportes is based in the city of Villa del Rosario. The following teams are part of this league:

- Cerro Corá
- Mariscal López
- General Stroessner
- Sol de Mayo
- Rosario Central
- Independiente
- 24 de Noviembre
- Defensores del Chaco

=== Liga Sampedrana de Deportes ===
The Liga Sampedrana de Deportes is based in the city of San Pedro Ycuamandyyú. The following teams are part of this league:

- Libertad
- 29 de Junio
- General Caballero FBC
- 1 de Marzo
- General Marcial Samaniego FBC
- Atletico Nanawa
- Sportivo Villa Mercedes
- Sportivo Santa Rosa

=== Liga Santaniana de Deportes ===
The Liga Santaniana de Deportes is based in the city of San Estanislao. The following teams are part of this league:

- Olimpia
- Mariscal Lopez FBC
- Monte Alto
- Union Agricola
- 13 de Noviembre
- Atletico Defensores
- Coronel Vicente Mongelos FBC
- Sportivo San Lorenzo
- 8 de Diciembre
- Sport Mboiy F.C.

=== Liga Deportiva Yataíty Corá ===
The Liga Deportiva Yataíty Corá is based in the city of Yataity Corá. The following teams are part of this league:

- 3 de Mayo
- Libertad
- 8 de Diciembre
- 6 de Enero
- 24 de Junio
- Olimpia
- 4 de octubre de mboiy

=== Liga Santarroseña de Deportes ===
The Liga Santarroseña de Deportes is based in the city of Yataity Corá. The following teams are part of this league:

- 29 de Junio
- Atletico Central
- Atletico Loma Pucú
- Hijos del Norte
- S.D. San Ramón
- Juventud Unido
- Sportivo 4 de Diciembre
- Agro Sport Prosperidad
- Atletico Kororo-í
