= General Francisco Caballero Álvarez =

- Location within Paraguay
- Coordinates: 24.1543°S 54.6659°W
- Country: Paraguay
- Department: Canindeyú
- Established: 1987

Population (2002)
  - Total: 8,884
- Area code: 7980

General Francisco Caballero Álvarez or General Francisco Álvarez (also known as Puente Kyhá) is a town and district in the Canendiyú department of Paraguay. It is located about 500 km (310 mi) away from Asunción, the capital of the country, by Route Number 3.

== Sources ==
- World Gazeteer: Paraguay – World-Gazetteer.com
