= Football Federation of the 1st Department Concepción =

Departamental governing body of football in the department of Concepción, Paraguay

The Football Federation of the 1st Department Concepción (Federación de Fútbol Primer Departamento Concepción) is the departmental governing body of football in the department of Concepción, in Paraguay. The federation is responsible for the organization of football leagues in the different cities of the department and it is also the regulator of the clubs. The main office of this federation is located in the city of Concepción.

Tournaments for each league of this federation are played every year to determine the best teams. Afterwards, the champions of each league face each other to determine the best team in the department, with the overall winner being promoted to a higher division in the Paraguayan football league system.

== Leagues in Concepción ==
=== Liga Concepcionera de Fútbol ===
The Liga Concepcionera de Fútbol is based in the city of Concepción. The following teams are part of this league:

- Sportivo Obrero
- Nanawa
- Independencia FBC
- Adolfo Riquelme
- Mariscal López
- Gral. Eugenio Garay
- Sportivo Cerro Corá
- Deportivo Beleano
- Villareal

=== Liga Horqueteña de Fútbol ===
The Liga Horqueteña de Fútbol is based in the city of Horqueta. The following teams are part of this league:

- Libertad
- Sport Capitan Walter Gwynn
- San Lorenzo
- Racing Club Horqueta
- Deportivo Horqueteño
- Sport Caacupé
- Fulgencio Yegros

=== Liga Loreteña de Fútbol ===
The Liga Loreteña de Fútbol is based in the city of Loreto. The following teams are part of this league:

- Atlético Independiente
- Sportivo Agrícola
- 10 de Diciembre
- Teniente 1° Adolfo Rojas Silva
- 6 de Enero
- Sportivo Florida
- Cerro Porteño

=== Liga Deportiva Vallemi ===
The Liga Deportiva Vallemi is based in the city of Vallemi. The following teams are part of this league:

- Oriental FBC
- Independiente FBC
- Sportivo Vallemi
- Sportivo Obrero
- 29 de Setiembre
- Sportivo Caleros Unidos del Norte

=== Liga Ybyyauense de Fútbol ===
The Liga Ybyyauense de Fútbol is based in the city of Yby Yaú. The following teams are part of this league:

- Atlético San Ramón
- Nacional
- Sportivo San Juan
- 13 de Junio
- Atlético Yby Yaú
- 1° de Mayo
