= Paraguayan football league system =

The Paraguayan football league system is a series of interconnected leagues for football clubs in Paraguay.

== Overview ==
At the top is the Primera División or División de Honor (first division) with 12 clubs.

Below the 1st level is the Intermedia (second division).

In order to get promoted to the Intermedia there are two subdivisions at the 3rd level: the Primera División B Metropolitana, which comprises teams from the Gran Asunción area; and the Primera División B Nacional which contains the best teams from the different Departments of Paraguay.

The 4th level is similar, with the Primera División C containing only teams from the Gran Asunción area. The other subdivision is composed of all 17 federations from each Paraguayan Department (governed by the UFI), which in turn, contain several regional leagues that cover the whole country.

== 2024 ==
Level	League(s)/Division(s)		
1st	Primera División; 12 clubs		
	↓↑ 2 clubs		
2nd	División Intermedia; 16 clubs		
	↓ 1-3 clubs	↓ 1-3 clubs	
	↑ 1-2 clubs	↑ 0-2 clubs	↑ 0-1 club
3rd	Primera División B Metropolitana; 17 clubs	Primera División B Nacional; 18 clubs	Campeonato Nacional de Interligas; 31 local league teams
	↓↑ 2 clubs		
4th	Primera División C 12 clubs		Regional leagues Over 1,700 clubs in 163 leagues
	↓ 1 club		
	Disaffiliation for one season		

== See also ==
- Football in Paraguay
- Primera División Paraguaya
- División Intermedia
- Paraguayan Tercera División
- Paraguayan Primera División B
- Primera División B Nacional
- Paraguayan Cuarta División
- Campeonato Nacional de Interligas
- Unión del Fútbol del Interior
- Paraguayan women's football championship
- Football Federation of the 1st Department Concepción
- Football Federation of the 2nd Department San Pedro
- Football Federation of the 3rd Department Cordillera
- Football Federation of the 4th Department Guairá
- Football Federation of the 5th Department Caaguazú
- Football Federation of the 6th Department Caazapá
- Football Federation of the 7th Department Itapúa
- Football Federation of the 8th Department Misiones
- Football Federation of the 9th Department Paraguarí
- Football Federation of the 10th Department Alto Paraná
- Football Federation of the 11th Department Central
- Football Federation of the 12th Department Ñeembucú
- Football Federation of the 13th Department Amambay
- Football Federation of the 14th Department Canindeyú
- Football Federation of the 15th Department Presidente Hayes
- Football Federation of the 16th Department Alto Paraguay
- Football Federation of the 17th Department Boquerón
