= Football Federation of the 6th Department Caazapá =

Governing body of football in Caazapá, Paraguay

The Football Federation of the 6th Department Caazapá (Federación de Fútbol Sexto Departamento Caazapá) is the departamental governing body of football (soccer) in the department of Caazapá, in Paraguay. The federation is responsible for the organization of football leagues in the different cities of the department and it is also the regulator of the clubs. The main office of this federation is located in the city of Caazapá.

Tournaments for each league of this federation are played every year to determine the best teams. Afterwards, the champions of each league face each other to determine the best team in the department, with the overall winner being promoted to a higher division in the Paraguayan football league system.

== Leagues in Caazapá ==
=== Liga Abaiense de Fútbol ===
The Liga Abaiense de Fútbol is based in the city of Abaí. The following teams are part of this league:

- 16 de Agosto
- Atletico San Sebastian
- 29 de Setiembre
- Union Santa Elena
- Atletico San Miguel
- 15 de Mayo
- 15 de Agosto
- 12 de Junio
- 6 de Enero
- 1 de Mayo

=== Liga Buenavisteña de Fútbol ===
The Liga Buenavisteña de Fútbol is based in the city of Buenavista. The following teams are part of this league:

- Olimpia
- Sportivo Central
- Cerro Porteño
- Sportivo Juventud
- Atletico Asuncion
- Acosta Nu
- Guarani

=== Liga Caazapeña de Fútbol ===
The Liga Caazapeña de Fútbol is based in the city of Caazapá. The following teams are part of this league:

- 25 de Enero
- Teniente Dionicio Fariña
- Fray Luis de Bolaños
- Juventud
- Nanawa
- Sportivo Agricola
- Guarani
- 25 de Abril
- 16 de Agosto
- 1 de Enero
- 27 de Setiembre

=== Liga Deportiva Gral. H. Morínigo ===
The Liga Deportiva Gral. H. Morínigo is based in the city of Gral. H. Morínigo. The following teams are part of this league:

- 25 de Abril
- Sportivo Santa Maria
- 12 de Octubre
- Sportivo San Estanislao
- Cerro Porteño
- Atletico 1 de Mayo
- Ferroviario
- 14 de Mayo
- 20 de Julio FBC
- 1 de Marzo

=== Liga de Fútbol Gobernador Rivera ===
The Liga de Fútbol Gobernador Rivera is based in the city of San Juan Neponuceno. The following teams are part of this league:

- 16 de Mayo
- Sportivo San Carlos
- Sportivo 4 de Noviembre
- 25 de Enero
- Atletico Juventud
- 13 de Junio
- Sportivo San Juan
- Atletico Independiente
- Atletico 3 de Febrero
- 30 de Agosto

=== Liga Yegreña de Fútbol ===
The Liga Yegreña de Fútbol is based in the city of Fulgencio Yegros. The following teams are part of this league:

- 14 de Mayo FBC
- Sportivo Soseno
- Sportivo San Rafael
- Independiente
- Humaita FBC
- Union Club SD
- Helvecia FBC
- Sportivo Obrero

=== Liga Yuteña de Fútbol ===
The Liga Yuteña de Fútbol is based in the city of Yuty. The following teams are part of this league:

- 30 de Agosto
- 6 de Enero
- Mcal. Jose Felix Estigarribia
- Cerro Porteño
- Sol de Mayo
- Sportivo Juvenil
- 4 de Diciembre
- Sportivo Navideño
- Capitan Brizuela Aldana
- Atletico 17 de Junio
- 24 de Junio FBC
- Coronel Martinez
- Atletico Capitan Benitez
- Deportivo Juventud
- Libertad
- Deportivo Obrero
