= Football Federation of the 5th Department Caaguazú =

Departmental governing body of football in the department of Caaguazú, Paraguay

The Football Federation of the 5th Department Caaguazú (Federación de Fútbol Quinto Departamento Caaguazú) is the departamental governing body of football (soccer) in the department of Caaguazú, in Paraguay. The federation is responsible for the organization of football leagues in the different cities of the department and it is also the regulator of the clubs. The main office of this federation is located in the city of Coronel Oviedo.

Tournaments for each league of this federation are played every year to determine the best teams. Afterwards, the champions of each league face each other to determine the best team in the department, with the overall winner being promoted to a higher division in the Paraguayan football league system.

== Leagues in Caaguazú ==
=== Liga Caaguazú de Fútbol ===
The Liga Caaguazú de Fútbol is based in the city of Caaguazú. The following teams are part of this league:

- Sportivo San Lorenzo
- Atletico Caaguazu
- Olimpia
- Cerro Porteno
- 15 de Agosto
- 8 de Diciembre
- General Bernardino Caballero
- Carlos Antonio Lopez
- Guarani
- Sportivo Villa Construccion
- 19 de Marzo

=== Liga Deportiva de Carayao ===
The Liga Deportiva de Carayao is based in the city of Carayao. The following teams are part of this league:

- Nacional
- Sportivo Carayao
- 6 de Enero
- 1 de Mayo
- 29 de Junio
- 3 de Febrero
- 13 de Junio
- 25 de Enero
- 13 de Diciembre
- Jovenes Unidos
- 3 de Febrero
- 13 de Junio
- 8 de Diciembre
- Sportivo Mainumby

=== Liga de Fútbol Dr. Cecilio Báez ===
The Liga de Fútbol Dr. Cecilio Báez is based in the city of Cecilio Báez. The following teams are part of this league:

- Independiente
- 15 de Mayo
- 10 de Mayo
- 4 de Octubre
- 1 de Mayo
- Simon Bolivar
- 25 de Diciembre
- 11 de Febrero

=== Liga Deportiva Campo 9 ===
The Liga Deportiva Campo 9 is based in the city of Eulogio Estigarribia. The following teams are part of this league:

- Atletico Florestal
- Sportivo Campo 9
- Libertad
- Atletico Culantrillo
- Mariscal Lopez
- Atletico Valencia
- Santo Domingo de Guzman
- Sol del Este
- 1 de Marzo
- Independiente
- Atletico Raul Arsenio Oviedo

=== Liga Santarroseña de Fútbol ===
The Liga Santarroseña de Fútbol is based in the city of Santa Rosa del Mbutuy. The following teams are part of this league:

- 30 de Agosto
- Guarani
- 13 de Mayo
- Nueva Estrella
- 6 de Enero
- 24 de Junio FBC
- Nacional FBC
- 8 de Diciembre
- 4 de Agosto
- Nacional
- Deportivo San Jose Obrero
- S.D. San Agustin

=== Liga Deportiva La Pastora ===
The Liga Deportiva La Pastora is based in the city of La Pastora. The following teams are part of this league:

- 13 de Junio FBC
- Sportivo Santo Domingo
- Libertad
- Union Agricola
- Atletico Central
- Raza Guarani
- 25 de Diciembre

=== Liga Ovetense de Fútbol ===
The Liga Ovetense de Fútbol is based in the city of Coronel Oviedo. The following teams are part of this league:

- 12 de Junio
- Galicia FBC
- Cerro Porteno
- Libertad
- 15 de Mayo FBC
- Juventud Guarani
- Sportivo Aguapety
- General Diaz
- 3 de Noviembre
- 11 de Setiembre
- S.D. San Miguel
- 1 de Mayo
- 1 de Marzo
- Sportivo Blas Garay
- 12 de Octubre
- Coronel Oviedo
- Universitario
- 8 de Diciembre
- Juventud Ita Ybate
- S. y D. Guarani

=== Liga Deportiva de Pastoreo ===
The Liga Deportiva de Pastoreo is based in the city of Juan Manuel Frutos. The following teams are part of this league:

- Sportivo Pastoreo
- Nueva Estrella
- 29 de Setiembre
- Sportivo Santa Rosa
- 20 de Julio
- Sol de America

=== Liga Repatriación de Fútbol ===
The Liga Repatriación de Fútbol is based in the city of Repatriación. The following teams are part of this league:

- Atletico Repatriacion
- 1 de Mayo
- 24 de Mayo
- Vicente Ignacio Iturbe
- Atletico Unidos
- General Fco. Caballero Alvarez
- Sportivo Chacore
- Universo
- Universidad Catolica
- Juventud Unidos

=== Liga Deportiva San Joaquín ===
The Liga Deportiva San Joaquín is based in the city of San Joaquín. The following teams are part of this league:

- Teniente Robustiano Esquibel
- Guarani
- 1 de Mayo
- Sportivo San Joaquin
- Atletico Peyupa
- 1 de Enero

=== Liga Sanjosiana de Deportes ===
The Liga Caaguazú de Fútbol is based in the city of San José de los Arroyos. The following teams are part of this league:

- Sportivo San Jose
- 20 de Julio
- Sportivo Paraguay
- Capellan Benicio Britos
- Atletico Independiente
- 13 de Junio
- 19 de Marzo
- Olimpia
- Deportivo San Blas
- J.D.K. Fútbol club

=== Liga Deportiva de Yhú ===
The Liga Deportiva de Yhú is based in the city of Yhú. The following teams are part of this league:

- Deportivo Yhu
- Atletico Cerro Cora
- 29 de Setiembre
- Sportivo San Ramon
- Deportivo Agricola
- 1 de Mayo
- 24 de Mayo
- Independiente

=== Liga Deportiva 3 de Febrero ===
The following teams are part of this league:

- 24 de Junio
- 3 de Febrero
- 19 de Marzo
- Deportivo San Carlos
- Boca Juniors
- 20 de Junio
- Nacional
- Atletico Juventud Unido

=== Liga Deportiva Agro-Yguazú ===
The following teams are part of this league:

- Atletico Raul Arsenio Oviedo
- Atletico Universal
- 8 de Diciembre
- Atletico Sol Naciente
- Atletico Central
- Atletico Sati
- Sport Yhaguy

=== Liga Vaquería de Fútbol ===
The following teams are part of this league:

- Atletico Vaqueria
- 12 de Octubre
- 24 de Junio
- Union Agricola
- Libertad
- Nueva Estrella
- Atletico Tekojoja
- 1 de Marzo
- Nueva Toledo
