= Jorge Valdez =

Paraguayan footballer (born 1974)

Personal information
- Full name: Jorge Daniel Valdez Godoy
- Date of birth: 14 July 1974 (age 52)
- Place of birth: Concepción, Paraguay
- Position: Defender

Youth career
- Olimpia Asunción

Senior career*
Years	Team	Apps	(Gls)
1996–2001	Olimpia Asunción	57	(4)
2001	Sol de América	6	(0)
2002	12 de Octubre	20	(1)
2003	Central Norte		
2003	12 de Octubre	6	(0)
2004	Sportivo Luqueño	1	(0)
2004–2005	General Caballero	23	(1)
2006	2 de Mayo	32	(0)
2007	3 de Febrero	13	(0)

International career
1999	Paraguay	1	(0)
- * Club domestic league appearances and goals

Jorge Daniel Valdez Godoy (born 14 July 1974) is a Paraguayan former footballer who played as a defender.

== Career ==
Valdez started his career in Olimpia Asunción as a right-side defender, and won several national championships with the team. He then went on to play for many Paraguayan teams and for the Argentine side Central Norte. His nickname is "Repollo" (Cabbage).

Valdez made one appearance with the Paraguay national team in 1999.

== Titles ==
Season	Team	Title
1997	Olimpia	Paraguayan 1st Division
1998	Olimpia	Paraguayan 1st Division
1999	Olimpia	Paraguayan 1st Division
2000	Olimpia	Paraguayan 1st Division
