= Nelson Zelaya =

Paraguayan footballer (born 1973)

Personal information
- Full name: Nelson Fabián Zelaya Ramírez
- Date of birth: 9 July 1973 (age 53)
- Place of birth: Asunción, Paraguay
- Height: 1.85 m (6 ft 1 in)
- Position: Defender

Youth career
- Atlético Juventud

Senior career*
Years	Team	Apps	(Gls)
1996–2000	Olimpia	63	(0)
2001	Cerro Porteño	16	(0)
2002	Olimpia	13	(1)
2002–2003	Recreativo Huelva	1	(0)
2003–2004	Olimpia	6	(0)
2004	Universidad de Concepción	11	(0)
2005	Nacional	5	(0)
2005	Estudiantes de Mérida	17	(2)
2006	The Strongest		

International career
2000–2002	Paraguay	7	(0)

Managerial career
- 2013: Cerro Porteño PF (assistant)
- 2013: Cerro Porteño PF
- * Club domestic league appearances and goals

Nelson Fabián Zelaya Ramírez (born 9 July 1973, in Asunción) is a Paraguayan former footballer who played as a defender.

== Career ==
Zelaya started his career at the youth divisions of Atletico Juventud of Loma Pyta before signing for Olimpia in 1996. While in Olimpia, Zelaya won several national and international championships and was a key part of the defense. He also played for Olimpia's rival Cerro Porteño in 2001 and had brief stints in Spain, Chile, Venezuela and Bolivia where he played for teams like Recreativo Huelva, Universidad de Concepción, Estudiantes de Mérida and The Strongest.

== Titles ==
Season	Team	Title
1997	Olimpia	Paraguayan 1st Division
1998	Olimpia	Paraguayan 1st Division
1999	Olimpia	Paraguayan 1st Division
2000	Olimpia	Paraguayan 1st Division
2001	Cerro Porteño	Paraguayan 1st Division
2002	Olimpia	Copa Libertadores
2003	Olimpia	Recopa Sudamericana
