= Ricardo Tavarelli =

Paraguayan footballer (born 1970)

Personal information
- Full name: Ricardo Javier Tavarelli Paiva
- Date of birth: 2 August 1970 (age 56)
- Place of birth: Asunción, Paraguay
- Position: Goalkeeper

Youth career
- Tacuary
- Olimpia

Senior career*
Years	Team	Apps	(Gls)
1992–2003	Olimpia		
2004	Grêmio		
2005	Olimpia		
2005	Sportivo Luqueño		

International career
1998–2004	Paraguay	31	(0)
- * Club domestic league appearances and goals

Ricardo Javier Tavarelli Paiva (born 2 August 1970) is a former Paraguayan footballer, who played as a goalkeeper.

== Career ==
Tavarelli started his career in the youth divisions of Tacuary and then moved to the youth divisions of Club Olimpia, where he made his debut in the first team squad in 1992, playing the Torneo Republica. In Olimpia he would go on to win several national and international championships, becoming a fan-favorite. Tavarelli was a pivotal part of the 2002 Olimpia team that won the Copa Libertadores. His skills helped Olimpia win two key penalty shoot-outs against Grêmio of Porto Alegre (semi-finals) and São Caetano (finals). In 2004, he played for Grêmio of Brazil with little success. Tavarelli returned to Club Olimpia and also had a brief sting playing for Sportivo Luqueño before finally retiring. He earned the nickname "Mono" (monkey) because of his quick goalkeeping skills. He was also called "Lettuce Hands".

Tavarelli was also part of the Paraguay national team in the 2002 FIFA World Cup, playing the team's first two matches following the suspension of captain José Luis Chilavert prior to the tournament.

Tavarelli's sister, Giselle, is married to Paraguayan footballer Roque Santa Cruz.

== Titles ==
Season	Team	Title
1992	Olimpia	Torneo República
1993	Olimpia	Paraguayan 1st division
1995	Olimpia	Paraguayan 1st division
1997	Olimpia	Paraguayan 1st division
1998	Olimpia	Paraguayan 1st division
1999	Olimpia	Paraguayan 1st division
2000	Olimpia	Paraguayan 1st division
2002	Olimpia	Copa Libertadores
2003	Olimpia	Recopa Sudamericana
