= Roque Santa Cruz =

Paraguayan footballer (born 1981)

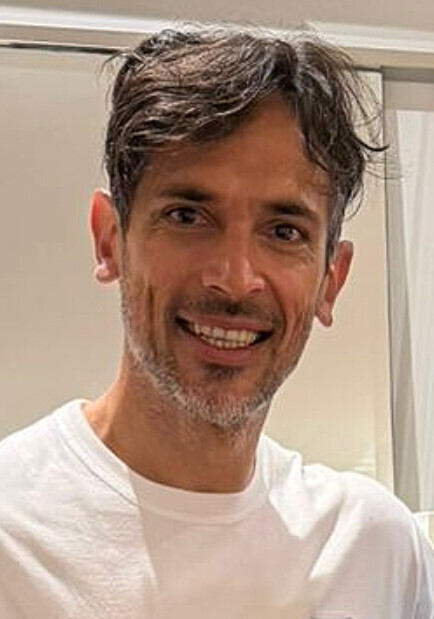
- Santa Cruz in 2025

Personal information
- Full name: Roque Luis Santa Cruz Cantero
- Date of birth: 16 August 1981 (age 45)
- Place of birth: Asunción, Paraguay
- Height: 1.93 m (6 ft 4 in)
- Position: Striker

Team information
- Current team: Nacional
- Number: 24

Youth career
- 1990–1997: Olimpia

Senior career*
Years	Team	Apps	(Gls)
1997–1999	Olimpia	24	(7)
1999–2007	Bayern Munich	155	(31)
2005–2006	Bayern Munich II	6	(2)
2007–2009	Blackburn Rovers	57	(23)
2009–2013	Manchester City	20	(3)
2011	→ Blackburn Rovers (loan)	9	(0)
2011–2012	→ Betis (loan)	33	(7)
2012–2013	→ Málaga (loan)	31	(8)
2013–2014	Málaga	43	(9)
2015–2016	Cruz Azul	10	(4)
2015–2016	→ Málaga (loan)	17	(2)
2016–2021	Olimpia	148	(66)
2022–2025	Libertad	132	(23)
2026–	Nacional	20	(5)

International career
1999	Paraguay U20	13	(6)
2000	Paraguay U23	4	(2)
1999–2016	Paraguay	112	(32)
Medal record
Representing Paraguay
Copa América
Runner-up	2011 Argentina
- * Club domestic league appearances and goals as of 7 October 2026

Roque Luis Santa Cruz Cantero (locally [ˈroke ˈlwis santa ˈkɾus kanˈteɾo]; born 16 August 1981) is a Paraguayan professional footballer who plays as a striker for Paraguayan Primera División club Nacional. He is the record goal scorer and has earned over 100 caps for the Paraguay national team, thus he is regarded as one of the best players in the nation's history. Santa Cruz has scored goals at a professional level in each of the last four decades (alongside Sebastian Abreu, Zlatan Ibrahimovic, Joaquín Sánchez and José Sand). He is also one of the few footballers to have made over 1,050 competitive appearances, and only the first Paraguayan to achieve this feat.

Santa Cruz started his career with Olimpia, progressing through their youth system to the first-team squad where he made his debut at the age of 15 in 1997. He finished his career with the club having scored 13 goals in 24 Primera División appearances where Olimpia claimed the 1997, 1998 and 1999 Primera División titles. Santa Cruz scored three goals in four appearances for Paraguay at the 1999 FIFA World Youth Championship before debuting for the Paraguay national team at the 1999 Copa América, where he scored three goals in four appearances. He immediately joined Bundesliga club Bayern Munich in August 1999 for a fee of €5 million, which was the highest transfer fee in Paraguayan football until 2019. For Bayern, he scored five goals in 28 league appearances in his first season. He faced a series of injuries and heavy competition from teammates Giovane Élber, Roy Makaay and Claudio Pizarro which limited his impact and restricted his appearances for the club.

Santa Cruz was part of a successful team for Bayern, winning numerous Bundesliga, DFB-Pokal and DFB-Ligapokal titles. He also won the 2000–01 UEFA Champions League and the 2001 Intercontinental Cup. He left Bayern Munich in July 2007 to join Blackburn Rovers for a transfer fee of €5 million, where he scored 19 goals in the 2007–08 Premier League season. In June 2009, he joined Manchester City for a fee of £17.5 million on a four-year deal. Since his transfer, he was loaned out to Blackburn and Real Betis.

He represented Paraguay at the 2002, 2006 and 2010 FIFA World Cup tournaments, and at the 1999, 2007, 2011 (where Paraguay finished runners-up) and 2015 Copa América tournaments. He retired from international football in 2016, but reversed his decision in May 2019.

== Club career ==
=== Olimpia Asunción ===
==== 1990–1999 ====
Santa Cruz joined Primera División Paraguaya club Olimpia Asunción's youth academy at the age of nine, where he became the top scorer during several seasons. The club's first-team coach, Luis Cubilla, invited Santa Cruz to train with the team aged 15, and the player eventually made his first-team appearance in the 1997 Primera División Paraguaya at the age of 15, during the Torneo Clausura on 27 July when he entered the field in the 80th minute for Alfredo Mendoza in the Paraguayan derby against Cerro Porteño.

===== 1998 season =====
During the group stages of the 1998 Copa Mercosur, Santa Cruz scored his first goal of the competition in the 11th minute of Olimpia Asunción's 4–2 away victory against Argentine side Racing Club on 14 October 1998. The club finished in second position of their group with ten points, and advanced to the quarter-finals to face José Luís Chilavert's Vélez Sársfield. During the first-leg of the quarter-final match on 27 October, Santa Cruz scored in the 65th minute of Olimpia's 4–3 away victory. One week later, Santa Cruz scored a brace for Olimpia as they claimed a 2–1 home victory in the second leg on 4 November 1998. His goals came in the 24th and 40th minutes of the first half. All of his three goals were scored against his international teammate Chilavert. Bayern Munich's eyes looked at Santa Cruz for the first time after he scored his double past José Luís Chilavert. The club was later eliminated from the competition at the semi-final stage by Palmeiras, who would go on to win the tournament. During the 1998 Primera División Paraguaya season, Santa Cruz scored three goals in nine appearances as Olimpia were crowned champions of the league. The club had also reached the knock-out stages of the 1998 Copa Libertadores, where they were eliminated by Argentina's Colón.

===== 1999 season =====
During the 1999 Primera División Paraguaya season, Santa Cruz scored 4 goals and provided 6 assists in 14 appearances as Olimpia claimed the league title. Santa Cruz participated at the 1999 Copa Libertadores, where Olimpia were drawn in Group 3 with Cerro Porteño, eventual champions Palmeiras and Corinthians. In Olimpia first group stage match, against Cerro Porteño on 24 February, Santa Cruz scored a second-half double past Aldo Bobadilla in the 58th and 89th minutes as his side were defeated 4–3. On 5 March, Santa Cruz played a full 90 minutes in his side's second group stage match, a 4–2 home victory against Palmeiras. Santa Cruz again featured for Olimpia in their third group stage fixture, a 1–1 away draw against Palmeiras on 12 March. In Olimpia's fourth group stage fixture, Santa Cruz featured in the entire match as his side drew 2–2 at home against Cerro Porteño on 17 March. On 26 March, Santa Cruz played a full 90 minutes in Olimpia's 2–1 home defeat against Corinthians in their fifth Copa Libertadores group stage fixture. Olimpia had been 1–0 in front since the 31st minute of the match, before Corinthians would go on to score two goals in the second half.

On 16 May 1999, a Bayern Munich delegation composed of Franz Beckenbauer, Karl-Heinz Rummenigge, Uli Hoeneß, Søren Lerby and Giovanni Branchinni entered surprisingly into the Estadio General Pablo Rojas to see a game between 12 de Octubre and Olimpia Asunción, in which Santa Cruz scored and was Man of the Match, making Bayern Munich hurry with the transfer process. The following day during a reunion with Olimpia's president, Osvaldo Dominguez Dibb, who wanted the sale to reach US$10 million, said "Pay the sum, or Roque stays at Olimpia", stamping his hand on his desk table. To unblock the situation, Santa Cruz' father, Aproniano, renounced a 30% of the transfer that corresponded him and Santa Cruz joined Bayern Munich without obstacles.

Santa Cruz had scored two goals in five Copa Libertadores appearances and would not take part in his club's last group stage fixture, a 4–0 away defeat against Corinthians on 9 April, due to his participation for Paraguay U20 at the 1999 FIFA World Youth Championship, which was disputed at the same time. Santa Cruz played in his last Superclásico against Cerro Porteño in a 1–0 home victory during the 1999 Apertura on 30 May. Santa Cruz also played in his last competitive match for Olimpia Asunción a 1–0 win against Colegiales, on 6 June. The first contacts with Bayern Munich were via telephone and the US$20 million that the Olimpia Asunción president wanted for the transfer was considered by Bayern Munich a very elevated cost. His involvement with Paraguay's national teams, the striker was awarded with the Paraguayan Footballer of the Year award in 1999, and Olimpia club president Osvaldo Domínguez Dibb had assessed Santa Cruz to value from around US$20 million, however Santa Cruz was eventually sold to Bayern Munich for US$7 million, the transfer fee becoming the record transfer in Paraguayan football. He later revealed that he had the chance to join Real Madrid before he eventually signed with Bayern in 1999.

Santa Cruz confessed that his teammates and himself had been mis-treated by Osvaldo Domínguez Dibb after bad performances from the first-team where the players' salaries were not deposited into their bank accounts in order for the players to personally collect it in person from the president and would be threatened by guns and knives. "I remember that we once lost an important regional derby. The president entered the sleeping room where we all spent the night ahead of games and unloaded his gun in the ceiling. That wasn't all though. When a player had put in a bad performance, Osvaldo just strolled up to his car and urinated inside it while the player was standing right next to him. The president always wanted us to come up to him to pick up our monthly wages. If you hadn't played well that month, he stood up and asked 'What is it you want?' while tapping a machine gun on his desk. That always prompted players to wait for their money until they had put in some better performances again."

=== Bayern Munich ===
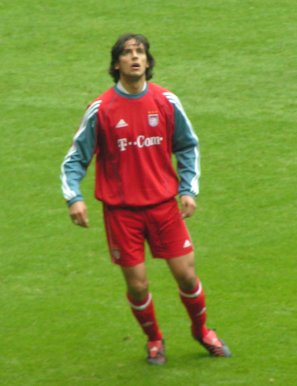
Santa Cruz with Bayern Munich in 2006

==== 1999–2000 season ====
Santa Cruz debuted for Bayern Munich in the 1999–00 Bundesliga season in a 2–0 loss against Bayer Leverkusen on 22 August 1999. Six days later, he scored his first league goal in the 40th minute of a 1–0 win against SpVgg Unterhaching on 28 August. He made his first appearance in the 1999–2000 UEFA Champions League on 15 September in a 2–1 victory over PSV. His first goal in the Champions League came on his fifth appearance in the competition as Bayern lost 2–1 against PSV, as was substituted onto the field on 26 minutes for Paulo Sérgio and scored with a right-footed shot on 51 minutes. He ended the season with five goals in 28 league appearances as Bayern were crowned champions of the 1999–2000 Bundesliga season. Santa Cruz had also made consecutive Champions League appearances until the semi-final stages where Bayern Munich were knocked out by Real Madrid. On 6 May 2000, he was substituted onto the field on 73 minutes for Carsten Jancker during the 1999–2000 DFB-Pokal final as Bayern Munich beat Werder Bremen 3–0. Santa Cruz finished the season with nine goals in 48 matches.

==== 2000–01 season ====
Prior to the start of the 2000–01 Bundesliga season, Santa Cruz scored in a semi-final 4–1 win against 1. FC Kaiserslautern in the 2000 DFB-Ligapokal on 30 July. During the final, he was substituted off the field for Carsten Jancker after just 46 minutes as Bayern Munich defeated Hertha BSC 5–1 on 1 August. Santa Cruz scored his first goal of the season, eight minutes after being substituted on for Alexander Zickler on the 11th minute, in a 3–0 away win to VfL Bochum on 19 August. On 19 September, in his first appearance of the 2000–01 Champions League, he was substituted onto the field after 46 minutes and then substituted off the field after 73 minutes. Four days later, he scored the winning goal in a 2–1 away victory to 1. FC Köln on 23 September. After suffering from an injury, he returned to action on 17 December to score the first goal of the game after 15 minutes in a 3–1 away win to Hertha BSC, he played 89 minutes of the match before being substituted off. He then missed the following nine games, where on his return he scored Bayern Munich's first goal after six minutes of the game in a 1–1 draw to Borussia Dortmund on 7 April. He missed a large amount of the Champions League, he made his return where he was brought onto the field for Giovane Élber on 65 minutes in the second-leg quarter-final 2–1 win against Manchester United on 18 April. Due to injuries he was reduced to only 19 league appearances for the season, having scored five goals, as Bayern Munich claimed both the Bundesliga and the UEFA Champions League titles, where he was an un-used substitute during the final on 23 May. Santa Cruz finished the season with six goals in 28 matches.

==== 2001–02 season ====
Having already been overlooked by Bayern for striker Giovane Élber, the signing of striker Claudio Pizarro for the 2001–02 Bundesliga season would also limit his appearances, as Santa Cruz would regularly be substituted on to replace Pizarro or Élber. On 8 September, he scored his first goal of the 2001–02 season in round five, the second goal in a 2–0 away win to Borussia Dortmund. He played 79 minutes of the game before being substituted. On 23 October, he scored a brace in a 3–1 home win against Feyenoord during a 2001–02 Champions League group stage fixture as Bayern finished on top of Group H. He would be in the starting XI for the following two matches, where the second game saw him replaced after 42 minutes of the first half due to an injury. On 27 November, Bayern Munich defeated Boca Juniors 1–0 in the 2001 Intercontinental Cup, though he was not included in the squad. He returned to the first-team in a 5–1 away loss against Schalke 04 on 26 January, where he played the full 90 minutes. During the second group stage phase of the Champions League, he headed in a goal in the 81st minute from a Bixente Lizarazu cross in a 1–0 win against Boavista on 26 February. Bayern Munich were knocked out in the quarter-finals to Real Madrid as Santa Cruz made ten appearances in the competition. Santa Cruz finished the season with nine goals in 38 matches.

==== 2002–03 season ====
Santa Cruz made his first appearance of the 2002–03 season on matchday 9 in a 1–0 away win against Hansa Rostock, where he was substituted on to the field for Claudio Pizarro in the 76th minute. The striker scored his first goal of the 2002–03 Champions League in a 2–1 loss against Deportivo La Coruna on 29 October; he was substituted onto the field for Hasan Salihamidžić in the 46th minute and scored in the 77th minute. Bayern, however, finished bottom of their group with just two points. His first goal of the 2002–03 season came in a 2–1 home win against Borussia Dortmund on 9 November. One week later, he scored the only goal in a 1–0 win against VfL Wolfsburg on 16 November. In the following match, he scored Bayern Munich's second goal in a 2–0 win against 1. FC Kaiserslautern on 23 November. This was the first time that he had scored a goal in three consecutive games for Bayern Munich. Two weeks later, he scored a brace in a 3–0 away victory to VfB Stuttgart on 7 December. Due to injury, the Paraguayan was reduced to only 14 league appearances for the 2002–03 season as Bayern Munich finished on top of the 2002–03 Bundesliga table with 75 points. Bayern Munich defeated 1. FC Kaiserslautern 3–1 to claim the 2002–03 DFB-Pokal on 31 May, Santa Cruz was not included in the squad. Santa Cruz finished the season with eight goals in 19 matches.

==== 2003–04 season ====
Giovane Élber transferred to Lyon, but Bayern Munich signed Dutch striker Roy Makaay which provided more competition between Santa Cruz and Claudio Pizarro for the 2003–04 Bundesliga season. He made his first appearance of the 2003–04 in round five in a 3–2 loss to VfL Wolfsburg on 13 September 2003. One week later, he scored his first goal of the season in a 3–3 draw against Bayer Leverkusen on 20 September 2003. Santa Cruz scored his first goal of the 2003–04 UEFA Champions League in a 1–1 draw against Anderlecht on 30 September. Bayern Munich reached the knock-out stages where they were eliminated against Real Madrid. He had made 29 league appearances, having surpassed the number of appearances he made during his first-season before facing injury. Bayern Munich eventually finished second of the Bundesliga table with 68 points, six points shy of Werder Bremen. Santa Cruz finished the season with nine goals in 41 matches.

==== 2004–05 season ====
Prior to the start of the 2004–05 season, Santa Cruz played a full 90-minute in Bayern Munich's 3–2 2004 DFB-Ligapokal final win against Werder Bremen on 2 August. His first appearance of the 2004–05 season came in round 1 in a 2–0 away win against Hamburger SV, he was replaced by Mehmet Scholl in the 60th minute. He featured in the following two matches, although due to an injury sustained, he made his fourth and final league appearance for the 2004–05 season on matchday 34 in a 3–1 away win against VfB Stuttgart on 21 May 2005; he was substituted onto the field for Bastian Schweinsteiger in the 77th minute. He did not participate in the 2004–05 Champions League, where Bayern Munich were eliminated by Chelsea during the quarter-final stages.

Bayern were crowned champions of the 2004–05 Bundesliga season with 77 points, and qualified for the 2005–06 Champions League. The club also claimed the 2004–05 DFB-Pokal in a 2–1 win against Schalke 04 on 28 May 2005, although Santa Cruz did not take part in the match, where in his absence was striker Paolo Guerrero. Upon Santa Cruz's return from injury, he played the full 90 minutes of Bayern's 2–1 2005 DFL-Ligapokal semi-final defeat against VfB Stuttgart on 26 July. Santa Cruz finished the season with two goals in five matches for the reserve team and four matches for the first team.

==== 2005–06 season ====
Santa Cruz started in Bayern Munich's 3–0 home win against Borussia Mönchengladbach on the open day of the 2005–06 season on 5 August. He first appeared in the 2005–06 Champions League in a 1–0 home win against Club Brugge on 27 September, where he was substituted onto the field for Paolo Guerrero in the 72nd minute. He would make just one more appearance in the competition, as Bayern Munich were eliminated by Milan at the round of 16. He scored his first goal of the season on matchday 8 in a 2–0 home win against VfL Wolfsburg on 1 October. In the following match, he scored after 19 minutes in a 1–1 away draw against Schalke 04 on 15 October. In Bayern's 4–0 win against MSV Duisburg one week later, on 22 October, he scored his side's third goal in the 59th minute. He encountered an injury which reduced him to just 13 Bundesliga appearances for the season. During this period of injury recovery, he spent some time with Bayern Munich II in the Regionalliga Süd. He returned to the first-team on matchday 29 in a 3–0 away loss to Werder Bremen on 8 April, where he was substituted onto the field for Claudio Pizarro in the 80th minute.

Bayern claimed the 2005–06 DFB-Pokal when they defeated Eintracht Frankfurt 1–0 at the Olympic Stadium on 29 April, however Santa Cruz did not take part in the match. He scored his fourth and final goal of the 2005–06 season in a 3–1 home win against VfB Stuttgart on 3 May. During the 2006 DFL-Ligapokal, he featured in Bayern's 0–0 semi-final draw against Schalke 04 on 2 August, where he was substituted onto the field in the 77th minute for Lukas Podolski. Bayern eventually won the match 4–1 in a penalty shoot-out as he converted his side's third spot kick. Three days later, he played a full 90 minutes of the final where Bayern lost 2–0 against Werder Bremen on 5 August 2006. Bayern claimed the 2005–06 Bundesliga and qualified for the 2006–07 Champions League. Santa Cruz finished the season with three goals in 19 matches for the first team. He also made an appearance for the reserve team.

==== 2006–07 season ====
Santa Cruz made his first appearance in the 2006–07 Champions League in a 4–0 home win against Spartak Moscow on 12 September, where he scored Bayern's second goal with a right-footed shot in the 52nd minute. He scored his first goal of the 2006–07 season in a 3–0 away win against Energie Cottbus on 12 May. he finished the 2006–07 Bundesliga season with two goals in 26 league appearances, as Bayern finished in fourth position with 60 points. The club had also been eliminated in the third round of the 2006–07 DFB-Pokal. After eight years with Bayern, he stated to the club's director of football, Uli Hoeneß, that he needed a change of scenery and opted for a transfer to Real Betis, he also received offers to go to Italy and England. Bayern asked for an affordable price for him but at the time it was too high for Real Betis and he eventually signed for Blackburn Rovers in July 2007. Santa Cruz finished the season with four goals in 38 matches.

=== Blackburn Rovers ===
==== 2007–08 season ====
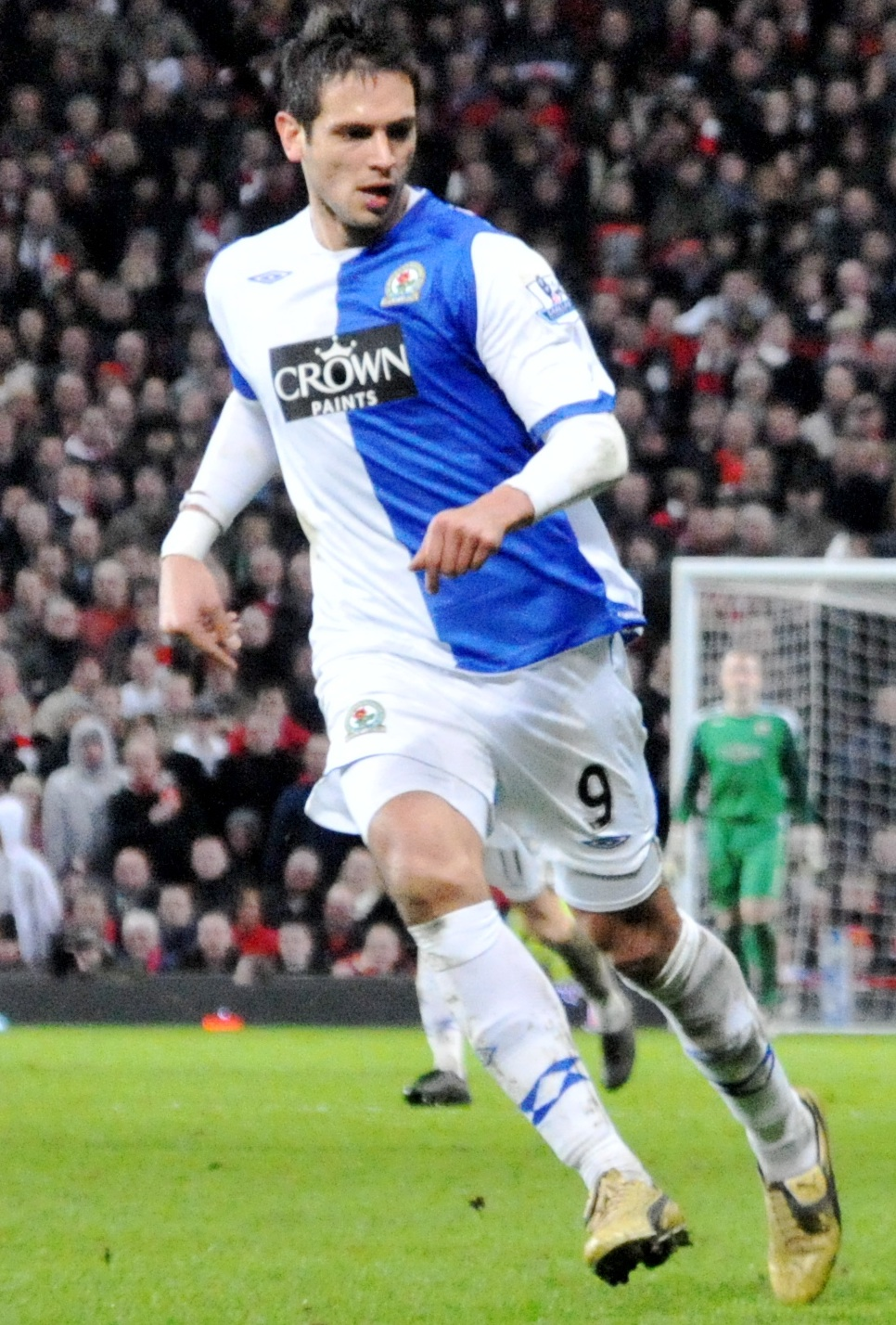
Santa Cruz during his first spell with Blackburn

Santa Cruz agreed to a four-year deal with Blackburn on 28 July 2007. The club agreed to pay Bayern Munich £3.5 million for the player, where he was presented with the number nine shirt. The striker made his debut in the 2007–08 Premier League on the opening day of the season in a 2–1 away win against Middlesbrough on 11 August, where he was substituted onto the field for the injured Benni McCarthy in the 60th minute and after just three touches of the ball scored an equaliser in the 63rd minute. Two weeks later, he scored for Blackburn after 16 minutes in a 1–1 draw against Everton on 25 August. He celebrated his 26th birthday and his first full Rovers start when he scored in a 1–0 away first-leg win against MYPA in the 2007–08 UEFA Cup qualifying rounds on 16 August. He scored his first hat-trick for Blackburn in a 5–3 loss to Wigan Athletic on 15 December, Blackburn had been losing 3–0 before he had brought the sides level with his three goals. This hat-trick meant that he became the first player in over ten years in English football to score a hat-trick for the losing side, since Dwight Yorke's hat-trick on 30 September 1996 for Aston Villa in their 4–3 away loss to Newcastle United.

During the 2007–08 League Cup, he scored a brace in a 3–2 loss against Arsenal. Two weeks later, he scored a brace in a 2–2 draw against Manchester City on 27 December. On 12 January 2008, he was named Premier League Player of the Month for December 2007. The Paraguayan scored a 90th minute consolation goal for Blackburn in their 3–1 away loss to Liverpool on 13 April. One week later, he scored in a 1–1 draw against Manchester United on 19 April.

In the following match, he went on to score in a 1–0 victory against Portsmouth and then two goals in a 3–1 win against Derby County which totalled to five goals in four consecutive matches. Santa Cruz finished the season with 19 goals in 37 league appearances, finishing as the league's fourth top goal-scorer behind Cristiano Ronaldo (31 goals), Fernando Torres (24 goals) and Emmanuel Adebayor (24 goals), as Blackburn claimed seventh spot on the 2007–08 Premier League table with 58 points. He was also voted as Blackburn's Player of the Season.

==== 2008–09 season ====
Following a successful 2007–08 campaign, there was much transfer speculation surrounding Santa Cruz at the start of the 2008–09 Premier League. However, he signed a four-year contract with Blackburn in August to end the speculation. Prior to the start of the 2008–09 season, Blackburn signed Roque's younger brother, Julio, who had arrived from Paraguayan Primera División side Cerro Porteño. He scored his first goal of the 2008–09 season in round 1 in a 3–2 away victory against Everton on 16 August. His second goal of the season came on 27 September in a 2–1 away win against Newcastle United. During the fourth round of the 2008–09 Football League Cup, he scored in Blackburn's 2–1 win against Sunderland on 12 November, he was substituted onto the field for Andy Haworth in the 62nd minute and scored in the 65th minute.

During an away fixture against Portsmouth in December 2008, Santa Cruz's front door was forced open and his house was raided by three men who held his wife, Giselle, at knifepoint to her throat. His children were forced into a downstairs room while the robbers searched the house upstairs with his wife as she was forced her to hand over thousands of pounds worth of jewellery. Santa Cruz's house was less than a mile from Liverpool winger Jermaine Pennant's mansion, which was attacked by ram-raiders the day before.

On 6 December, he scored in Blackburn's 3–1 loss against Liverpool. He became a target for Manchester City following their takeover by the billionaire Abu Dhabi United Group. In January 2009, they had bids of £12 million and £16 million rejected by Blackburn, with the club stating it would take £25 million for them to even consider selling their star striker. On 2 February 2009, City failed to meet the reported £25 million asking price. During the fifth round of the 2008–09 FA Cup, he scored within 90 seconds to give Blackburn the lead in their 2–2 draw against Coventry City on 14 February. He scored his fourth and final goal of the 2008–09 season in a 2–1 away loss against Manchester United on 21 February. On 20 April, there were rumours that he was planning to leave Rovers after the 2008–09 season, less than 12 months after signing a new deal with the Premier League club, although he denied these rumours, saying that they were "lost in translation". Blackburn finished on the season in 15th position of the Premier League table with 41 points; Santa Cruz scored just 4 goals in 20 league appearances.

=== Manchester City ===
==== 2009–10 season ====
On 21 June 2009, it was reported that Santa Cruz was undergoing a medical at Manchester City ahead of a proposed summer transfer worth £17.5 million on a four-year deal. Confirmation that the deal had been completed was released later that same day. The move to Manchester City reunited Santa Cruz with his former manager at Blackburn, Mark Hughes. Santa Cruz debuted for Manchester City in the 2009–10 Premier League season in a 3–1 home victory against West Ham United on 28 September, where he was substituted onto the field for Shaun Wright-Phillips in the 81st minute.

Santa Cruz scored his first goal for Manchester City in a 5–1 League Cup win against Scunthorpe United on 28 October. He scored his first league goals for Manchester City, a brace in a 4–3 home victory against Sunderland on 19 December, a game which proved to be Mark Hughes' last game at the club. Santa Cruz's appearances, however, were limited when Roberto Mancini took over as manager, due to a succession of injuries coupled with a lack of form. He scored his third and final league goal for the 2009–10 season in a 2–1 away victory against Fulham on 21 March. Santa Cruz had made only 19 league appearances as Manchester City finished the season in fifth position, where they qualified for the 2010–11 UEFA Europa League.

==== 2010–11 season ====
Roberto Mancini continued to leave out Santa Cruz during the 2010–11 season, and he made it clear that he wanted to leave. Mark Hughes, who by then was manager of Fulham, had insisted on signing him, but a transfer never materialized. From September 2010 to January 2011, he had made just one league appearance, a 0–0 draw against Birmingham City on 13 November where he had been substituted onto the field for James Milner in the 66th minute. He had also made one League Cup appearance in a 2–1 away loss to West Bromwich Albion on 22 September. In December, he received a loan offer from Serie A outfit Lazio for the remainder of the season, though it was rejected as he preferred a permanent move away from Eastlands.

==== Loan to Blackburn ====
On 14 January 2011, Santa Cruz returned to Blackburn on loan for the remainder of the 2010–11 season. After Santa Cruz passed his medical, he said, "When Blackburn showed an interest in me, it was very easy to decide," to BBC Radio Lancashire. His first game for Blackburn was in a 2–0 away loss against Chelsea at Stamford Bridge on 15 January, where he was substituted onto the field in the 46th minute for Nikola Kalinić. He made one appearance for Blackburn in a 3–1 FA Cup loss against Aston Villa on 29 January. He made nine appearances for Blackburn, as they finished in 15th position of the Premier League.

==== 2011–12 season ====
===== Loan to Real Betis =====
In August 2011, after being linked with moves to Leeds United and Celtic, Santa Cruz was loaned to Real Betis for the 2011–12 La Liga season after completing a medical on 27 August. He debuted for Betis in a 1–0 win against Mallorca on 10 September 2011, where he was substituted onto the field in the 75th minute for Jorge Molina. He scored his first goals for Betis, a brace, in a 4–3 win against Real Zaragoza on 22 September. He made his debut in the 2011–12 Copa del Rey in a 1–0 way loss against Córdoba on 13 December. His third league goal came in a 2–0 away win against Atlético Madrid, where he had been substituted onto the field for Beñat in the 72nd minute and scored his side's second goal in the 90th minute on 18 December.

In December, Brazilian Série A outfit Cruzeiro had made a bid for Santa Cruz and had also offered Manchester City their highly rated 17-year-old youngster, Léo Bonatini, as part of the deal. He admitted that he was aware of interest from Cruzeiro, but stated that the challenge of consolidating his club's position in La Liga was more important than moving on to pastures new. He scored his first goal of 2012 in a 2–0 home victory against Sporting de Gijón on 8 January. One week later, he was substituted onto the field for Ireney in the 46th minute at the Camp Nou in a 4–2 loss against Barcelona on 15 January, where he scored in the 52nd minute with a right-footed shot to level the scores at 2–2.

Having not scored for over two months, Santa Cruz scored his sixth league goal in a 1–1 home draw against Racing de Santander on 25 March. Several days later, it was reported that he had expressed his desire to remain at Betis for the next season, citing his love to the fans and the club. On 7 April, he scored his seventh league goal in a 3–1 home win against Villarreal. After notching seven league goals in 33 La Liga appearances, he announced his desire to stay with Betis after being deemed surplus to requirements at Manchester City.

===== Transfer speculation =====
On 17 June 2012, it was reported again that Mark Hughes, at that point managing Queens Park Rangers, was keen on signing Santa Cruz for the 2012–13 season. On 6 July 2012, it was reported that he was close to signing with Betis on a permanent deal but had hit problems due to his elevated wage demands. On 13 July 2012, it was reported that Argentine Primera División club Newell's Old Boys had expressed their interest in signing him after the club employed former Paraguay national team head coach Gerardo Martino as the first-team manager for the 2012–13 season. Martino stated that he would be the club's number 9 if they were to sign him. It was also reported that Colón and Santa Cruz's former club Olimpia Asunción were also chasing him. On 20 July, it had been reported that Santa Cruz was again linked with a move to QPR after he hinted that he could join up with ex-manager, Hughes. On 21 July, it was reported that he had admitted that he would prefer to join a team in the north-west of England as he sought an exit from Manchester City. On 31 July 2012, it was reported that Middlesbrough had failed in bid to sign Santa Cruz when it was understood that their offered deal had been swiftly rejected.

Santa Cruz had made surprise appearances for Manchester City during the club's pre-season tour and friendlies. On 31 July 2012, he scored in the 53rd minute of a 2–1 friendly loss against Oldham Athletic when he rounded goalkeeper Alex Cisak with ease and scored after a loose ball fell kindly. On 5 August 2012, he played 73 minutes in the city's 4–0 friendly victory over Limerick. On 10 August 2012, it was reported that Werder Bremen had been wheedled to within an inch of making a bid for him. It was also reported that he had had finally poised to agree deal with Bremen in order to leave Manchester City, and that according to Bremen's club general manager Klaus Allofs, they had been targeting a seasoned striker who can make a difference to their team.

==== 2012–13 season: Loan to Málaga ====
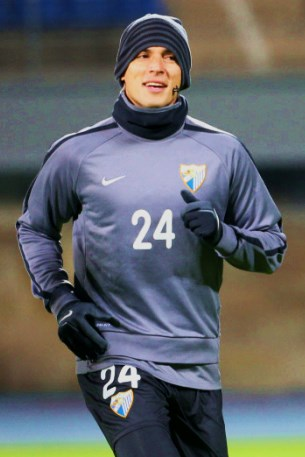
Santa Cruz training with Málaga in 2012

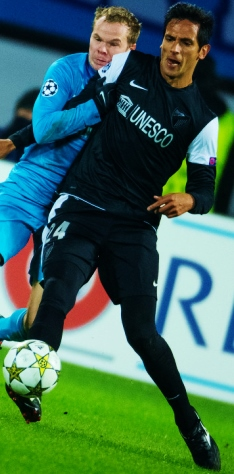
Santa Cruz during the 2012–13 UEFA Champions League against Zenit Saint Petersburg

On 31 August 2012, Santa Cruz returned to Spain and Andalusia, this time signing for Málaga on a season-long loan. Santa Cruz was reunited with Argentine centre back and good friend Martín Demichelis, with whom he had played with at Bayern Munich. His first league appearance for the 2012–13 season came in a 3–1 home victory against Levante on 16 September 2012. Wearing the number 24, Santa Cruz was substituted onto the field in the 69th minute for Javier Saviola. Two days later, Santa Cruz featured as a second-half substitute in Málaga's 3–0 Champions League home victory against Zenit Saint Petersburg on 18 September. The encounter was his first UEFA Champions League competition return following several seasons, since the 2006–07 edition with Bayern Munich.

On 7 October 2012, Santa Cruz scored his first league goal for Málaga in a 2–1 away defeat against Atlético Madrid. On 31 October, he scored a brace in a 4–3 away win against Cacereño in Malaga's first 2012–13 Copa del Rey fixture.

He scored his first league double in a 3–2 home victory against Real Madrid on 22 December 2012. Santa Cruz had entered the field in the 65th minute of the match for Javier Saviola and netted both goals in the 73rd and 76th minutes of the fixture. On 13 March 2013, Santa Cruz scored Málaga's second goal in their 2–0 Round of 16 UEFA Champions League home victory against Porto. His goal gave Málaga a 2–1 aggregate scores and sent the club directly into the quarter-finals of the competition, where they would face Borussia Dortmund and be eliminated. Santa Cruz had totaled eight league goals in 31 La Liga appearances as Málaga concluded in sixth position and qualified for the 2013–14 UEFA Europa League play-off round, however, the club was banned by UEFA from participating due to violations of UEFA Financial Fair Play Regulations.

=== Málaga ===
==== 2013–14 season ====
On 11 July 2013, it was confirmed that Santa Cruz would stay with Málaga on a permanent three-year contract. He was issued the number 9 shirt for the 2013–14 La Liga season following the departure of Javier Saviola. Santa Cruz affirmed that he was happy to be staying at the club and the factor of family stability came into his decision as he was able to leave his children enrolled in the same school. Santa Cruz first appearance of the season came in a 1–0 away defeat against Valencia on 17 August 2013.

Two weeks later, Santa Cruz scored his first league goal in a 2–2 away draw against Sevilla on 1 September 2013.

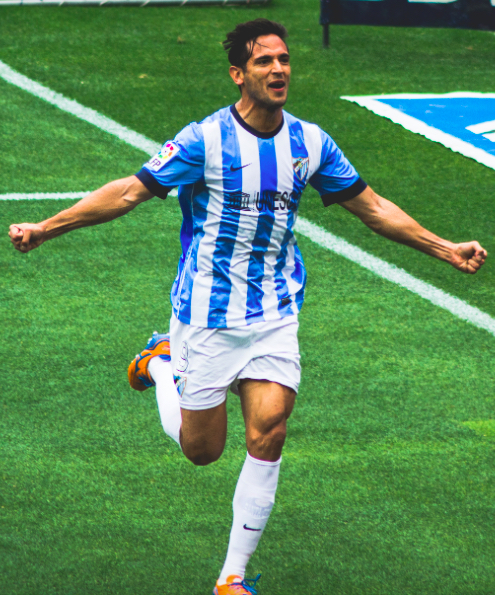
Santa Cruz during his second year with Málaga

His first appearance in the 2013–14 Copa del Rey was in a 3–3 home draw against Osasuna on 8 December 2013. Santa Cruz scored his last goal of the 2013–14 La Liga season in a 2–0 home victory against Villarreal on 21 April 2014. He scored Málaga's first goal in the sixth minute of the match. Santa Cruz concluded the season with six league goals as Málaga avoided relegation by six points.

==== 2014–15 season ====
Santa Cruz made his 2014–15 La Liga season debut in a 1–0 home victory against Athletic Bilbao on 23 August, playing in the entire 90 minutes of the fixture.

On 17 September 2014, it was announced that Santa Cruz would be one of Málaga's two team captains.

On 4 October, Santa Cruz scored his first goal of the 2014–15 season in a 2–1 home victory against Granada. He scored a double in a 4–1 home victory against Deportivo de La Coruña on 18 December 2014 in the 2014–15 Copa del Rey.

Santa Cruz played in his last match for Málaga on 21 December 2014 in a 2–1 away victory against Elche. The player was in the starting line-up and was substituted off of the field in the 51st minute for Nordin Amrabat. Concluding the fixture, Málaga club president Abdullah bin Nasser Al Thani used his Twitter account in order to say goodbye to the Paraguayan striker, saying, "Thank you very much Roque Santa Cruz. You will always be in our hearts. I wish you every success."

=== Cruz Azul ===
On 20 December 2014, it was revealed by Santa Cruz's agent, Aproniano Santa Cruz (his father), that the player would join Mexican club Cruz Azul for the 2015 Clausura. It was then confirmed that Santa Cruz would travel to Mexico on 22 December 2014 after playing his final league fixture for Malaga the day before, that the signing itself would cost around €2 million and Santa Cruz's agent assured that it would be a two-year contract. It was then reported by Paraguayan newspaper Última Hora that Santa Cruz would be highest paid player in the Liga MX, with a salary of more than US$200,000 per month and €2 million per year, earning higher than Ronaldinho earned at Querétaro. Cruz Azul doubled his previous annual salary of €900,000 per year. The transfer was officially completed on 29 December 2014.

On 10 January 2015, Santa Cruz debuted for Cruz Azul in the 2014–15 Liga MX season in a 1–0 away victory against Pachuca, being substituted off of the field after 82 minutes for Ismael Valadéz. One week after his debut, Santa Cruz was substituted off of the field after just 14 minutes of the first half in a 1–0 home victory against Santos Laguna on 17 January with reports that he had suffered muscle pain in the outer thigh. It was later reported that he would be sidelined for three weeks.

Upon his return, Santa Cruz scored his first league goal for Cruz Azul in a 2–1 home victory against Tijuana in March 2015. Three weeks later, he scored a double in a 2–0 home victory against Tigres UANL. He scored in the fourth minute of the match and then netted a penalty in the 14th minute to defeat the side who eventually finished in first place of the 2014–15 Clausura Championship. Before departing Cruz Azul, his last goal was in a 1–0 away victory against UNAM in early May 2015.

==== Loan to Málaga ====
On 26 August 2015, Santa Cruz returned to former club Málaga after agreeing to a one-year loan deal. On 3 December 2015, he scored in a 2–1 away loss against Mirandés in a Copa del Rey fixture. The game was his second since returning from injury and his first appearance in the squad's starting XI. On 12 December, Santa Cruz stated that his intention was to retire at Málaga.

Santa Cruz scored his first league goal of the season in a 1–1 away draw against Las Palmas on 10 January 2016. The fixture was his fourth league appearance and the first time he would be in the starting line-up for a league match. On 22 May 2016, Málaga-based newspaper Málaga Hoy reported that Santa Cruz was deciding whether to continue playing football or retire. The player's last appearance for the club had come on 24 April when he played just a few minutes at the Vicente Calderón Stadium against Atlético Madrid.

At the end of the club season, Santa Cruz had been removed from Paraguay's 2016 Copa América squad due to a knee problem; his loan with Málaga had concluded; and Mexican club Cruz Azul had communicated that Santa Cruz was not returning for the next season. Several days later, one of the directors of Santa Cruz's former club Olimpia, Ricardo Tavarelli (also the player's brother in-law), announced that he had spoken with Santa Cruz in relation to the player's possible return to the club.

=== Olimpia Asunción ===
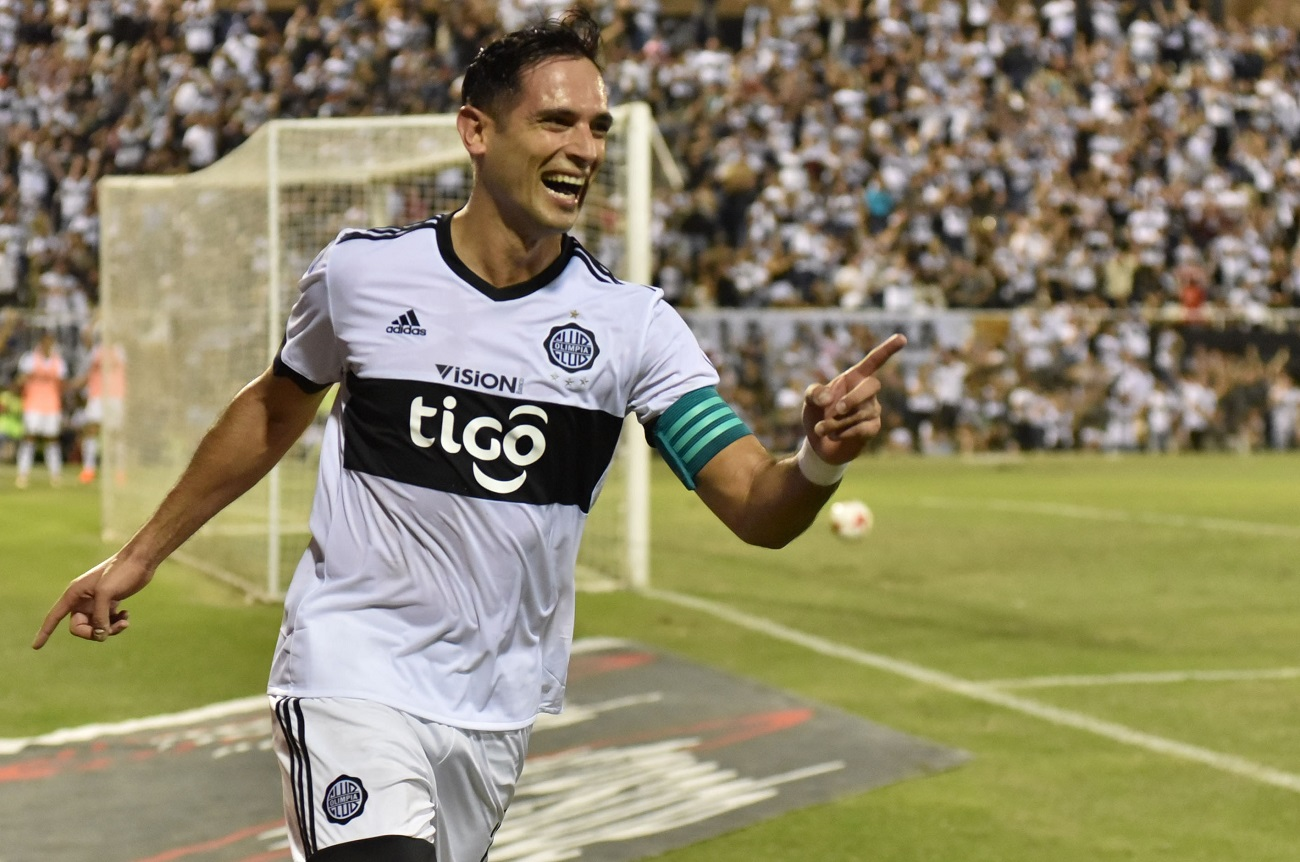
Santa Cruz with Olimpia Asunción in 2018

On 6 June 2016, Santa Cruz arrived in Paraguay for vacation and was greeted by many fans of Olimpia at the airport. He stated to the press that his "wish is to be at Olimpia, it's my house, I left from here".

On 8 June, it was officially confirmed that Santa Cruz had returned to the club after 17 years and would join his teammates for pre-season.

His "second" club debut came after entering the field in the second half of an international match, wearing the shirt number 24, against Boca Juniors on 23 June 2016. His league debut came in a 4–0 victory at home against Deportivo Capiatá on 30 July 2016. Santa Cruz was substituted onto the field in the second half for Fredy Bareiro in the 66th minute, assisting Julián Benítez in scoring his side's third goal two minutes later, then ultimately scoring a goal himself in the 90th minute.

The player then missed his side's next two league fixtures, including the Superclásico against Cerro Porteño, and upon returning he scored again in a 4–3 come back victory against Nacional on 20 August.

Santa Cruz was labelled 'Roque-Mania' by newspaper Versus, who described the 2018 and 2019 seasons as when his return to Olimpia Asunción reached its top, following four consecutive domestic titles under the coaching of Daniel Garnero.

Upon his departure from the club in 2021, Santa Cruz left Olimpia Asunción as its second-highest scorer behind Mauro Caballero, with 91 goals.

=== Libertad ===
In September 2021, a transfer for Santa Cruz to Libertad to be able to play the semi-finals of the Copa Sudamericana was announced, but the transfer attempt failed. On 27 December 2021, the 40-year-old Santa Cruz was officially revealed as Club Libertad's signing, announced through Twitter by the club. His signing was at the wish of Horacio Cartes. He joined until 31 December 2022. Before he departed Olimpia Asunción, who was in debt with him, Santa Cruz changed part of the debt payment into an investment of bonds. Following his signing, Santa Cruz was the subject of criticism by Olimpia Asunción fans. Within the first 24 hours of announcing Santa Cruz as Libertad's signing, he lost thousands of Social Media followers who were Olimpia Asunción fans. The transfer was officially complete in January of Paraguay's 2022 summer transfer window.

On 5 July 2022, Santa Cruz scored after an outstanding solo effort in the second leg of the Copa Libertadores round of 16 against Brazilian side Atletico Paranense, becoming, at the age of 40 years and 320 days, the oldest-ever player to score in the Copa Libertadores knock-out stage and the third oldest overall behind Óscar Aguirregaray and Zé Roberto. However, they were knocked out with an equalizer in stoppage time.

Two years later, on 7 May 2024, he scored the equalizer in a 1–1 draw with Deportivo Táchira in the 2024 Copa Libertadores group stage, becoming, at the age of 42 years and 265 days, the second-oldest goalscorer in the competition's history, only behind Zé Roberto, who was 57 days older when he scored in 2017, as well as the third-oldest goalscorer in international club tournaments in South America, only behind Roberto and Richard Pellejero, who scored a brace in the 2019 Copa Sudamericana, aged 43 years and 31 days. Having scored his first Copa Libertadores goals on 24 February 1999, he improved his record of longest span between goals in the Copa Libertadores to 25 years and 73 days, which is also a record in any international club competition worldwide. On 17 February 2025, Santa Cruz was honored by his club for surpassing 1,000 professional matches in his senior career, a milestone celebrated during a home fixture at Estadio Tigo La Huerta against Sportivo Ameliano. However, according to the IFFHS, he reached that milestone on 15 May 2025, during a 1–1 away draw against São Paulo in the Copa Libertadores.

=== Nacional ===
On 1 January 2026, at 44 years-old, Santa Cruz joined fellow Primera División club Nacional. Later that year, on 24 April, he scored his first goal for the club, an equalizing header in a 2–1 home victory over Recoleta, which was also his 100th goal in the Paraguayan Primera División.

== International career ==
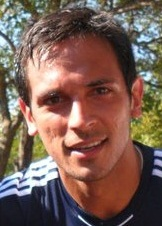
Santa Cruz with Paraguay in 2011

Since he already debuted in Paraguay's domestic league, national team coach Paulo César Carpegiani contemplated taking a then 16-year-old Santa Cruz to the 1998 FIFA World Cup in France. In 1999, Santa Cruz represented Paraguay's under-20 team before receiving a call up to the senior team when he made his debut aged 17 in a friendly match against Mexico on 28 April 1999. Santa Cruz scored his first goal for Paraguay in a 3–2 loss against Uruguay on 17 June 1999. He had scored a total of ten goals at international level for Paraguay (including U-20) in 1999. Due to his performances and involvement in three major tournaments of that same year (1999 South American Youth Championship, 1999 FIFA World Youth Championship and the 1999 Copa América), Santa Cruz was awarded as the Paraguayan Footballer of the Year by Diario ABC Color and the Paraguayan Football Association.

In 2000, Santa Cruz was selected to represent the under-23 at the 2000 CONMEBOL Men Pre-Olympic Tournament in Brazil, which saw Paraguay fail to qualify for the 2000 Summer Olympics. He appeared in four matches at the tournament, against Argentina, Uruguay, Bolivia, and Peru, scoring a double against the latter.

During the qualification campaign for the 2002 FIFA World Cup, Santa Cruz had scored a total of three goals. His first goal came in round nine, when Santa Cruz had scored Paraguay's first goal in the third minute of a 2–0 away victory against Colombia on 7 October 2000. His second goal came in a 5–1 home victory against Peru on 15 November 2000, and Santa Cruz scored his third goal of the 2002 World Cup qualification in a 5–1 home victory against Bolivia on 5 September 2001.

Prior to the World Cup, Santa Cruz scored his eighth international career goal in a 2–1 victory against Sweden in a friendly on 17 May 2002. Santa Cruz scored four goals during the qualification campaign for the 2006 World Cup. His first came in a 2–1 home victory against Ecuador on 15 November 2003, when Santa Cruz had given Paraguay a 1–0 lead in the 29th minute. Santa Cruz then scored Paraguay's only goal in their 4–1 away loss against Brazil on 5 June 2005. Three days later, Santa Cruz scored his third goal of the qualification campaign in a 4–1 home victory against Bolivia in Asunción on 8 June 2005. In round 16 of the qualification campaign, Santa Cruz scored in the 14th minute of the 1–0 home victory against Argentina in Asunción on 3 September 2005. His four goals during the qualification campaign brought him to a tally of 13 international goals for Paraguay.

Santa Cruz did not score his next international goal until two years later, Paraguay's only goal in their 2–1 away victory against Mexico at the Estadio Universitario in Monterrey on 25 March 2007. During the qualification campaign for the 2010 World Cup, Santa Cruz had scored three goals for Paraguay. His first goal came in the 50th minute of a 5–1 home victory against Ecuador on 17 November 2007, Santa Cruz had dribbled into the 18-yard box and scored with a right-footed shot. On 15 June 2008, Santa Cruz scored Paraguay's first goal in their 2–0 home victory against Brazil in Asunción, hitting a far-post tap-in, side footing the ball into the net after receiving it from a corner. Then, in the 49th minute, he received a through ball from Nelson Valdez and dribbled towards the goal to attempt a shot on goal. His shot was initially saved by Brazil goalkeeper Júlio César, but fell into the path of Salvador Cabañas who would score Paraguay's second goal. He scored his 24th international goal for Paraguay with a header in a 2–0 home victory in Asunción against Romania on 11 June 2011, a preparation match for the 2011 Copa América. On 7 June 2013, Santa Cruz scored in a 2–1 home defeat against Chile during a 2014 World Cup qualifier. The goal brought his tally to 26 which made him the all-time leading goal scorer of the Paraguay national team's history. Santa Cruz went on to score two more goals (against Bolivia and Argentina) during the 2014 World Cup qualifiers, and also served as the national team captain for the last four fixtures of the campaign. On 18 November 2014, Santa Cruz scored in a 2–1 away friendly defeat against Peru in Lima, which took his tally to 30 goals for the national team.

=== 1999 South American Youth Championship ===
Santa Cruz was named in the 20-man squad for Paraguay's 1999 South American Youth Championship in Argentina in January. Santa Cruz scored in Paraguay's first match against Bolivia, levelling the scores at 1–1 in the 69th minute as Paraguay went on to win 2–1 on 8 January. In Paraguay's second game against Brazil, Santa Cruz scored in the first minute of the match which ultimately ended in a 1–1 draw on 10 January. Paraguay finished in first place of their respective group with 10 points, qualifying for the second round of the tournament. In Paraguay's third match of the second ground, Santa Cruz scored in the 66th minute of Paraguay's 3–2 victory against Chile on 21 January. Paraguay finished in fourth place of the second round group stage with eight points and subsequently qualified for the 1999 FIFA World Youth Championship.

=== 1999 FIFA World Youth Championship ===
Santa Cruz was selected by coach Mario Jacquet for the 18-man Paraguay U-20 squad for the 1999 FIFA World Youth Championship in April. Santa Cruz was handed the number 9 shirt. He played a full 90 minutes in Paraguay's group stage opener, a 4–0 loss against Germany on 4 April. In Paraguay's second group stage match, Santa Cruz scored in the 26th minute of Paraguay's 3–1 victory against Costa Rica on 7 April. He was substituted off of the field in the 75th minute for Sergio Fernández. Santa Cruz then played 80 minutes of Paraguay's last group stage match, a 2–1 victory against Nigeria on 10 April. Paraguay had obtained six points out of three games, they finished in first place of their respective group and advanced to the round of 16 knockout stages. Paraguay were drawn against Uruguay, where they were losing 2–0 before Santa Cruz scored a 62nd-minute penalty goal. He then scored for Paraguay in the 86th minute to level the scores at 2–2. The match was then decided via penalty shoot-out, where Santa Cruz had scored Paraguay's first penalty. After ten penalty shots had been taken, Santa Cruz took his second penalty shot which was missed. Uruguay subsequently won the penalty shoot-out 10–9.

=== 1999 Copa América ===
Santa Cruz performances in Paraguay's national youth teams led to a call-up to by national team coach Ever Almeida for the 1999 Copa América held in Paraguay. In Paraguay's second group stage match, Santa Cruz scored a double against tournament invitees Japan on 2 July. Santa Cruz had scored a goal in each half, one goal in the 40th minute of the first half and the other goal in the 86th minute of the second half. Three days later, Santa Cruz scored the only goal for Paraguay in their 1–0 win against Peru on 5 July. Santa Cruz had scored in the 88th minute of the match. Paraguay had finished in first place of their respective group, with seven points, and advanced to the quarter-final stages of the tournament. Paraguay would face Uruguay on 10 July at the Defensores del Chaco in Asunción, where Uruguay won 5–3 via penalty shoot-out having drawn 1–1 in regulation time.

=== 2002 FIFA World Cup ===
Santa Cruz was included in Cesare Maldini's 23-man squad for the 2002 World Cup in South Korea and Japan, where he was handed the number 9 shirt. Santa Cruz started in Paraguay's first group stage match against South Africa on 2 June. He scored in the 39th minute, giving Paraguay a 1–0 first half lead, when he latched onto the end of a free-kick by Francisco Arce and headed the ball into the left side of the net. Santa Cruz played a full 90 minutes of the 2–2 draw. He again started in Paraguay's second group stage match against Spain on 7 June. He again played a full 90 minutes of the 3–1 loss and was yellow carded in the 80th minute. On 12 June, Santa Cruz played a full 90 minutes of Paraguay's 3–1 victory against Slovenia. Paraguay finished in second position of their respective with four points, advancing to the round of 16 where they faced Germany on 15 June. Santa Cruz had again started the match as part of the squad's starting XI, however, he was substituted off of the field for Jorge Campos in the 29th minute due to injury in the eventual 1–0 defeat.

==== Incident with José Luís Chilavert ====
On 10 June 2013, it was reported that José Luís Chilavert had stated that Santa Cruz had pretended to be injured in order to miss the match against Germany at the round of 16 stage of the 2002 World Cup. Chilavert claimed that this was because Karl-Heinz Rummenigge, who at the time was vice president of Bayern Munich (which was the club were Santa Cruz had played at from 1999 to 2007), had visited the hotel that Paraguay were staying at and had apparently told Santa Cruz not to play against Germany.

Francisco Arce defended Santa Cruz, informing that "Chilavert comes out to say stupid things every now and then. Don't believe him. Roque is the most professional person that I have ever met in my time in the national team, he is a man that doesn't have a stain in any place".

Prior to the match in 2002, the media stated that the match would have special significance for Santa Cruz due to playing for a German club. Prior to the match, Santa Cruz said, "I'm very excited – I have been dreaming of this. If I have a chance I will kill them – I know all their tricks. It will be a special game for me against my friends and colleagues from Bayern Munich, but I don't take it as a personal challenge. I have been living there for three years and I like the country very much, but I think they will understand that I must do my best and I won't need motivating. Germany are a powerful team, with players of the highest calibre, and their name is written into World Cup history," and in 2013 Santa Cruz himself then stated to Paraguay's Telefuturo that Chilavert's comments were false because they were stated more than ten years after the incident. Santa Cruz also stated that what had been said was painful because alongside Chilavert he had shared many experiences but the people had seen Santa Cruz play and were aware of his professionalism.

=== 2006 FIFA World Cup ===
Santa Cruz was in doubt for the 2006 World Cup as he had been recovering from a knee injury, however, he recovered in time for the start of the tournament and was eventually selected in the 23-man squad by coach Aníbal Ruiz. Despite wearing the number 24 shirt during the World Cup qualification campaign, he was handed the number 9 for the tournament. Santa Cruz was part of the starting XI players in Paraguay's first match against England on 10 June. He was partnered upfront alongside Nelson Valdez in the eventual 1–0 loss. Santa Cruz again started in Paraguay's 1–0 loss to Sweden on 15 June, where he was substituted off of the field for Dante López in the 63rd minute. Santa Cruz played a full 90 minutes of Paraguay's third group stage match against Trinidad and Tobago on 20 June, he had assisted Nelson Cuevas with a pass in scoring Paraguay's second goal in the 86th minute of the 2–0 victory. Paraguay finished in third position of their respective group, obtaining three points for their win against Trinidad and Tobago.

=== 2007 Copa América ===
Santa Cruz was selected for the 2007 Copa América under new coach Gerardo Martino. In Paraguay's first group stage match against Colombia on 28 June, Santa Cruz scored a hat-trick in his side's 5–0 victory. His first goal was a left-footed chip in the 30th minute, his second goal was a right-footed shot in the 46th minute assisted from an Édgar Barreto pass, and his third goal was a header in the 80th minute assisted from a cross by Carlos Bonet. Santa Cruz played a full 90 minutes of Paraguay's 3–1 victory against the United States on 2 July. Santa Cruz was substituted onto the field for Jonathan Santana in the 81st minute of Paraguay's last group stage fixture, a 1–0 loss against Argentina on 5 July. Paraguay had finished in second place of their respective group, having obtained six points from their two wins. They advanced to the quarter final stages where they faced Mexico on 8 July, where Santa Cruz played a full 90 minutes of Paraguay's 6–0 loss.

=== 2010 FIFA World Cup ===
Santa Cruz scored three times during qualification for the 2010 World Cup, including the opening goal of a 2–0 defeat of Brazil in Asunción, as La Albirroja finished third in the CONMEBOL standings.

Despite injury restricting him to a substitute appearance in the team's opening match of the tournament finals against champions Italy, Santa Cruz went on to start in Paraguay's second and third Group F matches, as well as the round of 16 defeat of Japan in Pretoria. This result took Paraguay to its first ever World Cup quarter-final, where the team lost 0–1 to eventual champions Spain, with Santa Cruz appearing as a 72nd-minute substitute.

=== 2011 Copa América ===
Santa Cruz was part of Paraguay's starting eleven players for the 2011 Copa América. On 3 July, he played in Paraguay's opening group stage fixture, a 0–0 draw against Ecuador. He played 83 minutes of the match before being substituted off of the field for Pablo Zeballos. In Paraguay's second group stage fixture on 9 July, Santa Cruz Paraguay's first goal in the 54th minute of their 2–2 draw against Brazil in Córdoba. Santa Cruz was awarded as the Man of the Match of the 2–2 draw. His goal brought him to a total of 25 goals for Paraguay, making him the joint all-time leading goal scorer of the Paraguay national team's history, with José Saturnino Cardozo.

On 13 July, Santa Cruz played just 39 minutes of Paraguay's last group stage match against Venezuela before being replaced by Nelson Valdez. The match finished as a 3–3 draw and Paraguay finished in third place of their respective group, with three points, qualifying for the quarter finals stages. On 17 July, Santa Cruz would not take part in Paraguay's quarter final match against Brazil. Paraguay eventually beat Brazil 2–0 via penalty shoot-out and qualified for the semi-final. In Paraguay's semi-final victory against Venezuela on 20 July, Santa Cruz was substituted onto the field in the 73rd minute for Nelson Valdez, however due to an injury, he was substituted off of the field in the 80th minute for Osvaldo Martínez. Paraguay had beat Venezuela 5–3 via penalty shoot-out and qualified for the final where they faced Uruguay at the Estadio Monumental Antonio Vespucio Liberti in Buenos Aires on 24 July. Santa Cruz did not take part in the final, where which Paraguay were beaten 3–0 and finished runners-up.

=== 2014 FIFA World Cup qualification ===
On 7 June 2013, in a 2014 World Cup qualification match against Chile, Santa Cruz scored his 26th international goal and became the leading goalscorer for Paraguay. Nevertheless, Paraguay did not qualify for the World Cup.

=== 2015 Copa América and late career ===
Santa Cruz captained Paraguay in their 2015 Copa América fourth-place campaign, making five appearances, four of which as a starter, scoring no goals. He was also called up for the Copa América Centenario on the following year, but missed out on the tournament through injury. In May 2019, he was named in the preliminary 40-man squad for the 2019 Copa América, but did not make the final cut. As of 2023, his latest appearance for the national team has been in a 2018 World Cup qualifier against Peru on 11 November 2016.

== Style of play ==
Santa Cruz was described in his 2010 World Cup profile as having "long caused problems for opposing defences with his natural flair for goalscoring and surging runs into the penalty box".

== Personal life ==
Santa Cruz, who is a naturalised Spanish citizen, married Giselle Tavarelli, the sister of his former national team and Olimpia teammate Ricardo Tavarelli, in 2003. They have a son named Tobías (born 17 December 2003), a daughter named Fiorella (born 11 November 2005), a son named Benjamín (born 2010) and a daughter named Alaia (born in Spain in July 2014). Santa Cruz is a practising Roman Catholic.

His father, Aproniano Santa Cruz, is also his agent, and his mother is Celina. Santa Cruz has a younger brother named Julio who played for Asunción-based club Nacional, a second brother named Diego who was also a professional football player, and another brother named Oscar who died in 2005.

Santa Cruz is a friend of long-time Bayern Munich teammate Owen Hargreaves, who taught him the English language. Hargreaves and Santa Cruz lived nearby to each other in the city of Manchester while Santa Cruz was playing for Blackburn in 2007.

In 2004, Santa Cruz was the subject of the song "Ich, Roque" by the German band Sportfreunde Stiller.

Santa Cruz was chosen by the German newspaper Die Welt as the sexiest footballer of the 2006 World Cup. He has appeared on the cover of the German version of Pro Evolution Soccer 6.

== Career statistics ==
=== Club ===
As of match played 7 October 2026

Appearances and goals by club, season and competition
Club	Season	League			National cup (Note: Includes DFB-Pokal, FA Cup, Copa del Rey, Copa Paraguay)		League cup (Note: Includes DFL-Ligapokal, Football League Cup)		Continental		Other		Total	
Club	Season	Division	Apps	Goals	Apps	Goals	Apps	Goals	Apps	Goals	Apps	Goals	Apps	Goals
Olimpia Asunción	1997	Paraguayan Primera División	1	0	—		—		0	0	—		1	0
Olimpia Asunción	1998	Paraguayan Primera División	9	3	—		—		8 (Note: Appearances in Copa Mercosur)	4	—		17	7
Olimpia Asunción	1999	Paraguayan Primera División	14	4	—		—		5 (Note: Appearances in Copa Libertadores)	2	—		19	6
Olimpia Asunción	Total		24	7	—		—		13	6	—		37	13
Bayern Munich	1999–2000	Bundesliga	28	5	5	3	0	0	15 (Note: Appearances in UEFA Champions League)	1	—		48	9
Bayern Munich	2000–01	Bundesliga	19	5	1	0	2	1	6	0	—		28	6
Bayern Munich	2001–02	Bundesliga	22	5	3	1	1	0	11	3	1 (Note: Appearance in UEFA Super Cup)	0	38	9
Bayern Munich	2002–03	Bundesliga	14	5	3	2	0	0	2	1	—		19	8
Bayern Munich	2003–04	Bundesliga	29	5	4	4	0	0	8	0	—		41	9
Bayern Munich	2004–05	Bundesliga	4	0	1	4	2	1	0	0	—		7	5
Bayern Munich	2005–06	Bundesliga	13	4	3	0	1	0	2	0	—		19	4
Bayern Munich	2006–07	Bundesliga	26	2	3	0	2	1	7	1	—		38	4
Bayern Munich	Total		155	31	23	14	8	3	51	6	1	0	238	54
Bayern Munich II	2004–05	Regionalliga Süd	5	2	—		—		—		—		5	2
Bayern Munich II	2005–06	Regionalliga Süd	1	0	—		—		—		—		1	0
Bayern Munich II	Total		6	2	—		—		—		—		6	2
Blackburn Rovers	2007–08	Premier League	37	19	0	0	3	3	3 (Note: Appearances in UEFA Cup)	1	—		43	23
Blackburn Rovers	2008–09	Premier League	20	4	4	1	3	1	—		—		27	6
Blackburn Rovers	Total		57	23	4	1	6	4	3	1	—		70	29
Manchester City	2009–10	Premier League	19	3	2	0	1	1	—		—		22	4
Manchester City	2010–11	Premier League	1	0	0	0	1	0	—		—		2	0
Manchester City	Total		20	3	2	0	2	1	—		—		24	4
Blackburn Rovers (loan)	2010–11	Premier League	9	0	1	0	—		—		—		10	0
Real Betis (loan)	2011–12	La Liga	33	7	2	0	—		—		—		35	7
Málaga	2012–13	La Liga	31	8	4	3	—		10	1	—		45	12
Málaga	2013–14	La Liga	31	6	1	0	—		—		—		32	6
Málaga	2014–15	La Liga	12	3	1	2	—		—		—		13	5
Málaga	Total		74	17	6	5	—		10	1	—		90	23
Cruz Azul	2014–15	Liga MX	10	4	—		—		—		—		10	4
Málaga (loan)	2015–16	La Liga	17	2	2	1	—		—		—		19	3
Olimpia Asunción	2016	Paraguayan Primera División	16	5	—		—		—		—		16	5
Olimpia Asunción	2017	Paraguayan Primera División	26	3	—		—		6 (Note: Appearances in Copa Sudamericana)	1	—		32	4
Olimpia Asunción	2018	Paraguayan Primera División	34	13	5	4	—		4	1	—		43	18
Olimpia Asunción	2019	Paraguayan Primera División	34	26	0	0	—		8	2	—		42	28
Olimpia Asunción	2020	Paraguayan Primera División	27	17	—		—		5	0	—		32	17
Olimpia Asunción	2021	Paraguayan Primera División	25	4	5	1	—		6	1	1 (Note: Appearance(s) in Supercopa Paraguay)	1	37	7
Olimpia Asunción	Total		162	68	10	5	—		29	5	1	1	202	79
Club Libertad	2022	Paraguayan Primera División	39	12	2	1	—		4	2	—		45	15
Club Libertad	2023	Paraguayan Primera División	37	3	5	0	—		6 (Note: Four appearances in Copa Libertadores, two appearances in Copa Sudamericana)	0	—		48	3
Club Libertad	2024	Paraguayan Primera División	30	4	5	2	—		9 (Note: Four appearances and one goal in Copa Libertadores, five appearances and one goal in Copa Sudamericana)	2	—		44	8
Club Libertad	2025	Paraguayan Primera División	26	4	1	0	—		6	0	1	1	34	5
Club Libertad	Total		132	23	13	3	—		25	4	1	1	171	31
Nacional	2026	Paraguayan Primera División	20	5	0	0	—		1	0	—		21	5
Career total			719	192	63	29	16	8	132	23	3	2	933	254

=== International ===
Appearances and goals by national team and year
National team	Year	Apps	Goals
Paraguay	1999	8	4
Paraguay	2000	9	2
Paraguay	2001	4	1
Paraguay	2002	7	2
Paraguay	2003	5	1
Paraguay	2004	4	0
Paraguay	2005	5	3
Paraguay	2006	3	0
Paraguay	2007	12	5
Paraguay	2008	7	2
Paraguay	2009	2	0
Paraguay	2010	13	3
Paraguay	2011	10	2
Paraguay	2012	2	0
Paraguay	2013	6	3
Paraguay	2014	7	2
Paraguay	2015	6	2
Paraguay	2016	2	0
Total		112	32

Scores and results list Paraguay's goal tally first.

List of international goals scored by Roque Santa Cruz
No.	Date	Venue	Opponent	Score	Result	Competition
1.	17 June 1999	Estadio Antonio Oddone Sarubbi, Ciudad del Este, Paraguay	Uruguay	1–3	2–3	Friendly
2.	2 July 1999	Estadio Defensores del Chaco, Asunción, Paraguay	Japan	2–0	4–0	1999 Copa América
3.	2 July 1999	Estadio Defensores del Chaco, Asunción, Paraguay	Japan	4–0	4–0	1999 Copa América
4.	5 July 1999	Monumental Río Parapití, Pedro Juan Caballero, Paraguay	Peru	1–0	1–0	1999 Copa América
5.	7 October 2000	Estadio El Campín, Bogotá, Colombia	Colombia	1–0	2–0	2002 FIFA World Cup qualification
6.	15 November 2000	Estadio Defensores del Chaco, Asunción, Paraguay	Peru	1–0	5–1	2002 FIFA World Cup qualification
7.	5 September 2001	Estadio Defensores del Chaco, Asunción, Paraguay	Bolivia	4–1	5–1	2002 FIFA World Cup qualification
8.	17 May 2002	Råsunda Stadium, Stockholm, Sweden	Sweden	1–0	2–1	Friendly
9.	2 June 2002	Busan Asiad Main Stadium, Busan, South Korea	South Africa	1–0	2–2	2002 FIFA World Cup
10.	15 November 2003	Estadio Defensores del Chaco, Asunción, Paraguay	Ecuador	1–0	2–1	2006 FIFA World Cup qualification
11.	5 June 2005	Estádio Beira-Rio, Porto Alegre, Brazil	Brazil	1–3	1–4	2006 FIFA World Cup qualification
12.	8 June 2005	Estadio Defensores del Chaco, Asunción, Paraguay	Bolivia	2–1	4–1	2006 FIFA World Cup qualification
13.	3 September 2005	Estadio Defensores del Chaco, Asunción, Paraguay	Argentina	1–0	1–0	2006 FIFA World Cup qualification
14.	25 March 2007	Estadio Universitario, Monterrey, Mexico	Mexico	1–2	1–2	Friendly
15.	28 June 2007	Estadio José Pachencho Romero, Maracaibo, Venezuela	Colombia	1–0	5–0	2007 Copa América
16.	28 June 2007	Estadio José Pachencho Romero, Maracaibo, Venezuela	Colombia	2–0	5–0	2007 Copa América
17.	28 June 2007	Estadio José Pachencho Romero, Maracaibo, Venezuela	Colombia	3–0	5–0	2007 Copa América
18.	17 November 2007	Estadio Defensores del Chaco, Asunción, Paraguay	Ecuador	3–0	5–1	2010 FIFA World Cup qualification
19.	15 June 2008	Estadio Defensores del Chaco, Asunción, Paraguay	Brazil	1–0	2–0	2010 FIFA World Cup qualification
20.	18 June 2008	Estadio Hernando Siles, La Paz, Bolivia	Bolivia	1–2	2–4	2010 FIFA World Cup qualification
21.	15 May 2010	Centre sportif de Colovray Nyon, Nyon, Switzerland	North Korea	1–0	1–0	Friendly
22.	17 November 2010	Hong Kong Stadium, Victoria, Hong Kong	Hong Kong	1–0	7–0	Friendly
23.	17 November 2010	Hong Kong Stadium, Victoria, Hong Kong	Hong Kong	3–0	7–0	Friendly
24.	11 June 2011	Estadio Defensores del Chaco, Asunción, Paraguay	Romania	2–0	2–0	Friendly
25.	9 July 2011	Estadio Mario Alberto Kempes, Córdoba, Argentina	Brazil	1–1	2–2	2011 Copa América
26.	7 June 2013	Estadio Defensores del Chaco, Asunción, Paraguay	Chile	1–2	1–2	2014 FIFA World Cup qualification
27.	6 September 2013	Estadio Defensores del Chaco, Asunción, Paraguay	Bolivia	2–0	4–0	2014 FIFA World Cup qualification
28.	10 September 2013	Estadio Defensores del Chaco, Asunción, Paraguay	Argentina	2–4	2–5	2014 FIFA World Cup qualification
29.	29 May 2014	Kufstein Arena, Kufstein, Austria	Cameroon	2–0	2–1	Friendly
30.	18 November 2014	Estadio Nacional, Lima, Peru	Peru	1–0	1–2	Friendly
31.	6 June 2015	Estadio Manuel Ferreira, Asunción, Paraguay	Honduras	1–1	2–2	Friendly
32.	6 June 2015	Estadio Manuel Ferreira, Asunción, Paraguay	Honduras	2–2	2–2	Friendly

== Honours ==
Olimpia Asunción

- Paraguayan Primera División: 1997, 1998, 1999, 2018 Apertura, 2018 Clausura, 2019 Apertura, 2019 Clausura, 2020 Clausura
- Copa Paraguay: 2021
- Supercopa Paraguay: 2021

Bayern Munich

- Bundesliga: 1999–2000, 2000–01, 2002–03, 2004–05, 2005–06
- DFB-Pokal: 1999–2000, 2002–03, 2004–05, 2005–06
- DFB-Ligapokal: 2000, 2004
- UEFA Champions League: 2000–01
- Intercontinental Cup: 2001

Libertad

- Paraguayan Primera División: 2022 Apertura, 2023 Apertura, 2023 Clausura, 2024 Apertura, 2025 Apertura
- Copa Paraguay: 2023, 2024
- Supercopa Paraguay: 2023, 2024

Paraguay

- Copa América runner-up: 2011

Individual

- Paraguayan Footballer of the Year: 1999, 2018
- FIFA World Cup Most Handsome Player: 2006
- Premier League Player of the Month: December 2007
- Blackburn Rovers Player of the Season: 2007–08
- Pope Francis International Peace Match Invitation: 2014
- Copa Paraguay Top Scorer: 2018
- Paraguayan Primera División Apertura Top Scorer: 2019
- Paraguayan Primera División Clausura Top Scorer: 2019

Decorations

- Special decoration by the Presidency of the Republic: 2010
- Domingo Martínez de Irala Medal by the Municipality of Asunción: 2010

Records

- One of the Players in the World who have Scored Goals in Four Different Decades

== See also ==
- List of men's footballers with 1,000 or more official appearances
- List of top international men's football goalscorers by country
- List of men's footballers with 100 or more international caps
- Players and Records in Paraguayan Football
