= Félix Torres (footballer, born 1964) =

Paraguayan footballer and coach

Personal information
- Full name: Félix Ricardo Torres Rodríguez
- Date of birth: 28 April 1964 (age 62)
- Place of birth: Asunción, Paraguay
- Height: 1.84 m (6 ft 0 in)
- Position: Striker

Senior career*
Years	Team	Apps	(Gls)
1981–1983	Nacional		
1982	→ Sol de América (loan)		
1983–1984	Hércules	24	(7)
1984	→ Lorca Deportiva (loan)	5	(0)
1985	Nacional		
1986–1987	Sol de América		
1987–1988	Tigres UANL		
1988–1989	Sol de América		
1989–1991	Deportivo Mandiyú	91	(28)
1992	Estudiantes	18	(7)
1992	Racing Club	8	(0)
1993	Olimpia		
1993	Platense	7	(1)
1994–1995	Deportivo Morón		
1995	Deportes La Serena	21	(4)
1997–2001	Olimpia		
2002	Nacional		

International career
- Paraguay

Managerial career
- 2005: Sol de América
- 2007: Olimpia
- 2010: Deportivo Capiatá
- * Club domestic league appearances and goals

Félix Ricardo Torres Rodríguez (born 28 April 1964) is a former football striker and coach from Paraguay.

== Career ==
Torres started his career in Nacional of Paraguay where he made his professional debut in 1981. In 1983, he was signed by Hércules CF where he played two seasons before returning to Paraguay to play for Nacional and Sol de América where he became one of the key players in the obtention of the 1986 Paraguayan 1st division by being the team topscorer and overall topscorer of that year in Paraguay. He then played for Tigres UANL of Mexico before playing in Argentina for clubs like Deportivo Mandiyú, Estudiantes de La Plata, Racing Club and Platense. Torres also played for Deportes La Serena of Chile and returned to Paraguay to play for Olimpia where he won three 1st division titles before retiring.

Torres also played for the Paraguay national football team during the 1998 FIFA World Cup qualifiers.

== Personal life ==
Torres is nicknamed Tanque (Tank) due to his strong build.

== Titles ==
Season	Team	Title
1986	Sol de América	Paraguayan 1st division
1998	Olimpia	Paraguayan 1st division
1999	Olimpia	Paraguayan 1st division
2000	Olimpia	Paraguayan 1st division

== Awards ==
Season	Team	Award
1986	Sol de América	Top scorer of Liga Paraguaya (13 goals)
