= Carlos Guirland =

Paraguayan footballer (born 1961)

Personal information
- Full name: Carlos Alberto Guirland Báez
- Date of birth: 18 September 1968 (age 58)
- Place of birth: San Ignacio, Paraguay
- Height: 1.75 m (5 ft 9 in)
- Position: Midfielder

Senior career*
Years	Team	Apps	(Gls)
1986–1992	Olimpia		
1992–1993	Deportivo Mandiyú	20	(0)
1993–1994	San Martín Tucumán		
1994	Olimpia	8	(0)
1995	Sol de América		
1995–1996	Atlético Tucumán		
1996–1997	Chacarita Juniors		
1997–1998	Audax Italiano	38	(15)
1999	Deportes La Serena	29	(4)
2000	Universal		

International career
1989–1991	Paraguay	10	(1)
- * Club domestic league appearances and goals

Carlos Alberto Guirland Báez (born 18 September 1968) is a retired association football midfielder from Paraguay. He played professional football in Paraguay, Chile and Argentina during his career.

== Club career ==
Born in Misiones Province, Guirland came to Olimpia at the age of 17 and started his professional career with them in 1986. He had spells playing in Argentina and Chile with Deportivo Mandiyú, San Martín de Tucumán, Atlético Tucumán, Chacarita Juniors, Audax Italiano and Deportes La Serena. Guirland was a member of the La Serena squad which finished last in the 1999 Chilean Primera División and was relegated.

== International career ==
Guirland made his international debut for the Paraguay national team on 15 March 1989 in a friendly match against Martinique (2–0 win). He obtained a total number of ten international caps, scoring one goal for the national side.
