= Tomás Bartomeus =

Paraguayan footballer (born 1982)

Personal information
- Full name: Tomás Javier Bartoméus Viveros
- Date of birth: 27 October 1982 (age 44)
- Place of birth: Cambyretá, Paraguay
- Height: 1.73 m (5 ft 8 in)
- Position: Full-back

Team information
- Current team: Guaireña
- Number: 14

Senior career*
Years	Team	Apps	(Gls)
2005–2006	Club Universal	0	(0)
2007–2010	Rubio Ñu	53	(1)
2010–2018	Guaraní	184	(0)
2019	General Díaz	36	(0)
2020–	Guaireña	2	(0)

International career
2010–2012	Paraguay	6	(0)
- * Club domestic league appearances and goals as of 14:24, 28 September 2020 (UTC)

Tomás Javier Bartoméus Viveros (born 27 October 1982) is a Paraguayan international footballer who plays for Guaireña, as a defender.

== Career ==
Bartomeus has played for Club Universal, Rubio Ñu and Guaraní.

He made his international debut for Paraguay in 2010.
