= 2000 in Paraguayan football =

The following article presents a summary of the 2000 football (soccer) season in Paraguay.

== First division results ==
=== Torneo Apertura ===
The Apertura tournament was played in a two-round all-play-all system, with the champion being the team with the most points at the end of the two rounds.

Position	Team	Played	Wins	Draws	Losses	Scored	Conceded	Points
1	Olimpia	18	11	5	2	38	20	38
2	Sol de América	18	9	5	4	27	21	32
3	Guaraní	18	9	5	4	28	16	32
4	12 de Octubre	18	8	3	7	21	22	27
5	San Lorenzo	18	7	6	5	18	16	27
6	Cerro Porteño	18	7	5	6	22	17	26
7	Sportivo Luqueño	18	6	5	7	25	31	23
8	Atl. Colegiales	18	6	2	10	20	25	20
9	Cerro Corá	18	4	4	10	17	27	16
10	Universal	18	2	2	14	20	41	8

=== Torneo Clausura ===
The Clausura tournament was played in a single all-play-all system. At the end, the top eight teams qualified to a playoff stage to determine the Clausura champion.

Position	Team	Played	Wins	Draws	Losses	Scored	Conceded	Points
1	Olimpia	9	4	4	1	14	6	16
2	12 de Octubre	9	3	6	0	14	8	15
3	Cerro Porteño	9	3	5	1	16	10	14
4	Guaraní	9	3	5	1	8	6	14
5	Cerro Corá	9	3	4	2	9	8	13
6	Atl. Colegiales	9	3	4	2	9	9	13
7	Sol de América	9	2	5	2	11	10	11
8	San Lorenzo	9	3	1	5	13	18	10
9	Universal	9	1	3	5	9	17	6
10	Sportivo Luqueño	9	0	3	6	8	19	3

==== Clausura playoff stage ====
The top eight teams qualified to this stage and were given bonus points based on their final standing in the table. Two groups of four teams were made, with the top two of each group advancing to a playoff stage.

===== Group stage =====
Group A

Position	Team	Played	Wins	Draws	Losses	Scored	Conceded	Bonus Points	Points
1	Olimpia	6	5	0	1	13	3	[3]	18
2	Guaraní	6	3	1	2	7	5	[1.5]	11.5
3	Atlético Colegiales	6	1	2	3	5	9	[0.5]	5.5
4	San Lorenzo	6	1	1	4	6	14	[0]	4

Group B

Position	Team	Played	Wins	Draws	Losses	Scored	Conceded	Bonus Points	Points
1	Cerro Porteño	6	5	1	0	25	5	[2]	18
2	12 de Octubre	6	4	0	2	7	10	[2.5]	14.5
3	Sol de América	6	1	2	3	11	13	[0]	5
4	Cerro Corá	6	0	1	5	5	20	[1]	2

===== Semifinals =====
Team 1	Score	Team 2
Olimpia	2-2 (3 - 1 pen)	12 de Octubre
Cerro Porteño	1-2	Guaraní

===== Clausura final =====
Team 1	Agg.	Team 2	1st leg	2nd leg
Olimpia	4-1	Guaraní	1-0	3-1

Olimpia wins the Clausura tournament final by aggregate score of 4–1.

=== National championship game ===
Since Olimpia won both the Apertura and Clausura tournaments they were declared as the national champions and no playoff game was played.

To determine the second place an extra game between the Apertura runners-up (Sol de America) and the Clausura runners-up (Guarani) was played. Guaraní won the game and were declared runners-up of 2000 (aggregate score of 5–4; first leg 3–1 win by Sol, second leg 4–1 win by Guarani).

=== Relegation / Promotion ===
- Universal automatically relegated to the second division after finishing last in the average points table based over a three-year period.
- Libertad promoted to the first division by winning the second division tournament.

=== Qualification to international competitions ===
- Olimpia qualified to the 2001 Copa Libertadores by winning the Torneo Apertura and Torneo Clausura.
- Guaraní qualified to the 2001 Copa Libertadores by finishing as runners-up of the 2000 season.
- The remaining spot for Copa Libertadores was decided in the Pre-Libertadores playoff tournament.

==== Pre-Libertadores playoff ====
Four teams participated based on aggregate points during the year.

Position	Team	Played	Wins	Draws	Losses	Scored	Conceded	Points
1	12 de Octubre	3	2	0	1	12	8	6
2	Cerro Porteño	3	2	0	1	8	6	6
3	Sol de América	3	1	1	1	6	6	4
4	San Lorenzo	3	0	1	2	7	13	1

- Since Cerro and 12 de Octubre finished tied in points an extra match was played, with Cerro winning 4-2 and qualifying to the 2001 Copa Libertadores.

== Lower divisions results ==
Level	Tournament	Champion
2nd	Intermedia	Libertad
3rd (G.A. teams)	Primera de Ascenso	General Caballero ZC
3rd (interior teams)	UFI Champions Cup	3 de Febrero (Ciudad del Este)
4th (G.A. teams)	Segunda de Ascenso	Capitán Figari

== Paraguayan teams in international competitions ==
- 2000 Copa Libertadores:
  - Cerro Porteño: round of 16
  - Olimpia: group stage
  - Atl. Colegiales: group stage
- Copa MERCOSUR 2000:
  - Cerro Porteño: group stage
  - Olimpia: group stage

== Paraguay national team ==
Date	Venue	Opponents	Score	Comp	Paraguay scorers	Report
2000-02-13	Estadio Defensores del Chaco; Asunción	Hungary	1 - 1	F	Unknown	N/A
March 29, 2000	Estadio Nacional Jose Diaz; Lima	Peru	2 - 0	WCQ 2002	-	Report
April 26, 2000	Estadio Defensores del Chaco; Asunción	Uruguay	1 - 0	WCQ 2002	Ayala 35'	Report
June 3, 2000	Estadio Defensores del Chaco; Asunción	Ecuador	3 - 1	WCQ 2002	Toledo 10'; Brizuela 42', 63'	Report
2000-06-09	Sydney Football Stadium; Sydney	Australia	0 - 0	F		N/A
2000-06-12	Suncorp Stadium; Brisbane	Australia	0 - 0	F		N/A
2000-06-15	Etihad Stadium; Melbourne	Australia	2 - 1	F	Caceres 58'	N/A
June 29, 2000	Estadio Nacional de Chile; Santiago	Chile	3 - 1	WCQ 2002	Cardozo 71'	Report
July 18, 2000	Estadio Defensores del Chaco; Asunción	Brazil	2 - 1	WCQ 2002	Paredes 6'; Campos 83'	Report
July 27, 2000	Estadio Hernando Siles; La Paz	Bolivia	0 - 0	WCQ 2002	-	Report
August 16, 2000	River Plate Stadium; Buenos Aires	Argentina	1 - 1	WCQ 2002	Acuña 60'	Report
September 2, 2000	Estadio Defensores del Chaco; Asunción	Venezuela	3 - 0	WCQ 2002	G. González 30'; Cardozo 34'; Paredes 43'	Report
October 7, 2000	Estadio El Campín; Bogotá	Colombia	0 - 2	WCQ 2002	Santa Cruz 3'; Chilavert 89'	Report
November 15, 2000	Estadio Defensores del Chaco; Asunción	Peru	5 - 1	WCQ 2002	Santa Cruz 15'; Del Solar 25' (o.g.); Cardozo 45'; Paredes 65'; Chilavert 83' (p.k.)	Report
