= Mauro Caballero (footballer, born 1972) =

Paraguayan footballer

Personal information
- Full name: Mauro Antonio Caballero López
- Date of birth: 3 May 1972 (age 54)
- Place of birth: Fernando de la Mora, Paraguay
- Height: 1.75 m (5 ft 9 in)
- Position: Striker

Youth career
- 1991: Olimpia Asunción

Senior career*
Years	Team	Apps	(Gls)
1992–1998	Olimpia Asunción	99	(51)
1999–2001	Tigres de la UANL	26	(7)
2001	Cerro Porteño	15	(7)
2001	Libertad	15	(7)
2002–2004	Olimpia Asunción	70	(26)
2004	Jorge Wilstermann	7	(2)
2005	Nacional Asunción	11	(2)
2005–2007	Olimpia Asunción	37	(10)

International career
1992	Paraguay U23		
1996–2003	Paraguay	14	(2)
- * Club domestic league appearances and goals as of May 2009

Mauro Antonio Caballero López (born 3 May 1972) is a Paraguayan former football striker and current coach of 3 de Febrero in the División Intermedia.

== Career ==
Caballero started playing for Club 24 de Junio of Altos and then moved to the youth divisions of Olimpia Asunción in 1991. In 1992, he made his debut on the senior team for Olimpia, where he would win several national and international championships. Caballero also played for other clubs such as Tigres de la UANL, Cerro Porteño, Club Libertad, Club Jorge Wilstermann, Nacional and Estudiantes de Mérida. His best years as a striker where in 1998 and 2001, when he was the Paraguayan 1st Division topscorer.

== International career ==
Caballero made his international debut for the Paraguay national football team on 9 October 1996 in a World Cup Qualifier against Chile (2-1 win). He obtained a total number of 14 international caps, scoring two goals for the national side. Caballero also played for the Paraguay national football team during the 1992 Olympic Games and the 1998 World Cup qualifiers.

International Goals
#	Date	Venue	Opponent	Score	Result	Competition
1.	3 March 1999	Guatemala City, Guatemala	Guatemala	2–3	2–3	Copa de la Paz
2.	7 March 1999	Guatemala City, Guatemala	Bolivia	1–0	3–0	Copa de la Paz

== Coaching career ==
In January 2022, Caballero was assigned as the coach of División Intermedia team 3 de Febrero, after having coached Olimpia Asunción's under-19 team.

== Honours ==
=== Club ===
- Olimpia Asunción
  - Paraguayan Primera División: 1993, 1995, 1997, and 1998
  - Torneo República: 1992
  - Copa Libertadores: 2002
  - Recopa Sudamericana: 2003
- Cerro Porteño
  - Paraguayan Primera División: 2001

=== Individual ===
- Olimpia Asunción
  - Top scorer Paraguayan Primera División 1998: 21 goals
- Cerro Porteño / Libertad
  - Top scorer Paraguayan Primera División 2001: 21 goals
