= Club Universal =

Paraguayan football club

Club Universal

Club Universal, is a Paraguayan football club based in the city of Encarnación, in the Itapúa Department. The club actually participates in the League of Encarnación.

The club was founded May 14, 1917 and plays in the regional Liga Encarnacena of the Itapúa Department. The team managed to play in the first division in 2000 but got relegated soon after. Their home games are played at the Hugo Stroessner stadium.

== Honors ==
- Paraguayan Second Division: 1

1999

Coaches:

- Blas Meaurio Utilero

• Siriaco Duarte

Players: • Hugo Gaona • Alcides Ayala • Eusebio Paiva • Juan Cardozo • Edgar Fleitas • Darío Villalba • Hugo Martínez • Aldo González • Alberto González • Francisco Gómez • Juan Fernández • Yimi Ferreira • Ever Aranda ▪︎ Jorge Fernández • Ricardo Troche • Guido Rotela • Juan Florentín • Cristhian Ortiz • Marcelo Hug • Luis Amarilla • Carlos Aranda • Mario Aranda • Juan Carlos Recalde • Martín Chávez • Julio Villalba

== Notable players ==
To appear in this section a player must have either:

- Played at least 125 games for the club.
- Set a club record or won an individual award while at the club.
- Been part of a national team at any time.
- Played in the first division of any other football association (outside of Paraguay).
- Played in a continental and/or intercontinental competition.

1990's

- Ninguno

2000's

- (Paraguay) Carlos Guirland (2000)
- (Paraguay) Juan Cardozo (2000–2003)
- (Paraguay) Juan Peralta (2003)
- (Paraguay) Manuel Maciel (2004)
- (Paraguay) Juan Iturbe (2005–2006)
- (Paraguay) Tomás Bartomeus (2005–2006)
- (Paraguay) Pablo Caballero Caceres (2006–2007)

2010's

- Ninguno
