= 1999 in Paraguayan football =

The following article presents a summary of the 1999 football (soccer) season in Paraguay.

== First division results ==
=== Torneo Apertura ===
The Apertura tournament was played in a single all-play-all system. At the end, the top eight teams qualified to a playoff stage to determine the Apertura champion.

Position	Team	Played	Wins	Draws	Losses	Scored	Conceded	Points
1	Olimpia	10	8	2	0	26	8	26
2	Sportivo Luqueño	10	6	3	1	22	13	21
3	Cerro Porteño	10	5	4	1	21	12	19
4	Guaraní	10	4	4	2	16	12	16
5	Sol de América	10	4	3	3	13	9	15
6	San Lorenzo	10	3	4	3	15	14	13
7	Atl. Colegiales	10	4	1	5	16	19	13
8	12 de Octubre	10	2	5	3	11	12	11
9	Cerro Corá	10	2	3	5	17	23	9
10	Presidente Hayes	10	0	4	6	10	22	4
11	Resistencia	10	0	1	9	6	29	1

==== Apertura playoff stage ====
The top eight teams qualified to this stage and were given bonus points based on their final standing in the table. Two groups of four teams were made, with the top two of each group advancing to a playoff stage.

===== Group stage =====
Group A

Position	Team	Played	Wins	Draws	Losses	Scored	Conceded	Bonus Points	Points
1	Olimpia	3	2	1	0	9	5	[3]	10
2	12 de Octubre	3	2	0	1	5	3	[0]	6
3	Sol de América	3	1	0	2	4	7	[1]	4
4	San Lorenzo	3	0	1	2	3	6	[0.5]	1.5

Group B

Position	Team	Played	Wins	Draws	Losses	Scored	Conceded	Bonus Points	Points
1	Atlético Colegiales	3	3	0	0	9	1	[0]	9
2	Cerro Porteño	3	2	0	1	4	5	[2]	8
3	Guaraní	3	1	0	2	3	5	[1.5]	4.5
4	Sportivo Luqueño	3	0	0	3	0	5	[2.5]	2.5

===== Semifinals =====
Team 1	Score	Team 2
Olimpia	1 - 0	Cerro Porteño
Atlético Colegiales	1 - 0	12 de Octubre

===== Apertura final =====
Team 1	Agg.	Team 2	1st leg	2nd leg
Olimpia	2 - 0	Atlético Colegiales	1-0	1-0

Olimpia wins the Apertura tournament final by aggregate score of 2–0.

=== Torneo Clausura ===
The Clausura tournament was played in a single all-play-all system. At the end, the top eight teams qualified to a playoff stage to determine the Clausura champion.

Position	Team	Played	Wins	Draws	Losses	Scored	Conceded	Points
1	Cerro Porteño	10	7	1	2	25	8	22
2	Sportivo Luqueño	10	5	3	2	22	14	18
3	Olimpia	10	4	5	1	13	9	17
4	San Lorenzo	10	3	7	0	11	8	16
5	12 de Octubre	10	3	7	0	16	10	16
6	Guaraní	10	2	6	2	13	15	12
7	* Presidente Hayes	10	2	6	2	6	8	12
8	Atl. Colegiales	10	2	3	5	9	12	9
9	Cerro Corá	10	2	3	5	10	16	9
10	Sol de América	10	1	3	6	5	13	6
11	Resistencia	10	1	2	7	4	21	5

* Presidente Hayes finished in the top eight but their average points over three years forced the team to be relegated so they did not take part of the playoff stage. Cerro Cora took their place instead.

==== Clausura playoff stage ====
The top eight teams qualified to this stage and were given bonus points based on their final standing in the table. Two groups of four teams were made, with the top two of each group advancing to a playoff stage. Cerro Cora replaced Presidente Hayes in playoff stage due to Hayes being relegated to the second division.

===== Group stage =====
Group A

Position	Team	Played	Wins	Draws	Losses	Scored	Conceded	Bonus Points	Points
1	Cerro Porteño	3	2	1	0	6	2	[3]	10
2	Cerro Corá	3	2	1	0	6	3	[0]	7
3	San Lorenzo	3	1	0	2	4	7	[1.5]	4.5
4	Guaraní	3	0	0	3	2	6	[0.5]	0.5

Group B

Position	Team	Played	Wins	Draws	Losses	Scored	Conceded	Bonus Points	Points
1	Olimpia	3	2	0	1	5	3	[2]	8
2	Sportivo Luqueño	3	1	1	1	5	4	[2.5]	6.5
3	12 de Octubre	3	1	1	1	2	2	[1]	5
4	Atlético Colegiales	3	1	0	2	2	5	[0]	3

===== Semifinals =====
Team 1	Score	Team 2
Cerro Porteño	1 - 1 (4 - 3 pen)	Sportivo Luqueño
Olimpia	0 - 1	Cerro Corá

===== Clausura final =====
Team 1	Agg.	Team 2	1st leg	2nd leg
Cerro Porteño	5 - 1	Cerro Corá	3-0	2-1

Cerro P. wins the Clausura tournament final by aggregate score of 5–1.

=== National championship game ===
The national championship game was played between the Apertura and Clausura tournaments winners.

Team 1	Agg.	Team 2	1st leg	2nd leg
Cerro Porteño	2 - 4	Olimpia	0-1	2-3

Olimpia declared as national champions by aggregate score of 4–2.

=== Relegation / Promotion ===
- Presidente Hayes and Resistencia automatically relegated to the second division after finishing last and second-to-last in the average points table based over a three-year period.
- Universal promoted to the first division by winning the second division tournament.

=== Qualification to international competitions ===
- Olimpia qualified to the 2000 Copa Libertadores by winning the Torneo Apertura.
- Cerro Porteño qualified to the 2000 Copa Libertadores by winning the Torneo Clausura.
- The remaining spot for Copa Libertadores was decided in a playoff game between the runners-up of the Apertura (Atl. Colegiales) and Clausura (Cerro Cora). Colegiales won 2-1 and secured a spot for the Copa Libertadores.

== Lower divisions results ==
Level	Tournament	Champion
2nd	Intermedia	Universal
3rd (G.A. teams)	Primera de Ascenso	Tacuary
3rd (interior teams)	UFI Champions Cup	Sport Barrio Guaraní (San Lorenzo)
4th (G.A. teams)	Segunda de Ascenso	Pilcomayo

== Paraguayan teams in international competitions ==
- Copa Libertadores 1999:
  - Cerro Porteño: Semi-finals
  - Olimpia: Group stage
- Copa MERCOSUR 1999:
  - Olimpia: Quarter-finals
  - Cerro Porteño: Group stage
- Copa CONMEBOL 1999:
  - San Lorenzo: First round

== Paraguay national team ==
The following table lists all the games played by the Paraguay national football team in the year 1999.

Date	Venue	Opponents	Score	Comp	Paraguay scorers	Fixture
1999-02-10	Lansdowne Road; Dublin, Ireland	Republic of Ireland	2 - 0	F		464
1999-03-03	Estadio Mateo Flores; Guatemala City, Guatemala	Guatemala	2 - 3	F	Peralta 70'; Centurión 86'; Caballero 89'	465
1999-03-05	Estadio Mateo Flores; Guatemala City, Guatemala	Jamaica	3 - 1	F	Unknown	466
1999-03-07	Estadio Mateo Flores; Guatemala City, Guatemala	Bolivia	3 - 0	F	Caballero 18'; Toledo 61'; González 67'	467
1999-03-31	National Stadium; Kingston, Jamaica	Jamaica	3 - 0	F		468
1999-04-22	Estadio Feliciano Cáceres; Luque, Paraguay	Colombia	0 - 2	F		469
1999-04-28	Monumental Río Parapití; Pedro Juan Caballero, Paraguay	Mexico	2 - 1	F	Cáceres 20'; Caballero 65'	470
1999-06-17	Estadio Antonio Oddone Sarubbi; Ciudad del Este, Paraguay	Uruguay	2 - 3	F	Santa Cruz 37'; Toledo 78'	471
1999-06-24	Estadio Defensores del Chaco; Asunción, Paraguay	Colombia	2 - 1	F	Ovelar 46'; Ayala 70' (pk)	472
1999-06-29	Estadio Defensores del Chaco; Asunción, Paraguay	Bolivia	0 - 0	CA99	-	473
1999-07-02	Estadio Defensores del Chaco; Asunción, Paraguay	Japan	4 - 0	CA99	Benítez 18', 62'; Santa Cruz 40', 86'	474
1999-07-05	Monumental Río Parapití; Pedro Juan Caballero, Paraguay	Peru	1 - 0	CA99	Santa Cruz 86'	475
1999-07-10	Estadio Defensores del Chaco; Asunción	Uruguay	1 - 1 ( 3 - 5 PS)	CA99	Benítez 15'	476
1999-10-13	Soldier Field; Chicago, United States	Mexico	0 - 1	F	Toledo 65'	477
1999-10-15	Estadio Mateo Flores; Guatemala City, Guatemala	Guatemala	0 - 0	F		478
1999-11-03	Estadio Defensores del Chaco; Asunción, Paraguay	Bolivia	0 - 0	F		479
1999-11-17	Estadio Domingo Burgueño; Maldonado, Uruguay	Uruguay	0 - 1	F	Benítez 11'	480
