= 1997 in Paraguayan football =

The following article presents a summary of the 1997 football (soccer) season in Paraguay.

== First division results ==
=== Torneo Apertura ===
The Apertura tournament was played in a single all-play-all system. After every draw during this stage the game went on to a penalty kick shootout, awarding two points to the winner of the shootout and one point to the losing team. At the end, the top eight teams qualified to a playoff stage to determine the Apertura champion.

Position	Team	Played	Wins	Draws P.K. Wins / P.K. Losses	Losses	Scored	Conceded	Points
1	Olimpia	12	7	4/0	1	22	7	29
2	Cerro Porteño	12	7	1/0	4	23	15	23
3	Sol de América	12	6	0/2	4	11	8	20
4	Libertad	12	5	0/5	2	17	13	20
5	San Lorenzo	12	5	1/2	4	15	17	19
6	Guaraní	12	5	1/2	4	18	15	19
7	Presidente Hayes	12	4	3/0	5	13	17	18
8	Sportivo Luqueño	12	5	0/1	6	15	22	16
9	Nacional	12	3	2/3	4	16	21	16
10	Sport Colombia	12	2	3/3	4	17	15	15
11	Tembetary	12	4	1/1	6	14	16	15
12	Atl. Colegiales	12	3	2/0	7	9	15	13
13	Cerro Corá	12	2	2/1	7	15	24	11

- Note: an extra match had to be played between Sportivo Luqueño and Nacional to decide the 8th spot for the playoff stage since both teams finished with the same number of points. The extra match was won by Sportivo Luqueño 2-0. Also, draws were done to determine the 3rd and 5th place and they were won by Sol de America and San Lorenzo respectively.

==== Apertura playoff stage ====
The top eight teams qualified to this stage and were given bonus points based on their final standing in the table. Two groups of four teams were made, with the top two of each group advancing to a playoff stage.

===== Group stage =====
Group A

Position	Team	Played	Wins	Draws P.K. Wins / P.K. Losses	Losses	Scored	Conceded	Bonus Points	Points
1	Olimpia	3	2	0/0	1	5	2	[3]	9
2	Sportivo Luqueño	3	2	0/0	1	7	5	[0]	6
3	Libertad	3	1	0/0	2	5	9	[1.5]	4.5
4	Guaraní	3	1	0/0	2	2	3	[0.5]	3.5

Group B

Position	Team	Played	Wins	Draws P.K. Wins / P.K. Losses	Losses	Scored	Conceded	Bonus Points	Points
1	Cerro Porteño	3	2	1/0	0	7	4	[2.5]	10.5
2	Sol de América	3	1	1/0	1	4	4	[2]	7
3	San Lorenzo	3	1	0/1	1	4	4	[1]	5
4	Presidente Hayes	3	0	0/1	2	1	4	[0]	1

===== Semifinals =====
Team 1	Score	Team 2
Olimpia	0 - 1	Sol de América
Cerro Porteño	1 - 0	Sportivo Luqueño

===== Apertura final =====
Team 1	Score	Team 2
Cerro Porteño	1 - 1 (4 - 3 pen)	Sol de América

Cerro P. wins the Apertura tournament.

=== Torneo Clausura ===
The Clausura tournament was played in a single all-play-all system. After every draw during this stage the game went on to a penalty kick shootout, awarding two points to the winner of the shootout and one point to the losing team. At the end, the top eight teams qualified to a playoff stage to determine the Clausura champion.

Position	Team	Played	Wins	Draws P.K. Wins / P.K. Losses	Losses	Scored	Conceded	Points
1	Cerro Corá	12	8	1/2	1	22	11	28
2	Guaraní	12	6	1/4	1	22	16	24
3	San Lorenzo	12	5	2/1	4	13	10	20
4	Sportivo Luqueño	12	4	3/2	3	18	16	20
5	Olimpia	12	4	4/0	4	18	16	20
6	Atl. Colegiales	12	4	3/2	3	18	18	20
7	Cerro Porteño	12	4	1/4	3	15	13	18
8	Nacional	12	4	1/2	5	14	23	16
9	Tembetary	12	4	1/2	5	31	27	16
10	Sport Colombia	12	3	1/3	5	20	19	14
11	Presidente Hayes	12	3	2/1	6	13	18	14
12	Sol de América	12	3	1/1	7	11	15	12
13	Libertad	12	2	3/0	7	8	21	12

==== Clausura playoff stage ====
The top eight teams qualified to this stage and were given bonus points based on their final standing in the table. Two groups of four teams were made, with the top two of each group advancing to a playoff stage.

===== Group stage =====
Group A

Position	Team	Played	Wins	Draws P.K. Wins / P.K. Losses	Losses	Scored	Conceded	Bonus Points	Points
1	Sportivo Luqueño	3	3	0/0	0	9	3	[1.5]	10.5
2	Guaraní	3	1	1/0	1	5	6	[2.5]	7.5
3	Nacional	3	1	0/1	1	7	7	[0]	4
4	Cerro Porteño	3	0	0/0	3	6	11	[0]	0

Group B

Position	Team	Played	Wins	Draws P.K. Wins / P.K. Losses	Losses	Scored	Conceded	Bonus Points	Points
1	Olimpia	3	2	0/1	0	6	2	[1]	8
2	Cerro Corá	3	1	1/0	1	4	3	[3]	8
3	San Lorenzo	3	1	0/1	1	2	4	[2]	6
4	Atl. Colegiales	3	0	1/0	2	1	4	[0.5]	2.5

===== Semifinals =====
Team 1	Score	Team 2
Olimpia	4 - 2	Guaraní
Cerro Corá	2 - 2 (6 - 5 pen)	Sportivo Luqueño

===== Clausura final =====
Team 1	Score	Team 2
Olimpia	3 - 0	Cerro Corá

Olimpia wins the Clausura tournament.

=== National championship game ===
The national championship game was played between the Apertura and Clausura tournaments winners.

Team 1	Agg.	Team 2	1st leg	2nd leg
Cerro Porteño	1 - 2	Olimpia	0-1	1-1

Olimpia declared as national champions by aggregate score of 2-1.

=== Relegation / Promotion ===
- Tembetary and Sport Colombia automatically relegated to the second division after finishing last and second-to-last in the accumulated table Apertura/Clausura (Opening/Closing).
- 12 de Octubre promoted to the first division by winning the second division tournament.

=== Qualification to international competitions ===
- Cerro Porteño qualified to the 1998 Copa Libertadores by winning the Torneo Apertura.
- Olimpia qualified to the 1998 Copa Libertadores by winning the Torneo Clausura.

== Lower divisions results ==
Level	Tournament	Champion
2nd	Intermedia	12 de Octubre
3rd	Primera de Ascenso	12 de Octubre (Santo Domingo)
4th	Segunda de Ascenso	Atlántida

== Paraguayan teams in international competitions ==
- Copa Libertadores 1997:
  - Club Guaraní: Round of 16
  - Cerro Porteño: Group Stage
- Supercopa Sudamericana 1997:
  - Olimpia: Group Stage
- Copa CONMEBOL 1997:
  - Sportivo Luqueño: First round

== Paraguay national team ==
The following table lists all the games played by the Paraguay national football team in official competitions during 1997.

Date	Venue	Opponents	Score	Comp	Paraguay scorers	Report
January 12, 1997	Estadio Guillermo Soto Rosa; Mérida	Venezuela	0 - 2	WCQ 1998	M.A. Benítez 6'; Enciso 62'	Report
February 12, 1997	Estadio Defensores del Chaco; Asunción	Peru	2 - 1	WCQ 1998	Rivarola 12'; A. Rojas 40'	Report
April 2, 1997	Estadio Defensores del Chaco; Asunción	Colombia	2 - 1	WCQ 1998	Gamarra 6'; D. Soto 82'	Report
April 30, 1997	Estadio Defensores del Chaco; Asunción	Uruguay	3 - 1	WCQ 1998	A. Rojas 37'; J. Cardozo 73'; D. Soto 83'	Report
1997-06-04	Hermann Stadium; St. Louis, United States	United States	0 - 0	F		N/A
1997-06-11	Estadio Félix Capriles; Cochabamba, Bolivia	Chile	0 - 1	CA97	Acuña 28'	N/A
1997-06-14	Estadio Félix Capriles; Cochabamba, Bolivia	Ecuador	2 - 0	CA97		N/A
1997-06-17	Estadio Félix Capriles; Cochabamba, Bolivia	Argentina	1 - 1	CA97	Chilavert 74' (pk)	N/A
1997-06-22	Estadio Ramón Aguilera; Santa Cruz, Bolivia	Brazil	2 - 0	CA97		N/A
July 6, 1997	Estadio Defensores del Chaco; Asunción	Argentina	1 - 2	WCQ 1998	R. Acuña 59'	Report
July 20, 1997	Estadio Nacional de Chile; Santiago	Chile	2 - 1	WCQ 1998	H. Brizuela 61'	Report
August 20, 1997	Estadio Olímpico Atahualpa; Quito	Ecuador	2 - 1	WCQ 1998	R. Báez	Report
September 10, 1997	Estadio Defensores del Chaco; Asunción	Bolivia	2 - 1	WCQ 1998	M.A. Benítez 26'; C. Gamarra 37'	Report
October 12, 1997	Estadio Defensores del Chaco; Asunción	Venezuela	1 - 0	WCQ 1998	F. Torres 69'	Report
November 16, 1997	Estadio Nacional; Lima	Peru	1 - 0	WCQ 1998	-	Report
