= 1998 in Paraguayan football =

The following article presents a summary of the 1998 football (soccer) season in Paraguay.

== First division results ==
=== Torneo Apertura ===
The Apertura tournament was played in a single all-play-all system. At the end, the top eight teams qualified to a playoff stage to determine the Apertura champion.

Position	Team	Played	Wins	Draws	Losses	Scored	Conceded	Points
1	Cerro Porteño	11	8	1	2	24	10	25
2	Sportivo Luqueño	11	6	3	2	17	16	21
3	Olimpia	11	6	2	3	15	7	20
4	Presidente Hayes	11	4	4	3	11	10	16
5	Guaraní	11	4	3	4	11	13	15
6	12 de Octubre	11	4	2	5	14	15	14
7	Sol de América	11	3	4	4	12	15	13
8	Cerro Corá	11	3	3	5	15	18	12
9	Atl. Colegiales	11	3	3	5	10	14	12
10	San Lorenzo	11	3	3	5	12	17	12
11	Nacional	11	2	4	5	18	20	10
12	Libertad	11	2	4	5	8	12	10

==== Apertura playoff stage ====
The top eight teams qualified to this stage and were given bonus points based on their final standing in the table. Two groups of four teams were made, with the top two of each group advancing to a playoff stage.

===== Group stage =====
Group A

Position	Team	Played	Wins	Draws	Losses	Scored	Conceded	Bonus Points	Points
1	Olimpia	3	2	0	1	7	2	[2]	8
2	Sol de América	3	2	0	1	6	5	[0]	6
3	Guaraní	3	1	1	1	5	6	[1]	5
4	Sportivo Luqueño	3	0	1	2	3	8	[2.5]	3.5

Group B

Position	Team	Played	Wins	Draws	Losses	Scored	Conceded	Bonus Points	Points
1	Cerro Porteño	3	3	0	0	10	2	[3]	12
2	12 de Octubre	3	1	1	1	4	6	[0.5]	4.5
3	Cerro Corá	3	1	1	1	3	4	[0]	4
4	Presidente Hayes	3	0	0	3	2	7	[1.5]	1.5

===== Semifinals =====
Team 1	Agg.	Team 2	1st leg	2nd leg
Olimpia	4 - 2	12 de Octubre	3-1	1-1
Sol de América	1 - 1 (7 - 6 P.K.)	Cerro Porteño	1-0	0-1

===== Apertura final =====
Team 1	Agg.	Team 2	1st leg	2nd leg
Olimpia	3 - 1	Sol de América	2-0	1-1

Olimpia wins the Apertura tournament final by aggregate score of 3-1.

=== Torneo Clausura ===
The Clausura tournament was played in a single all-play-all system. At the end, the top eight teams qualified to a playoff stage to determine the Clausura champion.

Position	Team	Played	Wins	Draws	Losses	Scored	Conceded	Points
1	Cerro Porteño	11	8	2	1	28	9	26
2	Guaraní	11	6	3	2	20	15	21
3	Cerro Corá	11	5	3	3	18	16	18
4	Atl. Colegiales	11	5	1	5	14	15	16
5	12 de Octubre	11	4	3	4	18	20	15
6	Sol de América	11	2	7	2	12	10	13
7	* Nacional	11	2	7	2	17	23	13
8	Olimpia	11	3	3	5	13	12	12
9	San Lorenzo	11	2	5	4	13	16	11
10	Sportivo Luqueño	11	2	5	4	8	13	11
11	Libertad	11	1	6	4	12	18	9
12	Presidente Hayes	11	1	5	5	12	18	8

* Nacional finished in the top eight but their average points over three years forced the team to be relegated so they did not take part of the playoff stage. San Lorenzo took their place instead.

==== Clausura playoff stage ====
The top eight teams qualified to this stage and were given bonus points based on their final standing in the table. Two groups of four teams were made, with the top two of each group advancing to a playoff stage. San Lorenzo replaced Nacional in the playoff stage due to Nacional being relegated to the second division.

===== Group stage =====
Group A

Position	Team	Played	Wins	Draws	Losses	Scored	Conceded	Bonus Points	Points
1	Cerro Porteño	3	3	0	0	7	3	[3]	12
2	Atlético Colegiales	3	1	1	1	4	3	[1.5]	5.5
3	San Lorenzo	3	1	0	2	6	7	[0]	3
4	Sol de América	3	0	1	2	3	7	[1.5]	0.5

Group B

Position	Team	Played	Wins	Draws	Losses	Scored	Conceded	Bonus Points	Points
1	Olimpia	3	2	1	0	7	4	[0]	7
2	Cerro Corá	3	1	2	0	6	5	[2]	7
3	Guaraní	3	1	1	1	4	4	[2.5]	6.5
4	12 de Octubre	3	0	0	3	2	6	[1]	1

===== Semifinals =====
Team 1	Agg.	Team 2	1st leg	2nd leg
Cerro Corá	1 - 3	Cerro Porteño	1-0	0-3
Olimpia	6 - 1	Atlético Colegiales	5-0	1-1

===== Clausura final =====
Team 1	Agg.	Team 2	1st leg	2nd leg
Cerro Porteño	4 - 4 (4 - 3 P.K.)	Olimpia	1-4	3-0

Cerro P. wins the Clausura tournament final on penalty shootout 4-3.

=== National championship game ===
The national championship game was played between the Apertura and Clausura tournaments winners.

Team 1	Agg.	Team 2	1st leg	2nd leg
Cerro Porteño	3 - 5	Olimpia	2-2	1-3

Olimpia declared as national champions by aggregate score of 5-3.

=== Relegation / Promotion ===
- Nacional and Libertad automatically relegated to the second division after finishing last and second-to-last in the average points table based over a three-year period.
- Resistencia promoted to the first division by winning the second division tournament.

=== Qualification to international competitions ===
- Olimpia qualified to the 1999 Copa Libertadores by winning the Torneo Apertura.
- Cerro Porteño qualified to the 1999 Copa Libertadores by winning the Torneo Clausura.

== Lower divisions results ==
Level	Tournament	Champion
2nd	Intermedia	Resistencia
3rd (G.A. teams)	Primera de Ascenso	Oriental
3rd (interior teams)	UFI Champions Cup	Sportivo Obrero (San Juan Misiones)
4th (G.A. teams)	Segunda de Ascenso	Sport Colonial

== Paraguayan teams in international competitions ==
- Copa Libertadores 1998:
  - Cerro Porteño: Semi-finals
  - Olimpia: Round of 16
- Copa MERCOSUR 1998:
  - Olimpia: Semi-finals
  - Cerro Porteño: Group stage
- Copa CONMEBOL 1998:
  - Cerro Corá: First round

== Paraguay national team ==
The following table lists all the games played by the Paraguay national football team in official competitions during 1998.

Date	Venue	Opponents	Score	Comp	Paraguay scorers	Report
1998-02-08	Estadio Defensores del Chaco; Asunción, Paraguay	Poland	4 - 0	F	Benítez 25'; Arce 27'; Ayala 55'; Ferreira 67'	450
1998-03-14	Qualcomm Stadium; San Diego, United States	United States	2 - 2	F	Caniza 15'; Arce 27' (pk)	451
1998-03-18	Estadio Olímpico Universitario; Mexico City, Mexico	Mexico	1 - 1	F	Benítez 62'	452
1998-03-28	Yale Bowl; New Haven, United States	Colombia	1 - 1	F	Benítez 43'	453
1998-04-22	Stadio Ennio Tardini; Parma, Italy	Italy	3 - 1	F	Sarabia 57'	454
1998-05-17	Olympic Stadium; Tokyo, Japan	Japan	1 - 1	Kirin Cup	Ayala 7'	455
1998-05-21	Kobe Universiade Memorial Stadium; Kobe, Japan	Czech Republic	1 - 0	Kirin Cup		456
1998-06-01	Philips Stadion; Eindhoven, Netherlands	Netherlands	5 - 1	F	Campos 2'	457
1998-06-03	Steaua Stadium; Bucharest, Romania	Romania	3 - 2	F	Cardozo 27'; Acuña 62'	458
1998-06-06	King Baudouin Stadium; Brussels, Belgium	Belgium	1 - 0	F		459
1998-06-12	Stade de la Mosson; Montpellier, France	Bulgaria	0 - 0	World Cup	-	Report
1998-06-19	Stade Geoffroy-Guichard; Saint-Étienne, France	Spain	0 - 0	World Cup	-	Report
1998-06-24	Stade de Toulouse; Toulouse, France	Nigeria	1 - 3	World Cup	Ayala 1'; Benítez 58'; Cardozo 86'	Report
1998-06-28	Stade Félix Bollaert; Lens, France	France	0 - 0 ( 1 - 0 A.E.T.)	World Cup	-	Report
