= 2023 in Paraguayan football =

Football in Paraguay
- Season: 2023

Men's football
- Primera División: Libertad (Apertura and Clausura)
- División Intermedia: Sol de América
- Tercera División: Tembetary (Metro.) 12 de Junio (Nac.) Encarnacena (Interligas)
- Cuarta División: 12 de Octubre SD
- Copa Paraguay: Libertad
- Supercopa Paraguay: Libertad

Women's football
- Campeonato Femenino: Olimpia (Apertura and Clausura)

The following article presents a summary of the 2023 football season in Paraguay, which was the 113th season of competitive football in the country.

== First Division ==
The 2023 Primera División started on 27 January 2023 and ended on 1 December 2023.

- Cerro Porteño
- General Caballero (JLM)
- Guaireña
- Guaraní
- Libertad
- Nacional
- Olimpia
- Resistencia
- Sportivo Ameliano
- Sportivo Luqueño
- Sportivo Trinidense
- Tacuary

=== Torneo Apertura ===
| Pos | Team | Pld | W | D | L | GF | GA | GD | Pts | Qualification |
|---|---|---|---|---|---|---|---|---|---|---|
| 1 | Libertad (C) | 22 | 16 | 3 | 3 | 39 | 15 | +24 | 51 | Qualification for Copa Libertadores group stage |
| 2 | Cerro Porteño | 22 | 11 | 8 | 3 | 40 | 29 | +11 | 41 | |
| 3 | Sportivo Trinidense | 22 | 11 | 5 | 6 | 34 | 21 | +13 | 38 | |
| 4 | Guaraní | 22 | 8 | 9 | 5 | 29 | 24 | +5 | 33 | |
| 5 | Nacional | 22 | 9 | 6 | 7 | 23 | 21 | +2 | 33 | |
| 6 | Olimpia | 22 | 8 | 7 | 7 | 32 | 26 | +6 | 31 | |
| 7 | Sportivo Ameliano | 22 | 7 | 9 | 6 | 27 | 28 | −1 | 30 | |
| 8 | Sportivo Luqueño | 22 | 6 | 9 | 7 | 27 | 28 | −1 | 27 | |
| 9 | General Caballero (JLM) | 22 | 6 | 6 | 10 | 21 | 28 | −7 | 24 | |
| 10 | Guaireña | 22 | 3 | 8 | 11 | 15 | 31 | −16 | 17 | |
| 11 | Resistencia | 22 | 4 | 5 | 13 | 14 | 35 | −21 | 17 | |
| 12 | Tacuary | 22 | 4 | 3 | 15 | 16 | 31 | −15 | 15 | |

Source: APF, Soccerway
Rules for classification: 1) Points, 2) Head-to-head points, 3) Head-to-head goal difference, 4) Overall goal difference, 5) Goals for, 6) Playoff game (if needed to decide championship between two teams) or Drawing of lots (if three teams or more are tied).
(C) Champions

=== Torneo Clausura ===
| Pos | Team | Pld | W | D | L | GF | GA | GD | Pts | Qualification |
|---|---|---|---|---|---|---|---|---|---|---|
| 1 | Libertad (C) | 22 | 14 | 6 | 2 | 45 | 14 | +31 | 48 | Qualification for Copa Libertadores group stage |
| 2 | Cerro Porteño | 22 | 10 | 10 | 2 | 41 | 21 | +20 | 40 | |
| 3 | Nacional | 22 | 8 | 8 | 6 | 33 | 23 | +10 | 32 | |
| 4 | Guaraní | 22 | 9 | 5 | 8 | 20 | 29 | −9 | 32 | |
| 5 | Olimpia | 22 | 8 | 7 | 7 | 28 | 26 | +2 | 31 | |
| 6 | Tacuary | 22 | 7 | 8 | 7 | 24 | 29 | −5 | 29 | |
| 7 | Sportivo Trinidense | 22 | 7 | 6 | 9 | 34 | 35 | −1 | 27 | |
| 8 | Sportivo Ameliano | 22 | 8 | 3 | 11 | 32 | 34 | −2 | 27 | |
| 9 | General Caballero (JLM) | 22 | 6 | 7 | 9 | 18 | 24 | −6 | 25 | |
| 10 | Sportivo Luqueño | 22 | 6 | 6 | 10 | 24 | 28 | −4 | 24 | |
| 11 | Guaireña | 22 | 6 | 6 | 10 | 29 | 41 | −12 | 24 | |
| 12 | Resistencia | 22 | 5 | 4 | 13 | 20 | 44 | −24 | 19 | |

Source: APF, Soccerway
Rules for classification: 1) Points, 2) Head-to-head points, 3) Head-to-head goal difference, 4) Overall goal difference, 5) Goals for, 6) Playoff game (if needed to decide championship between two teams) or Drawing of lots (if three teams or more are tied).
(C) Champions

=== Aggregate table ===
| Pos | Team | Pld | W | D | L | GF | GA | GD | Pts | Qualification |
|---|---|---|---|---|---|---|---|---|---|---|
| 1 | Libertad (C) | 44 | 30 | 9 | 5 | 84 | 29 | +55 | 99 | Qualification for Copa Libertadores group stage |
| 2 | Cerro Porteño | 44 | 21 | 18 | 5 | 81 | 50 | +31 | 81 | Qualification for Copa Libertadores group stage |
| 3 | Sportivo Trinidense | 44 | 18 | 11 | 15 | 68 | 56 | +12 | 65 | Qualification for Copa Libertadores second stage |
| 4 | Nacional | 44 | 17 | 14 | 13 | 56 | 44 | +12 | 65 | Qualification for Copa Libertadores first stage (Note: Nacional qualified for the Copa Libertadores first stage as the 2023 Copa Paraguay third-placed team.) |
| 5 | Guaraní | 44 | 17 | 14 | 13 | 49 | 53 | −4 | 65 | Qualification for Copa Sudamericana first stage |
| 6 | Olimpia | 44 | 16 | 14 | 14 | 60 | 52 | +8 | 62 | Qualification for Copa Sudamericana first stage |
| 7 | Sportivo Ameliano | 44 | 15 | 12 | 17 | 59 | 62 | −3 | 57 | Qualification for Copa Sudamericana first stage |
| 8 | Sportivo Luqueño | 44 | 12 | 15 | 17 | 51 | 56 | −5 | 51 | Qualification for Copa Sudamericana first stage |
| 9 | General Caballero (JLM) | 44 | 12 | 13 | 19 | 39 | 52 | −13 | 49 | |
| 10 | Tacuary | 44 | 11 | 11 | 22 | 40 | 60 | −20 | 44 | |
| 11 | Guaireña | 44 | 9 | 14 | 21 | 44 | 72 | −28 | 41 | |
| 12 | Resistencia | 44 | 9 | 9 | 26 | 34 | 79 | −45 | 36 | |

Source: APF
Rules for classification: 1) Points, 2) Head-to-head points, 3) Head-to-head goal difference, 4) Overall goal difference, 5) Goals for, 6) Playoff game (if needed to decide international qualification between two teams) or Drawing of lots (if three teams or more are tied).
(C) Champions

=== Relegation ===
Relegation is determined at the end of the season by computing an average of the number of points earned per game over the past three seasons. The two teams with the lowest average were relegated to the División Intermedia for the following season.

| Pos | Team | 2021 Pts | 2022 Pts | 2023 Pts | Total Pts | Total Pld | Avg | Relegation |
|---|---|---|---|---|---|---|---|---|
| 1 | Libertad | 65 | 91 | 99 | 255 | 124 | 2.056 | |
| 2 | Cerro Porteño | 66 | 98 | 81 | 245 | 124 | 1.976 | |
| 3 | Olimpia | 51 | 92 | 62 | 205 | 124 | 1.653 | |
| 4 | Nacional | 50 | 71 | 65 | 186 | 124 | 1.5 | |
| 5 | Sportivo Trinidense | — | — | 65 | 65 | 44 | 1.477 | |
| 6 | Guaraní | 61 | 55 | 65 | 181 | 124 | 1.46 | |
| 7 | Sportivo Ameliano | — | 48 | 57 | 105 | 88 | 1.193 | |
| 8 | Sportivo Luqueño | — | — | 51 | 51 | 44 | 1.159 | |
| 9 | General Caballero (JLM) | — | 51 | 49 | 100 | 88 | 1.136 | |
| 10 | Tacuary | — | 53 | 44 | 97 | 88 | 1.102 | |
| 11 | Guaireña (R) | 44 | 50 | 41 | 135 | 124 | 1.089 | Relegation to División Intermedia |
| 12 | Resistencia (R) | — | 49 | 36 | 85 | 88 | 0.966 | Relegation to División Intermedia |

Source: APF

== Second Division ==
The second-tier División Intermedia began on 31 March and ended on 9 October 2023.

=== Standings ===
| Pos | Team | Pld | W | D | L | GF | GA | GD | Pts | Qualification |
|---|---|---|---|---|---|---|---|---|---|---|
| 1 | Sol de América (C, P) | 30 | 21 | 4 | 5 | 46 | 25 | +21 | 67 | Promotion to Primera División |
| 2 | 2 de Mayo (P) | 30 | 16 | 9 | 5 | 46 | 23 | +23 | 57 | Promotion to Primera División |
| 3 | Independiente (CG) | 30 | 14 | 9 | 7 | 53 | 35 | +18 | 51 | |
| 4 | Deportivo Recoleta | 30 | 15 | 6 | 9 | 59 | 45 | +14 | 51 | |
| 5 | Fernando de la Mora | 30 | 14 | 6 | 10 | 40 | 31 | +9 | 48 | |
| 6 | Rubio Ñu | 30 | 12 | 8 | 10 | 42 | 44 | −2 | 44 | |
| 7 | Deportivo Santaní | 30 | 12 | 8 | 10 | 41 | 43 | −2 | 44 | |
| 8 | Sportivo Carapeguá | 30 | 11 | 10 | 9 | 43 | 31 | +12 | 43 | |
| 9 | Pastoreo | 30 | 11 | 10 | 9 | 37 | 31 | +6 | 43 | |
| 10 | San Lorenzo | 30 | 11 | 9 | 10 | 35 | 27 | +8 | 42 | |
| 11 | 3 de Febrero | 30 | 11 | 6 | 13 | 39 | 42 | −3 | 39 | |
| 12 | Atlético Colegiales | 30 | 9 | 5 | 16 | 29 | 44 | −15 | 32 | |
| 13 | Martín Ledesma | 30 | 8 | 7 | 15 | 30 | 41 | −11 | 31 | |
| 14 | 24 de Setiembre (VP) | 30 | 7 | 8 | 15 | 38 | 52 | −14 | 29 | |
| 15 | Atyrá | 30 | 7 | 5 | 18 | 32 | 58 | −26 | 26 | |
| 16 | 12 de Octubre | 30 | 2 | 8 | 20 | 24 | 62 | −38 | 14 | |

Source: APF, Soccerway
Rules for classification: 1) Points, 2) Head-to-head points, 3) Head-to-head goal difference, 4) Overall goal difference, 5) Goals for, 6) Playoff game (if needed to decide championship between two teams) or Drawing of lots (if three teams or more are tied).
(C) Champions; (P) Promoted

=== Relegation ===
Relegation is determined at the end of the season by computing an average of the number of points earned per game over the past three seasons. The three teams with the lowest average were relegated to Primera División B or Primera División B Nacional for the following season, depending on their geographical location.

| Pos | Team | 2021 Pts | 2022 Pts | 2023 Pts | Total Pts | Total Pld | Avg | Relegation |
|---|---|---|---|---|---|---|---|---|
| 1 | Sol de América | — | — | 67 | 67 | 30 | 2.233 | |
| 2 | Deportivo Recoleta | — | — | 51 | 51 | 30 | 1.7 | |
| 3 | Pastoreo | — | 53 | 43 | 96 | 60 | 1.6 | |
| 4 | San Lorenzo | 53 | 54 | 42 | 149 | 94 | 1.585 | |
| 5 | Independiente (CG) | 51 | 41 | 51 | 143 | 94 | 1.521 | |
| 6 | Fernando de la Mora | 45 | 48 | 48 | 141 | 94 | 1.5 | |
| 7 | Sportivo Carapeguá | — | — | 43 | 43 | 30 | 1.433 | |
| 8 | Rubio Ñu | 39 | 44 | 44 | 127 | 94 | 1.351 | |
| 9 | 2 de Mayo | 36 | 29 | 57 | 122 | 94 | 1.298 | |
| 10 | 3 de Febrero | 48 | 35 | 39 | 122 | 94 | 1.298 | |
| 11 | Martín Ledesma | — | 45 | 31 | 76 | 60 | 1.267 | |
| 12 | Deportivo Santaní | 41 | 33 | 44 | 118 | 94 | 1.255 | |
| 13 | Atlético Colegiales | — | 36 | 32 | 68 | 60 | 1.133 | |
| 14 | Atyrá (R) | 43 | 36 | 26 | 105 | 94 | 1.117 | Relegation to Primera B Nacional |
| 15 | 24 de Setiembre (VP) (R) | — | — | 29 | 29 | 30 | 0.967 | Relegation to Primera B Metropolitana |
| 16 | 12 de Octubre (R) | — | — | 14 | 14 | 30 | 0.467 | Relegation to Primera B Metropolitana |

Source: APF

== Third Division ==
The Third Division is divided into three leagues: the Primera B Metropolitana, the Primera B Nacional and the Campeonato Nacional de Interligas.

=== Primera B Metropolitana ===
==== Standings ====
| Pos | Team | Pld | W | D | L | GF | GA | GD | Pts | Qualification |
|---|---|---|---|---|---|---|---|---|---|---|
| 1 | Atlético Tembetary | 32 | 21 | 5 | 6 | 63 | 34 | +29 | 68 | Promotion to División Intermedia |
| 2 | Cristóbal Colón JAS | 32 | 20 | 7 | 5 | 60 | 25 | +35 | 67 | Playoff for promotion to División Intermedia |
| 3 | River Plate | 32 | 17 | 9 | 6 | 52 | 36 | +16 | 60 | |
| 4 | Benjamín Aceval | 32 | 17 | 8 | 7 | 71 | 32 | +39 | 59 | |
| 5 | General Díaz | 32 | 15 | 5 | 12 | 49 | 50 | −1 | 50 | |
| 6 | Silvio Pettirossi | 32 | 13 | 9 | 10 | 52 | 55 | −3 | 48 | |
| 7 | 3 de Noviembre | 32 | 13 | 8 | 11 | 62 | 56 | +6 | 47 | |
| 8 | Deportivo Capiatá | 32 | 13 | 6 | 13 | 36 | 42 | −6 | 45 | |
| 9 | Olimpia (Itá) | 32 | 12 | 6 | 14 | 54 | 52 | +2 | 42 | |
| 10 | Sportivo Limpeño | 32 | 11 | 8 | 13 | 47 | 46 | +1 | 41 | |
| 11 | Atlántida | 32 | 9 | 13 | 10 | 41 | 38 | +3 | 40 | |
| 12 | 3 de Febrero FBC | 32 | 10 | 8 | 14 | 40 | 52 | −12 | 38 | |
| 13 | Presidente Hayes | 32 | 8 | 11 | 13 | 38 | 48 | −10 | 35 | |
| 14 | Cristóbal Colón (Ñ) | 32 | 8 | 7 | 17 | 44 | 72 | −28 | 31 | |
| 15 | Sportivo Iteño | 32 | 7 | 8 | 17 | 41 | 60 | −19 | 29 | |
| 16 | Deportivo Humaitá | 32 | 7 | 5 | 20 | 35 | 57 | −22 | 26 | |
| 17 | 29 de Setiembre | 32 | 7 | 5 | 20 | 25 | 55 | −30 | 26 | |

Source: APF

==== Relegation ====
Relegation is determined at the end of the season by computing an average of the number of points earned per game over the past three seasons. The two teams with the lowest average will be relegated to the Primera División C for the following season.

| Pos | Team | Avg | Total Pts | Total Pld | 2021 Pts | 2022 Pts | 2023 Pts | Relegation |
|---|---|---|---|---|---|---|---|---|
| 1º | River Plate | 1.875 | 60 | 32 | - | - | 60 | |
| 2º | Atlético Tembetary | 1.872 | 176 | 94 | 49 | 59 | 68 | |
| 4º | Benjamín Aceval | 1.844 | 59 | 32 | - | - | 59 | |
| 6º | Cristóbal Colón JAS | 1.649 | 155 | 94 | 53 | 35 | 67 | |
| 3º | General Díaz | 1.609 | 103 | 64 | - | 53 | 50 | |
| 5º | Deportivo Capiatá | 1.547 | 99 | 64 | - | 54 | 45 | |
| 7º | 3 de Noviembre | 1.500 | 141 | 94 | 36 | 58 | 47 | |
| 8º | Atlántida | 1.415 | 133 | 94 | 32 | 61 | 40 | |
| 10º | Silvio Pettirossi | 1.359 | 87 | 64 | - | 39 | 48 | |
| 9º | Presidente Hayes | 1.319 | 124 | 94 | 43 | 46 | 35 | |
| 11º | Olimpia (Itá) | 1.245 | 117 | 94 | 39 | 36 | 42 | |
| 13º | Cristóbal Colón (Ñ) | 1.160 | 109 | 94 | 41 | 37 | 31 | |
| 12º | 29 de Septiembre | 1.149 | 108 | 94 | 45 | 37 | 26 | |
| 15º | 3 de Febrero FBC | 1.053 | 99 | 94 | 33 | 28 | 38 | |
| 14º | Sportivo Limpeño | 1.021 | 96 | 94 | 38 | 17 | 41 | |
| 17º | Sportivo Iteño | 0.906 | 29 | 32 | - | - | 29 | Relegation to Primera División C |
| 16º | Deportivo Humaitá | 0.813 | 26 | 32 | - | - | 26 | Relegation to Primera División C |

Source: APF

=== Primera B Nacional ===
==== Final phase ====
Semifinals
12 de Junio | 2 | 2 | 4
Guaraní (Fram) | 0 | 1 | 1
Patriotas FC | 1 | 0 | 1
Ovetense | 2 | 0 | 2

Final
12 de Junio | 1
Ovetense | 0

==== Promotion ====
The champions of the B Nacional plays round-trip matches against the runner-up of the B Metropolitana for a promotion spot to the Second Division.

November 22
19:30

| 12 de Junio | 0:0 | Cristóbal Colón JAS |
|---|---|---|
| | Report |

Estadio Defensores del Chaco, Asunción
Referee: Carlos Paul Benítez
November 26
18:00

| Cristóbal Colón JAS | 0:0 | 12 de Junio |
|---|---|---|
| | Report |
Penalties
| Luis Matto (penalty scored); Hugo Oviedo (penalty scored); Walter Núñez (penalty scored); Estiven Pérez (penalty scored); Diego Arias (penalty missed); Alex Ayala (penalty missed) | 4:5 | (penalty scored) Freddy Coronel; (penalty scored) Jesús Asta; (penalty scored) César Ayala; (penalty scored) Daniel Valdvinos; (penalty scored) Marcial Núñez; (penalty missed) Guillermo Beltrán |

Estadio Defensores del Chaco, Asunción
Referee: Juan Gabriel Benítez

=== Campeonato Nacional de Interligas ===
January 15
18:00

| Encarnacena | 6:2 | Horqueteña |
|---|---|---|
| | Report |

Estadio Luis Alberto Salinas, Itauguá

== Domestic cup ==
=== Copa Paraguay ===
The 2023 Copa Paraguay started on 18 April 2023 and ended on 2 December 2023 with a total of 74 teams. The Copa Paraguay final was played between Sportivo Trinidense and Libertad.

2 December 2023

| Sportivo Trinidense | 1–1 | Libertad |
Penalties
| | 1–4 |

Estadio Parque del Guairá, Villarrica

== Super cup ==
=== Supercopa Paraguay ===
After winning the Primera División Apertura and Clausura, and also the Copa Paraguay, Libertad was awarded the 2023 Supercopa Paraguay.
