= 2026 Copa Paraguay =

Tournament details
- Country: Paraguay
- Dates: 2 June – 6 December 2026
- Teams: 74
- Copa Libertadores: Recoleta

Tournament statistics
- Matches played: 74
- Goals scored: 278 (3.76 per match)
- All statistics correct as of 15 November 2026.

The 2026 Copa Paraguay is the eighth edition of the Copa Paraguay, Paraguay's domestic football cup competition organized by the Paraguayan Football Association (APF). The competition began on 2 June and will end on 6 December 2026. The tournament's draw was held on 17 April 2026.

The winners will qualify for the 2027 Copa Libertadores, entering the first stage of that competition, as well as the 2026 Supercopa Paraguay against the 2026 Copa de Primera champions with better record in the aggregate table.

General Caballero (JLM) were the defending champions, but they were eliminated by Rubio Ñu in the third stage.

== Format ==
The competition kept its usual single-elimination format, with the participating teams entering in the first three rounds according to the league in which they played. The first stage was played by the teams in the third and fourth-tier leagues Primera B and Primera C as well as the 17 regional champions, which were drawn into 20 single-match ties and two triangular groups, with 24 teams advancing to the following round.

In the second stage, the first stage winners were joined by 16 teams from the second-tier league División Intermedia. The 40 participating teams were drawn into 20 ties, with the winners advancing to the third stage, where the 12 División de Honor teams entered the competition to set up 16 ties, with the winners advancing to the final knockout rounds (round of 16, quarter-finals, semi-finals, and final).

Ties in all rounds are played on a single-legged basis, with a penalty shootout deciding the winner in case of a draw.

== Teams ==
The 2026 edition features 74 participating teams, 12 from División de Honor, 16 from División Intermedia, 17 from Primera B, 12 from Primera C, and the champions from each of the 17 departments of Paraguay, representing the Unión de Fútbol del Interior (UFI):

División de Honor

- 2 de Mayo
- Cerro Porteño
- Guaraní
- Libertad
- Nacional
- Olimpia
- Recoleta
- Rubio Ñu
- San Lorenzo
- Sportivo Ameliano
- Sportivo Luqueño
- Sportivo Trinidense

División Intermedia

- 3 de Noviembre
- 12 de Junio
- Benjamín Aceval
- Deportivo Capiatá
- Deportivo Santaní
- Encarnación
- Fernando de la Mora
- General Caballero (JLM)
- Guaireña
- Independiente (CG)
- Paraguarí
- Resistencia
- Sol de América
- Sportivo Carapeguá
- Tacuary
- Tembetary

Primera B

- 1 de Marzo (FDM)
- 3 de Febrero (RB)
- 12 de Octubre (I)
- 12 de Octubre (SD)
- 24 de Setiembre
- 29 de Setiembre
- Atlántida
- Atlético Colegiales
- Cristóbal Colón (JAS)
- Martín Ledesma
- Olimpia (Itá)
- Presidente Hayes
- River Plate
- Silvio Pettirossi
- Sport Colombia
- Sportivo Iteño
- Sportivo Limpeño

Primera C

- Atlético Juventud
- Capitán Figari
- Deportivo Pinozá
- Fulgencio Yegros
- General Caballero (CG)
- General Caballero (ZC)
- General Díaz
- Humaitá
- Oriental
- Pilcomayo
- Sport Colonial
- Valois Rivarola

UFI

- Deportivo Ñepytyvo (Concepción)
- 4 de Mayo (San Pedro)
- Teniente Fariña (Cordillera)
- 3 de Mayo (Guairá)
- Deportivo Yhú (Caaguazú)
- 14 de Mayo (Caazapá)
- Atlético Campo Florido (Itapúa)
- 15 de Agosto (Misiones)
- Atlético Guaraní (Paraguarí)
- Santa Mónica (Alto Paraná)
- Juventud Ypanense (Central)
- Sportivo Oliveño (Ñeembucú)
- Deportivo Obrero (Amambay)
- General Caballero (K) (Canindeyú)
- 10 de Julio (Presidente Hayes)
- Naciones Unidas (Boquerón)
- General Caballero (FO) (Alto Paraguay)

== First stage ==
46 clubs competed in the first stage, those being the ones from Primera B, Primera C and UFI, which were drawn into 20 single-match ties and two triangular groups featuring three UFI clubs, one Primera B club and two from Primera C. The winners from the 20 matches as well as the top two teams in each triangular advanced to the second stage. The first stage matches were played from 2 June to 6 July 2026.

2 June 2026	Sportivo Iteño	1–1 (5–4 p)	Martín Ledesma	Asunción
13:00 UTC−3	Gaona 1'	Report	Cabañas 23'	Stadium: Ricardo Gregor; Referee: Jhonatan González
	Penalties
	Acheampong (penalty scored); Gaona (penalty scored); V. Sánchez (penalty scored); C. Sánchez (penalty scored); Verón (penalty scored)		(penalty scored) Ayala; (penalty scored) Balbuena; (penalty scored) Rod. Cardozo; (penalty scored) Valiente; (penalty missed) Ripoll

2 June 2026	12 de Octubre (I)	3–2	Atlántida	Itauguá
18:00 UTC−3	Cazal 37'; Mosqueda 82'; Paredes 90+2'	Report	Fariña 31'; Quintana 71'	Stadium: Luis Alberto Salinas; Referee: Juan Jara

3 June 2026	15 de Agosto	10–0	Sportivo Oliveño	Carapeguá
13:00 UTC−3	Villalba 4'; Rodríguez 8', 30'; Castillo 45+2' (pen.); Cuenca 52', 90'; Talavera 77'; Brizuela 83'; Espinoza 84'; González 88'	Report		Stadium: Municipal; Referee: Sergio Velázquez

3 June 2026	Presidente Hayes	6–1	Deportivo Pinozá	Asunción
15:30 UTC−3	Silva 11'; Vega 31'; Pérez 44', 75'; Watanabe 68'; Caballero 76'	Report	Speratti 62'	Stadium: Jardines del Kelito; Referee: Gedidías Zacarías

3 June 2026	3 de Mayo	1–0	Atlético Guaraní	Carapeguá
18:00 UTC−3	Rojas 75'	Report		Stadium: Municipal; Referee: Fernando Villalba

4 June 2026	Santa Mónica	2–1	Deportivo Yhú	San Estanislao
13:00 UTC−3	Agüero 26'; I. Vázquez 56'	Report	Ferreira 11'	Stadium: La Catedral; Referee: Francisco Osorio

4 June 2026	4 de Mayo	4–0	General Caballero (K)	San Estanislao
15:30 UTC−3	J. Torres 30'; Garcete 36'; Brítez 90+1'; Martínez 90+3'	Report		Stadium: La Catedral; Referee: Gustavo Caballero

4 June 2026	Atlético Juventud	1–3	Sportivo Limpeño	Asunción
18:00 UTC−3	Lovera 72' (pen.)	Report	J. González 14'; Merlo 81'; Guedes 89'	Stadium: Ricardo Gregor; Referee: Blas Medina

9 June 2026	Fulgencio Yegros	2–1	Capitán Figari	Areguá
13:00 UTC−3	Gaona 17'; Aguilar 23'	Report	Pavón 44'	Stadium: Próculo Cortázar; Referee: Basilio Jara

9 June 2026	12 de Octubre (SD)	0–4	24 de Setiembre	Areguá
15:30 UTC−3		Report	Pessolani 31', 75'; Cabrera 37'; Benítez 90+1'	Stadium: Próculo Cortázar; Referee: Gustavo Caballero

10 June 2026	General Caballero (ZC)	0–3	Humaitá	Asunción
13:00 UTC−3		Report	T. Rolón 32', 89'; Garay 90+3'	Stadium: Jardines del Kelito; Referee: Óscar Amarilla

10 June 2026	Silvio Pettirossi	0–5	River Plate	Asunción
18:00 UTC−3		Report	Fariña 8'; Espinoza 27', 50'; Verón 62'; Berrío 90'	Stadium: Jardines del Kelito; Referee: Fernando Villalba

30 June 2026	General Caballero (CG)	2–3	29 de Setiembre	Itá
13:00 UTC−3	Fernández 63', 90+2'	Report	Díaz 29'; Villasanti 60' (pen.); Giménez 82'	Stadium: Manuel Gamarra; Referee: Jhonatan González

30 June 2026	Olimpia (Itá)	5–0	Valois Rivarola	Itá
15:30 UTC−3	Gavilán 4'; B. González 8'; Cabrera 22', 36'; Ríos 73'	Report		Stadium: Manuel Gamarra; Referee: César Rolón

30 June 2026	14 de Mayo	0–4	Atlético Campo Florido	Villarrica
18:00 UTC−3		Report	Bordón 40', 53'; D. Zarza 79'; L. López 88'	Stadium: Parque del Guairá; Referee: Gustavo Caballero

1 July 2026	3 de Febrero (RB)	1–6	Cristóbal Colón (JAS)	Asunción
13:00 UTC−3	Valdez 81'	Report	Ortigoza 16'; Palacios 19'; Alonso 23', 71'; Benítez 51'; Cáceres 73'	Stadium: Ricardo Gregor; Referee: Carlos Figueredo

1 July 2026	Deportivo Obrero	3–3 (4–3 p)	Deportivo Ñepytyvo	Pedro Juan Caballero
15:30 UTC−3	Agüero 6'; Ferreira 72'; Melo 75'	Report	Duarte 42'; A. Prieto 68', 90+1'	Stadium: Río Parapití; Referee: Sergio Velázquez
	Penalties
	Melo (penalty missed); Rojas (penalty scored); Ortiz (penalty scored); Aguilar (penalty missed); Firmino (penalty scored); Ferreira (penalty scored)		(penalty scored) Cáceres; (penalty missed) Meza; (penalty missed) Silva; (penalty scored) A. Prieto; (penalty scored) Villalba; (penalty missed) Sanabria

1 July 2026	Sport Colombia	2–1	Pilcomayo	Asunción
18:00 UTC−3	Ascacíbar 42'; Bernal 72'	Report	Ortellado 81'	Stadium: Ricardo Gregor; Referee: José Armoa

2 July 2026	Teniente Fariña	0–1	Juventud Ypanense	Villeta
15:30 UTC−3		Report	Insfrán 6'	Stadium: Ameliano Villeta; Referee: Fredy Hermosilla

2 July 2026	1 de Marzo (FDM)	3–2	Sport Colonial	Asunción
18:00 UTC−3	Medina 24', 31'; Núñez 74'	Report	Alfonso 32'; Vera 55'	Stadium: Ricardo Gregor; Referee: Francisco Osorio

=== Primera B/Primera C triangular ===
Pos	Team	Pld	W	D	L	GF	GA	GD	Pts	Qualification
1	Atlético Colegiales	2	2	0	0	8	4	+4	6	Advance to Second stage
2	General Díaz	2	1	0	1	7	4	+3	3	Advance to Second stage
3	Oriental	2	0	0	2	3	10	−7	0	

Source: APF
Rules for classification: 1) Points, 2) Goal difference, 3) Goals for, 4) Drawing of lots.

2 June 2026	Atlético Colegiales	3–2	General Díaz	Asunción
15:30 UTC−3	Marinho 26'; Echeverría 70'; Paredes 83'	Report	Colmán 36'; Burgos 75'	Stadium: Ricardo Gregor; Referee: Basilio Jara

9 June 2026	General Díaz	5–1	Oriental	Asunción
18:00 UTC−3	Ortiz 30', 36'; Marín 33', 46'; Vera 86'	Report	Á. Duarte 45+3'	Stadium: Emiliano Ghezzi; Referee: Ángel Fleytas

2 July 2026	Oriental	2–5	Atlético Colegiales	Asunción
13:00 UTC−3	Cañete 54' (pen.), 64'	Report	López 15', 23'; Vega 77', 86'; Marinho 90+1'	Stadium: Ricardo Gregor; Referee: Édgar Galeano

=== UFI triangular ===
Pos	Team	Pld	W	D	L	GF	GA	GD	Pts	Qualification
1	Naciones Unidas	2	2	0	0	5	1	+4	6	Advance to Second stage
2	10 de Julio	2	1	0	1	4	2	+2	3	Advance to Second stage
3	General Caballero (FO)	2	0	0	2	0	6	−6	0	

Source: APF
Rules for classification: 1) Points, 2) Goal difference, 3) Goals for, 4) Drawing of lots.

8 June 2026	Naciones Unidas	0–3; Awarded	General Caballero (FO)	Filadelfia
13:00 UTC−3				Stadium: Departamental Paz del Chaco
Note: Match cancelled and awarded to Naciones Unidas due to the non-appearance of General Caballero (FO).

10 June 2026	General Caballero (FO)	0–3; Awarded	10 de Julio	Filadelfia
15:30 UTC−3				Stadium: Departamental Paz del Chaco; Referee: Francisco Osorio
Note: Match cancelled and awarded to 10 de Julio due to the non-appearance of General Caballero (FO).

6 July 2026	10 de Julio	1–2	Naciones Unidas	Asunción
13:00 UTC−3	É. Cardozo 67'	Report	Jul. Ortiz 9' (pen.); Chávez 47'	Stadium: Ricardo Gregor; Referee: Óscar Amarilla

== Second stage ==
The second stage matches were played from 14 to 29 July 2026.

14 July 2026	Santa Mónica	1–2	Resistencia	Juan León Mallorquín
13:00 UTC−3	Agüero 41'	Report	Gómez 5', 50'	Stadium: Ka'arendy; Referee: Blas Medina

14 July 2026	Cristóbal Colón (JAS)	3–2	3 de Noviembre	Capiatá
15:30 UTC−3	Rodríguez 4'; Alonso 26'; Palacios 58'	Report	Arévalo 36'; Gómez 72'	Stadium: Enrique Soler; Referee: Juan Jara

14 July 2026	Sportivo Limpeño	1–2	General Caballero (JLM)	Juan León Mallorquín
18:00 UTC−3	Merlo 52'	Report	Martínez 11'; Ramírez 27'	Stadium: Ka'arendy; Referee: Víctor Robles

15 July 2026	15 de Agosto	1–1 (1–3 p)	Paraguarí	Carapeguá
13:00 UTC−3	A. Villalba 90'	Report	Paredes 76' (o.g.)	Stadium: Municipal; Referee: Óscar Barrios
	Penalties
	M. Espinoza (penalty missed); Cuenca (penalty scored); Brizuela (penalty missed); González (penalty missed)		(penalty scored) Mendoza; (penalty scored) Garcete; (penalty missed) Bordón; (penalty scored) Duarte

15 July 2026	Atlético Colegiales	0–11	Fernando de la Mora	Capiatá
15:30 UTC−3		Report	Benítez 2'; Martínez 5'; S. Chaparro 15', 46', 76'; Valenzuela 38'; Gavilán 43'; Almada 58'; Velázquez 65'; Ojeda 70'; Pereira 86'	Stadium: Enrique Soler; Referee: Fabio Villalba

15 July 2026	4 de Mayo	2–1	Sportivo Carapeguá	Carapeguá
18:00 UTC−3	Rodríguez 52'; Alarcón 82'	Report	Mereles 86'	Stadium: Municipal; Referee: Carlos Figueredo

16 July 2026	Juventud Ypanense	1–1 (2–4 p)	12 de Octubre (I)	Areguá
13:00 UTC−3	J. Garcete 24' (pen.)	Report	L. Acosta 66'	Stadium: Próculo Cortázar; Referee: Jhonatan González
	Penalties
	Cabrera (penalty missed); Ramírez (penalty scored); Rodríguez (penalty scored); C. Martínez (penalty missed)		(penalty scored) L. Acosta; (penalty missed) Prieto; (penalty scored) D. Martínez; (penalty scored) Ibarra; (penalty scored) Argaña

16 July 2026	Fulgencio Yegros	2–2 (4–2 p)	24 de Setiembre	Areguá
15:30 UTC−3	Vázquez 9'; Barrientos 53'	Report	De Alba 63'; Pessolani 87'	Stadium: Próculo Cortázar; Referee: José Franco
	Penalties
	Vázquez (penalty scored); Martínez (penalty scored); Gamarra (penalty scored); Aguilar (penalty scored)		(penalty missed) Meza; (penalty missed) Medina; (penalty scored) Pessolani; (penalty scored) Florienciañez

21 July 2026	29 de Setiembre	1–1 (7–6 p)	12 de Junio	Villa Hayes
13:00 UTC−3	Franco 86'	Report	Samaniego 90+2'	Stadium: Facundo de León Fossati; Referee: Blas Medina
	Penalties
	L. Fernández (penalty scored); D. Rojas (penalty scored); N. Rojas (penalty scored); J. González (penalty scored); Villasanti (penalty scored); Díaz (penalty missed); Benítez (penalty scored); Franco (penalty scored)		(penalty scored) Recalde; (penalty scored) Yudis; (penalty scored) D. Fernández; (penalty scored) G. González; (penalty scored) E. González; (penalty missed) Samaniego; (penalty scored) Paniego; (penalty missed) M. González

21 July 2026	Olimpia (Itá)	0–3	Deportivo Obrero	San Estanislao
15:30 UTC−3		Report	Melo 13', 67', 74'	Stadium: La Catedral; Referee: Samuel Morales

21 July 2026	10 de Julio	0–4	Benjamín Aceval	Villa Hayes
18:00 UTC−3		Report	Morales 15'; G. Acuña 30'; Martínez 43'; Cuevas 49' (pen.)	Stadium: Facundo de León Fossati; Referee: Fabio Villalba

22 July 2026	3 de Mayo	0–3	1 de Marzo (FDM)	Carapeguá
13:00 UTC−3		Report	Fernández 17', 62'; Molinas 90+2'	Stadium: Municipal; Referee: José Franco

22 July 2026	Humaitá	1–1 (4–2 p)	Encarnación	Encarnación
15:30 UTC−3	T. Rolón 58'	Report	Ortiz 64'	Stadium: Villa Alegre; Referee: Fernando Villalba
	Penalties
	J. Garay (penalty scored); S. Garay (penalty scored); J. Piris (penalty scored); T. Rolón (penalty missed); Fares (penalty scored)		Villasanti (penalty scored); Peña (penalty scored); Lezcano (penalty missed); É. Cáceres (penalty missed)

22 July 2026	Sport Colombia	1–3	Guaireña	Carapeguá
18:00 UTC−3	Galeano 31'	Report	Muñoz 3'; Paredes 60'; M. Amarilla 67'	Stadium: Municipal; Referee: Juan Jara

23 July 2026	Atlético Campo Florido	1–5	Tembetary	Asunción
13:00 UTC−3	Brítez 87'	Report	De. Martínez 15', 23'; Ruiz Díaz 44'; Alarcón 85', 90'	Stadium: Ricardo Gregor; Referee: Jhonatan González

23 July 2026	Sportivo Iteño	3–2	Deportivo Capiatá	Capiatá
15:30 UTC−3	Méndez 31'; Acheampong 52'; Martínez 90+4'	Report	Oviedo 67', 77'	Stadium: Erico Galeano; Referee: Carlos Figueredo

23 July 2026	Naciones Unidas	0–10	Independiente (CG)	Asunción
18:00 UTC−3		Report	Diarra 2'; Rivarola 14'; Roa 25'; Mendoza 29'; Zárate 45'; G. Oviedo 57', 86'; F. Ortiz 66'; Aguada 71'; Román 75'	Stadium: Ricardo Gregor; Referee: Óscar Amarilla

29 July 2026	General Díaz	0–1	Tacuary	Asunción
13:00 UTC−3		Report	Valdez 68'	Stadium: Jardines del Kelito; Referee: Aldo Quiñónez

29 July 2026	Presidente Hayes	0–1	Deportivo Santaní	San Estanislao
15:30 UTC−3		Report	De Souza 23'	Stadium: Juan José Vázquez; Referee: César Rolón

29 July 2026	River Plate	0–2	Sol de América	Asunción
18:00 UTC−3		Report	Aranda 45+10'; Pereira 76'	Stadium: Jardines del Kelito; Referee: Carlos Figueredo

== Bracket ==
Third stage
Resistencia	0
Cerro Porteño	1
General Caballero (JLM)	2 (2)
Rubio Ñu (p)	2 (4)
29 de Setiembre	1 (2)
San Lorenzo (p)	1 (4)
4 de Mayo	3
Fulgencio Yegros	2
1 de Marzo (FDM)	2
Tembetary	3
Sportivo Iteño	2
Guaraní	1
Humaitá	1
2 de Mayo	4
Sol de América	2
Sportivo Trinidense	1
Cristóbal Colón (JAS)	3
Olimpia	5
Paraguarí	0
Sportivo Luqueño	2
Deportivo Santaní	0
Recoleta	2
Guaireña	3
12 de Octubre (I)	2
Deportivo Obrero	0
Fernando de la Mora	3
Tacuary	0 (3)
Libertad (p)	0 (4)
Independiente (CG)	1
Sportivo Ameliano	0
Benjamín Aceval	0
Nacional	2

Round of 16
Cerro Porteño	2
Rubio Ñu	1
San Lorenzo	2
4 de Mayo	1
Tembetary	2
Sportivo Iteño	0
2 de Mayo	0
Sol de América	4
Olimpia	1 (2)
Sportivo Luqueño (p)	1 (4)
Recoleta	3
Guaireña	1
Fernando de la Mora	1 (2)
Libertad (p)	1 (3)
Independiente (CG) (p)	2 (4)
Nacional	2 (3)

Quarter-finals
Cerro Porteño (p)	2 (5)
San Lorenzo	2 (3)
Tembetary	2
Sol de América	3
Sportivo Luqueño	0
Recoleta	2
Libertad	3
Independiente (CG)	1

Semi-finals
Cerro Porteño	1 (3)
Sol de América (p)	1 (4)
Recoleta (p)	1 (5)
Libertad	1 (4)

Final
Sol de América
Recoleta
Third place match
Cerro Porteño
Libertad

== Third stage ==
Matches in this round were played from 11 to 27 August 2026.

11 August 2026	4 de Mayo	3–2	Fulgencio Yegros	San Estanislao
14:00 UTC−3	Vargas 45+1'; Maidana 49'; Antúnez 50'	Report	Gaona 28'; Páez 81'	Stadium: Juan José Vázquez; Referee: Víctor Robles

11 August 2026	Independiente (CG)	1–0	Sportivo Ameliano	Villeta
16:30 UTC−3	Dietze 78'	Report		Stadium: Ameliano Villeta; Referee: Giancarlos Juliadoza

12 August 2026	29 de Setiembre	1–1 (2–4 p)	San Lorenzo	Asunción
14:00 UTC−3	Benítez 44'	Report	M. Ferreira 64'	Stadium: Ricardo Gregor; Referee: Juan López
	Penalties
	L. Fernández (penalty scored); Rojas (penalty scored); T. González (penalty missed); Zaracho (penalty missed)		(penalty scored) Barrios; (penalty scored) Villamayor; (penalty scored) Aragón; (penalty scored) Esteche

12 August 2026	Sportivo Iteño	2–1	Guaraní	Nueva Asunción
16:30 UTC−3	Meza 60'; Benítez 71'	Report	Rodríguez 45'	Stadium: Óscar Hugo Sosa; Referee: Aldo Quiñónez

13 August 2026	1 de Marzo (FDM)	2–3	Tembetary	Capiatá
16:30 UTC−3	Oviedo 27' (pen.), 37' (pen.)	Report	Peralta 9', 19', 41'	Stadium: Erico Galeano; Referee: Fabio Villalba

18 August 2026	Benjamín Aceval	0–2	Nacional	Asunción
16:30 UTC−3		Report	Bailone 5', 65'	Stadium: Arsenio Erico; Referee: Alipio Colmán

19 August 2026	Deportivo Obrero	0–3	Fernando de la Mora	San Estanislao
14:00 UTC−3		Report	Chaparro 4'; Orquiola 65', 66'	Stadium: Juan José Vázquez; Referee: Fabio Villalba

19 August 2026	Paraguarí	0–2	Sportivo Luqueño	Carapeguá
16:30 UTC−3		Report	Maggi 46'; Pérez 89'	Stadium: Municipal; Referee: Giancarlos Juliadoza

20 August 2026	Humaitá	1–4	2 de Mayo	Pedro Juan Caballero
14:00 UTC−3	T. Rolón 45+1'	Report	Aguilera 40', 54'; Cáceres 48'; Díaz 75'	Stadium: Río Parapití; Referee: Aldo Quiñónez

20 August 2026	Tacuary	0–0 (3–4 p)	Libertad	Asunción
16:30 UTC−3		Report		Stadium: La Huerta; Referee: Álvaro Giménez
	Penalties
	Valdez (penalty scored); Servín (penalty missed); Martínez (penalty missed); Espinoza (penalty scored); Núñez (penalty scored)		(penalty scored) Nequecaur; (penalty scored) Sanabria; (penalty missed) Freire; (penalty scored) R. Villalba; (penalty scored) E. Vera

25 August 2026	General Caballero (JLM)	2–2 (2–4 p)	Rubio Ñu	Itauguá
16:00 UTC−3	R. Gómez 14'; Alegre 82'	Report	Montiel 30'; Páez 77'	Stadium: Luis Alberto Salinas; Referee: Giancarlos Juliadoza
	Penalties
	N. Gómez (penalty missed); Barrios (penalty missed); Verdún (penalty scored); Santacruz (penalty scored)		(penalty scored) Rojas; (penalty scored) De Carvalho; (penalty scored) Roldán; (penalty scored) Páez

25 August 2026	Sol de América	2–1	Sportivo Trinidense	Nueva Asunción
18:30 UTC−3	Mora 10'; Rivarola 54'	Report	Abreu 17'	Stadium: Óscar Hugo Sosa; Referee: Aldo Quiñónez

26 August 2026	Deportivo Santaní	0–2	Recoleta	San Estanislao
16:00 UTC−3		Report	Galeano 25'; Echeguren 43'	Stadium: Juan José Vázquez; Referee: Víctor Robles

26 August 2026	Cristóbal Colón (JAS)	3–5	Olimpia	Capiatá
18:30 UTC−3	Ojeda 42', 58'; Báez 44'	Report	Bentaberry 29'; Ferreira 40'; Sandoval 45+1'; Lezcano 48' (pen.); González 90+4'	Stadium: Erico Galeano; Referee: Derlis Benítez

27 August 2026	Guaireña	3–2	12 de Octubre (I)	Villarrica
16:00 UTC−3	Torales 22'; Amarilla 45+2' (pen.); Araújo 89'	Report	Salinas 12'; D. Aquino 51'	Stadium: Parque del Guairá; Referee: Juan López

27 August 2026	Resistencia	0–1	Cerro Porteño	Asunción
18:30 UTC−3		Report	Morel 85'	Stadium: La Arboleda; Referee: Carlos Paul Benítez

== Round of 16 ==
The schedule for the round of 16 was announced by the Paraguayan Football Association on 10 September 2026, with the matches played from 22 September to 1 October 2026.

22 September 2026	2 de Mayo	0–4	Sol de América	Asunción
18:30 UTC−3		Report	Fernández 3'; Gaona 35'; Marecos 90'; Leguizamón 90+2'	Stadium: Emiliano Ghezzi; Referee: Alipio Colmán

23 September 2026	San Lorenzo	2–1	4 de Mayo	San Estanislao
16:00 UTC−3	S. Salcedo 50' (pen.); Duarte 76'	Report	Antúnez 82' (pen.)	Stadium: Juan José Vázquez; Referee: Aldo Quiñónez

23 September 2026	Fernando de la Mora	1–1 (2–3 p)	Libertad	Asunción
18:30 UTC−3	R. Chaparro 33'	Report	Aguilar 21'	Stadium: Arsenio Erico; Referee: Juan López
	Penalties
	Jara (penalty missed); Gavilán (penalty scored); S. Chaparro (penalty scored); Olmedo (penalty missed); Benítez (penalty missed)		(penalty missed) Carrizo; (penalty scored) Nequecaur; (penalty scored) Campuzano; (penalty scored) R. Villalba; (penalty missed) Aguilar

24 September 2026	Tembetary	2–0	Sportivo Iteño	Asunción
16:00 UTC−3	Mercado 32'; Ruiz Díaz 72'	Report		Stadium: Ricardo Gregor; Referee: Álvaro Giménez

24 September 2026	Recoleta	3–1	Guaireña	San Lorenzo
18:30 UTC−3	González 59'; Báez 75'; Martino 82'	Report	Arce 43'	Stadium: Gunther Vogel; Referee: Giancarlos Juliadoza

30 September 2026	Independiente (CG)	2–2 (4–3 p)	Nacional	Asunción
17:00 UTC−3	Diarra 6'; Sarquis 90+2'	Report	Melgarejo 29'; C. Espínola 55'	Stadium: La Arboleda; Referee: Blas Romero
	Penalties
	Sarquis (penalty scored); Montiel (penalty scored); Román (penalty scored); Diarra (penalty scored); Villalba (penalty missed)		(penalty scored) Meza; (penalty missed) Jara; (penalty scored) Prieto; (penalty scored) C. Espínola; (penalty missed) Coronel

30 September 2026	Cerro Porteño	2–1	Rubio Ñu	Itauguá
19:30 UTC−3	Morel 31'; F. Domínguez 67'	Report	Leiva 69'	Stadium: Luis Alberto Salinas; Referee: José Méndez

1 October 2026	Olimpia	1–1 (2–4 p)	Sportivo Luqueño	Asunción
19:00 UTC−3	Gamarra 67'	Report	Ruiz 55'	Stadium: Defensores del Chaco; Referee: Mario Díaz de Vivar
	Penalties
	Ávalos (penalty missed); Sandoval (penalty missed); Alfaro (penalty scored); Delmás (penalty scored)		(penalty scored) Bogado; (penalty scored) Comas; (penalty scored) Pérez; (penalty scored) Muro

== Quarter-finals ==
The quarter-final matches were played from 14 to 28 October 2026.

14 October 2026	Tembetary	2–3	Sol de América	Asunción
17:00 UTC−3	Silvero 1'; Cristaldo 56'	Report	Fernández 74'; Mora 81'; Rivarola 90+4'	Stadium: Ricardo Gregor; Referee: Juan López

14 October 2026	Cerro Porteño	2–2 (5–3 p)	San Lorenzo	Asunción
19:30 UTC−3	Riveros 24'; Araujo 45+1'	Report	Gerzel 4', 18'	Stadium: Defensores del Chaco; Referee: David Ojeda
	Penalties
	Aliseda (penalty scored); F. Domínguez (penalty scored); Vegetti (penalty scored); Morel (penalty scored); Torres (penalty scored)		(penalty scored) Barrios; (penalty missed) Piñatares; (penalty scored) Paredes; (penalty scored) Álvarez

27 October 2026	Libertad	3–1	Independiente (CG)	Asunción
19:30 UTC−3	M. Fernández 38'; Aguilar 90+3'; Melgarejo 90+4'	Report	Burgos 71'	Stadium: La Arboleda; Referee: Giancarlos Juliadoza

28 October 2026	Sportivo Luqueño	0–2	Recoleta	Itauguá
19:30 UTC−3		Report	Martino 61'; González 70'	Stadium: Luis Alberto Salinas; Referee: Blas Romero

== Semi-finals ==
The semi-finals were played on 14 and 15 November 2026.

14 November 2026	Recoleta	1–1 (5–4 p)	Libertad	Asunción
18:00 UTC−3	Silva 90+3' (pen.)	Report	Ramírez 18'	Stadium: La Arboleda; Referee: Derlis López
	Penalties
	Silva (penalty scored); González (penalty scored); Cañete (penalty scored); Charpentier (penalty scored); Báez (penalty scored)		(penalty scored) Fernández; (penalty scored) Freire; (penalty missed) Campuzano; (penalty scored) Martínez; (penalty scored) Aguilar

15 November 2026	Cerro Porteño	1–1 (3–4 p)	Sol de América	Itauguá
18:00 UTC−3	Vegetti 71'	Report	Villagra 48'	Stadium: Juan Canuto Petengill; Referee: Mario Díaz de Vivar
	Penalties
	Iturbe (penalty missed); Quintana (penalty scored); Morel (penalty scored); Vegetti (penalty scored); Rodríguez (penalty missed)		(penalty missed) Dávalos; (penalty scored) Kovacs; (penalty scored) Marecos; (penalty scored) Mora; (penalty scored) Gaona

== Third place match ==
26 November 2026
19:30 UTC−3

Cerro Porteño	v	Libertad

Estadio Defensores del Chaco, Asunción

== Final ==
6 December 2026
19:00 UTC−3

Sol de América	v	Recoleta

Estadio La Huerta, Asunción

== See also ==
- 2026 Copa de Primera
- 2026 APF División Intermedia
