= 2024 in Paraguayan football =

Football in Paraguay
- Season: 2024

The following article presents a summary of the 2024 football season in Paraguay, which is the 114th season of competitive football in the country.

== First Division ==
The 2024 Primera División started on 19 January 2024 and ended on 29 December 2024.

- 2 de Mayo
- Cerro Porteño
- General Caballero (JLM)
- Guaraní
- Libertad
- Nacional
- Olimpia
- Sol de América
- Sportivo Ameliano
- Sportivo Luqueño
- Sportivo Trinidense
- Tacuary

=== Torneo Apertura ===
Pos	Team	Pld	W	D	L	GF	GA	GD	Pts
1	Libertad (C)	22	14	6	2	42	16	+26	48
2	Cerro Porteño	22	13	6	3	40	17	+23	45
3	Olimpia	22	9	9	4	28	21	+7	36
4	Sportivo Luqueño	22	10	5	7	25	22	+3	35
5	Guaraní	22	8	7	7	31	25	+6	31 (Note: Head-to-head points: Guaraní 6, 2 de Mayo 0.)
6	2 de Mayo	22	9	4	9	28	25	+3	31
7	Sol de América	22	7	5	10	26	39	−13	26
8	Tacuary	22	5	8	9	26	38	−12	23 (Note: Head-to-head points: Tacuary 4, Sportivo Ameliano 1.)
9	Sportivo Ameliano	22	6	5	11	17	32	−15	23
10	Nacional	22	6	4	12	24	35	−11	22
11	Sportivo Trinidense	22	6	3	13	30	34	−4	21
12	General Caballero (JLM)	22	3	10	9	22	35	−13	19

Source: APF, Soccerway
Rules for classification: 1) Points, 2) Head-to-head points, 3) Head-to-head goal difference, 4) Overall goal difference, 5) Goals for, 6) Playoff game (if needed to decide championship between two teams) or Drawing of lots (if three teams or more are tied).
(C) Champions

=== Torneo Clausura ===
Pos	Team	Pld	W	D	L	GF	GA	GD	Pts
1	Olimpia (C)	22	12	8	2	29	13	+16	44
2	Guaraní	22	7	14	1	22	15	+7	35
3	2 de Mayo	22	9	7	6	25	18	+7	34
4	Sportivo Ameliano	22	9	6	7	21	16	+5	33 (Note: Head-to-head points: Sportivo Ameliano 4, Nacional 1.)
5	Nacional	22	8	9	5	22	16	+6	33
6	Cerro Porteño	22	8	5	9	26	28	−2	29
7	General Caballero (JLM)	22	6	10	6	18	21	−3	28
8	Sportivo Luqueño	22	6	8	8	27	32	−5	26
9	Libertad	22	7	5	10	23	29	−6	26
10	Sportivo Trinidense	22	6	7	9	25	28	−3	25
11	Sol de América	22	5	6	11	22	26	−4	21
12	Tacuary	22	4	5	13	17	35	−18	17

Source: APF, Soccerway
Rules for classification: 1) Points, 2) Head-to-head points, 3) Head-to-head goal difference, 4) Overall goal difference, 5) Goals for, 6) Playoff game (if needed to decide championship between two teams) or Drawing of lots (if three teams or more are tied).
(C) Champions

=== Aggregate table ===
Pos	Team	Pld	W	D	L	GF	GA	GD	Pts	Qualification
1	Olimpia (C)	44	21	17	6	57	34	+23	80	Qualification for Copa Libertadores group stage
2	Libertad (C)	44	21	11	12	65	45	+20	74 (Note: Head-to-head points: Libertad 7, Cerro Porteño 4.)	Qualification for Copa Libertadores group stage
3	Cerro Porteño	44	21	11	12	66	45	+21	74	Qualification for Copa Libertadores second stage
4	Guaraní	44	15	21	8	53	40	+13	66	Qualification for Copa Sudamericana first stage
5	2 de Mayo	44	18	11	15	53	43	+10	65	Qualification for Copa Sudamericana first stage
6	Sportivo Luqueño	44	16	13	15	52	54	−2	61	Qualification for Copa Sudamericana first stage
7	Sportivo Ameliano	44	15	11	18	38	48	−10	56	Qualification for Copa Sudamericana first stage
8	Nacional	44	14	13	17	46	51	−5	55	Qualification for Copa Libertadores first stage (Note: Nacional qualified for the Copa Libertadores first stage as 2024 Copa Paraguay runners-up, since the cup winners Libertad qualified for the Copa Libertadores group stage on league performance.)
9	Sol de América	44	12	11	21	49	65	−16	47 (Note: Head-to-head points: Sol de América 10, General Caballero (JLM) 1.)	
10	General Caballero (JLM)	44	9	20	15	40	57	−17	47	
11	Sportivo Trinidense	44	12	10	22	55	62	−7	46	
12	Tacuary	44	9	13	22	43	73	−30	40	

Source: APF
Rules for classification: 1) Points, 2) Head-to-head points, 3) Head-to-head goal difference, 4) Overall goal difference, 5) Goals for, 6) Playoff game (if needed to decide championship between two teams) or Drawing of lots (if three teams or more are tied).
(C) Champions

=== Relegation ===
Pos	Team	2022 Pts	2023 Pts	2024 Pts	Total Pts	Total Pld	Avg	Relegation
1	Libertad	91	99	74	264	132	2	
2	Cerro Porteño	98	81	74	253	132	1.917	
3	Olimpia	92	62	80	234	132	1.773	
4	2 de Mayo	—	—	65	65	44	1.477	
5	Nacional	71	65	55	191	132	1.447	
6	Guaraní	55	65	66	186	132	1.409	
7	Sportivo Luqueño	—	51	61	112	88	1.273	
8	Sportivo Trinidense	—	65	46	111	88	1.261	
9	Sportivo Ameliano	48	57	56	161	132	1.22	
10	General Caballero (JLM)	51	49	47	147	132	1.114	
11	Sol de América (R)	—	—	47	47	44	1.068	Relegation to División Intermedia
12	Tacuary (R)	53	44	40	137	132	1.038	Relegation to División Intermedia

== Second Division ==
The second-tier División Intermedia started in 5 April and ended in 14 October 2024.

- 3 de Febrero
- 12 de Junio
- Atlético Colegiales
- Atlético Tembetary
- Deportivo Recoleta
- Deportivo Santaní
- Encarnación
- Fernando de la Mora
- Guaireña
- Independiente (CG)
- Martín Ledesma
- Pastoreo
- Resistencia
- Rubio Ñu
- San Lorenzo
- Sportivo Carapeguá

=== Standings ===
Pos	Team	Pld	W	D	L	GF	GA	GD	Pts	Qualification
1	Deportivo Recoleta (C, P)	30	19	8	3	57	20	+37	65	Promotion to Primera División
2	Tembetary (P)	30	19	5	6	46	24	+22	62	Promotion to Primera División
3	Sportivo Carapeguá	30	17	7	6	45	27	+18	58	
4	San Lorenzo	30	12	10	8	35	31	+4	46	
5	Resistencia	30	13	6	11	35	35	0	45	
6	Encarnación	30	12	8	10	43	39	+4	44	
7	Rubio Ñu	30	11	9	10	33	35	−2	42 (Note: Head-to-head points: Rubio Ñu 6, Deportivo Santaní 0.)	
8	Deportivo Santaní	30	11	9	10	35	33	+2	42	
9	Guaireña (Note: Guaireña were deducted three points as punishment for failing to pay a debt with player Enrique Borja.)	30	10	11	9	30	25	+5	38 (Note: Head-to-head points: Guaireña 7, Independiente (CG) 5, 12 de Junio 4.)	
10	Independiente (CG)	30	10	8	12	33	37	−4	38	
11	12 de Junio	30	10	8	12	35	35	0	38	
12	Martín Ledesma	30	8	12	10	28	35	−7	36	
13	Fernando de la Mora	30	8	11	11	31	33	−2	35	
14	3 de Febrero	30	6	11	13	24	37	−13	29	
15	Pastoreo	30	6	5	19	28	50	−22	23	
16	Atlético Colegiales	30	2	4	24	28	70	−42	10	

Source: APF, Soccerway
Rules for classification: 1) Points, 2) Head-to-head points, 3) Head-to-head goal difference, 4) Overall goal difference, 5) Goals for, 6) Playoff game (if needed to decide championship between two teams) or Drawing of lots (if three teams or more are tied).
(C) Champions; (P) Promoted

=== Relegation ===
Relegation was determined at the end of the season by computing an average of the total of points earned per game over the past three seasons. The three teams with the lowest average were relegated to Primera División B or Primera División B Nacional for the following season, depending on their geographical location.

Pos	Team	2022 Pts	2023 Pts	2024 Pts	Total Pts	Total Pld	Avg	Relegation
1	Tembetary	—	—	62	62	30	2.067	
2	Deportivo Recoleta	—	51	65	116	60	1.933	
3	Sportivo Carapeguá	—	43	58	101	60	1.683	
4	San Lorenzo	54	42	46	142	90	1.578	
5	Resistencia	—	—	45	45	30	1.5	
6	Independiente (CG)	41	51	41	133	90	1.478	
7	Encarnación	—	—	44	44	30	1.467	
8	Fernando de la Mora	48	48	35	131	90	1.456	
9	Rubio Ñu	44	44	42	130	90	1.444	
10	Deportivo Santaní	33	44	42	119	90	1.322	
11	Pastoreo	53	43	23	119	90	1.322	
12	Guaireña	—	—	38	38	30	1.267	
13	12 de Junio	—	—	38	38	30	1.267	
14	Martín Ledesma (R)	45	31	36	112	90	1.244	Relegation to Primera B Metropolitana
15	3 de Febrero (R)	35	39	29	103	90	1.144	Relegation to Primera B Nacional
16	Atlético Colegiales (R)	36	32	10	78	90	0.867	Relegation to Primera B Metropolitana

Source: APF

== Third Division ==
The Third Division is divided into three leagues: the Primera B Metropolitana, the Primera B Nacional and the Campeonato Nacional de Interligas, this last being played every two years.

=== Primera B Metropolitana ===
==== Standings ====
Pos	Team	Pld	W	D	L	GF	GA	GD	Pts	Qualification
1	Deportivo Capiatá (C, P)	34	22	9	3	63	31	+32	75	Promotion to División Intermedia
2	River Plate (P)	34	18	13	3	56	28	+28	67	Promotion to División Intermedia
3	Atlántida	34	19	7	8	41	27	+14	64	
4	Benjamín Aceval	34	18	7	9	65	35	+30	61	
5	12 de Octubre ITG	34	15	13	6	45	34	+11	58	
6	Cristóbal Colón JAS	34	17	6	11	62	43	+19	57	
7	24 de Setiembre	34	15	11	8	60	41	+19	56	
8	Olimpia de Itá	34	12	13	9	47	41	+6	49	
9	3 de Febrero FBC	34	13	9	12	45	44	+1	48	
10	3 de Noviembre	34	12	8	14	50	37	+13	44	
11	Sport Colombia	34	12	8	14	40	43	−3	44	
12	Silvio Pettirossi	34	9	8	17	43	49	−6	35	
13	Sportivo Limpeño	34	8	10	16	37	50	−13	34	
14	General Díaz	34	8	8	18	32	54	−22	32	
15	Presidente Hayes	34	7	10	17	32	59	−27	31	
16	29 de Setiembre	34	7	9	18	38	72	−34	30	
17	12 de Octubre SDO	34	6	11	17	43	61	−18	29	
18	Cristóbal Colón ÑEM	34	4	8	22	36	86	−50	20	

Source: APF
(C) Champions; (P) Promoted

=== Primera B Nacional ===
==== Final ====
18 January 2025
19:00 UTC−3

Guaraní (Fram)	1–1	CEFFCA
Giménez 1'	Report	Candia 70'
Penalties
	4–3

Estadio CARFEM, Ypané

== Fourth Division ==
The Fourth Division is divided into three leagues: the Primera División C, the Primera C Nacional and the Ligas Regionales.

== Domestic cup ==
=== Copa Paraguay ===
==== Final ====
6 December 2024
19:30 UTC−3

Libertad	1–0	Nacional
Lezcano 55'	Report

Estadio Defensores del Chaco, Asunción
Referee: Juan Benítez

== Super cup ==
=== Supercopa Paraguay ===
==== Final ====
22 January 2025
19:30 UTC−3

Libertad	2–1	Olimpia
Espinoza 41'; Santa Cruz 62'	Report	González 76'

Estadio Defensores del Chaco, Asunción
Referee: David Ojeda

== Paraguayan clubs in international competitions ==
List of Paraguayan representatives at continental competitions and their best result.

Team	2024 Copa Libertadores	2024 Copa Sudamericana
Cerro Porteño	Group stage	Knockout round play-offs
Guaraní	N/A	First stage
Libertad	Group stage	Quarter-finals
Nacional	Third stage	Group stage
Olimpia	N/A	First stage
Sportivo Ameliano	N/A	Round of 16
Sportivo Luqueño	N/A	Group stage
Sportivo Trinidense	Third stage	Group stage

== National men's team ==
The following table lists all the games played by the Paraguayan national men's team in official competitions and friendly matches during 2024.

25 March Friendly	Russia	Cancelled	Paraguay	Moscow, Russia
20:00 UTC+3		Report		Stadium: VTB Arena
Note: Match was cancelled due to the Crocus City Hall attack.

7 June Friendly	Peru	0–0	Paraguay	Lima, Peru
19:30 UTC−5		Report		Stadium: Estadio Monumental; Referee: Guillermo Guerrero (Ecuador)

11 June Friendly	Chile	3–0	Paraguay	Santiago, Chile
21:00 UTC−3	Dávila 17', 37'; Vargas 53'	Report		Stadium: Estadio Nacional Julio Martínez Prádanos; Referee: Pablo Echavarría (Argentina)

16 June Friendly	Panama	0–1	Paraguay	Panama City, Panama
17:30 UTC−5		Report	Velázquez 25'	Stadium: Estadio Rommel Fernández; Referee: David Gómez (Costa Rica)

24 June 2024 Copa América	Colombia	2–1	Paraguay	Houston, United States
17:00 UTC−5	Muñoz 32'; Lerma 42'	Report	Enciso 69'	Stadium: NRG Stadium; Attendance: 67,059; Referee: Dario Herrera (Argentina)

28 June 2024 Copa América	Paraguay	1–4	Brazil	Paradise, United States
18:00 UTC−7	Alderete 48'	Report	Vinícius 35', 45+5'; Savinho 43'; Paquetá 65' (pen.)	Stadium: Allegiant Stadium; Attendance: 46,939; Referee: Piero Maza (Chile)

2 July 2024 Copa América	Costa Rica	2–1	Paraguay	Austin, United States
20:00 UTC−5	Calvo 3'; Alcócer 7'	Report	Sosa 55'	Stadium: Q2 Stadium; Attendance: 12,765; Referee: Yael Falcón (Argentina)

6 September 2026 FIFA World Cup qualification	Uruguay	0–0	Paraguay	Montevideo, Uruguay
20:30 UTC−3		Report		Stadium: Estadio Centenario; Attendance: 47,741; Referee: Darío Herrera (Argentina)

10 September 2026 FIFA World Cup qualification	Paraguay	1–0	Brazil	Asunción, Paraguay
20:30 UTC−4	D. Gómez 20'	Report		Stadium: Estadio Defensores del Chaco; Attendance: 31,962; Referee: Andrés Matonte (Uruguay)

10 October 2026 FIFA World Cup qualification	Ecuador	0–0	Paraguay	Quito, Ecuador
16:00 UTC−5		Report		Stadium: Estadio Rodrigo Paz Delgado; Referee: Raphael Claus (Brazil)

15 October 2026 FIFA World Cup qualification	Paraguay	2–1	Venezuela	Asunción, Paraguay
20:00 UTC−3	Sanabria 59', 74'	Report	Aramburu 25'	Stadium: Estadio Defensores del Chaco; Attendance: 28,531; Referee: Piero Maza (Chile)

14 November 2026 FIFA World Cup qualification	Paraguay	2–1	Argentina	Asunción, Paraguay
20:30 UTC−3	Sanabria 19'; Alderete 47'	Report	La. Martínez 11'	Stadium: Estadio Defensores del Chaco, Asunción; Attendance: 32,200; Referee: Anderson Daronco (Brazil)

19 November 2024 2026 FIFA World Cup qualification	Bolivia	2–2	Paraguay	El Alto, Bolivia
16:00 UTC−4	E. Vaca 15'; Terceros 80' (pen.)	Report	Almirón 71'; Enciso 90+1'	Stadium: Estadio Municipal de El Alto; Attendance: 18,655; Referee: Andrés Matonte (Uruguay)

== National women's team ==
The following table lists all the games played by the Paraguayan national women's team in official competitions and friendly matches during 2024.

16 February Friendly	Panama	2–0	Paraguay	Penonomé, Panama
20:00	Rangel 14'; Jaén 59'			Stadium: Estadio Universidad Latina

22 February W Gold Cup Group C	Costa Rica	0–1	Paraguay	Houston, United States
21:00 (20:00 UTC−6)		Report	Chamorro 51'	Stadium: Shell Energy Stadium; Referee: Odette Hamilton (Jamaica)

25 February W Gold Cup Group C	Paraguay	0–4	Canada	Houston, United States
17:00 (16:00 UTC−6)		Report	Leon 25', 49', 57'; Smith 39'	Stadium: Shell Energy Stadium; Referee: Katia García (Mexico)

28 February W Gold Cup Group C	Paraguay	3–2	El Salvador	Houston, United States
21:00 (20:00 UTC−6)	J. Martínez 18' (pen.), 86' (pen.), 90+1'	Report	Fisher 69'; Fuentes 83'	Stadium: Shell Energy Stadium; Referee: Karen Hernández (Mexico)

3 March W Gold Cup Quarter-finals	Mexico	3–2	Paraguay	Los Angeles, United States
17:00 (14:00 UTC−8)	Ovalle 31', 69'; Luna 49'	Report	Barbosa 64'; Fernández 72'	Stadium: BMO Stadium; Referee: Tori Penso (United States)

4 April Friendly	FC Barcelona (Spain)	7-0	Paraguay	Barcelona, Spain
11:15 UTC+2		Report		Stadium: Ciutat Esportiva Joan Gamper

7 April Friendly	Catalonia	5–1	Paraguay	Palamós, Spain
12:00 UTC+2	Aparicio 16'; Baudet 33'; Llompart 41'; Kanteh 51'; Losada 78'	Report	R. Fernández 50'	Stadium: Estadi Palamós Costa Brava; Attendance: 3,351; Referee: Cecilia Muñoz di Giovambattista (Spain)
