= List of football clubs in Paraguay =

This is a list of football clubs in Paraguay which are affiliated with the Asociación Paraguaya de Fútbol. As of the 2016 season, clubs are listed in rank of the Paraguayan football league system.

== Primera División Paraguaya ==
1. Cerro Porteño (Barrio Obrero)
2. Deportivo Capiatá (Capiatá), 2012 runner-up 2° Div.
3. General Diaz (Luque), 2012 champion 2° Div.
4. Guaraní (Dos Bocas)
5. Libertad (Asunción)
6. Nacional (Barrio Obrero)
7. Olimpia (Asunción)
8. Rubio Ñú (Santísima Trinidad)
9. Sportivo Luqueño (Luque)
10. Sol de América (Villa Elisa)
11. River Plate
12. General Caballero ZC (Zeballos Cué, Asunción)

== Division Intermedia ==
1. Club Atletico 3 de Febrero (Ciudad del Este)
2. Deportivo Caacupé (Caacupé) 2012 champion Primera Div. Nacional B
3. Cristóbal Colón (Ñemby)
4. Deportivo Santaní (San Estanislao)
5. Deportivo Caaguazú (Caaguazú)
6. Deportivo Liberación
7. Independiente F.B.C. (Campo Grande)
8. Fernando de la Mora (Fernando de la Mora)
9. Fulgencio Yegros (Ñemby)
10. Olimpia of Itá
11. Liga Ovetense (Coronel Oviedo)
12. Resistencia (Ricardo Brugada, Asunción)
13. San Lorenzo (San Lorenzo)
14. Sport Colombia (Fernando de la Mora)
15. Sportivo Iteño (Itá)
16. Sportivo Trinidense (Santísima Trinidad, Asunción)

== Tercera División Paraguaya ==
=== Primera División B Nacional ===
1. Sportivo Carapeguá (Carapeguá)
2. Paranaense F.C. (Alto Paraná)
3. Cerro Porteño PF (Presidente Franco)
4. Sol del Este (Ciudad del Este)
5. 4 de Octubre (Atyrá)
6. 22 de Septiembre (Encarnación)
7. 24 de Junio (San Juan Bautista)
8. Choré Central
9. Deportivo Beleano
10. Juventud Ypanense
11. Liga Concepcionera (Concepción)

=== Primera División B Metropolitana ===
1. 12 de Octubre Football Club (Itauguá), 2012 champion Primera B
2. Martín Ledesma (Capiatá), 2012 runner-up 3° Div.
3. Tacuary (Asunción)
4. Sportivo Ameliano (Barrio Jara, Asunción)
5. Sportivo Limpeño
6. Deportivo Recoleta
7. Cerro Corá (Campo Grande, Asunción)
8. Colegiales (Asunción)
9. Oriental (Ricardo Brugada, Asunción)
10. Benjamín Aceval (Villa Hayes), 2012 runner-up 4° Div.
11. Capitán Figari (Lambaré)
12. 29 de Setiembre
13. 3 de Febrero (Ricardo Brugada, Asunción)
14. 3 de Noviembre

== Cuarta División Paraguaya ==
=== Primera División C (Metropolitana) ===
1. Club 1° de Marzo (Fernando de la Mora)
2. Atlético Juventud (Loma Pytá, Asunción)
3. Atlético Tembetary (Ypané)
4. Deportivo Humaitá (Mariano Roque Alonso)
5. Deportivo Pinozá (Bernardino Caballero, Asunción)
6. Gral. Caballero SF (San Felipe, Asunción)
7. Silvio Pettirossi (Republicano, Asunción)
8. Pilcomayo F.B.C. (Mariano Roque Alonso)
9. Sport Colonial (Sta. Ana, Asunción)
10. Valois Rivarola (Zeballos Cué, Asunción)
11. Nikkei Bellmare (Itauguá) (disenrolled for one season)
12. Club 12 de Octubre SD (Santo Domingo, Asunción)
13. Atlántida (Barrio Obrero, Asunción), 2012 champion 4° Div.
14. Gral. Caballero CG (Campo Grande, Asunción)
15. Presidente Hayes (Tacumbú, Asunción)

=== Amambay ===
- América Foot Ball Club
- Club Aquidabán
- Club Atlético Bernardino Caballero
- Atlético Pedro Juan Caballero
- Club Deportivo 1º de Marzo
- General Diaz Foot Ball Club
- Club Sportivo 2 de Mayo
- Club Sportivo Obrero
- Independiente Fútbol Club
- Mariscal Estigarribia Fútbol Club
- 1º de Marzo
- 3 de Noviembre
- Atletico Amambay
- Deportivo Obrero
- Sargento Oliveira
- Capitán Bado
- Estrella del Norte
- 13 de junho
- 21 de setiembre
- General Eugenio Alejandrino Garay
- Independiente Bella Vista
- Sportivo Obrero
- San Antonio
- Sport Paraguay Fútbol Club

=== Boquerón ===
- Cerro Porteño Fortin Manuel Gondra
- Chaco Central
- Guaraní Lagunita
- Kaaguy Rory
- León Guaraní
- Olimpia Campo Acevalense
- Sport Santa Aurelia
- 28 de Setiembre Club 28 de Setiembre
- 29 de Setiembre Club 28 de Setiembre
- Atlético Aquidaban
- Atlético Juventud Mariscal José Felix Estigarribia
- Fortin Nanawa
- Atlético 13 Tuyuti
- Santa Teresita
- Nueva Estrella
- Cerro León Filadelfia
- 1º de Mayo Filadelfia
- Nativos del Chaco
- Olimpia Filadelfia
- Cerro Porteño Filadelfia
- Guaraní Filadelfia
- Sport Boqueron
- Nacional Filadelfia
- Naciones Unidas
- Loma Plata
- Fundacion de Asunción
- Alianza * Trebol
- 3 de Febrero Villa Choferes del Chaco
- Sport Ayoreo
- Cerro America del Sur
- 4 de Mayo
- 15 de Agosto
- Yalve Sanga
- Rivales
- León Guaraní Cayin ô Clim
- Colonias Unidas
- Heroes del Chaco
- Rubio Ñu Campo Alegre
- Misiones
- 3 Colonias
- Pioneros del Chaco
- Club Nacional Campo Largo
- 5 de Mayo
- Cerro Porteño Campo Lechuza
- Guaraní Campo Lechuza
- 6 de Abril
- Olimpia Neuland
- Santa Cecilia
- Nativos Pioneros de America
- Boqueron Betania
- Carlos Antonio Lopez
- Olimpia Samaria
- Guaraní Galilea
- Mariscal Lopez Tiberia
- Casuarina
- Cerro Corá Abundancia
- Deportivo Campo Nuevo
