= 2024 Paraguayan Primera B Metropolitana =

Primera División B Metropolitana
- Season: 2024
- Dates: 12 April - 20 October 2024
- Champions: Deportivo Capiatá
- Promoted: Deportivo Capiatá and River Plate
- Relegated: Cristóbal Colón ÑEM and 12 de Octubre SDO

The 2024 Primera División B, or Primera División B Metropolitana in order to distinguish it from the 2024 Paraguayan Primera B Nacional, was the eighty-first season of the Primera División B Metropolitana, one of the three leagues of Paraguay's Tercera División, the third-tier of the country's football league system, in which clubs from the Asunción metropolitan area take part. In this edition a total of 18 teams competed.

The champion and runner-up of the tournament directly get promoted to the Second Division, the División Intermedia.

== Teams and locations ==
Team	Home city	Stadium	Capacity
3 de Febrero	Asunción	3 de Febrero	500
3 de Noviembre	Asunción	Rubén Ramírez	1,500
12 de Octubre ITG	Itauguá	Luis Alberto Salinas Tanasio	10,000
12 de Octubre SDO	Asunción	Rafael Giménez	1,500
24 de Setiembre	Areguá	Próculo Cortázar	2,500
29 de Setiembre	Luque	Salustiano Zaracho	3,500
Atlántida	Asunción	Flaviano Díaz	1,000
Benjamín Aceval	Villa Hayes	Isidro Roussillón	5,000
Cristóbal Colón JAS	Julián Augusto Saldívar	Herminio Ricardo	3,000
Cristóbal Colón ÑEM	Ñemby	Pablo Patricio Bogarín	2,500
Deportivo Capiatá	Capiatá	Erico Galeano	15,000
General Díaz	Luque	General Adrián Jara	4,000
Olimpia de Itá	Itá	Presbítero Manuel Gamarra	5,000
Presidente Hayes	Asunción	Félix Cabrera	5,000
River Plate	Asunción	Jardines del Kelito	6,500
Silvio Pettirossi	Asunción	Bernabé Pedrozo	4,000
Sportivo Limpeño	Limpio	Optaciano Gómez	1,800
Sport Colombia	Fernando de la Mora	Alfonso Colmán	7,000

=== Geographical distribution ===
Department	Number	Teams
Central	10	12 de Octubre ITG (Itauguá), 24 de Setiembre (Areguá), 29 de Septiembre (Luque), Cristóbal Colón (Julián Augusto Saldívar), Cristóbal Colón (Ñemby), Deportivo Capiatá (Capiatá), Mariano Roque Alonso), General Díaz (Luque), Olimpia (Itá), Sport Colombia (Fernando de la Mora), Sportivo Limpeño (Limpio).
Asunción	7	3 de Febrero FBC, 3 de Noviembre, 12 de Octubre SDO, Atlántida, Presidente Hayes, River Plate and Silvio Pettirossi.
Presidente Hayes	1	Benjamín Aceval (Villa Hayes).

== Competition system ==
The mode of dispute would be maintained as in previous seasons, round-robin matches, that is, two rounds made up of 18 matchdays each. The team that accumulates the most points at the end of the 36th matchday dates will be crowned champion.
In case of parity of points between two contestants, the title is defined in an extra match. If there are more than two in dispute, it is resolved according to the following parameters:

1) Goal difference;
2) Most goals scored;
3) Greater number of goals scored as a visitor;
4) Raffle.

== Standings ==
Pos	Team	Pld	W	D	L	GF	GA	GD	Pts	Qualification
1	Deportivo Capiatá (C, P)	34	22	9	3	63	31	+32	75	Promotion to División Intermedia
2	River Plate (P)	34	18	13	3	56	28	+28	67	Promotion to División Intermedia
3	Atlántida	34	19	7	8	41	27	+14	64	
4	Benjamín Aceval	34	18	7	9	65	35	+30	61	
5	12 de Octubre ITG	34	15	13	6	45	34	+11	58	
6	Cristóbal Colón JAS	34	17	6	11	62	43	+19	57	
7	24 de Setiembre	34	15	11	8	60	41	+19	56	
8	Olimpia de Itá	34	12	13	9	47	41	+6	49	
9	3 de Febrero FBC	34	13	9	12	45	44	+1	48	
10	3 de Noviembre	34	12	8	14	50	37	+13	44	
11	Sport Colombia	34	12	8	14	40	43	−3	44	
12	Silvio Pettirossi	34	9	8	17	43	49	−6	35	
13	Sportivo Limpeño	34	8	10	16	37	50	−13	34	
14	General Díaz	34	8	8	18	32	54	−22	32	
15	Presidente Hayes	34	7	10	17	32	59	−27	31	
16	29 de Setiembre	34	7	9	18	38	72	−34	30	
17	12 de Octubre SDO	34	6	11	17	43	61	−18	29	
18	Cristóbal Colón ÑEM	34	4	8	22	36	86	−50	20	

Source: APF
(C) Champions; (P) Promoted

== Relegation ==
Relegation is determined at the end of the season by computing an average of the number of points earned per game over the past three seasons. The two teams with the lowest average will be relegated to the Primera División C for the following season.
