= 2023 Paraguayan Primera B Metropolitana =

Primera División B Metropolitana
- Season: 2023
- Dates: 7 April - 7 November 2023
- Champions: Tembetary
- Promoted: Tembetary
- Relegated: Iteño, Humaitá

The 2023 Primera División B, or Primera División B Metropolitana in order to distinguish it from the 2023 Paraguayan Primera B Nacional, was the eightieth season of the Primera División B Metropolitana, one of the three leagues of Paraguay's Tercera División, the third-tier of the country's football league system, in which clubs from the Asunción metropolitan area and Central Department take part. In this edition a total of 17 teams competed.

The champion of the tournament directly get promoted to the Second Division, the División Intermedia. The runner-up have the right to dispute the third place for promotion with the champion of the Primera B Nacional.

== Teams and locations ==
Team	Home city	Stadium	Capacity
3 de Febrero FBC	Asunción	3 de Febrero	500
29 de Setiembre	Luque	Salustiano Zaracho	3,500
3 de Noviembre	Asunción	Rubén Ramírez	1,500
Atlántida	Asunción	Flaviano Díaz	1,000
Benjamín Aceval	Villa Hayes	Isidro Roussillón	5,000
Cristóbal Colón	Julián Augusto Saldívar	Herminio Ricardo	3,000
Cristóbal Colón	Ñemby	Pablo Patricio Bogarín	2,500
Deportivo Capiatá	Capiatá	Erico Galeano	15,000
Deportivo Humaitá	Mariano Roque Alonso	Pioneros de Corumba Cué	4,500
General Díaz	Luque	General Adrián Jara	4,000
Olimpia	Itá	Presbítero Manuel Gamarra	5,000
Presidente Hayes	Asunción	Félix Cabrera	5,000
River Plate	Asunción	Jardines del Kelito	6,500
Silvio Pettirossi	Asunción	Bernabé Pedrozo	4,000
Sportivo Iteño	Itá	Salvador Morga	4,500
Sportivo Limpeño	Limpio	Optaciano Gómez	1,800
Tembetary	Asunción	Complejo Tembetary	500

=== Geographical distribution ===
Department	Number	Teams
Asunción	7	3 de Febrero FBC, 3 de Noviembre, Atlántida, Presidente Hayes, River Plate, Silvio Pettirossi, and Tembetary.
Central Department	9	29 de Septiembre (Luque), Cristóbal Colón (Julián Augusto Saldívar), Cristóbal Colón (Ñemby), Deportivo Capiatá (Capiatá), Deportivo Humaitá (Mariano Roque Alonso), General Díaz (Luque), Olimpia (Itá), Sportivo Iteño (Itá), Sportivo Limpeño (Limpio).
Presidente Hayes Department	1	Benjamín Aceval (Villa Hayes).

== Competition system ==
The mode of dispute would be maintained as in previous seasons, round-robin matches, that is, two rounds made up of 17 matchdays each. The team that accumulates the most points at the end of the 34th matchday dates will be crowned champion.
In case of parity of points between two contestants, the title is defined in an extra match. If there are more than two in dispute, it is resolved according to the following parameters:

1) Goal difference;
2) Most goals scored;
3) Greater number of goals scored as a visitor;
4) Raffle.

== Standings ==
Pos	Team	Pld	W	D	L	GF	GA	GD	Pts	Qualification
1	Atlético Tembetary	32	21	5	6	63	34	+29	68	Promotion to División Intermedia
2	Cristóbal Colón JAS	32	20	7	5	60	25	+35	67	Playoff for promotion to División Intermedia
3	River Plate	32	17	9	6	52	36	+16	60	
4	Benjamín Aceval	32	17	8	7	71	32	+39	59	
5	General Díaz	32	15	5	12	49	50	−1	50	
6	Silvio Pettirossi	32	13	9	10	52	55	−3	48	
7	3 de Noviembre	32	13	8	11	62	56	+6	47	
8	Deportivo Capiatá	32	13	6	13	36	42	−6	45	
9	Olimpia (Itá)	32	12	6	14	54	52	+2	42	
10	Sportivo Limpeño	32	11	8	13	47	46	+1	41	
11	Atlántida	32	9	13	10	41	38	+3	40	
12	3 de Febrero FBC	32	10	8	14	40	52	−12	38	
13	Presidente Hayes	32	8	11	13	38	48	−10	35	
14	Cristóbal Colón (Ñ)	32	8	7	17	44	72	−28	31	
15	Sportivo Iteño	32	7	8	17	41	60	−19	29	
16	Deportivo Humaitá	32	7	5	20	35	57	−22	26	
17	29 de Setiembre	32	7	5	20	25	55	−30	26	

Source: APF

== Relegation ==
Relegation is determined at the end of the season by computing an average of the number of points earned per game over the past three seasons. The two teams with the lowest average will be relegated to the Primera División C for the following season.

Pos	Team	Avg	Total Pts	Total Pld	2021 Pts	2022 Pts	2023 Pts	Relegation
1º	River Plate	1.875	60	32	-	-	60	
2º	Atlético Tembetary	1.872	176	94	49	59	68	
4º	Benjamín Aceval	1.844	59	32	-	-	59	
6º	Cristóbal Colón JAS	1.649	155	94	53	35	67	
3º	General Díaz	1.609	103	64	-	53	50	
5º	Deportivo Capiatá	1.547	99	64	-	54	45	
7º	3 de Noviembre	1.500	141	94	36	58	47	
8º	Atlántida	1.415	133	94	32	61	40	
10º	Silvio Pettirossi	1.359	87	64	-	39	48	
9º	Presidente Hayes	1.319	124	94	43	46	35	
11º	Olimpia (Itá)	1.245	117	94	39	36	42	
13º	Cristóbal Colón (Ñ)	1.160	109	94	41	37	31	
12º	29 de Septiembre	1.149	108	94	45	37	26	
15º	3 de Febrero FBC	1.053	99	94	33	28	38	
14º	Sportivo Limpeño	1.021	96	94	38	17	41	
17º	Sportivo Iteño	0.906	29	32	-	-	29	Relegation to Primera División C
16º	Deportivo Humaitá	0.813	26	32	-	-	26	Relegation to Primera División C

Source: APF
