= 2026 APF División Intermedia =

División Intermedia
- Season: 2026
- Dates: 4 April – 26 October 2026
- Champions: Deportivo Santaní (1st title)
- Promoted: Deportivo Santaní; General Caballero (JLM)
- Relegated: Fernando de la Mora; Tacuary; 3 de Noviembre
- Matches: 240
- Goals: 635 (2.65 per match)
- Top goalscorer: Osvaldo Argüello (20 goals)
- Biggest home win: Gral. Caballero 6–2 Spvo. Carapeguá (6 April)
- Biggest away win: Guaireña 0–4 Benjamín Aceval (4 April); 3 de Noviembre 0–4 Dep. Santaní (11 July); 12 de Junio 0–4 Independiente (20 September)
- Highest scoring: Gral. Caballero 6–2 Spvo. Carapeguá (6 April)

The 2026 División Intermedia season was the 108th season of the second-tier league of Paraguayan football and the 29th under the División Intermedia name. The season began on 4 April and ended on 26 October 2026, and the fixtures for the season were drawn on 13 March 2026.

The champions and runners-up were promoted to the APF División de Honor for the following season, whilst the bottom three teams in the relegation table at the end of the season were relegated to the third-tier leagues of Paraguayan football.

Deportivo Santaní became the first team promoted to the top flight with one match left, following a 2–0 win over 3 de Noviembre on 19 October 2026, and clinched their first División Intermedia title on the final matchday of the season after defeating Fernando de la Mora 3–1 on 25 October, while on that same day General Caballero (JLM) claimed the last promotion spot available after a scoreless draw with 12 de Junio.

On the other hand, Fernando de la Mora, Tacuary, and 3 de Noviembre were relegated to Primera B Metropolitana with one match to go on 19 October, after 3 de Noviembre's loss to Deportivo Santaní was coupled with a win for Encarnación against General Caballero (JLM).

== Teams ==
=== Team changes ===
Sixteen teams competed in the season: 11 teams from the previous División Intermedia season plus the two teams relegated from the División de Honor in its 2025 season (General Caballero (JLM) and Tembetary), the 2025 Primera B Metropolitana champions Benjamín Aceval, Paraguarí Atlético Club, who were established as a club from the team representing the Paraguarí football league which won the 2024–25 Campeonato Nacional de Interligas, and the Primera B Metropolitana runners-up 3 de Noviembre, who defeated the 2025 Primera B Nacional champions 15 de Mayo from Itapé in a promotion play-off series.

These teams replaced Rubio Ñu and San Lorenzo, both promoted to the top flight at the end of the previous season, as well as River Plate, Pastoreo, and Guaraní de Fram, who were relegated to the third-tier leagues.

Promoted to 2026 Copa de Primera	Relegated from 2025 Copa de Primera	Promoted from 2025 Tercera División	Relegated to 2026 Tercera División
Rubio Ñu; San Lorenzo	General Caballero (JLM); Tembetary	Benjamín Aceval (Primera B Metropolitana); Paraguarí (Campeonato Nacional de Interligas); 3 de Noviembre (Primera B Metropolitana/Primera B Nacional promotion play-off winners)	River Plate (Primera B Metropolitana); Pastoreo (Primera B Nacional); Guaraní (F) (Primera B Nacional)

=== Stadia and locations ===
Locations of the 2026 División Intermedia teams

Team	City	Stadium	Capacity
3 de Noviembre	Asunción	Rubén Ramírez	3,500
12 de Junio	Villa Hayes	Facundo de León Fossati	5,000
Benjamín Aceval	Villa Hayes	Isidro Roussillón	5,000
Deportivo Capiatá	Capiatá	Erico Galeano	10,000
Deportivo Santaní	San Estanislao	Juan José Vázquez	8,000
Encarnación	Encarnación	Villa Alegre	16,000
Fernando de la Mora	Asunción	Emiliano Ghezzi	6,000
General Caballero (JLM)	Juan León Mallorquín	Ka'arendy	10,000
Guaireña	Villarrica	Parque del Guairá	11,000
Independiente (CG)	Asunción	Ricardo Gregor	4,000
Paraguarí	Carapeguá	Municipal de Carapeguá (Note: Used as home stadium for the season since Paraguarí's stadium Estadio General Bruguez in Paraguarí did not meet APF requirements.)	10,000
Resistencia	Asunción	Tomás Beggan Correa	3,500
Sol de América	Villa Elisa	Luis Alfonso Giagni	11,000
Sportivo Carapeguá	Carapeguá	Municipal de Carapeguá	10,000
Tacuary	Asunción	Toribio Vargas	3,000
Tembetary	Villa Elisa	Luis Alfonso Giagni (Note: Used as home stadium for the season since Tembetary's stadium Complejo Tembetary in Villa Elisa did not meet APF requirements.)	11,000

== Standings ==
Pos	Team	Pld	W	D	L	GF	GA	GD	Pts	Qualification
1	Deportivo Santaní (C, P)	30	19	3	8	52	28	+24	60	Promotion to División de Honor
2	General Caballero (JLM) (P)	30	17	6	7	58	37	+21	57	Promotion to División de Honor
3	12 de Junio	30	15	10	5	39	28	+11	55	
4	Paraguarí	30	14	5	11	45	38	+7	47	
5	Sol de América	30	10	15	5	37	30	+7	45	
6	Independiente (CG)	30	11	10	9	46	41	+5	43 (Note: Tied on head-to-head points (3). Head-to-head goal difference: Independiente (CG) +1, Sportivo Carapeguá −1.)	
7	Sportivo Carapeguá	30	12	7	11	37	43	−6	43	
8	Resistencia	30	11	9	10	39	36	+3	42 (Note: Tied on head-to-head points (3). Head-to-head goal difference: Resistencia +1, Benjamín Aceval −1.)	
9	Benjamín Aceval	30	12	6	12	45	44	+1	42	
10	Deportivo Capiatá	30	9	11	10	39	39	0	38	
11	Tembetary	30	10	7	13	41	48	−7	37	
12	Fernando de la Mora	30	9	7	14	33	45	−12	34	
13	3 de Noviembre	30	7	9	14	38	46	−8	30	
14	Guaireña	30	7	8	15	23	38	−15	29	
15	Tacuary	30	5	12	13	35	52	−17	27	
16	Encarnación	30	7	5	18	30	44	−14	26	

Source: APF, Soccerway
Rules for classification: 1) Points, 2) Head-to-head points, 3) Head-to-head goal difference, 4) Overall goal difference, 5) Goals for, 6) Playoff game (if needed to decide championship between two teams) or Drawing of lots (if three teams or more are tied).
(C) Champions; (P) Promoted

== Results ==
Home \ Away	3NO	12J	BEA	CAP	SAN	ENC	FDM	GCM	GUA	IND	PAR	RES	SOL	SPC	TAC	TEM
3 de Noviembre	—	1–1	1–1	0–0	0–4	2–2	3–2	2–3	1–1	5–2	1–1	1–1	1–0	0–1	2–2	3–0
12 de Junio	1–0	—	1–2	1–1	2–4	1–0	2–0	1–0	2–0	0–4	3–2	3–2	1–1	0–1	2–2	1–1
Benjamín Aceval	2–1	1–1	—	1–1	2–3	1–0	0–1	0–0	1–1	2–3	1–3	2–0	0–1	2–0	3–2	2–1
Deportivo Capiatá	4–3	0–0	3–1	—	0–1	1–0	2–1	2–1	0–0	2–2	3–1	1–1	1–4	5–2	3–0	1–3
Deportivo Santaní	2–0	0–2	0–2	1–0	—	1–0	2–3	2–1	1–0	1–2	2–0	3–0	3–0	2–0	0–0	3–4
Encarnación	2–1	0–2	1–3	3–1	1–3	—	0–0	3–2	1–2	2–3	0–1	0–3	2–3	2–2	1–1	0–2
Fernando de la Mora	2–2	1–1	2–1	1–0	1–3	0–2	—	0–2	1–3	1–1	2–2	2–1	0–1	0–1	1–1	1–0
General Caballero (JLM)	1–3	0–0	2–0	2–1	2–1	1–0	2–3	—	0–0	4–2	3–2	2–1	3–2	6–2	4–1	2–1
Guaireña	2–1	0–1	0–4	3–1	0–2	1–0	0–2	0–3	—	1–2	1–0	0–0	0–1	0–0	2–0	0–0
Independiente (CG)	2–0	1–2	1–2	1–1	0–2	1–0	0–0	0–0	2–0	—	1–3	1–1	1–0	0–1	2–2	3–0
Paraguarí	1–0	0–1	1–2	2–1	3–0	0–1	2–0	3–2	3–1	3–2	—	1–0	1–1	1–0	0–1	1–1
Resistencia	1–2	1–1	5–2	1–0	1–2	1–0	3–1	2–2	2–1	0–0	2–0	—	1–3	1–1	3–1	1–3
Sol de América	2–0	1–0	1–1	1–1	0–0	2–0	3–2	1–1	1–1	1–1	0–0	0–0	—	2–4	1–1	1–1
Sportivo Carapeguá	2–1	1–3	2–0	1–1	1–0	1–3	2–0	1–2	2–1	0–2	2–3	1–2	1–1	—	0–0	1–0
Tacuary	0–1	1–2	2–1	0–0	0–3	2–2	1–2	0–2	1–0	3–2	2–4	0–1	1–1	2–2	—	4–2
Tembetary	1–0	0–1	4–3	1–2	1–1	0–2	2–1	1–3	3–2	2–2	2–1	0–1	1–1	1–2	3–2	—

Source: APF, Soccerway
Legend: Blue = home team win; Yellow = draw; Red = away team win.

== Top scorers ==
Rank	Player	Club	Goals
1	(Paraguay) Osvaldo Argüello	Benjamín Aceval	20
2	(Paraguay) Diego Martínez	Tembetary / 3 de Noviembre	16
3	(Paraguay) Jorge Benítez	Deportivo Capiatá	14
4	(Paraguay) Jorge Colmán	General Caballero (JLM)	12
5	(Paraguay) Víctor Velazco	Paraguarí	11
6	(Paraguay) Héctor Lezcano	12 de Junio	10
6	(Paraguay) Juan Mereles	Deportivo Santaní	10
6	(Paraguay) Edgar Villalba	Deportivo Santaní	10
6	(Paraguay) Roland Escobar	Paraguarí	10
10	(Paraguay) Daniel Dietze	Independiente (CG)	9

Source: APF

== Relegation ==
Relegation was determined at the end of the season by computing an average of the total of points earned per game over the past three seasons. The three teams with the lowest average were relegated to Primera División B or Primera División B Nacional for the following season, depending on their geographical location, with teams from Asunción or located within 50 kilometres of Asunción relegating to the former, while teams from outside Greater Asunción and the Central Department are relegated to the latter third-tier league.

Pos	Team	2024 Pts	2025 Pts	2026 Pts	Total Pts	Total Pld	Avg	Relegation
1	General Caballero (JLM)	—	—	57	57	30	1.9	
2	12 de Junio	38	48	55	141	90	1.567	
3	Paraguarí	—	—	47	47	30	1.567	
4	Deportivo Santaní	42	35	60	137	90	1.522	
5	Deportivo Capiatá	—	52	38	90	60	1.5	
6	Sportivo Carapeguá	58	34	43	135	90	1.5	
7	Resistencia	45	40	42	127	90	1.411	
8	Benjamín Aceval	—	—	42	42	30	1.4	
9	Sol de América	—	38	45	83	60	1.383	
10	Independiente (CG)	38	34	43	115	90	1.278	
11	Tembetary	—	—	37	37	30	1.233	
12	Guaireña	38	39	29	106	90	1.178	
13	Encarnación	44	35	26	105	90	1.167	
14	Tacuary (R)	—	38	27	65	60	1.083	Relegation to Primera B Metropolitana
15	Fernando de la Mora (R)	35	28	34	97	90	1.078	Relegation to Primera B Metropolitana
16	3 de Noviembre (R)	—	—	30	30	30	1	Relegation to Primera B Metropolitana

Source: APF.

== See also ==
- 2026 Copa de Primera
- 2026 Copa Paraguay
