= Manuel Maciel =

Paraguayan footballer (born 1984)

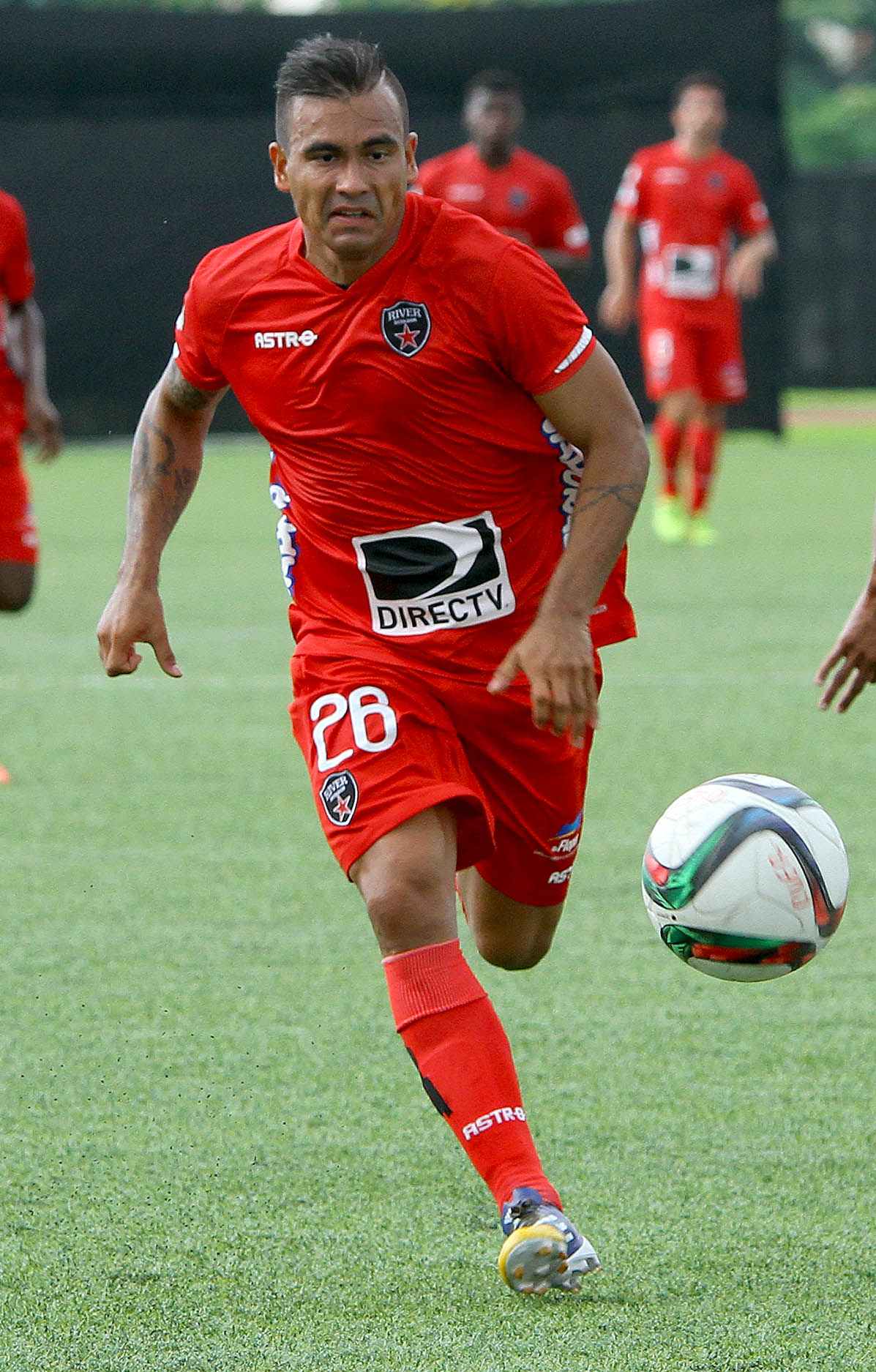
- Maciel with River Ecuador in 2015

Personal information
- Full name: Manuel José Maciel Fernández
- Date of birth: 12 February 1984 (age 42)
- Place of birth: Asunción, Paraguay
- Height: 1.72 m (5 ft 8 in)
- Position: Striker

Team information
- Current team: Benjamín Aceval

Senior career*
Years	Team	Apps	(Gls)
2004	Universal		
2005	Tacuary		
2005	Olimpia	1	(0)
2006	Fernández Vial	29	(14)
2007–2008	Universidad de Concepción	28	(11)
2008	→ Toluca (loan)	12	(2)
2008	→ Libertad (loan)		
2009–2014	Libertad	122	(41)
2012	→ Deportes Tolima (loan)	6	(1)
2014	→ Sportivo Luqueño (loan)	13	(2)
2015	River Ecuador	31	(3)
2016	River Plate Asunción	15	(1)
2016	General Díaz	14	(0)
2017	Mushuc Runa	33	(7)
2018	General Caballero ZC	15	(6)
2018	River Plate Asunción		
2018–2019	Sportivo San Lorenzo	24	(7)
2021	Cristóbal Colón		
2021	Tembetary		
2023	3 de Noviembre		
2024–	Benjamín Aceval		

International career
2008	Paraguay	1	(0)
- * Club domestic league appearances and goals as of 12 November 2024

Manuel José Maciel Fernández (born 12 February 1984) is a Paraguayan footballer who currently plays for Benjamín Aceval as a striker.

== Club career ==
=== Early career / Chile ===
Maciel's career took off in 2007 when he played for Universidad de Concepción.

=== Toluca ===
He was signed by Mexican club Toluca. On 22 February 2008, he scored the winning goal for Toluca in his debut.

=== Libertad ===
Maciel signed with Club Libertad during the second half of 2008, on loan from Universidad de Concepción.

== International career ==
In 2008, he was called up to the Paraguay national football team.
