= Osvaldo Mendoza =

Paraguayan footballer (born 1981)

Personal information
- Full name: Osvaldo Martín Mendoza Sosa
- Date of birth: 23 March 1981 (age 45)
- Place of birth: Asunción, Paraguay
- Height: 1.88 m (6 ft 2 in)
- Position: Forward

Youth career
- 1989–1999: Cerro Porteño

Senior career*
Years	Team	Apps	(Gls)
1999–2001	San Lorenzo		
2002	Tacuary		
2003	Deportivo Recoleta	10	(4)
2004	Tembetary		
2005	3 de Febrero		
2006	Sportivo Trinidense	12	(3)
2006–2007	Textil Mandiyú		
2008	Club Silvio Pettirossi		
2008–2009	FAS	8	(9)
2009	Isidro Metapán		
2010–2011	Sportivo Trinidense		
2011–2012	Club Sport Colombia	14	(9)
- * Club domestic league appearances and goals

Osvaldo Mendoza (born 23 March 1981) is a Paraguayan former professional footballer who played as a forward.
