= Primera División B Metropolitana =

Primera División B
- Founded: 1939
- Country: Paraguay
- Confederation: CONMEBOL
- Number of clubs: 17
- Level on pyramid: 3
- Promotion to: División Intermedia
- Relegation to: Primera C
- Domestic cup: Copa Paraguay
- Current champions: Benjamín Aceval (2025)
- Most championships: Club Silvio Pettirossi (7 titles)
- Broadcaster(s): Tigo Sports & Tigo Max (One game per matchday)
- Current: 2026 season

The Primera División B (First Division B: in English), also known as Primera División B Metropolitana or simply Primera B Metropolitana in order to distinguish it from the Primera División B Nacional, is the metropolitan tournament of the Paraguayan Tercera División. Only teams from the Gran Asunción metropolitan area and Central Department take part in this third division league. Teams from all other parts of Paraguay that are not part of the Gran Asunción area play the Primera División B Nacional tournament in order to get promoted to the Paraguayan Division Intermedia.

It is being played since 1939. Since that year, the number of teams, rules and names for the tournament have changed, but as of now it is called "Primera División C" (and no more "Primera de Ascenso"). For the 2021 season, 17 teams take part.

The champion of this league gains the right to participate in the Paraguayan División Intermedia and the second placed team plays a play-off game against the second placed team of the Primera División B Nacional (country third division tournament), to decide who will play in Paraguay's second division of football. The last one or two teams are relegated to the fourth division (called "Primera División C") for teams from Gran Asunción.

== Teams (2023) ==
Team	Home city	Stadium	Capacity
3 de Febrero FBC	Asunción	3 de Febrero	500
29 de Setiembre	Luque	Salustiano Zaracho	3,500
3 de Noviembre	Asunción	Rubén Ramírez	1,500
Atlántida	Asunción	Flaviano Díaz	1,000
Benjamín Aceval	Villa Hayes	Isidro Roussillón	5,000
Cristóbal Colón	Julián Augusto Saldívar	Herminio Ricardo	3,000
Cristóbal Colón	Ñemby	Pablo Patricio Bogarín	2,500
Deportivo Capiatá	Capiatá	Erico Galeano	15,000
Deportivo Humaitá	Mariano Roque Alonso	Pioneros de Corumba Cué	4,500
General Díaz	Luque	General Adrián Jara	4,000
Olimpia de Itá	Itá	Presbítero Manuel Gamarra	5,000
Presidente Hayes	Asunción	Félix Cabrera	5,000
River Plate	Asunción	Jardines del Kelito	6,500
Silvio Pettirossi	Asunción	Bernabé Pedrozo	4,000
Sportivo Iteño	Itá	Salvador Morga	4,500
Sportivo Limpeño	Limpio	Optaciano Gómez	1,800
Tembetary	Asunción	Complejo Tembetary	500

=== Geographical distribution ===
Department	Number	Teams
Asunción	7	3 de Febrero FBC, 3 de Noviembre, Atlántida, Presidente Hayes, River Plate, Silvio Pettirossi, and Tembetary.
Central Department	9	29 de Septiembre (Luque), Cristóbal Colón (Julián Augusto Saldívar), Cristóbal Colón (Ñemby), Deportivo Capiatá (Capiatá), Deportivo Humaitá (Mariano Roque Alonso), General Díaz (Luque), Olimpia (Itá), Sportivo Iteño (Itá), Sportivo Limpeño (Limpio).
Presidente Hayes Department	1	Benjamín Aceval (Villa Hayes).

== List of champions ==
=== Tercera División ===
Season	Champion
1939	Deportivo Pinozá
1940	Deportivo Pinozá
1941	Rubio Ñú
1942	Rubio Ñú
1943	12 de Octubre (Villa Aurelia)
1944	Sport Colombia B
1945	Championship not played
1946	Championship not played
1947	Championship not played
1948	Deportivo Pinozá
1949	Fernando de la Mora
1950	Fernando de la Mora
1951	General Caballero (SF)

=== Segunda de Ascenso ===
Season	Champion
1952	Silvio Pettirossi
1953	Tacuary
1954	Championship not finished
1955	Atlético Tembetary
1956	Cerro Corá
1957	Silvio Pettirossi
1958	Fernando de la Mora
1959	Sportivo Ameliano
1960	Atlántida
1961	Tacuary
1962	Independiente
1963	Oriental
1964	Atlético Juventud
1965	12 de Octubre (SD)
1966	24 de Setiembre
1967	Oriental
1968	Cerro Corá
1969	Sport Colombia
1970	12 de Octubre (Villa Aurelia)
1971	Deportivo Recoleta
1972	3 de Febrero
1973	Silvio Pettirossi
1974	Silvio Pettirossi
1975	Independiente
1976	Cerro Corá
1977	Capitán Figari
1978	Atlántida
1979	Atlético Colegiales
1980	Independiente
1981	Atlántida
1982	Sportivo Trinidense
1983	Tacuary
1984	Silvio Pettirossi
1985	Sportivo Iteño
1986	Valois Rivarola
1987	Sportivo Trinidense
1988	Deportivo Humaitá
1989	8 de Diciembre (Caacupé)
1990	Sportivo Trinidense
1991	Valois Rivarola
1992	Tembetary
1993	General Caballero
1994	General Caballero (CG)
1995	Silvio Pettirossi
1996	Atlético Juventud

=== Primera de Ascenso ===
Season	Champion	Runner-up
1997	12 de Octubre (SD)	Oriental
1998	Oriental	Silvio Pettirossi
1999	Tacuary	Independiente
2000	General Caballero	Atlético Juventud
2001	Independiente	General Caballero (CG)
2002	Sportivo Trinidense	General Caballero (CG)
2003	Fernando de la Mora	Silvio Pettirossi
2004	Silvio Pettirossi	General Díaz
2005	Rubio Ñú	Sportivo Trinidense
2006	Presidente Hayes	General Díaz
2007	Sport Colombia	San Lorenzo

=== Primera División B ===
Season	Champion	Runner-up
2008	Atlético Colegiales (Lambaré)	Independiente
2009	San Lorenzo	Cerro Corá
2010	River Plate	Martín Ledesma
2011	29 de Setiembre	Resistencia
2012	12 de Octubre (Itauguá)	Martín Ledesma
2013	Olimpia (Itá)	Sportivo Iteño
2014	Cristóbal Colón	Fernando de la Mora
2015	Olimpia (Itá)	Fulgencio Yegros
2016	Martín Ledesma	Sportivo Ameliano
2017	Sportivo San Lorenzo	Atlético Colegiales
2018	12 de Octubre (Itauguá)	Tacuary
2019	Sportivo Ameliano	Tacuary
2020	Championship not played due to the COVID-19 pandemic	
2021	Atlético Colegiales	Martín Ledesma
2022	Deportivo Recoleta	24 de Setiembre (VP)
2023	Tembetary	Cristóbal Colón (JAS)
2024	Deportivo Capiatá	River Plate
2025	Benjamín Aceval	3 de Noviembre

== Titles by club ==
Club	Titles	Seasons won
Silvio Pettirossi	7	1952, 1957, 1973, 1974, 1984, 1995, 2004
Fernando de la Mora	4	1949, 1950, 1953, 2003
Tacuary	4	1953, 1961, 1983, 1999
Independiente	4	1962, 1975, 1980, 2001
Sportivo Trinidense	4	1982, 1987, 1990, 2002
Deportivo Pinozá	3	1939, 1940, 1948
Cerro Corá	3	1956, 1968, 1976
Atlántida	3	1960, 1978, 1981
Oriental	3	1963, 1967, 1998
Atlético Colegiales	3	1979, 2008, 2021
Tembetary	3	1955, 1992, 2023
12 de Octubre (Villa Aurelia)	2	1943, 1970
12 de Octubre (SD)	2	1965, 1997
Valois Rivarola	2	1986, 1991
General Caballero	2	1993, 2000
Rubio Ñu	2	1941, 1942
Atlético Juventud	2	1964, 1996
Sport Colombia	2	1969, 2007
Olimpia de Itá	2	2013, 2015
Sportivo San Lorenzo	2	2009, 2017
12 de Octubre (Itauguá)	2	2012, 2018
Sportivo Ameliano	2	1959, 2019
Recoleta	2	1971, 2022
General Caballero (SF)	1	1951
24 de Septiembre	1	1966
Rubio Ñu	1	2005
Capitán Figari	1	1977
3 de Febrero	1	1972
Sportivo Iteño	1	1985
Deportivo Humaitá	1	1988
8 de Diciembre (Caacupé)	1	1989
General Caballero CG	1	1994
Presidente Hayes	1	2006
River Plate	1	2010
29 de Septiembre	1	2011
Benjamín Aceval	1	2025
Cristóbal Colón	1	2014
Deportivo Capiatá	1	2024
Martín Ledesma	1	2016
Sport Colombia B	1	1944

== List of goalscorers ==
Season	Player	Club	Goals
2008	(Paraguay) Osvaldo Duarte	Independiente CG	13
2007	(Paraguay) Victor Aquino	Sportivo San Lorenzo	13
2006	(Paraguay) Carlos Borja	Cerro Cora	14
2005	(Paraguay) José Leguizamón	Sportivo Trinidense	20
2004	(Paraguay) Sabino Leiva	Atlético Tembetary	19
