= Fabrizio Jara =

Paraguayan footballer

Personal information
- Full name: Fabrizio Jesús Jara Ledesma
- Date of birth: 19 August 2002 (age 24)
- Place of birth: Paraguay
- Height: 1.76 m (5 ft 9 in)
- Position: Midfielder

Team information
- Current team: Club Nacional (Paraguay)
- Number: 40

Youth career
- –2023: Club Cerro Porteño

Senior career*
Years	Team	Apps	(Gls)
2023	Club Cerro Porteño	3	(0)
2024–	Club Nacional (Paraguay)	43	(2)
- * Club domestic league appearances and goals as of 13 August 2025

Fabrizio Jesús Jara Ledesma (born 19 August 2002) is a Paraguayan professional footballer who plays as a midfielder for Club Nacional (Paraguay) in the Paraguayan Primera División.

== Club career ==
Fabrizio Jara developed as a footballer in the youth divisions of Club Cerro Porteño. He made his professional debut in the Paraguayan Primera División on 1 December 2023, coming on as a substitute in the second half of a 4–0 victory over Club Guaraní.

In 2024, he joined Club Nacional (Paraguay), where he continues his professional career.

== Career statistics ==
=== Club ===
Season	Club	League	Apps.	Goals	Domestic Cups	Apps.	Goals	International Cups	Apps.	Goals	Total	Apps.	Goals
2023	Club Cerro Porteño	PD	1	0	CP	1	0	CL	--	--	--	--	
2024	Club Nacional (Paraguay)	PD	24	2	CP	3	0	CL	--	--	--	--	
2025	Club Nacional (Paraguay)	PD	3	0	CP	0	0	CL	--	--	--	--	
Career Total			28	2		4	0		--	--		--	--
