= Santo Domingo (Asunción) =

- Barrio
- Country: Paraguay
- Autonomous Capital District: Gran Asunción
- City: Asunción

Santo Domingo is a neighbourhood (barrio) of Asunción, Paraguay.

== Notable residents ==
- Horacio Cartes, former president of Paraguay
