= Paraguayan Cuarta División =

Primera División C
- Founded: 1997
- Country: Paraguay
- Confederation: CONMEBOL
- Number of clubs: 12
- Level on pyramid: 4
- Promotion to: Tercera División
- Domestic cup: Copa Paraguay
- Current champions: Sportivo Iteño (1st title) (2024)
- Most championships: Atlántida (3 titles)
- Website: APF

The Paraguayan Cuarta División (English: Fourth Division) is the fourth tier football league in Paraguay. It is organized by the Asociación Paraguaya de Fútbol.

The Paraguayan Cuarta División is divided into three leagues:

- The Primera División C (disputed within Asunción and the Central Department.
- The Qualification from the Unión del Fútbol del Interior to the Primera División B Nacional called Primera División C Nacional (disputed by clubs in Paraguay's interior)
- Paraguay's regional leagues (disputed by each department except Asunción and the Central Department)

== Primera División C ==
=== List of champions ===
Seasons from 1997 until 2007 were Segunda de Ascenso, and from 2008 are Primera División C.

Season	Champion	Runner-up
1997	Atlántida	Independiente
1998	Sport Colonial	3 de Febrero
1999	Pilcomayo	3 de Noviembre
2000	Capitán Figari	Sportivo Ameliano
2001	Deportivo Humaitá	3 de Febrero
2002	General Caballero (SF)	Fernando de la Mora
2003	Sportivo Ameliano	Tembetary
2004	3 de Noviembre	29 de Setiembre
2005	1 de Marzo	Pilcomayo
2006	Sportivo Ameliano	Atlántida
2007	3 de Febrero	Atlántida
2008	Cristóbal Colón	Cerro Corá
2009	River Plate	Martín Ledesma
2010	3 de Febrero	General Caballero (ZC)
2011	12 de Octubre (SD)	Capitán Figari
2012	Atlántida	Dr. Benjamín Aceval
2013	Sportivo Limpeño	Oriental
2014	Fulgencio Yegros	General Caballero (CG)
2015	Deportivo Recoleta	Sportivo Ameliano
2016	Pilcomayo	Cristóbal Colón (JAS)
2017	Atlántida	Presidente Hayes
2018	Tembetary	Sportivo Limpeño
2019	12 de Octubre (SD)	Olimpia (Itá)
2020	Canceled due to the COVID-19 pandemic	
2021	General Caballero (ZC)	Silvio Pettirossi
2022	Benjamín Aceval	Deportivo Humaitá
2023	12 de Octubre (SD)	Sport Colombia
2024	Sportivo Iteño	Fulgencio Yegros
2025	1 de Marzo	12 de Octubre (SD)

== Titles by club ==
Club	Titles	Runners-up	Seasons won	Seasons runner-up
Atlántida	3	2	1997, 2012, 2017	2006, 2007
12 de Octubre (SD)	3	1	2011, 2019, 2023	2025
3 de Febrero	2	2	2007, 2010	1998, 2001
Sportivo Ameliano	2	2	2003, 2006	2000, 2015
Pilcomayo	2	1	1999, 2016	2005
1 de Marzo	2	—	2005, 2025	—
3 de Noviembre	1	1	2004	1999
Capitán Figari	1	1	2000	2011
Benjamín Aceval	1	1	2022	2012
Deportivo Humaitá	1	1	2001	2022
Sportivo Limpeño	1	1	2013	2018
Tembetary	1	1	2018	2003
Fulgencio Yegros	1	1	2014	2024
Cristóbal Colón	1	—	2008	—
General Caballero (ZC)	1	—	2021	—
General Caballero (SF)	1	—	2002	—
Recoleta	1	—	2015	—
River Plate	1	—	2009	—
Sport Colonial	1	—	1998	—
Sportivo Iteño	1	—	2024	—

== See also ==
- Football in Paraguay
- Paraguayan football league system
- Primera División Paraguaya
- División Intermedia
- Paraguayan Tercera División
- Paraguayan Primera División B
- Primera División B Nacional
- Campeonato Nacional de Interligas
- Unión del Fútbol del Interior
- Paraguayan women's football championship
