= Estadio Bernabé Pedrozo =

Multi-use stadium in Asunción, Paraguay

Coordinates: 25.3206047°S 57.6363959°W

Estadio Bernabé Pedrozo is a multi-use stadium in Asunción, Paraguay. It is currently used mostly for football matches and is the home stadium of Club Silvio Pettirossi of the Primera División de Paraguay. The stadium holds 4,200 spectators.
