= Ñemby =

- City
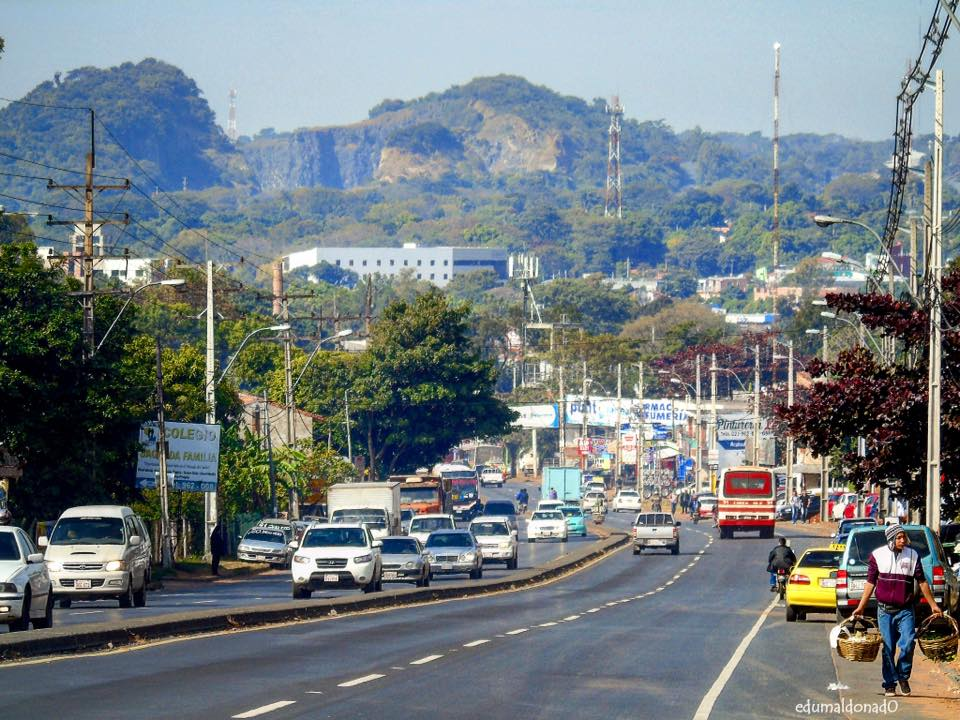

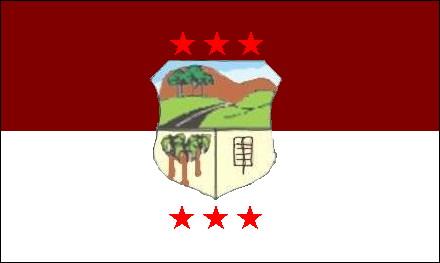
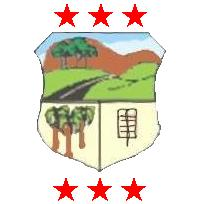
- Flag Seal

- Location within Paraguay
- Coordinates: 25.3935°S 57.5443°W
- Country: Paraguay
- Department: Central
- Mayor: 2016- 2020

Government
- Elevation: 64 m (210 ft)

Population (2012)
  - Total: 126,817
  - Density: 3,170/km^{2} (8,200/sq mi)
- Time zone: GMT -4
  - Summer (DST): -4 UTC
- Climate: Cfa

Ñemby (Guarani pronunciation: [ɲeˈᵐbɨ]) is a city in the Central Department of Paraguay. It is part of the Gran Asunción metropolitan area.

== History ==
Among the historical sites of this city stands the Church of San Lorenzo which was founded by Spanish settlers in 1718 when Ñemby was a population of 2,187 inhabitants; historical sites also include the Colegio Nacional Pablo Patricio Bogarin and Escuela Carlos Antonio López both located in the center of the city.

Its first mayor (intendente) was Pedro Regalado Bogarín. The first democratically elected mayor was Enrique Hugo Garcia Delvalle, on December 17, 1991.

On November 10, 2013 at 22:10 (UTC-3), Lializ Velázquez was murdered by motorcycle jets in Compañía Cañada.

== District Symbols ==
The district flag has the same dimensions as the national flag. It has two colors: deep ruby and white. The deep ruby represents the layer of Saint Lawrence, patron of the city and the color white represent peace. Both stripes have the same dimensions. The district shield is located in the center of the flag over the colors in a circular shape composed by 6 stars representing the neighborhoods Salinas, Mbocayaty, Pa'i Ñu, Cañadita and Caaguazu; The center of Ñemby also count as one neighborhood. The shield also other symbols: the cerro, the lake, land, coco tree representing the nature at the beginning of the foundation and the iron grill, the symbol of the martir, Saint Lawrence.

The flag is in every public institution at Ñemby.

== Transport ==
The city has an extensive bus network that connects with all its neighboring cities and with Asunción, the capital city. The city also has internal buses for neighborhood communication. In addition the city is divided in two by the Avenida Acceso Sur which links Asunción with Itá.

== Government ==
The city has a mayor, called Intendente by locals, and a city council (Junta Municipal) of 15 members elected every 5 years by its citizens. They also sent two Departmental Councillors (Concejales Departamentales) to the Department Government representing the municipality. The current mayor is Lucas Lanzoni of the Authentic Radical Liberal Party (PLRA).

== Sport ==
- Club Fulgencio Yegros
- Club Cristóbal Colón
- Club 6 de Enero
- Club Teniente Fariña
- Club Sportivo José Meza
- Football School «Nuevas Estrellas de Ñemby»
- Club Sol Primavera
- Club 6 de enero (Las Lomitas)
- Football School 16 de Agosto
- Football School Cooperativa de Ñemby
- Football School san miguel
- Federación Ñembyense de handball

== Sources ==
- World Gazeteer: Paraguay – World-Gazetteer.com
