= Club Cristóbal Colón =

Paraguayan football club

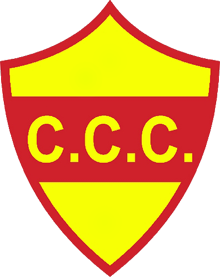
- Nickname: 3 C
- Founded: 1925; 100 years ago
- Ground: Pablo Patricio Bogarín Stadium
- Capacity: 2,500
- Chairman: Nicolás Benítez
- Manager: Vicente Quinto
- League: Primera B Metropolitana
- 2022: 10°
| Home colours | Away colours |

Club Cristóbal Colón, sometimes known as Cristóbal Colón de Ñemby, is a football club based in the city of Ñemby in the Central Department of Paraguay.

The club was founded on October 12, 1925, and currently competes in the Primera División B Metropolitana of the Tercera División, the country's third-tier league.

== Honours ==
=== APF tournaments ===
- Tercera División:
  - Champion (1): 2014
- Cuarta División:
  - Champion (1): 2008

=== UFI tournaments ===
- Cuarta Región Deportiva:
  - Champion (1): 1988
- Liga Regional del Sud de Fútbol:
  - Champion (12): 1952, 1956, 1982, 1983, 1984, 1985, 1986, 1987, 1988, 1989, 1991, 2007
