= Sportivo Iteño =

Paraguayan football club

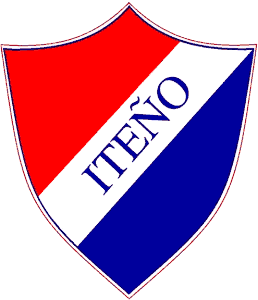
- Full name: Club Sportivo Iteño
- Nickname(s): Los Alfareros
- Founded: June 1, 1924
- Ground: Estadio Salvador Morga
- Capacity: 4,500
- Chairman: Gustavo Arrúa
- Manager: Estanislao Struway
- League: Primera B Metropolitana
- 2022: División Intermedia, 16th of 16 (Relegated)
Home colours	Away colours

Sportivo Iteño is a Paraguayan football club based in the city of Itá, in Central Department. The club was founded on June 1, 1924 and currently plays in Primera División B Metropolitana, one of the three third-division leagues in the Paraguayan football league system. Their home games are played at Salvador Morga stadium which has a capacity of about 4,500 people.

== Current squad ==
As of March 2021.

Note: Flags indicate national team as defined under FIFA eligibility rules; some limited exceptions apply. Players may hold more than one non-FIFA nationality.

No.	Pos.	Nation	Player
—		(Paraguay) PAR	Richard Salinas
—		(Paraguay) PAR	Robin Ramirez
—		(Paraguay) PAR	Luis Miño
—		(Paraguay) PAR	German Caffa

== Honours ==
- Paraguayan Third Division
  - Champions (1): 1985
