= Club 3 de Febrero FBC =

Paraguayan football club

3 de Febrero
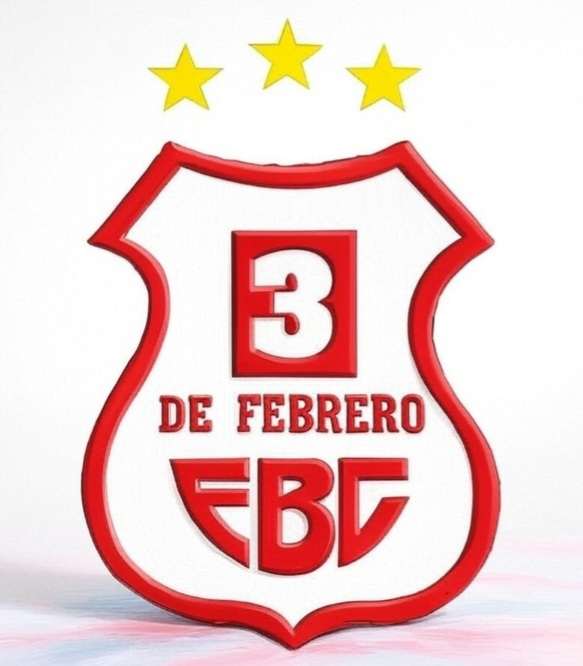
- Logo of Club 3 de Febrero FBC
- Full name: Club 3 de Febrero FBC
- Nickname: El Trece
- Founded: 10 March 1919
- Ground: Estadio 3 de Febrero, Ricardo Brugada, Asunción, Paraguay
- Capacity: 70
- Manager: Domingo Irala
- League: Primera B
- 2023: 12th

Club 3 de Febrero FBC, often referred as 3 de Febrero RB, is a Paraguayan association football club from the neighbourhood of Ricardo Brugada, in Asunción. The club was founded on 10 March 1919 and plays in the Third Division (metropolitan). Their home games are played at the Estadio 3 de Febrero.

The club has been playing in the lower divisions of the Paraguayan league for several decades.

== History ==
In 1972 the club won their first championship (the Third Division) and promoted to Second Division.

The "3 de Febrero" fell three times to Fourth Division, but also rose three times from the same, as runner-up 2001 and as champion (2007, 2010).

== Honours ==
- Paraguayan Third Division
  - Champions (1): 1972
- Paraguayan Fourth Division
  - Champions (2): 2007, 2010
  - Runners-up (1): 2001
