= Resistencia S.C. =

Paraguayan football club

- Full name: Resistencia Sport Club
- Nicknames: Resi; El Triángulo Rojo (The Red Triangle)
- Founded: December 27, 1917
- Ground: Estadio Tomás Beggan Correa
- Capacity: 3,500
- Chairman: Roberto Garcete
- Manager: José Rodríguez
- League: División Intermedia
- 2025: División Intermedia, 6th of 16
Home colours	Away colours	Third colours

Resistencia Sport Club, is a Paraguayan football club based in Barrio Ricardo Brugada in Asunción. The club, founded on December 27, 1917, plays in the División Intermedia of the Paraguayan football league. Resistencia S.C. plays its home matches at the Tomás Beggan Correa Stadium.

== Honours ==
- Paraguayan Second Division
  - Champions (4): 1966, 1975, 1980, 1998
- Paraguayan Third Division
  - Runners-up (1): 2011

== Current squad ==
As of 23 April 2025

Note: Flags indicate national team as defined under FIFA eligibility rules; some limited exceptions apply. Players may hold more than one non-FIFA nationality.

No.	Pos.	Nation	Player
1	GK	PAR	Santiago Godoy
3	DF	PAR	Tobías Castellano
4	DF	ARG	Oscar Brizuela (captain)
5	DF	PAR	Fabricio Romero
6	MF	PAR	Rodrigo Vera
7	MF	PAR	Carlos Romero
10	FW	PAR	Alex Acosta
11	FW	PAR	Martin Amarilla
14	MF	PAR	Jorge Jara
17	FW	PAR	Angel González
19	FW	PAR	Oliver Almirón
21	DF	PAR	Renato Mencía
22	MF	PAR	Marcelo Acosta
24	FW	PAR	Derlis Aguilera
25	MF	PAR	Jorge Giménez
28	FW	PAR	Jorge Colmán
30	GK	PAR	Rodrigo Giménez

No.	Pos.	Nation	Player
37	FW	PAR	Matías Medina
-	GK	PAR	Luis Franco
-	GK	ARG	Franco Lo Tártaro
-	DF	PAR	Gilberto Pérez
-	DF	PAR	Nelson Ruiz
-	DF	COL	Edson Acevedo
-	DF	PAR	Juan Recalde
-	DF	PAR	Adrián Vargas
-	DF	PAR	Bruno Sierich
-	DF	PAR	Eduardo Duarte
-	DF	PAR	Iván Paniagua
-	DF	PAR	Alan Vargas
-	DF	PAR	Adrián Portillo
-	MF	COL	Joan Ramírez
-	MF	PAR	Diego Aguilera
-	MF	PAR	Javier Maidana
-	FW	PAR	Fernando Melgarejo
