= Independiente F.B.C. =

Paraguayan football club

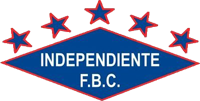
- Full name: Independiente Foot-Ball Club
- Nicknames: El Campo Grandense; El Inde
- Founded: September 20, 1925
- Ground: Estadio Ricardo Gregor
- Capacity: 3,500
- Chairman: Eriberto Gamarra
- Manager: Pablo Caballero
- League: División Intermedia
- 2025: División Intermedia, 14th of 16
Home colours	Away colours

Independiente Foot-Ball Club also referred to as Independiente de Campo Grande or simply Independiente CG is a Paraguayan football club based in the neighbourhood of Salvador del Mundo, an area previously known as Campo Grande, in Asunción, Paraguay. Founded on September 20, 1925, they play in Division Intermedia, the second division in the Paraguayan football league system. Their home stadium is Estadio Ricardo Gregor.

== History ==
Founded on September 20, 1925, by young people from the neighborhood of Campo Grande, its first president was Marciano Romero. The name Independiente arose as a way to get away from the influence of the political parties in football, something very common in those years.

After the Chaco War and when football tournaments resumed in the capital after the war, the club competed in the Federación Paraguaya de Deportes championships.

In the 40s and 50s, when the promotion and relegation system was re-implemented in the divisions of the current Asociación Paraguaya de Fútbol (APF) and when the Tercera División was created, the club affiliated and has competed since then in the APF competitions.

After relegating to the last division, the club achieved the Tercera División title again in 1975, after being promoted and relegated again, it repeated the Third Division title in 1980, thus achieving its third title of the so-called Segunda de Ascenso.

It remained for several years in the Segunda División then called Primera de Ascenso, until 1,997 inches (5,070 cm) which the APF reorganizes its divisions and creates the División Intermedia as the new Segunda División nd expanding the levels of Paraguayan soccer from 3 to 4 divisions, the club was not one of the clubs selected to be part of the División Intermedia, so in 1997 it competed again in the Tercera División then called Primera de Ascenso, since the Segunda de Ascenso became the Cuarta División.

In 2001 they achieved the title of the Tercera División for the fourth time, but it was their first title with the name of Primera de Ascenso. Thus they achieved the promotion to the División Intermedia but couldn't maintain the category and in 2002 they descended again.

From the 2003 season they competed in the Tercera División, until the 2008 season, when they achieved a runner-up position and the right to a playoff for promotion against the runner-up of the Nacional de Interligas. After winning both matches against Deportivo Capiatá, the club achieved promotion to the División Intermedia once again.

In the 2009 Intermedia season, the club finished sixth in the middle of the table, ensuring its permanence in the division.

=== The historic promotion to the First Division ===
In the 2010 season, the club achieved the runner-up position and with it a direct promotion to the Primera División, for the first time in its history.

The club managed to stay in the top fight division for two seasons. After the 2012 season finished the team had an average of 0,977, the worst in the table, so they were relegated to the División Intermedia again.

=== Relegation and a new promotion to Primera ===
The club competed in the Intermedia (Segunda División) in the 2013, 2014 and 2015 seasons with campaigns that kept them away from the relegation places. Finally, in the 2016 season, after an excellent campaign with four games to go before the conclusion of the championship, the club achieved promotion to the Primera División for the second time in its history and for the first time with the title of División Intermedia.

In December 2016, the club began work on its return to the top flight. In the first dates of the 2017 Torneo Apertura the club obtained good results.

=== A new relegation and qualification to Copa Sudamericana ===
In the final stretch of the Primera División, they managed to qualify for the 2019 Copa Sudamericana after placing seventh in the aggregate table of the 2018 season, but at the same time they placed second-from-bottom in the relegation table and were relegated to División Intermedia, thus becoming the first Paraguayan second division team to qualify for an international competition.

Since 2019, they are competing in the División Intermedia with average performances.

== Divisions timeline ==
So far this century, the club has been in 3 of the 4 divisions of the local league system:

== Notable players ==
- (Paraguay) Juan Cardozo (2011)
- (Paraguay) Lorenzo Melgarejo (2011)
- (Paraguay) Diego Gavilán (2012)

=== Non-CONMEBOL players ===
- (Japan) Yohei Iwasaki (2012–2013)

== Honors ==
- Second Division
  - Champions (1): 2016
- Third Division
  - Champions (4): 1962, 1975, 1980, 2001

== Managers ==
- (Paraguay) Alicio Solalinde (February 29, 2012 – May 31, 2012)
