= Club Silvio Pettirossi =

Paraguayan football club

Silvio Pettirossi
- Full name: Club Silvio Pettirossi
- Nickname(s): Los Aviadores (The Aviators)
- Founded: March 11, 1926
- Ground: Estadio Bernabé Pedrozo
- Capacity: 4,000
- Chairman: (Paraguay) Félix Torres
- Manager: (Paraguay) Fidel Amado Pérez
- League: Primera División B
- 2023: 6th
Home colours	Away colours

Club Silvio Pettirossi, is a Paraguayan football club based in the barrio of Republicano, in Asunción. The club was founded March 11, 1926 and plays in the Primera División B, third division of the Paraguayan league. Their home games are played at the Bernabé Pedrozo stadium. The club's name was chosen in honor of Silvio Pettirossi, a famous Paraguayan airplane pilot and aviation pioneer.

== Honours ==
- Paraguayan Second Division: 2

1969, 2007

- Paraguayan Third Division: 7

1952, 1957, 1973, 1974, 1984, 1995, 2004

== Notable players ==
- 2000's
- (Paraguay) Osvaldo Mendoza (2008)
