= Club 29 de Setiembre =

Association football club in Luque

- Full name: Club 29 de Setiembre F.B.C.
- Nickname: Los lechugueros (The lettuce sellers)
- Founded: 30 April 1942; 84 years ago
- Ground: Estadio Salustiano Zaracho
- Capacity: 2,500
- President: Alcides Escobar Trigo
- Head coach: Edgar Aguilera
- League: Primera División B (Third-tier)
- 2023: 17°
Home colours

Club 29 de Setiembre F.B.C. (29 September Club), commonly referred to as Club 29 de Setiembre, is a Paraguayan professional football club based in the Barrio Molino in the city of Luque, which is active in the Primera División B, the country's third-tier. The club was founded on 30 April 1942.

== History ==
=== Luque Regional Club ===
It was founded 30 April 1942. Its name would be an allusion to the end date of the Battle of Boquerón (in 1932), considered one of the most important Paraguayan victories of the Chaco War; although it could also be due to the feast of Saint Michael the Archangel (but this thesis is much less probable).

=== In APF tournaments ===
Since 1982 it was one more team from the Tercera División of the Paraguayan Football Association, then called "Second Ascent".

In the year 1997, with the restructuring of the divisions of the Paraguayan Football Association, the "Second Ascent" went from being the third division to becoming the Primera División C of Paraguayan football, so the club found itself further from the main divisions, without having dropped.

The "29" played for several years in the Primera División C of Paraguayan soccer (according to RSSSF sources, since 2000 or before), until in 2004, he obtained the right to ascend to Primera División B having won one of the two groups of semi-finals. However, the final of the Primera División C against the Club 3 de Noviembre, tied it in normal time and lost on penalties, for which it was runner-up in that category.

In the 2010 season, in his sixth participation in the Primera División B, they reached 3rd place, achieving until that moment their best participation .

In the 2011 season of the Primera División B they were crowned champion and with it the right to ascend to the División Intermedia

In the 2012 season he competed in the División Intermedia (Second Division) championship, but finishing last in the tournament table and in the table of averages fell again to the Primera División B (Third Division in Paraguay).

Since 2013 season he has been in Primera División B (Tercera División).

== Uniform ==
- First Colours : T-shirt with horizontal red and yellow stripes, red shorts and yellow pants.

== Grounds ==
Club 29 de Setiembre (Paraguay)

The club plays at the Estadio Salustiano Zaracho.

Estadio Salustiano Zaracho, Luque, Paraguay
- Capacity: 3,500
- Field size: 100 m × 72 m (328 ft × 236 ft)

== Teams ==
=== Current squad ===
As of 11 October 2020

Note: Flags indicate national team as defined under FIFA eligibility rules; some limited exceptions apply. Players may hold more than one non-FIFA nationality.

No.	Pos.	Nation	Player
–	FW	PAR	Daniel Jara

=== Out on loan ===
Note: Flags indicate national team as defined under FIFA eligibility rules; some limited exceptions apply. Players may hold more than one non-FIFA nationality.

No.	Pos.	Nation	Player

=== Current technical staff ===
Position	Staff
Head coach	(Paraguay) Alcides Escobar Trigo

=== Management ===
Position	Staff
President	(Paraguay) Edgar Aguilera

- Seasons in División Intermedia: 1 (2012)
- Seasons in Tercera División: 13 or more (2005–2011, 2013–2018, 2019).
- Seasons in Cuarta División: 8 (1997–2004)
- Best position in 3rd: 1st (2011).
- Championships: 1

== Achievements ==
=== National tournaments ===
- Tercera División (1): 2011.
- Cuarta División (0):
  - Runner-up (1): 2004.

=== Regional tournaments ===
- Liga Luqueña de Fútbol (3): 1975, 1978, 1980.
