= Club 12 de Octubre de Santo Domingo =

Association football club in Asuncion, Paraguay

Club 12 de Octubre de Santo Domingo is a Paraguayan football club from the Santo Domingo barrio in Asunción. It was founded in 1922.

== History ==
=== Copa Paraguay ===
In 2018, the club was excluded from the year's Copa Paraguay tournament. On 30 May 2019, the club was defeated 3–0 in the Copa Paraguay against 12 de Octubre de Itaguá. On 11 August 2021, the club lost 2–1 against Rubio Ñú in the 2021 tournament.
