= Club 3 de Noviembre =

Football club in Paraguay

- Nicknames: El 3 Trico
- Founded: 1959; 67 years ago
- Ground: Rubén Ramírez Stadium
- Capacity: 1,500
- Chairman: Edgar Serafini
- Manager: Héctor Mario Nuñez
- League: Primera B Metropolitana
- 2023: 7°
Home colours

Club 3 de Noviembre is a Paraguayan football club based in Asunción. It was founded on May 15, 1959, and currently competes in the Primera B Metropolitana league of the Tercera División, the third-tier of Paraguayan football. They play their home matches at Estadio Dr. Ruben Ramirez.

== History ==
Founded on May 15, 1959, initially with the name of Club 15 de Mayo, it was later, in an assembly on May 15, 1961, decided to change the name its current one in honor of the date of birth of the then president of the country. At its early years, the club was affiliated with the Liga Deportiva de Fernando de la Mora where they won a title in 1969.

In 1971, they joined the Asociación Paraguaya de Fútbol (APF), then known as Liga Paraguaya de Fútbol, to participate in what was called the Segunda de Ascenso, the third and last division of Paraguayan football at that time.

In the 2001 season the club finished in the last place of the table in the Cuarta División (Segunda de Ascenso at that time).

In the 2004 season, under the presidency of César Benegas, the club obtained its first and only title so far in an APF competitions by winning the Primera División C championship and thus achieving promotion to Primera División B.

Since 2005 it has remained in the Primera División B of the Tercera División, achieving its best participation in the 2006 and 2008 seasons, reaching 4th place.

== Ground ==
Their home stadium name is Rubén Ramírez, in honor of a former president of the club. It was located, at the time of its inauguration, in the very center of the San Pablo neighborhood, today the area belongs to the Hipódromo neighborhood, in the intersection of Avenida De La Victoria and Paso de Patria. Despite this, the club is always associated and identified with the San Pablo neighborhood.

== Division data ==
- Tercera División seasons: 38+ (1971–1996, 2005–present).
- Cuarta División seasons: 7 (1997–2001, 2003–2004).

== Honours ==
=== National tournaments ===
- Cuarta División (1): 2004.

=== Regionals tournaments ===
- Liga Deportiva de Fernando de la Mora (1): 1969.
