= Club Olimpia (Itá) =

Paraguayan football club

Club Olimpia Itá is a Paraguayan football club. In 2015, the club gained promotion from the Paraguayan Primera División B to the División Intermedia for the 2016 season.

== Notable players ==
To appear in this section a player must have either:

- Played at least 125 games for the club.
- Set a club record or won an individual award while at the club.
- Been part of a national team at any time.
- Played in the first division of any other football association (outside of Paraguay).
- Played in a continental and/or intercontinental competition.

Non-CONMEBOL players

- (France) Karim Safsaf (2016)
