= Club Fernando de la Mora =

Paraguayan football club

Fernando de la Mora
- Full name: Club Fernando de la Mora
- Nicknames: El Matador; El Rojo de Palomar
- Founded: December 25, 1925
- Ground: Estadio Emiliano Ghezzi
- Capacity: 8,000
- Chairman: Humberto Campuzano
- Manager: Miguel Cristaldo
- League: División Intermedia
- 2025: División Intermedia, 15th of 16
Home colours	Away colours

Club Fernando de la Mora is an association football club from the city of Asunción, Paraguay. The team got promoted to Primera División in 2005 by being the runner-up of División Intermedia but got immediately relegated back to the second division by finishing last in the point average in the 2006 season.

== Honours ==
- Second Division: 1

1930

- Third Division: 4

1949, 1950, 1958, 2003

== 2015 squad ==
As of January 18, 2015

Note: Flags indicate national team as defined under FIFA eligibility rules; some limited exceptions apply. Players may hold more than one non-FIFA nationality.

No.	Pos.	Nation	Player
—	GK	PAR	César Quintana
—	DF	PAR	Milcar Gamarra
—	DF	PAR	Arnaldo Rodriguez
—	DF	PAR	Grégor Aguayo
—	DF	PAR	Julio López
—	DF	PAR	Carlos Silva
—	MF	PAR	Sandino Sosa

No.	Pos.	Nation	Player
—	MF	PAR	Juan Abente
—	MF	PAR	Jorge Brítez
—	MF	PAR	Wilfrido Báez
—	FW	PAR	Rodrigo Cantero
—	FW	PAR	Jeremias Velasco
—	FW	PAR	Benjamín Cáceres
—	FW	PAR	Jorge Ayala

== Notable players ==
To appear in this section a player must have either:

- Played at least 125 games for the club.
- Set a club record or won an individual award while at the club.
- Been part of a national team at any time.
- Played in the first division of any other football association (outside of Paraguay).
- Played in a continental and/or intercontinental competition.

Non-CONMEBOL players

- (United States) Bryan Lopez (2010)
