= Club Dr. Benjamín Aceval =

Football club in Paraguay

Club Doctor Benjamín Aceval
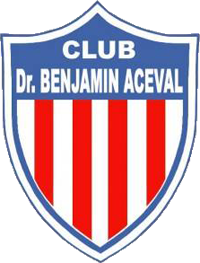
- Nicknames: Acevalenses; Decano Chaqueño; Blanquirojos
- Founded: 1918; 108 years ago
- Ground: Isidro Roussillón
- Capacity: 5,000
- Chairman: Nancy Roussillón
- Manager: Rubén Roussillón
- League: Cuarta División
- 2022: 1st of 12 (Promoted)
Home colours

Club Doctor Benjamín Aceval is a Paraguayan football club based in Villa Hayes, Presidente Hayes. It was stablished in 6 June 1918. Since 2023 they play in the Primera División B Metropolitana of the Tercera División, after winning the title of the Primera División C of the Cuarta División in 2022. They play at Isidro Roussillón Stadium, which has a capacity of 5.000 seats.

== History ==
Founded in 5 June 1918, it's one of the first clubs of the Chaco region, For this reason it is known as the Decano Chaqueño (Dean of Chaco), originally affiliated to UFI's Liga Villahayense de Fútbol, the club was champion on several occasions of the regional tournament, its last titles were achieved in 2005 and 2006, through this last title it was able to registering in 2007 for the UFI Champions Cup (third division), which granted a place for the División Intermedia of the following season, finally they managed to become champion of this "Pre-Intermedia" tournament.

They competed in the División Intermedia, the second-tier of Paraguayan football leagues system in 2008 and 2009, a season in which, when they finished penultimate in the table, they was relegated, they have to return to his regional league for the 2010 season, but they requested their entry to the last category of the APF, Primera C (fourth-tier division), in which they were accepted.

In the 2012 season, they were runners-up in the Cuarta División and thus achieved promotion to the Primera B Metropolitana (Third-tier división) for the 2013 season.

In the 2017 season, the club won its permanence in the Primera B Metropolitana by winning the playoff against the Sportivo Limpeño, after having finished on equal points in the penultimate table position. Tras los dos partidos; victoria en la ida por 2–1 y derrota en la vuelta 1–2 (global 3–3); finalmente logró la victoria y la permanencia por penales con un resultado final de 3–2.

In the 2018 season of the Primera B, the club once again fought for its permanence, but on the penultimate matchday of the tournament it could not avoid relegation. In the Copa Paraguay they did not do well either since they could not pass the qualifying stage of the cup tournament.

After obtaining the title of the Primera División C in 2022, the club will be playing in the 2023 Tercera División, specifically in the Primera B Metropolitana.

== Honours ==
=== APF tournaments ===
- Cuarta División (2):
  - Champion (1): 2022.
  - Runner-up (1): 2012.

=== UFI tournaments ===
- UFI Champions Cup (1): 2007.
