= Club Atlético Tembetary =

Paraguayan football club

Tembetary
- Full name: Club Atlético Tembetary
- Nicknames: Los Rojiverdes (The Red and Greens); El Tembe; Los Nómadas
- Founded: 3 August 1912; 113 years ago
- Ground: Complejo Tembetary, Villa Elisa, Paraguay
- Capacity: 4,500
- President: Carlos González
- Manager: Luis Fernando Escobar
- League: División Intermedia
- 2025: División de Honor, 12th of 12 (Relegated by average)
Home colours	Away colours

Club Atlético Tembetary Ypané is a football club from Villa Elisa, Paraguay, founded in 1912 in Asunción. The club currently plays in the Primera División.

Despite being a very small team that is actually part of the lower divisions of Paraguayan football, it is very well known for producing good players in its youth divisions. The club was previously named Bermejo Football Club until 1920, when the club's name was changed to Club Atlético Tembetary. Tembetary is the former home of Paraguayan World Cup players Nelson Cuevas and Nelson Haedo Valdez, Argentine Fabián Caballero and Moroccan Mourad Hdiouad.

== Notable players ==
1990's

- (Argentina) Fabian Caballero (1997, 1999)
- (Paraguay) Nelson Cuevas (1997–1998)
- (Paraguay) Nelson Haedo Valdez (1998–2001)

2000's

- (Paraguay) Celso Guerrero (2000)
- (Paraguay) Osvaldo Mendoza (2004)
- (Paraguay) Nery Cardozo (2005–2007)
- (Argentina) Luciano Vazquez (2006)

Non-CONMEBOL players

- (Morocco) Mourad Hdiouad (1998)

== Honours ==
- Paraguayan Second Division: 5
  - 1959, 1976, 1983, 1988, 1995
- Paraguayan Third Division: 3
  - 1955, 1992, 2023
