= 2022 Copa Paraguay =

Tournament details
- Country: Paraguay
- Dates: 10 May – 10 November 2022
- Teams: 74

Final positions
- Champions: Sportivo Ameliano (1st title)
- Runners-up: Nacional
- Third place: Guaraní
- Copa Sudamericana: Sportivo Ameliano

Tournament statistics
- Matches played: 77
- Goals scored: 257 (3.34 per match)

The 2022 Copa Paraguay was the fourth edition of the Copa Paraguay, Paraguay's domestic football cup competition organized by the Paraguayan Football Association (APF). The competition began on 10 May and ended on 10 November 2022, with the winners qualifying for the 2023 Copa Sudamericana as well as the 2022 Supercopa Paraguay against the Primera División champions with better record in the aggregate table.

Sportivo Ameliano won their first Copa Paraguay title, beating Nacional on penalty kicks after a 1–1 draw in regular time in the final. Olimpia were the defending champions, but were defeated by Libertad in the round of 16.

== Format ==
On 22 April 2022, the APF confirmed the expansion of the tournament to 74 teams with the inclusion of three preliminary rounds involving clubs from the Football Union of the Interior (UFI), Primera C, Primera B, División Intermedia and Primera División.

For the first stage, the 17 UFI teams were paired according to their geographical location into seven single-legged ties and a triangular group with the remaining three teams, with the winners of the seven ties and the top two teams of the triangular advancing to the next round. The 17 Primera B clubs were drawn in a similar arrangement to the UFI zone except that the ties were decided by a draw, while the 12 Primera C clubs were drawn into six single-legged ties. Nine Primera B teams, six Primera C ones, and nine UFI ones advanced to the next round, where they were joined by the 16 División Intermedia clubs. The 40 clubs competing in the second stage were drawn into 20 single-legged ties, with the winners advancing to the third stage where they were drawn against the 12 Primera División clubs. The 16 third stage winners advanced to the round of 16. Ties in all subsequent rounds were played on a single-legged basis, with a penalty shootout deciding the winner in case of a draw.

== Teams ==
The 2022 edition had a total of 74 participating teams:

=== Primera División ===
- 12 de Octubre (I)
- Cerro Porteño
- General Caballero (JLM)
- Guaireña
- Guaraní
- Libertad
- Nacional
- Olimpia
- Resistencia
- Sol de América
- Sportivo Ameliano
- Tacuary

=== División Intermedia ===
- 2 de Mayo
- 3 de Febrero (CDE)
- Atlético Colegiales
- Atyrá
- Deportivo Santaní
- Fernando de la Mora
- Guaraní (T)
- Independiente (CG)
- Martín Ledesma
- Pastoreo
- River Plate
- Rubio Ñu
- San Lorenzo
- Sportivo Iteño
- Sportivo Luqueño
- Sportivo Trinidense

=== Primera B ===
- 3 de Febrero (RB)
- 3 de Noviembre
- 24 de Setiembre (VP)
- 29 de Setiembre
- Atlántida
- Cristóbal Colón (JAS)
- Cristóbal Colón (Ñ)
- Deportivo Capiatá
- Deportivo Recoleta
- Fulgencio Yegros
- General Caballero (ZC)
- General Díaz
- Olimpia (Itá)
- Presidente Hayes
- Silvio Pettirossi
- Sportivo Limpeño
- Tembetary

=== Primera C ===
- 1° de Marzo (FDM)
- 12 de Octubre (SD)
- Atlético Juventud
- Benjamín Aceval
- Deportivo Pinozá
- General Caballero (CG)
- Humaitá
- Oriental
- Pilcomayo
- Sport Colombia
- Sport Colonial
- Valois Rivarola

=== UFI ===
The champions from each of the 17 departments of Paraguay qualified for the competition:

- Nacional (Yby Yaú) (Concepción)
- Guaraní Unido (San Pedro)
- Porvenir (Cordillera)
- Capitán Samudio (Guairá)
- Atletico Forestal (Caaguazú)
- Coronel Martínez (Caazapá)
- Deportivo Juventud (Itapúa)
- 15 de Agosto (S) (Misiones)
- Sol de Mayo (Paraguarí)
- Obreros Unidos (Alto Paraná)
- 8 de Setiembre (Central)
- 1° de Marzo FBC (Ñeembucú)
- Deportivo Obrero (Amambay)
- Sport Primavera (Canindeyú)
- 15 de Agosto (BA) (Presidente Hayes)
- 1 de Mayo (Boquerón)
- Deportivo Alto Paraguay (Alto Paraguay)

== First stage ==
The draw for the first stage was held on 22 April 2022 and matches were played from 10 May to 17 June 2022.

=== Primera B ===
==== Triangular (Zone 1) ====
Pos	Team	Pld	W	D	L	GF	GA	GD	Pts	Qualification
1	Olimpia (Itá)	2	1	1	0	5	3	+2	4	Advance to Second stage
2	Fulgencio Yegros	2	0	2	0	3	3	0	2	Advance to Second stage
3	Sportivo Limpeño	2	0	1	1	0	2	−2	1	

Source: APF
Rules for classification: 1) Points, 2) Goal difference, 3) Goals for, 4) Drawing of lots.

24 May 2022	Sportivo Limpeño	0–2	Olimpia (Itá)	Asunción
13:45 UTC−4		Report	V. Miranda 35'; González 41'	Stadium: La Arboleda; Referee: Feliciano Fariña

1 June 2022	Fulgencio Yegros	0–0	Sportivo Limpeño	Luque
15:00 UTC−4		Report		Stadium: General Adrián Jara; Referee: Ángel Fleytas

8 June 2022	Olimpia (Itá)	3–3	Fulgencio Yegros	Itá
15:00 UTC−4	Morel 3'; J. Miranda 19', 60'	Report	Acosta 11'; Godoy 21'; Cuevas 42'	Stadium: Presbítero Manuel Gamarra; Referee: José Armoa

==== Knockout ties (Zones 2–8) ====
10 May 2022	24 de Setiembre (VP)	1–0	General Díaz	Areguá
15:00 UTC−4	Pessolani 64'	Report		Stadium: Próculo Cortázar; Referee: Jhonathan González

11 May 2022	Presidente Hayes	1–1 (5–6 p)	Tembetary	Asunción
15:00 UTC−4	Dos Santos 86' (pen.)	Report	Maciel 90+2'	Stadium: Ricardo Gregor; Referee: Feliciano Fariña
	Penalties
	Dos Santos (penalty scored); Torres (penalty scored); Morel (penalty scored); Estigarribia (penalty scored); Alvarenga (penalty scored); Ferreira (penalty missed)		(penalty scored) López; (penalty scored) Acosta; (penalty scored) Ortiz; (penalty scored) Balbuena; (penalty scored) Maciel; (penalty scored) González

31 May 2022	Silvio Pettirossi	2–2 (2–3 p)	Cristóbal Colón (JAS)	Asunción
16:00 UTC−4	Bernal 41'; Medina 55'	Report	Rivas 64'; Ricardo 89'	Stadium: Ricardo Gregor; Referee: Fabio Villalba
	Penalties
	Medina (penalty missed); Ayala (penalty scored); Cañiza (penalty scored); Esteche (penalty missed); Otazú (penalty missed)		(penalty scored) Ojeda; (penalty scored) J. González; (penalty missed) Rivas; (penalty scored) Alonso

31 May 2022	Deportivo Recoleta	1–1 (7–6 p)	Cristóbal Colón (Ñ)	Asunción
18:15 UTC−4	Marecos 59'	Report	Centurión 74'	Stadium: Ricardo Gregor; Referee: Raúl Quintana
	Penalties
	Florienciañez (penalty scored); Miers (penalty missed); Marecos (penalty scored); E. Duarte (penalty scored); Maciel (penalty scored); Vidal (penalty scored); J. Duarte (penalty scored); Cáceres (penalty scored)		(penalty scored) P. Galeano; (penalty scored) González; (penalty scored) Noguera; (penalty scored) Llano; (penalty missed) Ruiz; (penalty scored) Gamarra; (penalty scored) H. Galeano; (penalty missed) Santa Cruz

1 June 2022	3 de Noviembre	0–3	Deportivo Capiatá	Luque
13:00 UTC−4		Report	López 42'; Cáceres 75'; Verdún 78'	Stadium: General Adrián Jara; Referee: Alejandro Ramírez

2 June 2022	3 de Febrero (RB)	3–3 (1–3 p)	General Caballero (ZC)	Villa Hayes
16:00 UTC−4	Bogado 37'; Zárate 62', 82'	Report	Roldán 6'; Liucci 13'; Duarte 54'	Stadium: Isidro Rousillón; Referee: Ulises Mereles
	Penalties
	Bogado (penalty missed); Cabrera (penalty missed); Re (penalty scored); Zárate (penalty missed)		(penalty scored) Chamorro; (penalty scored) Benítez; (penalty missed) Rojas; (penalty scored) Liucci

7 June 2022	Atlántida	2–2 (2–3 p)	29 de Setiembre	Asunción
13:00 UTC−4	Santacruz 43'; Cuesta 45+1'	Report	Balbuena 34'; Torres 35'	Stadium: Ricardo Gregor; Referee: Ulises Mereles
	Penalties
	Duarte (penalty scored); Díaz (penalty missed); Rodríguez (penalty scored); D. Ortiz (penalty missed); Olmedo (penalty missed)		(penalty scored) Giménez; (penalty scored) Cogorno; (penalty missed) Ávalos; (penalty scored) Silvero

=== Primera C ===
11 May 2022	Atlético Juventud	1–2	Valois Rivarola	Asunción
13:00 UTC−4	Barreto 49'	Report	Cubilla 45+2'; Nagele 48'	Stadium: Ricardo Gregor; Referee: Arcenio Mereles

12 May 2022	General Caballero (CG)	2–0	12 de Octubre (SD)	Villa Hayes
13:00 UTC−4	Contrera 55'; Cardozo 84'	Report		Stadium: Isidro Rousillón; Referee: Arthur Afara

24 May 2022	1° de Marzo (FDM)	3–2	Humaitá	Asunción
16:00 UTC−4	Acuña 41'; Caballero 44'; Villalba 68'	Report	Arboleda 36'; Rolón 90+3'	Stadium: La Arboleda; Referee: Jhonatan González

2 June 2022	Benjamín Aceval	2–1	Deportivo Pinozá	Villa Hayes
18:15 UTC−4	R. López 27'; Brítez 48'	Report	Inchima 32' (pen.)	Stadium: Isidro Rousillón; Referee: Francisco Osorio

7 June 2022	Sport Colonial	1–1 (4–2 p)	Oriental	Asunción
15:15 UTC−4	Rojas 68'	Report	González 18'	Stadium: Ricardo Gregor; Referee: Luis Urunaga
	Penalties
	Ortellado (penalty scored); Cáceres (penalty scored); Vázquez (penalty scored); Rojas (penalty missed); Ramírez (penalty scored)		(penalty missed) Cañete; (penalty missed) Caballero; (penalty scored) G. Sánchez; (penalty scored) M. Sánchez

8 June 2022	Sport Colombia	5–1	Pilcomayo	Itá
13:00 UTC−4	Ibarra 9', 43'; Bareiro 63'; Vázquez 69'; T. González 88'	Report	Carballo 77' (pen.)	Stadium: Presbítero Manuel Gamarra; Referee: Álvaro Giménez

=== UFI ===
==== Knockout ties (Zones 1, 3–8) ====
10 May 2022	Porvenir	0–3	8 de Setiembre	Areguá
13:00 UTC−4		Report	Florienciañez 33'; Román 90', 90+4'	Stadium: Próculo Cortázar; Referee: Édgar Barrios

12 May 2022	15 de Agosto (BA)	3–3 (5–4 p)	1 de Mayo	Villa Hayes
15:00 UTC−4	Esquivel 12' (pen.); Etcheverry 59'; Benítez 80' (pen.)	Report	Navarro 74', 75'; Silva 85' (pen.)	Stadium: Isidro Rousillón; Referee: Osmar Soto
	Penalties
	Coronel (penalty scored); Benítez (penalty scored); Gómez (penalty scored); López (penalty scored); Vázquez (penalty scored)		(penalty scored) Silva; (penalty scored) Cabaña; (penalty scored) Machuca; (penalty scored) Cornelio; (penalty missed) Navarro

25 May 2022	Obreros Unidos	2–1	Atlético Forestal	Villarrica
13:45 UTC−4	Fonseca 21'; Núñez 74'	Report	Garay 20'	Stadium: Parque del Guairá; Referee: Alejandro Ramírez

25 May 2022	Capitán Samudio	0–6	Sol de Mayo	Villarrica
16:00 UTC−4		Report	Cristaldo 18', 42'; Mendoza 58'; Duarte 59'; E. Gaona 88'; A. Cabello 90+1'	Stadium: Parque del Guairá; Referee: Ángel Fleytas

26 May 2022	15 de Agosto (S)	2–1	1° de Marzo FBC	San Lorenzo
16:00 UTC−4	Medina 17' (o.g.); Cano 85' (pen.)	Report	Acosta 20'	Stadium: Gunther Vogel; Referee: Ernesto Caballero

26 May 2022	Guaraní Unido	0–4	Sport Primavera	San Lorenzo
18:15 UTC−4		Report	Fariña 21', 49'; Agüero 31'; L. González 59'	Stadium: Gunther Vogel; Referee: Carlos Figueredo

9 June 2022	Coronel Martínez	0–2	Deportivo Juventud	Cambyretá
14:30 UTC−4		Report	Morales 16'; Aguilera 81'	Stadium: Carlos Memmel; Referee: Óscar Amarilla

==== Triangular (Zone 2) ====
Pos	Team	Pld	W	D	L	GF	GA	GD	Pts	Qualification
1	Nacional (Yby Yaú)	2	2	0	0	7	1	+6	6	Advance to Second stage
2	Deportivo Obrero	2	1	0	1	1	1	0	3	Advance to Second stage
3	Deportivo Alto Paraguay	2	0	0	2	1	7	−6	0	

Source: APF
Rules for classification: 1) Points, 2) Goal difference, 3) Goals for, 4) Drawing of lots.

11 June 2022	Deportivo Obrero	0–1	Nacional (Yby Yaú)	Pedro Juan Caballero
13:00 UTC−4		Report	Zárate 79'	Stadium: Río Parapití; Referee: Ángel Fleytas

14 June 2022	Nacional (Yby Yaú)	6–1	Deportivo Alto Paraguay	Pedro Juan Caballero
10:00 UTC−4	Ozuna 11' (pen.), 36', 50', 67'; Jo. Ojeda 81'; Ja. Ojeda 86'	Report	Aquino 3'	Stadium: Río Parapití; Referee: Arthur Afara

17 June 2022	Deportivo Alto Paraguay	0–1	Deportivo Obrero	Pedro Juan Caballero
13:00 UTC−4		Report	Medina 89'	Stadium: Río Parapití; Referee: Víctor Ruiz Díaz

== Second stage ==
The draw for the second stage was held on 20 June 2022. Matches in this round were played from 28 June to 21 July 2022.

28 June 2022	Sport Primavera	1–1 (4–3 p)	Nacional (Yby Yaú)	San Estanislao
14:30 UTC−4	Agüero 50'	Report	Ozuna 7'	Stadium: Juan José Vázquez; Referee: Ángel Fleytas
	Penalties
	Ayala (penalty scored); Agüero (penalty missed); L. González (penalty scored); Martínez (penalty scored); Franco (penalty scored)		(penalty scored) Mora; (penalty missed) R. González; (penalty scored) Ozuna; (penalty scored) Blanco; (penalty missed) Jo. Ojeda

28 June 2022	Fulgencio Yegros	2–0	Deportivo Santaní	San Estanislao
17:00 UTC−4	Parra 18' (pen.); Godoy 32'	Report		Stadium: Juan José Vázquez; Referee: Carlos Figueredo

29 June 2022	Obreros Unidos	0–1	2 de Mayo	Ciudad del Este
13:30 UTC−4		Report	Ávalos 55'	Stadium: Antonio Aranda; Referee: Alejandro Ramírez

29 June 2022	Sport Colonial	3–2	Pastoreo	Ciudad del Este
16:00 UTC−4	Fleitas 14'; Rojas 37', 71'	Report	Solís 7', 88'	Stadium: Antonio Aranda; Referee: Fabio Villalba

30 June 2022	Deportivo Recoleta	1–2	Cristóbal Colón (JAS)	Capiatá
12:45 UTC−4	Maciel 56'	Report	Ojeda 49'; Torales 65'	Stadium: Enrique Soler; Referee: Jhonatan González

30 June 2022	Deportivo Capiatá	1–0	Martín Ledesma	Capiatá
14:45 UTC−4	Benítez 70'	Report		Stadium: Enrique Soler; Referee: Feliciano Fariña

5 July 2022	Benjamín Aceval	2–0	Atyrá	Villa Hayes
13:30 UTC−4	S. López 51' (pen.); Paiva 90+3'	Report		Stadium: Isidro Roussillón; Referee: Ángel Fleytas

5 July 2022	15 de Agosto (BA)	0–4	Sportivo Trinidense	Villa Hayes
16:00 UTC−4		Report	Rayer 24'; Báez 47'; Quiñónez 50'; Mongelos 61'	Stadium: Isidro Roussillón; Referee: Feliciano Fariña

6 July 2022	8 de Setiembre	1–4	General Caballero (ZC)	Areguá
12:45 UTC−4	Florienciañez 64'	Report	Añazco 1'; Liucci 16', 45+2'; Costa 18'	Stadium: Próculo Cortázar; Referee: Sergio Melgarejo

6 July 2022	24 de Setiembre (VP)	2–2 (4–5 p)	Atlético Colegiales	Areguá
14:45 UTC−4	Mora 7'; Pessolani 71'	Report	Echeverría 65'; Enciso 79'	Stadium: Próculo Cortázar; Referee: Héctor Bernal
	Penalties
	Mora (penalty scored); Pacheco (penalty scored); Borjas (penalty scored); Florienciañez (penalty missed); Roa (penalty scored); Velázquez (penalty missed)		(penalty scored) Fernández; (penalty scored) Coronel; (penalty scored) Enciso; (penalty scored) Portillo; (penalty missed) Fleitas; (penalty scored) Orquiola

7 July 2022	15 de Agosto (S)	0–6	River Plate	Villarrica
13:30 UTC−4		Report	Rojas 9'; Velázquez 31', 49'; González 64', 90+1'; Santander 74'	Stadium: Parque del Guairá; Referee: Jhonatan González

7 July 2022	Sol de Mayo	0–1	Sportivo Iteño	Villarrica
16:00 UTC−4		Report	Acheampong 43'	Stadium: Parque del Guairá; Referee: Carlos Chaparro

12 July 2022	29 de Setiembre	1–3	Deportivo Obrero	San Estanislao
17:00 UTC−4	Riquelme 21'	Report	Alcaraz 39'; Sánchez 85'; Pereira 89'	Stadium: Juan José Vázquez; Referee: Héctor Bernal

13 July 2022	Sport Colombia	3–2	Independiente (CG)	Asunción
14:30 UTC−4	Domínguez 26', 51'; Núñez 61'	Report	Villamayor 5'; Leguizamón 21'	Stadium: La Arboleda; Referee: Ulises Mereles

13 July 2022	General Caballero (CG)	0–0 (3–4 p)	Sportivo Luqueño	Asunción
17:00 UTC−4		Report		Stadium: La Arboleda; Referee: Álvaro Giménez
	Penalties
	Valiente (penalty missed); Rivas (penalty scored); Guillén (penalty scored); Contrera (penalty scored); Cabral (penalty missed)		(penalty scored) Marisi; (penalty scored) Pérez; (penalty scored) Gómez; (penalty missed) Cabrera; (penalty scored) Vera

14 July 2022	1° de Marzo (FDM)	0–5	Fernando de la Mora	San Lorenzo
14:30 UTC−4		Report	Guachiré 7'; Díaz 14', 49'; Chávez 53'; Franco 62'	Stadium: Gunther Vogel; Referee: Carlos Figueredo

14 July 2022	Olimpia (Itá)	1–2	San Lorenzo	San Lorenzo
17:00 UTC−4	González 73'	Report	Guerrero 49', 89'	Stadium: Gunther Vogel; Referee: Alejandro Ramírez

19 July 2022	Deportivo Juventud	1–1 (5–3 p)	3 de Febrero (CDE)	Ciudad del Este
16:00 UTC−4	Mereles 6'	Report	Chávez 33'	Stadium: Antonio Aranda; Referee: Víctor Ruiz Díaz
	Penalties
	Cuenca (penalty scored); Acosta (penalty scored); Mereles (penalty scored); Amarilla (penalty scored); Morales (penalty scored)		(penalty scored) Bogado; (penalty missed) Aranda; (penalty scored) Silva; (penalty scored) Helman

20 July 2022	Valois Rivarola	1–3	Rubio Ñu	Asunción
16:00 UTC−4	González 83'	Report	G. Benítez 22'; Morales 31'; Verdún 41'	Stadium: La Arboleda; Referee: Fabio Villalba

21 July 2022	Tembetary	1–1 (4–3 p)	Guaraní (T)	Obligado
14:00 UTC−4	Gómez 30' (pen.)	Report	Almirón 85'	Stadium: Ofelio Schukovsky; Referee: Sergio Melgarejo
	Penalties
	Acosta (penalty scored); González (penalty missed); Ortiz (penalty scored); Roa (penalty scored); Gómez (penalty scored)		(penalty scored) López; (penalty scored) Casas; (penalty missed) Adamy; (penalty scored) Martínez; (penalty missed) Dietze

== Third stage ==
The draw for the third stage and subsequent rounds was held on 15 July 2022. Matches in this round were played from 26 July to 11 August 2022.

26 July 2022	Sport Primavera	1–6	Benjamín Aceval	San Estanislao
16:00 UTC−4	Agüero 7'	Report	Castro 12', 77'; Tintel 26'; López 35' (pen.); Brítez 81'; Morel 90+1'	Stadium: Juan José Vázquez; Referee: Feliciano Fariña

26 July 2022	2 de Mayo	3–4	Sportivo Iteño	San Estanislao
18:30 UTC−4	Zárate 59', 80'; González 68'	Report	Escobar 15' (pen.); Acheampong 36', 48'; Rojas 73'	Stadium: Juan José Vázquez; Referee: Ulises Mereles

27 July 2022	San Lorenzo	1–2	Libertad	Asunción
18:30 UTC−4	Ortiz 68'	Report	Melgarejo 58'; Cardozo 86'	Stadium: La Huerta; Referee: José Armoa

28 July 2022	General Caballero (ZC)	1–0	Sportivo Luqueño	Luque
18:30 UTC−4	Liucci 54'	Report		Stadium: Feliciano Cáceres; Referee: Sergio Melgarejo

2 August 2022	Deportivo Obrero	0–5	Sportivo Ameliano	Villarrica
16:00 UTC−4		Report	Cáceres 8', 53', 63'; Morinigo 72'; Sarquis 79'	Stadium: Parque del Guairá; Referee: José Armoa

2 August 2022	Sportivo Trinidense	2–3	Guaireña	Villarrica
18:30 UTC−4	Tani 7'; Rayer 57'	Report	Duarte 12'; Godoy 27' (pen.); Ocampos 74'	Stadium: Parque del Guairá; Referee: Marco Franco

3 August 2022	Sport Colombia	1–3	Nacional	Asunción
16:00 UTC−4	A. Núñez 65'	Report	J. Santacruz 41'; Fleitas 47'; Palau 68'	Stadium: Arsenio Erico; Referee: Héctor Bernal

3 August 2022	Rubio Ñu	1–0	Cerro Porteño	Asunción
18:30 UTC−4	Morales 37'	Report		Stadium: Arsenio Erico; Referee: César Rolón

4 August 2022	Fernando de la Mora	1–1 (4–5 p)	Sol de América	Villa Elisa
16:00 UTC−4	Chávez 36'	Report	Rojas 17'	Stadium: Luis Alfonso Giagni; Referee: Blas Romero
	Penalties
	Díaz (penalty scored); Arévalos (penalty scored); Guachiré (penalty scored); Aquino (penalty scored); Quiñónez (penalty missed); Gómez (penalty missed); Ramírez (penalty missed)		(penalty scored) Salcedo; (penalty missed) Zárate; (penalty scored) Rojas; (penalty scored) Ruiz Díaz; (penalty scored) Alborno; (penalty missed) Garay; (penalty scored) Núñez

4 August 2022	Sport Colonial	0–9	Olimpia	Asunción
18:30 UTC−4		Report	Montenegro 7', 37', 53'; Gómez 66'; D. González 72', 88'; Franco 76'; Vera 87', 89'	Stadium: Manuel Ferreira; Referee: Gedidías Zacarías

9 August 2022	Tembetary	2–0	Deportivo Capiatá	Asunción
16:00 UTC−4	Roa 26'; Ortiz 74'	Report		Stadium: Jardines del Kelito; Referee: Sergio Melgarejo

9 August 2022	River Plate	1–4	12 de Octubre (I)	Asunción
18:30 UTC−4	Loncharich 73' (pen.)	Report	Velázquez 12'; Mendieta 58'; A. Vera 71'; E. Vera 89'	Stadium: Jardines del Kelito; Referee: Marco Franco

10 August 2022	Atlético Colegiales	1–2	Resistencia	Luque
14:45 UTC−4	Fernández 77'	Report	Aranda 19'; D. Martínez 29'	Stadium: General Adrián Jara; Referee: César Herebia

10 August 2022	Cristóbal Colón (JAS)	0–1	Guaraní	Asunción
18:30 UTC−4		Report	Án. Benítez 47'	Stadium: Rogelio Livieres; Referee: Luis Urunaga

11 August 2022	Deportivo Juventud	1–1 (4–5 p)	Tacuary	Ciudad del Este
16:00 UTC−4	Sánchez 88'	Report	Guerrero 29'	Stadium: Antonio Aranda; Referee: Jhonatan González
	Penalties
	Cuenca (penalty scored); Mereles (penalty missed); Morales (penalty scored); Cabrera (penalty scored); Álvarez (penalty scored); Domínguez (penalty missed)		(penalty missed) Biancucchi; (penalty scored) Amarilla; (penalty scored) González; (penalty scored) Aguilar; (penalty scored) Guerrero; (penalty scored) Salcedo

11 August 2022	Fulgencio Yegros	0–3	General Caballero (JLM)	Ciudad del Este
18:30 UTC−4		Report	Paredes 41', 50'; J. Vera 58'	Stadium: Antonio Aranda; Referee: Héctor Bernal

== Bracket ==
Round of 16
Olimpia	0
Libertad	4
General Caballero (JLM)	1
Guaraní	3
Sol de América	0
Nacional	3
Sportivo Iteño	2
Tacuary	4
Rubio Ñu	1 (4)
12 de Octubre (I) (p)	1 (5)
Resistencia	0
Tembetary	1
Guaireña	5
General Caballero (ZC)	0
Benjamín Aceval	1 (4)
Sportivo Ameliano (p)	1 (5)

Quarter-finals
Libertad	0 (4)
Guaraní (p)	0 (5)
Nacional	2
Tacuary	0
12 de Octubre (I)	1
Tembetary	2
Guaireña	0
Sportivo Ameliano	2

Semi-finals
Guaraní	2
Nacional	3
Tembetary	1
Sportivo Ameliano	2

Final
Nacional	1 (3)
Sportivo Ameliano (p)	1 (4)
Third place play-off
Guaraní	3
Tembetary	2

== Round of 16 ==
The schedule for the round of 16 was announced by the APF on 25 August 2022. Matches in this round were played from 6 to 8 September 2022.

6 September 2022	Sportivo Iteño	2–4	Tacuary	Asunción
15:00 UTC−4	Adorno 7'; Jara 83'	Report	Aguilar 40', 61'; Rodríguez 77' (pen.); Guerrero 90+1'	Stadium: Jardines del Kelito; Referee: José Armoa

6 September 2022	Resistencia	0–1	Tembetary	Asunción
17:30 UTC−4		Report	Roa 69'	Stadium: Jardines del Kelito; Referee: Derlis López

6 September 2022	Guaireña	5–0	General Caballero (ZC)	Villarrica
20:00 UTC−4	Ocampos 2', 48'; Maciel 37'; Brizueña 56'; Ayala 90+2'	Report		Stadium: Parque del Guairá; Referee: César Rolón

7 September 2022	General Caballero (JLM)	1–3	Guaraní	Itauguá
15:00 UTC−4	Heinze 56' (pen.)	Report	F. Fernández 34'; González 62'; Camacho 90+4'	Stadium: Luis Alberto Salinas; Referee: Samuel Morales

7 September 2022	Sol de América	0–3	Nacional	Itauguá
17:30 UTC−4		Report	Bruera 45', 89' (pen.); D. Santacruz 49'	Stadium: Luis Alberto Salinas; Referee: Carlos Benítez

7 September 2022	Olimpia	0–4	Libertad	Asunción
20:00 UTC−4		Report	Melgarejo 8', 18' (pen.), 28'; Santa Cruz 45+3'	Stadium: Defensores del Chaco; Referee: Giancarlos Juliadoza
Note: Match suspended after 53 minutes of play with Libertad leading 4–0 due to crowd disturbances. It was eventually declared as ended and awarded to Libertad.

8 September 2022	Rubio Ñu	1–1 (4–5 p)	12 de Octubre (I)	Asunción
16:00 UTC−4	Ovelar 3'	Report	Batallini 69'	Stadium: Martín Torres; Referee: Blas Romero
	Penalties
	J. González (penalty scored); Ávalos (penalty scored); Barrios (penalty scored); Villero (penalty missed); Villazanti (penalty scored); Verdún (penalty missed)		(penalty scored) Batallini; (penalty scored) Doldán; (penalty missed) Martínez; (penalty scored) Vera; (penalty scored) A. González; (penalty scored) Manenti

8 September 2022	Benjamín Aceval	1–1 (4–5 p)	Sportivo Ameliano	Asunción
18:30 UTC−4	Castro 79'	Report	Aldama 22'	Stadium: Martín Torres; Referee: Aldo Quiñónez
	Penalties
	López (penalty scored); Castro (penalty scored); Paiva (penalty missed); Brítez (penalty scored); Cañete (penalty scored)		(penalty scored) Arce; (penalty scored) Martínez; (penalty scored) Zeballos; (penalty scored) Sarquis; (penalty scored) Aldama

== Quarter-finals ==
The schedule for the quarter-finals was announced by the APF on 21 September 2022. Matches in this round were played on 27 and 28 September 2022.

27 September 2022	Guaireña	0–2	Sportivo Ameliano	Itauguá
16:30 UTC−4		Report	Arce 23'; Areco 46'	Stadium: Luis Alberto Salinas; Referee: David Ojeda

27 September 2022	12 de Octubre (I)	1–2	Tembetary	Itauguá
19:00 UTC−4	Ortiz 67'	Report	Zalazar 21'; Ayala 64'	Stadium: Luis Alberto Salinas; Referee: Juan López

28 September 2022	Nacional	2–0	Tacuary	Asunción
16:30 UTC−4	Fleitas 37'; Cabrera 59'	Report		Stadium: Arsenio Erico; Referee: Mario Díaz de Vivar

28 September 2022	Libertad	0–0 (4–5 p)	Guaraní	Villa Elisa
19:00 UTC−4		Report		Stadium: Luis Alfonso Giagni; Referee: Juan Gabriel Benítez
	Penalties
	Cardozo (penalty scored); Caballero (penalty scored); Bogarín (penalty scored); Díaz (penalty scored); Bocanegra (penalty missed); Barboza (penalty missed); Mayada (penalty missed)		(penalty missed) Segovia; (penalty scored) Román; (penalty scored) Valdez; (penalty scored) Ortiz; (penalty scored) Camacho; (penalty missed) B. Benítez; (penalty scored) Á. Benítez

== Semi-finals ==
19 October 2022	Tembetary	1–2	Sportivo Ameliano	Asunción
17:00 UTC−3	López 87' (pen.)	Report	Vera 53'; Arce 68'	Stadium: Defensores del Chaco; Referee: Mario Díaz de Vivar

19 October 2022	Guaraní	2–3	Nacional	Asunción
19:30 UTC−3	Valdez 12'; Fariña 77'	Report	Caballero 29'; D. Santacruz 34'; Prieto 90+1'	Stadium: Defensores del Chaco; Referee: Derlis López

== Final ==
On 14 October 2022, the APF confirmed that the final would be played in Encarnación on 4 November 2022, as the opening event of the newly built Estadio Villa Alegre.

4 November 2022
20:00 UTC−3

Nacional	1–1	Sportivo Ameliano
Bruera 56'	Report	Sarquis 35'
Penalties
D. Santacruz (penalty scored); Arrúa (penalty scored); Bruera (penalty scored); Rojas (penalty missed); Franco (penalty missed)	3–4	(penalty missed) Gaitán; (penalty scored) Arce; (penalty scored) Zaracho; (penalty scored) Zeballos; (penalty scored) Sanguina

Estadio Villa Alegre, Encarnación
Referee: Mario Díaz de Vivar

Nacional	Sportivo Ameliano

GK	30	(Paraguay) Santiago Rojas (c)
DF	2	(Paraguay) Juan Franco
DF	5	(Paraguay) Rolando Guerreño	(yellow card) 28'
DF	27	(Paraguay) Miguel Jacquet	(yellow card) 60'
DF	19	(Paraguay) Wilson Ibarrola		(substituted off) 24'
MF	7	(Argentina) Darío Ríos		(substituted off) 74'
MF	24	(Paraguay) Jordan Santacruz
MF	11	(Paraguay) Gustavo Caballero	(yellow card) 16'	(substituted off) 46'
MF	33	(Paraguay) Orlando Gaona Lugo	(yellow card) 20'
FW	10	(Paraguay) Danilo Santacruz
FW	25	(Argentina) Facundo Bruera	(yellow card) 68'
Substitutes:
GK	1	(Paraguay) Rodolfo Rodríguez
FW	9	(Paraguay) David Fleitas	(yellow card) 69'	(substituted on) 46'
DF	14	(Paraguay) Claudio Núñez		(substituted on) 24'
MF	16	(Uruguay) Marcelo Palau	(yellow card) 66'
MF	17	(Paraguay) Mathías Martínez
MF	21	(Paraguay) Carlos Arrúa		(substituted on) 74'
DF	28	(Argentina) Bruno Cabrera
Manager:
(Paraguay) Pedro Sarabia

GK	12	(Uruguay) Federico Cristóforo
DF	2	(Paraguay) Ramón Coronel
DF	5	(Paraguay) Inocencio Velázquez
DF	3	(Paraguay) Hugo Benítez
DF	4	(Paraguay) Abel Paredes	(yellow card) 45+2' (yellow-red card) 45+2'
MF	15	(Paraguay) Fredderick Alfonso		(substituted off) 72'
MF	6	(Paraguay) Edgar Zaracho (c)
MF	19	(Paraguay) Alejandro Samudio		(substituted off) 90+5'
MF	7	(Paraguay) Elías Sarquis		(substituted off) 46'
FW	9	(Paraguay) Alex Arce
FW	11	(Paraguay) Jorge Sanguina
Substitutes:
GK	1	(Paraguay) Junior Balbuena
MF	8	(Paraguay) Diego Barreto
FW	10	(Paraguay) Pablo Zeballos		(substituted on) 90+5'
DF	13	(Paraguay) Ángel Arce		(substituted on) 46'
MF	14	(Argentina) Cristian Gaitán		(substituted on) 72'
MF	16	(Paraguay) Fredy Vera
FW	18	(Paraguay) Nicolás Morínigo
Manager:
(Argentina) Juan Pablo Pumpido

== Third place play-off ==
10 November 2022
20:00 UTC−3

Guaraní	3–2	Tembetary
Fernández 71' (pen.), 89' (pen.); Barbotte 75'	Report	C. Benítez 5'; Zalazar 18'

Estadio Arsenio Erico, Asunción
Referee: Juan López

== See also ==
- 2022 Paraguayan Primera División season
- 2022 Paraguayan División Intermedia
