= 2024 Copa de Primera =

División de Honor season

División de Honor
- Season: 2024
- Dates: 19 January – 29 November 2024
- Champions: Apertura: Libertad (25th title); Clausura: Olimpia (47th title)
- Relegated: Sol de América; Tacuary
- Copa Libertadores: Olimpia; Libertad; Cerro Porteño; Nacional (via Copa Paraguay)
- Copa Sudamericana: Guaraní; 2 de Mayo; Sportivo Luqueño; Sportivo Ameliano
- Matches: 264
- Goals: 612 (2.32 per match)
- Top goalscorer: Apertura: Cecilio Domínguez (11 goals); Clausura: Rodney Redes and Rodrigo Ruiz Díaz (7 goals each)
- Biggest home win: Libertad 5–0 Nacional (21 May)
- Biggest away win: Spvo. Luqueño 2–6 Spvo. Trinidense (5 June); Gral. Caballero 0–4 Spvo. Ameliano (13 September); Tacuary 0–4 Sol de América (26 October)
- Highest scoring: Sol de América 6–3 Tacuary (22 May)

The 2024 Copa de Primera (officially the Copa de Primera Tigo – ueno bank 2024 for sponsorship reasons) was the 90th season of the División de Honor, the top-flight professional football league in Paraguay. The season, which consisted of two tournaments (Apertura and Clausura), began on 19 January and ended on 29 November 2024. The fixtures for the season were announced on 4 December 2023.

Libertad entered the season as defending champions, having won both of the tournaments played in the 2023 season, and won a third league championship in a row in the Torneo Apertura, clinching their 25th league title with a 3–1 win over Olimpia on the last round of the tournament on 5 June. Olimpia eventually won their forty-seventh league championship in the Clausura tournament, clinching the title with two matches in hand after a scoreless draw with 2 de Mayo on 17 November.

== Teams ==
Twelve teams competed in this season: the top ten teams in the relegation table of the 2023 season, and the top two teams in the 2023 Paraguayan División Intermedia: Sol de América and 2 de Mayo. Sol de América returned to the top flight after one season, clinching promotion with a 2–0 win over Fernando de la Mora on 17 September 2023, while 2 de Mayo sealed their return to Primera División after 15 years with a 1–1 draw against 3 de Febrero on 23 September 2023. The promoted teams replaced Guaireña and Resistencia, who ended in the bottom two places of the relegation table and were relegated to the second tier at the end of the previous season.

Pos.	Relegated from 2023 Primera División
11th	Guaireña
12th	Resistencia

Pos.	Promoted from 2023 División Intermedia
1st	Sol de América
2nd	2 de Mayo

=== Stadia and locations ===
Locations of the 2024 Primera División teams
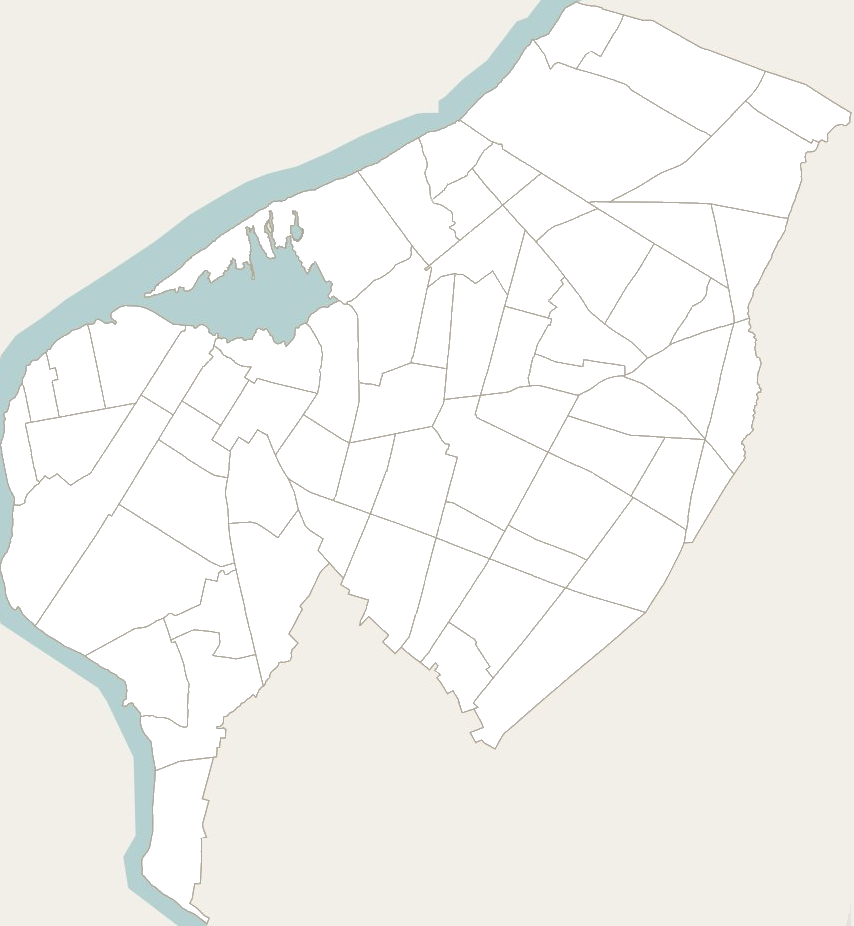
Locations of the 2024 Primera División teams – Asunción

Team	City	Stadium (Note: Teams occasionally play home matches at Estadio Defensores del Chaco in Asunción.)	Capacity
2 de Mayo	Pedro Juan Caballero	Río Parapití	25,000
Cerro Porteño	Asunción	General Pablo Rojas	45,000
General Caballero (JLM)	Juan León Mallorquín	Ka'arendy	10,000
Guaraní	Asunción	Rogelio Livieres	6,000
Libertad	Asunción	Tigo La Huerta	10,000
Nacional	Asunción	Arsenio Erico	4,000
Olimpia	Asunción	Osvaldo Domínguez Dibb	25,000
Sol de América	Villa Elisa	Luis Alfonso Giagni	11,000
Sportivo Ameliano	Villa Elisa	Luis Alfonso Giagni (Note: Used as home stadium for the season since Sportivo Ameliano's stadium Estadio José Tomás Silva in Asunción did not meet APF requirements.)	11,000
Sportivo Luqueño	Luque	Feliciano Cáceres	23,000
Sportivo Trinidense	Asunción	Martín Torres	3,000
Tacuary	Asunción	Jardines del Kelito (Note: Used as home stadium for the season since Tacuary's stadium Estadio Toribio Vargas did not meet APF requirements.)	6,500

=== Personnel and kits ===
Team	Manager	Kit manufacturer	Main shirt sponsors
2 de Mayo	(Paraguay) Felipe Giménez	Kyrios	Zero Grau, Banco Continental, Fleming
Cerro Porteño	(Paraguay) Carlos Jara Saguier	Puma	Tigo, Ueno
General Caballero (JLM)	(Paraguay) Humberto García	Kappa	Sanatorio San Sebastián, Kia
Guaraní	(Paraguay) Francisco Arce	Kyrios	Tigo, Ueno
Libertad	(Paraguay) Sergio Aquino (caretaker)	Puma	Tigo
Nacional	(Argentina) Víctor Bernay	Kappa	Kia, Banco Continental, Coca-Cola, Santa Clara
Olimpia	(Argentina) Martín Palermo	Nike	Tigo, Visión Banco
Sol de América	(Paraguay) Roberto Torres	Diadora	Banco Continental, Kia
Sportivo Ameliano	(Paraguay) Aldo Bobadilla	Netanya Sport	Kia, Banco Continental, Ayres
Sportivo Luqueño	(Argentina) Juan Pablo Pumpido	Kyrios	Comercial Vírgen del Rosario, Hydrate
Sportivo Trinidense	(Paraguay) José Arrúa	Saltarín Rojo	Noroda, Lácteos Trébol, Chorti Beef, Ueno
Tacuary	(Paraguay) Enrique Vera	Temple	Kia, Fleming

=== Managerial changes ===
Team	Outgoing manager	Manner of departure	Date of vacancy	Position in table	Incoming manager	Date of appointment
Torneo Apertura
Sol de América	(Paraguay) César Castro	Sacked	24 November 2023	Pre-season	(Paraguay) Humberto Ovelar	4 December 2023
Guaraní	(Argentina) Pablo de Muner	Resigned	1 December 2023	Pre-season	(Argentina) Lucas Bovaglio	9 December 2023
Sportivo Ameliano	(Paraguay) Humberto García	Resigned	31 December 2023	Pre-season	(Paraguay) Pedro Sarabia	1 January 2024
Olimpia	(Paraguay) Francisco Arce	Sacked	6 February 2024	7th	(Paraguay) Aureliano Torres (Note: Caretaker manager.)	6 February 2024
Sol de América	(Paraguay) Humberto Ovelar	Resigned	10 February 2024	10th	(Paraguay) Humberto García	11 February 2024
Olimpia	(Paraguay) Aureliano Torres	End of caretaker spell	13 February 2024	7th	(Argentina) Martín Palermo	13 February 2024
Tacuary	(Brazil) Vinícius Eutrópio	Sacked	5 March 2024	10th	(Paraguay) Aldo Bobadilla	6 March 2024
Cerro Porteño	(Argentina) Víctor Bernay	Sacked	10 March 2024	7th	(Paraguay) Jorge Achucarro	11 March 2024
Guaraní	(Argentina) Lucas Bovaglio	Sacked	11 March 2024	6th	(Paraguay) Claudio Vargas	11 March 2024
Cerro Porteño	(Paraguay) Jorge Achucarro	End of caretaker spell	16 March 2024	5th	(Spain) Manolo Jiménez	16 March 2024
Guaraní	(Paraguay) Claudio Vargas	End of caretaker spell	21 March 2024	9th	(Paraguay) Francisco Arce	21 March 2024
Nacional	(Argentina) Juan Pablo Pumpido	Resigned	31 March 2024	12th	(Argentina) Víctor Bernay	1 April 2024
General Caballero (JLM)	(Argentina) Fabián Ponce	Sacked	14 April 2024	8th	(Paraguay) Aureliano Torres	14 April 2024
Sol de América	(Paraguay) Humberto García	Sacked	21 April 2024	10th	(Paraguay) Ángel Martínez	21 April 2024
Sol de América	(Paraguay) Ángel Martínez	End of caretaker spell	13 May 2024	9th	(Paraguay) Troadio Duarte	13 May 2024
Tacuary	(Paraguay) Aldo Bobadilla	Resigned	25 May 2024	9th	(Colombia) Álvaro Zuluaga	27 May 2024
Torneo Clausura
Tacuary	(Colombia) Álvaro Zuluaga	End of caretaker spell	7 June 2024	Pre-tournament	(Uruguay) Marcelo Palau	7 June 2024
General Caballero (JLM)	(Paraguay) Aureliano Torres	Sacked	9 June 2024	Pre-tournament	(Paraguay) Humberto García	9 June 2024
Sportivo Ameliano	(Paraguay) Pedro Sarabia	Resigned	10 August 2024	11th	(Paraguay) Aldo Bobadilla	11 August 2024
Sol de América	(Paraguay) Troadio Duarte	Sacked	18 August 2024	11th	(Paraguay) Roberto Torres	18 August 2024
Libertad	(Paraguay) Ariel Galeano	Sacked	19 August 2024	8th	(Argentina) Daniel Garnero	20 August 2024
Sportivo Luqueño	(Paraguay) Julio César Cáceres	Mutual agreement	2 September 2024	9th	(Argentina) Juan Pablo Pumpido	3 September 2024
Tacuary	(Uruguay) Marcelo Palau	Sacked	23 September 2024	11th	(Paraguay) Robert Pereira	23 September 2024
Cerro Porteño	(Spain) Manolo Jiménez	Sacked	30 September 2024	4th	(Paraguay) Carlos Jara Saguier	30 September 2024
Tacuary	(Paraguay) Robert Pereira	Sacked	14 October 2024	11th	(Paraguay) Enrique Vera	14 October 2024
Libertad	(Argentina) Daniel Garnero	Mutual agreement	4 November 2024	9th	(Paraguay) Sergio Aquino	4 November 2024

== Torneo Apertura ==
The Torneo Apertura, named "Homenaje a Iván Almeida", was the 129th official championship of the Primera División and the first championship of the 2024 season. It started on 19 January and ended on 6 June.

=== Standings ===
Pos	Team	Pld	W	D	L	GF	GA	GD	Pts	Qualification
1	Libertad (C)	22	14	6	2	42	16	+26	48	Qualification for Copa Libertadores group stage
2	Cerro Porteño	22	13	6	3	40	17	+23	45	
3	Olimpia	22	9	9	4	28	21	+7	36	
4	Sportivo Luqueño	22	10	5	7	25	22	+3	35	
5	Guaraní	22	8	7	7	31	25	+6	31 (Note: Head-to-head points: Guaraní 6, 2 de Mayo 0.)	
6	2 de Mayo	22	9	4	9	28	25	+3	31	
7	Sol de América	22	7	5	10	26	39	−13	26	
8	Tacuary	22	5	8	9	26	38	−12	23 (Note: Head-to-head points: Tacuary 4, Sportivo Ameliano 1.)	
9	Sportivo Ameliano	22	6	5	11	17	32	−15	23	
10	Nacional	22	6	4	12	24	35	−11	22	
11	Sportivo Trinidense	22	6	3	13	30	34	−4	21	
12	General Caballero (JLM)	22	3	10	9	22	35	−13	19	

Source: APF, Soccerway
Rules for classification: 1) Points, 2) Head-to-head points, 3) Head-to-head goal difference, 4) Overall goal difference, 5) Goals for, 6) Playoff game (if needed to decide championship between two teams) or Drawing of lots (if three teams or more are tied).
(C) Champions

=== Results ===
Home \ Away	2DM	CCP	GCM	GUA	LIB	NAC	OLI	SOL	SPA	SLU	TRI	TAC
2 de Mayo	—	0–2	1–1	0–1	2–0	2–0	1–1	3–0	2–1	0–0	2–1	3–1
Cerro Porteño	0–3 (Note: Match suspended after 55 minutes of play and awarded 3–0 to 2 de Mayo due to crowd disturbances by Cerro Porteño fans. The score at the time of suspension was 0–0.)	—	4–0	2–0	1–1	1–0	1–1	0–0	3–0	0–2	3–1	0–1
General Caballero (JLM)	1–0	2–2	—	0–0	0–2	1–2	1–3	2–3	1–1	1–2	3–2	2–1
Guaraní	3–2	1–1	0–0	—	1–1	3–1	1–3	1–0	0–0	0–1	1–2	3–0
Libertad	3–0	1–3	2–0	2–1	—	5–0	0–0	4–1	4–1	2–1	2–0	1–1
Nacional	3–1	0–2	2–2	1–4	1–1	—	0–1	3–0	1–1	0–1	2–1	0–1
Olimpia	2–1	1–1	1–1	2–1	1–3	2–2	—	1–1	0–1	1–0	1–2	2–1
Sol de América	1–0	0–3	2–1	2–2	1–2	1–0	0–0	—	2–1	0–3	2–3	6–3
Sportivo Ameliano	0–2	1–4	2–0	0–3	0–1	1–0	2–1	2–1	—	1–3	0–2	0–1
Sportivo Luqueño	2–0	0–1	1–1	1–0	0–3	2–0	0–2	1–1	0–0	—	2–6	1–2
Sportivo Trinidense	1–2	1–3	1–1	0–1	1–2	0–1	1–1	4–0	0–1	0–1	—	1–3
Tacuary	1–1	1–3	1–1	4–4	0–0	2–5	0–1	0–2	1–1	1–1	0–0	—

Source: APF, Soccerway
Legend: Blue = home team win; Yellow = draw; Red = away team win.

=== Top scorers ===
Rank	Player	Club	Goals
1	(Paraguay) Cecilio Domínguez	Cerro Porteño	11
2	(Paraguay) Jorge Sanguina	General Caballero (JLM)	8
3	(Paraguay) Brahian Ayala	2 de Mayo	7
3	(Paraguay) Alan Pereira	Sportivo Trinidense	7
5	(Paraguay) Adrián Alcaraz	Guaraní	6
5	(Paraguay) Óscar Cardozo	Libertad	6
5	(Paraguay) Fernando Fernández	Cerro Porteño	6
8	(Argentina) Facundo Bruera	Olimpia	5
8	(Argentina) Lisandro Cabrera	Sol de América	5
8	(Paraguay) Diego Duarte	Nacional	5
8	(Paraguay) Walter González	Guaraní	5
8	(Paraguay) Juan Iturbe	Cerro Porteño	5
8	(Paraguay) Paul Riveros	Guaraní	5
8	(Paraguay) Ronald Roa	Sol de América	5
8	(Paraguay) Derlis Rodríguez	Tacuary	5

Source: Soccerway

== Torneo Clausura ==
The Torneo Clausura, named "Homenaje a los 120 años del Club Nacional", was the 130th official championship of the Primera División and the second and last championship of the 2024 season. It began on 19 July and ended on 29 November.

=== Standings ===
Pos	Team	Pld	W	D	L	GF	GA	GD	Pts	Qualification
1	Olimpia (C)	22	12	8	2	29	13	+16	44	Qualification for Copa Libertadores group stage
2	Guaraní	22	7	14	1	22	15	+7	35	
3	2 de Mayo	22	9	7	6	25	18	+7	34	
4	Sportivo Ameliano	22	9	6	7	21	16	+5	33 (Note: Head-to-head points: Sportivo Ameliano 4, Nacional 1.)	
5	Nacional	22	8	9	5	22	16	+6	33	
6	Cerro Porteño	22	8	5	9	26	28	−2	29	
7	General Caballero (JLM)	22	6	10	6	18	21	−3	28	
8	Sportivo Luqueño	22	6	8	8	27	32	−5	26	
9	Libertad	22	7	5	10	23	29	−6	26	
10	Sportivo Trinidense	22	6	7	9	25	28	−3	25	
11	Sol de América	22	5	6	11	22	26	−4	21	
12	Tacuary	22	4	5	13	17	35	−18	17	

Source: APF, Soccerway
Rules for classification: 1) Points, 2) Head-to-head points, 3) Head-to-head goal difference, 4) Overall goal difference, 5) Goals for, 6) Playoff game (if needed to decide championship between two teams) or Drawing of lots (if three teams or more are tied).
(C) Champions

=== Results ===
Home \ Away	2DM	CCP	GCM	GUA	LIB	NAC	OLI	SOL	SPA	SLU	TRI	TAC
2 de Mayo	—	1–1	0–2	1–2	2–0	1–0	0–0	1–2	1–1	1–2	1–0	2–1
Cerro Porteño	0–3	—	2–1	1–2	2–3	2–1	1–1	1–0	1–0	4–0	1–1	1–1
General Caballero (JLM)	1–1	2–1	—	0–0	3–1	0–0	0–0	1–1	0–4	0–0	2–1	0–0
Guaraní	0–0	1–0	1–1	—	0–0	0–0	0–0	1–1	1–1	2–2	0–0	2–1
Libertad	2–0	2–1	0–1	0–2	—	1–2	0–1	2–0	1–2	0–0	2–2	1–0
Nacional	0–0	2–2	1–0	0–0	2–1	—	2–0	3–1	0–0	1–0	0–0	1–0
Olimpia	2–1	3–0	0–0	1–1	4–0	1–1	—	1–1	1–0	4–3	2–0	3–1
Sol de América	0–2	0–1	3–0	0–0	0–1	3–2	0–1	—	1–0	1–1	2–2	1–2
Sportivo Ameliano	0–2	0–1	0–1	2–2	0–0	1–0	1–0	1–0	—	3–1	1–0	0–0
Sportivo Luqueño	2–3	1–0	1–1	2–1	1–1	2–2	0–1	2–1	0–2	—	1–0	1–1
Sportivo Trinidense	0–0	3–2	2–1	1–2	2–1	0–2	1–2	1–0	3–0	3–2	—	2–3
Tacuary	0–2	0–1	2–1	1–2	2–4	1–0	0–1	0–4	0–2	0–3	1–1	—

Source: APF, Soccerway
Legend: Blue = home team win; Yellow = draw; Red = away team win.

=== Top scorers ===
Rank	Player	Club	Goals
1	(Paraguay) Rodney Redes	Olimpia	7
1	(Paraguay) Rodrigo Ruiz Díaz	2 de Mayo	7
3	(Argentina) Lisandro Cabrera	Sol de América	6
3	(Brazil) Francisco da Costa	Cerro Porteño	6
3	(Paraguay) Marcelo Ferreira	Sportivo Luqueño	6
6	(Paraguay) Brahian Ayala	2 de Mayo	5
6	(Argentina) Paul Charpentier	Sportivo Trinidense	5
6	(Paraguay) Walter González	Guaraní	5
6	(Paraguay) Rubén Lezcano	Libertad	5

Source: Soccerway

== Aggregate table ==
Pos	Team	Pld	W	D	L	GF	GA	GD	Pts	Qualification
1	Olimpia (C)	44	21	17	6	57	34	+23	80	Qualification for Copa Libertadores group stage
2	Libertad (C)	44	21	11	12	65	45	+20	74 (Note: Head-to-head points: Libertad 7, Cerro Porteño 4.)	Qualification for Copa Libertadores group stage
3	Cerro Porteño	44	21	11	12	66	45	+21	74	Qualification for Copa Libertadores second stage
4	Guaraní	44	15	21	8	53	40	+13	66	Qualification for Copa Sudamericana first stage
5	2 de Mayo	44	18	11	15	53	43	+10	65	Qualification for Copa Sudamericana first stage
6	Sportivo Luqueño	44	16	13	15	52	54	−2	61	Qualification for Copa Sudamericana first stage
7	Sportivo Ameliano	44	15	11	18	38	48	−10	56	Qualification for Copa Sudamericana first stage
8	Nacional	44	14	13	17	46	51	−5	55	Qualification for Copa Libertadores first stage (Note: Nacional qualified for the Copa Libertadores first stage as 2024 Copa Paraguay runners-up, since the cup winners Libertad qualified for the Copa Libertadores group stage on league performance.)
9	Sol de América	44	12	11	21	49	65	−16	47 (Note: Head-to-head points: Sol de América 10, General Caballero (JLM) 1.)	
10	General Caballero (JLM)	44	9	20	15	40	57	−17	47	
11	Sportivo Trinidense	44	12	10	22	55	62	−7	46	
12	Tacuary	44	9	13	22	43	73	−30	40	

Source: APF
Rules for classification: 1) Points, 2) Head-to-head points, 3) Head-to-head goal difference, 4) Overall goal difference, 5) Goals for, 6) Playoff game (if needed to decide championship between two teams) or Drawing of lots (if three teams or more are tied).
(C) Champions

== Relegation ==
Relegation is determined at the end of the season by computing an average of the number of points earned per game over the past three seasons. The two teams with the lowest average were relegated to the División Intermedia for the following season.

Pos	Team	2022 Pts	2023 Pts	2024 Pts	Total Pts	Total Pld	Avg	Relegation
1	Libertad	91	99	74	264	132	2	
2	Cerro Porteño	98	81	74	253	132	1.917	
3	Olimpia	92	62	80	234	132	1.773	
4	2 de Mayo	—	—	65	65	44	1.477	
5	Nacional	71	65	55	191	132	1.447	
6	Guaraní	55	65	66	186	132	1.409	
7	Sportivo Luqueño	—	51	61	112	88	1.273	
8	Sportivo Trinidense	—	65	46	111	88	1.261	
9	Sportivo Ameliano	48	57	56	161	132	1.22	
10	General Caballero (JLM)	51	49	47	147	132	1.114	
11	Sol de América (R)	—	—	47	47	44	1.068	Relegation to División Intermedia
12	Tacuary (R)	53	44	40	137	132	1.038	Relegation to División Intermedia

Source: APF

== Season awards ==
On 9 December 2024, a ceremony was held at the headquarters of the Paraguayan Football Association in Luque to announce the winners of the season awards (Premios de Primera), who were chosen based on voting by the managers of the Primera División teams, local sports journalists, the APF's Referee Commission, the public, as well as the tournament's official broadcaster Tigo Sports and official statistics.

Award	Winner	Club
Best Player	(Uruguay) Gastón Olveira	Olimpia
Revelation Player	(Paraguay) César Olmedo	Olimpia
People's Player	(Uruguay) Gastón Olveira	Olimpia
Best Goal	(Argentina) Agustín Manzur	Guaraní
Best Goalkeeper	(Uruguay) Gastón Olveira	Olimpia
Best Manager	(Argentina) Martín Palermo	Olimpia
Best Referee	Juan Gabriel Benítez	
Best Assistant Referee	Eduardo Cardozo	
Best VAR Referee	Carlos Figueredo	
Season's Top Scorer	(Paraguay) Brahian Ayala (12 goals)	2 de Mayo
Fair Play Team	Cerro Porteño	
Most Minutes played by U-18s	Tacuary	

== See also ==
- 2024 Copa Paraguay
- 2024 Paraguayan División Intermedia
- 2024 Paraguayan Women's Football Championship
