= 2022 Supercopa Paraguay =

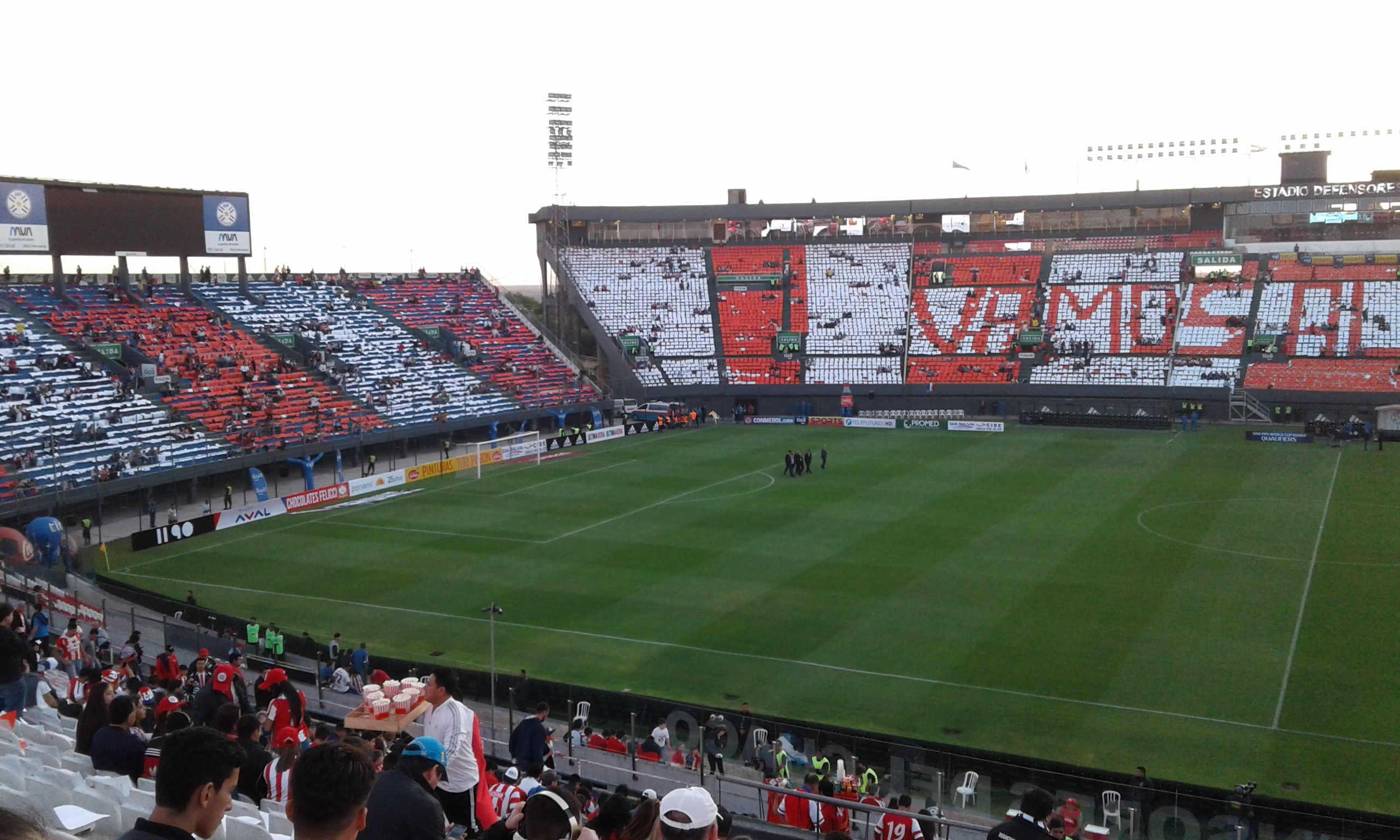
- Estadio Defensores del Chaco hosted the match.
Sportivo Ameliano	Olimpia
1	0
- Date: 25 January 2023
- Venue: Estadio Defensores del Chaco, Asunción
- Referee: Carlos Benítez

The 2022 Supercopa Paraguay was the second edition of the Supercopa Paraguay, Paraguay's football super cup. It was held on 25 January 2023 between the 2022 Primera División best-ranked champions in the aggregate table Olimpia and the 2022 Copa Paraguay champions Sportivo Ameliano at Estadio Defensores del Chaco in Asunción. Unlike the previous edition, this match was the opening event of the 2023 season.

Sportivo Ameliano won the match, defeating Olimpia 1–0 to claim their first Supercopa Paraguay title.

== Teams ==
The Supercopa Paraguay is contested by two teams: the champions of the Copa Paraguay and the Primera División (Apertura or Clausura) champions with the best record in the aggregate table of the season.

Team	Qualification
Sportivo Ameliano	2022 Copa Paraguay champions
Olimpia	2022 Primera División champions with better record in aggregate table

== Details ==
25 January 2023
20:00 UTC−3

Sportivo Ameliano	1–0	Olimpia
E. Vera 38'	Report

Estadio Defensores del Chaco, Asunción
Referee: Carlos Benítez

Sportivo Ameliano	Olimpia

GK	1	(Argentina) Joaquín Papaleo
RB	13	(Paraguay) Walter Cabrera	(substituted off) 68'
CB	3	(Paraguay) Hugo Benítez	(yellow card) 87'
CB	5	(Argentina) Franco Ortellado
LB	4	(Argentina) Marcos Martinich
RM	11	(Paraguay) Fredy Vera	(substituted off) 56'
CM	6	(Paraguay) Édgar Zaracho
CM	8	(Paraguay) Silvio Torales	(substituted off) 56'
LM	7	(Paraguay) Elías Sarquis	(yellow card) 54'	(substituted off) 68'
CF	10	(Paraguay) Giovanni Bogado	(substituted off) 20'
CF	9	(Paraguay) Alex Arce
Substitutes:
GK	12	(Paraguay) Junior Balbuena
DF	2	(Paraguay) Julio González	(substituted on) 68'
MF	21	(Paraguay) Blas Cáceres	(substituted on) 56'
MF	30	(Paraguay) Fredderick Alfonso	(substituted on) 56'
FW	14	(Paraguay) Elvio Vera	(substituted on) 20'	(yellow card) 39'
FW	17	(Paraguay) Alejandro Samudio	(substituted on) 68'
FW	20	(Paraguay) Roland Escobar
Manager:
(Paraguay) Humberto García

GK	1	(Uruguay) Gastón Olveira
RB	29	(Argentina) Víctor Salazar
CB	26	(Paraguay) Junior Barreto	(yellow card) 45+8'
CB	15	(Paraguay) Mateo Gamarra
LB	11	(Paraguay) Iván Torres
RM	3	(Uruguay) Alejandro Silva
CM	17	(Paraguay) Marcos Gómez
CM	6	(Paraguay) Richard Ortiz	(substituted off) 72'
LM	24	(Paraguay) Brian Montenegro
CF	25	(Argentina) Facundo Bruera	(substituted off) 46'
CF	10	(Paraguay) Derlis González
Substitutes:
GK	12	(Paraguay) Juan Espínola
DF	2	(Paraguay) Luis Zárate	(yellow card) 82'
DF	20	(Colombia) Sergio Otálvaro
MF	7	(Paraguay) Hugo Fernández	(substituted on) 46'
MF	14	(Paraguay) Fernando Cardozo
MF	27	(Paraguay) Ramón Martínez
FW	16	(Paraguay) Guillermo Paiva	(substituted on) 72'	(yellow card) 90+1'
Manager:
(Paraguay) Julio César Cáceres

Assistant referees:
Eduardo Cardozo
José Cuevas
Fourth official:
David Ojeda
Video assistant referee:
Mario Díaz de Vivar
Assistant video assistant referee:
Eduardo Britos
Support referee:
Julio Quintana

Match rules

- 90 minutes.
- Penalty shoot-out if scores still level.
- Seven named substitutes.
- Maximum of five substitutions.
