= Federico Cristóforo =

Uruguayan association football player

Personal information
- Full name: Federico Alfredo Cristóforo Pepe
- Date of birth: 19 September 1989 (age 37)
- Place of birth: Montevideo, Uruguay
- Height: 1.83 m (6 ft 0 in)
- Position: Goalkeeper

Team information
- Current team: Ameliano
- Number: 1

Youth career
- Peñarol

Senior career*
Years	Team	Apps	(Gls)
- Huracán (Paso de la Arena)
2013	Progreso	8	(0)
2013–2016	Wanderers	41	(0)
2015	→ Necaxa (Mexico)	0	(0)
2016	Deportivo Maldonado	12	(0)
2017–2019	Danubio	92	(0)
2020	Villa Teresa	7	(0)
2021	Manta	0	(0)
2021	River Plate	14	(0)
2022–	Ameliano	35	(0)
- * Club domestic league appearances and goals

Federico Alfredo Cristóforo Pepe (born 19 September 1989) is a Uruguayan footballer who plays as a goalkeeper for Ameliano.

== Career ==
Cristóforo started his career with Uruguayan second tier side Huracán (Paso de la Arena). Before the 2013 season, Cristóforo signed for Wanderers in the Uruguayan top flight, where he made 92 league appearances and scored 0 goals. On 5 February 2017, he debuted for Wanderers during a 0–0 draw with Danubio. Before the second half of 2014–15, Cristóforo was sent on loan to Mexican second tier club Necaxa (Mexico). In 2016, he signed for Deportivo Maldonado in the Uruguayan second tier.

Before the 2017 season, he signed for Uruguayan top flight team Danubio. Before the 2020 season, Cristóforo signed for Villa Teresa in the Uruguayan second tier. Before the 2021 season, he signed for Manta in the Ecuadorian top flight. Before the 2022 season, he signed for Paraguayan outfit Ameliano, helping them win the 2022 Copa Paraguay, their first major trophy.

== Personal life ==
Cristóforo is the older brother of former Italian Serie A and Spanish La Liga player Sebastián Cristóforo.

== Honours ==
Wanderers

- Torneo Clausura: 2014

Sportivo Ameliano

- Copa Paraguay: 2022
