= Zaracho =

Zaracho is a surname. Notable people with the surname include:

- Édgar Zaracho (born 1989), Paraguayan footballer
- Matías Zaracho (born 1998), Argentine footballer
- Natalia Zaracho (born 1989), Argentine scrap collector, activist and politician
