= 2024 Paraguayan Women's Football Championship =

Campeonato Anual FEM
- Season: 2024
- Dates: 13 April 2024 –
- Champions: Libertad
- Copa Libertadores Femenina: Libertad; Olimpia
- Matches: 132
- Goals: 610 (4.62 per match)
- Top goalscorer: Liza Larrea and Amada Peralta (30 goals each)
- Biggest home win: Olimpia 12-0 Tacuary (12 August 2024); Olimpia 12-0 Luqueño (8 September 2024)
- Biggest away win: Nacional/Humaitá 1-14 Libertad (8 September 2024)

The 2024 Campeonato Anual FEM was the twenty-fourth official Paraguayan Annual W Championship, the highest league of women's association football in Paraguay. It was organized by the Paraguayan Football Association.

== Competition system ==
Unlike previous seasons, starting with this edition the Apertura and Clausura tournaments will no longer be played. This is due to the implementation of the Copa efe, the Copa Paraguay FEM and the Supercopa FEM, all of which are new local tournaments.

With this new format, the championship will take place from April to September of the current year; and both the champion and vice-champion teams will qualify for the 2025 Copa Libertadores Femenina.

== Teams ==
=== Location ===
The majority of the clubs (8) are concentrated in the country's capital, while three are located a short distance away in cities of the Departamento Central. One is located in the department of Amambay and one is located in Alto Paraná. The Centro de Alto Rendimiento de Fútbol Femenino (CARFEM), property of the Paraguayan Football Association, is included due to its frequent use by teams that choose to officiate there as home venues.

- Note: The social and administrative headquarters of the Sol de América club is in Barrio Obrero, Asunción, but its playing field is located in Villa Elisa where it has been home since 1985.

Department/District	Quantity	Teams
Asunción	8	Cerro Porteño / Olimpia / Guaraní / Libertad / Nacional* / Tacuary / Sportivo Ameliano / Sportivo Trinidense
Central Department	3	Sol de América / Sportivo Luqueño / Deportivo Humaitá*
Amambay Department	1	Sportivo 2 de Mayo
Alto Paraná Department	1	General Caballero

*	They play as Nacional/Deportivo Humaitá.

=== Teams information ===
List of the teams that will play the two tournaments of the season. The number of participating teams for this season is 12.

Team	Home town	Stadium	Capacity	Founded	Titles	Kit manufacturer	Sponsor
Cerro Porteño	Asunción	General Pablo Rojas	45 000	1 October, 1912	7	Puma	Tigo
General Caballero	Dr. Juan León Mallorquín	Ka'arendy	4500	21 June, 1962	0	Kappa	Sanatorio San Sebastián
Sol de América	Villa Elisa	Luis Alfonso Giagni	11 000	22 March, 1909	0	Kyrios	Coopeduc
Guaraní	Asunción	Rogelio Silvino Livieres	8380	12 October, 1903	0	Kyrios	Tigo
Libertad	Asunción	Tigo La Huerta	10 100	30 July, 1905	1	Puma	Tigo
Nacional	Asunción	Arsenio Erico	4434	5 June, 1904	2	Kappa	Banco Continental
Deportivo Humaitá	Mariano Roque Alonso	Pioneros de Corumba Cué	7 000	19 February, 1932	0	Kappa	Banco Continental
Olimpia	Asunción	Manuel Ferreira	22 000	25 July, 1902	1	Nike	Tigo
Sportivo 2 de Mayo	Pedro Juan Caballero	Río Parapití	25 000	6 December, 1935	0	Kyrios	Pulp
Sportivo Ameliano	Asunción	Estadio Martín Torres	800	6 January, 1936	0	Garcis	Ayres
Sportivo Luqueño	Luque	Feliciano Cáceres	26 974	1 May, 1921	0	Kyrios	Banco Río
Sportivo Trinidense	Asunción	Martín Torres	3 000	11 August, 1935	0	Saltarín Rojo	Noroda
Tacuary	Asunción	Luis Alfonso Giagni	3000	10 December, 1923	0	Saltarín Rojo	Electroban

== League table ==
Pos	Team	Pld	W	D	L	GF	GA	GD	Pts	Qualification or relegation
1	Libertad (C)	22	18	4	0	124	8	+116	58	Qualification for Copa Libertadores Femenina.
2	Olimpia	22	18	4	0	120	5	+115	58	Qualification for Copa Libertadores Femenina.
3	Cerro Porteño	22	15	4	3	73	15	+58	49	
4	Guaraní	22	12	5	5	61	25	+36	41	
5	General Caballero	22	9	5	8	43	44	−1	32	
6	Sportivo Ameliano	22	9	3	10	34	51	−17	30	
7	Sportivo Trinidense	22	8	3	11	29	68	−39	27	
8	Nacional/Humaitá	22	6	5	11	31	48	−17	23	
9	Sol de América	22	5	6	11	30	65	−35	21	
10	Sportivo 2 de Mayo	22	4	6	12	27	70	−43	18	
11	Tacuary	22	3	2	17	23	109	−86	11	
12	Sportivo Luqueño	22	1	1	20	15	102	−87	4	

Source: APF Fútbol Femenino
Rules for classification: 1) Points; 2) Goal difference; 3) Number of goals scored.
(C) Champions

== Top scorers ==
Rank	Name	Club	Goals
1	(Paraguay) Liza Larrea	Libertad	30
1	(Paraguay) Amada Peralta	Olimpia	30
3	(Paraguay) Erika Cartaman	Libertad	23
4	(Paraguay) Karina Castellano	Olimpia	15
5	(Paraguay) Celeste Aguilera	Olimpia	12
6	(Paraguay) Dahiana Rivas	Sportivo Ameliano	11
6	(Paraguay) Antonia Belén Riveros	Cerro Porteño	11
6	(Paraguay) Milagros Luján Ortiz	General Caballero	11
6	(Paraguay) Diana Elizabeth Benítez	Libertad	11
6	(Paraguay) Nabila Perruchino	Olimpia	11

== See also ==
- 2024 Paraguayan (Men's) Primera División season
