= Mazacotte =

Mazacotte is a surname. Notable people with the surname include:

- Alfredo Mazacotte (born 1987), Paraguayan footballer
- Ricardo Mazacotte (born 1985), Argentine-Paraguayan footballer
