= List of Paraguayan football transfers summer 2022 =

The 2022 summer transfer window for Paraguayan football transfers of the Asociación Paraguaya de Fútbol follows in an incomplete list.

== Transactions ==
=== Transfers ===
All players and clubs without a flag are Paraguayan. Multiple transfers made in one day by a club are listed alphabetically, based on their forename.

Date	Name	Moving from	Moving to	Fee
December 2021	Digno Gonzalez	3 de Febrero	Sportivo Luqueño	N/A
31 December 2021	(Argentina) Adrian Martinez	Cerro Porteño	Libertad	End of loan
31 December 2021	(São Tomé and Príncipe) Luis Leal	Sol de America	(Bolivia) Guabirá	N/A
31 December 2021	Pablo Gonzalez Ojeda	Sportivo Trinidense	Olimpia Asunción	End of loan
January 2022	Fidencio Oviedo	Independiente de Hernandarias	Fernando de la Mora	N/A
6 January 2022	(Argentina) Mauro Boselli	Cerro Porteño	(Argentina) Estudiantes LP	Free
9 January 2022	Carlos Servin	Libertad	Tacuary Asunción	Free
9 January 2022	José Aquino	3 de Febrero	Resistencia	Free
9 January 2022	(Uruguay) Antonio Oviedo Cortizo	Rubio Ñú	Sportivo Ameliano	Free
9 January 2022	(Guatemala) José Carlos Pinto	(Guatemala) Comunicaciones	Tacuary Asunción	N/A
9 January 2022	Richard Cabrera	Sportivo Luqueño	Sol de América	Free
9 January 2022	Roque Santa Cruz	Olimpia Asunción	Libertad	Free
9 January 2022	Santiago Salcedo	Sportivo San Lorenzo	General Caballero JLM	Free
9 January 2022	William Mendieta	Olimpia Asunción	Libertad	Free
15 January 2022	Nestor Bareiro	Tacuary Asunción	Deportivo Recoleta	N/A
17 January 2022	Sebastián Ferreira	Libertad	(United States) Houston Dynamo	N/A
18 January 2022	Cristian Riveros	Nacional Asunción	Libertad	N/A
19 January 2022	Edgar Zaracho	Nacional Asunción	Sportivo Ameliano	Free
9 February 2022	(Bolivia) Marcelo Martins	(Brazil) Cruzeiro	Cerro Porteño	N/A
11 February 2022	(Argentina) Federico Carrizo	Cerro Porteño	(Uruguay) Peñarol	Free

== Loans ==
Start date	Name	Moving from	Moving to	End date
9 January 2022	Williams Riveros	(Ecuador) Barcelona	Cerro Porteño	N/A
9 January 2022	Jordan Santa Cruz	Olimpia Asunción	Guaireña	N/A
25 January 2022	Rodrigo Quintero	Guaraní	Rubio Ñú	N/A
