= Néstor Bareiro =

Paraguayan footballer (born 1983)

Personal information
- Full name: Néstor Fabián Bareiro Leguizamón
- Date of birth: 11 December 1983 (age 42)
- Place of birth: Fernando de la Mora, Paraguay
- Height: 1.86 m (6 ft 1 in)
- Position: Forward

Team information
- Current team: Tacuary

Senior career*
Years	Team	Apps	(Gls)
2006	Fernando de la Mora	19	(2)
2007	Nacional Asunción	17	(1)
2007	12 de Octubre	22	(3)
2008	Deportes Concepción	14	(3)
2008–2009	O'Higgins	20	(16)
2009	→ San Luis Potosí (loan)	10	(0)
2009	Municipal Iquique	16	(3)
2010	Sportivo Luqueño	19	(4)
2010–2016	Olimpo	63	(17)
2012	→ Olimpia (loan)	14	(2)
2013	→ Rosario Central (loan)	17	(5)
2013–2015	→ Aragua (loan)	61	(23)
2015–2016	→ Carabobo (loan)	32	(2)
2016	Deportivo Anzoátegui	7	(1)
2018	Fernando de la Mora	13	(1)
2018	Deportivo La Guaira	17	(2)
2019–2021	Tacuary	15	(7)
2022–2026	Deportivo Recoleta	5	(0)
2026–	Tacuary	0	(0)
- * Club domestic league appearances and goals as of 14 March 2026

Néstor Fabián Bareiro Leguizamón (born 11 December 1983 in Fernando de la Mora) is a Paraguayan football forward who plays for Tacuary.

== Career ==
Bareiro began his career playing for Club Fernando de la Mora of the Paraguayan Second Division and made his debut in 2006. He played the first semester of 2007 in Nacional and also played the second semester in 12 de Octubre.

In 2008, he moved to Deportes Concepción of Chile where along with Daud Gazale, scored 13 goals for the team (3 Bareiro and 10 Gazale).

In Torneo Clausura 2008, Bareiro scored 16 goals in 20 matches playing for O'Higgins F.C. and was the top-scorer of the regular phase of the tournament together with Gastón Cellerino of Rangers de Talca with 16 goals.

In 2009, thanks for the good tournament of Bareiro in the last year, he received an offer of the Mexican club San Luis F.C., and he signed. In this club he made an irregular season, playing 12 matches and not scoring goals.

In the second semester of 2009, Bareiro signed with Municipal Iquique, but his team was relegated to the Second Division of Chile.

In 2010, he signed for Sportivo Luqueño. Subsequently, for the second half of the year, he joined Olimpo, recently promoted to the Argentine Primera División.

In 2018, he rejoined Fernando de La Mora.

On 15 January of Paraguay's 2022 summer transfer window, Bareiro completed a transfer to Deportivo Recoleta.
