= Oscar Paulín =

Argentine-Paraguayan footballer and coach

Personal information
- Full name: Oscar Raul Paulín Delarrosa
- Date of birth: 31 July 1952 (age 74)
- Place of birth: Resistencia, Argentina
- Position: Defender

Senior career*
| Years | Team | Apps | (Gls) |
| 1973 | Chaco For Ever | | |
| 1974 | Aldosivi | | |
| 1975–1976 | Guaraní | | |
| 1977–1978 | Olimpia | | |
| 1979 | Sportivo Luqueño | | |
| 1980 | Olimpia | | |
| 1981–1982 | LDU Portoviejo | | |
| 1983 | Oriente Petrolero | | |
| 1984 | Olimpia | | |

Managerial career
- 1986: Olimpia (youth)
- 1986: Presidente Hayes
- 1987–1989: Guaraní (youth)
- 1988–1989: Paraguay U20
- 1990: Cerro Corá
- 1991: Sportivo Luqueño
- 1992: Libertad
- 1993: Sportivo Luqueño
- 1994–1995: Nacional Asunción
- 1996: Cerro Corá
- 1997: Sportivo Luqueño
- 1998: 12 de Octubre
- 1999: Paraguay U17
- 1999: Colo-Colo (youth)
- 2001: Sol de América
- 2001: Colo-Colo (youth)
- 2001: Comunicaciones
- 2002: Sol de América
- 2002: Sportivo Luqueño
- 2002: Juventud Retalteca
- 2003: Tacuary
- 2003–2004: Guaraní
- 2004–2006: Tacuary
- 2006: Olimpia
- 2007: Tacuary
- 2007: Nacional Asunción
- 2007–2008: Sol de América
- 2008–2011: Tacuary
- 2011: Sportivo Luqueño
- 2011: 3 de Febrero
- 2011–2014: 3 de Febrero (youth)
- 2015–2016: Sportivo Ameliano
- 2017: Real Potosí
- 2017: Sport Huancayo (assistant)
- 2018: Comerciantes Unidos (assistant)
- 2021: Fulgencio Yegros
- * Club domestic league appearances and goals

Oscar Raul Paulín Delarrosa (born 31 July 1952) is an Argentine–Paraguayan former association footballer and current coach who directs Sportivo Ameliano in the Paraguayan Tercera Division.

== Playing career ==
Paulín was born in Resistencia, Argentina. He played for Argentine clubs Chaco For Ever and Aldosivi, as well as Paraguay's Club Olimpia Asunción, Guaraní, Sportivo Luqueño, Ecuador's LDU Portoviejo and Bolivia's Oriente Petrolero. Paulin made four appearances for Olimpia Asunción during the 1977 Copa Libertadores.

== Coaching career ==
In 2003, directs Tacuary where he coaches players like Cristian Riveros.

Paulín coached Guaraní from 2003 to 2004. During 2004, he coached the club in the Copa Libertadores and was replaced in February.

In 2011, coaches the first-team 3 de Febrero of Ciudad del Este, and in 2014 manages the Youth Academy of the mentioned club.

In 2015, takes Paraguayan Fourth Division club Sportivo Ameliano to Third Division for 2016 via promotion play-off. With two rounds remaining of the 2016, Paulín had placed Sportivo Ameliano at the top of the third division table and were ahead of the second placed team by one point.
