= Paraguayan football derby =

Superclásico del fútbol paraguayo
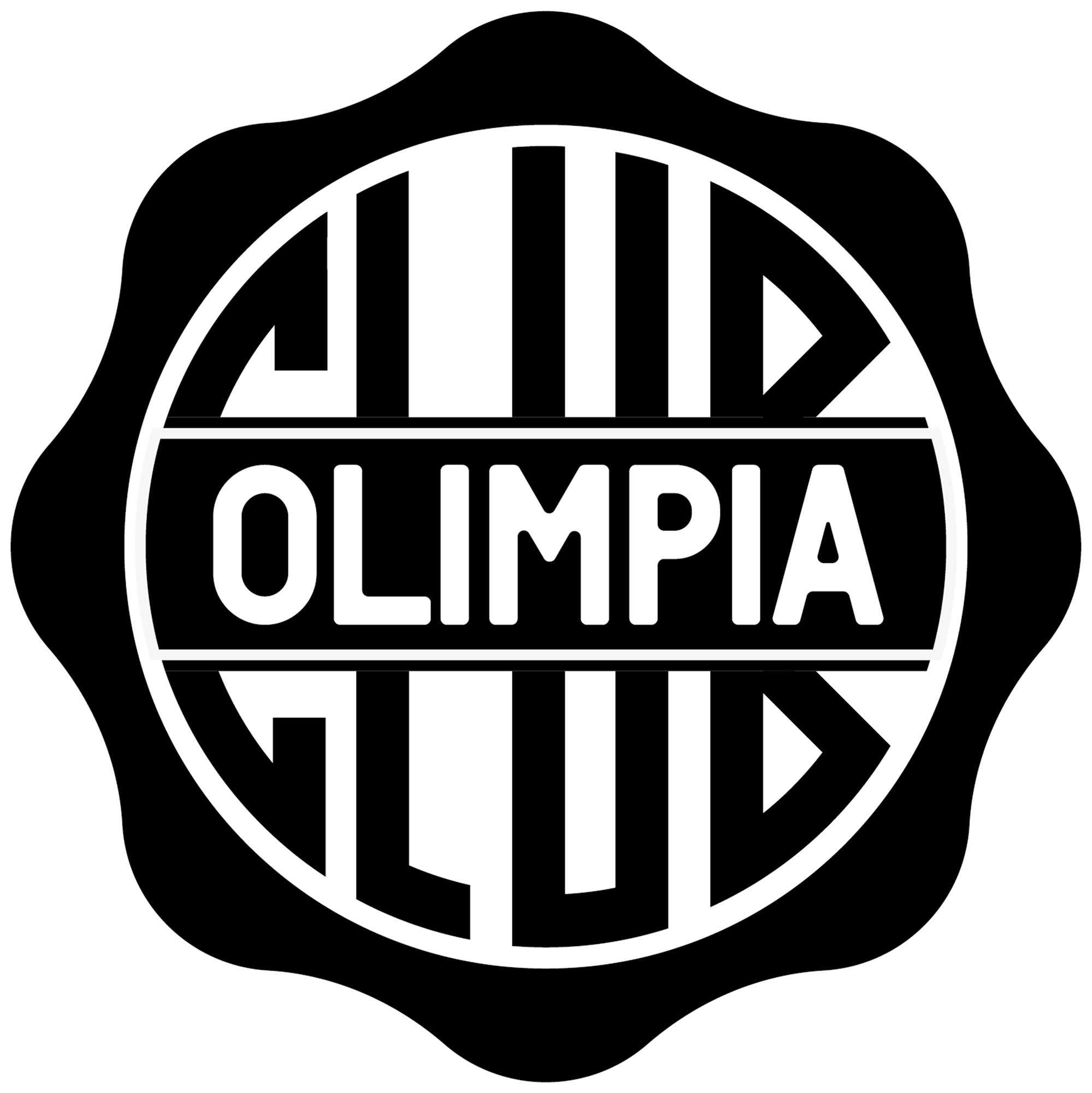
- Olimpia Cerro Porteño
- Other names: Clásico del fútbol paraguayo
- Location: Asunción, Paraguay
- First meeting: 21 September 1913; Primera División; Cerro Porteño 2–2 Olimpia
- Latest meeting: 18 August 2024; Primera División de Paraguay; Cerro Porteño 1-1 Olimpia

Statistics
- Most player appearances: Ever Almeida (57)
- Top scorer: Saturnino Arrúa (11)
- All-time series: Olimpia: 127; Cerro Porteño: 123; Drawn: 116
- Largest victory: 27 February 1916; Friendly; Olimpia 5–0 Cerro Porteño

The Paraguayan football derby, locally known as Superclásico, is the football rivalry between Club Olimpia and Club Cerro Porteño, the two most successful and popular clubs in the country, both from Asunción, Paraguay.
In April 2021, FourFourTwo ranked the Olimpia-Cerro Porteño rivalry as the world's 36th biggest derby.

== Statistics ==
=== Head to head ===
- Updated as of 18 August 2024

Competition	Matches	Cerro Wins	Draws	Olimpia Wins	Cerro Goals	Olimpia Goals
Paraguayan Primera División	324	112	102	110	406	412
Copa Libertadores	34	9	13	12	39	44
Qualifiers for International cups	5	2	0	3	6	8
Torneo República	2	0	1	1	1	2
Supercopa Paraguay	1	0	0	1	1	3
Official matches	366	123	116	127	453	469
Friendly matches	89	31	24	35	170	174
Total	455	154	140	162	623	643

=== Records ===
Other stats from the Paraguayan Derby:

- Largest wins: in an official match goes to Cerro, in an 8–1 win from 1937. Olimpia's biggest win was registered with amateur players in 1916, with a result of 5–0.
- Most consecutive wins by Cerro: five consecutive, in 1986 (2–0, 2–1) and 1987 (2–0, 2–1, 1–0).
- Most consecutive wins by Olimpia: four consecutive in two occasions; in 1925 (3–1, 3–0) and 1926 (4–1, 3–0), and 1980 (2–0) and 1981 (1–0, 1–0, 1–0).
- Longest unbeaten runs: both teams have a record of 10 games without losing to each other. Cerro was unbeaten for 10 games between July 1992 and July 1995; while Olimpia was unbeaten for 11 games between October 2001 and September 2004 (10, in the regular championship).
- All-time top scorers: for Olimpia is Mauro Caballero with 10 goals (9 in the Paraguayan League and 1 in Copa Libertadores) and for Cerro is Saturnino Arrua with 11 goals (7 in the Paraguayan League and 4 in the Copa Libertadores).
- Top Scorers in a single game: Dante Lopez for Olimpia, scoring 4 goals in 2005 and Pedro Osorio for Cerro, scoring 4 goals in 1937.
- Most goals by a player in a single season: Arístides Del Puerto, Rafael Bobadilla and Mauro Caballero have all scored five goals in a single season (in 1967, 1983, 1998 respectively).

==== Players to score for both clubs ====
Goals	Name	Goals in Cerro	Years	Goals in Olimpia	Years
6	Miguel Sanabria	3	1989 y 1990	3	1991, 1994 y 1995
4	Benjamín Laterza	1	1939	3	Entre 1941 y 1949
3	Pablo Zeballos	2	2010	2	2011,2015
3	Julio Díaz	1	1973	2	Entre 1976 y 1980
3	Alfredo Mendoza	1	1983	2	1989 y 1997
2	Crispín Maciel	1	1983	1	1984

== Last encounters ==
Tournament	Home	Score	Away	Venue	Date
2024 Primera División - Clausura	Cerro Porteño	1–1	Olimpia	Estadio General Pablo Rojas	18 August 2024
2024 Primera División - Apertura	Cerro Porteño	1–1	Olimpia	Estadio General Pablo Rojas	12 May 2024
2024 Primera División - Apertura	Olimpia	1–1	Cerro Porteño	Estadio Defensores del Chaco	17 February 2024
2023 Primera División - Clausura	Olimpia	0–0	Cerro Porteño	Estadio Defensores del Chaco	29 October 2023
2023 Primera División - Clausura	Cerro Porteño	1–1	Olimpia	Estadio General Pablo Rojas	13 August 2023
2023 Primera División - Apertura	Cerro Porteño	2–2	Olimpia	Estadio General Pablo Rojas	13 May 2023
2023 Primera División - Apertura	Olimpia	2–2	Cerro Porteño	Estadio Defensores del Chaco	4 March 2023
2022 Primera División - Clausura	Cerro Porteño	1–2	Olimpia	Estadio General Pablo Rojas	16 October 2022
2022 Primera División - Clausura	Olimpia	2–0	Cerro Porteño	Estadio Defensores del Chaco	14 August 2022
2022 Copa Libertadores	Cerro Porteño	0–1	Olimpia	Estadio General Pablo Rojas	25 May 2022
2022 Primera División - Apertura	Olimpia	0–4	Cerro Porteño	Estadio Defensores del Chaco	22 May 2022
2022 Copa Libertadores	Olimpia	0–0	Cerro Porteño	Estadio Defensores del Chaco	5 April 2022
2022 Primera División - Apertura	Cerro Porteño	0–2	Olimpia	Estadio General Pablo Rojas	13 March 2022

== Head-to-head ranking in Primera División seasons ==
This table shows the last seasons positions in the aggregate table of that year for both clubs.

P.	10	11	12	13	14	15	16	17	18	19	20	21	22	23	24	25
1	1	1		1		1	1		1	1	1	1	1		1	1
2			2					2	2		2		2	2		
3			3		3	3		3		3					3	
4		4										4				
5	5				5		5									
6														6		
7				7												7
8																
9																
10																
11																
12																

== Players who have played for both clubs ==
List of players who have played for Cerro Porteño and Olimpia

- (Paraguay) Carlos Bonet
- (Paraguay) Carlos Gamarra
- (Paraguay) Casiano Delvalle
- (Paraguay) Diego Barreto
- (Argentina) Fabian Caballero
- (Paraguay) Fredy Bareiro
- (Paraguay) Gabriel Gonzalez
- (Paraguay) Ivan Torres
- (Paraguay) Nelson Cuevas
- (Paraguay) Pablo Zeballos
- (Paraguay) Rodrigo Rojas
- (Paraguay) Sergio Aquino
- (Argentina) Sergio Goycochea
- (Paraguay) Willian Candia
