= Celso Guerrero =

Paraguayan footballer and manager (born 1972)

Personal information
- Full name: Celso Gerardo Guerrero Pereira
- Date of birth: 17 April 1972 (age 54)
- Place of birth: Asunción, Paraguay
- Position: Goalkeeper

Youth career
- 1986–1992: Libertad

Senior career*
Years	Team	Apps	(Gls)
1989–1993	Libertad		
1993–1995	Estudiantes de La Plata		
1995–2000	Universitario		
2000	Tembetary		
2001	3 de Febrero		

International career
1993	Paraguay	2	(0)

Managerial career
- 2006: Presidente Hayes
- 2012–2013: Sportivo Ameliano
- 2014–: Fulgencio Yegros
- * Club domestic league appearances and goals

Celso Gerardo Guerrero Pereira (born 17 April 1972 in Asunción, Paraguay) is a former association goalkeeper and current manager of Club Fulgencio Yegros of the Paraguayan Primera División C.

== Playing career ==
=== Club ===
Guerrero arrived at Universitario in 1995, recommended to the club by José Luís Chilavert. He debuted for Universitario in the 11th round of the 1995 season on 12 May, in a 3–0 victory against León de Huánuco. In the following fixture, he conceded 6 goals in a derby against Alianza Lima which ended 6–3.

He signed with Tembetary in 2000.

=== National team ===
Guerrero participated at the 1993 Copa América in Ecuador, and also participated in the qualifiers for the 1994 FIFA World Cup.

== Coaching career ==
In 2006, Guerrero coached Presidente Hayes and got the club promoted to the División Intermedia, Paraguay's second division.

From 2012 to 2013, he coached Sportivo Ameliano in Paraguay's 4th division.

In 2014, he is managing Fulgencio Yegros in Paraguay's 4th division.
