= Copa eFe =

- Organising body: Paraguayan Football Association
- Founded: 2024; 2 years ago
- Country: Paraguay
- Confederation: CONMEBOL
- Number of clubs: 12
- Current champions: Libertad (2025)
- Broadcaster: Tigo Sports
- Website: apf.org.py

The Copa eFe is a national tournament for women's football in Paraguay, organized by the Paraguayan Football Association since 2024.

== Competition system ==
The teams are divided into two zones according to their accumulated points in the Campeonato Anual FEM ranking, which is based on the combined points earned in two categories (Senior and U-18) in the annual tournament. The six teams with the highest points are placed in Zone 1, while the remaining teams are placed in Zone 2. Within each zone, the teams compete in a round-robin system, with the team finishing first in Zone 1 being crowned Champions, and the team finishing first in Zone 2 being designated as the Winners.

== League championships ==
| Edition | Season | Champion | Runner-up |
|---|---|---|---|
| 1st | 2024 | Olimpia | Libertad |
| 2nd | 2025 | Libertad | Guaraní |
| 3rd | 2026 | | |

== See also ==
- Paraguayan Women's Football Championship
- Copa Paraguay FEM
- Paraguay women's national football team
