= Humberto García (footballer) =

Paraguayan football manager (born 1974)

Personal information
- Full name: Humberto Antonio García Ramírez
- Date of birth: 13 May 1974 (age 52)
- Place of birth: Luque, Paraguay
- Position: Midfielder

Team information
- Current team: Sportivo Ameliano (manager)

Senior career*
Years	Team	Apps	(Gls)
1994	Sport Colombia		

Managerial career
- 2007–2009: Sport Colombia
- 2010: Sportivo San Lorenzo
- 2010–2011: Sport Colombia
- 2011–2012: General Díaz
- 2012: Independiente FBC
- 2013–2015: General Díaz
- 2015: Deportivo Capiatá
- 2015–2016: General Díaz
- 2016: Sport Colombia
- 2016: Fernando de la Mora
- 2016: General Díaz
- 2017: Fernando de la Mora
- 2018: Deportivo Liberación
- 2019–2022: Sportivo Ameliano
- 2022: Mariscal López
- 2023: Sportivo Ameliano
- 2024: Sol de América
- 2024: Resistencia
- 2024: General Caballero JLM
- 2025–: Sportivo Ameliano
- * Club domestic league appearances and goals

Humberto Antonio García Ramírez (born 13 May 1974) is a Paraguayan football manager and former player who played as a midfielder. He is the current manager of Sportivo Ameliano.

== Career ==
After notably playing as a senior for Sport Colombia, García began his managerial career with the club in 2007. He left at the end of the 2009 season, subsequently taking over Sportivo San Lorenzo, but returned to Sport Colombia shortly after.

In 2011, García was appointed manager of General Díaz, helping in their promotion to Primera División in 2012, as champions. He was sacked on 29 March 2015, and was named at the helm of fellow top-tier side Deportivo Capiatá on 6 April.

Dismissed by Capiatá on 24 August 2015, García returned to General Díaz seven days later, and helped the side to avoid relegation. After a short period back at Sport Colombia, he took over Fernando de la Mora in July 2016, before returning once again to General Díaz on 21 November; the club again narrowly avoided relegation.

Back at Fernando de la Mora for the 2017 season, García was replaced by Julio Villalba in May of that year. On 16 April 2018, he was named manager of Deportivo Liberación in the second division, but was sacked on 3 July.

On 5 March 2019, García was named at the helm of Sportivo Ameliano in the Primera División B. After achieving promotion to the second division as champions, he led the club to the top tier in 2021, after winning the promotion/relegation play-offs.

On 18 September 2022, García was sacked by Ameliano, and was appointed in charge of third division side Mariscal López two days later. On 22 November, he returned to Ameliano after Juan Pablo Pumpido resigned, but left the club himself on 31 December.

On 11 February 2024, García was appointed manager of Sol de América also in the top tier, but was dismissed on 21 April. On 9 June, after a short period at Resistencia, he took over General Caballero JLM.

== Honours ==
=== Manager ===
Sport Colombia

- Paraguayan Tercera División: 2007

General Díaz

- Paraguayan División Intermedia: 2012

Sportivo Ameliano

- Paraguayan Primera División B: 2019
