= Estadio José Tomás Silva =

Football stadium in Paraguay

- La Paila
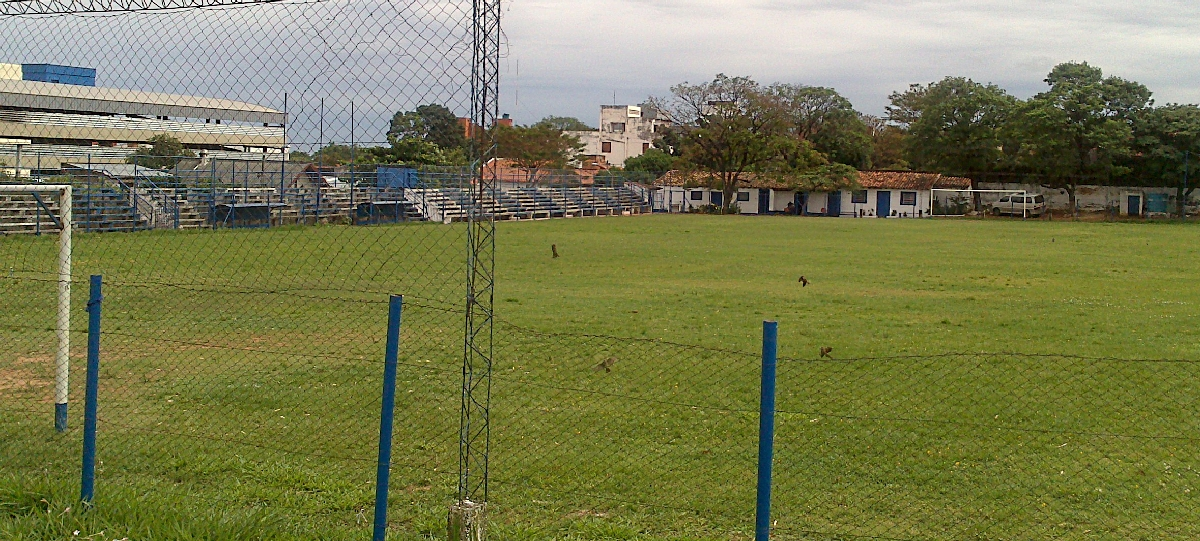
- Interactive map of Estadio José Tomás Silva
- Address: Calle Diego de Silva y Velázquez; Asunción; Paraguay
- Coordinates: 25°16′45″S 57°35′53″W
- Capacity: 800
- Type: Stadium
- Event: Sporting events
- Surface: Grass

Construction
- Opened: 1970

Tenant
- Sportivo Ameliano

The Estadio José Tomás Silva is a football stadium in Paraguay located in the Virgen del Huerto neighborhood of Asunción. The stadium has a capacity of 800 people and is home for Primera División club Sportivo Ameliano. This venue is popularly known as La paila.

In its beginnings, the club had its first sports field on the property currently occupied by the Instituto de Medicina Tropical, on Venezuela Avenue. In later years it had another playing field near España and Venezuela Avenue.

In the 1970s, it moved to the current site where the current stadium was built. One of the main promoters being Mr. José Tomás Silva.

In 2013, a modern gym was inaugurated on the club grounds.

In December 2015, the stadium suffered some damage after a storm.
