= Jesús Paredes =

Paraguayan footballer (born 1997)

Personal information
- Full name: Jesús Abel Paredes Melgarejo
- Date of birth: 27 May 1997 (age 29)
- Place of birth: Presidente Franco, Paraguay
- Height: 1.80 m (5 ft 11 in)
- Position: Defender

Team information
- Current team: Club Olimpia
- Number: 16

Senior career*
Years	Team	Apps	(Gls)
2017–2018	Club Olimpia	9	(0)
2018–2019	Independiente F.B.C.	6	(0)
2019–2020	Fernando de la Mora		
2020–2021	Sampaio Corrêa		
2021	Maringá	7	(0)
2022–2024	Sportivo Ameliano	81	(0)
2025–	Olimpia	7	(0)
- * Club domestic league appearances and goals as of August 13, 2025

Jesús Abel Paredes Melgarejo (born 27 May 1997) is a Paraguayan footballer who plays as a defender for Olimpia.
