= Miguel Martínez (Paraguayan footballer) =

Paraguayan football player (born 1998)

Personal information
- Full name: Miguel Angel Martínez Irala
- Date of birth: 29 September 1998 (age 28)
- Place of birth: Luque, Paraguay
- Height: 1.90 m (6 ft 3 in)
- Position: Goalkeeper

Team information
- Current team: Sportivo Ameliano
- Number: 23

Senior career*
Years	Team	Apps	(Gls)
2017–2019	General Diaz	40	(0)
2020–2024	Cerro Porteño	25	(0)
2025–	Sportivo Ameliano	28	(0)

International career^{‡}
2015	Paraguay U17	1	(0)
- * Club domestic league appearances and goals as of 13 August 2025 ‡ National team caps and goals as of 10 October 2019

Miguel Angel Martínez Irala (born 29 September 1998) is a Paraguay international footballer who plays for Sportivo Ameliano, as a goalkeeper.

== Career ==
Martínez made his debut and played only for General Diaz.

=== International ===
Martínez was called up to the Paraguay squad for the first time in October 2019.
