= Campeonato Anual FEM =

- Founded: 1997
- Country: Paraguay
- Confederation: CONMEBOL
- Domestic cup(s): Copa Paraguay FEM; Supercopa Paraguay FEM
- International cup: Copa Libertadores Femenina
- Current champions: Olimpia (2026)
- Most championships: Universidad Autónoma (9)
- Top scorer: Liza Larrea (147 goals)
- Current: 2026 season

The Campeonato Anual FEM (English: Annual W Championship) is the top-level league competition for women's football in Paraguay. The winner and runner-up qualify for the Copa Libertadores Femenina, the South American Women's Champions League. The competition is organised by the Paraguayan Football Association.

== Format ==
The teams play a double round robin. After that the six best teams advance to the Hexagonal Final. After participation in the late 2000s has declined to around 6 clubs, there were some seminars by the Football Organisation as how to increase participation. In 2011, 12 teams did enter the championship.

== List of champions ==
In 1997 an experimental tournament was held and won by Nacional. Then, from 1999, the competition was held annually, except for 2001. Universidad Autónoma won 9 times out of 13. Since at least 2004 an Apertura and Clausura format was adopted. The winners of those are not considered champions but play a playoff for the championship.

- (In bracket, title count):

Ed.	Season	Champion	Runner-up
1	1997	Nacional (1)	Silvio Pettirossi
–	1998	Not held	
2	1999	Universidad Autónoma (1)	Nacional
3	2000	Nacional (2)	Olimpia
–	2001	Not held	
4	2002	Real Sajonia (1)	San Clemente Maria
5	2003	Universidad Autónoma (2)	Nacional
6	2004	Universidad Autónoma (3)	Cerro Porteño
7	2005	Universidad Autónoma (4)	Libertad
8	2006	Universidad Autónoma (5)	Cerro Porteño
9	2007	Cerro Porteño (1)	Universidad Autónoma
10	2008	Universidad Autónoma (6)	Cerro Porteño
11	2009	Universidad Autónoma (7)	Cerro Porteño
12	2010	Universidad Autónoma (8)	Cerro Porteño
13	2011	Universidad Autónoma (9)	Cerro Porteño
14	2012	Cerro Porteño (2)	Universidad Autónoma
15	2013	Cerro Porteño (3)	—
16	2014	Cerro Porteño (4)	Sportivo Limpeño
17	2015	Sportivo Limpeño (1)	Cerro Porteño
18	2016	Sportivo Limpeño (2)	Cerro Porteño
19	2017	Cerro Porteño (5)	Deportivo Capiatá
20	2018	Cerro Porteño (6)	Libertad/Limpeño
21	2019	Libertad/Limpeño (1)(3)	Sol de América
–	2020	Canceled due to the COVID-19 pandemic.	
22	2021	Cerro Porteño (7)	Sol de América
23	2022	Olimpia (1)	Libertad/Limpeño
24	2023	Olimpia (2)	Guaraní
25	2024	Libertad (2)	Olimpia
26	2025	Libertad (3)	Olimpia
27	2026	Olimpia (3)	Libertad

== Titles by club ==
Rank	Club	Titles	Runner-up	Winning years	Runners-up years
1	Universidad Autónoma	9	2	1999, 2003, 2004, 2005, 2006, 2008, 2009, 2010, 2011	2007, 2012
2	Cerro Porteño	7	8	2007, 2012, 2013, 2014, 2017, 2018, 2021	2004, 2006, 2008, 2009, 2010, 2011, 2015, 2016
3	Libertad	3	3	2019, 2024, 2025	2018, 2022, 2026
3	Olimpia	3	3	2022, 2023, 2026	2000, 2024, 2025
3	Sportivo Limpeño	3	1	2015, 2016, 2019	2014
6	Nacional	2	2	1997, 2000	1999, 2003
7	Real Sajonia	1	—	2002	—

== Half-year / Short tournaments ==
=== Apertura and Clausura seasons ===
Season		Champion	Runner-up
2004	Apertura	Universidad Autónoma	
2004	Clausura	Cerro Porteño	Universidad Autónoma
2005	Apertura	Libertad	Universidad Autónoma
2005	Clausura	Universidad Autónoma	Cerro Porteño
2006	Apertura	Universidad Autónoma	Nacional
2006	Clausura	Cerro Porteño	
2007	Apertura	Cerro Porteño	Universidad Autónoma
2007	Clausura	Cerro Porteño	
2008	Apertura	Universidad Autónoma	Cerro Porteño
2008	Clausura	Universidad Autónoma	Cerro Porteño
2009	Apertura	Cerro Porteño	Universidad Autónoma
2009	Clausura	Universidad Autónoma	Cerro Porteño
2011	Apertura	Universidad Autónoma	Cerro Porteño
2011	Clausura	Cerro Porteño	Universidad Autónoma
2012	Apertura	Universidad Autónoma	Cerro Porteño
2012	Clausura	Cerro Porteño	Arkadia Sport
2013	Apertura	Cerro Porteño	Sportivo Limpeño
2013	Clausura	Cerro Porteño	
2014	Apertura	Sportivo Limpeño	Cerro Porteño
2014	Clausura	Cerro Porteño	Sportivo Limpeño
2015	Apertura	Sportivo Limpeño	
2015	Clausura	Cerro Porteño	Sportivo Limpeño
2016	Apertura	Cerro Porteño	Sportivo Limpeño
2016	Clausura	Sportivo Limpeño	Olimpia
2017	Apertura	Cerro Porteño	Sportivo Limpeño
2017	Clausura	Deportivo Capiatá	Cerro Porteño
2019	Apertura	Libertad/Limpeño	Deportivo Capiatá
2019	Clausura	Libertad/Limpeño	Sol de América
2021	Apertura	Cerro Porteño	Deportivo Capiatá
2021	Clausura	Cerro Porteño	Sol de América
2022	Apertura	Olimpia	Libertad/Limpeño
2022	Clausura	Olimpia	Cerro Porteño
2023	Apertura	Olimpia	Libertad/Limpeño
2023	Clausura	Olimpia	Guaraní

== See also ==
- Copa eFe
