= Santiago Salcedo =

Paraguayan footballer (born 1981)

Personal information
- Full name: Santiago Gabriel Salcedo González
- Date of birth: 6 September 1981 (age 45)
- Place of birth: Asunción, Paraguay
- Height: 1.83 m (6 ft 0 in)
- Position: Forward

Team information
- Current team: Sol de América
- Number: 7

Senior career*
Years	Team	Apps	(Gls)
2001–2005	Cerro Porteño	61	(22)
2003–2004	→ Ankaragücü (loan)	8	(1)
2005–2006	FC Tokyo	18	(6)
2006–2009	Newell's Old Boys	74	(18)
2007	→ Chiapas (loan)	17	(0)
2008	→ River Plate (loan)	16	(2)
2009–2012	Lanús	45	(14)
2011	→ Argentinos Juniors (loan)	27	(9)
2012–2016	Cerro Porteño	48	(17)
2013–2014	→ Banfield (loan)	58	(23)
2015	→ Sol de América (loan)	43	(30)
2016–2018	Libertad	88	(49)
2018–2019	Deportivo Capiatá	52	(23)
2020	Guaireña	20	(5)
2020–2022	Sportivo San Lorenzo	10	(3)
2022	General Caballero JLM	12	(3)
2022–	Sol de América	33	(5)

International career
2003–2017	Paraguay	6	(0)
- * Club domestic league appearances and goals as of 10:37, 12 October 2020 (UTC)

Santiago Gabriel Salcedo González (born 6 September 1981), nicknamed Sasá, is a Paraguayan association football player currently playing for Sol de América in Primera División Paraguaya.

Salcedo is the maximum goal scorer in the history of the Primera División Paraguaya, and Paraguayan football with 152 goals, ahead of Hernan Rodrigo Lopez (127), Juan Eduardo Samudio (119) and Fredy Bareiro (112).

Salcedo ranked number 10 in a list of the most expensive players in Paraguayan football for 2015 published by Diario Extra.

== Career ==
Salcedo was the top scorer of the 2005 Copa Libertadores playing for Paraguayan side Cerro Porteño. He scored nine goals in the competition. The striker then played for FC Tokyo of Japan, but was loaned in the second half of 2006 to Newell's Old Boys of Argentina, after having problems with his coach Alexandre Gallo at FC Tokyo. Salcedo was then loaned to Mexican side Chiapas for the 2007 Clausura, but returned to Newell's Old Boys for the start of the 2007–08 season. After scoring nine goals during the 2008 Clausura (including the winning goal against Rosario Central in the Rosario derby), he joined River Plate by request of coach Diego Simeone.

After the departure of Simeone and River finishing in the last place of the 2008 Apertura, Salcedo returned to Newell's for the 2009 Clausura tournament. On 7 August 2009, Lanús signed the Paraguayan striker on a joint-ownership deal.

After a short spell in Argentinos Juniors he returned to Cerro Porteño. Salcedo was considered by Hércules to be David Trezeguet's replacement following the 2010/11 season. Salcedo was recommended by national team colleague, Nelson Haedo Valdez, who at the time was playing at Hercules.

On 5 August 2013, Santiago signed for Club Atlético Banfield on loan from Cerro Porteño, competing in Primera B Nacional of Argentina.

On 1 January 2016, Salcedo was transferred to Club Libertad for the 2016 Primera División Paraguaya season after being on loan to Sol de América from Cerro Porteño in 2015.

In January 2021, it was announced that Salcedo would continue his career in Paraguay's second-tier with Sportivo San Lorenzo. He will be coached by his brother, Jose Domingo Salcedo, and Salcedo opted to stay at Sportivo San Lorenzo to give the club promotion back to the first-tier.

In December 2021, Salcedo's return to the Primera División in 2022 was confirmed when the 40-year-old was announced as a signing for newly promoted General Caballero JLM. Already with 152 goals in Paraguay's top-tier, Salcedo commented that he wished to be the league's leading goal scorer in 2022. On 9 January 2022 of Paraguay's summer transfer window, Salcedo's transfer was officially complete.

== Club statistics ==
Club performance			League		Cup		League Cup		Total	
Season	Club	League	Apps	Goals	Apps	Goals	Apps	Goals	Apps	Goals
Paraguay			League		Cup		League Cup		Total	
2001	Cerro Porteño	Primera División	8	1					8	1
2002	Cerro Porteño	Primera División	33	10					33	10
2003	Cerro Porteño	Primera División	6	2					6	2
Turkey			League		Türkiye Kupası		League Cup		Total	
2003/04	Ankaragücü	Süper Lig	8	1					8	1
Paraguay			League		Cup		League Cup		Total	
2004	Cerro Porteño	Primera División	0	0					0	0
2005	Cerro Porteño	Primera División	17	9					17	9
Japan			League		Emperor's Cup		J.League Cup		Total	
2005	FC Tokyo	J1 League	12	5	2	0	0	0	14	5
2006	FC Tokyo	J1 League	6	1	0	0	4	0	10	1
Argentina			League		Cup		League Cup		Total	
2006/07	Newell's Old Boys	Primera División	19	5					19	5
Mexico			League		Cup		League Cup		Total	
2006/07	Jaguares Chiapas	Primera División	17	0					17	0
Japan			League		Emperor's Cup		J.League Cup		Total	
2007/08	Newell's Old Boys	Primera División	37	12					37	12
2008/09	River Plate	Primera División	16	2					16	2
2008/09	Newell's Old Boys	Primera División	18	1					18	1
2009/10	Lanús	Primera División								
2011	Argentinos Juniors	Primera División								
2012/13	Cerro Porteño	Primera División								
2009/10	Club Atlético Banfield	Nacional B								
Country	Paraguay		64	23					64	23
Country	Turkey		8	1					8	1
Country	Japan		18	6	2	0	4	0	24	6
Country	Argentina		90	20					90	20
Country	Mexico		17	0					17	0
Total			197	50	2	0	4	0	203	50

== National team statistics ==
Paraguay national team
Year	Apps	Goals
2003	1	0
2004	0	0
2005	2	0
2012	1	0
2017	1	0
Total	5	0

== Honours ==
=== Individual ===
- Maximum goal scorer of Paraguayan football with 152 goals

== See also ==
- Players and Records in Paraguayan Football
