= Julio González (footballer, born 1992) =

Paraguayan footballer

Personal information
- Full name: Julio César González Trinidad
- Date of birth: 28 June 1992 (age 34)
- Place of birth: Carapeguá, Paraguay
- Height: 1.76 m (5 ft 9 in)
- Position: Centre-back

Team information
- Current team: Sportivo Ameliano
- Number: 26

Senior career*
Years	Team	Apps	(Gls)
2013–2014	Sportivo Carapeguá		
2014–2018	General Díaz	107	(2)
2018–2020	Defensa y Justicia	27	(0)
2020–2022	Necaxa	41	(0)
2022	→ Guaraní (loan)	32	(1)
2023–	Sportivo Ameliano	85	(1)
- * Club domestic league appearances and goals as of 13 August 2025

Julio César González Trinidad (born 28 June 1992) is a Paraguayan professional footballer who plays as a centre-back for Paraguayan club Sportivo Ameliano.

== Career ==
Sportivo Carapeguá were González's first senior club. He made his professional debut with them in the Paraguayan Primera División on 1 September 2013, featuring for the full duration of a 2–2 home draw with Guaraní. He was selected in further fixtures with Cerro Porteño and Rubio Ñu during the 2013 season, which concluded with Sportivo Carapeguá suffering relegation. González was subsequently signed by top-flight General Díaz midway through the 2014 Paraguayan División Intermedia. He remained for four years, notching one hundred and nine appearances whilst scoring twice; notably his first versus Sol de América in 2017.

On 18 July 2018, González joined Defensa y Justicia of the Argentine Primera División. His first appearance arrived against Rosario Central two months later.

== Career statistics ==
As of 11 October 2018.

Club statistics
Club	Season	League			Cup (Note: Includes the Copa Paraguay and Copa Argentina)		League Cup		Continental (Note: Includes the Copa Sudamericana)		Other		Total	
Club	Season	Division	Apps	Goals	Apps	Goals	Apps	Goals	Apps	Goals	Apps	Goals	Apps	Goals
General Díaz	2014	Paraguayan Primera División	2	0	—		—		0	0	0	0	2	0
General Díaz	2015	Paraguayan Primera División	26	0	—		—		—		0	0	26	0
General Díaz	2016	Paraguayan Primera División	17	0	—		—		—		0	0	17	0
General Díaz	2017	Paraguayan Primera División	40	1	—		—		—		0	0	40	1
General Díaz	2018	Paraguayan Primera División	22	1	0	0	—		2 (Note: Two appearances in the 2018 Copa Sudamericana)	0	0	0	24	1
General Díaz	Total		107	2	0	0	—		2	0	0	0	109	2
Defensa y Justicia	2018–19	Argentine Primera División	3	0	0	0	—		0	0	0	0	3	0
Career total			110	2	0	0	—		2	0	0	0	112	2
