= Juan Pablo Pumpido =

Argentine football manager

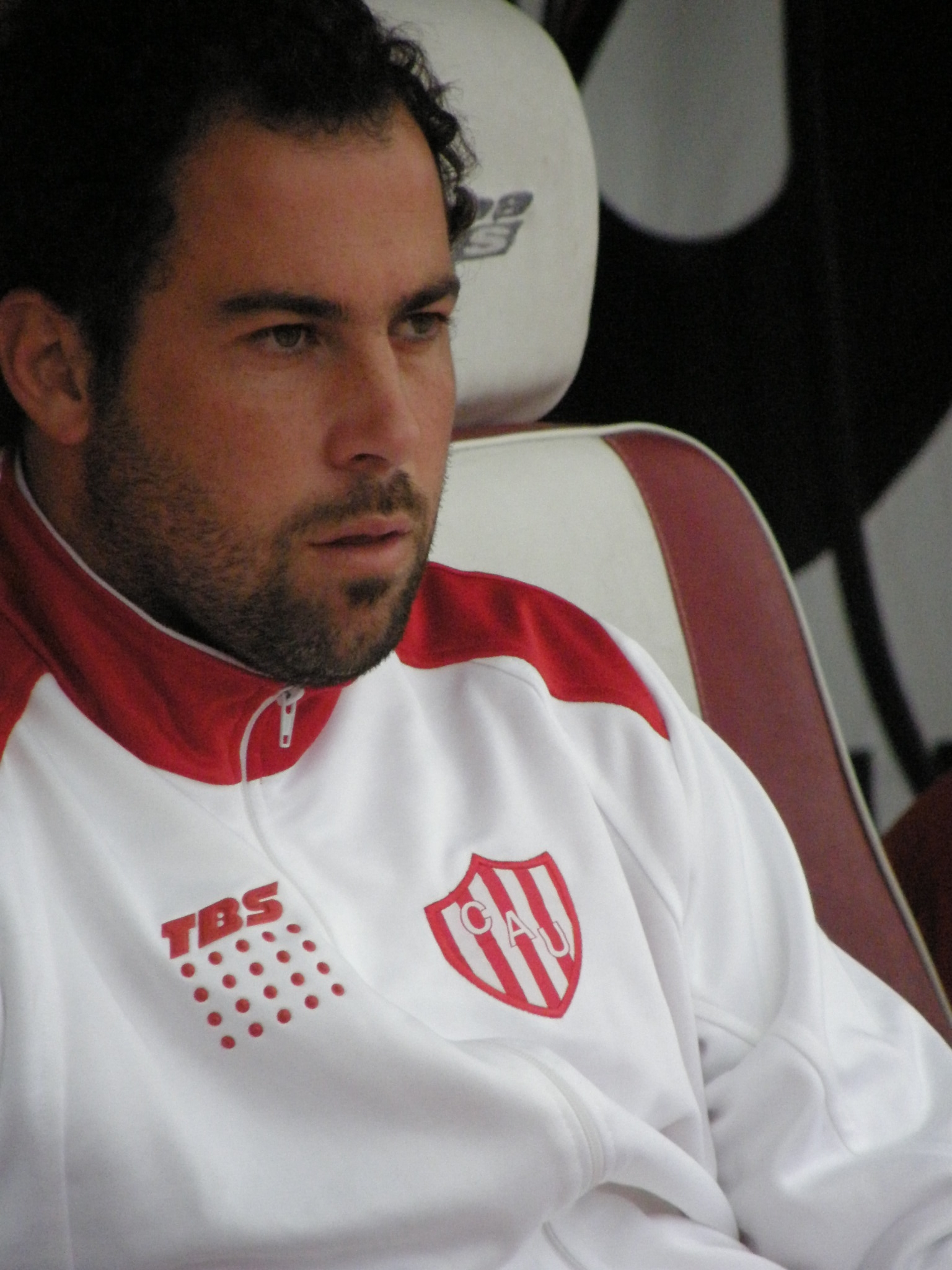
- Pumpido with Unión de Santa Fe in 2012

Personal information
- Full name: Juan Pablo Pumpido
- Date of birth: 21 December 1982 (age 43)
- Place of birth: Santa Fe, Argentina
- Position: Midfielder

Youth career
- Years: Team
- Unión Santa Fe
- Platense
- San Lorenzo

Managerial career
- 2007–2010: Santa Fe FC
- 2010–2011: Independiente Rivadavia (assistant)
- 2011: Unión Santa Fe (youth)
- 2012: Godoy Cruz (assistant)
- 2012: Unión Santa Fe (assistant)
- 2013–2014: Unión Santa Fe (youth)
- 2014–2015: Olimpia (assistant)
- 2015–2016: Unión Santa Fe (youth)
- 2016: Unión Santa Fe (interim)
- 2017: Unión Santa Fe
- 2017–2018: Patronato
- 2019–2020: Alvarado
- 2021–2022: Sol de América
- 2022: Sportivo Ameliano
- 2023: Guaraní
- 2023–2024: Nacional Asunción
- 2024–2025: Sportivo Luqueño

Juan Pablo Pumpido (born 21 December 1982) is an Argentine football manager.

== Career ==
Pumpido was born in Santa Fe. After playing youth football at Unión de Santa Fe, Platense and San Lorenzo, he retired at the age of 21 and studied to become a sports journalist.

In 2005, Pumpido joined Santa Fe Fútbol Club as a sporting manager, and was later named first team manager of the club in 2007. In March 2010, he left to become an assistant of Roberto Trotta (one of the founders of Santa Fe FC) at Independiente Rivadavia.

In January 2012, after a brief period back at Unión as a manager of the club's sixth division, Pumpido joined his father's staff at Godoy Cruz. He then returned to Unión with his father in August, before taking over the club's fourth division in 2013.

Pumpido was also an assistant of his father at Paraguayan side Olimpia in 2014, before returning to Unión in November 2015. Initially a manager of the reserve side, he was named interim manager of the first team on 2 November 2016, after Leonardo Madelón resigned.

After winning 11 points out of 18, Pumpido was definitely appointed as manager for the 2017 campaign, but resigned on 22 April. On 11 July, he was presented as manager of Patronato.

Pumpido was sacked by Patronato on 16 September 2018, and was named in charge of Alvarado the following 7 July. On 22 June 2020, he opted to leave the club on the expiration of his contract on 30 June.

On 10 June 2021, Pumpido moved abroad for the first time in his career, after being appointed manager of Paraguayan Primera División side Sol de América. He resigned the following 3 April, and took over fellow top tier side Sportivo Ameliano on 18 September 2022.

On 20 November 2022, after avoiding relegation, winning the 2022 Copa Paraguay and subsequently qualifying the club to their first-ever international tournament, the 2023 Copa Sudamericana, Pumpido resigned. He took over Guaraní in the same country the following 9 June, replacing Rodrigo López, but was sacked on 13 August 2023; thirteen days later, he was appointed at Nacional Asunción of the same division.

On 31 March 2024, Pumpido resigned from Nacional, and took over fellow top tier side Sportivo Luqueño on 3 September. He also resigned from the latter on 1 February 2025.

== Personal life ==
Pumpido's father Nery was a footballer and was also a manager.

== Honours ==
Sportivo Ameliano

- Copa Paraguay: 2022
