= Alfredo Mazacotte =

Paraguayan footballer (born 1987)

Personal information
- Full name: Alfredo Carlos Alberto Mazacotte
- Date of birth: 17 November 1987 (age 38)
- Place of birth: Asunción, Paraguay
- Height: 1.62 m (5 ft 4 in)
- Position: Attacking midfielder

Team information
- Current team: Resistencia

Youth career
- Sportivo Ameliano
- Tacuary

Senior career*
Years	Team	Apps	(Gls)
2009–2013	Tacuary	75	(11)
2011	→ Sportivo Luqueño (loan)	4	(0)
2012–2013	→ Sol de América (loan)	34	(7)
2013	Nacional Asunción	10	(2)
2014	Rubio Ñú	14	(1)
2014–2015	Sol de América	22	(3)
2015	Ayacucho	6	(1)
2016	Deportivo Capiatá	5	(1)
2016	River Plate Asunción	18	(5)
2017	Cienciano	26	(8)
2018–	Resistencia		
- * Club domestic league appearances and goals as of 23 April 2018

Alfredo Carlos Alberto Mazacotte (born 17 November 1987 in Asunción, Paraguay) is a Paraguayan Association footballer who currently plays for Resistencia SC.

== Career ==
Mazacotte joined Club Sol de América before the start of the 2014–15 Paraguayan Primera División season after spells with Rubio Ñú and Nacional Asunción. He moved to Peru in 2015, joining Ayacucho FC.
