= Santiago Rojas =

Paraguayan football player (born 1996)

Personal information
- Full name: Santiago Gerardo Rojas López
- Date of birth: 5 April 1996 (age 30)
- Place of birth: Luque, Paraguay
- Height: 1.85 m (6 ft 1 in)
- Position: Goalkeeper

Team information
- Current team: Nacional
- Number: 30

Senior career*
Years	Team	Apps	(Gls)
2015–	Nacional	267	(0)
2023	→ Tigre (loan)	15	(0)
2024	→ Atlético Nacional (loan)	3	(0)

International career^{‡}
2018–	Paraguay	2	(0)
- * Club domestic league appearances and goals as of 15 November 2026 ‡ National team caps and goals as of 26 July 2023

Santiago Gerardo Rojas López (born 5 April 1996) is a Paraguay international footballer who plays as a goalkeeper for Nacional and the Paraguay national team.

== Career ==
Rojas made his debut for Nacional.

=== International ===
Rojas was called up to the Paraguay squad for the first time in November 2018.
