= Martín Batallini =

Argentine professional footballer

Personal information
- Full name: Martín Leonel Batallini
- Date of birth: 19 August 1991 (age 35)
- Place of birth: Don Torcuato, Argentina
- Height: 1.74 m (5 ft 9 in)
- Position: Forward

Team information
- Current team: San Telmo

Youth career
- Defensores de Belgrano

Senior career*
Years	Team	Apps	(Gls)
2010–2013	Defensores de Belgrano	46	(7)
2013–2014	Deportivo Merlo	23	(2)
2015–2016	Estudiantes BA	11	(0)
2016–2018	San Miguel	60	(17)
2018	Deportivo Lara	17	(4)
2019	All Boys	5	(0)
2019	San Miguel	15	(4)
2020	Niki Volos	8	(2)
2020–2021	Almirante Brown	32	(5)
2022	12 de Octubre	31	(4)
2023	Deportivo Riestra	16	(1)
2023–2024	Almirante Brown	20	(0)
2024–2025	San Miguel	35	(6)
2025–2026	Talleres RdE	20	(2)
2026–	San Telmo	10	(2)
- * Club domestic league appearances and goals as of 17:01, 6 May 2026 (UTC)

Martín Leonel Batallini (born 19 August 1991) is an Argentine professional footballer who plays as a forward for San Telmo.

== Career ==
Defensores de Belgrano were Batallini's first team. He scored seven times in three seasons with the Primera B Metropolitana outfit, two of which were strikes in games against Almagro. On 9 July 2013, Batallini moved across the division to Deportivo Merlo. Tristán Suárez was the opponent for his club debut, as he featured for sixty-one minutes of a 3–0 defeat. The first of his two goals for Deportivo Merlo arrived in the succeeding March versus Deportivo Armenio, before the other came in October 2014 against Atlanta. Batallini spent 2015 and 2016 with Estudiantes, prior to joining Primera C Metropolitana's San Miguel.

After two seasons with San Miguel, the first of which ended with promotion from tier four, Batallini swapped Argentina for Venezuela in July 2018 by agreeing terms with Primera División side Deportivo Lara. Four goals in his first thirteen appearances occurred, with the forward scoring in 2–0 wins over Zamora, Zulia, Carabobo and Aragua; as they lost in the Serie Final to Zamora. January 2019 saw Batallini return to his homeland with All Boys. He made five appearances for them, though just one was as a starter - his debut versus Fénix on 2 February. He left in June to spend the rest of 2019 back with San Miguel.

After scoring four times in fifteen games for El Trueno Verde, Batallini headed to Greek football in January 2020 after agreeing terms with Football League outfit Niki Volos. Eight matches and two goals soon occurred, in a campaign which ended early due to the COVID-19 pandemic. September 2020 saw Batallini return to Argentina with Almirante Brown. In January 2022, Batallini moved abroad, as he signed with Paraguayan side 12 de Octubre.

== Personal life ==
Batallini's brother, Pablo, also played football at a professional level; notably playing alongside him whilst with Deportivo Merlo.

== Career statistics ==
As of 10 October 2020.

Appearances and goals by club, season and competition
Club	Season	League			Cup		League Cup		Continental		Other		Total	
Club	Season	Division	Apps	Goals	Apps	Goals	Apps	Goals	Apps	Goals	Apps	Goals	Apps	Goals
Defensores de Belgrano	2012–13	Primera B Metropolitana	26	3	0	0	—		—		0	0	26	3
Deportivo Merlo	2013–14	Primera B Metropolitana	14	1	1	0	—		—		0	0	15	1
Deportivo Merlo	2014	Primera B Metropolitana	9	1	0	0	—		—		0	0	9	1
Deportivo Merlo	Total		23	2	1	0	—		—		0	0	24	2
Estudiantes	2015	Primera B Metropolitana	11	0	1	0	—		—		0	0	12	0
Estudiantes	2016	Primera B Metropolitana	0	0	0	0	—		—		0	0	0	0
Estudiantes	Total		11	0	1	0	—		—		0	0	12	0
San Miguel	2016–17	Primera C Metropolitana	31	8	0	0	—		—		0	0	31	8
San Miguel	2017–18	Primera B Metropolitana	29	9	0	0	—		—		0	0	29	9
San Miguel	Total		60	17	0	0	—		—		0	0	60	17
Deportivo Lara	2018	Primera División	17	4	0	0	—		—		5 (Note: Appearance(s) in the Primera División play-offs)	0	22	4
All Boys	2018–19	Primera B Metropolitana	5	0	0	0	—		—		0	0	5	0
San Miguel	2019–20	Primera B Metropolitana	15	4	0	0	—		—		0	0	15	4
Niki Volos	2019–20	Football League	8	2	0	0	—		—		0	0	8	2
Almirante Brown	2020–21	Primera B Metropolitana	0	0	0	0	—		—		0	0	0	0
Career total			165	32	2	0	—		—		5	0	172	32
