= Jorge Guerrero (Paraguayan footballer) =

Paraguayan footballer (born 1988)

Personal information
- Full name: Jorge Adrián Guerrero Ortiz
- Date of birth: 17 October 1988 (age 38)
- Place of birth: Santísima Trinidad, Asunción, Paraguay
- Position: Forward

Team information
- Current team: Deportivo Santaní

Senior career*
Years	Team	Apps	(Gls)
- Pilcomayo
- Sportivo Iteño
- 29 de Setiembre
2012	Deportes Puerto Montt	24	(6)
2013	Fernando de la Mora		
2014	Sportivo Luqueño		
2015	Tacuary		
2016	Guabirá	1	(0)
2016	General Caballero ZC	14	(1)
2017	Caacupé FBC		
2018	8 de Diciembre Caacupé		
2018	Deportivo Caaguazú		
2019	8 de Diciembre SE		
2019–2020	Fulgencio Yegros		
2021	Sport Primavera		
2021	Deportivo Itapuense		
2022	Martín Ledesma		
2022	Sportivo San Lorenzo		
2023	12 de Octubre	7	(1)
2024	Independiente FBC	10	(1)
2024–	Deportivo Santaní	10	(1)
- * Club domestic league appearances and goals as of 19 November 2024

Jorge Adrián Guerrero Ortiz (born 17 October 1988 in Paraguay) is a Paraguayan footballer who plays as a forward for Deportivo Santaní.

== Teams ==
- (Paraguay) Pilcomayo
- (Paraguay) Sportivo Iteño
- (Paraguay) 29 de Setiembre
- (Chile) Deportes Puerto Montt 2012
- (Paraguay) Fernando de la Mora 2013
- (Paraguay) Sportivo Luqueño 2014
- (Paraguay) Tacuary 2015
- (Bolivia) Guabirá 2016
- (Paraguay) General Caballero ZC 2016
- (Paraguay) Caacupé FBC 2017
- (Paraguay) 8 de Diciembre de Caacupé 2018
- (Paraguay) Deportivo Caaguazú 2018
- (Paraguay) 8 de Diciembre de San Estanislao 2019
- (Paraguay) Fulgencio Yegros 2019–2020
- (Paraguay) Sport Primavera 2021
- (Paraguay) Deportivo Itapuense 2021
- (Paraguay) Martín Ledesma 2022
- (Paraguay) Sportivo San Lorenzo 2022
- (Paraguay) 12 de Octubre 2023
- (Paraguay) Independiente FBC 2024
- (Paraguay) Deportivo Santaní 2024–Present
