= Matías Verdún =

Argentine professional footballer

Personal information
- Full name: Matías Edgardo Verdún
- Date of birth: 18 January 1997 (age 29)
- Place of birth: Argentina
- Position: Midfielder

Youth career
- Nueva Chicago
- 2016–2018: Comunicaciones

Senior career*
Years	Team	Apps	(Gls)
2018–2019	Comunicaciones	2	(0)
2019	Luján	3	(0)
- * Club domestic league appearances and goals

Matías Edgardo Verdún (born 18 January 1997) is an Argentine professional footballer who plays as a midfielder.

== Career ==
Having played in the Nueva Chicago youth system, Verdún moved to Comunicaciones in 2016. He made his professional debut under manager Sergio Leroy in April 2018 in a match against Colegiales, where he substituted for Julián Antonio Barría during a 1–3 victory. His next appearance in the Primera B Metropolitana came twelve months later against San Miguel. In July 2019, Verdún transferred to Luján, making three appearances in the Primera C Metropolitana before leaving the team.

== Career statistics ==
As of 24 October 2020.

Appearances and goals by club, season and competition
Club	Season	League			Cup		League Cup		Continental		Other		Total	
Club	Season	Division	Apps	Goals	Apps	Goals	Apps	Goals	Apps	Goals	Apps	Goals	Apps	Goals
Comunicaciones	2017–18	Primera B Metropolitana	1	0	0	0	—		—		0	0	1	0
Comunicaciones	2018–19	Primera B Metropolitana	1	0	0	0	—		—		0	0	1	0
Comunicaciones	Total		2	0	0	0	—		—		0	0	2	0
Luján	2019–20	Primera C Metropolitana	3	0	0	0	—		—		0	0	3	0
Career total			5	0	0	0	—		—		0	0	5	0
