= Édgar Zaracho =

Paraguayan footballer (born 1989)

Edgar Zaracho
Personal information
- Full name: Edgar Catalino Zaracho Zorrilla
- Date of birth: 25 November 1989 (age 36)
- Place of birth: Fernando de la Mora, Paraguay
- Height: 1.79 m (5 ft 10 in)
- Positions: Defensive midfielder; wide midfielder

Team information
- Current team: Sportivo Ameliano
- Number: 6

Senior career*
Years	Team	Apps	(Gls)
2008–2012	Sport Colombia	40	(2)
2011	→ Colón de Santa Fe (loan)	0	(0)
2011	→ 3 de Febrero (loan)		
2014–2018	General Díaz	154	(14)
2019–2021	Club Nacional	83	(12)
2022–	Sportivo Ameliano	74	(3)
- * Club domestic league appearances and goals as of 13 August 2025

Edgar Catalino Zaracho Zorrilla (born 25 November 1989) is a Paraguayan football defender who plays for Sportivo Ameliano in the Primera División Paraguaya.

== Career ==
Zaracho has played for Sport Colombia and Colón de Santa Fe of Argentina.

On 19 January 2022, during the Paraguay's summer transfer window, Zaracho officially completed a transfer to Sportivo Ameliano. He joined coach Humberto García, with whom he was at General Díaz.
