= Virgen del Huerto =

Coordinates: 25.2750°S 57.5969°W

- Barrio
- Interactive map of Virgen del Huerto
- Country: Paraguay
- Autonomous Capital District: Gran Asunción
- City: Asunción

Virgen del Huerto is a neighbourhood (barrio) of Asunción, Paraguay.
