= Sportivo Ameliano =

Paraguayan football club

- Full name: Club Sportivo Ameliano
- Nickname: La V azulada(The bluish V)
- Founded: 6 January 1936; 90 years ago
- Ground: Estadio Ameliano Villeta, Villeta, Paraguay
- Capacity: 7,000
- Chairman: Héctor Melgarejo
- Manager: Roberto Nanni
- League: División de Honor
- 2025: División de Honor, 9th of 12
Home colours	Away colours	Third colours

Club Sportivo Ameliano, also simply known as Ameliano, is a Paraguayan football club based in Virgen del Huerto neighborhood in the city of Asunción. The club competes in the Paraguayan Primera División for the 2022 season after their promotion at the end of the 2021 Paraguayan División Intermedia.

The club was home to Alfredo Mazacotte who began his career in the youth teams of the club, and is actually the home of historic striker Marcos Caballero who played for the club from 2003–2021, the player was the leading goal scorer of the Primera División C of 2008 with 11 annotations along with Alberto Cristaldo of Deportivo Recoleta.

The ex-footballer and Argentine coach Oscar Paulin was credited for taking the club to the zone of promotion in 2015 and 2016. He achieved the promotion for the club from the fourth division to the third division in 2015 via a play-off and he put the club in the first position of the third division with two games remaining in the 2016 season – being one point from being assured at least the sub champion place – in what is considered as the most successful phase of the club. Ex-goal keeper of the Albirroja Celso Guerrero also was the coach of the club from 2012 to 2013.

The Bluish V has the notability of being recognized by The Guinness Book of Records for the most red cards in one game – referee William Weiler expelled 20 players in a game between Sportivo Ameliano and General Caballero on 1 of June 1993.

== History ==
It was founded on 6 of January 1936, in the zone of Villa Amelia of Asunción, exactly in the same place where today the Institute of Tropical Medicine is located on Venezuela Avenue, in this same place it had its first playing field. Years later, the field was transferred, in the same zone but closer to the Spain Avenue, in this location it obtained its first official title upon winning the 1959 third division and last division of Paraguayan football in those days. Later, in the decade 1970, it moved to a new field off the neighbor suburb called Barrio Jara until 1983 due to the order of the municipality of the sector it went to Barrio Virgin del Huerto, despite this, the club is popularly identified with Barrio Jara. In this period, constructs the Estadio José Tomás Silva, where it is actually exercised as a local today. Later, after many years in the last division of Paraguayan football, in the 1997, with the creation of the División Intermedia as the new second division, the club is one of a few that were sent to the Cuarta Division, the new last level of Paraguayan football for then. In this last category, obtained runner-up in 2000 a part from the promotion to the third division, but the following year, returns to relegation again in 2001.

In 1993, Sportivo Ameliano went into the Guinness Book of Records when in a youth match against General Caballero, a total of an astonishing 20 red cards were shown, the most red cards ever to be dished out in one game. Ian Battersby of The Guardian recorded that "The incident occurred in league match between Sportivo Ameliano and General Caballero in Paraguay. When two Sportivo players were sent off, a 10-minute fight ensued and the referee dismissed a further 18 players. The match, not surprisingly, was abandoned."

On 15 September 2003, Sportivo Ameliano were crowned champions of Paraguay's fourth division after defeated Capitán Figari 2–1. Sportivo Ameliano had been losing 1–0 until Carlos Paredes equalised in the 70th minute and substitute Marcos Caballero scored the winner in the 78th minute.

In 2006, the club obtains promotion again to the Third Division.

In 2013, the club was defeated in a two-legged promotion play-off played between the top four teams of the Paraguayan Primera División C.

In 2015, both Sportivo Ameliano and Deportivo Recoleta gained promotion from the Primera División C to the Primera División B for the 2016 season. It had been in the Primera División C since 2008.

During May of the 2016 Primera División B Metropolitana, long time club striker Marcos Caballero scored in a 1–0 victory vs. Colegiales to put Sportivo Ameliano in the leading clubs at the top of the league table.

On 4 November 2022, Sportivo Ameliano achieved the biggest feat in its history by winning the 2022 Copa Paraguay, beating Nacional on penalty kicks after a 1–1 draw in regular time in the final. By winning the cup, the club also secured a first-time qualification for an international tournament, participating in the 2023 Copa Sudamericana, as well as the 2022 Supercopa Paraguay against the Primera División champions with better record in the aggregate table, which they also won by defeating Olimpia.

== Stadium ==
The club's stadium, the Estadio José Tomás Silva, is located one block away from the Universidad Americana, with the respective university being the club's main sponsor. The stadium's date of construction was in 1970 and has a capacity of 2,000. Its average number of spectators is 73.

== Honours ==
- Copa Paraguay: 1

2022

- Supercopa Paraguay: 1

2022

- Segunda de Ascenso/Primera División B: 2

1959, 2019

- Primera División C: 2

2003, 2006

== Current squad ==
As of 11 April, 2026 Note: Flags indicate national team as defined under FIFA eligibility rules; some limited exceptions apply. Players may hold more than one non-FIFA nationality.

No.	Pos.	Nation	Player
3	DF	PAR	Francisco Báez
5	DF	PAR	Hugo Benítez
6	MF	PAR	Jonathan Benítez
7	FW	PAR	Fredy Vera
8	MF	PAR	Estivel Moreira
9	FW	PAR	Cristhian Ocampos
10	FW	PAR	Elvio Vera (on loan from Libertad)
15	MF	PAR	Walter Rodríguez
17	FW	PAR	Carlos Favero (on loan from Cerro Porteño)
18	FW	PAR	Ariel Ávalos (on loan from Cerro Porteño)
19	DF	PAR	Abel Paredes
20	MF	ARG	Valentín Larralde
21	DF	PAR	Fabián Franco

No.	Pos.	Nation	Player
22	DF	ARG	Andrea Falabella
23	GK	PAR	Miguel Martínez
24	MF	PAR	Luis Ayala
25	FW	PAR	Bruno López
26	DF	PAR	Julio González
27	DF	PAR	Miguel Jacquet
28	FW	PAR	Jorge Sanguina (on loan from Colón)
30	MF	ARG	Raúl Cabral
32	FW	PAR	Alex Servían
34	DF	PAR	Miguel Benítez
35	GK	PAR	Ángel Sánchez
36	FW	PAR	Mathias León
37	DF	PAR	Tomás Lezcano
40	MF	PAR	Alberto Contrera

== Notable players ==
2000's

- (Paraguay) Alfredo Mazacotte
- (Paraguay) Marcos Caballero (2003–2021)

2010's

- (Argentina) Fabián Caballero (2013–2014)
- (Argentina) Sergio Escalante (2019–)

== Notable coaches ==
- (Paraguay) Pedro Fariña (2003) – Coached club to Fourth division title.
- Celso Guerrero (2012–2013) – Former footballer for Paraguay national team.
- (Argentina) Fabián Caballero (2014) – Former footballer for Arsenal F.C. and Dundee F.C. and first ever club player-coach.
- (Argentina) Oscar Paulín (2015–) – Coached the club to promotion from Paraguay's Fourth Division in 2015.

== Other disciplines ==
=== Futsal ===
The club's futsal division plays in the Categoría Honor, the second division of the Paraguayan futsal league system.
