= 2023 Copa Paraguay =

Tournament details
- Country: Paraguay
- Dates: 18 April – 2 December 2023
- Teams: 74

Final positions
- Champions: Libertad (2nd title)
- Runners-up: Sportivo Trinidense
- Third place: Nacional
- Copa Libertadores: Nacional

Tournament statistics
- Matches played: 78
- Goals scored: 246 (3.15 per match)

The 2023 Copa Paraguay was the fifth edition of the Copa Paraguay, Paraguay's domestic football cup competition organized by the Paraguayan Football Association (APF). The competition began on 18 April and ended on 2 December 2023, with the winners qualifying for the 2023 Supercopa Paraguay against the Primera División champions with better record in the aggregate table.

Libertad were the champions, claiming their second Copa Paraguay title by beating Sportivo Trinidense on penalty kicks after a 1–1 draw in the final. As winners, Libertad were entitled to earn a berth into the 2024 Copa Libertadores, however since both finalists qualified for that competition via league performance, that berth was awarded to the third-placed team, Nacional.

Sportivo Ameliano were the defending champions, but were eliminated by Sportivo Trinidense in the quarter-finals.

== Format ==
Although the Copa Paraguay kept the number of participating clubs and format used in 2022, the Paraguayan Football Association (APF) confirmed that starting from this edition, the champions will qualify for the following year's Copa Libertadores, taking the Paraguay 4 berth in the competition, except if they have already qualified via league performance or play in a tier other than Primera División, in which case that right will go to the cup runners-up or third-placed team (or best-placed team in the Primera División's aggregate table if the runners-up or third-placed team also meet any of those conditions, in that order).

For the first stage, the Football Union of the Interior (UFI) clubs were paired according to their geographical location into seven single-legged ties and a triangular group with the remaining three teams, with the winners of the seven ties and the top two teams of the triangular advancing to the next round. The 17 Primera B clubs were drawn in a similar arrangement to the UFI zone except that the ties were decided by a draw, while the 12 Primera C clubs were drawn into six single-legged ties. Nine Primera B teams, six Primera C ones, and nine UFI ones advanced to the next round, where they were joined by the 16 División Intermedia clubs. The 40 clubs competing in the second stage were drawn into 20 single-legged ties, with the winners advancing to the third stage where they were drawn against the 12 Primera División clubs. The 16 third stage winners will advance to the round of 16. Ties in all rounds will be played on a single-legged basis, with a penalty shootout deciding the winner in case of a draw.

== Teams ==
The 2023 edition will have a total of 74 participating teams:

Primera División

- Cerro Porteño
- General Caballero (JLM)
- Guaireña
- Guaraní
- Libertad
- Nacional
- Olimpia
- Resistencia
- Sportivo Ameliano
- Sportivo Luqueño
- Sportivo Trinidense
- Tacuary

División Intermedia

- 2 de Mayo
- 3 de Febrero (CDE)
- 12 de Octubre (I)
- 24 de Setiembre (VP)
- Atlético Colegiales
- Atyrá
- Deportivo Recoleta
- Deportivo Santaní
- Fernando de la Mora
- Independiente (CG)
- Martín Ledesma
- Pastoreo
- Rubio Ñu
- San Lorenzo
- Sol de América
- Sportivo Carapeguá

Primera B

- 3 de Febrero (RB)
- 3 de Noviembre
- 29 de Setiembre
- Atlántida
- Benjamín Aceval
- Cristóbal Colón (JAS)
- Cristóbal Colón (Ñ)
- Deportivo Capiatá
- General Díaz
- Humaitá
- Olimpia (Itá)
- Presidente Hayes
- River Plate
- Silvio Pettirossi
- Sportivo Iteño
- Sportivo Limpeño
- Tembetary

Primera C

- 1° de Marzo (FDM)
- 12 de Octubre (SD)
- Atlético Juventud
- Capitán Figari
- Fulgencio Yegros
- General Caballero (CG)
- General Caballero (ZC)
- Oriental
- Pilcomayo
- Sport Colombia
- Sport Colonial
- Valois Rivarola

UFI

The champions from each of the 17 departments of Paraguay qualified for the competition:

- Sport Santa Cecilia (Concepción)
- 14 de Mayo (C) (San Pedro)
- Teniente Brozzon (Cordillera)
- Cerro Porteño (M) (Guairá)
- Universidad Católica (Caaguazú)
- 14 de Mayo (FY) (Caazapá)
- Sportivo San Pedro (Itapúa)
- Libertad (SP) (Misiones)
- Sol de Mayo (Paraguarí)
- Guaraní (MG) (Alto Paraná)
- Unión Ybyraró (Central)
- 1° de Marzo (P) (Ñeembucú)
- Atlético Amambay (Amambay)
- General Caballero (K) (Canindeyú)
- Independiente (N) (Presidente Hayes)
- Cerro Porteño (F) (Boquerón)
- Sport Hernancito (Alto Paraguay)

== First stage ==
The draw for the first stage was held on 24 March 2023 and matches were played from 18 April to 24 May 2023.

18 April 2023	Cristóbal Colón (Ñ)	1–2	Silvio Pettirossi	Ypané
16:00 UTC−4	Lugo 27'	Report	González 23'; Quintana 43'	Stadium: Centro de Alto Rendimiento de Fútbol Femenino; Referee: Blas Romero

18 April 2023	Libertad (SP)	0–2	1° de Marzo (P)	Ypané
18:30 UTC−4		Report	N. Benítez 67'; Ruiz Díaz 82'	Stadium: Centro de Alto Rendimiento de Fútbol Femenino; Referee: Ángel Fleytas

19 April 2023	3 de Noviembre	3–1	29 de Setiembre	San Lorenzo
16:00 UTC−4	H. Herrera 33'; Espínola 76' (o.g.); Torres 89'	Report	Núñez 44'	Stadium: Gunther Vogel; Referee: Nelson Palma

19 April 2023	Sportivo Iteño	1–3	Sportivo Limpeño	San Lorenzo
18:30 UTC−4	Pereira 62'	Report	Cáceres 40', 60'; Palma 45+8'	Stadium: Gunther Vogel; Referee: Julio Ojeda

20 April 2023	Teniente Brozzon	0–6	Unión Ybyraró	Capiatá
16:00 UTC−4		Report	M. Martínez 9', 74'; R. Martínez 33'; D. Fernández 64' (pen.); Oporto 68'; Ovelar 80'	Stadium: Erico Galeano; Referee: Víctor Ruíz

20 April 2023	3 de Febrero (RB)	0–1	Deportivo Capiatá	Capiatá
18:30 UTC−4		Report	Coronel 72'	Stadium: Erico Galeano; Referee: César Rolón

25 April 2023	Guaraní (MG)	0–1	Universidad Católica	Villarrica
16:45 UTC−4		Report	Duarte 56'	Stadium: Parque del Guairá; Referee: Osmar Soto

25 April 2023	Cerro Porteño (M)	2–2 (5–3 p)	Sol de Mayo	Villarrica
19:00 UTC−4	Bogado 19'; Paniagua 48'	Report	Florenciano 39'; Sánchez 64'	Stadium: Parque del Guairá; Referee: Édgar Galeano
	Penalties
	Duarte (penalty scored); Fariña (penalty scored); Gaona (penalty scored); Arias (penalty scored); Paniagua (penalty scored)		(penalty scored) C. Ayala; (penalty scored) Samaniego; (penalty missed) Morán; (penalty scored) L. Ayala

26 April 2023	14 de Mayo (FY)	1–1 (2–4 p)	Sportivo San Pedro	Encarnación
18:30 UTC−4	Álvarez 28'	Report	Garay 85'	Stadium: Villa Alegre; Referee: Ángel Fleytas
	Penalties
	Álvarez (penalty scored); Moudelle (penalty missed); Gamarra (penalty scored); Pereira (penalty missed)		(penalty scored) Recalde; (penalty scored) Torres; (penalty scored) Colmán; (penalty scored) Trinidad

27 April 2023	Humaitá	2–2 (2–4 p)	General Díaz	Asunción
18:30 UTC−4	Arrúa 33'; Andino 37'	Report	Cabañas 31', 59'	Stadium: La Arboleda; Referee: Blas Romero
	Penalties
	Ruiz (penalty scored); Florentín (penalty missed); Morro (penalty missed); Arrúa (penalty scored)		(penalty scored) Cabañas; (penalty scored) Escudero; (penalty scored) Bernal; (penalty scored) Ferreira

2 May 2023	Independiente (N)	3–3 (2–4 p)	Cerro Porteño (F)	Villa Hayes
16:00 UTC−4	Sosa 72', 90+4'; Acosta 82'	Report	González 34'; Villarta 57'; Rodríguez 61'	Stadium: Isidro Roussillón; Referee: Denis Ortega
	Penalties
	Sandoval (penalty missed); Sosa (penalty scored); Benítez (penalty missed); Carril (penalty scored)		(penalty missed) Ortíz; (penalty scored) Aquino; (penalty scored) Rolón; (penalty scored) Ruiz; (penalty scored) Urquiza

2 May 2023	Benjamín Aceval	2–1	Olimpia (Itá)	Villa Hayes
18:30 UTC−4	Castro 62', 73'	Report	Fleitas 2'	Stadium: Isidro Roussillón; Referee: José Armoa

3 May 2023	14 de Mayo (C)	6–1	General Caballero (K)	San Estanislao
15:00 UTC−4	Rodas 2', 12', 35'; E. Torres 26' (pen.); Mercado 85'; Rojas 90+1'	Report	P. González 10'	Stadium: La Catedral; Referee: Zulma Quiñónez

4 May 2023	Atlántida	2–3	Cristóbal Colón (JAS)	Ypané
18:30 UTC−4	C. Maciel 5' (pen.), 36' (pen.)	Report	Pérez 47', 66'; Torales 54'	Stadium: Centro de Alto Rendimiento de Fútbol Femenino; Referee: Aldo Quiñónez

9 May 2023	General Caballero (CG)	0–3	General Caballero (ZC)	San Lorenzo
16:00 UTC−4		Report	Ruffinelli 29'; Rojas 63', 74'	Stadium: Gunther Vogel; Referee: Samuel Morales

9 May 2023	Capitán Figari	0–1	12 de Octubre (SD)	San Lorenzo
18:30 UTC−4		Report	Lugo 90+4' (pen.)	Stadium: Gunther Vogel; Referee: Jhonatan González

10 May 2023	Sport Colonial	0–3	Valois Rivarola	Ypané
16:00 UTC−4		Report	Poletti 10'; Vargas 37', 58'	Stadium: Centro de Alto Rendimiento de Fútbol Femenino; Referee: Blas Romero

10 May 2023	Fulgencio Yegros	1–1 (0–3 p)	1° de Marzo (FDM)	Ypané
18:30 UTC−4	Funes 57'	Report	Pineda 16'	Stadium: Centro de Alto Rendimiento de Fútbol Femenino; Referee: José Armoa
	Penalties
	Genes (penalty missed); Ávalos (penalty missed); Barrientos (penalty missed)		(penalty scored) Montiel; (penalty scored) Fretes; (penalty missed) Vera; (penalty scored) Acosta

11 May 2023	Atlético Juventud	2–2 (1–4 p)	Oriental	Asunción
16:00 UTC−4	Cardozo 1', 31'	Report	Ortiz 44'; Cañete 63'	Stadium: La Arboleda; Referee: Aldo Quiñónez
	Penalties
	García (penalty scored); Cardozo (penalty missed); Aponte (penalty missed)		(penalty scored) J. Cabrera; (penalty scored) H. Ramírez; (penalty scored) Chamorro; (penalty scored) Valle

11 May 2023	Pilcomayo	1–3	Sport Colombia	Asunción
18:30 UTC−4	Pinto 39'	Report	Vázquez 34'; González 49'; Núñez 82'	Stadium: La Arboleda; Referee: César Rolón

=== Triangular groups ===
==== Primera B ====
Pos	Team	Pld	W	D	L	GF	GA	GD	Pts	Qualification
1	Tembetary	2	1	1	0	3	1	+2	4	Advance to Second stage
2	River Plate	2	1	0	1	3	3	0	3	Advance to Second stage
3	Presidente Hayes	2	0	1	1	2	4	−2	1	

Source: APF
Rules for classification: 1) Points, 2) Goal difference, 3) Goals for, 4) Drawing of lots.

27 April 2023	Presidente Hayes	1–3	River Plate	Asunción
16:00 UTC−4	G. González 25'	Report	M. González 57', 77' (pen.); Yegros 69'	Stadium: La Arboleda; Referee: Gedidías Zacarías

4 May 2023	Tembetary	1–1	Presidente Hayes	Ypané
16:00 UTC−4	Duarte 80'	Report	Merlo 12'	Stadium: Centro de Alto Rendimiento de Fútbol Femenino; Referee: Samuel Morales

24 May 2023	River Plate	0–2	Tembetary	Asunción
18:30 UTC−4		Report	Zárate 26'; Villamayor 45+1'	Stadium: Jardines del Kelito; Referee: César Rolón

==== UFI ====
Pos	Team	Pld	W	D	L	GF	GA	GD	Pts	Qualification
1	Sport Santa Cecilia	2	2	0	0	5	2	+3	6	Advance to Second stage
2	Atlético Amambay	2	1	0	1	7	5	+2	3	Advance to Second stage
3	Sport Hernancito	2	0	0	2	3	8	−5	0	

Source: APF
Rules for classification: 1) Points, 2) Goal difference, 3) Goals for, 4) Drawing of lots.

22 April 2023	Atlético Amambay	1–3	Sport Santa Cecilia	Pedro Juan Caballero
14:30 UTC−4	Álvarez 14'	Report	Grance 60'; Leguizamón 69'; E. Romero 90+3'	Stadium: Río Parapití; Referee: Zulma Quiñónez

25 April 2023	Sport Santa Cecilia	2–1	Sport Hernancito	Pedro Juan Caballero
14:30 UTC−4	W. Bonzi 7'; M. Bonzi 73'	Report	Soria 89'	Stadium: Río Parapití; Referee: José Franco

28 April 2023	Sport Hernancito	2–6	Atlético Amambay	Pedro Juan Caballero
14:30 UTC−4	Cuéllar 55'; Barros 73'	Report	Álvarez 6', 52' (pen.); Ferreira 22'; Ledezma 45+3'; Valdez 66'; Núñez 80'	Stadium: Río Parapití; Referee: Óscar Amarilla

== Second stage ==
The schedule for the second round was announced by the APF on 26 May 2023. Matches in this round were played from 6 to 22 June 2023.

6 June 2023	Sport Santa Cecilia	1–5	Rubio Ñu	San Estanislao
14:00 UTC−4	Zorrilla 87'	Report	Mereles 40'; Riveros 59'; Pacher 79', 81'; Melgarejo 90+2'	Stadium: Juan José Vázquez; Referee: Jhonatan González

6 June 2023	General Caballero (ZC)	0–0 (5–6 p)	Deportivo Santaní	San Estanislao
16:30 UTC−4		Report		Stadium: Juan José Vázquez; Referee: Víctor Ruiz
	Penalties
	Rojas (penalty missed); Rufinelli (penalty missed); Costa (penalty scored); Meza (penalty scored); Báez (penalty scored); Garay (penalty scored); González (penalty scored); Ortega (penalty missed)		(penalty missed) Cristaldo; (penalty scored) Lezcano; (penalty scored) Olmedo; (penalty scored) Acuña; (penalty missed) Florenciañez; (penalty scored) Cabrera; (penalty scored) Fernández; (penalty scored) Arce

7 June 2023	Cerro Porteño (F)	1–5	24 de Setiembre (VP)	Villa Hayes
14:00 UTC−4	Rodríguez 14'	Report	Villasboa 54'; J. González 58', 78', 90+4'; Salinas 65'	Stadium: Isidro Roussillón; Referee: Luis Urunaga

7 June 2023	Benjamín Aceval	1–2	Valois Rivarola	Villa Hayes
16:30 UTC−4	Cuevas 10'	Report	J. Galeano 39', 86' (pen.)	Stadium: Isidro Roussillón; Referee: Sergio Melgarejo

8 June 2023	1° de Marzo (P)	0–0 (3–5 p)	Cristóbal Colón (JAS)	Asunción
14:00 UTC−4		Report		Stadium: Jardines del Kelito; Referee: Julio Ojeda
	Penalties
	Bobadilla (penalty scored); Morales (penalty scored); Enciso (penalty scored); Medina (penalty missed)		(penalty scored) Matto; (penalty scored) Ayala; (penalty scored) Cardozo; (penalty scored) Arias; (penalty scored) Núñez

8 June 2023	Cerro Porteño (M)	1–3	Deportivo Recoleta	Asunción
16:30 UTC−4	I. Cardozo 66'	Report	Zorrilla 5'; Arrúa 74'; Salcedo 75'	Stadium: Jardines del Kelito; Referee: Édgar Barrios

13 June 2023	Oriental	3–1	Unión Ybyraró	San Lorenzo
16:00 UTC−4	Rotela 27'; Cardona 73'; Cañete 90+5'	Report	Fernández 9'	Stadium: Gunther Vogel; Referee: César Rolón

13 June 2023	12 de Octubre (SD)	0–1	San Lorenzo	San Lorenzo
18:30 UTC−4		Report	Rivarola 89'	Stadium: Gunther Vogel; Referee: Marco Franco

14 June 2023	Silvio Pettirossi	1–1 (5–3 p)	Pastoreo	Ciudad del Este
16:00 UTC−4	J. Amarilla 50'	Report	Herrera 25'	Stadium: Antonio Aranda; Referee: Marcos Galeano
	Penalties
	Duarte (penalty scored); Samaniego (penalty scored); J. Amarilla (penalty scored); González (penalty scored); Quintana (penalty scored)		(penalty scored) Mencia; (penalty scored) Herrera; (penalty scored) Machado; (penalty missed) Escobar

14 June 2023	Universidad Católica	0–3	3 de Febrero (CDE)	Ciudad del Este
18:30 UTC−4		Report	Vera 16', 42'; Duarte 65'	Stadium: Antonio Aranda; Referee: Zulma Quiñónez

15 June 2023	14 de Mayo (C)	2–3	3 de Noviembre	San Estanislao
13:30 UTC−4	Velázquez 10'; Rodas 29'	Report	Maciel 37'; Ayala 46'; Mancuello 77'	Stadium: La Catedral; Referee: Ángel Fleytas

15 June 2023	River Plate	2–3	Sportivo Carapeguá	Villa Elisa
16:00 UTC−4	Olmedo 26'; W. Martínez 78'	Report	Montiel 16'; Britez 21'; M. Giménez 90+1'	Stadium: Luis Alfonso Giagni; Referee: Nelson Palma

15 June 2023	Sportivo San Pedro	0–4	Sol de América	Villa Elisa
18:30 UTC−4		Report	Ruiz Díaz 4', 64', 72'; Fernández 38'	Stadium: Luis Alfonso Giagni; Referee: Jhonatan González

20 June 2023	1° de Marzo (FDM)	1–3	Atlético Colegiales	Asunción
16:00 UTC−4	Meza 90+2'	Report	Echeverría 33'; Romero 42'; Britos 78'	Stadium: Ricardo Gregor; Referee: Denis Ortega

20 June 2023	Deportivo Capiatá	0–2	Independiente (CG)	Asunción
18:30 UTC−4		Report	Villalba 51'; Briones 86'	Stadium: Ricardo Gregor; Referee: Dionicio Cristaldo

21 June 2023	Sport Colombia	2–7	Fernando de la Mora	Asunción
14:00 UTC−4	Ruiz Díaz 38'; Amarilla 49'	Report	Barrios 11', 45+1'; Caballero 26'; Fleitas 35', 89'; Vázquez 43' (o.g.); Bareiro 83'	Stadium: Emiliano Ghezzi; Referee: Arthur Afara

21 June 2023	Tembetary	0–1	Atyrá	Itauguá
16:30 UTC−4		Report	Arce 15'	Stadium: Luis Alberto Salinas; Referee: Jhonatan González

21 June 2023	Sportivo Limpeño	1–3	Martín Ledesma	Itauguá
19:00 UTC−4	Méndez 40'	Report	Galeano 12', 45+1', 90+2'	Stadium: Luis Alberto Salinas; Referee: Julio Ojeda

22 June 2023	Atlético Amambay	4–0	12 de Octubre (I)	Pedro Juan Caballero
16:00 UTC−4	Pereira 3'; Valdovinos 50'; Carvalho 81'; Ferreira 84'	Report		Stadium: Río Parapití; Referee: Luis Trinidad

22 June 2023	General Díaz	0–2	2 de Mayo	Pedro Juan Caballero
18:30 UTC−4		Report	Domínguez 38'; Zárate 45+1'	Stadium: Río Parapití; Referee: Marcos Galeano

== Bracket ==
Third stage
24 de Setiembre (VP)	1 (4)
Cerro Porteño (p)	1 (5)
Independiente (CG)	0
Sportivo Ameliano	3
Fernando de la Mora	1
Tacuary	2
3 de Febrero (CDE)	0
Sportivo Trinidense	1
Valois Rivarola	0
Guaraní	14
3 de Noviembre	0
Guaireña	3
Deportivo Recoleta	4
Atlético Colegiales	0
Atyrá (p)	1 (5)
Sportivo Carapeguá	1 (4)
San Lorenzo (p)	0 (7)
Olimpia	0 (6)
Sol de América	0
Libertad	3
2 de Mayo	2
Resistencia	0
Deportivo Santaní	1
General Caballero (JLM)	0
Cristóbal Colón (JAS)	0
Nacional	2
Oriental	0
Sportivo Luqueño	6
Silvio Pettirossi	0 (2)
Martín Ledesma (p)	0 (4)
Rubio Ñu	2
Atlético Amambay	1

Round of 16
Cerro Porteño	1
Sportivo Ameliano	3
Tacuary	1
Sportivo Trinidense	2
Guaraní	2
Guaireña	0
Deportivo Recoleta (p)	2 (5)
Atyrá	2 (4)
San Lorenzo	1
Libertad	2
2 de Mayo	0
Deportivo Santaní	1
Nacional (p)	0 (4)
Sportivo Luqueño	0 (3)
Martín Ledesma	1
Rubio Ñu	0

Quarter-finals
Sportivo Ameliano	0
Sportivo Trinidense	1
Guaraní	2
Deportivo Recoleta	0
Libertad	3
Deportivo Santaní	0
Nacional	2
Martín Ledesma	0

Semi-finals
Sportivo Trinidense	2
Guaraní	0
Libertad	3
Nacional	1

Final
Sportivo Trinidense	1 (1)
Libertad (p)	1 (4)
Third place play-off
Guaraní	1 (6)
Nacional (p)	1 (7)

== Third stage ==
The schedule for the first third stage matches was announced by the APF on 5 July 2023. Matches in this round were played from 11 July to 16 August 2023.

11 July 2023	Fernando de la Mora	1–2	Tacuary	Asunción
18:30 UTC−4	Fleitas 78'	Report	Martínez 12'; Recalde 31'	Stadium: Jardines del Kelito; Referee: Gedidías Zacarías

12 July 2023	Atyrá	1–1 (5–4 p)	Sportivo Carapeguá	Carapeguá
14:00 UTC−4	L. Fernández 44'	Report	Montiel 4'	Stadium: Municipal; Referee: José Armoa
	Penalties
	L. Fernández (penalty scored); Araújo (penalty scored); Asagidigbi (penalty scored); V. Fernández (penalty scored); Borisov (penalty scored)		(penalty missed) Vera; (penalty scored) Argüello; (penalty scored) Méndez; (penalty scored) Torales; (penalty scored) Báez

13 July 2023	Oriental	0–6	Sportivo Luqueño	Luque
17:30 UTC−4		Report	Speratti 1' (o.g.); Pérez 16'; Charpentier 47' (pen.); Castro 63', 73'; Aguilar 68'	Stadium: Feliciano Cáceres; Referee: Sergio Melgarejo

18 July 2023	Rubio Ñu	2–1	Atlético Amambay	San Estanislao
14:30 UTC−4	Argüello 72'; Achampeong 83'	Report	Pereira 76'	Stadium: La Catedral; Referee: Zulma Quiñónez

19 July 2023	Independiente (CG)	0–3	Sportivo Ameliano	Asunción
16:00 UTC−4		Report	Vega 15'; Bareiro 70', 90'	Stadium: Ricardo Gregor; Referee: Marco Franco

19 July 2023	San Lorenzo	0–0 (7–6 p)	Olimpia	Asunción
18:30 UTC−4		Report		Stadium: Manuel Ferreira; Referee: Blas Romero
	Penalties
	Urán (penalty scored); Rivarola (penalty scored); Zelaya (penalty scored); Duré (penalty missed); V. González (penalty scored); H. González (penalty scored); Galeano (penalty scored); Benítez (penalty scored)		(penalty scored) Silva; (penalty missed) Zabala; (penalty scored) Bruera; (penalty scored) Cardozo; (penalty scored) Ortiz; (penalty scored) W. González; (penalty scored) Barreto; (penalty missed) Romero

20 July 2023	3 de Noviembre	0–3	Guaireña	Villarrica
15:00 UTC−4		Report	Cazal 5', 22'; Franco 88'	Stadium: Parque del Guairá; Referee: Álvaro Giménez

20 July 2023	Cristóbal Colón (JAS)	0–2	Nacional	Asunción
17:30 UTC−4		Report	Báez 54'; Núñez 86'	Stadium: Arsenio Erico; Referee: Aldo Quiñónez

26 July 2023	2 de Mayo	2–0	Resistencia	Asunción
16:00 UTC−4	Bogado 32'; Cáceres 77'	Report		Stadium: Ricardo Gregor; Referee: Gedidías Zacarías

2 August 2023	Deportivo Recoleta	4–0	Atlético Colegiales	Luque
14:30 UTC−4	Salcedo 20', 36'; Murillo 86'; Bareiro 87'	Report		Stadium: Centro de Alto Rendimiento de Divisiones Formativas; Referee: Aldo Quiñónez

2 August 2023	24 de Setiembre (VP)	1–1 (4–5 p)	Cerro Porteño	Asunción
20:00 UTC−4	Meza 68' (pen.)	Report	Giménez 3'	Stadium: General Pablo Rojas; Referee: Derlis Benítez
	Penalties
	Meza (penalty scored); Aldama (penalty missed); Miño (penalty scored); Maciel (penalty scored); Caballero (penalty scored)		(penalty scored) Arzamendia; (penalty scored) Carrascal; (penalty scored) Morel; (penalty scored) Oviedo; (penalty scored) Brock

9 August 2023	Silvio Pettirossi	0–0 (2–4 p)	Martín Ledesma	Capiatá
14:30 UTC−4		Report		Stadium: Enrique Soler; Referee: Nelson Palma
	Penalties
	Duarte (penalty scored); Godoy (penalty scored); Moreira (penalty missed); Mendoza (penalty missed)		(penalty scored) Balbuena; (penalty scored) Villamayor; (penalty scored) Paniagua; (penalty scored) Cáceres

10 August 2023	3 de Febrero (CDE)	0–1	Sportivo Trinidense	Juan León Mallorquín
15:00 UTC−4		Report	Maná 14'	Stadium: Ka'arendy; Referee: Zulma Quiñónez

10 August 2023	Deportivo Santaní	1–0	General Caballero (JLM)	Juan León Mallorquín
17:30 UTC−4	Zárate 10'	Report		Stadium: Ka'arendy; Referee: Gedidías Zacarías

16 August 2023	Valois Rivarola	0–14	Guaraní	Asunción
16:00 UTC−4		Report	M. Benítez 2', 25'; Barceló 6', 51', 57'; Ríos 34'; Prieto 45'; Martínez 63'; Céspedes 69'; Pereira 75', 84', 85', 89'; Rivarola 78'	Stadium: Rogelio Livieres; Referee: Álvaro Giménez

16 August 2023	Sol de América	0–3	Libertad	Asunción
18:30 UTC−4		Report	Fernández 9'; Lezcano 21'; Merlini 66'	Stadium: Tigo La Huerta; Referee: Blas Romero

== Round of 16 ==
The schedule for the first round of 16 matches was announced by the APF on 14 September 2023. Matches in this round were played from 19 to 28 September 2023.

19 September 2023	Nacional	0–0 (4–3 p)	Sportivo Luqueño	Villa Elisa
17:00 UTC−4		Report		Stadium: Luis Alfonso Giagni; Referee: David Ojeda
	Penalties
	Santacruz (penalty scored); Román (penalty scored); Espínola (penalty missed); Alfaro (penalty scored); Núñez (penalty scored)		(penalty scored) Fernández; (penalty scored) Charpentier; (penalty scored) Vera; (penalty missed) Ruiz Díaz; (penalty missed) Aguilar

19 September 2023	Tacuary	1–2	Sportivo Trinidense	Villa Elisa
19:30 UTC−4	Núñez 55'	Report	Delvalle 31', 60'	Stadium: Luis Alfonso Giagni; Referee: Aldo Quiñónez

20 September 2023	San Lorenzo	1–2	Libertad	Asunción
17:00 UTC−4	Quintana 60'	Report	Ortíz 30' (o.g.); Fernández 81'	Stadium: Arsenio Erico; Referee: Derlis Benítez

21 September 2023	Deportivo Recoleta	2–2 (5–4 p)	Atyrá	Asunción
17:00 UTC−4	R. Ortiz 18'; Espínola 65'	Report	Arce 50'; Galeano 57'	Stadium: La Arboleda; Referee: Dionicio Cristaldo
	Penalties
	Ayala (penalty scored); R. Ortiz (penalty scored); A. González (penalty scored); Perruchino (penalty missed); Bareiro (penalty scored); Vidal (penalty scored)		(penalty scored) Fernández; (penalty scored) Araújo; (penalty missed) J. Maidana; (penalty scored) A. Maidana; (penalty scored) D. González; (penalty missed) Galeano

21 September 2023	Martín Ledesma	1–0	Rubio Ñu	Asunción
19:30 UTC−4	Burgos 54'	Report		Stadium: La Arboleda; Referee: Álvaro Giménez

26 September 2023	2 de Mayo	0–1	Deportivo Santaní	Pedro Juan Caballero
19:30 UTC−4		Report	Oviedo 19'	Stadium: Río Parapití; Referee: Blas Romero

27 September 2023	Cerro Porteño	1–3	Sportivo Ameliano	Villa Elisa
17:00 UTC−4	Bobadilla 9'	Report	Cabrera 29'; Torales 70', 73'	Stadium: Luis Alfonso Giagni; Referee: Giancarlos Juliadoza

28 September 2023	Guaraní	2–0	Guaireña	Asunción
19:30 UTC−4	Barceló 53' (pen.); R. Benítez 72'	Report		Stadium: Rogelio Livieres; Referee: Derlis Benítez

== Quarter-finals ==
The schedule for the quarter-final matches was confirmed by the APF on 6 October 2023. Matches in this round were played from 11 to 26 October 2023.

11 October 2023	Nacional	2–0	Martín Ledesma	Asunción
19:30 UTC−3	Aguilar 2', 12'	Report		Stadium: Rogelio Livieres; Referee: Derlis Benítez

14 October 2023	Sportivo Ameliano	0–1	Sportivo Trinidense	Villa Elisa
18:00 UTC−3		Report	Ayala 9'	Stadium: Luis Alfonso Giagni; Referee: David Ojeda

14 October 2023	Guaraní	2–0	Deportivo Recoleta	Villa Elisa
20:30 UTC−3	Camacho 45' (pen.); Amarilla 57'	Report		Stadium: Luis Alfonso Giagni; Referee: Aldo Quiñónez

26 October 2023	Libertad	3–0	Deportivo Santaní	Villa Elisa
19:30 UTC−3	Fernández 33'; Lezcano 61'; Mendieta 75'	Report		Stadium: Luis Alfonso Giagni; Referee: Derlis Benítez

== Semi-finals ==
The schedule for the semi-final matches was confirmed by the APF on 30 October 2023. Matches in this round were played on 8 and 9 November 2023.

8 November 2023	Sportivo Trinidense	2–0	Guaraní	Asunción
19:30 UTC−3	M. Riveros 33' (pen.); Delvalle 73'	Report		Stadium: Arsenio Erico; Referee: Carlos Paul Benítez

9 November 2023	Libertad	3–1	Nacional	Asunción
19:30 UTC−3	Caballero 48'; Espinoza 82'; Cardozo 90' (pen.)	Report	Román 43'	Stadium: Manuel Ferreira; Referee: Juan Gabriel Benítez

== Third place play-off ==
19 November 2023
19:30 UTC−3

Guaraní	1–1	Nacional
Rivarola 44'	Report	Gaona 48'
Penalties
Santander (penalty scored); Sarquis (penalty scored); G. Vargas (penalty scored); Amarilla (penalty scored); Camacho (penalty missed); Pérez (penalty scored); Fernández (penalty scored); Moya (penalty missed); Ramírez (penalty missed)	6–7	(penalty scored) Orzuza; (penalty missed) Benegas; (penalty scored) Velazco; (penalty scored) Alfaro; (penalty scored) J. Núñez; (penalty scored) S. Vargas; (penalty scored) Aguilar; (penalty missed) Brizuela; (penalty scored) C. Núñez

Estadio Luis Alfonso Giagni, Villa Elisa
Referee: Marco Franco

== Final ==
On 23 October 2023, the APF announced that the final would be played at Estadio Parque del Guairá in Villarrica. The match, originally scheduled for 29 November 2023, was later rescheduled to 2 December 2023 due to adverse weather conditions.

2 December 2023
19:30 UTC−3

Sportivo Trinidense	1–1	Libertad
Álvarez 90+4'	Report	Barboza 51'
Penalties
Arce (penalty missed); Mendoza (penalty missed); Benítez (penalty scored)	1–4	(penalty scored) Mendieta; (penalty scored) Barboza; (penalty scored) Viera; (penalty scored) Espinoza

Estadio Parque del Guairá, Villarrica
Referee: Juan Benítez

== See also ==
- 2023 Paraguayan Primera División season
- 2023 Paraguayan División Intermedia
