= 2023 APF División Intermedia =

División Intermedia
- Season: 2023
- Dates: 31 March – 9 October 2023
- Champions: Sol de América (4th title)
- Promoted: Sol de América; 2 de Mayo
- Relegated: Atyrá; 24 de Setiembre (VP); 12 de Octubre
- Matches: 240
- Goals: 634 (2.64 per match)
- Top goalscorer: Aldo González (14 goals)
- Biggest home win: Dep. Recoleta 7–1 Sol de América (23 April); Spvo. Carapeguá 6–0 Dep. Santaní (17 September); Sol de América 6–0 12 de Octubre (6 October)
- Biggest away win: Atyrá 0–5 Pastoreo (15 April); 24 de Setiembre 0–5 Independiente (1 October)
- Highest scoring: Dep. Recoleta 3–7 2 de Mayo (5 May)

The 2023 División Intermedia season, named "Homenaje a Don Alejandro Dos Santos", was the 105th season of the second-tier league of Paraguayan football and 26th under the División Intermedia name. The season began on 31 March and ended on 9 October 2023, and the fixtures for the season were announced on 14 December 2022.

Sol de América won their fourth title in the competition, securing the championship with two rounds to go after a 2–1 victory over Martín Ledesma on 25 September. The other promoted team was 2 de Mayo, who clinched their promotion two rounds prior to the end of the season with a 1–1 draw with 3 de Febrero on 23 September.

== Format ==
16 teams took part in the competition, which was played under a double round-robin system with teams playing each other twice, once at home and once away for a total of 30 matches. The top two teams at the end of the season were promoted to the Paraguayan Primera División for the 2024 season, while the bottom three teams in the relegation table at the end of the season were relegated: teams located within 50 kilometres of Asunción are relegated to Primera División B, while teams from outside Greater Asunción and the Central Department are relegated to Primera División B Nacional.

== Teams ==
=== Team changes ===
16 teams competed in the season: 11 teams from the previous División Intermedia season plus the two teams relegated from Primera División in its 2022 season (Sol de América and 12 de Octubre), the top two teams from the 2022 Primera División B (Deportivo Recoleta and 24 de Setiembre (VP)) and the 2022 Primera División B Nacional champions Sportivo Carapeguá. Sportivo Trinidense and Sportivo Luqueño did not compete since they earned promotion to Primera División at the end of the previous season, nor did Guaraní (T), Sportivo Iteño, and River Plate, who were relegated at the end of the 2022 season by finishing in the bottom three places of the relegation table.

Promoted from 2022 Tercera División	Relegated from 2022 Primera División	Promoted to 2023 Primera División	Relegated to 2023 Tercera División
24 de Setiembre (VP) (Primera B Metropolitana); Deportivo Recoleta (Primera B Metropolitana); Sportivo Carapeguá (Primera B Nacional)	12 de Octubre; Sol de América	Sportivo Luqueño; Sportivo Trinidense	Guaraní (T) (Primera B Nacional); River Plate (Primera B Metropolitana); Sportivo Iteño (Primera B Metropolitana)

=== Stadia and locations ===
Locations of the 2023 División Intermedia teams

Team	City	Stadium	Capacity
2 de Mayo	Pedro Juan Caballero	Río Parapití	25,000
3 de Febrero	Ciudad del Este	Antonio Aranda	23,500
12 de Octubre	Itauguá	Luis Alberto Salinas	10,000
24 de Setiembre (VP)	Areguá	Próculo Cortázar	2,500
Atlético Colegiales	Lambaré	Luciano Zacarías	4,500
Atyrá	Atyrá	San Francisco de Asís	10,000
Deportivo Recoleta	Asunción	CARDIF	1,800
Deportivo Santaní	San Estanislao	Juan José Vázquez	8,000
Fernando de la Mora	Asunción	Emiliano Ghezzi	6,000
Independiente (CG)	Asunción	Ricardo Gregor	4,000
Martín Ledesma	Capiatá	Enrique Soler	5,000
Pastoreo	Juan Manuel Frutos	Complejo Municipal Campo 9	5,000
Rubio Ñu	Asunción	La Arboleda	8,000
San Lorenzo	San Lorenzo	Gunther Vogel	5,000
Sol de América	Villa Elisa	Luis Alfonso Giagni	11,000
Sportivo Carapeguá	Carapeguá	Municipal de Carapeguá	10,000

== Standings ==
Pos	Team	Pld	W	D	L	GF	GA	GD	Pts	Qualification
1	Sol de América (C, P)	30	21	4	5	46	25	+21	67	Promotion to Primera División
2	2 de Mayo (P)	30	16	9	5	46	23	+23	57	Promotion to Primera División
3	Independiente (CG)	30	14	9	7	53	35	+18	51	
4	Deportivo Recoleta	30	15	6	9	59	45	+14	51	
5	Fernando de la Mora	30	14	6	10	40	31	+9	48	
6	Rubio Ñu	30	12	8	10	42	44	−2	44	
7	Deportivo Santaní	30	12	8	10	41	43	−2	44	
8	Sportivo Carapeguá	30	11	10	9	43	31	+12	43	
9	Pastoreo	30	11	10	9	37	31	+6	43	
10	San Lorenzo	30	11	9	10	35	27	+8	42	
11	3 de Febrero	30	11	6	13	39	42	−3	39	
12	Atlético Colegiales	30	9	5	16	29	44	−15	32	
13	Martín Ledesma	30	8	7	15	30	41	−11	31	
14	24 de Setiembre (VP)	30	7	8	15	38	52	−14	29	
15	Atyrá	30	7	5	18	32	58	−26	26	
16	12 de Octubre	30	2	8	20	24	62	−38	14	

Source: APF, Soccerway
Rules for classification: 1) Points, 2) Head-to-head points, 3) Head-to-head goal difference, 4) Overall goal difference, 5) Goals for, 6) Playoff game (if needed to decide championship between two teams) or Drawing of lots (if three teams or more are tied).
(C) Champions; (P) Promoted

== Results ==
Home \ Away	2DM	3FE	12O	24S	CAC	ATY	REC	SAN	FDM	IND	MAL	PAS	RUB	SSL	SOL	SPC
2 de Mayo	—	1–0	1–0	0–0	2–0	1–1	1–1	3–2	0–0	4–0	1–0	2–0	2–0	2–1	1–1	2–0
3 de Febrero	1–1	—	3–0	3–0	3–1	2–0	2–0	2–3	0–2	2–0	2–1	2–1	1–2	0–2	0–1	1–3
12 de Octubre	1–2	1–2	—	1–0	0–3	3–0	1–4	2–3	0–0	2–3	0–0	1–1	0–2	0–2	0–2	2–3
24 de Setiembre (VP)	2–1	1–2	1–1	—	2–3	5–0	1–1	0–1	4–2	0–5	2–1	1–1	0–1	1–1	0–2	3–3
Atlético Colegiales	1–3	1–0	2–0	3–2	—	2–1	1–3	1–0	1–0	0–1	0–3	0–1	1–1	0–1	0–1	0–4
Atyrá	1–0	1–1	1–0	0–0	1–1	—	2–3	2–0	0–2	2–4	0–1	0–5	3–1	2–3	1–2	2–1
Deportivo Recoleta	3–7	6–1	4–1	0–0	0–3	4–2	—	2–1	3–3	2–0	2–1	0–0	1–3	2–1	7–1	0–0
Deportivo Santaní	2–2	1–1	2–2	0–1	3–1	1–0	2–1	—	2–1	1–0	0–0	0–2	0–1	2–2	2–1	3–1
Fernando de la Mora	1–0	2–1	5–1	1–2	2–1	2–0	1–0	3–2	—	0–3	1–0	2–0	1–1	1–0	0–2	0–1
Independiente (CG)	0–0	1–1	2–2	2–1	2–1	3–0	2–0	2–2	2–1	—	1–2	1–1	2–2	0–1	2–2	1–1
Martín Ledesma	2–1	3–3	1–1	2–1	0–0	0–2	1–2	1–0	0–3	0–4	—	4–2	3–1	1–1	0–1	0–0
Pastoreo	0–1	0–0	1–0	4–2	2–1	2–0	0–1	1–1	1–1	0–3	3–1	—	1–1	0–0	0–1	3–1
Rubio Ñu	1–3	3–1	2–1	5–4	0–0	2–3	0–2	2–2	1–0	2–2	3–1	2–2	—	0–3	1–2	1–0
San Lorenzo	0–1	1–0	1–1	1–2	4–0	2–2	3–1	0–2	1–2	0–2	1–0	0–1	2–0	—	0–1	0–0
Sol de América	2–1	2–0	6–0	3–0	2–1	2–1	1–0	0–1	1–0	1–3	2–1	1–0	1–0	1–1	—	1–1
Sportivo Carapeguá	0–0	1–2	3–0	2–0	0–0	3–2	3–4	6–0	1–1	2–0	1–0	1–2	0–1	0–0	1–0	—

Source: Soccerway
Legend: Blue = home team win; Yellow = draw; Red = away team win.

== Top scorers ==
Rank	Name	Club	Goals
1	(Paraguay) Aldo González	Deportivo Recoleta	14
2	(Argentina) Franco Aragón	Sol de América	12
3	(Paraguay) Derlis Ortiz	Deportivo Recoleta	11
4	(Paraguay) Fernando Matías Cáceres	2 de Mayo	10
4	(Paraguay) Sergio Dietze	Independiente (CG)	10
4	(Paraguay) Osvaldo Argüello	Rubio Ñu	10
4	(Paraguay) Ronald Acuña	Deportivo Santaní	10
4	(Paraguay) Edsson Riveros	Rubio Ñu	10
9	(Paraguay) Wilfrido Báez	Independiente (CG)	9
9	(Paraguay) Lucas González	Deportivo Recoleta	9
9	(Paraguay) Roque Guachiré	Fernando de la Mora	9
9	(Paraguay) Maicol Fernández	3 de Febrero	9

Source: APF

== Relegation ==
Relegation is determined at the end of the season by computing an average of the number of points earned per game over the past three seasons. The three teams with the lowest average were relegated to Primera División B or Primera División B Nacional for the following season, depending on their geographical location.

Pos	Team	2021 Pts	2022 Pts	2023 Pts	Total Pts	Total Pld	Avg	Relegation
1	Sol de América	—	—	67	67	30	2.233	
2	Deportivo Recoleta	—	—	51	51	30	1.7	
3	Pastoreo	—	53	43	96	60	1.6	
4	San Lorenzo	53	54	42	149	94	1.585	
5	Independiente (CG)	51	41	51	143	94	1.521	
6	Fernando de la Mora	45	48	48	141	94	1.5	
7	Sportivo Carapeguá	—	—	43	43	30	1.433	
8	Rubio Ñu	39	44	44	127	94	1.351	
9	2 de Mayo	36	29	57	122	94	1.298	
10	3 de Febrero	48	35	39	122	94	1.298	
11	Martín Ledesma	—	45	31	76	60	1.267	
12	Deportivo Santaní	41	33	44	118	94	1.255	
13	Atlético Colegiales	—	36	32	68	60	1.133	
14	Atyrá (R)	43	36	26	105	94	1.117	Relegation to Primera B Nacional
15	24 de Setiembre (VP) (R)	—	—	29	29	30	0.967	Relegation to Primera B Metropolitana
16	12 de Octubre (R)	—	—	14	14	30	0.467	Relegation to Primera B Metropolitana

Source: APF

== See also ==
- 2023 Paraguayan Primera División season
- 2023 Copa Paraguay
