= 2022 APF División Intermedia =

División Intermedia
- Season: 2022
- Dates: 1 April – 11 October 2022
- Champions: Sportivo Trinidense (2nd title)
- Promoted: Sportivo Trinidense; Sportivo Luqueño
- Relegated: Guaraní (T); Sportivo Iteño; River Plate
- Matches: 239
- Goals: 564 (2.36 per match)
- Top goalscorer: Diego Fernández (12 goals)
- Biggest home win: Pastoreo 4–0 Deportivo Santaní (31 July); Fdo. de la Mora 5–1 Atl. Colegiales (20 August)
- Biggest away win: Sportivo Iteño 0–6 Fdo. de la Mora (9 October)
- Highest scoring: Independiente (CG) 5–2 Martín Ledesma (22 April); San Lorenzo 5–2 Sportivo Iteño (3 September)

The 2022 División Intermedia season, named "Homenaje al Doctor Luis Lezcano Pastore y al Escribano Julio César Ortiz Duarte", was the 104th season of the second-tier league of Paraguayan football and 25th under the Paraguayan División Intermedia name. The season began on 1 April and ended on 11 October 2022. The fixtures for the season were announced on 15 December 2021.

Sportivo Trinidense and Sportivo Luqueño ensured their promotion to the Paraguayan Primera División with two matches in hand; the former by drawing 1–1 with 2 de Mayo at home on 25 September 2022, while the latter clinched promotion with a 1–0 victory against Atlético Colegiales coupled with a 2–0 loss for Pastoreo against Fernando de la Mora the following day. Sportivo Trinidense ended up clinching the tournament's title the following weekend, with a win over Atlético Colegiales and a loss for Sportivo Luqueño against San Lorenzo.

== Format ==
16 teams took part in the competition, which was played under a double round-robin system with teams playing each other twice, once at home and once away for a total of 30 matches. The top two teams at the end of the season were promoted to the Paraguayan Primera División for the 2023 season, while the bottom three teams in the relegation table at the end of the season were relegated: teams located within 50 kilometres of Asunción were relegated to Primera División B, while teams from outside Greater Asunción and the Central Department were relegated to Primera División B Nacional.

== Teams ==
16 teams competed in the season: 11 teams from the previous División Intermedia season plus the two teams relegated from Primera División in its 2021 season (River Plate and Sportivo Luqueño), the top two teams from the 2021 Primera División B (Atlético Colegiales and Martín Ledesma) and the 2019–20 Campeonato Nacional de Interligas champions Pastoreo.

=== Stadia and locations ===
Locations of the 2022 División Intermedia teams

| Team | City | Stadium | Capacity |
|---|---|---|---|
| 2 de Mayo | Pedro Juan Caballero | Río Parapití | 25,000 |
| 3 de Febrero | Ciudad del Este | Antonio Aranda | 23,500 |
| Atlético Colegiales | Lambaré | Luciano Zacarías | 4,500 |
| Atyrá | Atyrá | San Francisco de Asís | 10,000 |
| Deportivo Santaní | San Estanislao | Juan José Vázquez | 8,000 |
| Fernando de la Mora | Asunción | Emiliano Ghezzi | 6,000 |
| Guaraní (T) | Trinidad | Carlos Memmel | 5,000 |
| Independiente (CG) | Asunción | Ricardo Gregor | 4,000 |
| Martín Ledesma | Capiatá | Enrique Soler | 5,000 |
| Pastoreo | Juan Manuel Frutos | Complejo Municipal Campo 9 | 5,000 |
| River Plate | Asunción | Jardines del Kelito | 6,500 |
| Rubio Ñu | Asunción | La Arboleda | 8,000 |
| San Lorenzo | San Lorenzo | Gunther Vogel | 5,000 |
| Sportivo Iteño | Itá | Salvador Morga | 4,500 |
| Sportivo Luqueño | Luque | Feliciano Cáceres | 23,000 |
| Sportivo Trinidense | Asunción | Martín Torres | 3,000 |

== Standings ==
| Pos | Team | Pld | W | D | L | GF | GA | GD | Pts | Qualification |
|---|---|---|---|---|---|---|---|---|---|---|
| 1 | Sportivo Trinidense (C, P) | 30 | 19 | 9 | 2 | 54 | 24 | +30 | 66 | Promotion to Primera División |
| 2 | Sportivo Luqueño (P) | 30 | 18 | 7 | 5 | 42 | 26 | +16 | 61 | Promotion to Primera División |
| 3 | San Lorenzo | 30 | 16 | 6 | 8 | 47 | 26 | +21 | 54 | |
| 4 | Pastoreo | 30 | 14 | 11 | 5 | 44 | 28 | +16 | 53 | |
| 5 | Fernando de la Mora | 30 | 13 | 9 | 8 | 48 | 31 | +17 | 48 | |
| 6 | Martín Ledesma | 30 | 12 | 9 | 9 | 30 | 29 | +1 | 45 | |
| 7 | Rubio Ñu | 30 | 12 | 8 | 10 | 39 | 30 | +9 | 44 | |
| 8 | Independiente (CG) | 30 | 11 | 8 | 11 | 33 | 36 | −3 | 41 | |
| 9 | Atyrá | 30 | 10 | 6 | 14 | 24 | 28 | −4 | 36 | |
| 10 | Atlético Colegiales | 30 | 10 | 6 | 14 | 32 | 42 | −10 | 36 | |
| 11 | 3 de Febrero | 30 | 8 | 11 | 11 | 29 | 36 | −7 | 35 | |
| 12 | Deportivo Santaní | 30 | 9 | 6 | 15 | 30 | 42 | −12 | 33 | |
| 13 | Guaraní (T) | 30 | 8 | 7 | 15 | 29 | 41 | −12 | 31 | |
| 14 | 2 de Mayo | 30 | 7 | 8 | 15 | 32 | 39 | −7 | 29 | |
| 15 | River Plate | 30 | 7 | 5 | 18 | 27 | 39 | −12 | 26 | |
| 16 | Sportivo Iteño | 30 | 4 | 8 | 18 | 27 | 70 | −43 | 20 | |

Source: APF, Soccerway
Rules for classification: 1) Points, 2) Playoff game (only if needed to decide championship or promotion between two teams), 3) Goal difference, 4) Goals for, 5) Away goals for, 6) Drawing of lots.
(C) Champions; (P) Promoted

== Results ==
| Home \ Away | 2DM | 3FE | CAC | ATY | SAN | FDM | GUA | IND | MAL | PAS | RIV | RUB | SSL | SPI | SLU | TRI |
|---|---|---|---|---|---|---|---|---|---|---|---|---|---|---|---|---|
| 2 de Mayo | — | 0–3 | 3–0 | 0–2 | 1–2 | 3–0 | 1–0 | 1–2 | 0–0 | 2–2 | 1–2 | 2–2 | 0–2 | 3–1 | 3–0 | 2–3 |
| 3 de Febrero | 0–0 | — | 1–3 | 0–2 | 2–0 | 2–1 | 0–1 | 2–3 | 1–1 | 1–1 | 0–1 | 0–0 | 2–1 | 2–0 | 2–4 | 1–1 |
| Atlético Colegiales | 2–2 | 1–1 | — | 0–0 | 0–0 | 1–3 | 1–3 | 3–0 | 0–1 | 1–0 | 1–0 | 2–1 | 0–1 | 1–2 | 1–0 | 0–1 |
| Atyrá | 0–1 | 1–2 | 2–1 | — | 0–2 | 0–1 | 0–0 | 0–0 | 2–0 | 1–2 | 1–0 | 0–2 | 1–0 | 2–0 | 0–1 | 0–0 |
| Deportivo Santaní | 3–1 | 1–1 | 0–1 | 2–3 | — | 2–2 | 2–4 | 0–1 | 0–1 | 0–2 | 3–0 | 0–4 | 1–0 | 0–1 | 0–1 | 2–2 |
| Fernando de la Mora | 2–1 | 3–0 | 5–1 | 0–0 | 0–1 | — | 3–1 | 3–1 | 0–0 | 2–0 | 0–0 | 0–2 | 0–2 | 4–1 | 0–0 | 0–2 |
| Guaraní (T) | 1–0 | 1–1 | 0–0 | 2–1 | 0–2 | 1–2 | — | 2–1 | 2–1 | 1–2 | 1–1 | 0–2 | 0–1 | 1–1 | 0–2 | 1–2 |
| Independiente (CG) | 1–0 | 2–0 | 0–3 (Note: Match suspended and awarded to Atlético Colegiales by walkover since Independiente (CG) failed to provide an ambulance.) | 1–2 | 2–0 | 2–2 | 1–1 | — | 5–2 | 1–1 | 1–0 | 2–1 | 1–1 | 1–0 | 0–1 | 1–1 |
| Martín Ledesma | 2–1 | 1–1 | 2–0 | 1–0 | 0–2 | 1–1 | 1–0 | 0–0 | — | 0–0 | 3–2 | 0–2 | 3–0 | 3–0 | 0–1 | 0–2 |
| Pastoreo | 1–0 | 1–0 | 2–1 | 2–1 | 4–0 | 1–4 | 1–1 | 0–0 | 1–0 | — | 1–0 | 0–0 | 1–1 | 1–2 | 1–1 | 1–3 |
| River Plate | 0–1 | 0–1 | 1–2 | 0–1 | 2–0 | 1–1 | 1–2 | 2–0 | 0–1 | 1–2 | — | 0–2 | 1–1 | 4–1 | 1–2 | 0–4 |
| Rubio Ñu | 1–1 | 1–1 | 1–2 | 1–0 | 2–2 | 0–0 | 3–1 | 1–0 | 0–1 | 0–4 | 0–1 | — | 2–1 | 2–0 | 0–1 | 0–2 |
| San Lorenzo | 1–0 | 3–0 | 4–1 | 3–0 | 1–0 | 1–3 | 2–0 | 2–0 | 1–1 | 1–2 | 0–0 | 4–1 | — | 5–2 | 2–0 | 3–0 |
| Sportivo Iteño | 1–1 | 0–1 | 3–3 | 1–1 | 0–1 | 0–6 | 3–1 | 0–2 | 1–1 | 0–5 | 1–4 | 1–5 | 1–1 | — | 0–0 | 1–3 |
| Sportivo Luqueño | 2–0 | 1–0 | 1–0 | 2–1 | 2–2 | 2–0 | 2–1 | 3–1 | 1–2 | 1–1 | 2–1 | 2–1 | 1–2 | 2–2 | — | 0–0 |
| Sportivo Trinidense | 1–1 | 1–1 | 2–0 | 1–0 | 2–0 | 2–0 | 1–0 | 2–1 | 3–1 | 2–2 | 3–1 | 0–0 | 2–0 | 4–1 | 2–4 | — |

Source: APF, Soccerway
Legend: Blue = home team win; Yellow = draw; Red = away team win.

== Top scorers ==
| Rank | Name | Club | Goals |
|---|---|---|---|
| 1 | (Paraguay) Diego Fernández | Sportivo Luqueño | 12 |
| 2 | (Paraguay) Emmanuel Morales | Rubio Ñu | 10 |
| 3 | (Paraguay) Ariel Roa | Fernando de la Mora | 9 |
| 3 | (Paraguay) Renzo Carballo | Pastoreo | 9 |
| 3 | (Paraguay) Rodrigo Arévalo | 3 de Febrero / Sportivo Trinidense | 9 |
| 6 | (Paraguay) Juan Isidro Núñez | Sportivo Luqueño | 8 |
| 6 | (Paraguay) Marcelo Ferreira | Independiente (CG) | 8 |
| 6 | (Paraguay) Jorge Quintana | San Lorenzo | 8 |
| 6 | (Paraguay) Juan Marcelo Villamayor | San Lorenzo | 8 |
| 6 | (Paraguay) Óscar Giménez | Sportivo Trinidense | 8 |

Source: APF

== Relegation ==
Relegation was determined at the end of the season by computing an average of the number of points earned per game over the past three seasons. The three teams with the lowest average were relegated to Primera División B or Primera División B Nacional for the following season, depending on their geographical location.

| Pos | Team | 2019 Pts | 2021 Pts | 2022 Pts | Total Pts | Total Pld | Avg | Relegation |
|---|---|---|---|---|---|---|---|---|
| 1 | Sportivo Luqueño | — | — | 61 | 61 | 30 | 2.033 | |
| 2 | Pastoreo | — | — | 53 | 53 | 30 | 1.767 | |
| 3 | Sportivo Trinidense | 40 | 52 | 66 | 158 | 94 | 1.681 | |
| 4 | San Lorenzo | — | 53 | 54 | 107 | 64 | 1.672 | |
| 5 | Martín Ledesma | — | — | 46 | 46 | 30 | 1.533 | |
| 6 | Fernando de la Mora | 43 | 45 | 48 | 136 | 94 | 1.447 | |
| 7 | Independiente (CG) | 41 | 51 | 41 | 133 | 94 | 1.415 | |
| 8 | Atyrá | 49 | 43 | 36 | 128 | 94 | 1.362 | |
| 9 | 3 de Febrero | 39 | 48 | 35 | 122 | 94 | 1.298 | |
| 10 | 2 de Mayo | 55 | 36 | 29 | 120 | 94 | 1.277 | |
| 11 | Rubio Ñu | 35 | 39 | 44 | 118 | 94 | 1.255 | |
| 12 | Atlético Colegiales | — | — | 36 | 36 | 30 | 1.2 | |
| 13 | Deportivo Santaní | — | 41 | 33 | 74 | 64 | 1.156 | |
| 14 | Guaraní (T) (R) | — | 41 | 31 | 72 | 64 | 1.125 | Relegation to Primera División B Nacional |
| 15 | Sportivo Iteño (R) | 36 | 39 | 20 | 95 | 94 | 1.011 | Relegation to Primera División B Metropolitana |
| 16 | River Plate (R) | — | — | 26 | 26 | 30 | 0.867 | Relegation to Primera División B Metropolitana |

Source: APF

== See also ==
- 2022 Paraguayan Primera División season
- 2022 Copa Paraguay
