= Rodrigo Resquín =

Paraguayan footballer (born 1989)

Personal information
- Full name: Rodrigo Raúl Resquín Jara
- Date of birth: 23 August 1989 (age 37)
- Place of birth: Capiatá, Paraguay
- Height: 1.79 m (5 ft 10 in)
- Position: Midfielder

Team information
- Current team: Cristóbal Colón JAS

Youth career
- Deportivo Capiatá

Senior career*
Years	Team	Apps	(Gls)
2011	Guabirá		
2012–2013	Deportivo Capiatá	18	(0)
2014	Olimpia	3	(0)
2014	Santiago Morning	12	(0)
2015	Sportivo Carapeguá		
2015	Deportivo Liberación		
2016	River Plate Asunción	3	(0)
2016	Deportivo Liberación		
2017	Martín Ledesma		
2018	Resistencia	8	(0)
2018–2019	Guaireña		
2020	Fulgencio Yegros	0	(0)
2021	Rubio Ñu		
2021	AO Trikala	9	(1)
2022	Deportivo Santaní		
2022–2023	Atyrá	25	(0)
2024–	Cristóbal Colón JAS		
- * Club domestic league appearances and goals as of 6 August 2024

Rodrigo Raúl Resquín Jara (born 23 August 1989) is a Paraguayan professional footballer who plays as a midfielder for Cristóbal Colón JAS.

== Career ==
In 2011, Resquìn formed part of Bolivian side Guabirá.

In 2012, Resquín achieved promotion with Deportivo Capiatá from the División Intermedia to the Primera División for the 2013 season. Later, Resquin was ignored by the club and then formed part of a group of players which trained with Edgar Denis, which played in a friendly against Olimpia Asunción. Concluding the friendly, Olimpia Asunción coach Ever Hugo Almeida chose Resquin to train with the club.

Three days after signing with Olimpia in 2013, Resquin started in a game against Tacuary at the Estadio Manuel Ferreira.

Resquin played for Chile’s Primera B club Santiago Morning as midfielder. In October 2014, Resquin was substituted into a game in the 87th minute in a 0–0 away draw against Deportes La Serena.

In March 2015, Resquin was incorporated as a new signing to Sportivo Carapeguá for the División Intermedia season.

In 2017, Resquín played for Club General Martin Ledesma in the División Intermedia.

In 2018, Resquin formed part of Resistencia's squad for the División Intermedia season.

In 2018–19, Resquín played for Guaireña, winning the División Intermedia and getting promotion to the Paraguayan top level.

The next year, he joined Fulgencio Yegros, but the Paraguayan football was suspended in the context of the COVID-19 pandemic. In 2021, he switched to Rubio Ñu for the División Intermedia season.

In 2024, Resquín signed with Cristóbal Colón JAS in the Paraguayan Primera División B.
