= 2021 APF División Intermedia =

División Intermedia
- Season: 2021
- Dates: 9 April – 26 October 2021
- Champions: General Caballero (JLM) (1st title)
- Promoted: General Caballero (JLM); Resistencia; Tacuary; Sportivo Ameliano
- Relegated: Deportivo Capiatá; Fulgencio Yegros; General Díaz
- Copa Sudamericana: General Caballero (JLM)
- Matches: 306
- Goals: 752 (2.46 per match)
- Top goalscorer: Alex Arce (24 goals)
- Biggest home win: 2 de Mayo 4–0 Sportivo Trinidense (6 June); Sportivo Ameliano 4–0 Fulgencio Yegros (22 July); Resistencia 4–0 Sportivo Iteño (15 August); Guaraní (T) 4–0 Dep. Capiatá (22 August); Tacuary 5–1 2 de Mayo (28 August); San Lorenzo 5–1 Sportivo Trinidense (18 October); Tacuary 4–0 Rubio Ñu (26 October)
- Biggest away win: 2 de Mayo 1–8 San Lorenzo (26 October)
- Highest scoring: 2 de Mayo 1–8 San Lorenzo (26 October)

The 2021 División Intermedia season, named "Cincuentenario del Club Atlético 3 de Febrero y Homenaje al Lic. Miguel Ángel Cañete Alderete", was the 103rd season of the second-tier league of Paraguayan football and 24th under the Paraguayan División Intermedia name. The season began on 9 April and ended on 26 October 2021. The fixtures for the season were announced on 15 January 2021.

The competition returned after a one-year hiatus as the 2020 seasons of the lower-tier club tournaments of Paraguayan football were cancelled by the Paraguayan Football Association due to the COVID-19 pandemic.

General Caballero (JLM) won their first División Intermedia title with four matches to spare, following a 4–1 victory over Rubio Ñu on 27 September 2021.

== Format ==
18 teams took part in the competition, which was played under a double round-robin system with teams playing each other twice, once at home and once away for a total of 34 matches. The top three teams at the end of the season were promoted to the Paraguayan Primera División for the 2022 season, with the champions also qualifying for the 2022 Copa Sudamericana, while the fourth-placed team will play a play-off against the ninth-placed team of the Primera División relegation table for promotion to the top flight.

The bottom three teams in the relegation table at the end of the season were relegated: teams located within 50 kilometres of Asunción were relegated to Primera División B, while teams from outside Greater Asunción and the Central Department were relegated to Primera División B Nacional.

== Teams ==
18 teams competed in the season: 11 teams from the previous División Intermedia season plus the four teams relegated from Primera División in its 2019 and 2020 seasons (Deportivo Capiatá, Deportivo Santaní, General Díaz and San Lorenzo), the top two teams from the 2019 Primera División B (Sportivo Ameliano and Tacuary) and the 2019 Primera División B Nacional champions Guaraní from Trinidad.

Pastoreo F.C., who were entitled to enter this year's competition as 2019–20 Campeonato Nacional de Interligas champions, had their debut postponed to 2022 per decision by the APF's Executive Committee, since Guaraní de Trinidad already held the berth reserved to the Unión del Fútbol del Interior (UFI) for this season.

=== Stadia and locations ===
Locations of the 2021 División Intermedia teams

Team	City	Stadium	Capacity
2 de Mayo	Pedro Juan Caballero	Río Parapití	25,000
3 de Febrero	Ciudad del Este	Antonio Aranda	23,500
Atyrá	Atyrá	San Francisco de Asís	10,000
Deportivo Capiatá	Capiatá	Erico Galeano Segovia	15,000
Deportivo Santaní	San Estanislao	Juan José Vázquez	8,000
Fernando de la Mora	Asunción	Emiliano Ghezzi	6,000
Fulgencio Yegros	Ñemby	Parque Fulgencio Yegros	1,000
General Caballero (JLM)	Juan León Mallorquín	Ka'arendy	3,000
General Díaz	Luque	General Adrián Jara	4,000
Guaraní (T)	Trinidad	Los Fundadores	1,000
Independiente (CG)	Asunción	Ricardo Gregor	4,000
Resistencia	Asunción	Tomás Beggan Correa	3,500
Rubio Ñu	Asunción	La Arboleda	8,000
San Lorenzo	San Lorenzo	Gunther Vogel	5,000
Sportivo Ameliano	Asunción	José Tomás Silva (Note: Using Estadio Roque Battilana in Asunción and Estadio General Adrián Jara in Luque as home stadiums for the season.)	800
Sportivo Iteño	Itá	Salvador Morga	4,500
Sportivo Trinidense	Asunción	Martín Torres	3,000
Tacuary	Asunción	Toribio Vargas	3,000

== Standings ==
Pos	Team	Pld	W	D	L	GF	GA	GD	Pts	Qualification
1	General Caballero (JLM) (C, P)	34	22	7	5	67	31	+36	73	Promotion to Primera División and qualification for Copa Sudamericana first stage
2	Resistencia (P)	34	16	13	5	44	22	+22	61	Promotion to Primera División
3	Tacuary (P)	34	16	9	9	54	44	+10	57	Promotion to Primera División
4	Sportivo Ameliano (P)	34	16	8	10	51	37	+14	56	Qualification for Promotion play-off
5	San Lorenzo	34	14	11	9	60	44	+16	53	
6	Sportivo Trinidense	34	14	10	10	48	48	0	52	
7	Independiente (CG)	34	14	9	11	38	30	+8	51	
8	3 de Febrero	34	11	15	8	48	44	+4	48	
9	Fernando de la Mora	34	10	15	9	40	36	+4	45	
10	Atyrá	34	10	13	11	47	45	+2	43	
11	Guaraní (T)	34	10	11	13	34	37	−3	41	
12	Deportivo Santaní	34	9	14	11	38	42	−4	41	
13	Rubio Ñu	34	9	12	13	34	44	−10	39	
14	Sportivo Iteño	34	8	15	11	26	39	−13	39	
15	Deportivo Capiatá	34	8	15	11	34	47	−13	39	
16	2 de Mayo	34	9	9	16	39	55	−16	36	
17	General Díaz	34	6	6	22	25	53	−28	24	
18	Fulgencio Yegros	34	5	6	23	25	54	−29	21	

Source: APF
Rules for classification: 1) Points, 2) Playoff game (only if needed to decide promotion between two teams), 3) Goal difference, 4) Goals for, 5) Away goals for, 6) Drawing of lots.
(C) Champions; (P) Promoted

== Results ==
Home \ Away	2DM	3FE	ATY	CAP	SAN	FDM	FYE	GCM	GEN	GUA	IND	RES	RUB	SSL	SPA	SPI	TRI	TAC
2 de Mayo	—	3–4	3–0	0–0	2–0	0–0	2–1	3–1	0–3	0–0	0–2	1–0	1–0	1–8	1–3	1–1	4–0	0–1
3 de Febrero	1–1	—	2–2	2–2	0–2	1–1	1–1	1–4	4–2	1–1	0–0	0–0	2–1	2–2	0–0	0–1	2–1	3–0
Atyrá	2–2	2–0	—	4–1	0–2	2–2	2–3	0–1	2–1	2–2	2–1	1–1	0–0	1–2	1–1	1–1	0–0	1–2
Deportivo Capiatá	0–0	1–1	2–2	—	1–1	1–0	3–1	1–3	4–1	1–1	0–3	0–4	3–3	2–3	0–0	1–1	1–0	1–1
Deportivo Santaní	0–0	2–0	1–3	1–1	—	0–2	1–1	0–0	2–0	3–1	3–1	0–3	1–1	2–3	1–4	2–2	3–1	1–1
Fernando de la Mora	3–1	1–0	1–1	1–0	0–0	—	0–0	0–3	2–0	3–1	1–0	0–1	2–2	2–2	1–3	0–1	2–2	2–3
Fulgencio Yegros	2–1	0–1	0–1	1–2	2–1	0–2	—	1–3	0–0	1–2	0–0	0–1	0–3	1–1	2–1	0–1	0–1	0–1
General Caballero (JLM)	2–1	4–3	1–0	0–1	5–2	2–0	2–0	—	0–0	2–0	0–0	2–2	4–1	2–1	2–0	3–0	2–0	4–1
General Díaz	3–1	1–3	3–1	0–1	0–1	1–1	0–4	2–0	—	0–2	0–2	1–1	1–0	1–0	0–2	0–1	0–2	2–2
Guaraní (T)	0–2	0–0	1–0	4–0	0–0	0–0	1–0	1–1	1–0	—	0–1	0–2	0–1	2–1	0–0	2–1	3–5	1–2
Independiente (CG)	3–1	1–2	2–4	1–1	2–1	2–1	2–1	0–1	1–0	0–0	—	0–1	1–0	0–1	1–1	3–0	0–0	0–2
Resistencia	2–1	0–0	2–1	0–1	1–1	2–2	3–0	1–1	1–0	1–2	0–0	—	1–0	1–1	2–0	4–0	2–1	1–0
Rubio Ñu	0–2	2–0	0–3	0–0	1–0	2–1	2–1	2–2	3–1	0–0	1–0	1–1	—	3–2	0–1	0–0	2–2	1–3
San Lorenzo	3–1	0–1	1–1	2–1	1–1	1–3	2–0	1–3	1–0	1–0	1–2	1–1	2–0	—	2–0	1–1	5–1	2–2
Sportivo Ameliano	3–1	3–3	1–1	1–0	2–0	1–1	4–0	0–2	4–1	0–3	1–2	2–0	1–0	3–0	—	3–0	0–3	1–3
Sportivo Iteño	1–1	0–0	0–1	3–0	0–2	0–0	1–0	2–4	0–0	1–0	2–1	1–1	0–0	2–2	1–2	—	0–2	1–3
Sportivo Trinidense	1–0	2–4	2–1	2–1	1–1	1–1	3–1	1–0	3–1	2–1	1–1	1–0	2–2	0–3	2–1	0–0	—	2–2
Tacuary	5–1	1–4	1–2	0–0	0–0	0–2	3–1	3–1	1–0	3–2	1–3	0–1	4–0	1–1	1–2	0–0	2–1	—

Source: APF, Soccerway
Legend: Blue = home team win; Yellow = draw; Red = away team win.

== Top scorers ==
Rank	Name	Club	Goals
1	(Paraguay) Alex Arce	Sportivo Ameliano	24
2	(Paraguay) Digno González	3 de Febrero	22
3	(Paraguay) Gustavo Aguilar	Tacuary	20
4	(Paraguay) Jorge Sanguina	Atyrá	14
4	(Paraguay) Marcelo Ferreira	Independiente (CG)	14
4	(Paraguay) Santiago Salcedo	San Lorenzo	14
7	(Paraguay) Teodoro Arce	General Caballero (JLM)	11
7	(Uruguay) Antonio Oviedo	Rubio Ñu	11
9	(Paraguay) Ronald Roa	Deportivo Capiatá	10
9	(Paraguay) Édgar Villalba	Deportivo Santaní	10
9	(Paraguay) Adrián Alcaraz	Fernando de la Mora	10
9	(Paraguay) Sergio Dietze	Guaraní (T)	10
9	(Paraguay) Gustavo Legal	Sportivo Trinidense	10

Source: APF

== Promotion play-off ==
The fourth-placed team in the División Intermedia, Sportivo Ameliano, played a double-legged promotion play-off against Sportivo Luqueño, the ninth-placed team of the relegation table of the 2021 Primera División season. The winner was promoted to the 2022 Primera División.

7 December 2021
19:30 UTC−3

Sportivo Ameliano	3–2	Sportivo Luqueño
Giménez 21', 72'; Arce 63'	Report	Ortiz 17'; Palau 76'

Estadio Defensores del Chaco, Asunción
Referee: Carlos Benítez

11 December 2021
19:30 UTC−3

Sportivo Luqueño	1–1	Sportivo Ameliano
Castro 77'	Report	Giménez 42'

Estadio Defensores del Chaco, Asunción
Referee: Alipio Colmán

Sportivo Ameliano won 4–3 on aggregate and were promoted to Primera División.

== Relegation ==
Relegation is determined at the end of the season by computing an average of the number of points earned per game over the past three seasons. The three teams with the lowest average were relegated to the Primera División B or Primera División B Nacional for the following season, depending on their geographical location.

Pos	Team	2018 Pts	2019 Pts	2021 Pts	Total Pts	Total Pld	Avg	Relegation
1	General Caballero (JLM)	—	41	73	114	64	1.781	
2	Tacuary	—	—	57	57	34	1.676	
3	Sportivo Ameliano	—	—	56	56	34	1.647	
4	San Lorenzo	—	—	53	53	34	1.559	
5	Resistencia	40	45	61	146	94	1.553	
6	Fernando de la Mora	51	43	45	139	94	1.479	
7	2 de Mayo	46	55	36	137	94	1.457	
8	Independiente (CG)	—	41	51	92	64	1.438	
9	Atyrá	—	49	43	92	64	1.438	
10	Sportivo Trinidense	38	40	52	130	94	1.383	
11	3 de Febrero	—	39	48	87	64	1.359	
12	Rubio Ñu	44	35	39	118	94	1.255	
13	Guaraní (T)	—	—	41	41	34	1.206	
14	Deportivo Santaní	—	—	41	41	34	1.206	
15	Sportivo Iteño	34	36	39	109	94	1.16	
16	Deportivo Capiatá (R)	—	—	39	39	34	1.147	Relegation to Primera División B
17	Fulgencio Yegros (R)	41	24	21	86	94	0.915	Relegation to Primera División B
18	General Díaz (R)	—	—	24	24	34	0.706	Relegation to Primera División B

Source: APF

== See also ==
- 2021 Paraguayan Primera División season
- 2021 Copa Paraguay
