= Ángel Martínez (footballer, born 1983) =

Paraguayan former footballer (born 1983)

Personal information
- Full name: Ángel Marcelo Martínez Rotela
- Date of birth: 9 October 1983 (age 43)
- Place of birth: Asunción, Paraguay
- Height: 1.93 m (6 ft 4 in)
- Position: Defender

Team information
- Current team: Sol de América (reserves manager)

Senior career*
Years	Team	Apps	(Gls)
2000–2002	Olimpia		
2002–2003	Tacuary		
2004	Racing Club	14	(0)
2004–2005	Nacional Asunción		
2005	Valladolid	2	(0)
2006–2007	Nacional Asunción		
2006–2008	Tacuary		
2006–2008	12 de Octubre	9	(0)
2009	Universidad Católica	9	(0)
2009	12 de Octubre		
2011	Sport Colombia		
2012–2013	Sportivo Trinidense		
2014	Cristóbal Colón		

International career
- Paraguay U20
2005	Paraguay	1	(0)

Managerial career
- 2014: Sportivo Trinidense
- 2015: Sportivo Trinidense
- 2017: Martín Ledesma
- 2017: Resistencia
- 2018: Guaireña
- 2018: 2 de Mayo
- 2018: Resistencia
- 2019: Atyrá
- 2020–2021: Deportivo Capiatá
- 2022: Martín Ledesma
- 2023: Sportivo Carapeguá
- 2024–: Sol de América (reserves)
- 2024: Sol de América (interim)
- * Club domestic league appearances and goals

Ángel Marcelo Martínez Rotela (born 9 October 1983) is a Paraguayan football manager and former player who played as a defender. He is the current manager of Sol de América's reserve team.

== Playing career ==
Martínez played clubs in Argentina, Chile, Paraguay and Spain, later working as a manager.

In Argentina, Martínez played for Racing Club in 2004.

In Spain, Martínez played for Real Valladolid in 2005.

In Chile, Martínez played for Universidad Católica in 2009.

== Managerial career ==
In October 2019, Martínez resigned as manager of Atyrá F.C.
