= César Castro (footballer, born 1966) =

Paraguayan footballer and coach

Personal information
- Full name: César Augusto Castro Paiva
- Date of birth: 24 April 1966 (age 60)
- Place of birth: Asunción, Paraguay
- Height: 1.83 m (6 ft 0 in)
- Position: Centre back

Team information
- Current team: Sportivo Carapeguá (manager)

Senior career*
Years	Team	Apps	(Gls)
1985–1995	Olimpia		
1996	Nacional		
1997–1998	Sol de América		

International career
1985	Paraguay U20		
1987	Paraguay U23		

Managerial career
- 2000: Sol de América (assistant)
- 2001: Sol de América
- 2002: Nacional
- 2002: Sportivo San Lorenzo
- 2003–2004: Fernando de la Mora
- 2005: Olimpia (youth)
- 2006: Fernando de la Mora
- 2007: Sportivo Iteño
- 2008: Deportivo Pinozá
- 2009–2010: Olimpia (youth)
- 2010: 12 de Octubre SD
- 2011–2012: Olimpia (youth)
- 2013: Deportivo Santaní
- 2014–2015: Olimpia (youth)
- 2015: Sportivo San Lorenzo
- 2016: Deportivo Liberación
- 2018: Sportivo Ameliano
- 2023: Sol de América (reserves)
- 2023: Sol de América
- 2024: Deportivo Santaní
- 2024–: Sportivo Carapeguá
- * Club domestic league appearances and goals

César Augusto Castro Paiva (born 24 April 1966) is a Paraguayan football manager and former player who played as a central defender. He is the current manager of Sportivo Carapeguá.

Castro played for most his career for Olimpia Asunción where he won several national and international championships such as the Copa Libertadores and Supercopa Sudamericana.

He coached Sportivo San Lorenzo briefly in 2015 and Club Sol de America from Jan 2023 to Dec 2023.

== Honours ==
Olimpia

- Copa Libertadores: 1990
- Supercopa Sudamericana: 1990
- Recopa Sudamericana: 1990
- Paraguayan Primera División: 1993, 1995
- Torneo República: 1992

Sol de América

- Paraguayan División Intermedia: 2023
