= César Castro =

César Castro may refer to:

- César Castro (diver) (born 1982), Brazilian diver
- César Castro (footballer, born 1966), Paraguayan football defender and coach
- César Castro (footballer, born 1983), Venezuelan football defender
- César Castro (swimmer) (born 1999), Spanish swimmer
