= Alexis Rojas (footballer) =

Paraguayan footballer (born 1996)

Personal information
- Full name: Alexis Ricardo Rojas Villalba
- Date of birth: 8 October 1996 (age 30)
- Place of birth: Paraguay
- Height: 1.72 m (5 ft 8 in)
- Position: Right winger

Team information
- Current team: Pastoreo
- Number: 27

Senior career*
Years	Team	Apps	(Gls)
2015–2019	Sportivo Luqueño	92	(7)
2016	→ Fluminense (loan)	0	(0)
2018	Sport Huancayo	12	(0)
2019–2023	Cerro Porteño	1	(0)
2020	→ River Plate Asunción (loan)	7	(1)
2021–2022	→ 12 de Octubre (loan)	15	(0)
2022	→ Resistencia (loan)	3	(1)
2023	→ Guaireña (loan)	4	(0)
2024	12 de Junio	7	(0)
2024–	Pastoreo	10	(1)
- * Club domestic league appearances and goals as of 16 September 2024

Alexis Ricardo Rojas Villalba (born 8 October 1996) is a Paraguayan footballer who plays as a right winger for Pastoreo.
