= Alexis Rojas =

Alexis Rojas may refer to:

- Alexis Rojas (cyclist)
- Alexis Rojas (footballer)
