= Marco Prieto =

Paraguayan footballer (born 1985)

Personal information
- Full name: Marco Antonio Prieto
- Date of birth: 7 November 1985 (age 41)
- Place of birth: Asunción, Paraguay
- Height: 1.83 m (6 ft 0 in)
- Position: Forward

Senior career*
Years	Team	Apps	(Gls)
2008–2012	Cerro Porteño PF	13	(0)
2011	→ S. Carapeguá (loan)	13	(2)
2012	Sportivo Carapeguá		
2013	General Díaz	10	(5)
2013–2014	Nacional	32	(7)
2014	Mitre	15	(7)
2015	Central Córdoba SdE	33	(8)
2016–2017	Magallanes	19	(9)
2017	Unión Magdalena	21	(8)
2018	Ñublense	12	(2)
2018–2019	Chaco For Ever	16	(6)
2019–2021	River Plate	29	(5)
2021	Fernando de la Mora		
- * Club domestic league appearances and goals as of 20:15, 11 August 2022 (UTC)

Marco Antonio Prieto (born 7 November 1985) is a Paraguayan footballer, who plays as a forward.
