= Matías Maidana =

Argentine footballer (born 1987)

Personal information
- Full name: Matías David Maidana
- Place of birth: Adrogué, Argentina
- Height: 1.71 m (5 ft 7 in)
- Position: Defender

Youth career
- 2007-2008: Boca

Senior career*
Years	Team	Apps	(Gls)
2006-2007	Los Andes	13	(0)
2008-2009	Los Andes	17	(1)
2010	Deportivo Armenio	8	(0)
2011	Linense	2	(0)
2012	Caxias	1	(0)
2012	Tristán Suárez		
2013-2016	Berazategui	88	(2)
2016-2019	Cañuelas	91	(10)
2020	River Plate (Asunción)	9	(0)
- * Club domestic league appearances and goals

Matías David Maidana (born 9 March 1987) is an Argentine footballer who is last known to have played as a defender for River Plate (Asunción).

== Career ==
In 2007, Maidana joined the youth academy of Boca, Argentina's most successful clubs, after playing for Los Andes in the Argentine third division.

Before the 2011 season, he signed for Brazilian side Linense after playing for Deportivo Armenio in the Argentine third division.

Before the 2013 season, he signed for Argentine fourth division team Berazategui.

Before the 2020 season, Maidana signed for River Plate (Asunción) in the Paraguayan top flight after playing for Argentine fourth division outfit Cañuelas, where he made 9 league appearances and scored 0 goals.

He is the brother of footballer Jonatan Maidana.
