= Israel Rodríguez (Paraguayan footballer) =

Paraguayan footballer (born 1982)

Personal information
- Full name: Israel Rodrigo Rodríguez Colman
- Date of birth: 21 July 1982 (age 44)
- Place of birth: Asunción, Paraguay
- Height: 1.89 m (6 ft 2 in)
- Position: Forward

Youth career
- 1998–2000: Atlántida

Senior career*
Years	Team	Apps	(Gls)
2000–2001	Atlántida		
2002–2003	Sportivo Luqueño		
2003–2005	Thun		
2004–2005	→ Baulmes (loan)		
2005–2007	Sportivo Luqueño		
2007	Defensa y Justicia		
2007	Emelec		
2007	Baku	8	(1)
2008	Standard Sumgayit	8	(0)
2008–2009	Tampico Madero		
2012	Sportivo Carapeguá		
- * Club domestic league appearances and goals as of 30 December 2017

Israel Rodrigo Rodríguez Colman (born 21 July 1982) is a Paraguayan footballer whose last known club was Sportivo Carapeguá.

== Career ==
=== International ===
In December 2004, Rodríguez was pushing for a call up to the Paraguay national team due to his impressive goal scoring for FC Baulmes.

== Career statistics ==
As of 30 December 2017

Club	Season	League			National Cup		Continental		Total	
Club	Season	Division	Apps	Goals	Apps	Goals	Apps	Goals	Apps	Goals
Baku	2007–08	Azerbaijan Premier League	8	1			0	0	8	1
Standard Sumgayit	2007–08	Azerbaijan Premier League	8	0			–		8	0
Career total			16	1			0	0	16	1
