= Marcelo Casas =

Paraguayan footballer (born 1992)

Personal information
- Full name: Juan Marcelo Casas Chamorro
- Date of birth: 14 April 1992 (age 34)
- Position: Midfielder

Team information
- Current team: Guaraní F.B.C.

Youth career
- 2004–2009: Libertad
- 2009–2013: Panathinaikos

Senior career*
Years	Team	Apps	(Gls)
2013–2015	Panathinaikos	0	(0)
2015	22 de Septiembre		
2016	Fulgencio Yegros		(1)
2017–2018	22 de Septiembre		
2019	Athletic FBC	--	(--)
2021–2022	Guaraní F.B.C.		
- * Club domestic league appearances and goals

Juan Marcelo Casas Chamorro (born 14 April 1992) commonly referred to as Marcelo Casas is a Paraguayan-Spanish footballer who currently plays for Guaraní F.B.C. in the Paraguayan Division Intermedia.

In 2009, Casas joined the Panathinaikos Academy aged 17, playing for the club’s under-21 Golden Team in the Superleague Greece Youth Leagues, and was promoted to the Panathinaikos B team and first-team squad from the 2010–11 season under the works of Jesualdo Ferreira, until departing the club at the termination of the 2014-15 season.

== Career ==
=== Panathinaikos ===
In 2009, Casas was signed by Panathinaikos when he was still a minor and joined the club’s under-21’s Academy team. He signed with a Spanish passport, and was teammates with Greece under-21 player Giorgos Machlelis and Australia under-20 player Robert Stambolziev. On 18 August 2009, Casas played in a 1-1 home draw against PAO Rouf at the Apostolos Nikolaidis stadium in a 2009–10 pre-season friendly for Panathinaikos under-21’s Academy squad, sharing a strong team with Charalampos Mavrias, Nikos Kousidis, Stefanos Kapino, Nikos Marinakis , Anastasios Lagos, Konstantinos Triantafyllopoulos, Georgios Chionidis, Spyros Fourlanos and Alexandros Tabakis and coached by Juan Ramón Rocha.

On 10 December 2010, it was reported that Casas' former youth club, Primera División Paraguaya team Libertad would sue Panathinaikos for breach of trust. Casas travelled to Greece in 2009 to trial with Panathinaikos after Libertad received an invitation from Panathinaikos to trial the player for 30 days. According to Libertad, Panathinaikos asked Libertad for a one-month extension as the player was passing the trials. In that time, Panathinaikos convinced Casas to continue at the club without Libertad's permission, using the invitation as a trick, and the player signed for the club when he turned 18 years old. Libertad detailed that the club deserved expenses due to forming the player.

Under the tenure of Portuguese coach Jesualdo Ferreira during the 2010–11 and 2011–12 seasons, Casas worked the men’s team. He cited Ferreira as a Teacher and teammate Jean-Alain Boumsong as a role model.

=== 22 de Septiembre ===
Casas featured for 22 de Septiembre during the 2015 Primera División B Nacional. In October 2015, he featured during the promotion play-offs against Liga Ovetense as the latter eventually gained promotion to the 2016 División Intermedia. Subsequently, 22 de Septiembre were then forced to play a promotion play off against the runner-up of the Primera División B Metropolitana in order to ascend to the 2016 División Intermedia. In November 2015, Casas featured in both fixtures of the play-off against Club Fulgencio Yegros as 22 de Septiembre were defeated 4−2 on penalties after a 2−2 aggregate score.

=== Fulgencio Yegros ===
Casas made his first appearance for the club in Round 1 of the 2016 División Intermedia, playing a full 90 minutes of a 3−2 away victory against Ovetense. He then played a full 90 minutes in a 4−0 thrashing against Sport Colombia the following week. He would not play again until round 7 in a 1−0 away defeat against Sportivo Iteño. On 10 July 2016, he scores for the club in a 1−1 draw vs Ovetense.

=== 22 de Septiembre ===
Casas rejoined Club 22 de Septiembre in 2017 as they were promoted to the División Intermedia having won a promotion play off, the same promotion play off that the player had played in during 2015.

=== Athletic FBC ===
In 2019, Casas played for Encarnación team Athletic FBC in Paraguay's third-tier.

=== Guaraní FBC ===
In June 2021, Casas played in a 3–0 away victory against Sportivo Ameliano. In August 2021, he played in a 1–0 victory against General Díaz. In September 2021, he scored in the first goal in 30th minute of a 2–1 home victory against Sportivo Iteño. In September 2021, he played in a 2–0 away defeat against General Caballero JLM.

== Honours ==
=== Club ===
- 22 de Septiembre
  - Primera División B Nacional: Runners-up: 1
    - 2015
