= Mario Saldívar =

Paraguayan footballer (born 1990)

Personal information
- Full name: Mario Arsenio Saldívar Rojas
- Date of birth: September 12, 1990 (age 36)
- Place of birth: Asunción, Paraguay
- Height: 1.76 m (5 ft 9 in)
- Position: Right back

Team information
- Current team: River Plate
- Number: 6

Senior career*
Years	Team	Apps	(Gls)
2011	Independiente	23	(0)
2012	Figueirense	1	(0)
2013–2014	Sportivo Luqueño	33	(1)
2015	Libertad	21	(0)
2016	Tombense	9	(0)
2016	Sportivo Luqueño	6	(0)
2017	Independiente	27	(1)
2018–2019	Deportivo Santaní	12	(0)
2019–	River Plate	36	(0)
- * Club domestic league appearances and goals

Mario Arsenio Saldívar Rojas (born September 12, 1990) is a Paraguayan footballer, who plays for River Plate as a right back.
