= Diego Florentín =

Paraguayan footballer

Personal information
- Place of birth: Paraguay
- Position: Midfielder

Senior career*
Years	Team	Apps	(Gls)
- Club River Plate

International career
- Paraguay
- * Club domestic league appearances and goals

Diego Florentín was a Paraguayan football midfielder who played for Paraguay in the 1930 FIFA World Cup. He also played for Club River Plate. Florentín is deceased.
