= Guaraní F.B.C. =

Paraguayan professional football club

- Full name: Asociación Cultural y Deportiva Guaraní Foot-Ball Club
- Nickname: Aborígen (Aboriginal)
- Founded: 12 October 1960; 66 years ago
- Ground: Estadio Los Fundadores; Trinidad, Paraguay
- Capacity: 1,000
- Chairman: Derlis Arnold
- Manager: Eradio Espinoza
- League: Primera B Nacional
- 2023: Primera B Nacional, 6th of 6 in Group B
Home colours	Away colours

Asociación Cultural y Deportiva Guaraní Foot-Ball Club, best known as Guaraní de Trinidad, is a Paraguayan football club based in Trinidad, Itapúa. It was founded on 12 October 1960 and currently plays in the Primera B Nacional, one of the three third-division leagues in the Paraguayan football league system.

== History ==
Guaraní de Trinidad was founded on 12 October 1960 and joined the Liga Alto Paraná de Fútbol, a regional competition affiliated to the Unión del Fútbol del Interior (UFI) for football clubs from Hohenau and nearby districts such as Bella Vista, Jesús, Obligado, Pirapó and Trinidad. They won the Liga Alto Paraná competition three times in a row between 2017 and 2019.

The club entered the Campeonato Nacional B "Pre-Intermedia" (third tier competition organized by the UFI) for the first time in 2019, reaching the final where they defeated the team representing the Liga Carapegüeña (known as Sportivo Carapeguá in competitions organized by the Paraguayan Football Association) with a 4–2 aggregate score to earn direct promotion to the División Intermedia for the 2020 season. However, their debut in the latter competition was postponed to 2021 since the competition was not held in 2020 due to the COVID-19 pandemic.

Guaraní de Trinidad played in División Intermedia for two seasons, placing 11th in 2021 and 13th in the following season. However, they were relegated back to Primera B Nacional at the end of the 2022 season as they ended up in the bottom three places of the relegation table. Their relegation was confirmed on the last matchday of the tournament, with Guaraní losing 2–1 to Sportivo Luqueño.

== Honours ==
- Primera División B Nacional
  - Winners (1): 2019
- Liga Alto Paraná de Fútbol
  - Winners (3): 2017, 2018, 2019

== Current squad ==
As of 14 September 2021

Note: Flags indicate national team as defined under FIFA eligibility rules; some limited exceptions apply. Players may hold more than one non-FIFA nationality.

No.	Pos.	Nation	Player
1	GK	PAR	Hugo Benítez
2	DF	ARG	Martín Romero
3	DF	PAR	Juan Chamorro
4	DF	PAR	Juan Casas
5	MF	ARG	Rodrigo Freites
6	DF	PAR	Darío Gómez
7	MF	PAR	Marco González
8	MF	PAR	Miguel Alviso
9	FW	PAR	Leonardo Galeano
11	MF	PAR	Derlis Ortiz
12	GK	PAR	Derlis Britto
13	MF	PAR	Víctor Agüero
14	DF	PAR	Ángel Arce
15	MF	PAR	Fernando Domínguez

No.	Pos.	Nation	Player
16	FW	PAR	Mathias González
17	MF	ARG	Juan José Heinze
17	MF	PAR	Pablo Chaparro
18	DF	PAR	Hugo Portillo
19	FW	PAR	Sergio Dietze
20	MF	PAR	Christian Martínez
21	FW	PAR	Aníbal López
24	GK	URU	Matías Losada
—	DF	PAR	Juan Servián
—	DF	PAR	Adolfo Ortiz
—	DF	PAR	Ángel Gamarra
—	MF	PAR	Víctor Casas
—	FW	PAR	Marcelo Dávalos
