= Osvaldo Cabral =

Argentine footballer

Personal information
- Date of birth: June 4, 1985 (age 41)
- Place of birth: Clorinda, Argentina
- Height: 1.87 m (6 ft 2 in)
- Position: Goalkeeper

Senior career*
Years	Team	Apps	(Gls)
2003-2004	Belgrano de Córdoba		
2004	Huracán	1	(0)
2005-2006	Defensores de Belgrano		
2007-2012	Rubio Ñu	68	(0)
2013	2 de Mayo		
2013-2015	Rionegro Águilas	59	(0)
2016	C.D. Capiatá	7	(0)
2017	Macará	32	(1)
2018-2019	General Díaz	23	(0)
2019	Victoria	3	(0)
2020	C.A. River Plate	2	(0)
2021	12 de Octubre	4	(0)
2022	Juan Aurich		
- * Club domestic league appearances and goals

Osvaldo Cabral (born June 4, 1985, in Clorinda, Argentina) is an Argentine footballer currently playing for Rionegro Águilas of the Primera Division in Colombia.

== Teams ==
- (Argentina) Belgrano de Córdoba (2003–2004)
- (Argentina) Huracán (2004)
- (Argentina) Defensores de Belgrano (2005–2006)
- (Paraguay) Rubio Ñú (2007–2013)
- (Paraguay) 2 de Mayo (2013)
- (Colombia) Rionegro Águilas (2013–2015)
- (Paraguay) C.D. Capiatá (2016)
- (Ecuador) Macará (2017)
- (Paraguay) General Díaz (2018–2019)
- (Honduras) Victoria (2019)
- (Paraguay) C.A. River Plate (2020)
- (Paraguay) 12 de Octubre (2021)
- (Peru) Juan Aurich (2022)
