= Enrique Narvay =

Argentine footballer

Enrique Rafael Narvay (born 26 January 1990) is an Argentine former professional footballer who played as a forward.

== Teams ==
- Quilmes (2009–2011)
- San Martín de Mendoza (2011)
- Rivadavia de Lincoln (2012)
- Sportivo Carapeguá (2012)
- Guaraní Antonio Franco (2013)
- Comunicaciones (2013)
- Sport Huancayo (2014)
- Unión Aconquija (2016–2017)
- Club Sol de Mayo (2018–2019)
- Liniers de Bahía Blanca (2020)
- Sansinena (2020–2021)
- Liniers de Bahía Blanca (2022–2023)
