= Club 22 de Setiembre =

Paraguayan football club

Club 22 de Setiembre is a Paraguayan football club in the city of Encarnación. The club currently plays in the Primera B Nacional.

== History ==
In the 2015 Primera División B Nacional season, the club played a promotion play-off against Liga Ovetense to ascend into the División Intermedia for 2016. 22 de Septiembre lost the fixtures on aggregate and would then play the runner-up of the Primera B Metropolitana in order to ascend into the División Intermedia.

== Notable players ==
To appear in this section a player must have either:

- Played at least 125 games for the club.
- Set a club record or won an individual award while at the club.
- Been part of a national team at any time.
- Played in the first division of any other football association (outside of Paraguay).
- Played in a continental and/or intercontinental competition.

Paraguayan players

- (Paraguay) Javier Acuña (2001–2002: Youth Academy)
- (Paraguay) (Spain) Juan Marcelo Casas Chamorro (2015)

Non-CONMEBOL players

- Ninguno
