= Rodrigo Cantero =

Paraguayan footballer (born 1985)

Personal information
- Full name: Rodrigo Fabián Cantero
- Date of birth: 19 July 1985 (age 41)
- Place of birth: Fernando de la Mora, Paraguay
- Height: 1.70 m (5 ft 7 in)
- Position: Midfielder

Senior career*
Years	Team	Apps	(Gls)
2004–2008	Nacional	113	(13)
2009	Ñublense	9	(1)
2009	12 de Octubre	9	(0)
2010	Sportivo Trinidense	43	(4)
2011	General Caballero ZC	3	(0)
2011	Fernando de la Mora	11	(1)
2012–2013	Sportivo Carapeguá	29	(0)
2013	Independiente FBC		
2017–2018	Fernando de la Mora		
2021–2024	3 de Febrero FBC		

International career
2005	Paraguay U20		
- * Club domestic league appearances and goals

Rodrigo Fabián Cantero (born 19 July 1985) is a Paraguayan former professional footballer who played as a midfielder.

== Teams ==
- (Paraguay) Nacional 2003–2008
- (Chile) Ñublense 2009
- (Paraguay) 12 de Octubre 2009
- (Paraguay) Sportivo Trinidense 2010
- (Paraguay) General Caballero ZC 2011
- (Paraguay) Fernando de la Mora 2011
- (Paraguay) Sportivo Carapeguá 2012–2013
- (Paraguay) Independiente FBC 2013
- (Paraguay) Fernando de la Mora 2017–2018
- (Paraguay) 3 de Febrero FBC 2021–2024

== International ==
- Paraguay U20 2005
