= Club 24 de Setiembre =

- Nickname: El decano aregüeño (The dean from Areguá)
- Founded: September 24, 1914
- Ground: Estadio Próculo Cortázar; Areguá, Paraguay
- Capacity: 2,500
- Coordinates: 25.2869°S 57.4366°W
- Chairman: Claudelino Agüero
- Manager: Alicio Solalinde
- League: Primera B Metropolitana
- 2023: División Intermedia, 14th of 16 (Relegated by average)
- Website: https://www.instagram.com/24deset
Home colours	Away colours

Club 24 de Setiembre, also known as 24 de Setiembre VP, is a Paraguayan football club based in Valle Pucú in the municipality of Areguá. It was founded on September 24, 1914, coinciding with the festivity of the Virgin of Mercy, patron saint of the community. It was affiliated to the Unión del Fútbol del Interior (UFI) until 2015, the club is multi-champion of the Liga Aregüeña de Fútbol, being two-time champions in 2014 and 2015.

Affiliated to the Paraguayan Football Association (APF) in 2015, it has competed in its divisions since 2016. As of 2023, it plays in División Intermedia, the second division in the Paraguayan football league system, after finishing second in the 2022 Primera B Metropolitana.

== History ==
=== Its beginnings ===
The club was founded on September 24, 1914, thus being the first club established in the city of Areguá, the first president of the club was Miguel Saldivar. Since 1950 it has been affiliated to the Liga Aregüeña de Fútbol and therefore to the Unión del Fútbol del Interior. The first Liga Aregüeña title was won in 1952, repeating that conquest in 1953 and 1956.

=== Other titles and regional championship ===
The title of champion of the Liga Aregüeña de Fútbol in 1968 was obtained undefeated, that same year they reached the finals of the Cuarta Región Deportiva, facing Martín Ledesma, finally finishing as runner-up.

They returned to conquer the Liga Aregüeña de Fútbol in 1973, as well as in 1978, that same year they also won the title of champion this time on the Quinta Región Deportiva, defeating Olimpia of Itauguá in the final, thus becoming the first club from Aregüa to get that regional title.

They obtained again the Liga Aregüeña de Fútbol championship titles in 1973, 1978, 1980, 1982, 1985, 1990 and 1999.

== Stadium ==
The club plays at home in the Estadio Próculo Cortázar, which has a capacity for about 2,500 people.
