= Diego Barreto (footballer, born 1993) =

Paraguayan footballer (born 1993)

Personal information
- Full name: Diego Fabián Barreto Lara
- Date of birth: 31 May 1993 (age 33)
- Place of birth: Asunción, Paraguay
- Height: 1.80 m (5 ft 11 in)
- Position: Attacking midfielder

Team information
- Current team: Sportivo Ameliano
- Number: 19

Youth career
- 2010–2013: Grêmio
- 2013: Flamengo
- 2014: Olimpia

Senior career*
Years	Team	Apps	(Gls)
2013	Grêmio	0	(0)
2015	Capiatá	1	(0)
2016	General Díaz	12	(0)
2017–2018	Alianza Petrolera	34	(8)
2019	Atlético Huila	15	(0)
2020	River Plate	5	(0)
2022	Sportivo Ameliano	21	(5)
2023	Comunicaciones	13	(2)
2023–2024	Sportivo Ameliano	20	(1)
2024	Oriente Petrolero	28	(2)
2025–	Sportivo Ameliano	9	(1)
- * Club domestic league appearances and goals as of 13 August 2025

Diego Fabián Barreto Lara (born 31 May 1993) is a Paraguayan professional footballer who plays as a forward for Sportivo Ameliano.

== Career statistics ==
=== Club ===
As of 4 May 2019.

Club	Season	League			Cup		Other		Total	
Club	Season	Division	Apps	Goals	Apps	Goals	Apps	Goals	Apps	Goals
Grêmio	2013	Série A	0	0	0	0	0	0	0	0
Capiatá	2015	Paraguayan Primera División	1	0	0	0	0	0	1	0
General Díaz	2016	Paraguayan Primera División	12	0	0	0	0	0	12	0
Alianza Petrolera	2017	Categoría Primera A	16	4	1 (Note: Appearances in the Copa Colombia)	1	0	0	17	5
Alianza Petrolera	2018	Categoría Primera A	18	4	0	0	0	0	18	4
Alianza Petrolera	Total		34	8	1	1	0	0	35	9
Atlético Huila	2019	Categoría Primera A	10	0	2	0	0	0	12	0
Career total			5	0	4	1	0	0	9	1
