= Diego Benítez (footballer, born 1991) =

Paraguayan footballer

Personal information
- Full name: Diego Javier Benítez
- Date of birth: 18 February 1991 (age 35)
- Place of birth: Encarnación, Paraguay

Senior career*
Years	Team	Apps	(Gls)
2005–2006	12 de Octubre		
2006–2010	Textil Mandiyú	67	(4)
2008	→ San Luis de Quillota (loan)		
2010	Olimpia		
2011	San Lorenzo		
2011	12 de Octubre		
2012–2013	Sportivo Carapegua		
2016	Atlético Cali		
- * Club domestic league appearances and goals

Diego Javier Benítez (born 18 February 1991 in Encarnación) is a Paraguayan professional footballer who plays as a midfielder.
