= Copa San Isidro de Curuguaty =

The Copa San Isidro de Curuguaty (English: San Isidro de Curuguaty Cup) is a football (soccer) tournament of regional character played between the champions of the Campeonato Nacional de Interligas organized by the Unión del Fútbol del Interior (Paraguay) and the Copa Nacional de Selecciones del Interior organized by the Organización del Fútbol del Interior (Uruguay).

== History ==
The tournament was created by Eusebio Baeza, former executive of Pluna and the Asociación Uruguaya de Fútbol, and Arturo Filartiga Candia, member of the Asociación Paraguaya de Fútbol. The tournament is played every two years since 1978 with home and away games. If teams tie in points and goals the game is decided by penalty kicks.

== Winners ==
Year	Winner	Runners-up	Aggregate	1st leg	2nd leg
1956	(Uruguay) Flores	(Paraguay) Liga Central	4-2	2-1	2-1
1959	(Uruguay) Río Negro	(Paraguay) Villeta	7-1	3-0	4-1
1963	(Uruguay) Colonia (Note: Colonia participated instead of Melo.)	(Paraguay) Ypacaraí	3-3 (Note: Colonia declared champion after mutual agreement with Ypacarai.)	0-1	3-2
1966	(Uruguay) Tacuarembó	(Paraguay) Coronel Oviedo	4-1	2-0	2-1
1978	(Paraguay) Federación Misionera (Note: Now known and competes as Liga Ignaciana.)	(Uruguay) Melo	4-0	1-0	3-0
1980	(Paraguay) Federación Misionera	(Uruguay) Tacuarembó	5-5 (3-2 p)	2-1	3-4
1982	(Uruguay) Maldonado	(Paraguay) Villarrica	1-1 (4-3 p)	1-0	0-1
1984	(Paraguay) San Pedro	(Uruguay) Rocha	4-3	1-3	3-0
1988	(Uruguay) Paysandú	(Paraguay) Paranaense	4-3	1-2	3-1
1990	(Paraguay) Ypacaraí	(Uruguay) Florida	2-1	1-0	1-1
1992	(Paraguay) Liga del Sud	(Uruguay) Minas	6-1	2-0	4-1
1994	(Uruguay) Maldonado	(Paraguay) Caaguazú	9-2	4-0	5-2
1996	(Paraguay) Paranaense	(Uruguay) Maldonado Interior	3-3 (Note: Paranaense winners after Maldonado Interior had five red cards in the game.)	2-2	1-1
1998	(Paraguay) Itauguá	(Uruguay) Melo	4-3	1-1	3-2
2000	(Uruguay) San José Liga Mayor	(Paraguay) Carapeguá	2-2 (4-2 p)	1-1	1-1
2002	(Paraguay) Limpio	(Uruguay) Durazno	5-4	5-4	0-0
2004	(Paraguay) San José de los Arroyos	(Uruguay) Durazno (Note: Durazno participated instead of Mercedes.)	4-3	0-2	4-1
2006	(Paraguay) Pirayú	(Uruguay) Maldonado Liga Mayor	3-3 (4-2 p)	1-2	2-1
2008	(Uruguay) Colonia Departamental	(Paraguay) Caaguazú	4-2	3-1	1-1
2010	(Paraguay) Liga Caacupeña	(Uruguay) Artigas	3-1	1-1	2-0
2012	(Paraguay) Liga Paranaense	(Uruguay) Colonia	3-2	1-1	2-1
2014	(Paraguay) Liberación	(Uruguay) Tacuarembó	1-1 (a)	0-0	1-1
2016	(Paraguay) Liga Guaireña	(Uruguay) Nueva Palmira	4-2	3-1	1-1
2018	(Paraguay) Liga Atyreña	(Uruguay) Durazno	3-3 (4-3 p)	2-1	1-2
2023	(Uruguay) Lavalleja	(Paraguay) Liga Encarnacena	4-4 (3-0 p)	2-1	2-3

== Titles per country and team ==
Paraguay	15
Federación Misionera	2
Paranaense	2
Itauguá	1
Liga del Sud	1
Limpio	1
Pirayuense	1
San José de los Arroyos	1
San Pedro	1
Ypacaraí	1
Caacupé	1
Liberación	1
Guaireña	1
Atyreña	1

Uruguay	10
Colonia Departamental	2
Maldonado	2
Río Negro	1
Lavalleja	1
Paysandú	1
San José Liga Mayor	1
Tacuarembó	1
Flores	1

== Notes ==
- Campeonato Nacional de Interligas
