= Estadio Jardines del Kelito =

Football stadium in Paraguay

Jardines del Kelito
- Estadio River Plate
- Interactive map of Jardines del Kelito
- Full name: Estadio Los Jardines del Kelito
- Address: Teodoro Mongelós 3800, Mburicaó; Asunción; Paraguay
- Coordinates: 25.305128°S 57.598172°W
- Capacity: 6,500
- Field size: 105 × 74 m

Construction
- Opened: 1987
- Renovated: 2016
- Expanded: 2017

Tenant
- River Plate Asunción

Estadio Jardines del Kelito is a football stadium in Paraguay that is located in the city of Asunción. It is the home venue of River Plate Asunción.

River Plate Asunción's former stadium, which was located in the Mariscal López and General Santos avenues, was previously known as Kelito after the club received a donation of brass from a factory named Helados Kelito. After the club bought a building, its yard was known as Los Jardines del Kelito.

Opened in 1987, the stadium was renovated in 2016 after River Plate achieved promotion to the Primera División, receiving a new lighting system. In the following year, a new grandstand was built, with the capacity of the stadium increasing in 1,500 and reaching 6,500 spectators.
