= Edgar Denis =

Paraguayan footballer (born 1969)

Personal information
- Full name: Edgar Antonio Denis Ayala
- Date of birth: 11 December 1969 (age 56)
- Place of birth: Asunción, Paraguay
- Position: Forward

Youth career
- Presidente Hayes

Senior career*
Years	Team	Apps	(Gls)
1987–1992	Presidente Hayes		
1992	Libertad		
1993	Olimpia		
1993–1994	Presidente Hayes		
1994	Colón		
1994–1995	Cerro Corá		
1995	Universitario	6	(2)
1996	Sol de América		
1996–1997	Guaraní	3	(1)
1997	Shanghai Shenhua		
1997	Deportivo Cali		
1998	Nacional		
1998	Sportivo Luqueño		
1999	Olimpia		
2000	Atlético Colegiales		
2000	Audax Italiano	3	(0)
2000–2001	Atlético Colegiales	20	(8)
2001	Sportivo Luqueño		(2)
2002	Deportivo Recoleta		

International career
1993–1995	Paraguay	9	(0)

Managerial career
- 2009: 3 de Febrero
- 2011: Colegiales
- 2012–2013: Deportivo Capiatá
- 2013: 2 de Mayo
- 2013: Sportivo San Lorenzo
- 2015: Sport Colombia
- 2016: Deportivo Liberación
- 2016: Pilcomayo
- 2016: Deportivo Santaní
- 2017: Sport Colombia
- 2018: Rubio Ñu
- 2018: Deportivo Liberación
- 2019: 2 de Mayo
- * Club domestic league appearances and goals

Edgar Antonio Denis Ayala (born 11 December 1969), known as Edgar Denis, is a Paraguayan football manager and former player.

e played for Clubs of Paraguay, Argentina and Chile as a forward. He played for the Paraguay national team in the 1995 Copa América in Uruguay.

== Teams ==
- (Paraguay) Presidente Hayes 1987–1992
- (Paraguay) Libertad 1992
- (Paraguay) Olimpia 1993
- (Paraguay) Presidente Hayes 1993-1994
- (Argentina) Colón 1994
- (Paraguay) Cerro Corá 1994-1995
- (Peru) Universitario 1995
- (Paraguay) Sol de América 1996
- (Paraguay) Guaraní 1996-1997
- (China) Shanghai Shenhua 1997
- (Colombia) Deportivo Cali 1997
- (Paraguay) Nacional 1998
- (Paraguay) Sportivo Luqueño 1998
- (Paraguay) Colegiales 1997-2001
- (Paraguay) Olimpia 1999
- (Paraguay) Atlético Colegiales 2000
- (Chile) Audax Italiano 2000
- (Paraguay) Atlético Colegiales 2000-2001
- (Paraguay) Sportivo Luqueño 2001
- (Paraguay) Deportivo Recoleta 2002

== Personal life ==
He is nicknamed Araña (Spider).
