= Fernando Román (footballer, born 1998) =

Paraguayan professional footballer

Personal information
- Full name: Fernando Aurelio Román Villalba
- Date of birth: 20 November 1998 (age 27)
- Place of birth: Ñemby, Paraguay
- Height: 1.80 m (5 ft 11 in)
- Position: Left-back

Team information
- Current team: Defensa y Justicia
- Number: 3

Youth career
- Escuela de Fútbol Pastoreo
- Libertad

Senior career*
Years	Team	Apps	(Gls)
2017–2018	Libertad	2	(0)
2018–2020	Cerro Porteño	0	(0)
2020–2026	Aldosivi	68	(0)
2023	→ Nacional (loan)	36	(0)
2024	→ Olimpia (loan)	14	(1)
2026–	Defensa y Justicia	1	(0)
- * Club domestic league appearances and goals as of 17:31, 25 July 2026 (UTC)

Fernando Aurelio Román Villalba (born 20 November 1998) is a Paraguayan professional footballer who plays as a left-back for Argentine club Defensa y Justicia.

== Career ==
Román played for the Escuela de Fútbol Pastoreo in his early years, prior to heading to Libertad. He made the breakthrough into senior football during the 2017 campaign, making first-team appearances in September against Sportivo Trinidense and Nacional. Those were his only matches, with a move to fellow Primera División team Cerro Porteño following in June 2018. Two years later, having only featured in the Copa Paraguay, Román headed off to Argentina after agreeing terms with Aldosivi on 29 September 2020; having trained there since the start of the year. He made his debut on 14 November against San Lorenzo.

== Career statistics ==
As of 29 January 2023.

Appearances and goals by club, season and competition
Club	Division	League			Cup		Continental		Total	
Club	Division	Season	Apps	Goals	Apps	Goals	Apps	Goals	Apps	Goals
Libertad	Paraguayan Primera División	2017	2	0	0	0	0	0	2	0
Cerro Porteño	Paraguayan Primera División	2018	0	0	1	0	0	0	1	0
Cerro Porteño	Paraguayan Primera División	2019	0	0	0	0	0	0	0	0
Cerro Porteño	Paraguayan Primera División	2020	0	0	0	0	0	0	0	0
Cerro Porteño	Total		0	0	1	0	0	0	1	0
Aldosivi	Argentine Primera División	2020	0	0	7	0	—		7	0
Aldosivi	Argentine Primera División	2021	16	0	0	0	—		16	0
Aldosivi	Argentine Primera División	2022	22	0	1	0	—		23	0
Aldosivi	Total		38	0	8	0	—		46	0
Nacional	Paraguayan Primera División	2023	1	0	0	0	0	0	1	0
Career total			41	0	9	0	0	0	50	0
