= Pastoreo F.C. =

Paraguayan football club

- Full name: Pastoreo Fútbol Club
- Founded: 14 June 2020; 6 years ago
- Ground: Estadio Liga Caaguazú de Fútbol; Caaguazú, Paraguay
- Capacity: 5,000
- Chairman: José Asunción Espínola
- Manager: Elio Espínola
- League: Primera B Nacional
- 2025: División Intermedia, 5th of 16 (relegated by average)
Home colours	Away colours

Pastoreo Fútbol Club, also known as Pastoreo FC or simply Pastoreo, is a Paraguayan football club based in Doctor Juan Manuel Frutos, locally known as Pastoreo. The club was founded in 2020 and played until 2025 in the División Intermedia, the second division in the Paraguayan football league system. It belongs to the Caaguazú Football Federation and was the 2019–20 Campeonato Nacional de Interligas champion.

== History ==
The club was founded on 14 June 2020, based on the team representing the Pastoreo Sports League (Liga Deportiva de Pastoreo) in the Campeonato Nacional de Interligas, which won the competition in its 2019–20 edition after beating the team representing the Hernandarias league in the final. With this title the Pastoreo league earned the right to compete in the División Intermedia, however, in order to take part in competitions overseen by the Paraguayan Football Association such as the División Intermedia, teams promoted from the Campeonato Nacional de Interligas have to be refounded as clubs, causing the Liga de Pastoreo team to be refounded as Pastoreo Fútbol Club.

Although they were entitled to enter the 2021 Paraguayan División Intermedia competition by having won the 2019–20 Interligas championship, the cancellation of the 2020 División Intermedia season due to the COVID-19 pandemic meant that they had their debut postponed to 2022 per decision by the APF's Executive Committee, since Guaraní de Trinidad (who were originally slated to have their debut in 2020) already held the berth reserved to the Unión del Fútbol del Interior (UFI) for that season as 2019 Primera B Nacional champions. They eventually played the División Intermedia for the first time in 2022, ending the season in fourth place after being in contention for promotion to the top tier until the last rounds of the competition.

Pastoreo competed in the División Intermedia until the 2025 season, in which the team placed fifth in the standings. However, they were relegated due to a poor campaign in the previous season that had an impact on the team's placement in the relegation table, which takes into account performances over the three most recent seasons. In that table, Pastoreo had 107 points in 90 matches, placing second-from-last and being relegated to the third tier as a result.
