= Club Fulgencio Yegros =

Paraguayan football club

Fulgencio Yegros
- Full name: Club Fulgencio Yegros
- Nickname: El Prócer
- Founded: May 14, 1924; 102 years ago
- Ground: Parque Fulgencio Yegros, Ñemby, Paraguay
- Capacity: 1,000
- Chairman: Daniel García
- Manager: Ricardo Torresi
- League: División Intermedia
- 2021: División Intermedia, 18th of 18 (Relegated by average)
Home colours

Club Fulgencio Yegros is a Paraguayan association football club based in the city of Ñemby in the Central Department. It is named after Paraguay's first Head of State, Fulgencio Yegros y Franco de Torres.

It was founded on 14 May 1924 and plays in the División Intermedia, Paraguay's second tier.

This is referred to as El Prócer.

== History ==
In the 2016 División Intermedia season, the club's debut season in the mentioned league, Fulgencio Yegros commences with much success in the championship after achieving first position on the table after the first several matches.

== Notable players ==
To appear in this section a player must have either:

- Played at least 125 games for the club.
- Set a club record or won an individual award while at the club.
- Been part of a national team at any time.
- Played in the first division of any other football association (outside of Paraguay).
- Played in a continental and/or intercontinental competition.
Paraguayan players
- (Paraguay) (Spain) Juan Marcelo Casas Chamorro (2016–)

Non-CONMEBOL players

- Ninguno
