= Atyrá F.C. =

Paraguayan professional football club

- Full name: Atyrá Fútbol Club
- Founded: 7 April 2018; 7 years ago
- Ground: Estadio San Francisco de Asís; Atyrá, Paraguay
- Capacity: 10,000
- Chairman: Rubén Darío Deggeller
- Manager: Carlos Ferreira
- League: Primera B Nacional
- 2023: División Intermedia, 15th of 16 (Relegated by average)
Home colours	Away colours

Atyrá Fútbol Club is a Paraguayan football club based in the city of Atyrá. It was founded on 7 April 2018 and will play in the Paraguayan Primera División B Nacional, one of the third division leagues of the Paraguayan football league system in 2024, after their relegation from the Paraguayan División Intermedia at the end of the 2023 season.

== History ==
The club was founded on 7 April 2018 based on the team representing the Liga Atyreña de Deportes in the Campeonato Nacional de Interligas, the third-tier competition for regional leagues affiliated to the Unión del Fútbol del Interior (UFI). With Juan Manuel Battaglia as manager, the Liga Atyreña team won the 2017–18 Campeonato Nacional de Interligas by beating the team representing the Liga Pilarense in the final, thus earning the right to compete in the División Intermedia for the 2019 season. That same year, the Liga Atyreña won the Copa San Isidro de Curuguaty by beating Durazno, the champions of the Uruguayan Copa Nacional de Selecciones del Interior. Since league teams promoted from the Campeonato Nacional de Interligas have to be refounded as clubs in order to take part in competitions overseen by the Paraguayan Football Association such as the División Intermedia, the Liga Atyreña team was refounded as Atyrá Fútbol Club.

For their first campaign in the División Intermedia, Atyrá hired the former Paraguayan footballer Ángel Martínez Rotela as manager. Their first match in the competition ended in victory, defeating Ovetense at home by a 3–0 score. Atyrá's performance in their first participation in the División Intermedia was consistent, however they fell short of reaching promotion to the Paraguayan Primera División as they finished the season in fourth place with 49 points, trailing the eventually promoted sides Guaireña and 12 de Octubre by eight and seven points, respectively.

Atyrá played in División Intermedia for four seasons, being relegated on the final round of the 2023 season after losing 3–2 to Deportivo Recoleta at home and placing in the bottom three of the relegation table.

== Stadium ==
The club plays its home matches at Estadio San Francisco de Asís in Atyrá, which has a capacity of 10,000 spectators.

== Honours ==
As Liga Atyreña de Deportes:

- Campeonato Nacional de Interligas
  - Champions (1): 2017–18
  - Runners-up (1): 2015–16
- Copa San Isidro de Curuguaty
  - Champions (1): 2018
