= Mburicaó =

Coordinates: 25.3001°S 57.6002°W

- Barrio
- Interactive map of Mburicaó
- Country: Paraguay
- Autonomous Capital District: Gran Asunción
- City: Asunción

Mburicaó is a neighbourhood (barrio) of Asunción, Paraguay.
