= Deportivo Liberación =

Paraguayan association football club

Club Deportivo Liberación is a Paraguayan football club in the city of Liberación in the San Pedro Department. It was founded in 2014. The club's highest achievement was finishing 3rd in the 2015 División Intermedia.

== History ==
The club played in Paraguay's second tier, the División Intermedia, from 2015 to 2018. In 2018, the club was coached by former footballer Edgar Denis.

== Stadium ==
The club plays its home games at the Estadio Juan José Vazquéz in San Estanislao, the stadium of neighbour city club Deportivo Santani.
