= Trinidad, Paraguay =

Trinidad
- District
- Location within Paraguay
- Coordinates: 27°7′12″S 55°46′48″W
- Country: Paraguay
- Department: Itapúa Department

Population (2002)
  - Total: 6 873

Trinidad (Spanish for Trinity) is a district in the Itapúa Department of Paraguay. It is well known for its Jesuit Mission, La Misión de la Santísima Trinidad de Paraná. In 1993, the mission was declared a UNESCO World Heritage Site, and is open to visitation by tourists.

== Geography ==
Trinidad is located on Ruta 6ta, 30 kilometers north of the department's capital, Encarnación. It is surrounded by the following districts:

- Jesus and Hohenau to the north,
- Nueva Alborada and Hohenau to the east,
- Nueva Alborada and Capitán Miranda to the south,
- Capitán Miranda to the west.

== Population ==
According to the 2002 census, by the Dirección General de Estadísticas, Encuestas y Censos, the district had a total of 6,873 inhabitants. 35% (2,417) percent living in the center of the district, and 65% (4,456 ) in rural areas.

== Sources ==
- World Gazeteer: Paraguay – World-Gazetteer.com
