= Campeonato Nacional de Interligas =

Football event in Paraguay

- Country: Paraguay
- Promotion to: División Intermedia
- Relegation to: Primera C
- Current: 2024 season

The Campeonato Nacional de Interligas (Spanish for National Championship of Interleague) is the biggest football event involving teams with combined players from different clubs of every regional leagues in Paraguay from all departments. The tournament is organized by the Unión del Fútbol del Interior (UFI).

== History ==
Its first edition was played in 1927, same year of foundation of the Unión del Fútbol del Interior. The tournament is played (with a few exceptions) every two years, and the winner qualifies to play the Copa San Isidro de Curuguaty championship game.

== List of champions ==
=== Traditional format (1927–2010) ===
Ed.	Season	Champion
1	1927	Liga Ypacaraiense de Fútbol
2	1936–37	Liga Regional de Fútbol Paraguarí
3	1938	Liga Guaireña de Fútbol
4	1949	Liga Central de Deportes
5	1950	Liga Guaireña de Fútbol
6	1951	Liga Central de Deportes
7	1952	Liga Central de Deportes
8	1953	Liga Ypacaraiense de Fútbol
9	1954	Liga Guaireña de Fútbol
10	1955	Liga Central de Deportes
11	1957	Liga Villetana de Fútbol
12	1959	Liga Central de Deportes
13	1961–62	Liga Ypacaraiense de Fútbol
14	1963–64	Liga Ovetense de Fútbol
15	1965–66	Liga Ovetense de Fútbol
16	1967–68	Liga Concepcionera de Fútbol
17	1969–70	Liga Concepcionera de Fútbol
18	1971–72	Liga Central de Deportes
19	1973–74	Liga Carapegüeña de Fútbol
20	1975–76	Liga Deportiva Paranaense
21	1977–78	Federación Deportiva Misionera - San Ignacio
22	1979–80	Federación Deportiva Misionera - San Ignacio
23	1981–82	Liga Guaireña de Fútbol
24	1983–84	Liga Sampedrana de Fútbol
25	1985–86	Liga Santaniana de Fútbol
26	1987–88	Liga Deportiva Paranaense
27	1989–90	Liga Ypacaraiense de Fútbol
28	1991–92	Liga Regional del Sud de Fútbol
29	1993–94	Liga Caaguaceña de Fútbol
30	1995–96	Liga Deportiva Paranaense
31	1997–98	Liga Itaugüeña de Fútbol
32	1999–00	Liga Carapegüeña de Fútbol
33	2001–02	Federación Limpeña de Fútbol
34	2003–04	Liga Sanjosiana de Deportes
35	2005–06	Liga Pirayuense de Deportes
36	2007–08	Liga Caaguaceña de Fútbol
37	2009–10	Liga Caacupeña de Deportes

=== Pre-Intermedia (2008–2010) ===
Ed.	Season	Champion
–	2008–09	Liga Santaniana de Fútbol
–	2009–10	Liga Carapegüeña de Fútbol

=== Current format (2011–present) ===
Ed.	Season	Champion	Runner-up
38	2011–12	Liga Deportiva Paranaense	Liga Ovetense de Fútbol
39	2013–14	Liga Social Cultural y Deportiva Liberación	Liga Itaugüeña de Fútbol
40	2015–16	Liga Guaireña de Fútbol	Liga Atyreña de Deportes
41	2017–18	Liga Atyreña de Deportes	Liga Pilarense de Fútbol
42	2019–20	Liga Deportiva de Pastoreo	Liga Hernandariense de Fútbol
43	2022–23	Liga Encarnacena de Fútbol	Liga Horqueteña de Futbol
44	2024–25	Liga Regional de Fútbol Paraguarí	Liga Sanjosiana de Deportes

== Titles by club ==
Club	Titles	Seasons won
Liga Central de Deportes	6	1949, 1951, 1952, 1955, 1959, 1971
Liga Guaireña de Fútbol	5	1938, 1950, 1954, 1981-82, 2015-16
Ypacaraí	4	1927, 1953, 1961-62, 1989-90
Paranaense	4	1975, 1987, 1995, 2012
Caaguazú	2	
Ovetense	2	
Concepción	2	
Carapeguá	2	
Misionera	2	
Encarnación	1	2023
Pastoreo	1	2020
Atyrá	1	2018
Liberación	1	2014
Caacupe	1	2010
Paraguari	1	
Villeta	1	
Sampedrana	1	
Santaniana	1	
Liga del Sud	1	
Limpio	1	
Itauguá	1	
San José de los Arroyos	1	
Pirayú	1	
