= Club River Plate (Asunción) =

Paraguayan football club based in Asunción founded in 1911

River Plate
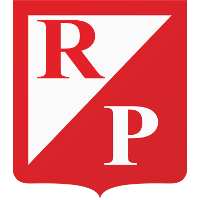
- Full name: Club River Plate
- Nickname: El Kelito
- Founded: 15 January 1911; 115 years ago
- Ground: Estadio Jardines del Kelito
- Capacity: 6,500
- Manager: Celso Ayala
- League: Primera B Metropolitana
- 2025: División Intermedia, 10th of 16 (relegated by average)
Home colours	Away colours	Third colours

Club River Plate, mostly known as River Plate or internationally as River Plate Asunción, is a Paraguayan football club from the neighbourhood of Mburicaó, in Asunción; founded in 1911. The club has been playing in the lower divisions of the Paraguayan league for several decades and their most notable achievements are the three second-place finish achieved when they were playing in the Paraguayan Primera División. It currently plays in the Primera División B Metropolitana, one of the three third-division leagues in the Paraguayan football league system.

== History ==
In 2015, River Plate were crowned champions on the División Intermedia and were promoted to the Primera División Paraguaya for the 2016 season.

== Divisions timeline ==
So far this century, the club has been in all 4 divisions of the local league system:

== Current squad ==
As of 20 December 2020

Note: Flags indicate national team as defined under FIFA eligibility rules; some limited exceptions apply. Players may hold more than one non-FIFA nationality.

No.	Pos.	Nation	Player
1	GK	ARG	Osvaldo Cabral
2	DF	PAR	Gustavo Giménez
3	MF	PAR	Francisco Parra
4	DF	PAR	Carlos Montiel
5	DF	PAR	Richard Salinas
6	DF	PAR	Mario Saldívar
7	MF	PAR	Silvio Torales
8	MF	PAR	Cristian Sosa
9	FW	PAR	Robin Ramírez
10	MF	PAR	Alberto Contrera
11	FW	PAR	Marco Prieto
12	GK	PAR	Armando Vera
13	DF	ARG	Matías Maidana
14	MF	PAR	Darío Cáceres (on loan from Lanús)
15	MF	PAR	Diego Barreto
16	MF	PAR	Ramón Rosa
17	MF	PAR	Marcelo González
18	DF	URU	Richard Fernández

No.	Pos.	Nation	Player
19	FW	PAR	Epifanio García
20	FW	PAR	Dionicio Pérez
21	MF	PAR	Juan Gauto
22	MF	ARG	Emiliano Agüero
23	DF	PAR	Rodrigo Alborno
24	DF	PAR	Nicolás Rojas
25	FW	PAR	Alexis Rojas
27	GK	PAR	Pablo Gavilán
28	FW	PAR	Walter Gaona
29	DF	COL	José Moreno
30	FW	ECU	Juan Anangonó
32	MF	PAR	Jorge Núñez
33	MF	PAR	Aldo Quiñónez
34	MF	PAR	Alex González
35	FW	PAR	Francisco Bareiro
39	DF	PAR	Jorge Paredes
—	DF	PAR	Rodrigo Vera
_	MF	PAR	Gianlucca Fatecha

== Notable players ==
To appear in this section a player must have either:

- Played at least 125 games for the club.
- Set a club record or won an individual award while at the club.
- Been part of a national team at any time.
- Played in the first division of any other football association (outside of Paraguay).
- Played in a continental and/or intercontinental competition.

- (Paraguay) Diego Florentín (1930)
- (Paraguay) Amadeo Ortega (1930)
- (Paraguay) José Cardozo (1988–1990)
- (Brazil) Andre Galiassi (2003–2004)
- (Argentina) Fernando Sanjurjo (2004)

Non-CONMEBOL players

- (Japan) Takuma Sugano (2002–2005)
- (Mexico) Alfredo Juraidini (2016)
- (South Korea) Hee-Mang Jang (2019–)

== Honours ==
=== National ===
- Paraguayan First Division
  - Runners-up (3): 1919, 1926, 1930
- Paraguayan Second Division
  - Winners (3): 1913, 1957, 2018
- Paraguayan Third Division
  - Winners (1): 2010
