= Estadio Gunther Vogel =

Football stadium in San Lorenzo, Paraguay

Coordinates: 25°20′34″S 57°30′03″W

Gunther Vogel
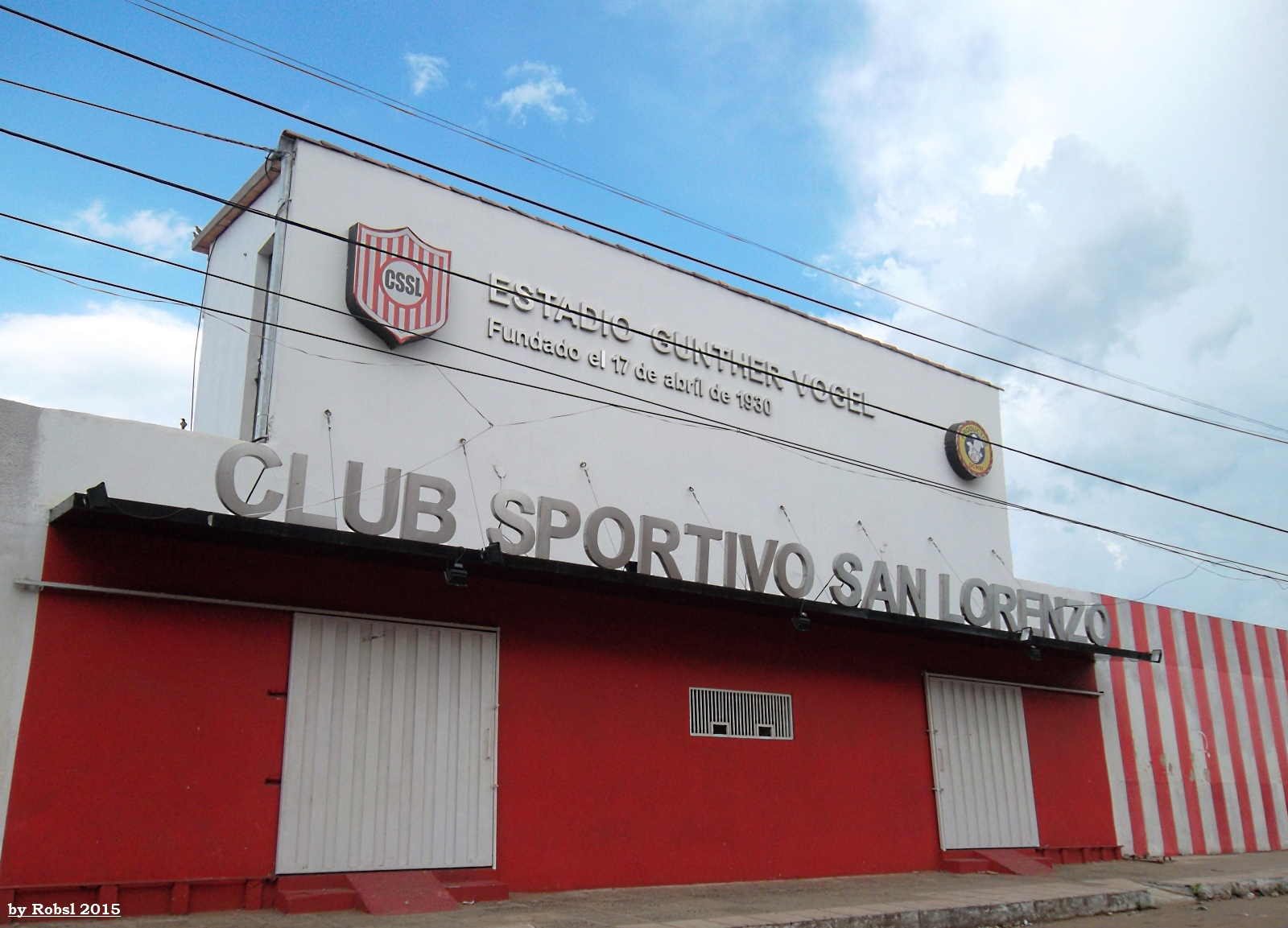
- Interactive map of Gunther Vogel
- Full name: Estadio Gunther Vogel
- Capacity: 5000
- Field size: 105 x 70 m

Construction
- Opened: 1940

Tenant
- Sportivo San Lorenzo

The Estadio Gunther Vogel is a football stadium in the city of San Lorenzo, Paraguay. It is the home venue of Club Sportivo San Lorenzo, it has a capacity of 5,000 spectators.

The stadium was known until 2011 as "Ciudad Universitaria".
