= Monumental Río Parapití =

Sports venue in Paraguay

Estadio Río Parapití
- Monumental
- Interactive map of Estadio Río Parapití
- Full name: Estadio Río Parapití
- Location: Pedro Juan Caballero, Paraguay
- Coordinates: 22°32′21″S 55°44′44″W
- Capacity: 25,000
- Field size: 100 x 66 m

Construction
- Opened: 1977

Tenant
- Club 2 de Mayo

Monumental Río Parapití is a multi-use stadium in the city of Pedro Juan Caballero, Paraguay, used mostly for football. It is the home venue of Club 2 de Mayo.

This stadium was used during the 1999 Copa América, hosting games between Paraguay and Peru and between Japan and Bolivia.

== See also ==
- List of association football stadiums by capacity
