= Club Martín Ledesma =

Paraguayan football club

Martín Ledesma
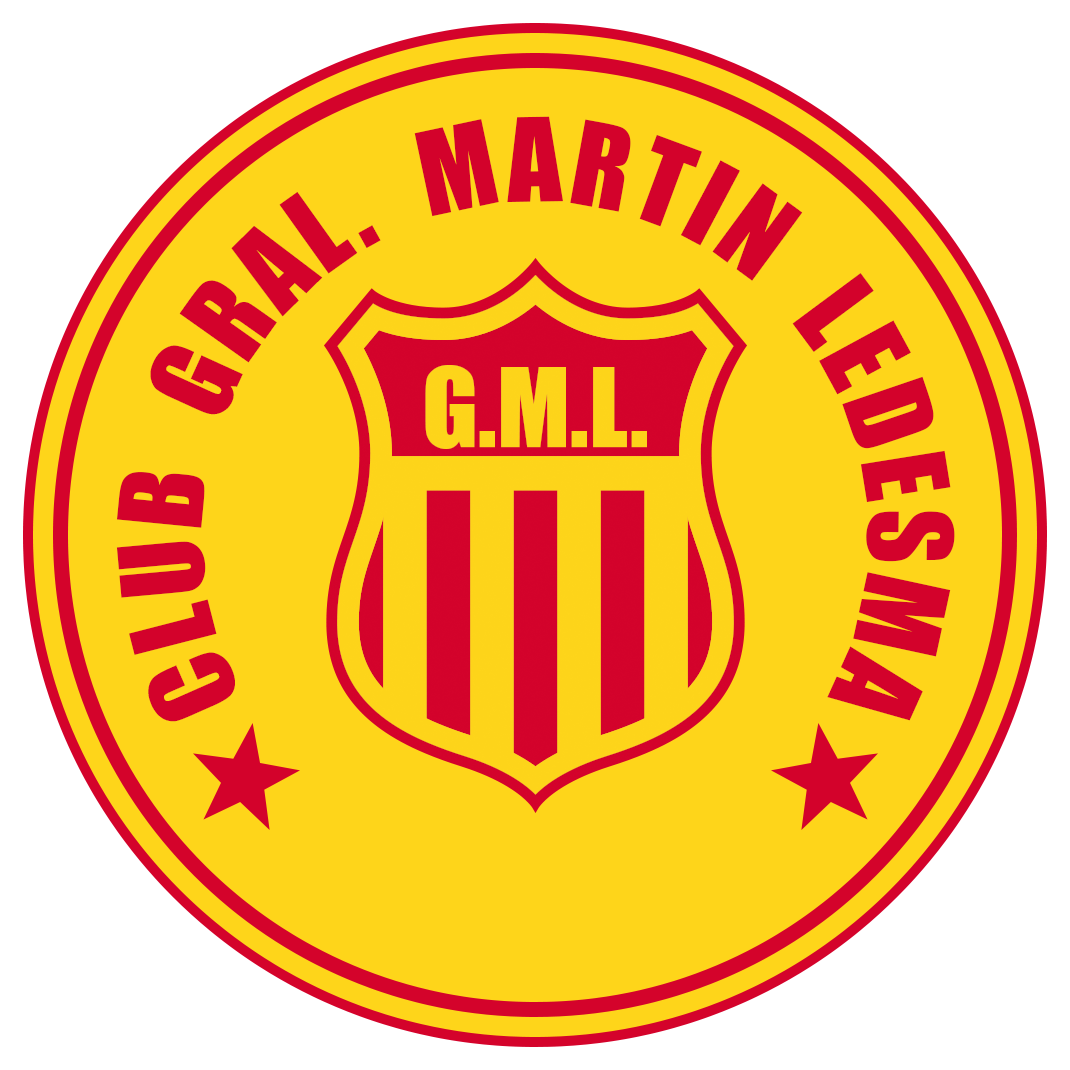
- Full name: Club General Martín Ledesma
- Nickname(s): El Decano Capiateño
- Founded: September 22, 1914
- Ground: Estadio Enrique Soler, Capiatá, Paraguay
- Capacity: 5,000
- Chairman: Riccardo Torresi
- League: Primera División B Metropolitana
- 2024: División Intermedia, 12th of 16 (relegated by average)
Home colours	Away colours

Club General Martín Ledesma, is a Paraguayan football club based in the city of Capiatá in the Central Department. The club was founded 22 September 1914 and plays in Primera División B Metropolitana, one of the third-tier leagues of the Paraguayan football league system. Their home games are played at the Estadio Enrique Soler.

== History ==
The club was founded on September 22, 1914 in the building of the Graduada Doble School under the supervision of the school director Mr. Enrique Soler. In the meeting, it was decided to create an institution to develop the practice of sports in the city of Capiatá and the name "General Martín Ledesma Football Club" was chosen for the institution in honor of the founder of the mentioned city, General Don Martín Ledesma de Balderrama.

The first ever board in 1914 consisted of:

- President: Mr. Juan R. Alcaraz
- Vice President: Mr. Juan B Salcedo
- Secretary: Mr. Venancio Trinidad
- Treasurer: Mr. Alberto Sanchez

Arsenio Ayala, José Sosa, José Emiliano Céspedes, Juan Cappa and José Arrúa were also members of the board.

== Honours ==
- Third División
  - Runner-up (2): 2012, 2021
- UFI Champions Cup
  - Winners (1): 2006
- Regional Titles (Capiatá league)
  - Winners (10): 1968, 1970, 1972, 1976, 1985, 1996, 1997, 1998, 1999, 2004
