= Club Sportivo Carapeguá =

Paraguayan football club

Sportivo Carapeguá
- Full name: Club Sportivo Carapeguá
- Nickname: El Potro
- Founded: 3 September 2010
- Ground: Estadio Municipal de Carapegua
- Capacity: 3,000
- Chairman: Ramon. G. Arce
- Head coach: Romualdo Agüero
- League: División Intermedia
- 2025: División Intermedia, 13th of 16
| Home colours | Away colours |

Club Sportivo Carapeguá, is a Paraguayan football club based in the city of Carapeguá in the Paraguarí Department. The club was founded on 3 September 2010 and plays in the División Intermedia.

The club played in the Paraguayan Primera División in 2012 and in 2013.

Their home games are played at the Estadio Teniente 1º Alcides González.

== Current squad 2012 ==
As of January 30, 2012. Note: Flags indicate national team as defined under FIFA eligibility rules; some limited exceptions apply. Players may hold more than one non-FIFA nationality.

| No. | Pos. | Nation | Player |
|---|---|---|---|
| - | GK | PAR | Darío Aranda |
| - | GK | PAR | Martín Aranda |
| - | GK | PAR | Gustavo Arévalos |
| - | GK | BRA | Fabiano Heves da Silva |
| - | GK | PAR | Wilson Daniel Quiñonez |
| - | DF | PAR | Jorge Barrios |
| - | DF | PAR | Marcos Arce |
| - | DF | PAR | Hugo Báez |
| - | DF | PAR | Julio Irrazábal |
| - | DF | PAR | Jorge Carrera |
| - | DF | PAR | Hugo Rafael Fleitas |
| - | DF | PAR | Aldo David Olmedo |
| - | DF | PAR | Alejandro Bernal |
| - | MF | PAR | Diosnel Almirón |
| - | MF | PAR | Diego Benítez |
| - | MF | PAR | Alejandro Brítez |
| - | MF | PAR | Michael Valenzuela |

| No. | Pos. | Nation | Player |
|---|---|---|---|
| - | MF | PAR | Jorge Alberto Cáceres |
| - | MF | PAR | Rodrigo Cantero |
| - | MF | PAR | Eduardo Echeverría |
| - | MF | PAR | Gerardo Escobar |
| - | MF | PAR | Ariel Frasqueri |
| - | MF | PAR | Cristian Martínez Medina |
| - | MF | PAR | Esteban Ramírez |
| - | MF | PAR | Aldo Silva |
| - | FW | PAR | Jorge Ayala |
| - | FW | PAR | Édgar Benítez |
| - | FW | ARG | Enrique Narvay |
| - | FW | PAR | Ever Barrientos |
| - | FW | PAR | Jorge Florentín |
| - | FW | PAR | Ricardo Javier Ortíz |
| - | FW | PAR | Israel Rodríguez |
| - | FW | PAR | Cristian Santa Cruz |

== Honours ==
- División Intermedia
  - Runner-up (1): 2011
- Primera División B Nacional
  - Winner (1): 2022

== Managers ==
- (Argentina) Miguel Ángel Zahzú (2012)
