= 2019 Copa Paraguay =

Tournament details
- Country: Paraguay
- Dates: 28 May – 5 December 2019
- Teams: 64

Final positions
- Champions: Libertad (1st title)
- Runners-up: Guaraní
- Third place: Deportivo Capiatá

Tournament statistics
- Matches played: 64
- Goals scored: 224 (3.5 per match)

The 2019 Copa Paraguay was the second edition of the Copa Paraguay, Paraguay's domestic football cup competition. The competition started on 28 May 2019 and concluded on 5 December 2019. Libertad won their first title in the competition by beating defending champions Guaraní in the final by a 3–0 score. With both champions Libertad and runners-up Guaraní being already qualified for the 2020 Copa Libertadores, and third-placed team Deportivo Capiatá being relegated at the end of the season, the berth to the 2020 Copa Sudamericana the winners were originally entitled to was transferred to the Primera División aggregate table eighth-placed team, Sportivo Luqueño.

== Format ==
For this edition, the competition was expanded from 48 to 64 teams, with the Primera B, Primera C, and UFI being entitled to more berths. Given the expansion, the competition did not feature any preliminary rounds for teams from the lower tiers and the 64 teams directly qualified for the first round. Ties in all rounds were played as a single game, with a penalty shootout deciding the winner in case of a draw.

== Teams ==
64 teams competed in this edition of the competition: the 12 Primera División and 16 División Intermedia teams, as well as 11 from the Primera B, 8 from the Primera C, and the 17 champions from each department of Paraguay representing the UFI.

=== Primera División ===
All of the 12 Primera División teams took part in the competition:

- Cerro Porteño
- Deportivo Capiatá
- Deportivo Santaní
- General Díaz
- Guaraní
- Libertad
- Nacional
- Olimpia
- River Plate
- Sol de América
- Sportivo Luqueño
- Sportivo San Lorenzo

=== División Intermedia ===
All of the 16 División Intermedia teams took part:

- 2 de Mayo
- 3 de Febrero (CDE)
- 12 de Octubre (I)
- Atyrá
- Deportivo Caaguazú
- Fernando de la Mora
- Fulgencio Yegros
- General Caballero (JLM)
- Guaireña
- Independiente (CG)
- Ovetense
- R.I. 3 Corrales
- Resistencia
- Rubio Ñu
- Sportivo Iteño
- Sportivo Trinidense

=== Primera B ===
The 9 teams ranked from 2nd to 10th place in the 2018 Primera B season and the top two in the 2018 Primera C season qualified:

- 3 de Febrero FBC
- Atlántida
- Colegiales
- Cristóbal Colón (JAS)
- Cristóbal Colón (Ñ)
- Presidente Hayes
- Recoleta
- Sportivo Ameliano
- Sportivo Limpeño
- Tacuary
- Tembetary

=== Primera C ===
Teams ranked from 3rd to 10th place in the previous Primera C season qualified:

- 1° de Marzo
- 12 de Octubre (SD)
- Atlético Juventud
- General Caballero (CG)
- Humaitá
- Oriental
- Silvio Pettirossi
- Sport Colonial

=== UFI ===
The champions from each of the 17 departments of Paraguay qualified for the competition:

- Sportivo San Juan (Concepción)
- Porvenir FC (San Pedro)
- Sport Valenzolano (Cordillera)
- 12 de Octubre (PY) (Guairá)
- Sol de América (P) (Caaguazú)
- 16 de Agosto (Caazapá)
- Athletic FBC (Itapúa)
- 19 de Marzo FBC (Misiones)
- Sud América (Paraguarí)
- SCD San Antonio (Alto Paraná)
- 3 de Mayo (Central)
- 1° de Marzo FBC (Ñeembucú)
- Aquidabán (Amambay)
- Sport Santo Domingo (Canindeyú)
- Independiente (N) (Presidente Hayes)
- Nueva Estrella (Boquerón)
- Sport Puerto Diana (Alto Paraguay)

== Round of 64 ==
The draw for the round of 64 was held on 16 May 2019 and the matches were played from 28 May to 25 July 2019.

28 May 2019	12 de Octubre (PY)	0–3	Sportivo Iteño	Villarrica
13:00		Report	Torres 64', 81'; Sanabria 85'	Stadium: Parque del Guairá; Referee: Marcos Galeano

28 May 2019	Humaitá	1–4	Guaireña	Villarrica
15:00	Arzamendia 21'	Report	Duarte 8', 65'; Delvalle 66'; Galeano 83'	Stadium: Parque del Guairá; Referee: David Ojeda

29 May 2019	Cristóbal Colón (Ñ)	3–0	Deportivo Caaguazú	Coronel Oviedo
13:00	Roa 18', 28'; Ev. Amarilla 72'	Report		Stadium: Ovetenses Unidos; Referee: Orlando Achucarro

29 May 2019	Sport Colonial	1–5	Ovetense	Coronel Oviedo
15:00	Cáceres 84'	Report	Mena 34', 75'; Aquino 57'; Benítez 73'; Ledesma 80'	Stadium: Ovetenses Unidos; Referee: Osmar Soto

30 May 2019	Sol de América (P)	16–3	Sport Puerto Diana	Itauguá
16:00	Ortiz 3', 5', 24', 26', 41', 42', 67'; Zorrila 9', 18'; Martínez 29', 37', 86'; Popp 47'; Portillo 49', 50'; Sosa 84'	Report	Barboza 16'; Paya 61' (pen.); Pérez 69'	Stadium: Luis Alberto Salinas; Referee: Juan Franco

30 May 2019	12 de Octubre (SD)	0–3	12 de Octubre (I)	Itauguá
18:15		Report	Ríos 35'; Villamayor 46'; Ovejero 87'	Stadium: Luis Alberto Salinas; Referee: Víctor Ruiz Díaz

4 June 2019	Oriental	2–2 (2–3 p)	Sportivo San Juan	Pedro Juan Caballero
14:00	Martínez 26' (pen.); D. González 85'	Report	Florenciañez 4' (pen.); Benítez 64'	Stadium: Río Parapití; Referee: Carmen Gómez
	Penalties
	C. González (penalty missed); Soler (penalty scored); Martínez (penalty scored); Aguilera (penalty missed); Alfaro (penalty missed)		(penalty scored) Mora; (penalty scored) Blanco; (penalty scored) Lovera; (penalty missed) Benítez

4 June 2019	Silvio Pettirossi	0–1	2 de Mayo	Pedro Juan Caballero
16:15		Report	Benítez 68' (o.g.)	Stadium: Río Parapití; Referee: Rodrigo Cubillas

6 June 2019	Tacuary	3–0	Resistencia	Asunción
19:00	Núñez 23'; Valdez 68'; Vidal 84'	Report		Stadium: Martín Torres; Referee: Nelson Palma

6 June 2019	Atlético Juventud	1–0	Sportivo Trinidense	Asunción
19:15	García 39'	Report		Stadium: Martín Torres; Referee: Gedidias Zacarías

11 June 2019	19 de Marzo FBC	1–1 (2–3 p)	General Caballero (CG)	Encarnación
13:00	Espinoza 90+6'	Report	López 40'	Stadium: 22 de Setiembre; Referee: Paulino de los Santos Palacios
	Penalties
	González (penalty scored); Báez (penalty scored); Fretes (penalty missed); Espinoza (penalty missed)		(penalty scored) López; (penalty scored) Da Silva; (penalty missed) Osmar; (penalty scored) González

11 June 2019	Colegiales	2–0	Athletic FBC	Encarnación
15:00	Zarza 59'; Coronel 64'	Report		Stadium: 22 de Setiembre; Referee: Nelson Alcaraz

12 June 2019	Nueva Estrella	1–9	3 de Febrero (CDE)	Villa Hayes
13:00	González 76'	Report	Chávez 5', 56'; Arce 26', 50'; Riveros 39'; Pereira 61', 64'; Arrúa 72'; González 80' (pen.)	Stadium: Isidro Roussillón; Referee: Zulma Quiñonez

12 June 2019	Independiente (N)	0–4	Rubio Ñu	Villa Hayes
15:00		Report	Pérez 32'; Garay 39'; Matta 86'; Peralta 87'	Stadium: Isidro Roussillón; Referee: Alberto Candia

13 June 2019	1° de Marzo FBC	1–2	Atyrá	Capiatá
17:00	Ayala 42' (pen.)	Report	Giménez 29'; Vera 85'	Stadium: Erico Galeano; Referee: Arnaldo Vergara

13 June 2019	3 de Mayo	1–3	R.I. 3 Corrales	Capiatá
19:15	Sánchez 64'	Report	Areco 26', 27'; Mareco 40'	Stadium: Erico Galeano; Referee: Fernando López

9 July 2019	Cristóbal Colón (JAS)	1–2	Fernando de la Mora	San Lorenzo
17:15	Mareco 45'	Report	Morales 71', 85'	Stadium: Gunther Vogel; Referee: Edgar Barrios
Note: The match was originally scheduled on 5 June at 17:00 in Asunción but was postponed in order to avoid a clash with a friendly game for the Paraguay national football team. It was rescheduled to 9 July at 17:15 in San Lorenzo.

9 July 2019	Sportivo Limpeño	0–4	Olimpia	Asunción
19:45		Report	Montenegro 23'; De la Cruz 24'; Ortega 52' (pen.); Candia 86'	Stadium: Manuel Ferreira; Referee: Sergio Melgarejo

10 July 2019	Sport Valenzolano	0–3	General Caballero (JLM)	Dr. Juan León Mallorquín
13:00		Report	Acuña 42'; Romero 55'; Brizuela 88'	Stadium: Leandro Ovelar; Referee: Paulino Palacios

10 July 2019	SCD San Antonio	2–8	Libertad	Dr. Juan León Mallorquín
15:00	Gamarra 45' (pen.); Sánchez 90'	Report	Sanabria 17'; Rivero 35'; Benítez 40'; H. Martínez 48'; Franco 54', 55'; A. Martínez 59'; Aquino 69'	Stadium: Leandro Ovelar; Referee: Sixto Mercado

11 July 2019	3 de Febrero FBC	0–3	Nacional	Itauguá
17:15		Report	González 20', 65', 87'	Stadium: Luis Alberto Salinas; Referee: David Ojeda

11 July 2019	16 de Agosto	0–6	Sportivo San Lorenzo	Itauguá
19:45		Report	Vargas 13', 14'; A. Fernández 22'; A. Cáceres 67'; Otazú 70'; Said 86'	Stadium: Luis Alberto Salinas; Referee: Víctor Robles

16 July 2019	Presidente Hayes	1–2	River Plate	Asunción
17:15	Noguera 3'	Report	Alfonso 80'; Ayala 85'	Stadium: Ricardo Gregor; Referee: Zulma Quiñónez

16 July 2019	1° de Marzo	0–3	Sportivo Luqueño	Asunción
19:45		Report	Salinas 67'; Fernández 70'; Moreira 73'	Stadium: Ricardo Gregor; Referee: Fernando López

17 July 2019	Porvenir FC	1–4	Sol de América	Itauguá
17:15	Sequeira 64'	Report	Viera 38'; Acuña 47'; Jourdan 58'; Cáceres 73'	Stadium: Luis Alberto Salinas; Referee: Augusto Alvarenga

17 July 2019	Atlántida	0–3	Cerro Porteño	Asunción
19:45		Report	Churín 66' (pen.); Cardozo 71'; Fariña 82' (pen.)	Stadium: General Pablo Rojas; Referee: Carlos Amarilla

18 July 2019	Sport Santo Domingo	0–5	General Díaz	San Estanislao
17:15		Report	Doldán 11', 21', 52'; Ríos 39'; Santa Cruz 62'	Stadium: Juan José Vázquez; Referee: César Herrera

18 July 2019	Sud América	0–5	Deportivo Santaní	San Estanislao
19:45		Report	Beltrán 18'; Litre 68', 89'; Gómez 90+2'; Pérez 90+3'	Stadium: Juan José Vázquez; Referee: Carmen Gómez

23 July 2019	Recoleta	1–3	Guaraní	Asunción
18:30	Petit 70'	Report	Contrera 5' (pen.); González 25'; Aquino 72'	Stadium: River Plate; Referee: Julio Ojeda

24 July 2019	Aquidabán	1–8	Deportivo Capiatá	Pedro Juan Caballero
16:00	Giménez 80'	Report	Menghi 15'; González 19'; Marabel 52'; Irrazábal 57'; Escobar 59', 81' (pen.), 86'; Salomón 89'	Stadium: Río Parapití; Referee: Gedidias Zacarías

25 July 2019	Sportivo Ameliano	3–0	Fulgencio Yegros	Asunción
15:00	Rojas 72', 80', 90+2'	Report		Stadium: Ricardo Gregor; Referee: Giancarlo Juliadoza

25 July 2019	Tembetary	2–0	Independiente (CG)	Asunción
18:30	Romero 73'; Martínez 75'	Report		Stadium: Ricardo Gregor; Referee: Sixto Mercado
Note: The match was originally scheduled on 5 June at 19:15 in Asunción but was postponed to a date after the 2019 Copa América in order to avoid a clash with a friendly game for the Paraguay national football team. It was rescheduled to 25 July at 18:30 in Asunción.

== Round of 32 ==
Matches in this round were played from 7 August to 3 September 2019.

7 August 2019	Cerro Porteño	1–1 (3–4 p)	2 de Mayo	San Estanislao
18:30	Saiz 4'	Report	Jara 89'	Stadium: Juan José Vázquez; Referee: Marco Franco
	Penalties
	Aguilar (penalty scored); Saiz (penalty scored); Acosta (penalty missed); Benítez (penalty scored); Fariña (penalty missed)		(penalty scored) Jara; (penalty scored) Mendoza; (penalty scored) Zárate; (penalty missed) Román; (penalty scored) Borjas

8 August 2019	Olimpia	3–0	Colegiales	Villarrica
15:00	Ovelar 25'; Torres 60'; Ortega 90+1'	Report		Stadium: Parque del Guairá; Referee: Alipio Colmán

13 August 2019	Guaireña	1–0	General Díaz	Villarrica
14:00	Verdún 38'	Report		Stadium: Parque del Guairá; Referee: Giancarlos Juliadoza

13 August 2019	Cristóbal Colón (Ñ)	1–1 (6–5 p)	Sportivo San Lorenzo	Itauguá
16:15	Duarte 50'	Report	Fernández 30'	Stadium: Luis Alberto Salinas; Referee: César Herebia
	Penalties
	Roa (penalty scored); Bareiro (penalty missed); Duarte (penalty scored); Lugo (penalty scored); Villalba (penalty scored); Palacios (penalty scored); Gómez (penalty scored)		(penalty scored) Ferreira; (penalty missed) Paredes; (penalty scored) Ariosa; (penalty scored) González; (penalty scored) Miño; (penalty scored) Román; (penalty missed) Reyes

13 August 2019	12 de Octubre (I)	0–0 (3–4 p)	Ovetense	Itauguá
18:30		Report		Stadium: Luis Alberto Salinas; Referee: Sergio Melgarejo
	Penalties
	Lesme (penalty scored); Ávalos (penalty missed); Ovejero (penalty scored); Barrientos (penalty missed); Presentado (penalty scored); Ríos (penalty missed)		(penalty scored) Irala; (penalty missed) Cochere; (penalty scored) Soloaga; (penalty scored) Rivero; (penalty missed) Hermosilla; (penalty scored) Ferreira

14 August 2019	Atlético Juventud	1–1 (1–4 p)	Sol de América (P)	Dr. Juan León Mallorquín
12:45	González 34'	Report	Carballo 63'	Stadium: Leandro Ovelar; Referee: Carmen Gómez
	Penalties
	Nicolicchia (penalty missed); Minseong (penalty missed); Peralta (penalty scored)		(penalty scored) Martínez; (penalty scored) Barrios; (penalty scored) Portillo; (penalty scored) Carballo

14 August 2019	General Caballero (JLM)	0–1	Guaraní	Dr. Juan León Mallorquín
15:00		Report	Aquino 89'	Stadium: Leandro Ovelar; Referee: Sixto Mercado

15 August 2019	Tembetary	1–2	Libertad	Villa Elisa
16:15	Martínez 28'	Report	Martínez 70'; Oviedo 87'	Stadium: Luis Alfonso Giagni; Referee: Carlos Benítez

15 August 2019	Sol de América	4–1	General Caballero (CG)	Villa Elisa
18:30	Cubilla 26'; Ruíz Díaz 38', 53'; Centurión 83'	Report	Velásquez 78'	Stadium: Luis Alfonso Giagni; Referee: Rodrigo Serafini

20 August 2019	Deportivo Santaní	2–1	Sportivo Ameliano	Asunción
16:15	Chamorro 57'; Leguizamón 89'	Report	Mazacote 9'	Stadium: La Arboleda; Referee: Carlos Amarilla

20 August 2019	Sportivo Luqueño	1–0	Rubio Ñu	Asunción
18:30	Domínguez 42'	Report		Stadium: La Arboleda; Referee: Julio Ojeda

21 August 2019	R.I. 3 Corrales	2–2 (2–3 p)	Nacional	Ciudad del Este
16:15	Pedrozo 8'; Agüero 85'	Report	Costa 11'; González 76'	Stadium: Antonio Aranda; Referee: Marco Franco
	Penalties
	Duarte (penalty scored); Del Valle (penalty missed); Pedrozo (penalty scored); Agüero (penalty missed); López (penalty missed)		(penalty missed) Rojas; (penalty scored) Cáceres; (penalty scored) Alegre; (penalty scored) Paniagua

22 August 2019	Tacuary	0–3	Fernando de la Mora	Atyrá
12:45		Report	Báez 49', 72'; Quintana 90+1'	Stadium: San Francisco de Asís; Referee: Zulma Quiñonez

22 August 2019	Sportivo Iteño	1–1 (2–3 p)	Atyrá	Atyrá
15:00	Vera 67'	Report	Fraquelli 11'	Stadium: San Francisco de Asís; Referee: Fernando López
	Penalties
	Martínez (penalty scored); Laxague (penalty scored); Oviedo (penalty missed); Silguero (penalty missed); Bobadilla (penalty missed)		(penalty scored) Martínez; (penalty scored) Ferreira; (penalty missed) Romero; (penalty scored) Maidana; (penalty missed) Chaparro

28 August 2019	3 de Febrero (CDE)	1–1 (3–5 p)	River Plate	Ciudad del Este
16:00	Villalba 50'	Report	Ayala 41'	Stadium: Antonio Aranda; Referee: David Ojeda
	Penalties
	Sanabria (penalty scored); González (penalty scored); Mareco (penalty missed); Brizuela (penalty scored)		(penalty scored) Ayala; (penalty scored) Requena; (penalty scored) Gauto; (penalty scored) Almada; (penalty scored) Prieto

3 September 2019	Deportivo Capiatá	5–1	Sportivo San Juan	San Estanislao
17:00	Irrazábal 7'; Agüero 12'; Acosta 40'; Roa 69'; Escobar 84'	Report	Blanco 64'	Stadium: Juan José Vázquez; Referee: Marco Franco

== Bracket ==
Round of 16
2 de Mayo	1 (3)
Guaireña (p)	1 (4)
Atyrá	0
Sol de América	2
Libertad	3
Fernando de la Mora	2
Sportivo Luqueño	2
Nacional	0
Olimpia	0 (4)
Cristóbal Colón (Ñ) (p)	0 (5)
Ovetense	0
Deportivo Capiatá	1
Guaraní	5
Sol de América (P)	0
Deportivo Santaní	1
River Plate	0

Quarterfinals
Guaireña	0 (1)
Sol de América (p)	0 (3)
Libertad	1
Sportivo Luqueño	0
Cristóbal Colón (Ñ)	1
Deportivo Capiatá	3
Guaraní	2
Deportivo Santaní	1

Semifinals
Sol de América	1
Libertad	4
Deportivo Capiatá	1
Guaraní	5

Final
Libertad	3
Guaraní	0
Third place play-off
Sol de América	0 (5)
Deportivo Capiatá (p)	0 (6)

== Round of 16 ==
Matches in this round were played from 10 to 19 September 2019.

10 September 2019	2 de Mayo	1–1 (3–4 p)	Guaireña	Pedro Juan Caballero
16:30	Araujo 60'	Report	Acosta 5'	Stadium: Río Parapití; Referee: Gedidías Zacarías
	Penalties
	Aranda (penalty scored); Mendoza (penalty missed); Franco (penalty scored); Escobar (penalty scored); Borjas (penalty missed); Vázquez (penalty missed)		(penalty scored) Ortigoza; (penalty scored) Claridge; (penalty scored) Colmán; (penalty missed) Acosta; (penalty missed) Galeano; (penalty scored) Aguilar

10 September 2019	Sportivo Luqueño	2–0	Nacional	Villa Elisa
18:45	Ibarra 2'; Marín 90+2'	Report		Stadium: Luis Alfonso Giagni; Referee: Giancarlo Juliadoza

11 September 2019	Libertad	3–2	Fernando de la Mora	Asunción
16:30	Oviedo 19'; Martínez 21'; Bogarín 76'	Report	Lugo 5'; Morales 88'	Stadium: Arsenio Erico; Referee: Marco Franco

11 September 2019	Olimpia	0–0 (4–5 p)	Cristóbal Colón (Ñ)	Capiatá
18:45		Report		Stadium: Erico Galeano; Referee: David Ojeda
	Penalties
	Viudez (penalty scored); Fernández (penalty scored); Ovelar (penalty scored); De la Cruz (penalty missed); Montenegro (penalty scored)		(penalty scored) Villagra; (penalty scored) Palacios; (penalty scored) Duarte; (penalty scored) Gómez; (penalty scored) Lugo

12 September 2019	Ovetense	0–1	Deportivo Capiatá	Asunción
18:45		Report	Roa 54'	Stadium: River Plate; Referee: Sixto Mercado

17 September 2019	Deportivo Santaní	1–0	River Plate	San Estanislao
16:30	Giménez 40'	Report		Stadium: Juan José Vázquez; Referee: Giancarlo Juliadoza

18 September 2019	Guaraní	5–0	Sol de América (P)	Itauguá
18:45	Ortigoza 3', 88'; R. Fernández 18'; Florentín 67'; Aquino 76'	Report		Stadium: Luis Alberto Salinas; Referee: Carlos Benítez

19 September 2019	Atyrá	0–2	Sol de América	Luque
18:45		Report	Pardo 5'; Viera 17'	Stadium: General Adrián Jara; Referee: Julio Ojeda

== Quarterfinals ==
Matches in this round were played from 9 to 16 October 2019.

9 October 2019	Guaireña	0–0 (1–3 p)	Sol de América	Villarrica
16:30		Report		Stadium: Parque del Guairá; Referee: Giancarlo Juliadoza
	Penalties
	Fernández (penalty scored); Claridge (penalty missed); Ortigoza (penalty missed); Valiente (penalty missed)		(penalty missed) Colombini; (penalty scored) Mendoza; (penalty scored) Rojas; (penalty scored) Pardo

10 October 2019	Libertad	1–0	Sportivo Luqueño	Asunción
20:00	Martínez 72'	Report		Stadium: Arsenio Erico; Referee: Alipio Colmán

16 October 2019	Cristóbal Colón (Ñ)	1–3	Deportivo Capiatá	Itauguá
17:45	Roa 12'	Report	Cáceres 35'; Martínez 90+1'; Acosta 90+5'	Stadium: Luis Alberto Salinas; Referee: Juan López

16 October 2019	Guaraní	2–1	Deportivo Santaní	Villa Elisa
20:00	Ortigoza 50'; Lopes 89'	Report	Díaz 39'	Stadium: Luis Alfonso Giagni; Referee: Juan Benítez

== Semifinals ==
The semifinals were played on 5 and 6 November 2019.

5 November 2019	Sol de América	1–4	Libertad	Asunción
19:30	Ferreira 65'	Report	Cardozo 30'; Martínez 32'; Sanabria 37'; Franco 60'	Stadium: Arsenio Erico; Referee: Juan López

6 November 2019	Deportivo Capiatá	1–5	Guaraní	Villa Elisa
19:30	Aguada 55'	Report	Redes 27'; Ortigoza 33'; Florentín 40'; Aquino 49'; F. Fernández 90+3'	Stadium: Luis Alfonso Giagni; Referee: Julio Quintana

== Final ==
4 December 2019
19:00

Libertad	3–0	Guaraní
Martínez 41', 51'; Bareiro 66'	Report

Estadio Defensores del Chaco, Asunción
Referee: Éber Aquino

== Third place play-off ==
5 December 2019
19:00

Sol de América	0–0	Deportivo Capiatá
	Report
Penalties
Mendoza (penalty missed); Viera (penalty scored); Pardo (penalty scored); Jourdan (penalty scored); Centurión (penalty scored); Villalba (penalty scored); Fredes (penalty missed)	5–6	(penalty missed) Irrazábal; (penalty scored) Sosa; (penalty scored) Cáceres; (penalty scored) Marabel; (penalty scored) Martínez; (penalty scored) Vergara; (penalty scored) Fernández

Estadio Luis Alberto Salinas, Itauguá
Referee: Carlos Amarilla
