= 2018 Copa Paraguay =

Tournament details
- Country: Paraguay
- Dates: 12 April – 5 December 2018
- Teams: 205 (Preliminary stage); 48 (National stage)

Final positions
- Champions: Guaraní (1st title)
- Runners-up: Olimpia
- Third place: Sportivo Luqueño
- Copa Sudamericana: Guaraní

The 2018 Copa Paraguay was the first edition of the Copa Paraguay, Paraguay's domestic football cup competition. The competition ended with Guaraní winning their first title after beating Olimpia 5–3 on penalties in the final following a 2–2 draw. Guaraní, as the winners, were awarded a berth into the 2019 Copa Sudamericana.

== Preliminary stage ==
The preliminary stage was played by teams from the Primera B, Primera C, and the UFI. 7 Primera B teams, 6 Primera C teams, and 7 teams from the UFI qualified for the national stage, for a total of 20 teams.

=== Primera B ===
The 17 teams were divided into two groups of four teams each and three groups of three teams. The winners of each group, as well as the two best second-placed teams qualified for the national stage.

==== Group A ====
Pos	Team	Pld	W	D	L	GF	GA	GD	Pts	Qualification
1	Tacuary	3	2	1	0	8	2	+6	7	Advance to National stage
2	Capitán Figari	3	2	0	1	6	7	−1	6	
3	Sportivo Ameliano	3	1	1	1	3	4	−1	4	
4	29 de Setiembre	3	0	0	3	5	9	−4	0	

Source: FUTPARAGUAY
Rules for classification: 1) Points, 2) Goal difference, 3) Goals for, 4) Drawing of lots.

12 April 2018	Tacuary	4–2	29 de Setiembre	Asunción
16:45	Benítez 24'; Franco 60', 74' (pen.), 86'	Report	Jara 29'; Ocampos 42'	Stadium: Arsenio Erico; Referee: Marco Franco

17 April 2018	Sportivo Ameliano	1–3	Capitán Figari	Asunción
19:00	Galeano 45'	Report	Ortíz 25'; Cáceres 66'; Ortega 85'	Stadium: Martín Torres; Referee: Rodrigo Serafini

9 May 2018	Tacuary	4–0	Capitán Figari	Asunción
15:00	Valdez 10'; Franco 21'; Perruchino 52'; Alvarenga 84'	Report		Stadium: Jardines del Kelito; Referee: Mario Alfonzo

10 May 2018	29 de Setiembre	1–2	Sportivo Ameliano	Asunción
15:00	Pessolani 7'	Report	Duarte 61', 66'	Stadium: Colegialito; Referee: César Rolón

6 June 2018	Tacuary	0–0	Sportivo Ameliano	Asunción
19:00		Report		Stadium: La Arboleda; Referee: Gedidias Zacarías

6 June 2018	29 de Setiembre	2–3	Capitán Figari	Asunción
19:00	Merlo 8'; Franco 76' (pen.)	Report	Velásquez 28'; Ortega 57' (pen.); Ortíz 80'	Stadium: Martín Torres; Referee: Pedro Echeverría

==== Group B ====
Pos	Team	Pld	W	D	L	GF	GA	GD	Pts	Qualification
1	24 de Setiembre (VP)	3	2	1	0	10	4	+6	7	Advance to National stage
2	Atlántida	3	1	2	0	7	3	+4	5	
3	3 de Febrero FBC	3	0	2	1	2	3	−1	2	
4	Presidente Hayes	3	0	1	2	1	10	−9	1	

Source: FUTPARAGUAY
Rules for classification: 1) Points, 2) Goal difference, 3) Goals for, 4) Drawing of lots.

12 April 2018	Atlántida	4–0	Presidente Hayes	Asunción
19:00	Brambilla 30'; Ortíz 74' (pen.); Galeano 82'; Brizuela 90+2'	Report		Stadium: Arsenio Erico; Referee: Juan López

18 April 2018	3 de Febrero FBC	1–2	24 de Setiembre (VP)	Luque
19:00	Cane 44'	Report	Morán 71' (pen.), 88'	Stadium: General Adrián Jara; Referee: Derlis López

9 May 2018	3 de Febrero FBC	0–0	Atlántida	Asunción
15:00		Report		Stadium: Colegialito; Referee: Juan Mendoza

24 May 2018	Presidente Hayes	0–5	24 de Setiembre (VP)	Asunción
19:00		Report	Verón 5' (pen.); González 8'; Rojas 53', 59', 70'	Stadium: Martín Torres; Referee: Dionisio Cristaldo

6 June 2018	3 de Febrero FBC	1–1	Presidente Hayes	Asunción
16:45	Valdovinos 26'	Report	Benítez 20'	Stadium: Martín Torres; Referee: Héctor Bernal

13 June 2018	24 de Setiembre (VP)	3–3	Atlántida	Asunción
15:00	Benítez 69'; Rojas 80', 90+5'	Report	Pérez 5' (pen.); Brizuela 36'; Cáceres 50'	Stadium: Roque Battilana; Referee: Pedro Echeverría

==== Group C ====
Pos	Team	Pld	W	D	L	GF	GA	GD	Pts	Qualification
1	12 de Octubre (I)	2	2	0	0	4	2	+2	6	Advance to National stage
2	Pilcomayo	2	1	0	1	3	2	+1	3	Advance to National stage
3	3 de Noviembre	2	0	0	2	1	4	−3	0	

Source: FUTPARAGUAY
Rules for classification: 1) Points, 2) Goal difference, 3) Goals for, 4) Drawing of lots.

2 May 2018	Pilcomayo	1–2	12 de Octubre (I)	Asunción
16:45	Guerrero 80' (pen.)	Report	Bernal 52'; Núñez 88'	Stadium: Ricardo Gregor; Referee: Mario Alfonzo

24 May 2018	12 de Octubre (I)	2–1	3 de Noviembre	Asunción
16:45	Paredes 55' (pen.); González 68'	Report	Sánchez 90+1'	Stadium: Martín Torres; Referee: Óscar Amarilla

6 June 2018	3 de Noviembre	0–2	Pilcomayo	Asunción
16:45		Report	Ortellado 31'; González 38'	Stadium: La Arboleda; Referee: Carlos Benítez

==== Group D ====
Pos	Team	Pld	W	D	L	GF	GA	GD	Pts	Qualification
1	Cristóbal Colón (JAS)	2	1	1	0	4	1	+3	4	Advance to National stage
2	Colegiales	2	1	1	0	5	3	+2	4	Advance to National stage
3	Olimpia de Itá	2	0	0	2	2	7	−5	0	

Source: FUTPARAGUAY
Rules for classification: 1) Points, 2) Goal difference, 3) Goals for, 4) Drawing of lots.

17 April 2018	Olimpia de Itá	2–4	Colegiales	Asunción
16:45	Zarza 14'; Roldán 80' (pen.)	Report	Sarquis 31', 72'; Sosa 56'; Enciso 60'	Stadium: Martín Torres; Referee: Marco Galeano

22 May 2018	Colegiales	1–1	Cristóbal Colón (JAS)	San Lorenzo
19:00	Sarquis 62'	Report	Paredes 82'	Stadium: Gunther Vogel; Referee: Cinthia Franco

12 June 2018	Cristóbal Colón (JAS)	3–0	Olimpia de Itá	Asunción
16:45	Ricardo 65', 83'; Ojeda 90+2'	Report		Stadium: Martín Torres; Referee: Dionisio Cristaldo

==== Group E ====
Pos	Team	Pld	W	D	L	GF	GA	GD	Pts	Qualification
1	Recoleta	2	2	0	0	3	1	+2	6	Advance to National stage
2	Dr. Benjamín Aceval	2	0	1	1	2	3	−1	1	
3	Cristóbal Colón (Ñ)	2	0	1	1	1	2	−1	1	

Source: FUTPARAGUAY
Rules for classification: 1) Points, 2) Goal difference, 3) Goals for, 4) Drawing of lots.

18 April 2018	Cristóbal Colón (Ñ)	1–1	Dr. Benjamín Aceval	Asunción
15:30	Rodríguez 90+2'	Report	González 69'	Stadium: Jardines del Kelito; Referee: Juan Mendoza

2 May 2018	Dr. Benjamín Aceval	1–2	Recoleta	Asunción
19:00	Llerena 75'	Report	Rodríguez 40'; Costa 69'	Stadium: Ricardo Gregor; Referee: Dionisio Cristaldo

12 June 2018	Recoleta	1–0	Cristóbal Colón (Ñ)	Asunción
19:00	Medina 81'	Report		Stadium: Martín Torres; Referee: Marcos Galeano

==== Ranking of second-placed teams ====
The two best teams among those ranked second qualified for the national stage. For teams in groups A and B, the matches against the fourth-placed team were not considered in this table.

Pos	Grp	Team	Pld	W	D	L	GF	GA	GD	Pts	Result
1	D	Colegiales	2	1	1	0	5	3	+2	4	National stage
2	C	Pilcomayo	2	1	0	1	3	2	+1	3	National stage
3	A	Capitán Figari	2	1	0	1	3	5	−2	3	
4	B	Atlántida	2	0	2	0	3	3	0	2	
5	E	Dr. Benjamín Aceval	2	0	1	1	2	3	−1	1	

Source: APF
Rules for classification: 1) Points, 2) Goal difference, 3) Goals for, 4) Drawing of lots.

=== Primera C ===
The 13 teams were divided into three groups of three teams each and one group of four teams. The winners of each group, as well as the two best second-placed teams qualified for the national stage.

==== Group A ====
Pos	Team	Pld	W	D	L	GF	GA	GD	Pts	Qualification
1	Atlético Juventud	2	2	0	0	5	0	+5	6	Advance to National stage
2	Tembetary	2	0	1	1	0	1	−1	1	
3	Sport Colonial	2	0	1	1	0	4	−4	1	
4	Cerro Corá	0	0	0	0	0	0	0	0	Excluded from the competition (Note: Cerro Corá was excluded from the competition as it failed to obtain a license.)

Source: FUTPARAGUAY
Rules for classification: 1) Points, 2) Goal difference, 3) Goals for, 4) Drawing of lots.
Notes:

Cerro Corá	Cancelled	Atlético Juventud

24 April 2018	Sport Colonial	0–0	Tembetary	San Lorenzo
19:00		Report		Stadium: Gunther Vogel; Referee: Héctor Bernal

8 May 2018	Atlético Juventud	4–0	Sport Colonial	Asunción
16:45	Britos 16'; Ávalos 40'; López 53'; Morínigo 88'	Report		Stadium: Martín Torres; Referee: Carlos Benítez

Cerro Corá	Cancelled	Tembetary

Sport Colonial	Cancelled	Cerro Corá

7 June 2018	Tembetary	0–1	Atlético Juventud	Asunción
16:45		Report	Guerrero 53'	Stadium: Arsenio Erico; Referee: Zulma Quiñónez

==== Group B ====
Pos	Team	Pld	W	D	L	GF	GA	GD	Pts	Qualification
1	General Caballero (CG)	2	2	0	0	4	1	+3	6	Advance to National stage
2	Deportivo Pinozá	2	1	0	1	4	5	−1	3	
3	Silvio Pettirossi	2	0	0	2	2	4	−2	0	

Source: FUTPARAGUAY
Rules for classification: 1) Points, 2) Goal difference, 3) Goals for, 4) Drawing of lots.

24 April 2018	Deportivo Pinozá	1–3	General Caballero (CG)	San Lorenzo
16:45	Mora 69'	Report	Ozuna 17'; Ardian 46', 71'	Stadium: Gunther Vogel; Referee: Gedidias Zacarías

8 May 2018	General Caballero (CG)	1–0	Silvio Pettirossi	Asunción
19:00	Ardian 20'	Report		Stadium: Martín Torres; Referee: Pedro Echeverría

5 June 2018	Silvio Pettirossi	2–3	Deportivo Pinozá	Asunción
15:00	Tillería 77' (pen.); Benítez 86'	Report	Arrúa 53'; Medina 72' (pen.); Morínigo 90+4'	Stadium: Coronel Félix Cabrera; Referee: Marco Franco

==== Group C ====
Pos	Team	Pld	W	D	L	GF	GA	GD	Pts	Qualification
1	Oriental	2	2	0	0	4	0	+4	6	Advance to National stage
2	Humaitá	2	1	0	1	1	1	0	3	Advance to National stage
3	12 de Octubre (SD)	0	0	0	0	0	0	0	0	Excluded from the competition (Note: 12 de Octubre (SD) was excluded from the competition for having fielded irregularly 3 players in its match against Humaitá.)

Source: FUTPARAGUAY
Rules for classification: 1) Points, 2) Goal difference, 3) Goals for, 4) Drawing of lots.
Notes:

25 April 2018	12 de Octubre (SD)	0–1; Awarded	Humaitá	Asunción
19:00	Jara 55' (pen.); Palma 86'	Report	Cáceres 3'	Stadium: La Arboleda; Referee: Juan Mendoza
Note: The match originally ended with a 2–1 win for 12 de Octubre (SD), but was awarded to Humaitá after a protest from the latter which also derived into the exclusion of the former team. The APF later clarified that the goal scored by Humaitá would still be counted to the effects of goal difference per team, leaving the final score of the match at 0–1.

22 May 2018	Humaitá	0–1	Oriental	San Lorenzo
16:45		Report	Casco 39'	Stadium: Gunther Vogel; Referee: Marcos Galeano

Oriental	3–0; Awarded	12 de Octubre (SD)

==== Group D ====
Pos	Team	Pld	W	D	L	GF	GA	GD	Pts	Qualification
1	Sportivo Limpeño	2	1	1	0	6	4	+2	4	Advance to National stage
2	1° de Marzo	2	1	0	1	5	5	0	3	Advance to National stage
3	Valois Rivarola	2	0	1	1	3	5	−2	1	

Source: FUTPARAGUAY
Rules for classification: 1) Points, 2) Goal difference, 3) Goals for, 4) Drawing of lots.

25 April 2018	1° de Marzo	2–4	Sportivo Limpeño	Asunción
16:45	González 25' (pen.); Villalba 78'	Report	Cardozo 19'; Caballero 41'; Sánchez 64', 69'	Stadium: La Arboleda; Referee: Rodrigo Serafini

23 May 2018	Sportivo Limpeño	2–2	Valois Rivarola	Asunción
15:00	Ríos 50', 66'	Report	Morán 11' (pen.); Patiño 26'	Stadium: Jardines del Kelito; Referee: César Rolón

7 June 2018	Valois Rivarola	1–3	1° de Marzo	Asunción
19:00	González 56'	Report	Cornet 5', 61'; Fernández 90+2'	Stadium: Arsenio Erico; Referee: César Rolón

==== Ranking of second-placed teams ====
The two best teams among those ranked second qualified for the national stage.

Pos	Grp	Team	Pld	W	D	L	GF	GA	GD	Pts	Result
1	D	1° de Marzo	2	1	0	1	5	5	0	3	National stage
2	C	Humaitá	2	1	0	1	1	1	0	3	National stage
3	B	Deportivo Pinozá	2	1	0	1	4	5	−1	3	
4	A	Tembetary	2	0	1	1	0	1	−1	1	

Source: APF
Rules for classification: 1) Points, 2) Goal difference, 3) Goals for, 4) Drawing of lots.

=== UFI ===
Teams competing in the UFI preliminaries were divided into seven zones grouping the departments of Paraguay, with each department having one participating team (two or three departments per zone). The winners of each zone qualified for the national stage.

==== Zona 1 ====
This zone included teams from the departments of Concepción, Amambay and Canindeyú.

Pos	Team	Pld	W	D	L	GF	GA	GD	Pts	Qualification
1	Independiente (PJC)	2	2	0	0	5	1	+4	6	Advance to National stage
2	Sport Construcción	2	1	0	1	6	4	+2	3	
3	Sportivo 1° de Mayo	2	0	0	2	2	8	−6	0	

Source: FUTPARAGUAY
Rules for classification: If two teams are tied: 1) Points, 2) Playoff game.
If all teams are tied: 1) Points, 2) Goal difference, 3) Penalty shootout, 4) Drawing of lots.

29 April 2018	Sport Construcción	0–3	Independiente (PJC)	Salto del Guairá
15:15				Stadium: El Gigante de Arroyito

6 May 2018	Sportivo 1° de Mayo	1–6	Sport Construcción	Yby Yaú
15:15				Stadium: Herculano Bazán

13 May 2018	Independiente (PJC)	2–1	Sportivo 1° de Mayo	Pedro Juan Caballero
15:15				Stadium: La Caldera del Diablo

==== Zona 2 ====
This zone included teams from the departments of Presidente Hayes, Boquerón and Alto Paraguay.

Pos	Team	Pld	W	D	L	GF	GA	GD	Pts	Qualification
1	Deportivo Alto Paraguay	2	1	1	0	5	4	+1	4	Advance to National stage
2	Real Chaco	2	0	2	0	4	4	0	2	
3	Sportivo Puerto Elsa	2	0	1	1	2	3	−1	1	

Source: FUTPARAGUAY
Rules for classification: If two teams are tied: 1) Points, 2) Playoff game.
If all teams are tied: 1) Points, 2) Goal difference, 3) Penalty shootout, 4) Drawing of lots.

29 April 2018	Sportivo Puerto Elsa	1–1	Real Chaco	Nanawa
15:15				Stadium: San Agustín

27 May 2018	Deportivo Alto Paraguay	2–1	Sportivo Puerto Elsa	Fuerte Olimpo
15:15				Stadium: Fortunato Villalba

13 June 2018	Real Chaco	3–3	Deportivo Alto Paraguay	Filadelfia
15:15				Stadium: Deportivo Fernheim

==== Zona 3 ====
This zone included teams from the departments of Cordillera and San Pedro.

29 April 2018	4 de Mayo	2–0	Cerro Corá (E)	Capiíbary
15:15				Stadium: 4 de Mayo

6 May 2018	Cerro Corá (E)	2–0	4 de Mayo	Emboscada
15:15				Stadium: Cerro Corá

13 May 2018	4 de Mayo	1–0	Cerro Corá (E)	Coronel Oviedo
15:00				Stadium: 12 de Junio

==== Zona 4 ====
This zone included teams from the departments of Guairá and Paraguarí.

29 April 2018	Sud América	0–2	Sport Capellán	Paraguarí
15:15				Stadium: Juan Ramón González

6 May 2018	Sport Capellán	2–3	Sud América	Tebicuary
15:15				Stadium: Liga Azucarera

13 May 2018	Sud América	2–1	Sport Capellán	Caacupé
15:00				Stadium: Teniente Fariña

==== Zona 5 ====
This zone included teams from the departments of Alto Paraná and Caaguazú.

29 April 2018	Atlético 13 de Junio	7–0	4 de Agosto	Ciudad del Este
15:15				Stadium: Atlético 13 de Junio

6 May 2018	4 de Agosto	0–6	Atlético 13 de Junio	José Domingo Ocampos
15:15				Stadium: 4 de Agosto

==== Zona 6 ====
This zone included teams from the departments of Central, Ñeembucú and Misiones.

Pos	Team	Pld	W	D	L	GF	GA	GD	Pts	Qualification
1	Teniente Fariña	2	1	1	0	2	1	+1	4	Advance to National stage
2	Capitán Bado	2	0	2	0	0	0	0	2	
3	15 de Mayo	2	0	1	1	1	2	−1	1	

Source: FUTPARAGUAY
Rules for classification: If two teams are tied: 1) Points, 2) Playoff game.
If all teams are tied: 1) Points, 2) Goal difference, 3) Penalty shootout, 4) Drawing of lots.

29 April 2018	15 de Mayo	1–2	Teniente Fariña	San Ignacio
15:15				Stadium: Atl. Capitán Alfonso del Puerto

6 May 2018	Capitán Bado	0–0	15 de Mayo	Pilar
15:15				Stadium: Emilio Sisul

13 May 2018	Teniente Fariña	0–0	Capitán Bado	Guarambaré
15:15				Stadium: Alicio Molina

==== Zona 7 ====
This zone included teams from the departments of Itapúa and Caazapá.

29 April 2018	16 de Mayo	1–2	Athletic Club	San Juan Nepomuceno
15:15				Stadium: Arq. Víctor González Acosta

6 May 2018	Athletic Club	5–0	16 de Mayo	Encarnación
15:15				Stadium: Jardines de San Isidro

== National stage ==
=== First round ===
The draw for the first round of the national stage involved the 20 teams which qualified from the preliminary stage, as well as the 12 Primera División teams and the 16 División Intermedia teams, which entered the competition at this stage. The 48 teams were drawn into 24 ties to be played as a single game, with a penalty shootout deciding the winner in case of a tie. The 24 winners will advance to the second round. The draw for the first round was held on 29 June 2018 and the matches were played from 24 July to 5 September 2018.

24 July 2018	Cristóbal Colón (JAS)	1–3	Cerro Porteño	Capiatá
19:15	Ricardo 19'	Report	Haedo Valdez 11'; Oviedo 27'; Novick 42'	Stadium: Erico Galeano; Referee: Marcos Galeano

25 July 2018	Athletic Club	1–2	R.I. 3 Corrales	Encarnación
14:45	Samudio 57'	Report	Cañete 73'; Portillo 87'	Stadium: 22 de Setiembre; Referee: Enrique Cáceres

25 July 2018	24 de Setiembre (VP)	0–2	Olimpia	Asunción
19:30		Report	Cardozo 45'; Ortega 76'	Stadium: Defensores del Chaco; Referee: Jorge Mercado

26 July 2018	Fernando de la Mora	2–0	Sportivo Iteño	Villa Elisa
16:45	Coronel 29'; Insfrán 77'	Report		Stadium: Luis Alfonso Giagni; Referee: Víctor Ruiz Díaz

26 July 2018	Recoleta	0–4	Sportivo Luqueño	Villa Elisa
19:15		Report	Bareiro 15', 18'; Benítez 29'; Leguizamón 36'	Stadium: Luis Alfonso Giagni; Referee: Héctor Bernal

31 July 2018	Humaitá	0–4	General Caballero (ZC)	Luque
16:45		Report	Centurión 33'; Saldívar 45'; Ramírez 65'; Duarte 75'	Stadium: General Adrián Jara; Referee: Marco Franco

31 July 2018	Sud América	0–1	Libertad	Luque
19:15		Report	Alfonso 87'	Stadium: General Adrián Jara; Referee: Dionisio Cristaldo

2 August 2018	4 de Mayo	3–4	Resistencia	San Estanislao
16:45	Chávez 26'; González 62'; Ocampos 86' (pen.)	Report	Chamorro 10'; Villasboa 18'; Pérez 23'; Perozo 31' (pen.)	Stadium: Juan José Vázquez; Referee: Juan López

2 August 2018	Martín Ledesma	0–0 (3–4 p)	Deportivo Santaní	San Estanislao
19:15		Report		Stadium: Juan José Vázquez; Referee: Gedidias Zacarías
	Penalties
	Aguilar (penalty scored); Cabañas (penalty missed); Mereles (penalty scored); Samudio (penalty missed); Gamarra (penalty scored)		(penalty scored) Cristaldo; (penalty missed) Romero; (penalty scored) Fernández; (penalty scored) Caballero; (penalty scored) Rodríguez

7 August 2018	Sportivo Trinidense	0–0 (4–2 p)	Guaireña	Villarrica
14:45		Report		Stadium: Parque del Guairá; Referee: José Méndez
	Penalties
	Irala (penalty scored); Salinas (penalty missed); Álvarez (penalty scored); Legal (penalty scored); Núñez (penalty scored)		(penalty missed) Solalinde; (penalty scored) Ortigoza; (penalty missed) Villalba; (penalty scored) Areco

7 August 2018	Sportivo Limpeño	0–0 (2–4 p)	Sportivo San Lorenzo	Asunción
16:45		Report		Stadium: La Arboleda; Referee: Carlos Benítez
	Penalties
	Sánchez (penalty missed); Rolón (penalty missed); Martínez (penalty scored); Patiño (penalty scored)		(penalty missed) Rodríguez; (penalty scored) Cáceres; (penalty scored) Valdez; (penalty scored) Báez; (penalty scored) Maciel

7 August 2018	Tacuary	1–1 (4–5 p)	Guaraní	Asunción
19:15	Passerini 58' (o.g.)	Report	Marín 4'	Stadium: La Arboleda; Referee: Derlis López
	Penalties
	Matta (penalty scored); Benítez (penalty missed); Ayala (penalty scored); Ortiz (penalty scored); Domínguez (penalty scored)		(penalty scored) Ayala; (penalty scored) Imperiale; (penalty scored) Gamarra; (penalty scored) Passerini; (penalty scored) Morel

21 August 2018	Oriental	0–0 (3–5 p)	Rubio Ñu	Asunción
19:15		Report		Stadium: Arsenio Erico; Referee: Gedidias Zacarías
	Penalties
	Benítez (penalty scored); Duré (penalty missed); Martínez (penalty scored); Orué (penalty scored)		(penalty scored) Ledezma; (penalty scored) Martínez; (penalty scored) Estigarribia; (penalty scored) González; (penalty scored) Florentín

22 August 2018	River Plate	4–0	Independiente (CG)	Luque
19:15	Schuartzman 45'; Ortigoza 54'; Maidana 66'; Santander 82'	Report		Stadium: General Adrián Jara; Referee: Héctor Bernal

23 August 2018	Independiente (PJC)	1–2	Deportivo Caaguazú	Pedro Juan Caballero
16:45	Medina 74'	Report	Martínez 11'; Delvalle 78' (pen.)	Stadium: Río Parapití; Referee: Alipio Colmán

23 August 2018	Colegiales	1–3	2 de Mayo	Pedro Juan Caballero
19:15	Enciso 90+3' (pen.)	Report	Santacruz 2'; Guachiré 32'; Ocampo 70'	Stadium: Río Parapití; Referee: David Ojeda

28 August 2018	General Caballero (CG)	0–3	3 de Febrero (CDE)	Ciudad del Este
16:45		Report	González 14'; Varela 37', 65'	Stadium: Antonio Aranda; Referee: Derlis López

28 August 2018	Atlético 13 de Junio	1–1 (3–4 p)	Nacional	Ciudad del Este
19:15	López 31'	Report	Bareiro 86'	Stadium: Antonio Aranda; Referee: Marcos Galeano
	Penalties
	Orquiola (penalty scored); Bogado (penalty missed); Ruiz (penalty scored); Amarilla (penalty scored); Samudio (penalty missed)		(penalty missed) Cardozo; (penalty scored) Dávalos; (penalty scored) Vieyra; (penalty scored) Santacruz; (penalty scored) Bareiro

29 August 2018	1° de Marzo	0–2	General Díaz	Asunción
19:15		Report	Doldán 8'; Leichtweis 30'	Stadium: Ricardo Gregor; Referee: Marco Franco

30 August 2018	Deportivo Alto Paraguay	0–7	Liberación	Liberación
14:45		Report	Arce 6'; Maldonado 25', 60'; Torales 46'; Giménez 83', 89'; Bernal 87'	Stadium: Atanacio Villagra; Referee: Ulises Mereles

4 September 2018	Atlético Juventud	4–3	Fulgencio Yegros	Asunción
16:45	Britos 7', 48', 58'; Cabral 17'	Report	Samudio 3'; Ruiz 68', 84'	Stadium: La Arboleda; Referee: Rodrigo Serafini

4 September 2018	Pilcomayo	0–2	Sol de América	Asunción
19:15		Report	Miño 71'; Acosta 90'	Stadium: La Arboleda; Referee: Julio Ojeda

5 September 2018	12 de Octubre (I)	0–2	Ovetense	Coronel Oviedo
14:45		Report	Gómez 47'; Chávez 89'	Stadium: Ovetenses Unidos; Referee: Zulma Quiñónez

5 September 2018	Teniente Fariña	1–3	Deportivo Capiatá	Asunción
19:15	Torres 16'	Report	Ermel 43', 85'; Benítez 74'	Stadium: Arsenio Erico; Referee: Dionisio Cristaldo

=== Second round ===
The second round was contested by the 24 first round winners. The 12 winners as well as the four losers with the best performance over both rounds qualified for the round of 16. The matches were played from 25 September to 4 October 2018.

25 September 2018	Sportivo Luqueño	5–3	Fernando de la Mora	Asunción
16:45	Bareiro 2'; Rojas 43'; Armoa 79', 82', 90+2'	Report	Estigarribia 19'; Campuzano 54'; Cubilla 64'	Stadium: Ricardo Gregor; Referee: Héctor Bernal

25 September 2018	Libertad	3–0	Rubio Ñu	Asunción
19:15	Alcaraz 29'; Giménez 55'; Amarilla 88'	Report		Stadium: Ricardo Gregor; Referee: Alipio Colmán

26 September 2018	Deportivo Santaní	2–0	Sportivo San Lorenzo	San Estanislao
16:00	Rodríguez 34'; Ovelar 62'	Report		Stadium: Juan José Vázquez; Referee: Víctor Ruiz Díaz

27 September 2018	General Díaz	0–0 (6–5 p)	Resistencia	Villa Elisa
16:45		Report		Stadium: Luis Alfonso Giagni; Referee: Marcos Galeano
	Penalties
	J. Doldán (penalty scored); Meza (penalty missed); Aranda (penalty scored); Prieto (penalty scored); Espínola (penalty scored); Benítez (penalty scored); S. Doldán (penalty scored)		(penalty scored) Mazacote; (penalty scored) Araújo; (penalty scored) Garay; (penalty missed) González; (penalty scored) Mendieta; (penalty scored) Zárate; (penalty missed) Medina

27 September 2018	3 de Febrero (CDE)	1–0	Ovetense	Ciudad del Este
19:15	Brizuela 23'	Report		Stadium: Antonio Aranda; Referee: Julio Ojeda

2 October 2018	Guaraní	2–0	Deportivo Caaguazú	Villarrica
15:00	Marín 30'; Rojas 70'	Report		Stadium: Parque del Guairá; Referee: Carlos Benítez

2 October 2018	Sol de América	3–1	R.I. 3 Corrales	Asunción
19:15	Álvarez 39' (pen.); Ruiz Díaz 75'; Franco 86'	Report	González 15'	Stadium: La Arboleda; Referee: Gedidias Zacarías
Note: The match was originally scheduled on 26 September at 20:10 in Luque but was postponed due to bad weather. It was rescheduled to 2 October at 19:15 in Asunción.

3 October 2018	Nacional	3–2	Liberación	San Estanislao
16:00	Cardozo 30'; Alegre 43'; Bareiro 70'	Report	Cardozo 28'; Franco 62' (o.g.)	Stadium: Juan José Vázquez; Referee: Víctor Ruiz Díaz

3 October 2018	Olimpia	1–1 (2–4 p)	Sportivo Trinidense	Luque
18:10	Benítez 35'	Report	Irala 83'	Stadium: General Adrián Jara; Referee: Dionisio Cristaldo
	Penalties
	Mendieta (penalty scored); Arias (penalty missed); R. Sánchez (penalty scored); Coronel (penalty missed)		(penalty scored) Irala; (penalty scored) Marín; (penalty scored) Legal; (penalty scored) Aveiro
Note: The match was originally scheduled on 26 September at 18:00 in Luque but was postponed due to bad weather. It was rescheduled to 3 October at 18:10 in Luque.

3 October 2018	Cerro Porteño	4–2	2 de Mayo	Pedro Juan Caballero
20:10	Benítez 24', 44'; Rojas 45'; Ruiz 73'	Report	Fernández 88', 90+1'	Stadium: Río Parapití; Referee: Marco Franco

4 October 2018	River Plate	5–0	Atlético Juventud	Capiatá
16:45	Schuartzman 16', 83'; Coronel 20'; Teixeira 28', 88'	Report		Stadium: Erico Galeano; Referee: David Ojeda

4 October 2018	Deportivo Capiatá	2–0	General Caballero (ZC)	Capiatá
19:15	Aldama 42'; Rodríguez 62'	Report		Stadium: Erico Galeano; Referee: César Rolón

==== Ranking of second round losers ====
The four teams among the second round losers with the best record in the two previous rounds qualified for the round of 16.

Pos	Grp	Team	Pld	W	D	L	GF	GA	GD	Pts	Result
1	O1	Olimpia	2	1	1	0	3	1	+2	4	Advance to round of 16
2	O3	Resistencia	2	1	1	0	4	3	+1	4	Advance to round of 16
3	O2	Liberación	2	1	0	1	9	3	+6	3	Advance to round of 16
4	O11	General Caballero (ZC)	2	1	0	1	4	2	+2	3	Advance to round of 16
5	O5	Ovetense	2	1	0	1	2	1	+1	3	
6	O6	Fernando de la Mora	2	1	0	1	5	5	0	3	
7	O7	2 de Mayo	2	1	0	1	5	5	0	3	
8	O10	R.I. 3 Corrales	2	1	0	1	3	4	−1	3	
9	O12	Deportivo Caaguazú	2	1	0	1	2	3	−1	3	
10	O9	Atlético Juventud	2	1	0	1	4	8	−4	3	
11	O8	Sportivo San Lorenzo	2	0	1	1	0	2	−2	1	
12	O4	Rubio Ñu	2	0	1	1	0	3	−3	1	

Source: APF
Rules for classification: 1) Points, 2) Goal difference, 3) Goals for, 4) Drawing of lots.

=== Bracket ===
Round of 16
3 de Febrero (CDE)	0 (4)
Sportivo Luqueño (p)	0 (5)
Nacional	0 (3)
Sportivo Trinidense (p)	0 (5)
General Díaz	1
Olimpia	2
Libertad	5
General Caballero (ZC)	0
Guaraní	1
Deportivo Capiatá	0
Cerro Porteño	1
River Plate	0
Liberación	0
Resistencia	2
Sol de América	2
Deportivo Santaní	0

Quarterfinals
Sportivo Luqueño	1
Sportivo Trinidense	0
Olimpia	1
Libertad	0
Guaraní	3
Cerro Porteño	0
Resistencia (p)	0 (5)
Sol de América	0 (4)

Semifinals
Sportivo Luqueño	1
Olimpia	3
Guaraní (p)	1 (5)
Resistencia	1 (4)

Final
Olimpia	2 (3)
Guaraní (p)	2 (5)
Third place play-off
Sportivo Luqueño	2
Resistencia	0

=== Round of 16 ===
The draw for the round of 16 was held on 10 October 2018. The matches were played from 23 to 31 October 2018.

23 October 2018	Guaraní	1–0	Deportivo Capiatá	Asunción
19:15	Bogarín 36'	Report		Stadium: Arsenio Erico; Referee: Carlos Benítez

24 October 2018	Nacional	1–1 (3–5 p)	Sportivo Trinidense	Asunción
16:00	Santacruz 86'	Report	Irala 77' (pen.)	Stadium: Arsenio Erico; Referee: Marcos Franco
	Penalties
	Rojas (penalty scored); Dávalos (penalty scored); Santacruz (penalty scored); Vieyra (penalty missed)		(penalty scored) Irala; (penalty scored) Marín; (penalty scored) Legal; (penalty scored) Aveiro; (penalty scored) Núñez
Note: The match was originally scheduled on 23 October at 16:45 in Luque but was postponed due to bad weather. It was rescheduled to 24 October at 16:00 in Asunción.

24 October 2018	General Díaz	1–2	Olimpia	Itauguá
16:00	Cáceres 51'	Report	Morínigo 12'; Ortega 49'	Stadium: Luis Alberto Salinas; Referee: Juan E. López

24 October 2018	Cerro Porteño	1–0	River Plate	Villa Elisa
19:15	Rojas 39'	Report		Stadium: Luis Alfonso Giagni; Referee: Julio Ojeda

25 October 2018	Liberación	0–2	Resistencia	Liberación
16:00		Report	Mazacote 2', 55'	Stadium: Atanacio Villagra; Referee: Dionisio Cristaldo

25 October 2018	Libertad	5–0	General Caballero (ZC)	Asunción
19:15	Leiva 9'; Arévalo 40'; Recalde 65', 90+1'; Zárate 79'	Report		Stadium: Rogelio Livieres; Referee: Alipio Colmán

31 October 2018	3 de Febrero (CDE)	0–0 (4–5 p)	Sportivo Luqueño	Villarrica
16:00		Report		Stadium: Parque del Guairá; Referee: Marcos Galeano
	Penalties
	González (penalty scored); Parra (penalty scored); Trombelli (penalty scored); Villagra (penalty missed); Samudio (penalty scored); Ferreira (penalty missed)		(penalty scored) Santana; (penalty missed) Cabrera; (penalty scored) Barreto; (penalty scored) Bareiro; (penalty scored) Medina; (penalty scored) Monges

31 October 2018	Sol de América	2–0	Deportivo Santaní	Asunción
19:15	Vargas 41'; Vera 90+1'	Report		Stadium: Ricardo Gregor; Referee: Carlos Benítez

=== Quarterfinals ===
Matches were played from 7 to 9 November 2018.

7 November 2018	Resistencia	0–0 (5–4 p)	Sol de América	Villarrica
16:00		Report		Stadium: Parque del Guairá; Referee: Fernando López
	Penalties
	Araújo (penalty scored); Pérez (penalty scored); Vera (penalty scored); Perozo (penalty scored); Mendieta (penalty scored)		(penalty scored) Ortiz; (penalty scored) Martínez; (penalty scored) Salcedo; (penalty missed) Ferreira; (penalty scored) Vera

7 November 2018	Olimpia	1–0	Libertad	Capiatá
19:15	Santa Cruz 57'	Report		Stadium: Erico Galeano; Referee: Derlis López

8 November 2018	Guaraní	3–0	Cerro Porteño	Itauguá
19:15	García 31'; Redes 48', 76'	Report		Stadium: Luis Alberto Salinas; Referee: Giancarlo Juliadoza

9 November 2018	Sportivo Luqueño	1–0	Sportivo Trinidense	Asunción
19:15	Santana 78'	Report		Stadium: Ricardo Gregor; Referee: Julio Ojeda

=== Semifinals ===
Both semifinal matches were played on 20 November 2018.

20 November 2018	Sportivo Luqueño	1–3	Olimpia	Itauguá
17:45	Bareiro 90+1' (pen.)	Report	Quintana 58'; Santa Cruz 83', 90+3'	Stadium: Luis Alberto Salinas; Referee: Juan E. López

20 November 2018	Guaraní	1–1 (5–4 p)	Resistencia	Capiatá
20:15	Rojas 16'	Report	De la Cruz 1' (o.g.)	Stadium: Erico Galeano; Referee: Mario Díaz de Vivar
	Penalties
	Centurión (penalty scored); Velásquez (penalty scored); Aquino (penalty scored); De la Cruz (penalty scored); Gamarra (penalty scored)		(penalty scored) Araújo; (penalty scored) Pérez; (penalty scored) Perozo; (penalty scored) Mazacote; (penalty missed) Mendieta

=== Third place play-off ===
4 December 2018	Sportivo Luqueño	2–0	Resistencia	Villa Elisa
17:30	Sanabria 46', 90'	Report		Stadium: Luis Alfonso Giagni; Referee: Carmen Gómez

=== Final ===
5 December 2018
19:15

Olimpia	2–2	Guaraní
Cardozo 32'; Santa Cruz 56'	Report	Velázquez 33'; Esparza 88'
Penalties
Patiño (penalty scored); Santa Cruz (penalty missed); Sánchez (penalty scored); Leguizamón (penalty scored)	3–5	(penalty scored) Centurión; (penalty scored) García; (penalty scored) De la Cruz; (penalty scored) Velázquez; (penalty scored) Gamarra

Estadio Río Parapití, Pedro Juan Caballero
Referee: Julio Quintana
