= Matías Pardo =

Matías Pardo may refer to:

- Matías Pardo (footballer, born 1988), Argentine defender
- Matías Pardo (footballer, born 1995), Argentine midfielder
