= Cubilla =

Cubilla is a surname of Spanish origin. Notable people with the surname include:

- Aldo Cubilla (born 2001), American footballer
- Cristóbal Cubilla (born 1962), Paraguayan football manager and former footballer
- Luis Cubilla (1940–2013), Uruguayan footballer and manager
- Pedro Cubilla (1933–2007), Uruguayan footballer and manager
- Walter Cubilla (born 1989), Argentine footballer
