= Franco Costa =

Franco Costa may refer to:

- Franco Costa (footballer) (born 1991), Argentine footballer
- Franco Costa (painter) (1935–2015), Italian painter
- Franco Costa (archbishop) (1904–1977), Italian Catholic archbishop
