= Apolinor Jiménez =

Paraguayan footballer (born 1944)

Apolinor Giménez
Personal information
- Full name: Apolinor Giménez Iriarte
- Date of birth: 20 January 1944 (age 82)
- Place of birth: Paraguarí, Paraguay
- Height: 1.85 m (6 ft 1 in)
- Position: Goalkeeper

Senior career*
Years	Team	Apps	(Gls)
1959–1961	Sudamérica de Paraguarí		
1962–1972	Olimpia		
1972–1975	Cruz Azul		
1975–1977	Puebla	33	(0)
1977–1978	Monterrey		
1978	Independiente Medellín	14	(0)
1979	Capitán Figari		
1980–1984	Olimpia		
1985	San Lorenzo		
1988	Capiatá		

International career
1969	Paraguay		
- * Club domestic league appearances and goals

Apolinor Giménez Iriarte (born 20 January 1944) is a Paraguayan former football goalkeeper. He played most of his club career for Club Olimpia, winning six league titles in 14 seasons.

== Playing career ==
Born in Paraguarí, Giménez emerged from the youth team of Club Sudamérica de Paraguarí. He joined Asunción side Club Olimpia in 1962, and would win four Paraguayan Primera División in a decade with the club.

In 1972, Giménez moved abroad to play for Cruz Azul in the Primera División de México. He won three titles in three years with the club.

Giménez was called up as a third goalkeeper for the Paraguay national football team which played in the 1970 FIFA World Cup qualifiers.
