= Luis de la Cruz =

Luis de la Cruz may refer to:

- Luis de la Cruz (politician), Chilean politician
- Luis de la Cruz (footballer), Paraguay footballer
