= Richard Lugo =

Richard Lugo may refer to:

- Richard Lugo (basketball) (born 1973), Venezuelan basketball player
- Richard Lugo (footballer) (born 1992), Paraguayan footballer
