= Jesús Amarilla =

Paraguayan footballer (born 2001)

Jesus Amarilla
Personal information
- Full name: Jesús Alexandro Amarilla Solís
- Date of birth: 27 August 2001 (age 25)
- Place of birth: Asunción, Paraguay
- Height: 1.77 m (5 ft 10 in)
- Position: Attacking midfielder

Team information
- Current team: Chaco For Ever
- Number: 20

Youth career
- Libertad

Senior career*
Years	Team	Apps	(Gls)
2018–2021	Libertad	14	(0)
2022	Atyrá		
2022	Atlético Colegiales		
2023–2024	3 de Febrero		
2025–	Chaco For Ever	14	(0)
- * Club domestic league appearances and goals as of 18:06, 3 January 2026 (UTC)

Jesús Alexandro Amarilla Solís (born 26 August 2001) is a Paraguayan footballer who plays as an attacking midfielder for Argentine club Chaco For Ever.

== Career ==
=== Club career ===
On 22 April 2018, 16-year old Amarilla got his official debut for Club Libertad against Club Guaraní in the Paraguayan Primera División. He made a total of eight appearances for Libertad in that season. In the following season, he made six appearances, mostly playing for the clubs reserve team.

In 2022, Amarilla played for Atyrá FC and in 2023 for Atlético Colegiales and later 3 de Febrero.

In February 2025, Amarilla signed with Argentine Primera Nacional side Chaco For Ever.
