= Santiago Martinez (footballer, born 1995) =

Paraguayan footballer

Personal information
- Full name: Santiago Daniel Martinez Roa
- Date of birth: 16 August 1995 (age 31)
- Place of birth: Limpio, Paraguay
- Position: Midfielder

Senior career*
Years	Team	Apps	(Gls)
2015–2016	Vllaznia Shkodër	5	(0)
2017	Sportivo Luqueño		
2019–2020	Gafanha		
- * Club domestic league appearances and goals as of 6 November 2015

Santiago Daniel Martinez Roa (born 16 August 1995) is a Paraguayan former footballer who played as a midfielder.

== Club career ==
On 31 August 2015, Martinez signed a one-year contract with Albanian club Vllaznia Shkodër for an undisclosed fee. He made his Albanian Superliga debut twenty days later, playing full-90 minutes in Vllaznia's 2–0 loss against Flamurtari Vlorë. On 4 November, Martinez scored his first goal as a Vllaznia player, netting the second goal of the match against Apolonia Fier in the second match of the second round of 2015–16 Albanian Cup, which was proved to be the winner as Vllaznia advanced to the quarter-finals. He was released during the winter transfer window.

== Career statistics ==
As of 20 November 2015

Club	Season	League		Cup		Europe		Other		Total	
Club	Season	Apps	Goals	Apps	Goals	Apps	Goals	Apps	Goals	Apps	Goals
Vllaznia Shkodër	2015–16	5	0	3	1	—		—		8	1
Career total		5	0	3	1	0	0	0	0	8	1
