= Jorge Mendoza =

Paraguayan footballer (born 1989)

Personal information
- Full name: Jorge Darío Mendoza Torres
- Date of birth: 15 May 1989 (age 37)
- Place of birth: Buenos Aires, Argentina
- Height: 1.76 m (5 ft 9 1/2 in)
- Position: Midfielder

Senior career*
Years	Team	Apps	(Gls)
2009–2019	Guaraní	269	(20)
2016–2017	→ Olimpia (loan)	29	(3)
2017–2018	→ Ponte Preta (loan)	2	(0)
2019	Sol de América	20	(1)
2020–2021	Guaireña	61	(5)
2022	Guaraní	40	(2)
2023–2024	Sportivo Luqueño	65	(2)

International career
2012	Paraguay	4	(0)
- * Club domestic league appearances and goals as of 16:06, 3 June 2025 (UTC)

Jorge Mendoza (born 15 May 1989) is a Paraguayan international footballer who plays as a midfielder.

== Career ==
Mendoza has played for Guaraní since 2009.

He made his international debut for Paraguay in 2012.
