= Matías Pardo (footballer, born 1988) =

Argentine footballer

Personal information
- Full name: Matías Pardo
- Date of birth: 17 March 1988 (age 38)
- Place of birth: Lanús, Argentina
- Position: Defender

Senior career*
Years	Team	Apps	(Gls)
2008–2011	Victoriano Arenas	51	(4)
2013	Acassuso	1	(0)
2013–2014	Sportivo Barracas	10	(1)
2014–2017	Liniers	46	(1)
- * Club domestic league appearances and goals as of 02:38, 22 December 2018 (UTC)

Matías Pardo (born 17 March 1988) is an Argentine footballer who plays as a defender. He is currently a free agent.

== Career ==
Pardo began his career with Victoriano Arenas, first participating in a senior match for the club in 2008. After three years and four goals in fifty-one Primera D Metropolitana fixtures, Pardo moved to Primera B Metropolitana side Acassuso. He made his professional bow for them in 2013. Months later, Sportivo Barracas of the fifth tier signed Pardo. 2014 saw the defender join Liniers. Having spent two years with them, they won promotion to Primera C Metropolitana in 2016; before returning to Primera D Metropolitana twelve months later. He subsequently departed Liniers, after one goal in forty-six encounters.

== Career statistics ==
As of 22 December 2018.

Club statistics
Club	Season	League			Cup (Note: Includes the Copa Argentina)		League Cup		Continental		Other		Total	
Club	Season	Division	Apps	Goals	Apps	Goals	Apps	Goals	Apps	Goals	Apps	Goals	Apps	Goals
Acassuso	2012–13	Primera B Metropolitana	1	0	0	0	—		—		0	0	1	0
Sportivo Barracas	2013–14	Primera D Metropolitana	10	1	0	0	—		—		0	0	10	1
Liniers	2016	Primera C Metropolitana	3	0	0	0	—		—		0	0	3	0
Career total			14	1	0	0	—		—		0	0	14	1
