= Silvio Borjas =

Paraguayan footballer (born 1990)

Personal information
- Full name: Silvio Rodrigo Borjas Guerrero
- Date of birth: 19 April 1990 (age 36)
- Place of birth: Asunción, Paraguay
- Height: 1.87 m (6 ft 2 in)
- Position: Centre-back

Team information
- Current team: Paysandú

Senior career*
Years	Team	Apps	(Gls)
2012	Independiente	33	(3)
2015–2016	Cruz Azul	0	(0)
2016–2017	Deportivo Capiatá	6	(2)
2018	Técnico Universitario	16	(1)
2018	Club 2 de Mayo		
2022–2023	Club 24 de Setiembre	14	(0)
2023–2024	Atlético Colegiales	7	(1)
2024–	Paysandú		
- * Club domestic league appearances and goals as of 4 September 2023

Silvio Rodrigo Borjas Guerrero (born 19 April 1990) is a Paraguayan professional footballer who plays as a centre-back for Uruguayan club Paysandú.
