= Bernardo Medina =

Paraguayan footballer (born 1988)

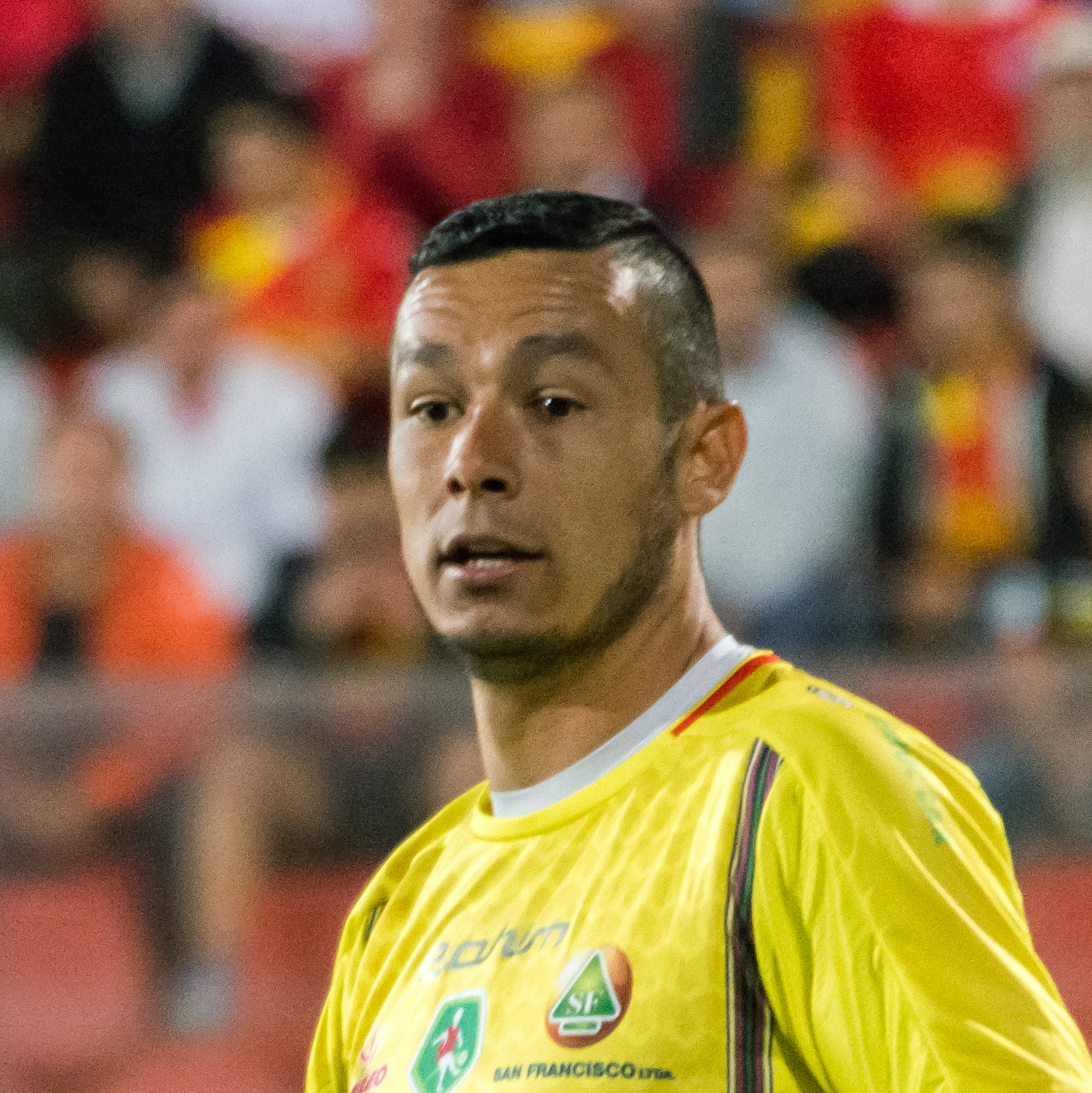
- Medina with Mushuc Runa in 2019

Personal information
- Full name: Bernardo David Medina
- Date of birth: 14 January 1988 (age 38)
- Place of birth: Asunción, Paraguay
- Height: 1.86 m (6 ft 1 in)
- Position: Goalkeeper

Team information
- Current team: 3 de Febrero
- Number: 1

Youth career
- 2001–2007: Libertad

Senior career*
Years	Team	Apps	(Gls)
2007–2013	Libertad	65	(0)
2013–2016	General Díaz	130	(4)
2017	Deportivo Capiatá	40	(0)
2018–2019	Sportivo Luqueño	11	(0)
2019	Mushuc Runa	13	(0)
2019	Deportivo Capiatá	18	(0)
2020	Atlético Grau	28	(0)
2021	Nacional	1	(0)
2022	12 de Octubre	24	(0)
2023	Sol de América	30	(0)
2024	Santiago Morning	2	(0)
2024–2025	Sol de América	8	(0)
2025	Tacuary	27	(0)
2026–	3 de Febrero	–	(–)

International career
2014	Paraguay	1	(0)
- * Club domestic league appearances and goals as of 19 March 2026

Bernardo David Medina (born 14 January 1988) is a Paraguayan international footballer who plays as a goalkeeper for 3 de Febrero in the Paraguay Primera División B.

== Career ==
Medina has played for Libertad since 2007 to 2013. In 2013 to 2016 at General Díaz and in 2017 for Deportivo Capiatá.

In 2024, he moved to Chile and signed with Santiago Morning.
