= Juan Acosta (footballer) =

Uruguayan footballer (born 1993)

Personal information
- Full name: Juan Manuel Acosta Díaz
- Date of birth: 11 November 1993 (age 33)
- Place of birth: Rocha, Uruguay
- Height: 1.73 m (5 ft 8 in)
- Position: Defender

Team information
- Current team: Boston River
- Number: 31

Youth career
- Lavalleja FC

Senior career*
Years	Team	Apps	(Gls)
2015–2017	Rocha	12	(0)
2017–2020	Cerro Largo	76	(0)
2020–2022	Peñarol	21	(0)
2022–2023	Montevideo Wanderers	64	(0)
2024–	Boston River	43	(1)
- * Club domestic league appearances and goals as of 1 October 2025

Juan Manuel Acosta Díaz (born 11 November 1993) is a Uruguayan footballer who plays as a defender for Boston River in the Uruguayan Primera División.
