= Derlis Rodríguez =

Paraguayan professional footballer (born 1997)

Personal information
- Full name: Derlis Osmar Rodríguez Maciel
- Date of birth: 18 September 1997 (age 29)
- Place of birth: Capiatá, Paraguay
- Height: 1.76 m (5 ft 9 in)
- Position: Midfielder

Team information
- Current team: Club Cerro Porteño

Senior career*
Years	Team	Apps	(Gls)
2015–2017	Club Libertad	5	(0)
2018	Deportivo Santaní	20	(2)
2021	Tacuary	1	(1)
2022–2024	Tacuary	60	(11)
2024–	Club Cerro Porteño	21	(2)
- * Club domestic league appearances and goals

Derlis Osmar Rodríguez Maciel (born 18 September 1997) is a Paraguayan professional footballer who plays as a midfielder for Club Cerro Porteño in the Paraguayan Primera División.

== Career ==
=== Early career and professional debut ===
Rodríguez was developed in the youth academy of Club Libertad. He made his debut in the Paraguayan Primera División on 27 November 2015 in a 1-0 defeat against Rubio Ñu, a match in which Rodríguez was also sent off with a second yellow card in the 80th minute. During his time at Libertad, he had few opportunities in the first team, playing 5 matches without scoring.

=== Deportivo Santaní and Tacuary ===
In 2018, he joined Deportivo Santaní, where he played 20 matches and scored 2 goals. His performance led him to sign with Tacuary in 2021, where he became an important player for the team.

=== Cerro Porteño ===
On 7 June 2024, his transfer to Club Cerro Porteño was announced, with the club acquiring 80% of his federative rights. He signed a three-year contract.

== Career statistics ==
Updated as of February 2025.

Season	Club	League			National Cups			International Cups			Total	
Season	Club	Competition	Apps	Goals	Competition	Apps	Goals	Competition	Apps	Goals	Apps	Goals
2015-2017	(Paraguay) Club Libertad	Primera División	5	0	-	-	-	-	-	-	-	-
2018	(Paraguay) Deportivo Santaní	Primera División	20	2	-	-		-	-	-	-	-
2021	(Paraguay) Tacuary	División Intermedia	1	1	Copa Paraguay	2	1	-	-	-	3	2
2022-2024	(Paraguay) Tacuary	Primera División	60	11	Copa Paraguay	2	1	Copa Sudamericana	2	0	64	12
2024-2025	(Paraguay) Club Cerro Porteño	Primera División	21	2	Copa Paraguay	0	0	Copa Libertadores	1	0	22	2
Career total			107	14		4	2		3	0	89	16

== Honours ==
Competition	Club	Year
Champion División Profesional (Apertura)	Club Libertad	2016, 2017
Runner-up División Profesional (Apertura)	Club Cerro Porteño	2024
