= Federico Acuña (footballer) =

Paraguayan footballer (born 1985)

Personal information
- Full name: Federico Acuña Cabrera
- Date of birth: 25 March 1985 (age 41)
- Place of birth: San Pedro de Paraná, Paraguay
- Height: 1.81 m (5 ft 11 in)
- Position: Centre back

Team information
- Current team: Sol de América
- Number: 3

Senior career*
Years	Team	Apps	(Gls)
2004–2005	Sportivo Luqueño		
2005–2006	General Caballero	0	(0)
2006–2007	Tacuary	28	(1)
2007–2008	Vélez Sarsfield		
2008	Gimnasia de Jujuy	27	(1)
2009	Guaraní		
2010–2011	Sportivo Luqueño	43	(2)
2012	3 de Febrero		
2013	Sport Colombia		
2013	Sportivo Carapeguá	9	(0)
2014	Guaraní Antonio Franco	0	(0)
2015–2016	Deportivo Capiatá	51	(1)
2016	General Díaz	20	(2)
2017–	Sol de América	75	(2)
- * Club domestic league appearances and goals as of 20:41, 24 September 2019 (UTC)

Federico Acuña (born 25 March 1985) is a Paraguayan football centre-back. He currently plays for Tacuary F.B.C.

== Career ==
Acuña started his playing career in 2004 with Sportivo Luqueño. In 2005, he joined General Caballero, and in 2006, he transferred to Tacuary.

In 2007, Acuña joined Vélez Sársfield of the Argentine Primera for a trial period that lasted the whole pre-season. However, he was not signed by Vélez and instead joined Gimnasia y Esgrima de Jujuy. He returned to Paraguay to play for Guaraní in 2009.
