= Nery Cardozo =

Paraguayan footballer (born 1989)

Personal information
- Full name: Nery Antonio Cardozo Escobar
- Date of birth: 26 May 1989 (age 37)
- Height: 1.80 m (5 ft 11 in)
- Position: Forward

Senior career*
Years	Team	Apps	(Gls)
2005–2006	Atlético Tembetary		
2007–2013	Rubio Ñu	72	(21)
2012	→ Viking FK (loan)		
2014	→ Olimpia (loan)	13	(3)
2014	→ Gimnasia y Esgrima La Plata (loan)	9	(0)
2015	Rubio Ñu	36	(10)
2015–2016	Olimpia	26	(7)
2016–2017	→ Guaraní (loan)	12	(0)
2017–2018	Rubio Ñu	36	(10)
2018	Nacional	22	(3)
- * Club domestic league appearances and goals

Nery Antonio Cardozo Escobar (born 26 May 1989) is a Paraguayan former professional footballer who played as a forward. He has the record of the fastest goal in the history of 104 seasons of football of Asociación Paraguaya de Fútbol in 2011.

== Career ==
=== Atlético Tembertary ===
Cardozo was born in Quiindy, Paraguay. In 2005, he formed part of Tembetary's squad as a 16-year-old, along with Jorge Aquino. Both players remained at the club for the following season. In 2007, he appeared for the squad in Paraguay's third-tier league.

=== Rubio Ñu ===
In October 2011, Cardozo netted for Rubio Ñu against Olimpia Asunción. In April 2011, Cardozo achieved the record of scoring the fasting goal in 104 seasons of Paraguayan football, scoring against Cerro Porteño in 7 and a fraction seconds.

==== Viking (loan) ====
In March 2012, Cardozo impressed well coach Age Hareide in his first friendly game in Norway against Ålesund, only being in the country for 24 hours before it. Cardozo's transfer to Viking FK was a loan deal from Rubio Ñú.

==== Olimpia Asunción (loan) ====
In January 2014, Cardozo agreed to a six-month deal with Olimpia Asunción. Chilean Primera División club O'Higgins wanted to sign Cardozo, but he signalled that he wanted to play for Olimpia. His signing to Olimpia was a loan from his owner club Rubio Ñu. Cardozo prepared the 2012 pre-season training with Rubio Ñu, before he was chosen as a signing by Olimpia coach Ever Hugo Almeida. He began very well the first friendlies of the 2014 season with goals. In February 2014, Cardozo received surgery which was a successful operation according to Olimpia's medic, and that the player could return within one month.

==== Gimnasia LP (loan) ====
In July 2014, Cardozo left Olimpia to join Gimnasia La Plata. His contract was until December 2015. In January 2015, Cardozo gave his consent to return to Rubio Ñu whilst he was negotiating his departure with Gimnasia La Plata.

=== Guaraní ===
In June 2016, Cardozo joined Club Guaraní, becoming their third signing for the Torneo Clausura.

=== Nacional Asunción ===
In February 2018, Cardozo signed with Nacional Asunción.

=== Independiente CG ===
In 2019, Cardozo formed part of the Independiente CG squad with Victor Mareco and Aldo Paniagua, which played in the Copa Sudamericana, despite bring in the Paraguay División Intermedia.

== Honours ==
Individual

- Fastest goal in the history of 104 seasons of football of Asociación Paraguaya de Fútbol in 2011.
