= Sergio Vergara (Paraguayan footballer) =

Paraguayan footballer (born 1988)

Personal information
- Full name: Sergio Raúl Vergara Romero
- Date of birth: 15 December 1988 (age 37)
- Place of birth: Asunción, Paraguay
- Height: 1.78 m (5 ft 10 in)
- Position: Left back

Team information
- Current team: Deportivo Capiatá (on loan from Olimpia)
- Number: 16

Senior career*
Years	Team	Apps	(Gls)
2010–2014	Sportivo Luqueño	116	(4)
2013	→ Cerro Porteño (loan)	5	(0)
2015–2018	Libertad	53	(1)
2017–2018	→ Sportivo Luqueño (loan)	34	(2)
2018–	Olimpia	6	(0)
2019–	→ Deportivo Capiatá (loan)	14	(1)

International career
2011	Paraguay	1	(0)
- * Club domestic league appearances and goals as of 22:26, 10 October 2019 (UTC)

Sergio Raúl Vergara Romero (born 15 December 1988) is a Paraguayan international footballer who plays for Deportivo Capiatá on loan from Club Olimpia, as a left back.

== Career ==
Vergara has played for Sportivo Luqueño since 2010.

He made his international debut for Paraguay in 2011.
