= Walter Cubilla =

Argentine footballer

Personal information
- Full name: Walter Silvestre Cubilla
- Date of birth: 5 March 1989 (age 37)
- Place of birth: Pergamino, Argentina
- Height: 1.75 m (5 ft 9 in)
- Position: Attacking midfielder

Team information
- Current team: Juventud Copalera

Youth career
- Lanús

Senior career*
Years	Team	Apps	(Gls)
2008–2009	Lanús	0	(0)
2009–2011	Atlanta	15	(0)
2011	Deportes Antofagasta	6	(0)
2012	La Equidad	0	(0)
2013	Gloria Bistrița	10	(1)
2013	Deportivo Pereira	6	(0)
2014	Rubio Ñu	4	(1)
2014–2015	Cerro Largo	23	(3)
2015	Huracán FC	5	(1)
2016–2017	Cerro Largo	11	(2)
2017	Sport Victoria	21	(3)
2018	Club Oriental	11	(4)
2018	Universitario Popayán	7	(0)
2019	Deportes Quindío	2	(0)
2021	Delfines del Este	–	(–)
2022–2023	Paso de la Arena	–	(–)
2023	Estudiantes del Plata	–	(–)
2024–	Juventud Copalera	–	(–)
- * Club domestic league appearances and goals as of 25 October 2024

Walter Silvestre Cubilla (born 5 March 1989) is an Argentine footballer who plays as an attacking midfielder for Guatemalan club Juventud Copalera.

== Career ==
Cubilla was born in Pergamino.

In 2013, he emigrated to Europe and had a stint with Gloria Bistrița in the Liga I.

After being a free agent in the context of COVID-19 pandemic, Cubilla moved to the Dominican Republic and joined Delfines del Este in 2021.

Back to South America, Cubilla joined Uruguayan club Paso de la Arena in the second half of 2022. The next year, he switched to Estudiantes del Plata.

In 2024, Cubilla joined Guatemalan club Juventud Copalera.

== Honours ==
Deportes Antofagasta

- Chilean Primera División B: 2011
