= Luis de la Cruz (footballer) =

Paraguayan footballer (born 1991)

Luis de La Cruz
Personal information
- Full name: Luis Eladio de La Cruz
- Date of birth: 23 March 1991 (age 35)
- Height: 1.76 m (5 ft 9 1/2 in)
- Positions: Right back; left back

Team information
- Current team: Sportivo Trinidense
- Number: 8

Senior career*
Years	Team	Apps	(Gls)
2008–2019	Guarani	279	(21)
2019–2022	Olimpia	19	(1)
2021	→ Sol de América (loan)	15	(2)
2023–	Sportivo Trinidense	105	(4)

International career^{‡}
2015–	Paraguay	1	(0)
- * Club domestic league appearances and goals as of 12 August 2025 ‡ National team caps and goals as of 26 March 2018

Luis de la Cruz (born 23 March 1991) is a Paraguay international footballer who plays for Sportivo Trinidense as a right back or left back.

== Club career ==
de la Cruz has played club football for Guarani.

== International career ==
He was called up to the senior Paraguay squad in September 2015 for a match against Chile.
