= Club Capitán Figari =

Paraguayan football club

Capitán Figari
- Full name: Club Capitán Figarí
- Founded: March 1, 1931
- Ground: Estadio Juan B. Ruíz Díaz, Lambaré
- Capacity: 4,200
- Chairman: (Paraguay) José Luis Gauto Galeano
- Manager: (Paraguay) Mauricio Perez
- League: Primera División B
Home colours	Away colours

Club Capitán Figari is a Paraguayan football club based in the city of Lambaré. The club was founded March 1, 1931 and plays in the "Primera División B" division of the Paraguayan league (which is equivalent to the third division). Their home games are played at the Estadio Juan B. Ruíz Díaz which has a capacity of approximately 4,200 seats.

== History ==
It was founded on 1 March 1931 and its first president was Sinforiano Barrios. Soon, the club joined the Liga Lambareña de Fútbol, the Unión del Fútbol del Interior. In this league remained for more than four decades and won numerous championships.

In 1978 he was admitted to the tournament of the Segunda de Ascenso, the third division of the Paraguayan Football League, won the championship that same year undefeated. In 1979, also in the club's first participation in the Second Division, the club managed to win the title and reached the First Division. They only lasted a year in the top division.

In 2000, having participated for many years in the Second Division, third category which became the fourth in 1997 (with the creation of the Middle or new Second) won the championship that allowed the club to return to the Third Division.

They fell again in 2002, but the runner reached almost a decade later, in 2011, earned the team a place back in the third category of Paraguayan football.

The skipper of Figari and Empoli FC signed an agreement by which it is established that the Italian bank will charge the Organization and administration all lower division club. The event was attended by José Luis Gauto Galeano, president of Figari, and Carlos Bruni, head of the Scuola Italiana di Football in representation of Empoli.

== Players ==
Note: Flags indicate national team as defined under FIFA eligibility rules; some limited exceptions apply. Players may hold more than one non-FIFA nationality.

No.	Pos.	Nation	Player
—	GK	PAR	Eugenio Ramírez
—	DF	PAR	Alfredo Brítez
—	DF	PAR	Carlos Ferreira
—	DF	PAR	Jorge Morínigo
—	DF	PAR	José Rodríguez
—	MF	PAR	Derlis Acosta
—	MF	PAR	Fulgencio Blanco

No.	Pos.	Nation	Player
—	MF	PAR	Roberto Chena
—	MF	PAR	Luca Conigliaro
—	MF	PAR	Juan Melgarejo
—	FW	PAR	Ricardo Fernández
—	FW	PAR	Reinaldo Noguera
—	FW	PAR	Gumercindo Portillo
—	FW	PAR	Javier Villalba

== Honours ==
- Paraguayan Second Division
  - Champions (1): 1978
- Paraguayan Third Division
  - Champions (1): 1977
- Paraguayan Fourth Division
  - Champions (1): 2000
- Paraguayan Fourth Division
  - Runners-up (1): 2011
