= Franco Costa (footballer) =

Argentine professional footballer

Personal information
- Full name: Franco Lautaro Costa
- Date of birth: 10 December 1991 (age 34)
- Place of birth: Luján, Argentina
- Height: 1.62 m (5 ft 4 in)
- Position: Midfielder

Team information
- Current team: Ilioupoli
- Number: 32

Senior career*
Years	Team	Apps	(Gls)
2012–2013	Luján	30	(6)
2013–2017	Arsenal de Sarandí	12	(0)
2014	→ Flandria (loan)	19	(6)
2015	→ Tristán Suárez (loan)	12	(5)
2017	Flandria	25	(6)
2017–2019	San Martín T.	28	(3)
2019–2022	Nacional	86	(6)
2021	→ Sol de América (loan)	6	(0)
2022–	General Caballero JLM	1	(0)
- * Club domestic league appearances and goals as of 20:15, 18 July 2022 (UTC)

Franco Lautaro Costa (born 10 December 1991) is an Argentine professional footballer who plays as a midfielder for Greek Super League 2 club Ilioupoli.

== Career ==
Costa's career started with Luján, prior to moving to Arsenal de Sarandí in 2013. In that same year, he was loaned out to Primera B Metropolitana side Flandria for six months. He returned to Arsenal in 2015 and featured in eight Argentine Primera División fixtures, including his debut for the club in a 0–0 draw with Lanús on 8 March. He was subsequently, in July, sent out on loan once again, this time to Tristán Suárez of Primera B Metropolitana. He scored six goals in thirteen games for Tristán Suárez. In January 2017, Costa almost joined China League One club Nei Mongol Zhongyou. However, the move fell through.

Costa subsequently rejoined former side Flandria, now in Primera B Nacional. On 2 August, Costa left Flandria to join San Martín. His debut came against Ferro Carril Oeste on 16 September in Primera B Nacional, it was also his 100th career league appearance. Costa signed for Paraguayan Primera División side Nacional in January 2019, having terminated his San Martín contract.

== Career statistics ==
As of 22 January 2019.

Club statistics
Club	Season	League			Cup		Continental		Other		Total	
Club	Season	Division	Apps	Goals	Apps	Goals	Apps	Goals	Apps	Goals	Apps	Goals
Luján	2012–13	Primera C Metropolitana	30	6	0	0	—		0	0	30	6
Arsenal de Sarandí	2013–14	Argentine Primera División	0	0	0	0	0	0	0	0	0	0
Arsenal de Sarandí	2014	Argentine Primera División	0	0	0	0	0	0	0	0	0	0
Arsenal de Sarandí	2015	Argentine Primera División	8	0	0	0	0	0	0	0	8	0
Arsenal de Sarandí	2016	Argentine Primera División	2	0	0	0	—		0	0	2	0
Arsenal de Sarandí	2016–17	Argentine Primera División	2	0	2	0	—		0	0	4	0
Arsenal de Sarandí	Total		12	0	2	0	0	0	0	0	14	0
Flandria (loan)	2014	Primera C Metropolitana	19	6	0	0	—		0	0	19	6
Tristán Suárez (loan)	2015	Primera B Metropolitana	12	5	0	0	—		1 (Note: Appearance(s) in the Primera B Metropolitana play-offs)	1	13	6
Flandria	2016–17	Primera B Nacional	25	6	0	0	—		0	0	25	6
San Martín	2017–18	Primera B Nacional	17	1	0	0	—		4 (Note: Appearance(s) in the Primera B Nacional play-offs)	1	21	2
San Martín	2018–19	Argentine Primera División	7	1	2	0	—		0	0	9	1
San Martín	Total		24	2	2	0	0	0	4	1	30	3
Nacional	2019	Paraguayan Primera División	0	0	0	0	0	0	0	0	0	0
Career total			122	24	4	0	0	0	5	2	131	26
