= Víctor Centurión =

Paraguayan footballer (born 1986)

Personal information
- Full name: Víctor Hugo Centurión Miranda
- Date of birth: 24 February 1986 (age 40)
- Place of birth: Yataity del Norte, Paraguay
- Height: 1.83 m (6 ft 0 in)
- Position: Goalkeeper

Youth career
- 2003–2005: Sportivo Iteño

Senior career*
| Years | Team | Apps | (Gls) |
| 2005–2006 | Sportivo Iteño | 22 | (0) |
| 2008–2009 | Libertad | 7 | (0) |
| 2009–2010 | Sol de América | 24 | (0) |
| 2010 | Tacuary | 29 | (0) |
| 2011 | Deportivo Cali | 20 | (0) |
| 2011–2016 | Olimpia | 81 | (0) |
| 2017 | Sportivo Luqueño | 13 | (0) |
| 2017–2019 | Guaraní | 45 | (1) |
| 2019–2020 | Sol de América | 4 | (0) |
| 2021 | Rubio Ñu | | |
| 2021 | Trikala | 9 | (0) |

International career
| 2009–2015 | Paraguay | 3 | (0) |
- * Club domestic league appearances and goals as of 20:00, 19 December 2021 (UTC)

Víctor Hugo Centurión Miranda (born 24 February 1986) is a Paraguayan professional footballer who plays as a goalkeeper.

== Career ==
Víctor Centurión's international debut was in May 2014.
