= Matías Pardo (footballer, born 1995) =

Argentine footballer

Personal information
- Full name: Matías Gabriel Pardo
- Date of birth: 7 April 1995 (age 31)
- Place of birth: Moron, Argentina
- Height: 1.69 m (5 ft 7 in)
- Position: Winger

Team information
- Current team: Atlético Rafaela

Youth career
- Deportivo Morón

Senior career*
Years	Team	Apps	(Gls)
2015–2019	Deportivo Morón	72	(6)
2019	→ Sol de América (loan)	33	(4)
2020–2022	Sol de América	36	(3)
2021–2022	→ Patronato (loan)	25	(0)
2023	San Martín Tucumán	10	(1)
2023–2024	Diagoras	9	(0)
2024	Racing Córdoba	17	(0)
2024–2025	Atlético Rafaela	14	(1)
2025–2026	Patronato	17	(0)
2026–	Atlético Rafaela	5	(0)
- * Club domestic league appearances and goals as of 18:29, 27 March 2026 (UTC)

Matías Gabriel Pardo (born 7 April 1995) is an Argentine professional footballer who plays as a winger for Atlético Rafaela.

== Career ==
Pardo started in the system of Deportivo Morón. He made his professional debut on 2 November 2015 during a 1–1 draw with Flandria, which was one of five appearances throughout the 2015 Primera B Metropolitana campaign. Two seasons later, Pardo scored five goals, including his career first against Acassuso on 16 September, as the club went on to win the 2016–17 title and subsequent promotion to Primera B Nacional. January 2019 saw Pardo join Paraguay's Sol de América on loan. He scored on his second appearance, netting in a 3–2 loss to Deportivo Capiatá on 27 January.

Sol de América signed Pardo permanently at the end of 2019, a campaign that saw him score four times in thirty-three league matches and make his Copa Sudamericana bow; away to Mineros de Guayana on 2 April. In July 2021, Pardo returned to Argentina, when he signed a loan deal with Patronato until the end of 2022. In the beginning of December 2021, Pardo suffered an anterior cruciate ligament injury, which was set to keep him out for at least six months.

== Career statistics ==
As of 23 October 2020.

Club statistics
Club	Season	League			Cup		League Cup		Continental		Other		Total	
Club	Season	Division	Apps	Goals	Apps	Goals	Apps	Goals	Apps	Goals	Apps	Goals	Apps	Goals
Deportivo Morón	2015	Primera B Metropolitana	2	0	0	0	—		—		3 (Note: Appearance(s) in the Primera B Metropolitana play-offs)	0	5	0
Deportivo Morón	2016	Primera B Metropolitana	13	0	1	0	—		—		0	0	14	0
Deportivo Morón	2016–17	Primera B Metropolitana	34	5	1	0	—		—		0	0	35	5
Deportivo Morón	2017–18	Primera B Nacional	12	0	4	0	—		—		0	0	16	0
Deportivo Morón	2018–19	Primera B Nacional	11	1	1	0	—		—		0	0	12	1
Deportivo Morón	Total		72	6	7	0	—		—		3	0	82	6
Sol de América (loan)	2019	Primera División	33	4	0	0	—		3	0	0	0	36	4
Sol de América	2020	Primera División	19	2	0	0	—		2	0	0	0	21	2
Sol de América	Total		52	6	0	0	—		5	0	0	0	57	6
Career total			124	12	7	0	—		5	0	3	0	139	12

== Honours ==
Deportivo Morón

- Primera B Metropolitana: 2016–17
