= Richard Lugo (footballer) =

Paraguayan footballer (born 1992)

Personal information
- Full name: Richard Martín Lugo Martínez
- Date of birth: 20 June 1992 (age 34)
- Place of birth: Lambaré, Paraguay
- Height: 1.79 m (5 ft 10 in)
- Position: Winger

Team information
- Current team: Fidelis Andria

Youth career
- Udinese
- 2010–2012: Colón

Senior career*
Years	Team	Apps	(Gls)
2012	Independiente CG	25	(1)
2013	Carapeguá	23	(3)
2013–2014	Bari	20	(1)
2014–2015	Grosseto	23	(2)
2016	Guaraní	0	(0)
2016	→ River Plate (loan)	12	(0)
2017	General Díaz	9	(0)
2017–2018	Bisceglie	19	(1)
2018	Virtus Francavilla	27	(1)
2019	Nacional	3	(0)
2020–	Fidelis Andria	0	(0)
- * Club domestic league appearances and goals as of 16 December 2018

Richard Martín Lugo Martínez (born 20 June 1992) is a Paraguayan footballer who plays for Serie D club Fidelis Andria as a winger.

== Club career ==
After playing youth football with Udinese, Lugo moved to Colón de Santa Fe in the 2010 summer. After 1 1/2 seasons in Argentina, he returned to his homeland, joining Independiente de Campo Grande.

After one season with the side Lugo moved to fellow second-divisioner Sportivo Carapeguá. He was an important midfield unit during his six-month spell, netting three goals in 23 appearances.

On 7 September 2013 Lugo moved to Italian Serie B side Bari. A day later he made his division debut, starting in a 2–3 loss at Siena.

On 18 December 2018 he was released from his Virtus Francavilla contract by mutual consent. In 2019, he returned home to Paraguay and played for Club Nacional. However, in December 2019, Lugo moved to Italy again and signed with Serie D club Fidelis Andria.
