= Aldo Cubilla =

American soccer player (born 2001)

Personal information
- Full name: Aldo Sebastián Cubilla Bogado
- Date of birth: January 8, 2001 (age 25)
- Place of birth: United States
- Height: 5 ft 10 in (1.78 m)
- Position: Left midfielder

Youth career
- 2008–202?: Sol de América

Senior career*
Years	Team	Apps	(Gls)
2019–2023	Sol de América	9	(0)
- * Club domestic league appearances and goals as of 19:10, 24 September 2023 (UTC)

Aldo Sebastián Cubilla Bogado (born January 8, 2001) is an American soccer player who plays as a left midfielder.

== Career ==
=== Club career ===
Born in the United States, however of Paraguayan origin, Cubilla is a product of Sol de América which he joined in 2008. On 14 July 2019, Cubilla got his official debut for Sol de América in the Paraguayan Primera División against Club Nacional, where he was in the starting lineup. Cubilla was also in the starting lineup in the following five matches in a row. He made a total of 7 appearances for the team in the 2019 season. In the 2020 season, Cubilla played no games for the first team and was only on the bench for one game.
