= Feliciano Brizuela =

Paraguayan footballer (born 1996)

Personal information
- Full name: Feliciano Brizuela Baez
- Date of birth: 17 July 1996 (age 30)
- Place of birth: Colonia Independencia, Paraguay
- Height: 1.80 m (5 ft 11 in)
- Position: Right winger

Youth career
- 3 de Febrero

Senior career*
Years	Team	Apps	(Gls)
2018–2019	3 de Febrero	41	(6)
2019	→ Avaí (loan)	14	(3)
2020–2024	Olimpia	9	(0)
2020	→ San Lorenzo (loan)	24	(1)
2021	→ Guaireña (loan)	25	(2)
2022	→ Guaireña (loan)	16	(1)
2023	→ Nacional (loan)	31	(4)
2024	Tacuary	18	(0)
2025	ABC	3	(0)
- * Club domestic league appearances and goals as of 17:02, 25 December 2024 (UTC)

Feliciano Brizuela Baez (born 17 July 1996) is a Paraguayan professional footballer who plays as a right winger.

== Club career ==
=== 3 de Febrero ===
Throughout the 2018 season, Brizuela played 41 of 44 matches and went on to score six goals for 3 de Febrero.

On 8 February 2019 it was confirmed, that he had been loaned out to Brazilian Campeonato Brasileiro Série A club Avaí FC for the 2019 season. Brizuela helped Avaí winning the Campeonato Catarinense, playing 10 games, 6 from start and 4 as a substitute, and also scored two goals. He also played four games in the Campeonato Brasileiro Série A and one game in the Copa do Brasil. Brizuela returned to 3 de Febrero in November 2019.

=== Olimpia ===
In January 2020, Brizuela signed for Club Olimpia and was immediately loaned out to Club Sportivo San Lorenzo. He got his debut for San Lorenzo on 17 January 2020 against Club Guaraní. Brizuela made 24 appearances for the club and scored one goal, before returning to Olimpia.

In January 2021, he was loaned out again, this time to Guaireña F.C. for the 2021 season. After a season with three goals in 27 games, Brizuela returned to Olimpia in January 2022.

After returning to Olimpia for the 2022 season, he got his official debut for the club on 5 February 2022 against General Caballero JLM. However, in July 2022, Brizuela was sent out on a new loan spell; the attacker returned to Guaireña on a loan for the rest of the year.

After spending the 2023 season on loan at Club Nacional, where he scored 5 goals and 5 assists in 35 games, Brizuela returned to Olimpia, where the plan was for him to spend the upcoming season. Brizuela was already in Olimpia's starting lineup in the first match of 2024, which was played against Sol de América.

=== Tacuary ===
In July 2024, Brizuela moved to Tacuary on a permanent transfer.

=== ABC FC ===
In January 2025, Brizuela returned til Brazil, after signing with ABC Futebol Clube. In May 2025, Brizuela's contract was terminated.
