= Blas Irala =

Paraguayan footballer (born 1983)

Personal information
- Full name: Blas Bernardo Irala Rojas
- Date of birth: 30 November 1983 (age 42)
- Place of birth: Piribebuy, Paraguay
- Height: 1.75 m (5 ft 9 in)
- Position: Midfielder

Senior career*
Years	Team	Apps	(Gls)
2004	Sport Colombia	6	(0)
2004	12 de Octubre	2	(0)
2006–2007	Olimpia Asunción	15	(0)
2008	Silvio Pettirossi	15	(0)
2008	Sol de América	20	(0)
2009	2 de Mayo	38	(2)
2010–2012	Nacional Asunción	58	(1)
2013	Deportivo Capiatá	31	(2)
2014	Crucero del Norte	7	(0)
2014	Deportivo Capiatá	13	(1)
2015	Cafetaleros de Chiapas	2	(0)
2015	San Lorenzo	13	(0)
2016–2017	Deportivo Capiatá	27	(0)
2017	Sportivo Trinidense	16	(0)
- * Club domestic league appearances and goals

Blas Bernardo Irala Rojas (born 30 November 1983) is a Paraguayan former professional footballer who played as a midfielder in Argentina, Mexico and Paraguay.

== Titles ==
- (Paraguay) Nacional 2011 (Torneo Apertura Paraguayan Primera División Championship)
